= List of drag groups =

This is a list of drag groups, which are groups of drag performers. A drag performer is a person who dresses in clothes associated with the sex or gender they do not identify with for special occasions to perform and entertain or engage in social activism. Many, but not all, drag performers are members of the LGBTQ+ community.

== Performers ==
Name	Members	Country	Period	Type	Notes
4Tune	4 (Aura Eternal, La Diamond, La Petite Noire, Nehellenia)	Italy	2022-present	Drag queens	
The AAA Girls	3 (Alaska Thunderfuck, Courtney Act, Willam)	United States	2014-present	Drag queens	
After Dark	2	Sweden	1976–2018	Drag queens	
Angels of the North	3 (Ginger Johnson, Michael Marouli, Tomara Thomas)	United Kingdom	2024- present	Drag queens	
BAB'Z	3 (Hannah Conda, Kween Kong, Spankie Jackzon)	Australia New Zealand		Drag Queens	
The B-Girlz	3	Canada		Drag queens	
Bloolips		United Kingdom			
The Boulet Brothers	2	United States		Drag queens	
Bratpack	5 (Gia Metric, Kendall Gender, Synthia Kiss)	Canada	2015-present	Drag queens	
Cissie and Ada	2	United Kingdom		Drag queens	
Divine Divas	3 (Brigiding, Precious Paula Nicole, Viñas DeLuxe)	Philippines	2022-present	Drag queens	
DWV	3 (Detox, Willam)	United States	2012-2014	Drag queens	
The Fabulous Wonder Twins	2	El Salvador		Drag queens	
Fay Slift and Fluffy Soufflé	2	Canada	2016-present	Drag queens	
Frock Destroyers	3 (Baga Chipz, Divina De Campo, Blu Hydrangea)	United Kingdom	2019-present	Drag queens	
Glitter Hole		Ireland		Drag queens	
Great Garlic Girls		Norway	1981–present	Drag queens	
GuiGi		Canada		Mixed	
Hinge and Bracket		United Kingdom			
Hot Peaches	Various	United States	1970s-1990s	Mixed	
Jinkx and Dela	2 (BenDeLaCreme, Jinkx Monsoon)	United States		Drag queens	
Kiki and Herb	2	United States		Drag queens	
The Kinsey Sicks	Various	United States	1993-present	Drag queens	
Kita and Anita	2 (Anita Wigl'it, Kita Mean)	New Zealand		Drag queens	
Lesburlesque		United Kingdom		Drag kings	
Queentastic		Norway	2005-present	Drag queens	
REYN4	4 (Captivating Katkat, Marina Summers, Maxie, Precious Paula Nicole)	Philippines		Drag queens	
Sestre		Slovenia	2000-present	Drag queens	
She-Dick	3	United States		Drag queens	
Sisters of Perpetual Indulgence		United States		Drag queens	
Stephanie's Child	3 (Jan Sport, Rosé, Lagoona Bloo)	United States			
Sugar and Spice	2	United States	2018-present	Drag queens	
Switch n' Play	7	United States	2006–present	Drag and burlesque	
Toxice	4	Romania		Drag queens	
Tranimal		United States			
Transkuntinental	7 (Detox, Kelly Mantle, Rhea Litré, Willam Belli)	United States	2009-2010s	Drag queens	
Trixie and Katya	2 (Katya Zamolodchikova, Trixie Mattel)	United States	2015-present	Drag queens	
United Kingdolls	4 (A'Whora, Bimini Bon-Boulash, Lawrence Chaney, Tayce)	United Kingdom		Drag queens	

== See also ==
- List of drag queens
- List of drag kings
