= Shartistry in Motion =

Studio album by Willam Belli
- Released: June 2, 2015
- Genre: Comedy
- Length: 27:42
- Label: Self-released
- Producer: Markaholic; The Prodigal for American Commission; Uncle Slamm

Willam Belli chronology
The Wreckoning (2012)	Shartistry in Motion (2015)	Now That's What I Call Drag Music, Vol .1 (2018)

Singles from Shartistry in Motion
- 1. "Only Anally" Released: June 16, 2014; 2. "American Apparel Ad Girls" Released: September 24, 2014; 3. "Es Una Pasiva" Released: January 8, 2015; 4. "Ride for AIDS" Released: May 26, 2015; 5. "Thick Thighs" Released: June 2, 2015; 6. "U.C.C." Released: September 22, 2015

Shartistry in Motion is the second studio album by American drag queen Willam Belli, released on June 2, 2015. The album was self-released by Belli but experienced a much wider release than his previous album, The Wreckoning (2012), and was made available to buy on iTunes and Amazon, and to stream on Spotify. Much alike Belli's debut album, Shartistry in Motion features a mixture of original songs and parodies. The album quickly became Belli's most successful album, debuting at number 1 on the Billboard Comedy Albums chart.

== Background and development ==
Two of the main collaborators on Shartistry in Motion, Courtney Act and Alaska Thunderfuck 5000 are both members of the drag group American Apparel Ad Girls with Belli. Detox Icunt and Vicky Vox, main collaborators on Belli's debut album The Wreckoning and ex-members of the band DWV with Willam, did not return for his sophomore album as the group disbanded in 2014. However, Rhea Litré, a drag queen in Willam's other disbanded group Tranzkuntinental and who featured on "Let's Have a KaiKai" on Belli's 2012 album, returned to feature on "U.C.C.".

Shartistry in Motion features three original songs, "Coin on the Dresser", "How Much Can't", and "Thick Thighs" with fellow RuPaul's Drag Race season 4 alumni Latrice Royale. The rest of the songs featured on the album are parodies of popular songs; "Ride for AIDS" is a parody of "Blank Space" by Taylor Swift, "American Apparel Ad Girls" is a parody of "Farrah Fawcett Hair" by Capital Cities, "U.C.C." is a parody of "Love on Top" by Beyoncé, and "Only Anally" is a version of "Unconditionally" by Katy Perry. "Es Una Pasiva" is a solo version of the DWV hit "Boy Is a Bottom", sung in Spanish.

== Promotion ==
Much of Shartistry in Motion's promotion came from Belli's YouTube channel, Twitter account, website, and the single's music videos, with some being posted up to a year before the album's release. Belli also toured in numerous places across the United States, South America, Europe, and the United Kingdom, some with the American Apparel Ad Girls and some solo.

== Singles ==
1. "Only Anally" was the first single to be released from the album on 16 June 2014. A parody of Katy Perry's 2013 single "Unconditionally", with the lyrics changed to reflect how Belli only does things anally, the track was penned by Evil Jeff, creator of Jiz, an animated webseries and dubbed parody of Jem and the Holograms. It was produced by Uncle Slamm, who also produced "Love You Like a Big Schlong" from Willam's debut album. The music video was also released on 16 June, and featured excerpts from an episode of Jiz, entitled "Jiz is Dead".
2. "American Apparel Ad Girls", featuring Courtney Act and Alaska Thunderfuck 5000, was released as the album's second single on 24 September 2014. The song parodies Capital Cities' 2014 single "Farrah Fawcett Hair", and was produced by Markaholic. Its release coincided with the trio's American Apparel merchandise release and advertising campaign, both of which are mentioned in the song. The music video was directed by Shawn Adeli and produced by Anthony Torrez. The track quickly became one of Belli's most successful songs, reaching number 10 on the Billboard Comedy chart and garnering over 2,000,000 views on YouTube. Willam, Courtney and Alaska later toured the song around the United Kingdom with the #AAAGirls Tour.
3. "Es Una Pasiva" was released on 8 January 2015. It is a solo version of Willam's former band, DWV's hit "Boy Is a Bottom", a parody of Alicia Keys' 2012 single "Girl on Fire", this time sung in Spanish. The track was produced by Markaholic, who also produced the original version of the song. "Es Una Pasiva" also features a sample of a version of "La Bamba" by Ritchie Valens, "Macarena" by Los del Río and "Bidi Bidi Bom Bom" by Selena. The music video was released on 13 January 2015 on YouTube and was produced by Anthony Torrez and Beth Wheatley.
4. "Ride for AIDS", featuring Alaska Thunderfuck 5000, was released as the album's third single on 26 May 2015. It was released to encourage listeners to donate money and participate in the annual AIDS/LifeCycle fundraiser. The song is a parody of Taylor Swift's 2014 single "Blank Space". The music video was released on 29 May 2015 and was directed by Ryan Parma.
5. "Thick Thighs", featuring Latrice Royale, was released on 2 June 2015 with the music video premiering the same day. It is the only original song released as a single from the album. Its lyrics focus on how thicker thighs are more attractive and pleasurable to men. It was produced by The Prodigal for American Commission and the music video was directed by Kain O'Keeffe.
6. "U.C.C.", featuring Rhea Litré, was released as the album's sixth single on 22 September 2015 with its accompanying music video. It features Rhea Litré who had previously worked with Belli in the drag group Tranzkuntinental and on his song "Let's Have a KaiKai" from his debut album. The song is a parody of "Love on Top" and also features a small snippet of a parody of "Jealous", both by Beyoncé. Its lyrics revolve around Willam and Rhea's love and need for uncircumcised penis, with U.C.C. standing for "uncut cock". The song's music video was directed by Kain O'Keeffe.

== Track listing ==
No.	Title	Writer(s)	Producer(s)	Length
1.	"Coin on the Dresser"	Willam Belli	The Prodigal for American Commission	3:28
2.	"Ride for AIDS" (featuring Alaska Thunderfuck 5000)	Belli; Justin Honard; Taylor Swift; Max Martin; Karl Schuster	Markaholic	3:47
3.	"Thick Thighs" (featuring Latrice Royale)	Belli	The Prodigal for American Commission	3:20
4.	"American Apparel Ad Girls" (featuring Courtney Act & Alaska Thunderfuck 5000)	Belli; Honard; Shane Jenek; Ryan Merchant; Sebu Simonian; André Benjamin	Markaholic	3:48
5.	"U.C.C." (featuring Rhea Litré)	Belli; Joshua Miller; Beyoncé Knowles; Terius Nash; Shea Taylor; Lyrica Anderson; Noel Fisher; Andre Eric Proctor; Brian Soko; Rasool Diaz; Jordy Asher	Markaholic	4:00
6.	"How Much Can't"	Belli	The Prodigal for American Commission	3:27
7.	"Es Una Pasiva"	Belli; Matthew Sanderson; L. Hara; Alicia Keys; Salaam Remi; Jeff Bhasker; Billy Squier; Denzil Foster; Thomas McElroy; James Brown; Fred Wesley; John Starks; Traditional; Ritchie Valens; Rafael Ruiz Perdigones; Antonio Romero Monge; Selena Quintanilla; Pete Astudillo	Markaholic	3:25
8.	"Only Anally"	Evil Jeff; Katheryn Hudson; Lukasz Gottwald; Martin; Henry Walter	Uncle Slamm	3:47
Total length:				27:42

Notes

- "Ride for AIDS" is a parody of "Blank Space", written by Taylor Swift, Max Martin, and Shellback and performed by Swift.
- "American Apparel Ad Girls" is a parody of "Farrah Fawcett Hair", written by Ryan Merchant, Sebu Simonian, and André Benjamin and performed by Capital Cities and André 3000.
- "U.C.C." is a parody of "Love On Top", written by Beyoncé, The-Dream, and Shea Taylor and performed by Beyoncé. It also included a small parody snippet of "Jealous", written by Beyoncé, Lyrica Anderson, Detail, Dre Moon, Brian Soko, Rasool Diaz, and Boots and performed by Beyoncé.
- "Es Una Pasiva" is a Spanish-language cover of Willam's DWV song "Boy Is a Bottom", written by Belli, Detox, and Vicky Vox. The song is a parody of "Girl on Fire", written by Alicia Keys, Salaam Remi, Jeff Bhasker, and Billy Squier and performed by Keys. It also contains a parody snippet of "My Lovin' (You're Never Gonna Get It)", written by Foster & McElroy, James Brown, Fred Wesley, and John Starks and performed by En Vogue. This version samples "La Bamba" performed by Ritchie Valens, "Macarena", written by Rafael Ruiz Perdigones and Antonio Romero Monge and performed by Los del Rio, and "Bidi Bidi Bom Bom", written by Selena and Pete Astudillo and performed by Selena.
- "Only Anally" is a parody of "Unconditionally", written by Katy Perry, Dr. Luke, Max Martin, and Cirkut and performed by Perry.

== Charts ==
Chart (2015)	Peak position
US Billboard Comedy Albums	1
