= Now That's What I Call Drag Music, Vol. 1 =

2018 studio album by Willam Belli

Studio album by Willam Belli
- Released: October 26, 2018
- Genre: Comedy
- Length: 32:35
- Label: Self-released

Willam Belli chronology
Shartistry in Motion (2015)	Now That's What I Call Drag Music, Vol. 1 (2018)

Now That's What I Call Drag Music, Vol. 1, also known as Songs in the Key of Nope, is a comedy album by American drag performer Willam Belli, self-released on October 26, 2018. The album features fellow RuPaul's Drag Race contestants Latrice Royale and Trixie Mattel, as well as drag performer Rhea Litré. Former contestants Derrick Barry and Courtney Act make guest appearances in the music video for the song "Derrick". In the United States, the album spent two weeks on Billboard's Comedy Albums chart, reaching a peak position of number four.

== Background ==
Willam Belli, mononymously known as Willam, is an actor, drag performer, and recording artist who came to prominence for competing in the fourth season of RuPaul's Drag Race in 2012. Now That's What I Call Drag Music is Belli's third studio album, following his debut The Wreckoning (2012) and Shartistry in Motion (2015). Belli wanted to create a studio album similar to his previous songs "Love You Like a Big Schlong" from The Wreckoning and "Boy Is a Bottom" (2013), which parody Selena Gomez & the Scene's "Love You like a Love Song" (2011) and Alicia Keys' "Girl on Fire" (2012), respectively, after drag queens on a gay cruise told him those were their "moneymaker songs" to perform.

== Composition ==
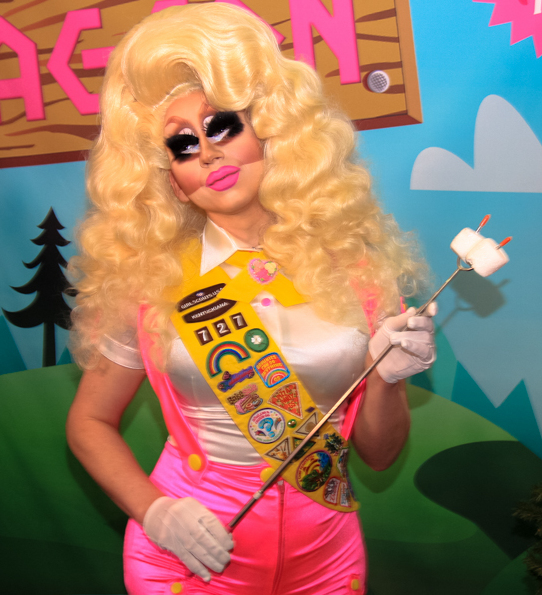
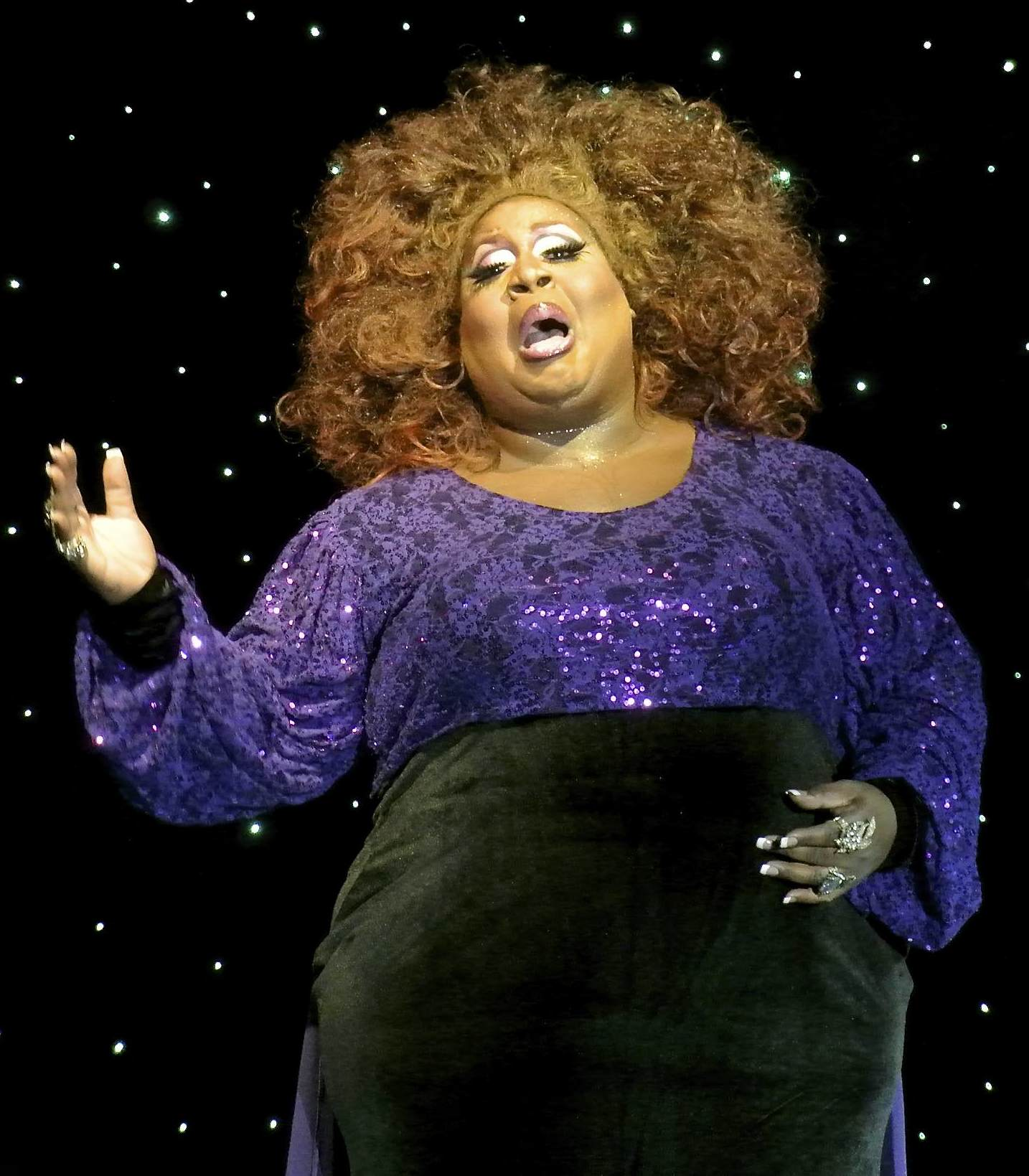
Fellow RuPaul's Drag Race contestants Trixie Mattel (left) and Latrice Royale (right) are featured on the tracks "Aileen" and "Oral", respectively.

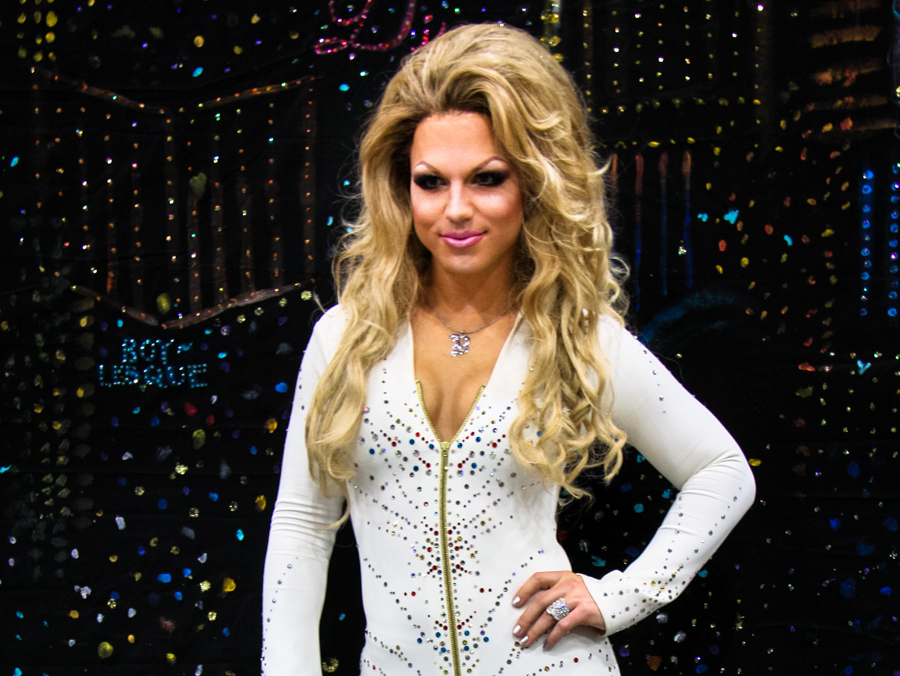
Fellow RuPaul's Drag Race contestant and Britney Spears impersonator Derrick Barry is the subject of "Derrick" and appears in the song's music video with his partners.

The self-released comedy album is approximately 32.5 minutes long and has nine tracks, including seven parody songs and two originals. The album spans multiple genres; according to Belli, "there's a poop song on there, there's a blow job song, there's a dance song, there's a country song, there's a jazzy song, there's an EDM song".

Belli has said the opening track "Hoops" is his favorite because "it involves my sex life and jewelry, two of my favorite things". The song "Aileen" is a parody of Dolly Parton's "Jolene" about American serial killer and prostitute Aileen Wuornos, co-written by Jackie Beat and featuring fellow Drag Race contestant Trixie Mattel. In a 2018 Billboard interview, Belli said he has "always been kind of obsessed" with Wuornos because of her similarities to one of his aunts who was also a sex worker. Furthermore, he said, "I've done all the things that she's done, except kill people. I've hooked. I've bleached my hair. I've walked down I-95. Done all of it." In 2019, he said Wournos' "upbringing of abuse and neglect seriously handicapped her chances of ending up a productive member of society without a serious redirect somewhere. She was obviously held responsible for her actions by the court, but I'm hoping the people that turned her into the troubled individual she was also reap some sort of karmic punishment, if Aileen's bullets already didn't seal that deal."

Latrice Royale, another Drag Race competitor, is featured on "Oral". "Unshart My Fart" is a parody of Toni Braxton's "Un-Break My Heart" (1996). Belli has said she is "proudest" of one of the song's rhymes. Drag queen Rhea Litré is featured on "Fries", a song about french fries. "Derrick" is about fellow Drag Race contestant and Britney Spears impersonator Derrick Barry. The song is a parody of Spears' "...Baby One More Time" (1998), with a medley covering "Stronger" (2000) and "Toxic" (2003). The song's lyrics reference an interview in which Barry incorrectly said people died in the Stonewall riots, a series of demonstrations by members of New York City's LGBT community at the Stonewall Inn in 1969, before being corrected by Belli.

== Release ==
The album was originally called Now That's What I Call Drag Music, Vol. 1 and re-issued as Songs in the Key of Nope to avoid copyright infringement with the compilation album series Now That's What I Call Music!. On November 23, 2018, Belli wrote:

Hey my album got removed from shelves due to a similarity in names from the NOW THAT'S WHAT I CALL MUSIC people. They thought "Now That's What I Call Drag Music vol. 1.0" was a violation of their copyright and since I don't have the money or time to fight it, I'm changing the album name to Songs in the key of Nope and rereleasing it. If you bought it on iTunes or Spotify, it'll be available again once the processing is done.

== Promotion ==
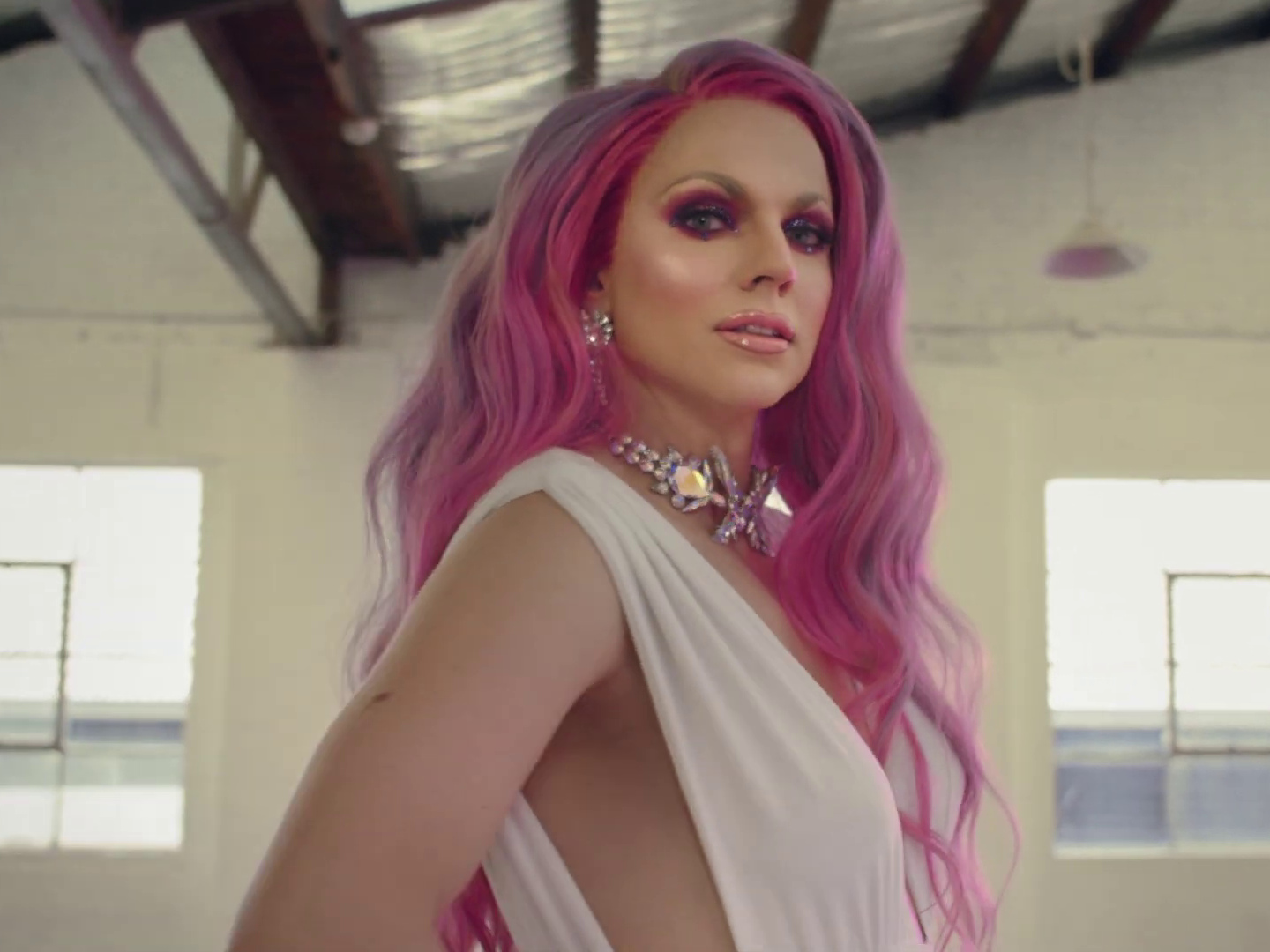
Former RuPaul's Drag Race contestant Courtney Act appears in the music video for "Derrick".

The music video for "Hoops" features nude men, some of whom have erections. Belli also released a video for "Aileen", which features Trixie Mattel out of drag. The music video for "Daddy D" was released in November 2018 and features a "bevy of smoking hot daddies", according to Instinct's Ryan Shea. The video features gay pornographic film actors Angel Rivera, Drew Sebastian, and Trelino. Uncensored and safe for work versions were released on Patreon and YouTube, respectively. Belli's music video for "Derrick", released in June 2020, features appearances by Barry and his partners Nebraska Thunderfuck and Nick San Pedro, as well as Drag Race contestant Courtney Act. In the video, Belli says "stop!... doing impressions, girl", referring to Barry's talent show performance on the premiere episode of the fifth season of RuPaul's Drag Race All Stars. Pride.com's Daniel Reynolds described the video as "both a burn and a celebration of Barry", and noted Belli's YouTube caption assuring viewers most scenes were filmed prior to stay-at-home orders implemented as a result of the COVID-19 pandemic. Belli also encouraged people to donate to the Black Lives Matter movement instead of purchasing the song.

== Track listing ==
Track listing adapted from the Apple Store, Spotify, and Tidal

No.	Title	Writer(s)	Length
1.	"Hoops"	Willam Belli	3:29
2.	"Aileen" (featuring Trixie Mattel)	Belli; Kent Fuher; Dolly Parton	2:41
3.	"Oral" (featuring Latrice Royale)	Belli; Ella Yelich-O'Connor; Joel Little	3:36
4.	"Daddy D"	Belli	3:28
5.	"Unshart My Fart"	Belli; Diane Warren	4:06
6.	"Fries" (featuring Rhea Litré)	Belli; Ester Dean; Lukasz Gottwald; Calvin Harris; Henry Walter; Geoff Mack	4:04
7.	"Derrick"	Belli; Max Martin; Rami Yacoub; Cathy Dennis; Christian Karlsson; Pontus Winnberg; Henrik Jonback	2:53
8.	"Drugs"	Belli; Ali Payami; Ali Tamposi; Andrew Watt	4:06
9.	"Unshart My Fart" (Ballad)	Belli; Warren	4:07
Total length:			32:35

Notes

- "Aileen" is a parody of "Jolene", written and performed by Dolly Parton.
- "Oral" is a parody of "Royals", written by Ella Yelich-O'Connor and Joel Little and performed by Lorde.
- "Unshart My Fart" is a parody of "Un-Break My Heart" written by Diane Warren and performed by Toni Braxton.
- "Fries" is a parody of "Where Have You Been" written by Ester Dean, Dr. Luke, Calvin Harris, Cirkut, and Geoff Mack and performed by Rihanna.
- "Derrick" is a parody of "...Baby One More Time", written by Max Martin and performed by Britney Spears. It also contains parody snippets of "Stronger", written by Martin and Rami Yacoub, and "Toxic" written by Cathy Dennis, Christian Karlsson, Pontus Winnberg, and Henrik Jonback, both performed by Spears.
- "Drugs" is a parody of "For You", written by Ali Payami, Ali Tamposi, and Andrew Wotman and performed by Liam Payne and Rita Ora.

== Charts ==
Chart (2018)	Peak position
US Billboard Comedy Albums	4

== See also ==
- Trixie Mattel discography
