= Defying Gravity =

Defying Gravity may refer to:

== Film and television ==
- Defying Gravity (1997 film)
- Defying Gravity (2008 film)
- Defying Gravity (TV series), a 2009 drama television series
- Defying Gravity: The Untold Story of Women's Gymnastics, a 2020 documentary television series released on Youtube Premium
- Defying Gravity: The Curtain Rises on Wicked, a 2024 television documentary about the film Wicked

== Music ==
- "Defying Gravity" (song), a song from the Broadway musical Wicked and the first of its two-part film adaptation
- Defying Gravity (Keith Urban album), 2009
- Defying Gravity (Mr. Big album), 2017
- Defying Gravity (The Sherbs album), 1981
- Defying Gravity (Vinnie Moore album), 2001
- Defying Gravity, an album by John Elefante, 1999
- "Defying Gravity", 1976 Jesse Winchester song covered by
  - Emmylou Harris on the 1978 album Quarter Moon in a Ten Cent Town
  - Jimmy Buffett on the 1976 album Havana Daydreamin'
  - Waylon Jennings on the 1987 album Hangin' Tough
