= Chow Down =

Single by Willam Belli

"Chow Down (at Chick-fil-A)"

Single by Willam Belli featuring Detox and Vicky Vox

from the album The Wreckoning
- Released: March 18, 2012
- Songwriters: Willam Belli, Detox, Vicky Vox
- Producer: Markaholic

Willam Belli singles chronology
"Trouble" (2012)	"Chow Down (at Chick-fil-A)" (2012)	"The Vagina Song" (2012)

Detox singles chronology
"Chow Down (at Chick-fil-A)" (2012)	"Boy Is a Bottom" (2013)

Music video
- "Chow Down" on YouTube

"Chow Down (at Chick-fil-A)" is a song by American singer and drag queen Willam Belli, featuring Detox and Vicky Vox—known collectively as DWV (Detox-Willam-Vicky), a take on the American R&B trio SWV (Sisters with Voices). The song was released on March 18, 2012, following Willam's sudden elimination midway through the fourth season of RuPaul's Drag Race. Upon its release, the song's music video went viral online.

== Background and composition ==
"The message is this: If Jeffrey Dahmer wanted to endorse a slap-chop, it would be bad. No one would want his endorsement. Drag queens are not the target endorsement market for a chicken eatery."

— Willam Belli talking about "Chow Down" to The Advocate

"Chow Down (at Chick-fil-A)" was written by Willam Belli, Detox, and Vicky Vox as a parody and social-commentary version of "Hold On" by Wilson Phillips. The song was produced by Markaholic. The bridge section features rapping by Detox, inspired by—and in tribute to—Lisa Left-Eye Lopes of TLC and her verses in their 1995 hit "Waterfalls". The song was released as the second single from Willam's first studio album The Wreckoning. "Chow Down" addresses the 2012 Chick-fil-A same-sex marriage controversy and the opening of a Chick-fil-A restaurant in Hollywood.

== Reception ==
Within three days of its release, the YouTube page for the music video had been viewed over 400,000 times. The music video would eventually gain over 9 million views on Willam's YouTube channel.

Hugh Merwin, writing for New York's Grub Street commented, "It's amazing how oddly and efficiently the drag queen trio in this video approach the notoriously anti-gay, foundational agenda of the Georgia-based fried chicken franchise Chick-fil-A in this video."

== Music video ==
The music video for "Chow Down (at Chick-fil-A)" was directed by Michael Serrato. Serrato is a writer for the Neil's Puppet Dreams, in which Willam has appeared. RuPaul's Drag Race pit crew member Jason Carter appears in the music video. In the music video, Willam dresses as Wilson Phillips member Chynna Phillips, Detox dresses as Wendy Wilson, while Vicky Vox appears as Carnie Wilson. The music video's rap scene was filmed at the Electric Fountain in Beverly Hills.

Upon release, the music video went viral online.

== Charts ==
Chart (2012)	Peak position
US Comedy Digital Songs (Billboard)	12
