= The AAA Girls =

American drag queen music and comedy trio

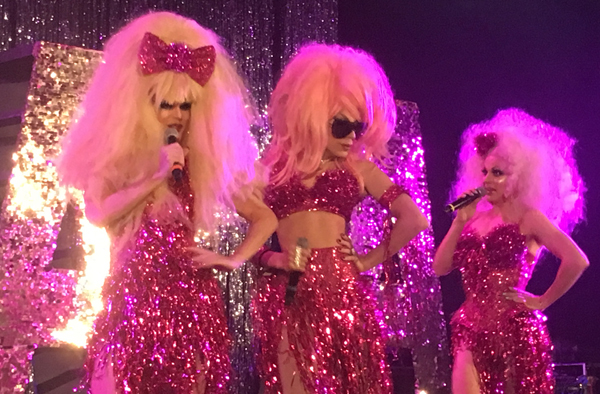
- The AAA Girls in 2017. From left: Belli, 5000, and Act

Background information
- Also known as: The American Apparel Ad Girls
- Genres: Comedy; pop
- Years active: 2014–present
- Members: Alaska Thunderfuck 5000; Courtney Act; Willam Belli

The AAA Girls (The American Apparel Ad Girls) are a drag queen trio composed of the drag queens Alaska Thunderfuck 5000, Courtney Act, and Willam Belli. The trio is both a musical ensemble and a comedy troupe.

== History ==
In September 2014 the fashion brand American Apparel recruited RuPaul's Drag Race contestants Alaska, Courtney Act, and Willam to be the faces of their new ad campaign. They were the first drag queens to be ad girls for the brand. To promote the new partnership, they released their debut single, "American Apparel Ad Girls", a parody of "Farrah Fawcett Hair" by Capital Cities. The song charted at number 10 on the Billboard Comedy Digital songs chart and was later included on Willam's 2015 studio album Shartistry in Motion.

Later in 2014 they released a Christmas single, "Dear Santa, Bring Me a Man". In 2015 the group reunited for a track called "The Shade of It All" which was included on Alaska Thunderfuck's album Anus. They also recorded a song for the first Christmas Queens album. In 2017 they released their debut extended play Access All Areas. To promote the EP they embarked on the Access All Areas Tour. They have not released any music since then, with Alaska simply citing the reason to be Courtney's busy schedule in 2019.

== Discography ==
=== Extended plays ===
Title	Details	Peak chart positions		
Title	Details	US Heat	US Indie	US Comedy
Access All Areas	Released: July 7, 2017; Label: The AAA Girls; Format: Digital download	12	44	2

=== Singles ===
Title	Year	Peak chart positions	Album
Title	Year	US Comedy Digital	Album
"American Apparel Ad Girls" (Willam featuring Courtney Act and Alaska Thunderfuck)	2014	10	Shartistry in Motion
"Dear Santa, Bring Me a Man"	2014	—	Non-album single
"AAA"	2017	2	Access All Areas

=== Other appearances ===
Title	Year	Album
"The Shade of It All" (Alaska Thunderfuck featuring Courtney Act and Willam)	2015	Anus
"Christmas Sweater" (Alaska Thunderfuck, Courtney Act and Willam)	2015	Christmas Queens
"Power" (Little Mix's music video)	2017	Glory Days

== See also ==
- DWV (group)
- Girl groups in the Drag Race franchise
- List of drag groups
