= Drake Jensen =

Canadian musician

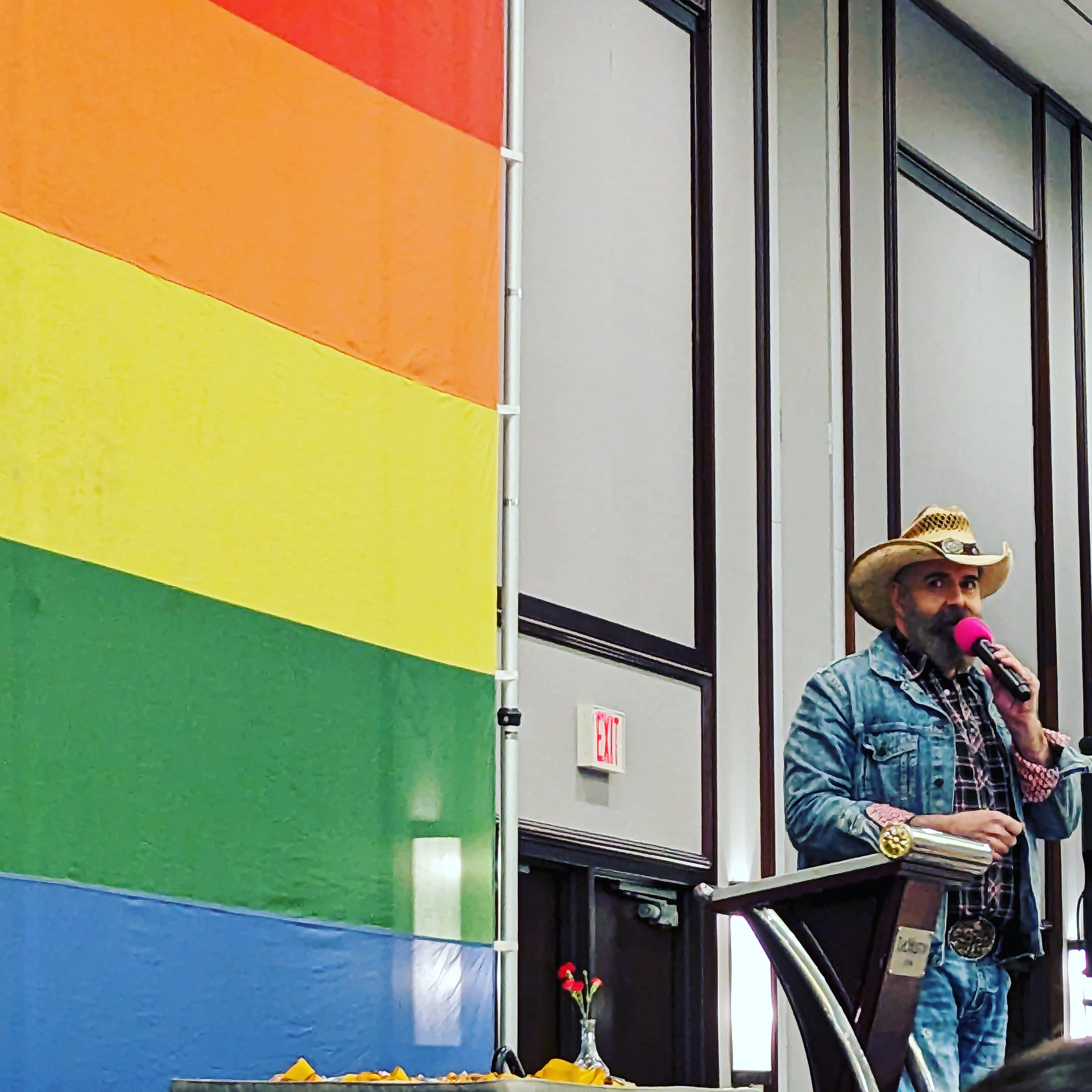
- Drake Jensen in 2023

Background information
- Born: April 15, 1970 (age 55); Glace Bay, Nova Scotia, Canada
- Origin: Glace Bay, Nova Scotia, Canada
- Genres: Country
- Occupation: Singer-songwriter
- Instrument(s): Vocals, synthesizer
- Years active: 2001–present
- Labels: Soaring Eagle Productions
- Website: http://drakejensen.ca

Drake Jensen (born April 15, 1970) is a Canadian country music artist.

== Biography ==
=== Early life ===
Drake Jensen was born in Glace Bay, Nova Scotia, on Cape Breton Island in Canada. At age four, influenced by his mother's love of country music, Jensen connected to John Denver through "Country Roads". Other influences included Merle Haggard, George Strait, John Conlee, Ronnie Milsap and Charlie Pride. He was bullied as a child and left Grade 8 because of it.

=== Career ===
Jensen's first recording was a 2001 cover of Anne Murray's "A Little Good News", which received airplay throughout the Maritimes and was a favorite of CBC Radio One.

After a lengthy hiatus, he revived his dream of becoming a vocal artist. His 2011 debut album On My Way to Finding You was recorded in Nashville with veteran independent producer Kim Copeland. The first single "Wash Me Away" has logged airplay on 100 radio stations worldwide and the album received a positive review from influential country critic Robert K. Oermann in MusicRow Magazine.

In fall 2011, he released his version of Roger Miller's "Little Toy Trains", originally titled "Old Toy Trains" and written in 1967. The song was released on a limited-edition pressing and made available for digital download. The proceeds of sales were donated to Make-A-Wish Canada.

His Ottawa debut took place at the National Arts Centre in December 2011, with opening artist Tia McGraff from Port Dover, Ontario.

On January 16, 2012, he publicly announced that he is gay and told his story of severe childhood abuse and bullying. He dedicated the video of his single, the title track to his album "On My Way to Finding You", to the memory of Ottawa teenager Jamie Hubley, who committed suicide after having been severely bullied.

In April 2012, Jensen released "Scars", written by Toronto singer-songwriter Don Graham and co-writer Zita DaSilva, and is donating the proceeds of digital download sales of this song to Bullying.org. Due to popular demand, the song was included in Jensen's second album, OUTlaw.

In November 2012, he released a video in which he performed a cover of Tammy Wynette's hit song "Stand By Your Man" featuring drag queen Willam Belli from Season 4 of RuPaul's Drag Race. The song was released as the seventh single from Willam's album The Wreckoning.

Also in November 2012, he released his first Christmas album Christmas at Home, featuring the song of the same name by fellow Cape Breton singer-songwriter Rita MacNeil, as well as "Home Again" by Duncan Wells, also of Cape Breton. The latter song was made popular by Cookie Rankin of The Rankin Family.

In December 2012, blogger Andy Towle chose Jensen as one of the top 50 most influential comings out of 2012.

The first single, "When It Hurts Like That" by Matt Ullman and Kyle Morrison Marion, from his second studio album OUTlaw was released via video on YouTube on January 30, 2013. The video was filmed in Winston-Salem, North Carolina by Blake Faucette and Justin Reich. Within four weeks of release, the video received over 100,000 views, and the single was named TRAX HEADSTARTER single of the week, having received the most spins that week at Canadian radio.

Jensen was one of the headliners at Waterloo Region's tri-Pride music festival on June 1, 2013.

On June 13, 2013, Jensen released the video for "Scars" during his performance at Nashville Pride's Pride Rocks! pre-party at the Hard Rock Cafe in Nashville, where songwriters Zita DaSilva and Don Graham saw it for the first time.

In December 2013, Jensen continued the collaboration with Canadian songwriters Graham and DaSilva by releasing the original Christmas single "Live Every Day (Like It Was Christmas Day)" along with a video produced by Jonathan Edwards of Corvidae Music. Jensen also released a cover of Gene Autry's "Here Comes Santa Claus", and is donating the proceeds to Santa Canada, an organization co-founded by friend Larry O. Lantz to bring Santa and the Christmas spirit to terminally ill children, at any time of the year.

2014 saw the recording of Luba's "Everytime I See Your Picture". Ms Kowalchyk gave her blessing to the cover version and accompanying video, and called Jensen "a maverick in the music industry". This song would become the lead single of Jensen's third studio album, Retro, released in 2015. This album was a tribute to Jensen's musical influences, including Billy Idol, George Strait, Reba McEntire, Dan Seals among others.

In 2016, Jensen recorded "Wherever Love Takes Us", with a video filmed at Ottawa's Capital Pride. The song was promoted to Australian radio, and charted in the Top 40 there. The song gained even more popularity with the creation of the line dance "Waves of Love" by renowned Irish choreographer Gary O'Reilly. The dance is being taught and by line dance groups worldwide. The song was also included as a bonus track in the limited CD-only re-release of RETRO.

Jensen teamed up with Vancouver's Patrick Masse in 2017 to record the duet "Go Your Own Way". Jensen was also included with his husband in the book "David Bowie Made Me Gay: 100 years of LGBT Music" by UK author Darryl W. Bullock. He attended the book's launch at the British Library in London on September 8, 2017, hosted by the BBC's Simon Fanshawe. Jensen gave musical performances and participated in a discussion panel along with the author and Princess Julia. In October of that year, Jensen and his producer/guitarist Jonathan Edwards were invited to perform on Via Rail's "The Canadian" train from Toronto to Vancouver and back.

Jensen's fourth studio album, "Sideshow" was released in 2018. This album is a collection of his greatest hits, along with previously released tracks "Wherever Love Takes Us" and "Go Your Own Way", as well as newly recorded songs "Talk Me Down" and a cover of Lennie Gallant's "Which Way Does The River Run".

"Talk Me Down" was released at select radio stations in 2019, and videos for it and "Which Way Does The River Run" were released to YouTube later that year.

=== Personal life ===
In 2007, Jensen moved to Ottawa and in 2008, married partner Michael Morin, who is also his personal manager.

== Band ==
His band, The OUTlaws, is currently composed of:

- Dan Aubé / John Walker – drums
- Bill Buckley – electric guitar
- Doug Chase – keyboards
- Ellen Daly – fiddle
- Jonathan Edwards – Band Leader, bass, acoustic guitar, electric guitar, harmony vocals
- Tom Nagy / Stefan Ferraro – bass
- R.W. Haller – acoustic guitar, banjo, mandolin

== Awards ==
- May 2012 – Montreal's Fondation Émergence awarded Jensen with their annual Coup de Chapeau (Hats Off) Award in recognition of his contribution to the fight against homophobia.
- Jan 2022 – Faces Magazine awarded 'Country Artist of the Year' for the 2022 Ottawa Awards to Drake Jensen

== Discography ==
=== Studio albums ===
Title	Album details	Peak chart positions	
Title	Album details	US Country	US
On My Way to Finding You	Release date: May 1, 2011; First single released: Wash Me Away, May 1, 2011; Label: Soaring Eagle Productions; Formats: CD, music download	—	—
Christmas at Home	Release date: November 2012; First single released: Christmas At Home, October 22, 2012; Label: Soaring Eagle Productions; Formats: CD, music download	—	—
OUTlaw	Release date: March 12, 2013; First single released: When It Hurts Like That, February 12, 2013; Label: Soaring Eagle Productions; Formats: CD, music download	—	—
RETRO	Release date: April 15, 2015; First single released: Everytime I See Your Picture, July 27, 2014; Label: Soaring Eagle Productions; Formats: CD, music download	—	—
Sideshow	Release date: May 1, 2018; First Single released: Talk Me Down; Label: Soaring Eagle Productions; Formats: CD		
ICONIC	Release date: Projected 2024; Label: Soaring Eagle Productions; Formats: Limited Edition Vinyl LP, music download		

=== Singles ===
Year	Single	Peak positions		Album
Year	Single	Eur	Aus	Album
2001	"A Little Good News"	—	—	—
2011	"Wash Me Away"	16	—	On My Way to Finding You
2011	"All You Need"	—	—	On My Way to Finding You
2011	"Little Toy Trains"	—	—	—
2012	"On My Way to Finding You"	—	—	On My Way to Finding You
2012	"Scars"	—	—	OUTlaw
2012	"Still on the Radio"	—	—	On My Way to Finding You
2012	"Christmas At Home"	—	—	Christmas at Home
2013	"When It Hurts Like That"	—	—	OUTlaw
2013	"Live Every Day (Like It Was Christmas day)"	—	—	—
2014	"Everytime I See Your Picture"	—	—	RETRO
2016	"Wherever Love Takes Us"	—	36	RETRO/Sideshow
2017	"Go Your Own Way" (with Patrick Masse)	—	—	Sideshow
2018	"Talk Me Down"	—	—	Sideshow
2020	"Burn the Floor"	—	—	—
2020	"Never Surrender"	—	—	ICONIC
2021	"Pieces of You"	—	—	ICONIC
2022	"Sundown"	—	—	ICONIC
2023	"Hallelujah"	—	—	ICONIC
2023	"Christmas in My Heart"	—	—	
2024	"Lovers in a Dangerous Time"	—	—	ICONIC

=== Music videos ===
Year	Video	Director	Editor
2011	"All You Need"	Blake Faucette	Justin Reich
2012	"On My Way to Finding You"	Jacob P. Fergus	Jacob P. Fergus
2012	"Stand By Your Man" (feat. Willam Belli)	Michael Serrato	Chris Vanderwall
2013	"When It Hurts Like That"	Blake Faucette	Justin Reich
2013	"Scars"	Blake Faucette	Justin Reich
2013	"Fast Enough For Me"	Blake Faucette	Justin Reich
2013	"Live Every Day (Like It Was Christmas Day)"	Jonathan Edwards	Jonathan Edwards
2014	"Everytime I See Your Picture"	Jonathan Edwards	Karen Roberts
2014	"Beautiful Colours"	Jonathan Edwards	
2016	"Wherever Love Takes Us"	Jacob Fergus	Jacob Fergus
2017	"Go Your Own Way"	Jonathan Edwards	Jonathan Edwards
2018	"Talk Me Down"	Jonathan Edwards	Justin Reich
2019	"Which Way Does The River Run"	Jonathan Edwards	Jonathan Edwards
2020	"Burn the Floor"	Thierry Papineau	
2020	"Never Surrender" (Feat. Lisa Thompson)	Drake Jensen and Nicolas Chevallier	
2021	"Pieces Of You"	Joe Lyko	
2023	"Christmas in My Heart"	Drake Jensen & Dan Groulx	Dan Groulx
2023	"Hallelujah"	Drake Jensen	Jonathan Edwards
2024	"Lovers in a Dangerous Time"	Bobby Nelson	Bobby Nelson
