= Access All Areas (EP) =

EP by The AAA Girls
- Released: July 7, 2017
- Length: 26:23
- Label: Self-released

Access All Areas is the debut extended play (EP) by The AAA Girls, self-released on July 7, 2017.

== Composition ==
"A Lacefront Like This" is a parody of "A Moment Like This" by Kelly Clarkson. "Heather?" is a parody of "We Belong Together" by Mariah Carey.

== Promotion ==
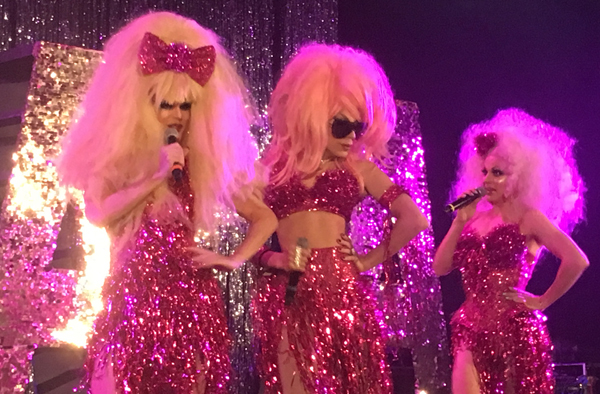
The AAA Girls performing in Denver in 2017

"AAA Girls" served as the lead single. The EP was promoted by the Access All Areas Tour.

== Track listing ==
No.	Title	Writer(s)	Length
1.	"AAA"	Willam Belli; Justin Honard; Shane Jenek	3:13
2.	"A Lacefront Like This"	Belli; Honard; Jenek; Jörgen Elofsson; John Reid	3:47
3.	"Dear Uber Driver"	Belli; Honard; Jenek	3:03
4.	"Pride or Die"	Belli; Honard; Jenek	3:02
5.	"Heather?" (featuring Stacy Layne Matthews)	Belli; Honard; Jenek; Mariah Carey; Jermaine Dupri; Manuel Seal; Johntá Austin; Kenneth Edmonds; Darnell Bristol; Bobby Womack; Patrick Moten; Sandra Sully	3:15
6.	"Tuck Tape"	Belli; Honard; Jenek	2:38
7.	"When the Water Runs Clear"	Belli; Honard; Jenek	4:01
8.	"Meet & Greet"	Belli; Honard; Jenek	3:24
Total length:			26:26

== Charts ==
Chart performance for Access All Areas
Chart (2017)	Peak position
US Independent Albums (Billboard)	44
US Top Comedy Albums (Billboard)	2
