= She-Dick =

US musical group

She-Dick Band
- She-Dick in 2007

Background information
- Origin: Dallas, Texas, United States
- Genres: Electropop; Electroclash
- Members: Miss Annie Rex; Miss Gloria Hole; Miss Candi Shell; Princess Persia
- Website: Official website

She-Dick was an American electropop band fronted by a drag trio that was formed in Dallas, Texas, in October 2006. The self-proclaimed "female detectives by day and pop-stars by night" sing adult-oriented, innuendo-filled songs about "succulent hot dogs, nasty blowjobs and butter-pecan ice cream".

== Biography ==
=== Formation ===
The band began when three gay men met at the Cedar Springs Block Party, the annual Dallas gay Halloween celebration. The founding members of She-Dick were Miss Candi Shell, Miss Gloria Hole, Miss Annie Rex and the producer, Hans HandiKraft, who began toying with gender roles and creating electropop beats with hyper-sexual, gender-bending themes. In July 2007, Rex left the band and Princess Persia joined.

After She-Dick walked the runway at the DIFFA (Design Industry Fashion For AIDS) 2007 Dallas Collection charity event that things really took off for the band. Its first live performance was at Rubber Gloves Rehearsal Studios performing with the touring bands Femme Fatality and Lazer as well as a duet with Teresa Nasty. She-Dick opened for the gay rapper Cazwell at Minc Lounge, a Dallas nightclub that hosts performances by artists such as Erykah Badu, Kaskade and DJ Tiesto.

== Film projects ==
So Beautiful is a feature-length motion picture loosely based on the chaotic and controversial activities of She-Dick at the 2007 DIFFA fashion event. Filmed and produced by Adriana, a Dallas-based independent filmmaker, it was due to be released in summer 2008; however it is awaiting release.

== See also ==
- Drag queen
- Crossdressing
- Electroclash
- List of drag groups
- List of transgender-related topics
