= Access All Areas Tour =

2017 concert tour by the AAA Girls

- Tour by The AAA Girls
- Promotional poster for the tour
- Associated album: Access All Areas
- Start date: September 20, 2017
- End date: October 14, 2017
- Legs: 1
- No. of shows: 15 in North America

The AAA Girls concert chronology
- Australian Tour (2015); Access All Areas Tour (2017)

The Access All Areas Tour (advertised as the Access All Areas: North American Tour) was the second concert tour by supergroup, The AAA Girls. The group is composed of RuPaul's Drag Race alums: Courtney Act, Willam Belli and Alaska Thunderfuck. The tour supports the group's debut EP, Access All Areas (2017). Beginning fall 2017, the tour played 15 cities in North America.

== Background ==
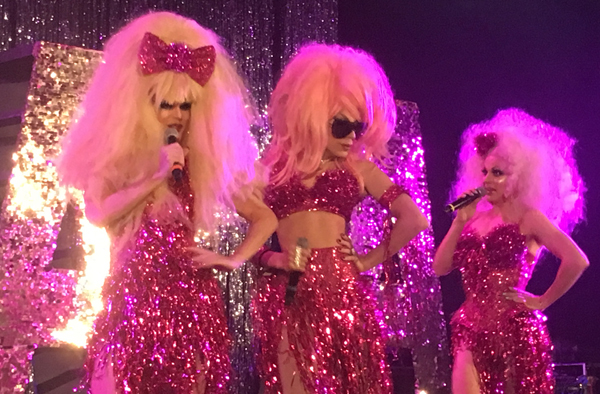
The AAA Girls performing in Denver

The tour was announced August 2017, a month after the release of their EP. Produced by Fullscreen Live, the tour played 15 cities in the United States and Canada. The show was promoted as a full production with full staging, costume changes and choreography. As a thank you, the group live called fans, on Instagram, who purchased tickets. The Squared Division served are creative directors and Jae Fusz serves as choreographer. Rehearsals began September 10, 2017 at CenterStaging in Burbank. Backstage footage is chronicled on each of the members YouTube channels: the "After Show", "Courtney Chronicles" and "Billium's Wheatdown".

Group member Courtney Act described the concert as "not a typical drag show". She states:

"We're creating a really cool concert experience that hasn't really been seen before by 'Drag Race' fans. A lot of the shows that tour with these bigger venues are the girls doing the regular numbers that they would do in a club on a theater stage. This is like, production numbers—we've got costumes and choreography. Most of the music is original, but we have some parodies that we do as well. It's more on the side of a concert than a variety show, which [fans] are normally used to. It's going to be really unique."

Proceeds from the show in Houston went towards relief for Hurricane Harvey.

== Setlist ==
The following setlist was obtained from the September 21, 2017 concert; held at Fitzgerald's in Houston, Texas. It does not represent all concerts for the duration of the tour.

AAA Girls

1. "AAA"
2. "A Lacefront Like This"
3. "Tuck Tape"

Willam

4. "Glamorous" / "The Glamorous Life"
5. "Work from Home" / "Work" / "Work Bitch" / "Work" / "She Works Hard for the Money" (contains elements of "Whistle While You Work" and "Supermodel (You Better Work)" )

AAA Girls

6. "When the Water Runs Clear"
7. "Dear Uber Driver"
8. "Pride or Die"

Courtney

9. "Chandelier" / "Diamonds" / "Titanium"

Alaska & Willam

10. "Did You Have to Use Your Finger?" / "Hole Too Open" / "Breed Me" / "Big Black Dick"

AAA Girls

11. "It's All Over"
12. "Power" / "No Scrubs" / "Jumpin', Jumpin'" / "Wannabe"

Alaska

13. "Valentina"

AAA Girls

14. "Heather?"
15. "Meet & Greet"

Encore

16. "American Apparel Ad Girls"

Notes

- "A Lacefront Like This" is a parody of "A Moment Like This"
- "Tuck Tape" is a parody of the theme song for DuckTales
- "Dear Uber Driver" is a parody of "Dear Future Husband"
- "Did You Have to Use Your Finger?" is a parody of "Linger"
- "Hole Too Open" is a parody of "Oklahoma"
- "Breed Me" is a parody of "Greedy"
- "Big Black Dick" is a parody of "Black Magic"
- "Valentina" is a parody of "Despacito"
- "Heather?" is a parody of "We Belong Together"
- "American Apparel Ad Girls" is a parody of "Farrah Fawcett Hair"

== Tour dates ==
Date	City	Country	Venue
North America
September 20, 2017	Dallas	United States	Granada Theater
September 21, 2017	Houston	United States	Fitzgerald's
September 22, 2017	Austin	United States	Empire Control Room
September 25, 2017	Orlando	United States	Venue 578
September 26, 2017	Atlanta	United States	The Loft
September 28, 2017	Falls Church	United States	State Theatre
September 30, 2017	New York City	United States	Roulette Intermedium
October 1, 2017	Boston	United States	Machine
October 3, 2017	Toronto	Canada	The Opera House
October 4, 2017	Detroit	United States	Garden Theater
October 5, 2017	Chicago	United States	Logan Square Auditorium
October 8, 2017	Denver	United States	Oriental Theater
October 10, 2017	Los Angeles	United States	Globe Theater
October 12, 2017	San Francisco	United States	City Nights
October 14, 2017	Portland	United States	Bossanova Ballroom

Cancellations and rescheduled shows

August 26, 2017	Marietta, Georgia	Strand Theatre	Moved to the Center Stage Theater in Atlanta, Georgia
