= Glitter Hole =

Irish drag collective

Glitter HOLE is self-described as a "DIY drag collective" from Ireland. They deliver prediominantly adult-themed, amateur entertainment.

They have performed at Festivals such as Dublin Fringe Festival.

They have occasionally performed "Drag Story Time" events for children, such as at Party in the Park as part of the International Literature Festival Dublin, after which they were recommended to Dún Laoghaire–Rathdown Libraries. But in April 2019, the scheduled event in Deansgrange Library and was cancelled by Dún Laoghaire–Rathdown County Council. Initially DLR claimed the event was "not age-appropriate", prompting claims of homophobia, then later claiming the event was cancelled due to "significant concern at the high level of degrading, inappropriate comments on social media about the performers and library staff." The cancellation renewed conversations about Ireland's censorship laws.

Glitter HOLE stated that their storytime events had been allowed previously and that they were age-appropriate and had received only positive feedback. Some shared pictures of previous events where one can see children sitting on a floor while adults in various character costumes read books. They stated that this is what "bigots" wanted cancelled, what they were upset about.

== See also ==
- LGBT rights in the Republic of Ireland
- List of drag groups
