= The Wreckoning (album) =

Studio album by Willam Belli
- Released: November 17, 2012
- Label: Self-released

Willam Belli chronology
The Wreckoning (2012)	Shartistry in Motion (2015)

Singles from The Wreckoning
- 1. "Trouble" Released: March 12, 2012; 2. "Chow Down" Released: March 18, 2012; 3. "The Vagina Song" Released: March 21, 2012; 4. "Love You Like a Big Schlong" Released: April 29, 2012; 5. "She Doesn't Know" Released: May 29, 2012; 6. "Let's Have a KaiKai" Released: August 2, 2012; 7. "Stand by Your Man" Released: November 10, 2012; 8. "RuPaulogize" Released: April 18, 2013; 9. "Potential New Boyfriend" Released: July 26, 2013

The Wreckoning is the debut studio album by American drag queen Willam Belli, released on November 17, 2012. The album was self-released by Belli and was available exclusively on his website.

== Background and development ==
Many of the album's collaborators had previously worked with Willam. Detox and Vicky Vox, who are featured on "Chow Down" and "Starfucker", are in the band Tranzkuntinental with Willam. Rhea Litré, who appears on "Let's Have a KaiKai" is also a member of the band. Michael Serrato, who directed several of the album's music videos, is a writer for the Neil's Puppet Dreams, in which Willam has appeared.

== Release ==
The Wreckoning was self-released through Willam Belli's website on November 17, 2012.

== Singles ==
1. The album's lead single, "Trouble", was released on March 12, 2012. The song was produced by RuPaul's Red Hot collaborator Tom Trujillo. The music video for the song was directed by porn director Chi Chi LaRue and premiered on Logo TV.
2. "Chow Down", featuring Detox and Vicky Vox was released on March 18, 2012, following Willam's elimination from the fourth season of RuPaul's Drag Race. The music video, directed by Michael Serrato, went viral. The song parodies "Hold On" originally by Wilson Phillips.
3. "The Vagina Song" was released as the album's third single on March 21, 2012. The song, written as a parody of "Billionaire" by Travie McCoy featuring Bruno Mars, was produced by Calpernia Addams and Markaholic. The music video was directed by Michael Serrato, and went viral, becoming viewed over 2.8 million times.
4. The album's fourth single, "'Love You Like a Big Schlong", was released on April 29, 2012, and was produced by Uncle Slamm. The song parodies "Love You Like a Love Song" by Selena Gomez & the Scene and was inspired after Willam lost a lip syncing contest to 7-year-old Eden Wood during a segment of the 2012 NewNowNext Awards.
5. "She Doesn't Know" was released as a digital download on May 29, 2012, without a music video.
6. On August 2, 2012, "Let's Have a KaiKai", featuring Rhea Litré was released. The song parodied "Let's Have a Kiki" by the Scissor Sisters.
7. "Stand by Your Man", featuring Drake Jensen, was released as the album's seventh single on November 10, 2012. The song is a Tammy Wynette cover.
8. On April 18, 2013, "RuPaulogize", featuring Sharon Needles, was released. The song is a parody of "Apologize" originally by OneRepublic. The music video was directed by Michael Serrato and featured appearances by Alaska Thunderfuck 5000, Dirty Sanchez's Mario Diaz, and Raja. Alaska impersonated drag performer Christeene Vale for the music video.
9. "Potential New Boyfriend" served as the ninth single, released on July 26, 2013. There is no video for the song. The song is a Dolly Parton cover.

== Track listing ==
Credits adapted from the liner notes of official physical release.

No.	Title	Writer(s)	Producer(s)	Length
1.	"Love You Like a Big Schlong"	Willam Belli; Ralphie^{[a]}; Antonina Armato; Tim James; Adam Schmalholz	Markaholic; Uncle Slamm^{[a]}	3:06
2.	"Trouble"	Belli; Tom Trujillo; Ben Bove	Tom Trujillo^{[b]}	2:30
3.	"Chow Down" (featuring Detox and Vicky Vox)	Belli; L. Hara; Matthew Sanderson; Carnie Wilson; Chynna Phillips; Glen Ballard	Markaholic; Arden Fisher^{[c]}	4:02
4.	"Starfucker" (featuring Detox and Vicky Vox)	Belli; Hara; Sanderson^{[a]}; Michael Serrato; M. Byers	Markaholic	3:28
5.	"The Vagina Song"	Belli; Travie McCoy; Peter Hernandez; Philip Lawrence; Ari Levine	Markaholic; Calpernia Addams^{[a]}	3:45
6.	"Potential New Boyfriend"	Steve Kipner^{[a]}; John Lewis Parker^{[a]}	Markaholic; Thor Stephens	3:05 3:05
7.	"She Doesn't Know"	G. Hulden; C. Hammar; C. Mason	G. Hulden; C. Hammar; C. Mason	3:03
8.	"Let's Have a KaiKai" (featuring Rhea Litré)	Belli; Joshua Miller; Mike Munich; Shane Jenek; Jason Sellards; Scott Hoffman; Ana Lynch	Markaholic	3:52
9.	"Stand by Your Man" (featuring Drake Jensen)	Tammy Wynette; Billy Sherrill	Jonathan Edwards; Corvidae Music	3:40
10.	"RuPaulogize" (featuring Sharon Needles)	Belli; Aaron Cody; Ryan Tedder	Markaholic	3:30
11.	"Trouble" (WDWD Doot Doot Mix^{[f]})	Belli; Trujillo; Bove	Tom Trujillo; F. Allen^{[g]}; Jared Jones^{[g]}	3:22
Total length:				37:23

Notes

- ^{^a} signifies person not cited on physical release
- ^{^b} signifies person cited as "Triad Entertainment" on physical release
- ^{^c} signifies keys/guitar engineer and additional producer
- ^{^d} signifies person as incorrectly cited as writer on physical release
- ^{^e} signifies percussion engineer and additional producer
- ^{^f} track stylized as "Trouble WDWD Doot Doot Mix"
- ^{^g} signifies remix engineer and additional producer
