= Willam Belli =

American actor, drag queen, and recording artist

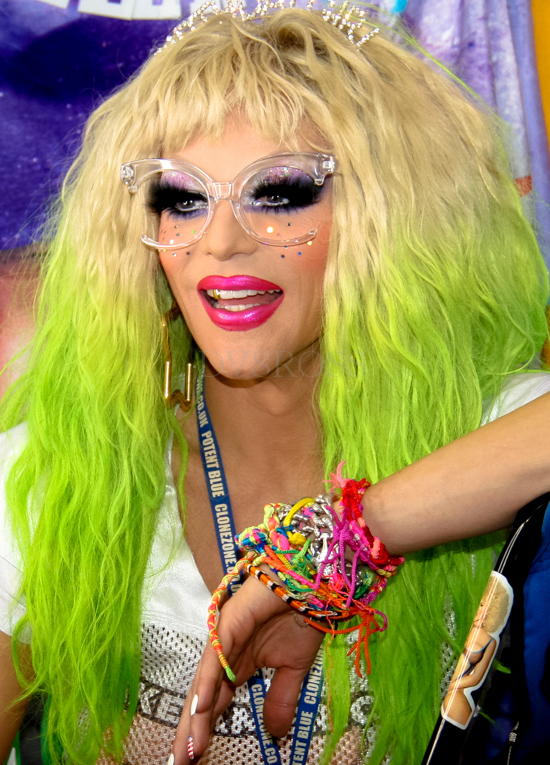
- Willam at RuPaul's DragCon LA in 2019
- Born: June 30, 1982 (age 44); Philadelphia, Pennsylvania, U.S.
- Occupations: Actor; drag queen; singer-songwriter; reality television personality; author; YouTuber
- Spouse: Bruce Bealke (m. 2008; sep. 2015)
- Musical career
- Genres: Pop; comedy
- Instrument: Vocals
- Label: Self-released
- Member of: The AAA Girls
- Formerly of: DWV

YouTube information
- Channel: willam belli
- Years active: 2002–present
- Subscribers: 929 thousand
- Views: 262.9 million
- Last updated: December 27, 2025
- Website: www.willambelli.com

Willam Belli (/ˈbɛlaɪ/, born June 30, 1982), mononymously known as Willam, is an American drag queen, actor, singer-songwriter, comedian, reality television personality, author, and YouTuber. Willam came to prominence as a contestant on the fourth season of RuPaul's Drag Race in 2012. She was the first contestant to be disqualified from the competition.

Before appearing on Drag Race, Willam worked as an actor, most notably playing the recurring role of transgender woman Cherry Peck in Ryan Murphy's medical drama Nip/Tuck. She has continued to perform in a variety of films, television series and web series, often in drag. In 2018, she appeared in the critically acclaimed film A Star Is Born. For her performance on the dark comedy web series EastSiders, she was nominated for a Daytime Emmy Award for Outstanding Supporting Actor in a Digital Daytime Drama Series.

Since 2012, Willam has recorded three albums of comedy music, mostly consisting of parodies of popular songs. Her second album, Shartistry in Motion, debuted at number one on the Billboard Comedy Albums chart. Between 2012 and 2014, she recorded several songs as part of the group DWV (alongside drag queens Vicky Vox and Detox), including the parodies "Chow Down" and "Boy Is a Bottom", whose music videos were viral successes. Following the breakup of DWV, Willam formed another drag supergroup, the AAA Girls, with Courtney Act and Alaska Thunderfuck.

== Early life ==
Willam Belli was born in Philadelphia to Debbi Ruzic Belli. Belli is from a Catholic background. His mother discovered he was gay when she caught him in an incestuous relationship with his male cousin when he was young. He is of Italian and Yugoslav heritage. He has an older sister, Samantha. He lived in Florida for middle school and high school. Belli's father worked at the Kennedy Space Center. His aunt is television director Mary Lou Belli.

Growing up, Belli frequently illustrated dresses, to which many people assumed that he wanted to become a fashion designer, but he asserted that he designed the garments with the intent to wear them himself. He later worked in costume design in theatre, and, at the age of 13, he was put in drag for the first time in Jesus Christ Superstar at a community theater. From there, he would dress in drag to watch performances of The Rocky Horror Show, and was paid for a drag performance for the first time at the age of 16.

Belli was overweight when he was young but lost the extra pounds by becoming vegetarian. At the age of 16, he was legally emancipated from his parents. Belli met his husband, Bruce, at 19. They were married on September 9, 2008. They separated in 2015.

== Career ==
=== 2000–2008: Beginnings ===
Belli's first acting credit was as the role of a street hustler named Bart Jaker on two episodes of The District (2002) and his first TV appearance was on an episode of the game show Street Smarts. He later appeared in the TV series Boston Public, Cold Case, The Shield, My Name Is Earl and most notably Nip/Tuck as the transgender character Cherry Peck. Throughout the 2000s he would go on to play small roles in many television shows. He also had a small role in the film American Wedding.

In 2008, Belli was featured on the single artwork for the song "Breakin' Up" by Rilo Kiley. He has also modeled as part of the Tranimal Master Class Workshop at the Machine Project, which was photographed by Austin Young.

=== 2009–2010: Drag career ===
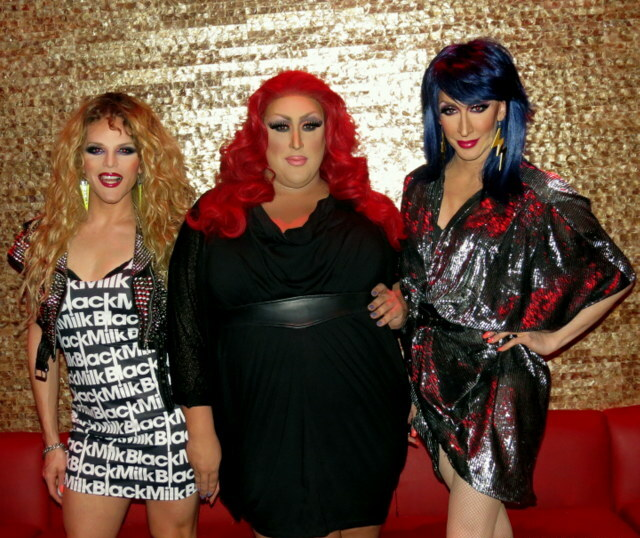
Belli with Vicky Vox and Detox Icunt, 2013

Belli is a member of the band Tranzkuntinental, which made its debut at The Roxy in 2009. The band was started by Charlie Paulson and Xander Smith and features drag queens Detox, Kelly Mantle, Rhea Litré, and Vicky Vox.

In January 2011, he was featured in Rihanna's music video "S&M" along with Detox and Morgan McMichaels as back-up dancers.

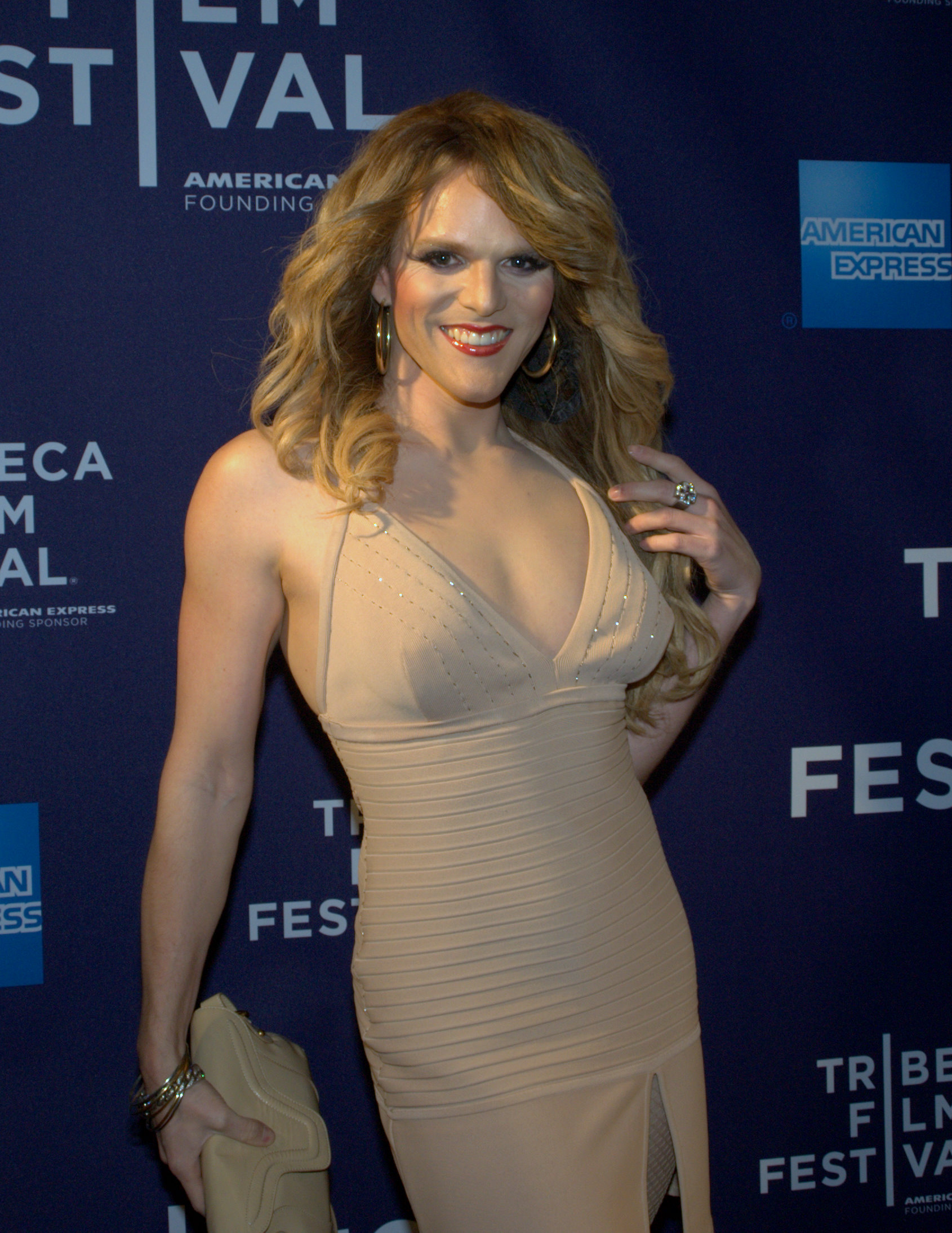
Willam at the premiere of Ticked-Off Trannies with Knives, 2010

=== 2011–2012: RuPaul's Drag Race and further success ===
World of Wonder contacted Willam's management asking for her to audition for the fourth season of RuPaul's Drag Race. She decided to apply after being rejected for an acting role in Don Johnson's pilot, A Mann's World, when the casting director of the pilot (which later went unaired), who had previously cast Willam in Cinema Verite, did not cast her because she was not a "name". The role later went to Cara Cunningham. In November 2011, Logo TV announced that Belli was among 13 contestants competing on the fourth season. Fellow castmate Chad Michaels had competed with Belli in the California Entertainer of the Year Pageant in 2010. Belli won the main challenges in the episodes "Float Your Boat" and "Frenemies", but was disqualified in the latter. In the episode "Reunited", Belli stated that her disqualification was due to conjugal visits made by his husband in his hotel room. In the years since airing season 4, however, Belli has refuted the "official story" in multiple interviews.

Belli's most recent reassertion about the circumstances of her disqualification is in an interview with YouTuber Joseph Shepherd in February 2019, where Belli claims that the so-called "official" reason was just a fabrication by the show's creators for the purpose of portraying a more palatable scenario of Belli's departure from the show. In that interview, Belli claimed that the genuine reason for his removal was due to increasing hostilities and issues between the contestants and the crew, and that, whenever she had broken the rules, she would report it directly to production in hopes of being removed from the show. Belli claims that many members of the crew were rude and condescending towards the drag queens in general, with some of the crew members not even bothering to try to learn the contestant's names—sharing one example of a crew member repeatedly calling season 4 fellow contestant Latrice Royale "La-something", despite all the crew having cards with the photographs of the queens/contestants (in and out of drag) worn around their necks. At one point, Belli verbally barked at a production member for not knowing Latrice's name "just because [Belli] felt like it". Belli, along with cast members such as Royale and Chad Michaels, attempted to make a stand against the production members.

Belli also claimed that, outside of filming hours, the queens were not being adequately fed, noting that $75 was all that was allocated to feed the 12 contestants. Belli claims that this necessitated visits to the store for food, also revealing that she frequently got other contestants high and/or drunk, attempted to steal items from the set such as feather fans and RuPaul-branded Ironfist shoes, and had access to a computer in her hotel room, which was outlawed by production, in order to run her "go-go boy side hustle". She additionally claimed to have had sex in the bathroom of Micky's Weho, a local club, with producer Steven Corfe, whom she had previously made apologize to her for asking her to leave Untucked after Belli spoke out about "emotional manipulation" being done to Jiggly Caliente over the one-year anniversary of her mother's death. As the two were being escorted out of the bathroom after being discovered having sex, Corfe is said to have thrown a cup at the performer on stage that night, fellow Drag Race alum Raven, getting the two ejected from the club. Outside of the club, the duo ran into more World of Wonder staff members, including Drag Race producer Chris McKim (claimed by Belli to be Corfe's best friend), who had to physically separate the two, as they were still "making out". Weeks later, Corfe allegedly contacted Belli again and invited her out to lunch with the intent to chat with her and "get [Belli] back in with World of Wonder", of which Belli obliged. According to Belli, the conjugal visit story was made up by producers and she agreed to "go along with the excuse" so that "everyone looked okay". Belli used the publicity of his disqualification to release his single "Chow Down", which was a parody of Wilson Phillips' "Hold On" that addressed the 2012 Chick-fil-A same-sex marriage controversy. The song featured Detox and Vicky Vox.

On March 12, 2012, she released her first single "Trouble", which was produced by RuPaul's Red Hot collaborator Tom Trujillo. The music video for the song was directed by porn director Chi Chi LaRue and premiered on Logo TV. On March 21, Belli released "The Vagina Song", a parody of "Billionaire" by Travie McCoy featuring Bruno Mars as his third single, which had been previously uploaded to YouTube in 2010. The music video was directed by Michael Serrato, who also directed Belli's music video for "Chow Down".

Belli released "Love You Like a Big Schlong" on April 29, 2012, which became a viral hit being viewed more than a million times on YouTube alone. Produced by Uncle Slam, the song parodies "Love You Like a Love Song" by Selena Gomez & the Scene. The song was inspired by Belli's loss to 7-year-old Eden Wood in a lip syncing contest during a segment of the 2012 NewNowNext Awards.

In November 2012, Belli was featured with country music artist Drake Jensen on a cover of Tammy Wynette's "Stand by Your Man". That same month, Belli self-released her debut album The Wreckoning via his website.

Belli has claimed that she was originally cast on the first season of RuPaul's Drag Race All Stars in 2012, but was dropped from the cast two days before filming was scheduled to begin. The reason given to Belli by production was that they did not see her "having stakes or stories with any of the girls". Belli believes that she was dropped from the cast because of her appearance on RuPaul's Drag U a few months prior, which she had only appeared on because another queen, later claimed to be Phi Phi O'Hara, had allegedly failed her background check, and, as Belli believes that she would have had the "most stakes" with Phi Phi (who no longer could appear on the show), resulted in Belli being dropped from the cast. She has also stated that she believes her replacement in the cast was Mimi Imfurst. Phi Phi later appeared on the next season of All Stars.

=== 2012–2013: YouTube career, "Boy Is a Bottom", and DWV success ===
Beginning in December 2012, Belli began a YouTube series associated with thestylishvids titled Willam's Beatdown. A comedy segment involving insult humor and video reviews, the series would eventually be renewed for a second, third, fourth, fifth and sixth season that then premiered on Belli's self-titled channel. In January 2013, Belli would have his biggest viral hit with 20 million hits on YouTube alone, when he released "Boy Is a Bottom", featuring Detox and Vicky Vox, to coincide with the fifth season premiere of RuPaul's Drag Race. Its timing and the use of social media made it a very well received release. The song is a parody of "Girl on Fire" by Alicia Keys and also features an altered version of the "breakdown" from "My Lovin' (You're Never Gonna Get It)" by En Vogue. "Boy Is a Bottom" debuted at number six on Billboard's Comedy Digital Songs, selling 3,000 downloads in its first week.

On August 14, 2013, Belli was featured along with Shangela, Detox, Raven, Morgan McMichaels, Landon Cider, Shannel, and Courtney Act, in Lady Gaga's lyric video for her single "Applause".

Belli's trio, including Detox and Vicky Vox, called DWV, officially split in June 2014 due to a personal conflict between the members.

=== 2014–2017: American Apparel, Shartistry in Motion, first book, perfume, and talk show ===
Belli then became an American Apparel Ad Girl alongside Drag Race alumni Courtney Act and Alaska Thunderfuck 5000, which they supported with a single titled "American Apparel Ad Girls". They also released a second single together, "Dear Santa, Bring Me a Man" for the Christmas season.

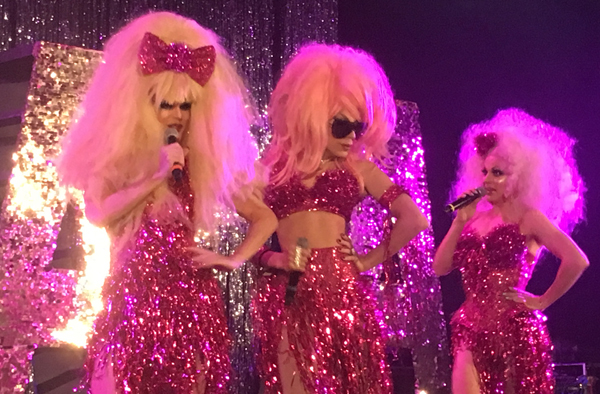
The AAA Girls performing in Denver, Colorado, 2017. Willam can be seen on the left, with Alaska in the middle and Courtney Act on the right.

On January 13, 2017, he released a solo version of the DWV hit "Boy Is a Bottom" in Spanish, titled "Es Una Pasiva", which went on to top the comedy iTunes chart. Belli self-released his second studio album, Shartistry in Motion, on June 2.

Belli released his first book Suck Less: Where There's a Willam, There's a Way in October 2016 through Grand Central Publishing. In 2017, he released his first perfume collaboration with Xyrena, Scented by Willam.

On May 18, 2017, it was revealed that Fullscreen had ordered a talk show to be hosted by Belli. Suck Less, billed as a weekly half-hour call-in show "where Willam throws shade and shows how to slay the game of life in six-inch stilettos" is set to debut in the summer. Friends from Belli's everyday life, as well as some of his favorite drag queens are expected to put in guest appearances over the course of the 13-episode series.

=== 2018–present: A Star Is Born, West End debut and other ventures ===
In 2018, Willam appeared in the critically acclaimed film A Star Is Born. Willam and fellow drag queen Shangela play queens working in a drag bar alongside Lady Gaga's character Ally when she's discovered by famous country singer Jackson Maine, played by Bradley Cooper. Willam's character, Emerald, is a Dolly Parton impersonator who flirts with Jackson. The dialogue in his scenes was mostly improvised, including a memorable moment in which his character has Jackson autograph her silicone breastplate. Bradley Cooper, who also directed the film, said that Willam and Shangela "blew his mind" with their ad-libbing.

On July 18, 2018, the first episode of Belli's Drag Race-themed podcast co-hosted with Alaska Thunderfuck and titled Race Chaser, was published on the Forever Dog Network. In 2020 Alaska and Belli announced that they would be setting up their own podcast network in collaboration with Forever Dog, Moguls of Media (MOM), featuring a "star-studded roster of iconic drag queens and queer luminaries" to bridge "the past, present, and future of LGBTQ+ entertainment". Podcasts established under the Moguls of Media brand and executive produced by Belli and Alaska include The Chop, hosted by Latrice Royale and Manila Luzon; Very That, hosted by Delta Work and Raja; Hi Jinkx!, hosted by Jinkx Monsoon; Famous This Week, hosted by Priyanka and formerly Brooke Lynn Hytes; Sloppy Seconds, hosted by Big Dipper and Meatball; Wanna Be On Top?, hosted by Shea Couleé; and Hall & Closet, hosted by Jaida Essence Hall and Heidi N Closet.

In 2019, Belli launched his own makeup line, Suck Less Face & Body. In June 2019, a panel of judges from New York magazine placed her ninth on their list of "the most powerful drag queens in America", a ranking of 100 former Drag Race contestants.

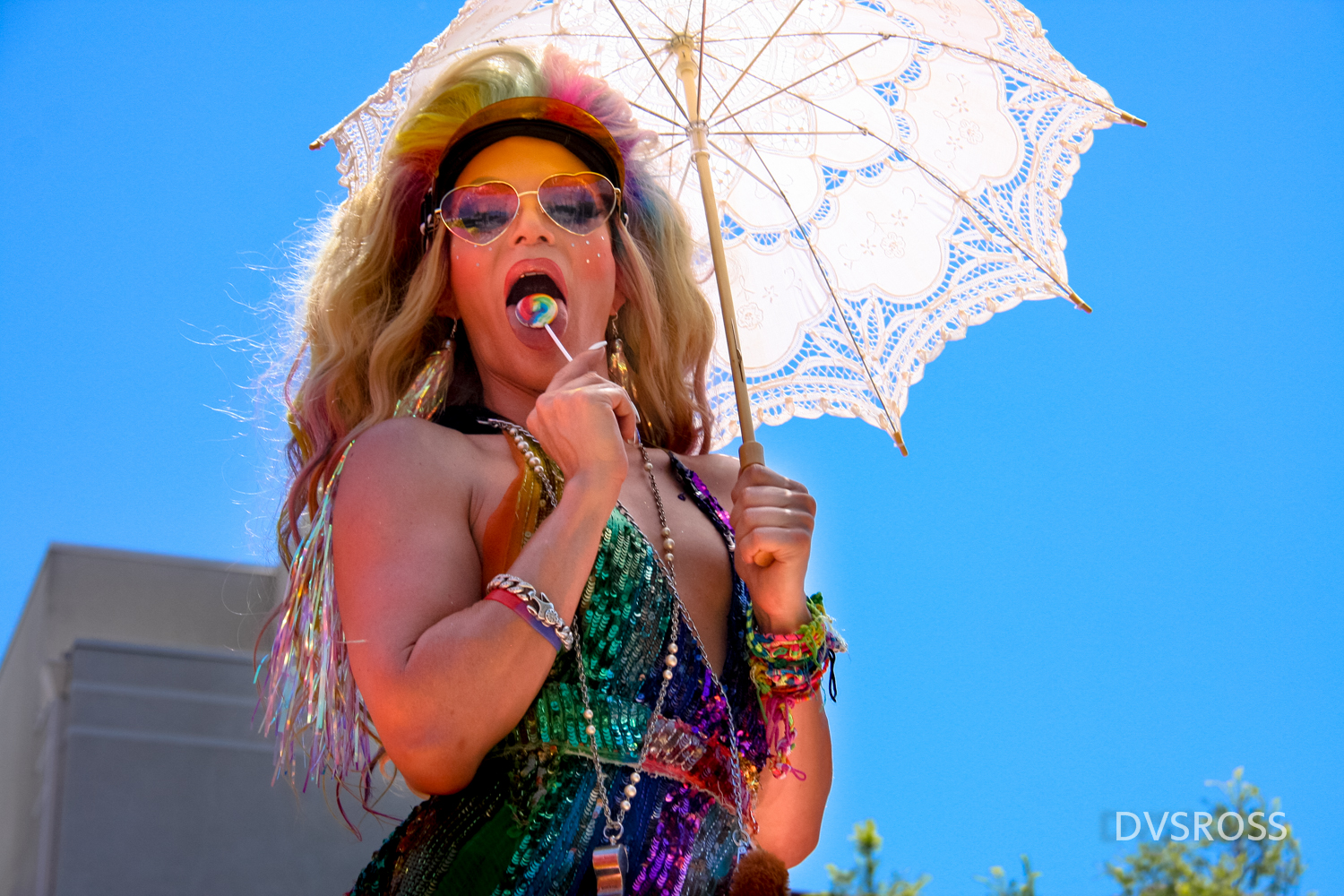
Willam at West Hollywood Pride, 2019

In 2021, Belli was announced as the star of Iconic Justice, a courtroom show in which Belli will hear and rule on various legal and social disputes between LGBTQ people.

In May 2021 Belli made their West End debut in the play Death Drop, an all-drag spoof on an Agatha Christie murder mystery, billed as "Dragatha Christie". They reprised the performance on a tour across the UK before returning to the West End in late 2022 to headline a sequel Death Drop: Back in the Habit again followed by a UK tour. They reprised their performance in the original play when it premiered Off-Broadway in Summer 2023.

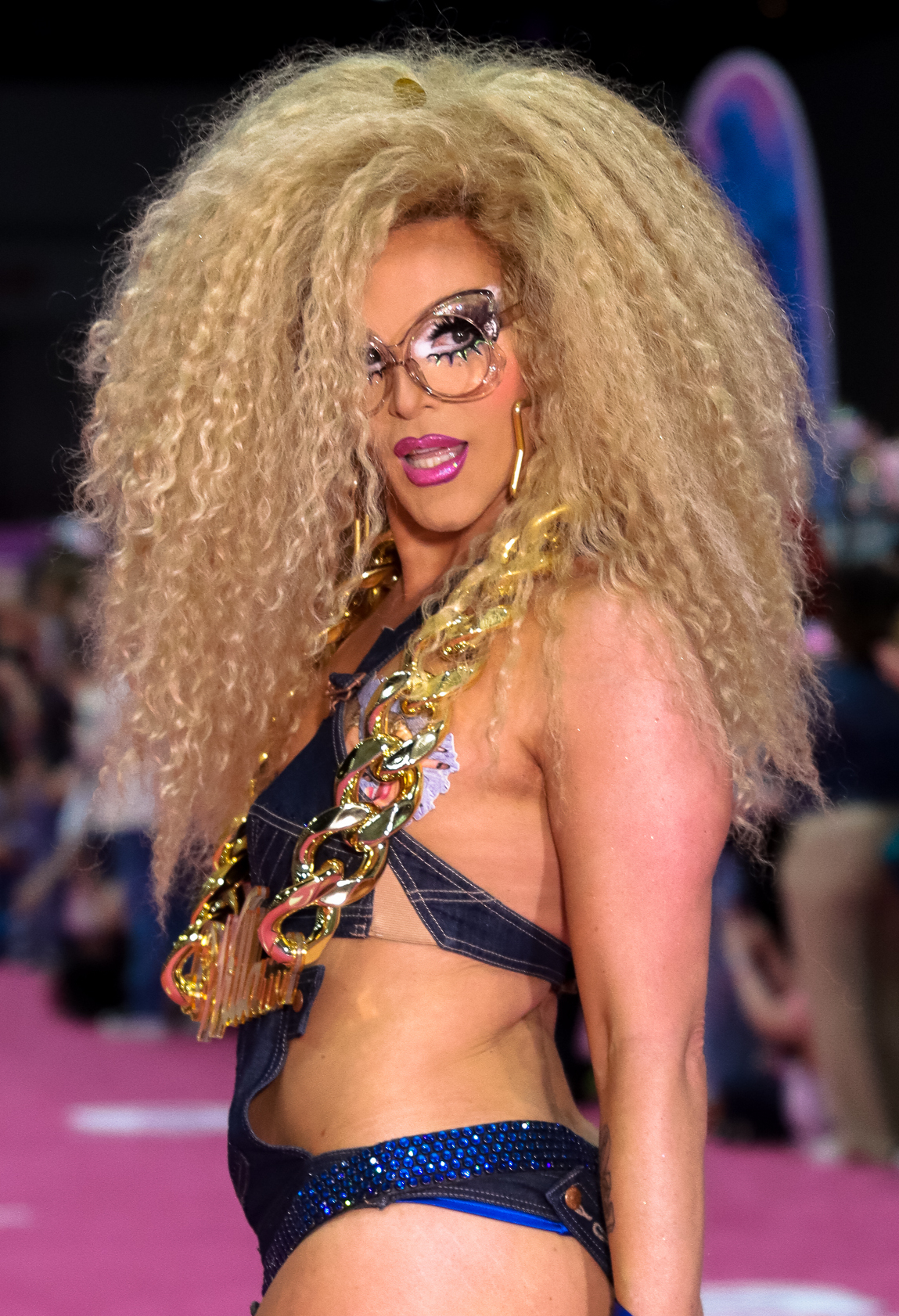
Willam at RuPaul's DragCon LA, 2023

== Filmography ==
=== Film ===
Year	Title	Role	Notes
2003	American Wedding	Butch Queen	
2004	The Last Shot	Bus Stop Drag Queen	
2005	Screech of the Decapitated	Marta	
2006	Big Top	Renee	
2006	Unbeatable Harold	Anita Boner	
2007	Because I Said So	Transsexual	
2008	Defying Gravity	Lola	
2008	Dog Tags	Alan	
2008	Another Gay Sequel: Gays Gone Wild!	Transamerican Stewardess Nancy Needatwat	
2008	Crowded	Celeste	Short film
2008	Tranny McGuyver	Officer Mac	Short film
2009	Sex Drugs Guns	Candy	
2009	Tools 4 Fools	Blonde Drag Queen	Short film
2010	Barry Munday	Felicia	Uncredited
2010	Ticked-Off Trannies with Knives	Rachel Slurr	
2010	Silver Lake	Dario	Short film
2010	Gaysharktank.com		Short film
2011	Blubberella	Vadge	also co-writer
2011	BloodRayne: The Third Reich	Vasyl Tishenko	
2011	2nd Take	Bathroom Tranny	
2011	Someplace Better Than Here	Travis	Short film
2012	The Newest Pledge	Sailor	
2012	Fun Size	Qwerty	
2012	Lost Angeles	Bob	also known as City of Jerks
2012	The Watch	Olivia	Uncredited
2012	Fake Fingernails, Cash and Viagra	Franklin	Short film
2013	X-Rated	Geoffrey Gann/'Karen Dior'	
2013	Southern Baptist Sissies	Benny	Television film
2015	Mouthpiece	Diva Bell	
2015	Hollywood	Champagne	
2016	Kicking Zombie Ass for Jesus	Beth Ann-Fetterman	
2016	Hurricane Bianca	Bailey	
2018	Joey Stefano	Geoffrey Gann/'Karen Dior'	
2018	A Star Is Born	Emerald	
2018	Miss Arizona	Destiny	
2019	Blue Call	Shineeda Drink	
2019	After Birth	Tammy	
2019	Swipe Left		
2019	A Very Sordid Wedding	Herself	
2019	Girls Will Be Girls	Prosecutor	
2019	A Beauty & The Beast Christmas	Officiant	Television film
2019	Trixie Mattel: Moving Parts	Herself	Documentary
2019	Dead Don't Die in Dallas	Beth-Anne Fetterman	

=== Television ===
Year	Title	Role	Notes
2002	The District	Darrin Jacobs	2 episodes
2003	Boston Public	Mike	Episode: "Chapter Fifty-Eight"
2004	The Shield	Colt	Episode: "Posse Up"
2004–06	Nip/Tuck	Cherry Peck	5 episodes
2005	My Name Is Earl	D.J.	Pilot
2006	Saved	Tippi	Episode: "Living Dead"
2007	Women's Murder Club	Sasha Simone	Episode: "To Drag & To Hold"
2007	CSI: NY	Candy Darling	Episode: "The Lying Game"
2007	American Body Shop	Wanda	Episode: "Stretchy Face"
2009	Criminal Minds	Walter Patterson	Episode: "To Hell... and Back"
2009	Southland	Shiela	Episode: "See the Woman"
2011	Cinema Verite	Candy Darling	Television film
2012	RuPaul's Drag Race (season 4)	Himself	Contestant (7th place)
2012	RuPaul's Drag Race: Untucked	Himself	10 episodes
2012	RuPaul's Drag U	Professor	Episode: "Ex-Beauty Queens"
2012	CSI: Crime Scene Investigation	Dahlia	Episode: "Code Blue Plate Special"
2013	The New Normal	Nana Drag Queen	Episode: "The Goldie Rush"
2013	She's Living for This	Herself	Season 2, Episode 1
2015	International Desk	Nassime	Episode: "Alps Plane Crash"; Reenactment
2016, 2018	Hit the Floor	Herself	Season 3, Episode 6: "Carrying"; Season 4, Episode 4: "Number's Up"
2016–2018	@midnight with Chris Hardwick	Herself	Season 4, Episode 27
2017	When We Rise	Jason Snyder	Season 1, Episode 4 and 5
2017	The Twins: Happily Ever After?	Herself/Landlord	Episodes: "Happily NEVER After?" and "Hoff and Running..."
2017	Dragula	Guest Judge	Season 2, Episode 1
2017	Difficult People	Kashton	Episode: "The Silkwood"
2018	Work Mom	Bob	Television film
2018	Super Drags	Lady Elza	Voice role
2018	The Kominsky Method	Cherry	Episode: "Chapter 8. A Widow Approaches"
2021	Iconic Justice	Judge Willam	5 episodes
2023	Drag Me to Dinner	Herself	Hulu original
2023	Celebrity Family Feud	Herself	Guest
2023	Accused	Layla	Guest
2025	For the Love of Dilfs	Herself	Guest Judge, season 3 episode 5
2025	2025 MTV Video Music Awards	Herself	Performer with Sabrina Carpenter, Laganja Estranja, Symone, Denali, and Lexi Love
2026	The Mob	Herself	Contestant (6th place)

=== Stage ===
Year	Title	Role	Venue	Notes
2021	Death Drop	Shazza	Garrick Theatre	West End
2021	Death Drop	Shazza	UK Tour	
2022	Death Drop: Back in the Habit	Sister Titus	Garrick Theatre	West End
2022	Death Drop: Back in the Habit	Sister Titus	UK Tour	
2023	Titanique	Victor Garber/Luigi	Daryl Roth Theatre	Off-Broadway production

=== Web ===
Year	Title	Role	Notes
2009	Road to the Alter	Jamie	WorkingBug; 2 episodes
2011	Good Job, Thanks!	Actress	Vimeo; Episode: "We All Need a Meeting"
2011	A Series Of Unfortunate People	Cami	WorkingBug/Dailymotion; Episode: "Bargain Birthday"
2012	Squad 85	Bar Attendee	YouTube/YOMYOMF; Episode 4
2012–13	Transfashionable	Himself	YouTube/The Stylist; 4 episodes
2012–2019	EastSiders	Douglas/Gomorrah Ray/Amber Alert	Vimeo/Logo TV/Netflix; 13 episodes Indie Series Awards Best Guest Actor — Drama (2016)
2013	Neil's Puppet Dreams	Performer	YouTube; Episode: Dream Bump
2013	Willam's Beatdown	Host	YouTube/The Stylist; 19 episodes
2013	30 Days of Willam	Host	Logo TV; 30 episodes
2013	Snore	Maid	Funny or Die; Parody of Downton Abbey set to "Vogue"
2013	The Fairfax File	Flame LaTouche	Funny or Die
2013	Rambo, But Gay	Deputy Mitch	YouTube/Nerdist
2014	Willam's This is not the Beatdown	Host	YouTube; 26 episodes
2014	Real World S#!t Show!	Host	MTV; 12 episodes
2014	Jiz	Spooge	Episode: "Jiz is Dead"; Episode: "Jiz Makes a CUMback"
2014	Mean Boyz	Teacher	YouTube; Parody trailer of Mean Girls
2014	Hollywoodland	Dinner Guest	YouTube; Episode 1
2014	Hey Qween!	Guest	YouTube
2014–present	Beatdown	Host	YouTube; 70 episodes
2014–present	Paint Me Bitch	Host	YouTube; 28 episodes
2015	The Dinner Bash	Himself	Episode 5: "Cocktails & Hens"; Episode 6: "Tranimal Cookies"
2015	Gay of Everything	Himself	YouTube; 1 episode
2015–16	Shane and Friends	Guest	Season 3, Episode 6 Season 4, Episode 7
2015–17	The WeHoans	Himself	YouTube/City of West Hollywood; Parody of The Californians; 7 episodes
2015–17	Billium's Wheatdown	Himself	YouTube; 11 episodes
2016	Straight Outta Oz	Himself	YouTube; Music video: "Expensive"
2016	Go-Go Boy Interrupted	Club Pantherwarmth Manager	YouTube; 2 episodes
2017	Suck Less	Host	Fullscreen; 13 episodes
2017	UNHhhh	Guest	YouTube; Episode 55
2017	Not Too Deep with Grace Helbig	Guest	Podcast
2018–present	¿Cómo Se Dice?	Host	YouTube co-hosted with Rhea Litré; 13 episodes
2018–present	Race Chaser	Host	Podcast co-hosted with Alaska Thunderfuck
2019	Exposed	Guest	YouTube; Hosted by Joseph Shepherd
2020	The X Change Rate	Guest	YouTube; Hosted by Monet X Change
2023	Tea Time with Attitude	Guest	YouTube; With Crystal
2023	Sissy That Talk Show with Joseph Shepherd	Podcast; Guest	YouTube
2025	Brooke Candy: Unwrapped	Guest	Podcast; Hosted by Brooke Candy

=== Music videos ===
Year	Title	Artist(s)	Ref.
2011	"S&M"	Rihanna	
2013	"Applause" Lyric video	Lady Gaga	
2016	"Expensive"	Todrick Hall	
2017	"Power"	Little Mix	
2018	"Girly"	John Duff	
2019	"Star Maps"	Aly & AJ	
2023	"True Colors"	Kylie Sonique Love	

== Discography ==
=== Albums ===
Title	Details	Chart peaks
Title	Details	US Comedy
The Wreckoning	Released: November 17, 2012; Label: Self-released; Format: CD, digital download	—
Shartistry in Motion	Released: June 2, 2015; Label: Self-released; Format: Digital download	1
Now That's What I Call Drag Music, Vol. 1 (alternatively known as Songs in the Key of Nope)	Released: October 26, 2018; Label: Self-released; Format: Digital download	4
"—" denotes a recording that failed to chart or was not released in that territory.

=== Singles ===
Title	Year	Peak chart positions	Album
Title	Year	US Comedy Digital	Album
"Trouble"	2012	—	The Wreckoning
"Chow Down" (featuring Detox & Vicky Vox)	2012	12	The Wreckoning
"The Vagina Song"	2012	—	The Wreckoning
"Love You Like a Big Schlong"	2012	25	The Wreckoning
"She Doesn't Know"	2012	—	The Wreckoning
"Let's Have a KaiKai" (featuring Rhea Litré)	2012	—	The Wreckoning
"Stand by Your Man" (featuring Drake Jensen)	2012	—	The Wreckoning
"RuPaulogize" (featuring Sharon Needles)	2013	14	The Wreckoning
"Potential New Boyfriend"	2013	—	The Wreckoning
"Boy Is a Bottom" (with DWV)	2013	6	Non-album singles
"Silicone" (with DWV)	2013	—	Non-album singles
"Blurred Bynes" (with DWV)	2013	5	Non-album singles
"That Christmas Song" (with DWV)	2013	—	Non-album singles
"Gaycation!" (with DWV)	2014	—	Non-album singles
"Hole Pic"	2014	—	Non-album singles
"Only Anally"	2014	—	Shartistry in Motion
"American Apparel Ad Girls" (with Courtney and Alaska)	2014	10	Shartistry in Motion
"Dear Santa, Bring Me a Man" (with Courtney and Alaska)	2014	—	Non-album single
"Es Una Pasiva"	2015	—	Shartistry in Motion
"Ride for AIDS" (featuring Alaska)	2015	12	Shartistry in Motion
"Thick Thighs" (featuring Latrice Royale)	2015	3	Shartistry in Motion
"I'm Not a Pearl"	2015	—	Non-album singles
"Uck Foff"	2016	12	Non-album singles
"AAA" (with Courtney and Alaska)	2017	2	Access All Areas
"—" denotes a recording that failed to chart or was not released in that territory.

== Tours ==
- Access All Areas Tour (2017)

== Bibliography ==
- Suck Less: Where There's a Willam, There's a Way. Grand Central Publishing. 2016. ISBN 978-1455566198.

== Awards and nominations ==
=== Daytime Emmy Awards ===
Belli was nominated for his performance on the Netflix dark comedy web series EastSiders at the 47th Daytime Emmy Awards.

Year	Nominee / work	Award	Result
2020	EastSiders	Outstanding Supporting Actor in a Digital Daytime Drama Series	Nominated
2020	EastSiders	Outstanding Makeup	Nominated

=== NewNowNext Awards ===
Belli was nominated for his role on RuPaul's Drag Race at the fifth annual NewNowNext Awards which aired on Logo network on April 9, 2012. He lost to Nadia G. of Bitchin' Kitchen which airs on the Food Network Canada and the Cooking Channel.

Year	Nominee / work	Award	Result
2012	Willam Belli	Most Addictive Reality Star	Nominated

=== Queerty Awards ===
Year	Nominee / work	Award	Result
2019	Race Chaser	Podcast	Won
2020	Race Chaser	Podcast	Won
2021	Race Chaser	Podcast	Runner-up
2022	Willam Belli	Drag Royalty	Nominated
2022	Race Chaser	Podcast	Won
2023	Access All Areas: The AAA Girls Tour	Documentary	Won
2024	Race Chaser	Podcast	Won

=== Webby Awards ===
Year	Nominee / work	Award	Result
2020	Race Chaser	Podcasts - Television & Film	Honored
