= DWV (group) =

American pop group

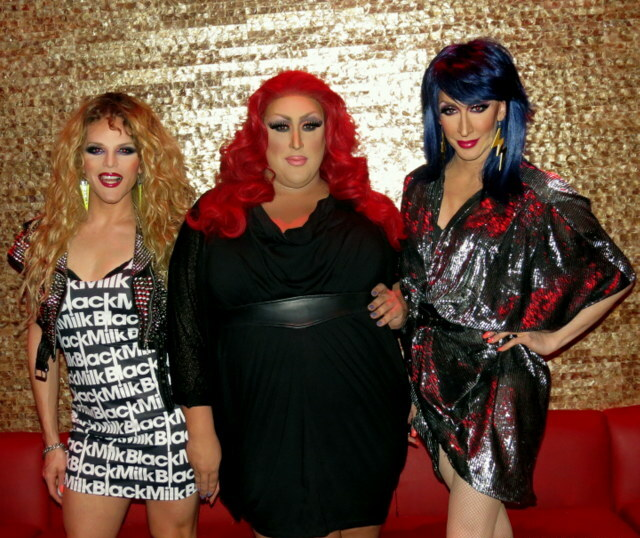
- DWV in 2013. From left: Willam, Vicky, and Detox

Background information
- Origin: Los Angeles, California, U.S.
- Genres: Hip hop; parody; pop; R&B
- Years active: 2012–2014
- Past members: Willam Belli; Detox; Vicky Vox
- Website: willambelli.com

DWV was an American pop group based in Los Angeles, consisting of drag queens Detox, Willam Belli, and Vicky Vox. They found fame with the release of "Chow Down (at Chick-Fil-A)" in March 2012, a parody of "Hold On" by Wilson Phillips, satirizing Chick-fil-A's controversial stance on gay marriage. The single's music video went viral online. They followed this up with the January 2013 release of "Boy Is a Bottom", a parody of the Alicia Keys song "Girl on Fire", which proved to be even more popular, amassing 25.8 million views on YouTube, as of 2022.

Between 2012 and 2014, DWV released seven singles together commercially, three of which charted on the Billboard Comedy Digital Songs chart.

In June 2014, it was officially confirmed by all three members on social media platforms that the group had split.

== History ==
=== Drag Race beginnings ===
Willam Belli was a contestant on the fourth season of RuPaul's Drag Race, which premiered in 2012 while Detox was a contestant on the fifth season of RuPaul's Drag Race, which premiered in January 2013. Vicky Vox has yet to make an appearance on Drag Race. The three queens began working together, releasing music, and touring as a group in 2012 following Willam's appearance on Drag Race.

=== Viral success ===
In March 2012, DWV released their first collaborative single "Chow Down (at Chick-fil-A)" on Belli's personal YouTube channel. The song, a parody of "Hold On" by Wilson Phillips satirizing Chick-fil-A's controversial stance on gay marriage, went viral online.

In December 2012, DWV embarked on a 60-day world tour, promoting their singles throughout North America, Europe, Australia, and also in Dubai.

In January 2013, following up on the success of their first single, DWV released another music video, this time for their single "Boy Is a Bottom", coinciding with the premiere of the fifth season of RuPaul's Drag Race, on which Detox was a contestant. The song is a parody of the Inferno version of Alicia Key's "Girl on Fire". The song features lyrics that satirize sex positions, specifically tops and bottoms during anal intercourse. The song proved to be even more popular than their previous single, amassing 25 million views on YouTube, as of 2021.

In May 2013, DWV released "Silicone", alongside the premiere of the reunion episode of the RuPaul's Drag Race season five. Written by Willam Belli, the song is a parody of Robyn's "Dancing On My Own". The single marked the singing debut of Detox, who usually rapped verses in the group's songs rather than singing them. It also is the first to have been released officially under the DWV group name.

In 2013, DWV became the faces of a limited edition selection of OCC Makeup Lip Tar and & Nail Lacquer packs.

In September 2013, DWV released another single called "Blurred Bynes", a parody of Robin Thicke's "Blurred Lines". The song pokes fun at Amanda Bynes' new image on social media including her hair, new breast implants, and her infamous tweet to Drake. On 10 December 2013, DWV released a Christmas single, "That Christmas Song", using many elements of TLC's All That. On March 8, 2014, they released another single and music video called "Gaycation".

Between 2012 and 2014, DWV released seven singles together commercially, three of which charted on the Billboard Comedy Digital Songs chart.

=== Breakup ===
In June 2014, rumors circulated on social media platforms that the trio had broken up and all three members addressed the situation, confirming that they had chosen to part ways due to conflicts between them. Belli tweeted that DWV had broken up because "it was just time", Vox stated that "it was fun for a while", and Detox lamented feeling "piegon-holed" by the group. Belli subsequently posted that "DMV is dead" on Facebook and explained further in a response on Tumblr:

We never planned stuff really and we just don't have anything coming up. We were just friends putting songs out who then turned into DWV. I would think of something and then we'd round up and do it (exception- Chow Down we all thought of and Gaycation was De's idea but we all wrote). We no longer have time to make stuff happen like we once did. That's the reality of it. I think when people paid us to be the supergroup DWV for their own products, the ending result video wasn't as whoreganic and fun as what we were known for.The last two years have been a whirlwind of unexpectedness that I wouldn't trade for anything but I am looking forward to dealing with one tranimal instead of three for a while professionally. It's just less variables and I'm a creative despot.

== Members ==
Willam Belli (born June 30, 1982) is an American actor, drag queen, and singer-songwriter from Philadelphia, based in Los Angeles. She first gained fame for her recurring role as a transgender woman named Cherry Peck in Ryan Murphy's television series Nip/Tuck. Willam achieved further prominence as a contestant on the fourth season of RuPaul's Drag Race in 2012, but was disqualified in the "Frenemies" challenge episode, marking the show's first disqualification. In 2018, she appeared in the critically acclaimed film A Star Is Born. For her performance on the dark comedy web series EastSiders, she was nominated for a Daytime Emmy Award for Outstanding Supporting Actor in a Digital Daytime Drama Series. In June 2019, a panel of judges from New York magazine placed her ninth on their list of "the most powerful drag queens in America", a ranking of 100 former Drag Race contestants.

Deandra Sanderson (born June 3, 1985), known mononymously as Detox, is an American drag queen and recording artist from Orlando, based in California. Detox was a contestant on season five of RuPaul's Drag Race, placing fourth, and also competed on the second season of All Stars, placing as a runner-up. Detox has appeared in music videos with Ke$ha and Rihanna and is a member of Chad Michaels' Dreamgirls Revue, the longest-running female-impersonation show in California. In June 2019, a panel of judges from New York magazine placed her 14th on their list of "the most powerful drag queens in America", a ranking of 100 former Drag Race contestants.

Vicky Vox is an American actor, drag queen, and singer-songwriter based in California. Vox is Detox's drag daughter. She is known for performing live instead of lip syncing. In 2015, she played a supporting role in the 2015 feature film Magic Mike XXL. She also has her own YouTube web series called The Vicky Vox Project, and has performed on stage in a London production of Little Shop Of Horrors.

== Discography ==
=== Singles ===
Year	Song	Peak chart positions	Album
Year	Song	US Comedy Digital Songs	Album
2012	"Chow Down" (Willam Belli featuring Detox & Vicky Vox)	12	The Wreckoning
2012	"Starfucker" (Willam Belli featuring Detox & Vicky Vox)	—	The Wreckoning
2013	"Boy Is a Bottom"	6	Non-album singles
2013	"Silicone"	—	Non-album singles
2013	"Blurred Bynes"	5	Non-album singles
2013	"That Christmas Song"	—	Non-album singles
2014	"Gaycation"	—	Non-album singles

== See also ==
- Girl groups in the Drag Race franchise
- The AAA Girls
- List of drag groups
