= Michael Keller (filmmaker) =

American independent filmmaker

- Occupation(s): Screenwriter, film director, cinematographer, editor, filmmaker
- Years active: 2010–present

Michael Keller is an American independent filmmaker. He was the writer, director, cinematographer, and editor for the film Red Gold, a social crime drama about the illegal organ trade.

Red Gold was shown at various international film festivals and profiled in New Jersey Stage, and premiered at the Garden State Film Festival in Atlantic City, New Jersey, on April 5, 2014. It won "Best International Thriller" at the 2014 Manhattan Film Festival, and received a "rave" review by Film Threat.

== Filmography ==
- Red Gold (Producer)
