= Detox (drag queen) =

American drag performer and recording artist

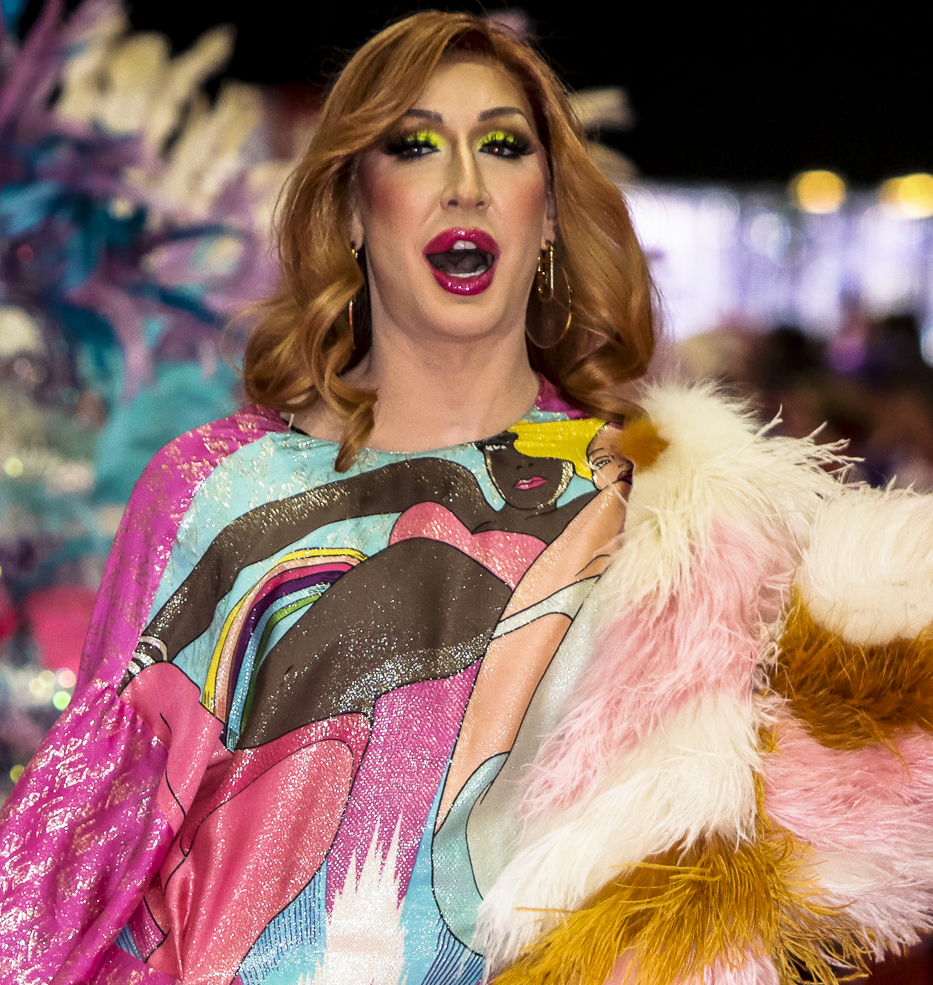
- Detox at RuPaul's DragCon LA, 2022
- Born: June 3, 1985 (age 41); Orlando, Florida, U.S.
- Other names: Detox, Sebastian Ford, Deandra Sanderson
- Occupations: Drag performer, reality television personality, recording artist
- Years active: 2012–present
- Known for: RuPaul's Drag Race (season 5); RuPaul's Drag Race All Stars (season 2)
- Musical career
- Formerly of: DWV
- Website: theonlydetox.com

Deandra Sanderson, better known by the stage name Detox Icunt or simply Detox, is an American drag performer and recording artist. Detox was a fixture of the Southern California drag scene before coming to international attention on the fifth season of RuPaul's Drag Race, as well as the second season of RuPaul's Drag Race All Stars.

== Career ==
Detox has appeared in music videos with Ke$ha and Rihanna and is a member of Chad Michaels' Dreamgirls Revue, the longest-running female-impersonation show in California. She is also a member of the band Tranzkuntinental. The band was started by Charlie Paulson and Xander Smith and features drag queens Kelly Mantle, Rhea Litré, Vicky Vox, and Willam Belli.

Detox modeled as part of the Tranimal Master Class Workshop at the Machine Project. The event was photographed by Austin Young. In 2011, Detox acted in Showgirls in Drag, a live adaptation of Showgirls. The production was directed by Stephen Guarino and played at the Dragonfly nightclub in Hollywood.

She started doing drag at 15 when working with her sister, and originally went by the name Cornanda Cobb. In March 2012, Willam Belli released "Chow Down," a parody of "Hold On" by Wilson Phillips. The song featured Detox and Vicky Vox, who co-wrote the parody's lyrics. The three began performing under the name DWV, a dual reference that takes note of their first initials (Detox, Willam and Vicky) while also parodying the group SWV. Together they released several other singles: "Boy is a Bottom", a parody of "Girl on Fire" by Alicia Keys which debuted at number six on Billboard's Comedy Digital Songs, selling 3,000 downloads in its first week.; "Silicone", a parody of "Dancing on My Own" by Robyn; and "Blurred Bynes", a parody of "Blurred Lines" by Robin Thicke. In April 2019, Lizzo released a second music video for her song "Juice", in which Detox makes an appearance.

=== RuPaul's Drag Race ===
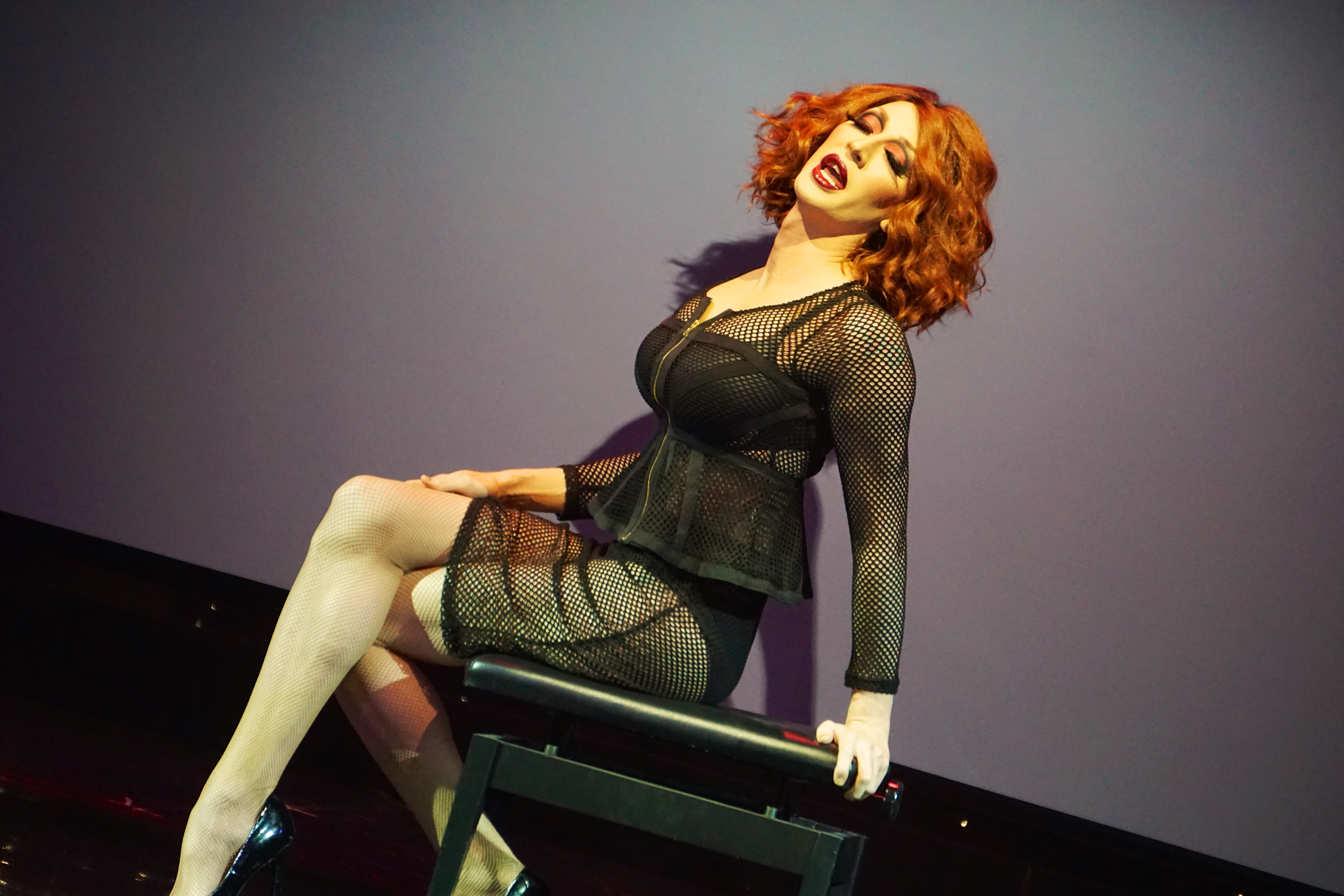
Detox performing in 2014

In November 2012, Logo announced that Detox was among 14 contestants who would be competing on the fifth season of RuPaul's Drag Race. Detox won the children's TV show-themed main challenge in the episode "Draggle Rock". As part of the show, Detox sang on the "We Are the World"-inspired song "Can I Get an Amen?", with the song's proceeds benefiting the Los Angeles Gay and Lesbian Center. Detox placed fourth overall, and was the last queen eliminated before the finale.

In 2016, Detox was announced as one of the cast members on the second season of RuPaul's All Stars Drag Race. She ultimately finished as a runner up in the competition alongside Katya. In 2017, Detox appeared in the film Cherry Pop, directed by Assaad Yacoub, alongside fellow Drag Race alumni Tempest DuJour, Mayhem Miller and Bob the Drag Queen. In 2019, a panel of judges from New York magazine placed Detox 14th on their list of "the most powerful drag queens in America", a ranking of 100 former Drag Race contestants. She was one of 37 queens to appear on the cover.

== Personal life ==
Detox came out as transgender in August 2024 and uses the pronouns she/they. She comes from a military family and spent her childhood in Mesa, Arizona, Hope Mills, North Carolina, Wilson, North Carolina, and Anna Maria Island, Florida. She has a twin brother.

== Discography ==
=== Singles ===
Title	Year	Peak chart positions	Album
Title	Year	US Comedy	Album
"Chow Down" (Willam Belli featuring Detox and Vicky Vox)	2012	12	The Wreckoning
"Boy Is a Bottom" (Vicky Vox featuring Detox and Willam Belli)	2013	6	Non-album singles
"Can I Get an Amen?" (RuPaul featuring the Cast of RuPaul's Drag Race Season 5)	2013	—	Non-album singles
"Silicone" (Detox featuring Willam Belli and Vicky Vox)	2013	—	Non-album singles
"Blurred Bynes" (Detox featuring Willam Belli and Vicky Vox)	2013	—	Non-album singles
"This Is How We Jew It"	2015	—	Christmas Queens
"Supersonic"	2016	—	Non-album singles
"She's Gotta Habit"	2017	—	Non-album singles
"#SueList"	2018	—	Non-album singles
"I Like It Like That"	2018	—	Non-album singles
"El Camino" (with Ellis Miah)	2020	—	Non-album singles
"Fleuressence" (featuring Danny Boy Steward)	2022	—	Non-album singles

=== Other appearances ===
Song	Year	Album
"Pretty Lady" (Kesha featuring Lady Lloyd and Detox)	2012	N/A (Unreleased Track)
"Starfucker" (Willam Belli featuring Detox and Vicky Vox)	2012	The Wreckoning
"Read U Wrote U" (RuPaul featuring Detox, Katya, Alaska & Roxxxy Andrews)	2016	Non-album singles

== Filmography ==
=== Television ===
Year	Title	Role	Notes
2013	RuPaul's Drag Race	Herself	Season 5 (4th place)
2013	RuPaul's Drag Race: Untucked	Herself	Season 5 (4th place)
2013	NewNowNext Awards	Herself	
2014	Drag Queens of London	Herself	Episode 2
2015	Skin Wars	Herself	
2016	RuPaul's Drag Race All Stars	Herself	Season 2 (Runner-up)
2017	Gay for Play Game Show Starring RuPaul	Herself	
2018	Botched	Herself	Season 4, episode 19
2023	Drag Me to Dinner	Herself	Hulu original
2025	Below Deck Sailing Yacht	Herself	Season 5, Episode 13 & 14

=== Web series ===
Year	Title	Role	Notes	Ref
2012–13	Neil's Puppet Dreams	Drag performer	Episode 5: "Dream Bump"	
2014-2018	Hey Qween!	Herself	Guest; 3 episodes	
2015	Oh, Pit Crew!	Host		
2020	Werq the World	Herself	Featured queen	
2022-2024	Very Delta	Herself	Episode 3: "Are You Beguiled By a Bargain Like Me?"	
2022-2024	Very Delta	Herself	Episode 98: "Are You A Fashion Wellness Queen Like Me?"	
2023	The Pit Stop	Herself	Guest	
2024	Give It to Me Straight	Herself	Guest	

=== Film ===
Year	Title	Role	Notes
2017	Cherry Pop	White Chocolate	Credited as Detox; Direct to video

=== Music video appearances ===
Year	Song	Director
2008	"Disturbia" (Rihanna)	Anthony Mandler
2008	"Undead" (Hollywood Undead)	Jonas Åkerlund
2010	"Backstabber" (Kesha)	
2010	"Miami" (Foals)	
2010	"Take It Off" (Version 2) (Kesha)	SKINNY
2010	"Sleazy Remix 2.0: Get Sleazier" (Kesha)	Nicholaus Goossen
2011	"S&M" (Rihanna)	Melina Matsoukas
2012	"Gimme All Your Blood" (Jackie Beat)	Austin Young
2012	"Prom Night" (Jeffree Star)	Robby Starbuck
2013	"Applause" (Lyric video) (Lady Gaga)	Lady Gaga
2015	"Love Slave" (Pearl)	Michael Serrato
2015	"Hieeee" (Alaska Thunderfuck)	Ben Simkins
2018	"Juice" (Lizzo)	Pete Williams
2020	"Nerves of Steel" (Erasure)	Brad Hammer
2020	"Cum" (Brooke Candy ft. Iggy Azalea)	Dejan Jovanovic
