= Boy Is a Bottom =

"Boy Is A Bottom"

Single by Willam Belli featuring Detox and Vicky Vox (DWV)
- Released: January 26, 2013
- Length: 3:46
- Songwriters: Willam Belli; Detox; Vicky Vox
- Producer: Markaholic

Willam Belli singles chronology
"Stand by Your Man" (2012)	"Boy Is A Bottom" (2013)	"RuPaulogize" (2013)

Detox singles chronology
"Chow Down" (2012)	"Boy Is a Bottom" (2013)	"Can I Get an Amen?" (2013)

Music video
- "Boy Is a Bottom" on YouTube

"Boy Is a Bottom" is a song by American singer and drag queen Willam Belli, featuring Detox and Vicky Vox (DWV). The song was released to coincide with the fifth season premiere of RuPaul's Drag Race. The original music video went viral. As of March 2024, the clip has been viewed over 27 million times since uploaded to YouTube on January 28, 2013.

On January 13, 2015, Willam released a Spanish version of the song, called "Es Una Pasiva".

== Background and composition ==
The song is a parody of "Girl on Fire" by Alicia Keys and also features an altered version of the "breakdown" from "My Lovin' (You're Never Gonna Get It)" by En Vogue. "Bottom" (or passive) is a term referring to a male who prefers to be on the receiving end of gay anal sex, the opposite of a "top" (or active); one who has no particular preference may be considered "versatile", or a "vers". The terms pasivo and activo are commonly used in Spanish. Willam had previously collaborated with Detox and Vicky Vox on "Chow Down", a parody of "Hold On" by Wilson Phillips. The song was written by Willam Belli, Detox, and Vicky Vox and was produced by Markaholic.

The Spanish version of the song, "Es Una Pasiva", includes interpolations of "La Bamba" by Ritchie Valens, "La Isla Bonita" by Madonna, "Macarena" by Los Del Rio and "Bidi Bidi Bom Bom" by Selena.

== Critical reception ==
Andrew Villagomez, writing for Out, described the song as a "juicy and fantastic musical number".

== Commercial performance ==
"Boy Is a Bottom" debuted at number six on Billboard's Comedy Digital Songs, selling 3,000 downloads in its first week. Willam has had two previous songs on the chart but neither cracked the top ten.

== Live performances ==
Willam, Detox, and Vicky Vox performed the song at the 2013 White Party in Palm Springs, California. The trio also performed on the main stage of the San Francisco Pride festival on July 9, 2013, just before DWV disbanded. Willam performed the song as part of New York City's Gay Pride Parade 2014. After the group split, Willam released a Spanish version called "Es Una Pasiva". This version is the one he now performs live, stating that he can no longer perform the English version as a soloist.

== Track listing ==
Digital download (Video Edit)
No.	Title	Length
1.	"Boy Is a Bottom"	3:45

Digital download (Double Penetration Extended Mix)
No.	Title	Length
1.	"Boy Is a Bottom"	4:05

== Charts ==
Chart (2013)	Peak position
US Comedy Digital Songs (Billboard)	6
