= Neil's Puppet Dreams =

- Created by: Neil Patrick Harris; David Burtka; Janet Varney
- Written by: David Burtka; Brian Clark; Michael Serrato; Kirk Thatcher; Janet Varney
- Directed by: Kirk Thatcher
- Starring: Neil Patrick Harris; David Burtka
- Country of origin: United States
- Original language: English
- No. of seasons: 1
- No. of episodes: 7

Production
- Executive producers: David Burtka; Chris Hardwick; Neil Patrick Harris; Brian Henson; Seth Laderman; Janet Varney
- Producer: Ritamarie Peruggi
- Editor: Q. Bryce Randle
- Production companies: Henson Alternative; Nerdist Industries

Original release
- Network: The Nerdist Channel
- Release: November 27, 2012 – January 22, 2013

Neil's Puppet Dreams is a web series created by The Jim Henson Company under its Henson Alternative banner and released on The Nerdist Channel. The series stars Neil Patrick Harris who helped to create the series.

== Plot ==
This web series features Neil Patrick Harris who lives with his partner David Burtka. Neil sleeps a lot and has strange dreams featuring puppet characters. Neil opens each episode by directly telling the audience "Hi, I'm Neil. I sleep a lot and when I dream, I dream in puppet." He then promptly falls asleep and has a puppet dream.

== Episodes ==
1. The Lullabye (November 27, 2012) - Neil has a dream where he is falling through the sky in a dream world and a few puppets show up and sing a song to comfort him which only increases Neil's panic.
2. Doctor's Office (December 4, 2012) - Neil visits a doctor named Dr. Mayfair (played by Nathan Fillion) to talk to him about the puppet dreams that he has been having lately. Neil falls asleep and dreams that he is visiting a puppet doctor named Dr. Feltman where his unique physiology causes a stir in the puppet medical community.
3. The Restaurant (December 11, 2012) - Neil grapples with pushy customers and punny puns when he dreams that he is a waiter at a restaurant.
4. To Catch a Puppeteer (December 18, 2012) - Neil's questionable dream moral gets him into a handful of trouble when Puppet Chris Hansen shows up in Neil's dream called "To Catch a Puppeteer."
5. Dream Bump (January 8, 2013) - The dreams of Neil and David collide when David's dream consists of dancers, drag performers (played by Willam Belli and Detox Icunt), and an appearance by Joe Manganiello.
6. Alien Abduction (January 16, 2013) - Neil dreams that he has been abducted by aliens and tries to get them to probe him.
7. Bollywood (January 22, 2013) - While watching a Bollywood film with David, Neil falls asleep and dreams that he is in a Bollywood musical where he is in love with a cow named Bessie (voiced by Daniele Gaither).

== Cast ==
- Neil Patrick Harris - Himself
- David Burtka - Himself

=== Puppeteers ===
- Brian Clark - Rabbit (ep. 1), Winky the Trouser Weasel (ep. 2), Puppet Chris Hansen (ep. 4), Alien (ep. 6)
- Nathan Danforth - Beaver (ep. 3), Vulture (ep. 3), Health Inspector Mouse (ep. 3), Turtle (ep. 7)
- Brian Henson - Jumper (ep. 1)
- Donna Kimball - Doll (ep. 1), Female Nurse (ep. 2), Wife (ep. 3)
- Drew Massey - Squirrel (ep. 1), Male Nurse (ep. 2), Caveman Chef (ep. 3), Husband (ep. 3)
- Colleen Smith - Rabbit (ep. 1), AbbyCadable2 (ep. 4), Anne (ep. 5), Alien (ep. 6)
- Allan Trautman - Rabbit (ep. 1), Dr. Feltman (ep. 2), Monkey (ep. 3), Shelley Oceans as the Drag Queen (ep. 5), Alien (ep. 6)
- Victor Yerrid - Goat (ep. 1), Warthog (ep. 2), Old Man (ep. 3), Hot Dog (ep. 3), Alan (ep. 5)

== Reception ==
=== Awards and nominations ===
In April 2013, Neil's Puppet Dreams was nominated for a Webby Award in the "Best Comedy: Long Form or Series" category.

Year	Award	Category	Nominee	Outcome
2013	Webby Award	Best Comedy: Long Form or Series	Neil's Puppet Dreams	Nominated
