= Rhea Litré =

American drag queen

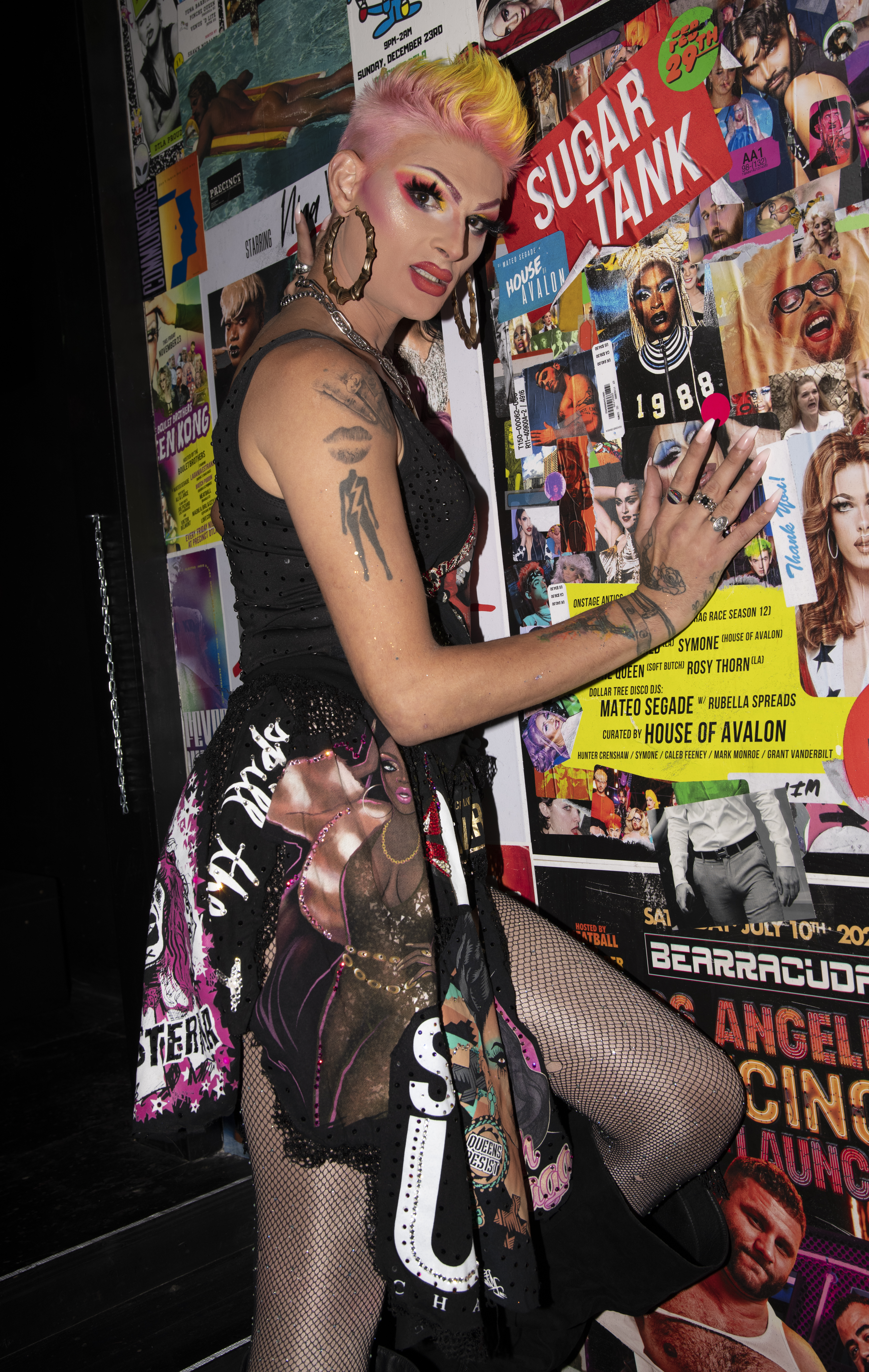
- Rhea Litré in 2023
- Born: Joshua Miller; October 28, 1984 (age 41); San Diego, California,
- Occupations: Drag queen; DJ; singer; songwriter

Rhea Litré (born Joshua Miller on October 28, 1984) is an American drag queen, singer, songwriter, and DJ. Miller is a fixture in West Hollywood nightlife.

== Career ==
After graduating from high school, Miller moved to Los Angeles to audition for the second season of American Idol. He first performed in drag at Oasis Nightclub's Drag Idol in 2004 in Upland, California. Raja and Mayhem Miller are Litré's drag mothers.

Litré was a member of the band Tranzkuntinental, which made its debut at The Roxy in 2009. The band was started by Charlie Paulson and Xander Smith and featured drag queens Willam Belli, Detox Icunt, Kelly Mantle, and Vicky Vox.

In 2012, Willam Belli and Rhea Litré released "Let's Have a Kai Kai." The song parodied "Let's Have a Kiki" by the Scissor Sisters. The music video was directed by Shawn Adeli and featured an appearance by Chi Chi LaRue.

In 2013, Litré walked the Marco Marco runway for Los Angeles Fashion Week. Other models included former RuPaul's Drag Race contestants.

Litré has released a series of singles including "America's Next Hot Bottom" in 2013, "UCC" in 2015, and "Lovergirl" in 2016.

== Discography ==
=== Singles ===
Song	Year	Album
"Let's Have a KaiKai" (Willam Belli & Rhea Litré)	2012	The Wreckoning
"America's Next Hot Bottom"	2013	Non-album single
"Ucc" (Willam Belli & Rhea Litré)	2015	Shartistry in Motion

== Filmography ==
=== Film ===
Year	Title	Role	Notes
2010	Steven Daigle XXXposed	Himself	Produced by C1R/Rascal Video
2013	America's Next Hot Bottom	Himself	Produced by Jet Set Men

=== Television ===
Year	Title	Role	Notes
2007	America's Next Top Model	Himself	Season 8, Episode 6: "The Girl Who Takes Credit"
2010	American Music Awards	Himself	Performing with P!nk
2011	Hair Battle Spectacular	Himself	Season 2, Episode 4: "My Male Model Is Prettier Than Yours"
2011	RuPaul's Drag Race	Himself	Season 3, Episode 1: "Casting Extravaganza"

=== Music videos ===
Year	Song	Director
2010	"If I Had You" (Adam Lambert)	Bryan Barber
2010	"I Want It All" (Kat Graham)	Lance Drake
2010	"Sassy" (Kat Graham)	Paul Hogan & Adam Forstadt
2011	"Go" (Kari Kimmel)	Eddie Tran
2012	"How We Do (Party)" (Rita Ora)	Marc Klasfeld
2013	"Ru Girl" (Alaska Thunderfuck)	Carly Usdin
2014	"Really Don't Care" (Demi Lovato featuring Cher Lloyd)	Ryan Pallotta
2014	"Ransom" (MOXXI)	Kavan the Kid & Nova Rockafeller
2015	"Head To Mistletoe" (Courtney Act)	Kain O'Keefe
2015	"Beauty And The Beat Boots" (Todrick Hall featuring Colleen Ballinger)	Todrick Hall
