= Christmas Queens 2 =

Compilation album by various artists
- Released: November 11, 2016
- Genre: Christmas; parody
- Length: 58:54
- Label: Producer Entertainment Group

Various artists chronology
Christmas Queens (2015)	Christmas Queens 2 (2016)	Christmas Queens 3 (2017)

Christmas Queens 2 is a holiday compilation album by various artists. It was released by Producer Entertainment Group on November 11, 2016. Consisting of 30 tracks, the album is a sequel to Christmas Queens (2015) and features RuPaul's Drag Race contestants alongside Jackie Beat, Michelle Visage, and Carnie Wilson performing mostly original material; exceptions include ensemble covers of "Deck the Halls" and "Auld Lang Syne, as well as Visage's rendition of "O Holy Night". The compilation was promoted by a music video for "Working Holiday", which features Alaska Thunderfuck and Manila Luzon, a web series entitled Christmas Queens, and a tour by various artists with December 2016 shows in the United Kingdom, Canada, and the United States. It received mixed reviews from music critics and peaked at number two on Billboard's Comedy Albums chart.

== Composition ==
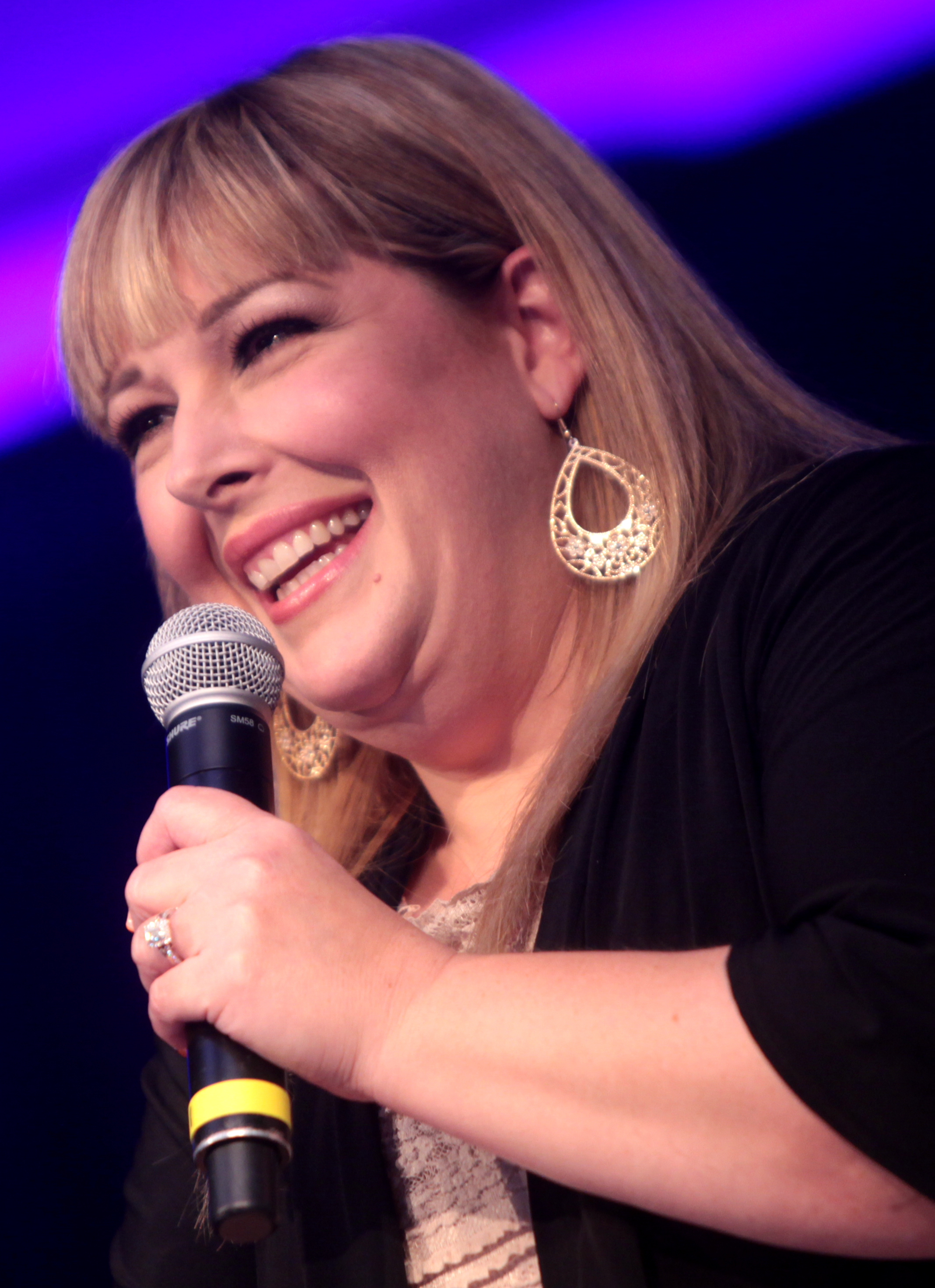
Carnie Wilson (pictured in 2014) is featured on "Down Home Country Christmas".

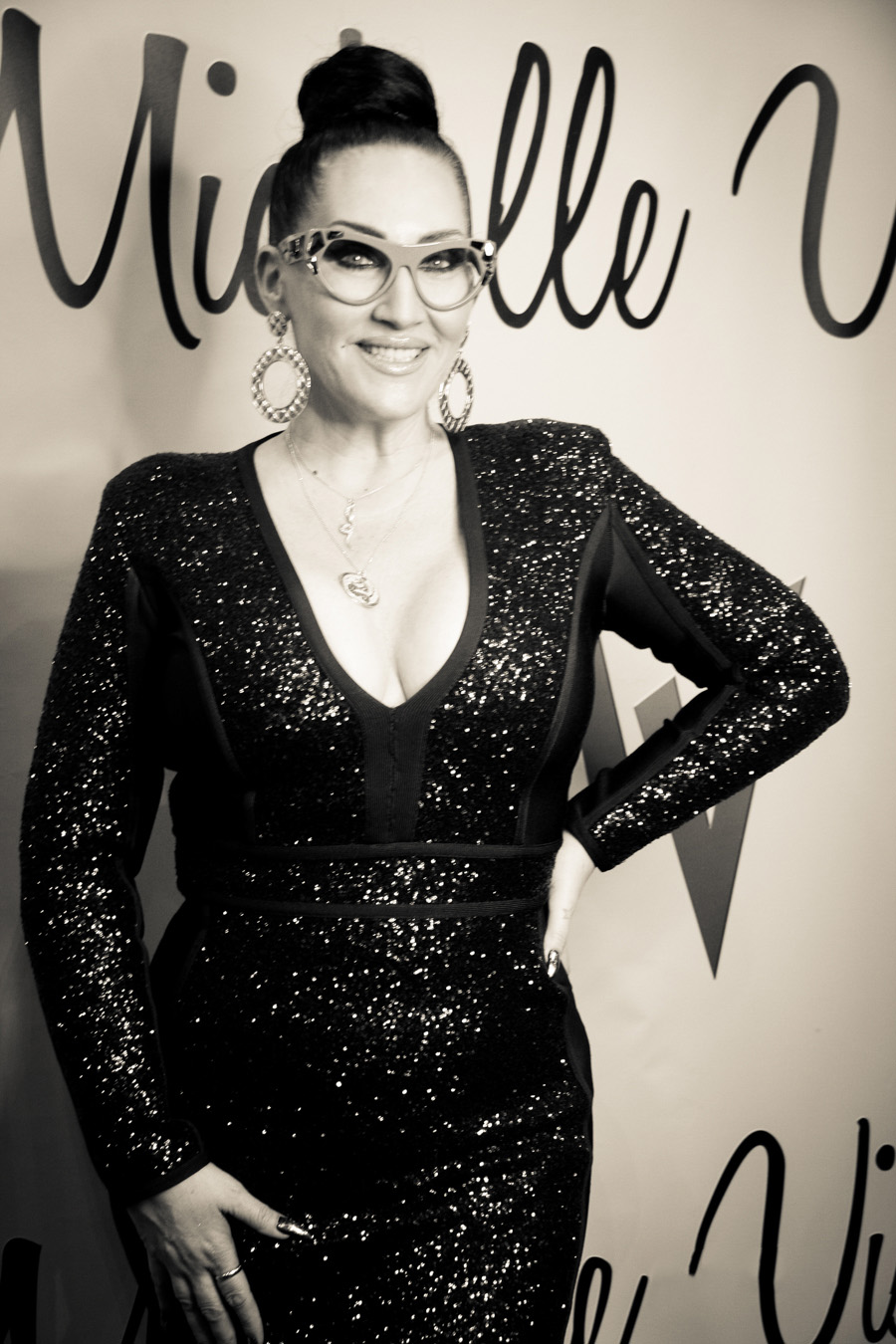
Michelle Visage (pictured in 2018) performs "O Holy Night" on the album and hosted the Christmas Queens tour.

Christmas Queens 2 is a 30-track compilation album that features various artists; these include a number of RuPaul's Drag Race contestants who perform collectively as the "Christmas Queens" as well as Jackie Beat, Michelle Visage, and Carnie Wilson. The album consists mostly of original parody material, "tailored to the personalities and styles of the various queens", according to Sean Maunier of Metro Weekly. It also contains two ensemble covers: one of the Christmas carol "Deck the Halls" and one of "Auld Lang Syne", Robert Burns' 1788 poem set to the tune of a traditional folk song. Also featured is Visage's rendition of "O Holy Night", a Christmas carol composed by Adolphe Adam in 1847 from the French poem "Minuit, chrétiens" ("Midnight, Christians") by Placide Cappeau.

Alaska Thunderfuck, known mononymously as Alaska, performs "Chr!$Tm@$ $Ux". Jinkx Monsoon's "Passive Aggressive Christmas" features Major Scales. Katya performs "Merry Christmas, It's Whateva" as her alter ego, Trish. Jiggly Caliente's "Xmas Hams" features Ginger Minj. Phi Phi O'Hara performs "Fireside". Ginger Minj's "Down Home Country Christmas" features Wilson.

BenDeLaCreme's "The Nativity Twist" is followed by Jackie Beat and Katya's "Bossa Nova Christmas in Outer Space" on Christmas Queens 2. Detox's "Homemade for the Holidays" precedes Sharon Needles' "Snow Machine", which was described by Billboard's Joe Lynch as a "tribute to the coke-fueled disco days of Studio 54". "Working Holiday" is performed by Manila Luzon and Alaska. Visage's "O Holy Night", which features Thorgy Thor on violin, is followed by Ivy Winters performing "Elfy Winters Night". Interludes are spread throughout the album, which runs for approximately one hour and ends with "Auld Lang Syne".

== Release and promotion ==
Christmas Queens 2 was released by Producer Entertainment Group on November 11, 2016. It is the second compilation in the Christmas Queens series, following Christmas Queens (2015) and preceding Christmas Queens 3 (2017).

The music video for "Working Holiday" debuted through Billboard on November 25, 2016. According to Lynch, a "drag queen Christmas tale unfolds" as Alaska plays a "disgruntled" elf from the South Pole who "grumbles about Santa's less-than-generous overtime policy" and Manila Luzon portrays "one of Santa's most exuberant" elves from the North Pole who "gushes about making families happy". Out's Glenn Garner said of the video, "Alaska appears to be channeling some Divine with that hoarse voice and some Wicked Witch of the West with that nose. She also serves some Grinch over having to work during the holidays." A web series, titled Christmas Queens, was announced in early November 2016; the first episode had making-of footage with Alaska and "Chr!$Tm@$ $Ux" co-writer Ashley Levy.

=== Tour and live performances ===
Alaska, Detox, Ginger Minj, Jiggly Caliente, Katya, Manila Luzon, Sharon Needles, Thorgy Thor, and Visage performed on the album's holiday-themed tour called Christmas Queens, which was also hosted by Visage. The tour started in the United Kingdom, with performances at Glasgow's O2 Academy, the Manchester Academy in Manchester, East London's Troxy Theater, Birmingham's O2 Institute, and Cardiff's Tramshed from December 3–8, 2016. Shows for the tour were later held in Canada and the United States at Toronto's Danforth Music Hall; New York City's PlayStation Theater; Ironwood Hall in Austin, Texas; Chicago's Vic Theatre; and The Novo in Los Angeles from December 10–17.

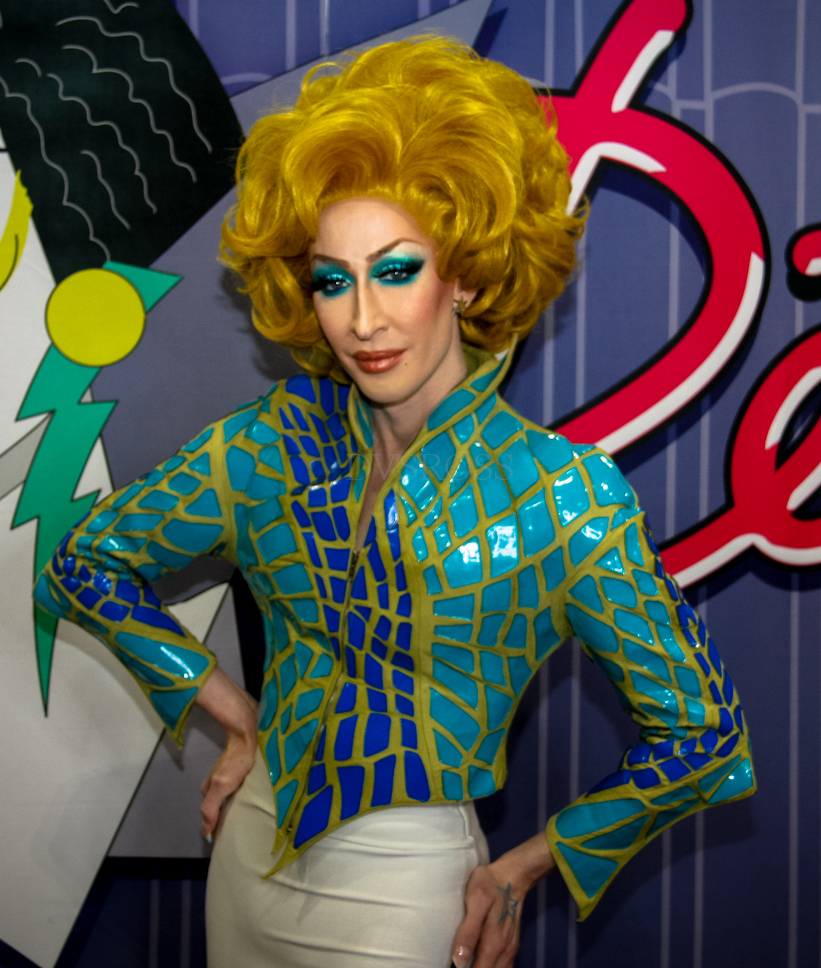
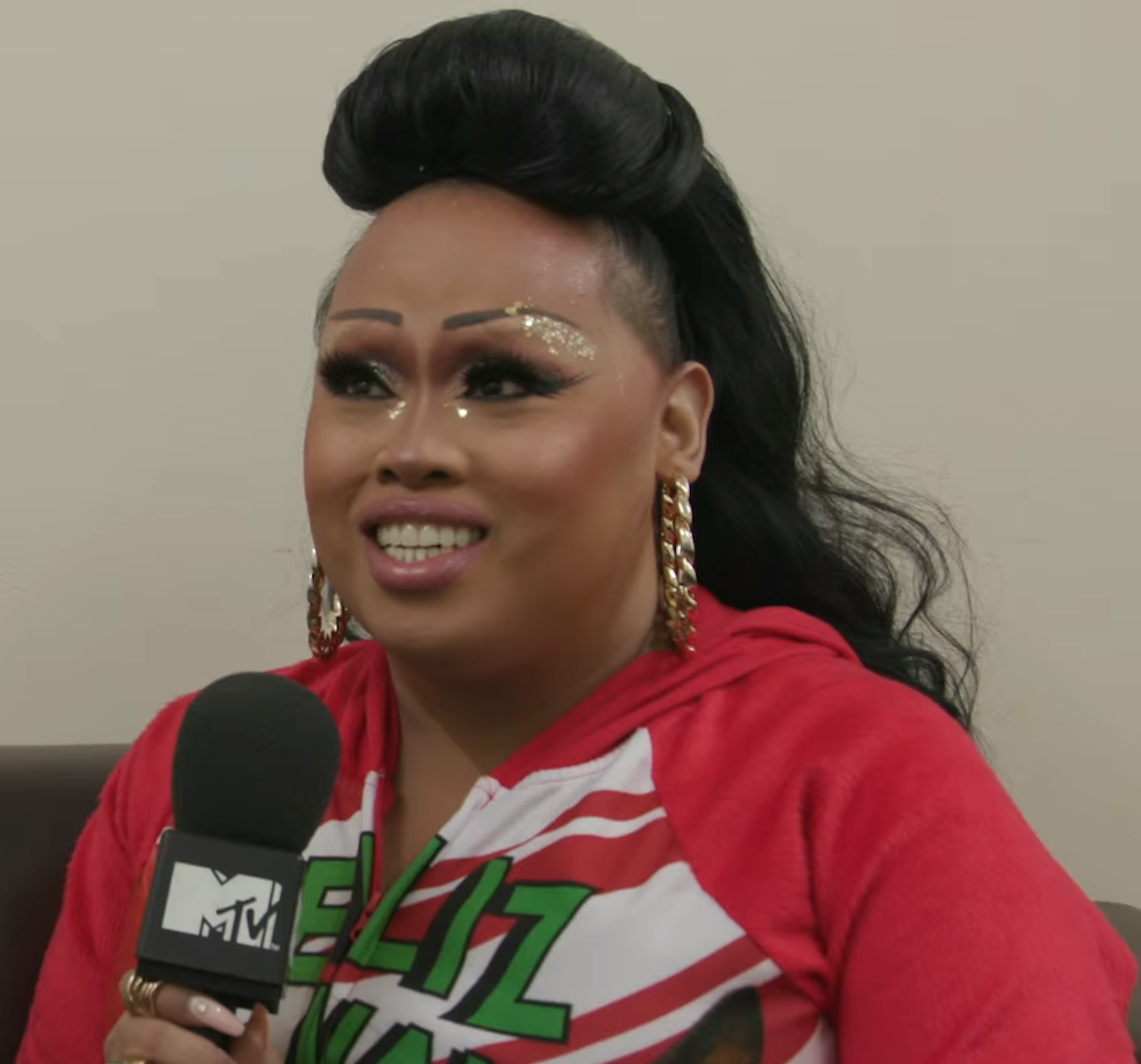
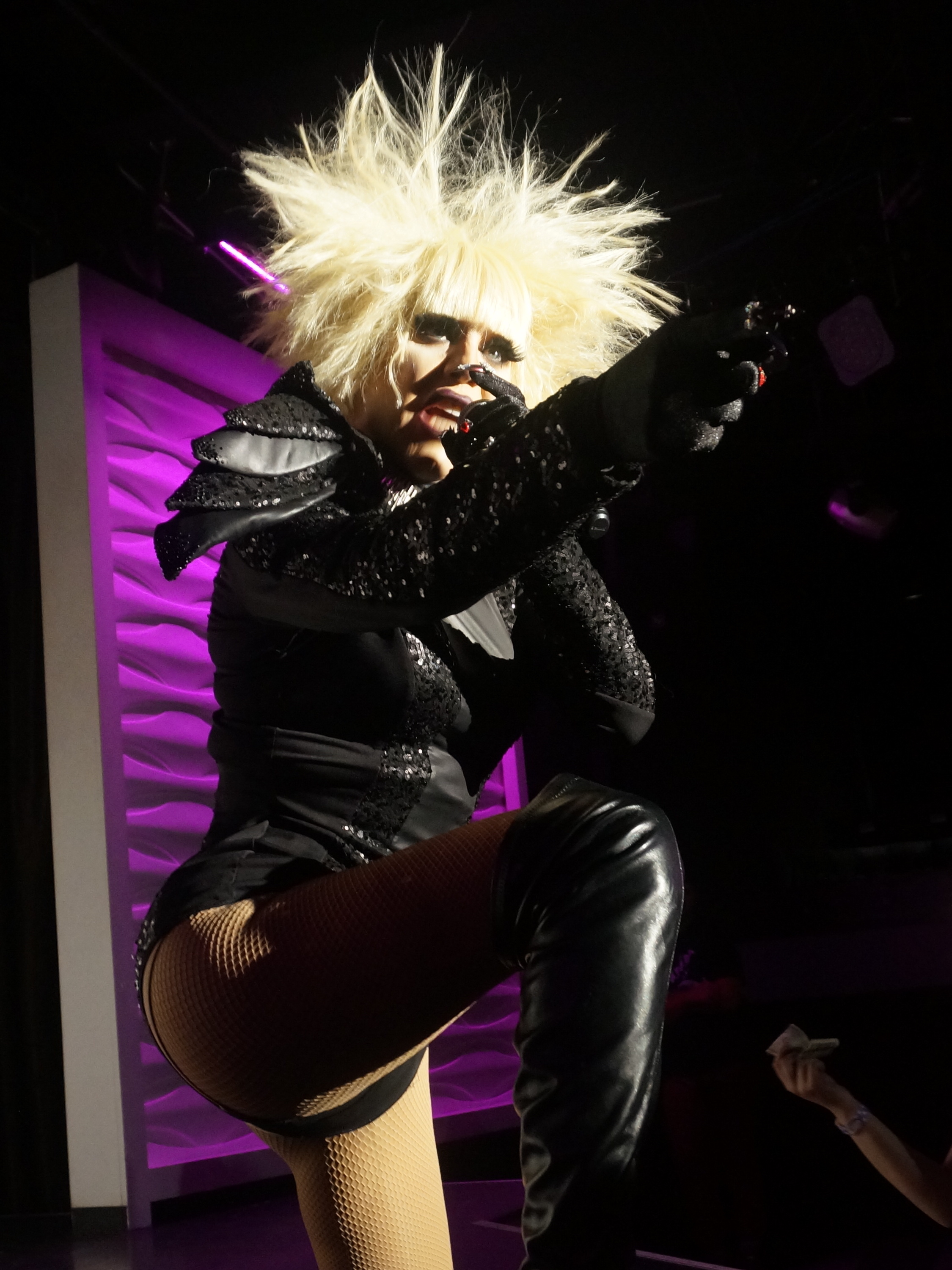
RuPaul's Drag Race contestants Detox (left), Jiggly Caliente (center), and Sharon Needles (right) each performed a track on the compilation album.

The New York show featured four "impressive, stylistically fluid" dancers according to Lynch, who also analyzed Sharon Needles' performances of "Snow Machine" and "Jingle Bells" from the original Christmas Queens compilation, opining, "Needles turned the merry classic into a hellacious heathen rallying cry that would have Ms. Claus clutching her pearls in horror and Johnny Rotten clapping." Ginger Minj and Manila Luzon competed in a lip sync battle to Mariah Carey's "All I Want for Christmas Is You" (1994), during which both stripped down to their "seasonal skivvies". Lynch said, "Minj won based on the audience applause, but by our reckoning, it was an equally matched Mariah lip sync that we'd happily watch over and over alongside A Charlie Brown Christmas." He also complimented Detox's outfits, which included a red sequined dress that he said "floated effortlessly like one of those dancing flowers in Fantasia" and assless chaps which he called "pure XXXmas delight".

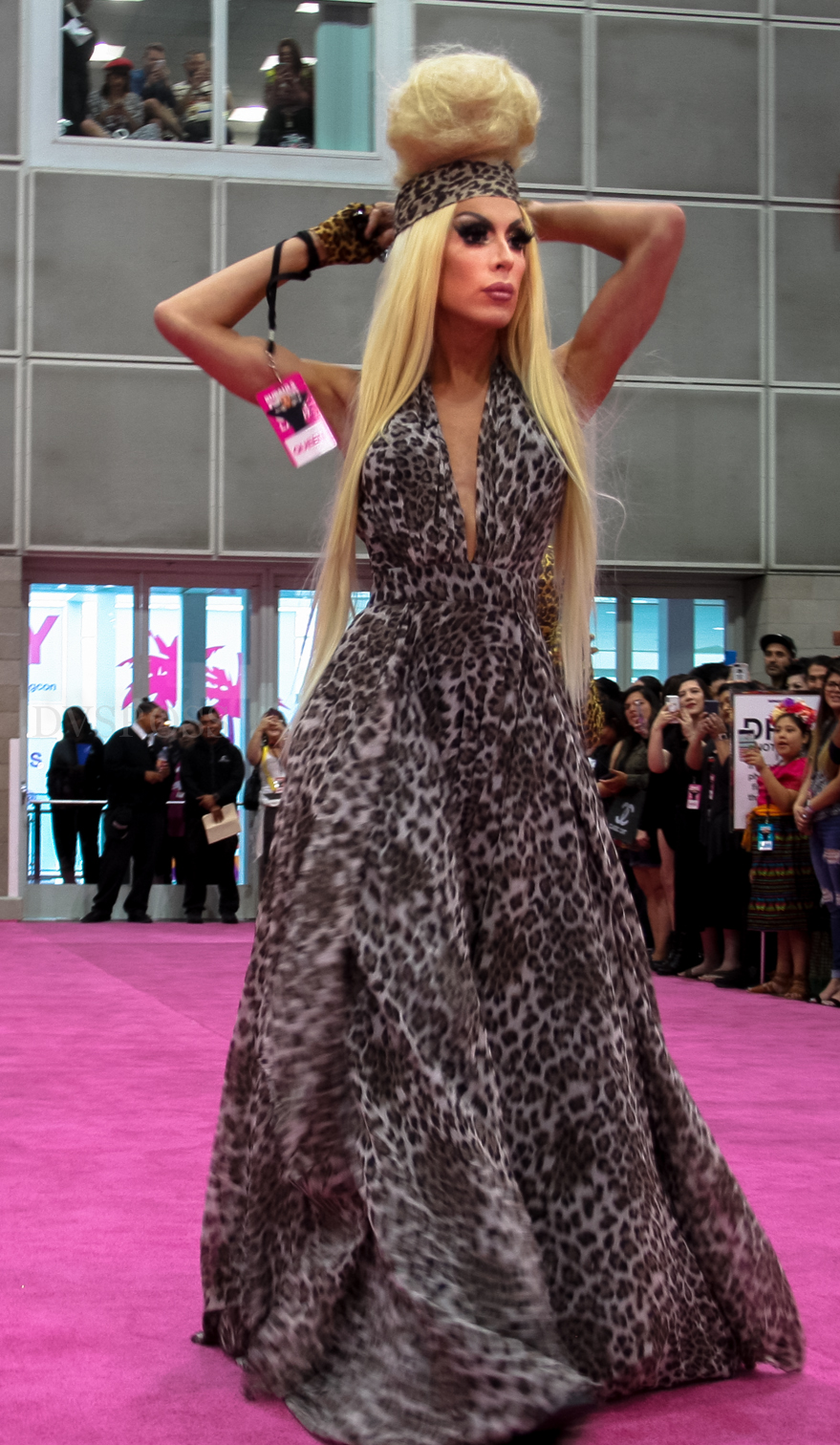
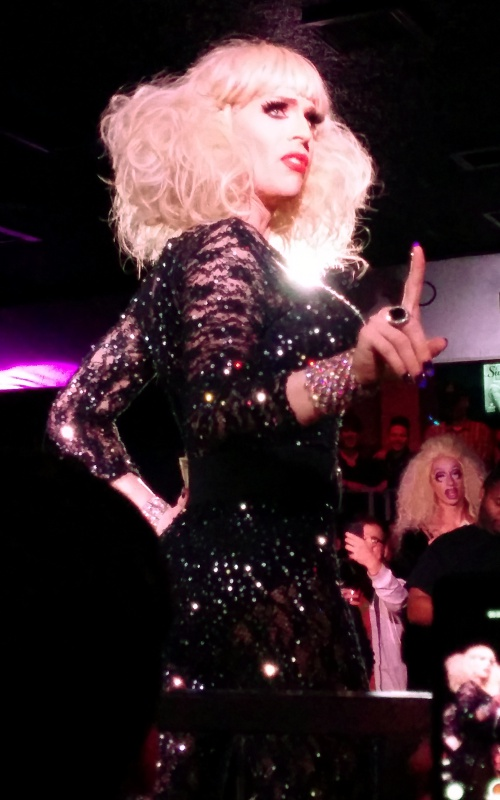
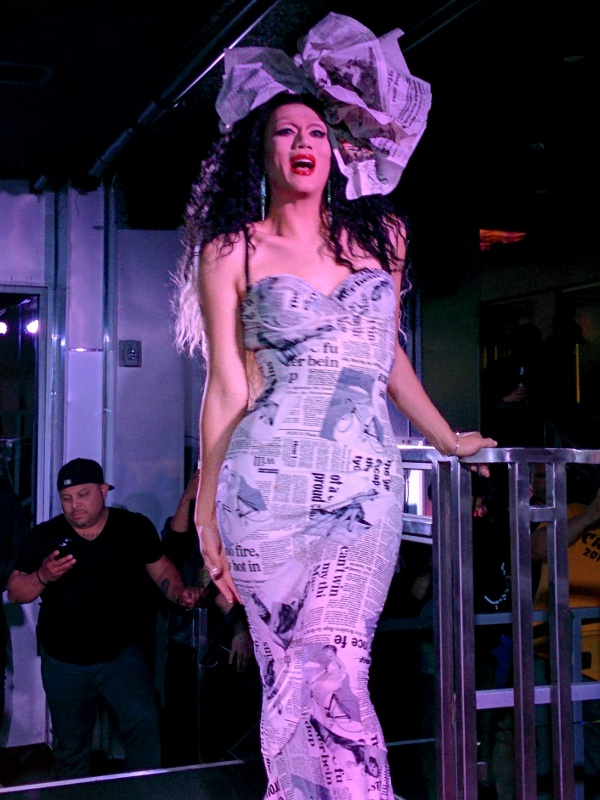
RuPaul's Drag Race contestants Alaska Thunderfuck (left), Katya (center), and Manila Luzon (right) performed on the album and tour.

Katya performed "Merry Christmas, It's Whateva" as her "trashy" alter ego Trish (described as "a recovering drug addict who still smokes pot") as well as her "hysterical, marathon" rendition of "The Twelve Days of Christmas". Lynch called her New York performance "perfect". He also praised Visage for her "joke-free" rendition of "O Holy Night" and her "inspiring words about the need for the LGBT community to spread love and kindness as we move into Trump's America". He wrote that "she absolutely stunned the crowd with the purity of her voice—no small feat, given that this was an audience otherwise primed for kitschy outfits and dick jokes. Adding a layer of seasonal sweetness was Thorgy Thor backing Michelle on violin, keeping the music elegant and minimal while her voice soared."

Jinkx Monsoon performed her songs from the first two Christmas Queens albums for Jinkx Monsoon and Major Scales: Unwrapped, which played at London's Soho Theatre during November and December 2016. Alaska, Ginger Minj, Phi Phi O'Hara, Sharon Needles, and Willam performed at A Royal Holiday, an event in Los Angeles that was also streamed online and raised funds for the Human Rights Campaign.

== Reception ==
Lynch wrote of Christmas Queens 2, "Of all the songs on an album of dirty, joke-laden seasonal offerings, [Visage's] might be the most shocking: It's a (gasp) reverent rendition of a religious Christmas classic." In his list of the "hottest (and coldest) holiday albums of 2016", Entertainment Weekly's Eric Renner Brown gave a B rating to the compilation, which he said is "as wild and packed with hilarity as its 2015 predecessor". Brown wrote, "The beats don't always work out—cuts like Jiggly Caliente's 'Xmas Hams' and Alaska Thunderf—'s 'Chr!$Tm@$ $Ux' have little replay value—but side-splitting skits and synth jams like Sharon Needles' 'Snow Machine' redeem the set."

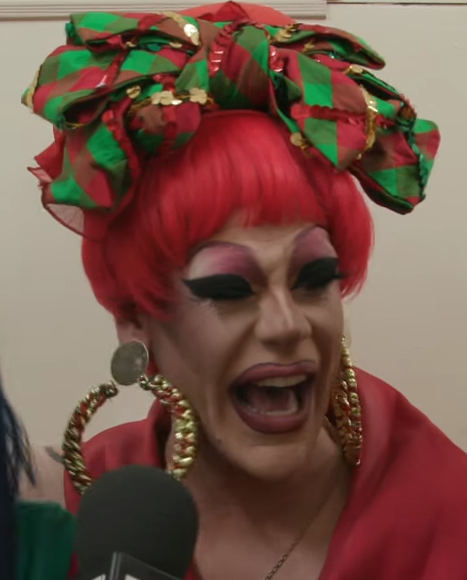
Thorgy Thor (pictured in 2018) backed Michelle Visage on violin on "O Holy Night", both on the album and on tour.

Maunier called the compilation "an hour-long celebration of camped up holiday cheer" and a "sprawling, indulgent, and incredibly campy ode" to Drag Race, with many references to the show's "iconic" moments and in-jokes. He opined, "While Drag Race alumni have become somewhat infamous for putting out albums that might have been better off not seeing the light of day, Christmas Queens 2 reminds us that when a group of talented queens comes together with veteran producers (and World of Wonder's budget), the results can be magical... It's enough to be exhausting, but might also be exactly what's needed to get us through the off-season."

Renowned for Sound's Michael Smith called the album "much less exciting than the first volume despite its increased scope", noting that some songs "feel awkward rather than creative". He found a number of the interludes "entertaining" but unnecessary and unsubstantial. Smith complimented tracks by Phi Phi O'Hara and Sharon Needles, and he said that Visage and Thorgy Thor "smash it out of the park with a faithful, powerful" rendition. He thought Jackie Beat and Katya "mixe[d] humour and quality the best, melding with the personalities of both queens perfectly", further stating that their duet stood out from the other carols and dance tracks. He commended Alaska for "capturing the apathy of modern Christmases perfectly while working in her own funny attitude", before summarizing his feelings as follows: "Christmas Queens 2 is an overwrought, overthought package... Die hard Drag Race fans will surely enjoy seeing their favourites come back again, but for the most part Christmas Queens 2 is still a follow-up that loses the spark that made the first one so interesting."

Christmas Queens 2 reached a peak position of number two on Billboard's Comedy Albums chart, matching the debut and peak of its prequel.

== Track listing ==
No.	Title	Artist	Length
1.	"'Twas the Night (Interlude)"	Christmas Queens	2:02
2.	"Deck the Halls"	Christmas Queens	1:39
3.	"Christmas Stories (Interlude)"	Christmas Queens	1:30
4.	"Chr!$Tm@$ $Ux"	Alaska Thunderfuck	3:04
5.	"A Hanukkah Moment (Interlude)"	Christmas Queens	1:41
6.	"Passive Aggressive Christmas" (feat. Major Scales)	Jinkx Monsoon	4:06
7.	"Katya's Smelly Friend (Interlude)"	Christmas Queens	0:33
8.	"Merry Christmas, It's Whateva"	Trish	2:39
9.	"Hangry Queens (Interlude)"	Christmas Queens	0:37
10.	"Xmas Hams" (feat. Ginger Minj)	Jiggly Caliente	2:37
11.	"Food Coma (Interlude)"	Christmas Queens	0:29
12.	"Fireside"	Phi Phi O'Hara	3:07
13.	"Not-So-Secret Santa (Interlude)"	Christmas Queens	1:11
14.	"Down Home Country Christmas" (feat. Carnie Wilson)	Ginger Minj	2:59
15.	"Pandora Boxx's Gingerbread Person (Interlude)"	Christmas Queens	0:50
16.	"The Nativity Twist"	BenDeLaCreme	2:23
17.	"This Party Blows (Interlude)"	Christmas Queens	0:52
18.	"Bossa Nova Christmas in Outer Space"	Jackie Beat, Katya	3:01
19.	"Mother Lovin Rotary Call (Interlude)"	Christmas Queens	0:43
20.	"Homemade for the Holidays" (feat. Mamatox)	Detox	3:04
21.	"Tardy for the Party (Interlude)"	Christmas Queens	0:46
22.	"Snow Machine"	Sharon Needles	3:09
23.	"Darienne Lake vs. Egg Nog (Interlude)"	Christmas Queens	3:32
24.	"Working Holiday"	Manila Luzon, Alaska Thunderfuck	3:04
25.	"Blackout Fantasy (Interlude)"	Christmas Queens	0:48
26.	"O Holy Night" (feat. Thorgy Thor)	Michelle Visage	3:50
27.	"Let There Be Light! (Interlude)"	Christmas Queens	0:43
28.	"Elfy Winters Night"	Ivy Winters	3:33
29.	"Miss Fame Serving Santa (Interlude)"	Christmas Queens	0:48
30.	"Auld Lang Syne"	Christmas Queens	1:37
Total length:			58:54

Track listing adapted from the Apple Store.

== Charts ==
Chart performance for Christmas Queens 2
Chart (2016)	Peak position
US Comedy Albums (Billboard)	2
