= Christmas Queens 3 =

Compilation album by various artists
- Released: November 17, 2017
- Recorded: 2017
- Genres: Christmas, pop, comedy
- Length: 1:07:03
- Label: Producer Entertainment Group

Various artists chronology
Christmas Queens 2 (2016)	Christmas Queens 3 (2017)	Christmas Queens 4 (2018)

Christmas Queens 3 is a holiday compilation album, released in 2017. The album is the third installation in a similarly-named series, following Christmas Queens and Christmas Queens 2, and features Alaska Thunderfuck, Bob the Drag Queen, Peppermint, Phi Phi O'Hara, and Sharon Needles, among others.

== Track listing ==
No.	Title	Artist	Length
1.	"Sandra Claus"	Bob the Drag Queen	1:14
2.	"Christmas Waltz"	Miss Fame	2:17
3.	"Interlude 1"	Christmas Queens	0:59
4.	"The Murder of the Lawson Family"	Sharon Needles	2:52
5.	"Interlude 2"	Christmas Queens	1:36
6.	"White Christmas"	Ginger Minj	1:49
7.	"Interlude 3"	Christmas Queens	1:45
8.	"Christmas Luvin'"	Jiggly Caliente	2:17
9.	"Interlude 4"	Christmas Queens	2:30
10.	"Angels We Have Heard on High"	Alaska Thunderfuck	3:43
11.	"Interlude 5"	Christmas Queens	1:57
12.	"O Come, All Ye Faithful"	Phi Phi O'Hara	2:44
13.	"Interlude 6"	Christmas Queens	0:51
14.	"We Three Queens (feat. Alaska Thunderfuck & Peppermint)"	Manila Luzon	3:38
15.	"Interlude 7"	Christmas Queens	0:51
16.	"The First Noel"	Ivy Winters	1:47
17.	"Interlude 8"	Christmas Queens	1:24
18.	"Hanukkah, Oh Hanukkah"	Jinkx Monsoon & Sherry Vine	2:59
19.	"Interlude 9"	Christmas Queens	1:19
20.	"Dreidel, Dreidel, Dreidel"	Jackie Beat & Katya	1:37
21.	"Interlude 10"	Christmas Queens	1:04
22.	"God Rest Ye Merry, Gentlemen"	Thorgy Thor	2:40
23.	"Interlude 11"	Christmas Queens	0:40
24.	"What Child Is This (feat. Thorgy Thor)"	Peppermint	3:49
25.	"Interlude 12"	Christmas Queens	1:09
26.	"Let It Snow"	Christmas Queens	1:48
27.	"Interlude 13"	Christmas Queens	0:40
28.	"Happy Holidays"	Ivy Winters	2:12
29.	"Interlude 14"	Christmas Queens	0:56
30.	"The Auld Lang Syne Song"	Jinkx Monsoon	3:29
31.	"Interlude 15"	Christmas Queens	1:31
32.	"Joy to the World"	Christmas Queens	2:16
33.	"Interlude 16"	Christmas Queens	1:28
34.	"Silent Night"	Michelle Visage & Thorgy Thor	3:12
Total length:			1:07:03

Track listing adapted from the iTunes Store.
