= Christmas Queens =

Compilation album by various artists
- Released: November 13, 2015
- Recorded: 2015
- Genre: Christmas, pop
- Length: 48:01
- Label: Producer Entertainment Group

Various artists chronology
Christmas Queens (2015)	Christmas Queens 2 (2016)

Christmas Queens is a Christmas album featuring classic covers and original songs by several of the contestants and fan favorites from the TV series RuPaul's Drag Race. The album was released on November 13, 2015.

The sequel album, Christmas Queens 2, was released in 2016, followed by Christmas Queens 3 in 2017 and Christmas Queens 4 in 2018.

== Promotion ==
In support of this release, the artists embarked on The Christmas Queens Tour, which featured them performing tracks from the album. Also, music videos were released for many of the album tracks, including Alaska Thunderfuck's "Everyday Is Christmas," Detox Icunt's "This Is How We Jew It" and Jiggly Caliente's "Ratchet Christmas."

=== Tour dates ===
United States
Date	City	Country	Venue	Host	Performers
December 21, 2015	Chicago	United States	Park West	Willam	Alaska Thunderfuck; Ginger Minj; Jinkx Monsoon; Katya; Sharon Needles; Willam
December 22, 2015	Minneapolis	United States	Pantages Theatre	Willam	Alaska Thunderfuck; Ginger Minj; Jinkx Monsoon; Katya; Sharon Needles; Willam
December 23, 2015	Detroit	United States	Andiamo Celebrity Showroom	Willam	Alaska Thunderfuck; Ginger Minj; Jinkx Monsoon; Katya; Sharon Needles; Willam
December 27, 2015	Phoenix	United States	Orpheum Theatre	Willam	Alaska Thunderfuck; Ginger Minj; Jinkx Monsoon; Katya; Sharon Needles; Willam
December 28, 2015	Denver	United States	Paramount Theatre	Willam	Alaska Thunderfuck; Ginger Minj; Jinkx Monsoon; Katya; Sharon Needles; Willam

== Chart performance ==
In the US, the album debuted and peaked at number 2 on the Billboard Comedy Albums chart.

== Track listing ==
No.	Title	Artist	Length
1.	"We Wish You a Merry Christmas"	Christmas Queens	2:32
2.	"Everyday Is Christmas"	Alaska Thunderfuck 5000	3:25
3.	"Christma-Hannu-Kwanzaa-Ka"	Ginger Minj	3:33
4.	"Toyland"	Miss Fame	1:50
5.	"Jingle Bells"	Sharon Needles	2:48
6.	"12 Days of Christmas"	Katya Zamolodchikova	3:49
7.	"From Head to Mistletoe"	Courtney Act	3:04
8.	"Ratchet Christmas"	Jiggly Caliente	2:41
9.	"This Is How We Jew It"	Detox Icunt	3:00
10.	"Christmas Sweater"	Alaska Thunderfuck 5000, Courtney Act and Willam Belli	3:29
11.	"A Very Cozby Christmas"	Willam Belli	2:29
12.	"Christmas Is Coming You Wh**e"	Darienne Lake, Ivy Winters and Pandora Boxx	2:51
13.	"The Night Before Christmas"	Violet Chachki	1:54
14.	"Naughty or Nice"	Phi Phi O'Hara	3:30
15.	"Red & Green"	Jinkx Monsoon	3:17
16.	"Slay Bells"	Manila Luzon	3:49
Total length:			48:01

== Charts ==
Chart (2015)	Peak position
US Top Comedy Albums	2
