= Christmas Queens 4 =

Compilation album by various artists
- Released: November 16, 2018
- Recorded: 2018
- Genre: Christmas
- Length: 29:49
- Label: Producer Entertainment Group

Various artists chronology
Christmas Queens 3 (2017)	Christmas Queens 4 (2018)

Christmas Queens 4 is a holiday compilation album featuring covers of Christmas songs by contestants of the American reality competition television series RuPaul's Drag Race. The album was released by the label Producer Entertainment Group on November 16, 2018. It is the fourth installment of the Christmas Queens album series.

== Composition ==
The album opens with Jinkx Monsoon performing a "jazzy" rendition of "Jingle Bell Rock" (1957) by Bobby Helms. Jinkx Monsoon contributed to all four Christmas Queens albums.

Blair St. Clair performs an "EDM-infused" cover of "Last Christmas" (1984) by Wham!, and BeBe Zahara Benet performs a "dragged-up" remix of "Little Drummer Boy", written by Katherine Kennicott Davis in 1941. Manila Luzon covers "It's the Most Wonderful Time of the Year" (1963), written by Edward Pola and George Wyle. Alaska Thunderfuck follows with a "campy" rendition of "Santa Baby", originally released in 1953 by Eartha Kitt with Henri René and His Orchestra.

Eureka O'Hara performs the novelty song "Grandma Got Run Over by a Reindeer" (1979). Kameron Michaels sings "Let It Snow", written by lyricist Sammy Cahn and composer Jule Styne in 1945. Asia O'Hara follows with a rendition of "'Cause I'm Rich". Jujubee performs "Santa Claus Is Coming to Town" (1934), written by J. Fred Coots and Haven Gillespie. The song marked her first and only solo recording, until the release of her debut extended play (EP) Good Juju: Vol 1 in 2020.

Sharon Needles follows with "Brothers in Our World". The album closes with Ginger Minj's "Have Yourself a Merry Little Christmas", written by Hugh Martin and Ralph Blane and introduced by Judy Garland in the 1944 MGM musical Meet Me in St. Louis.

== Promotion ==
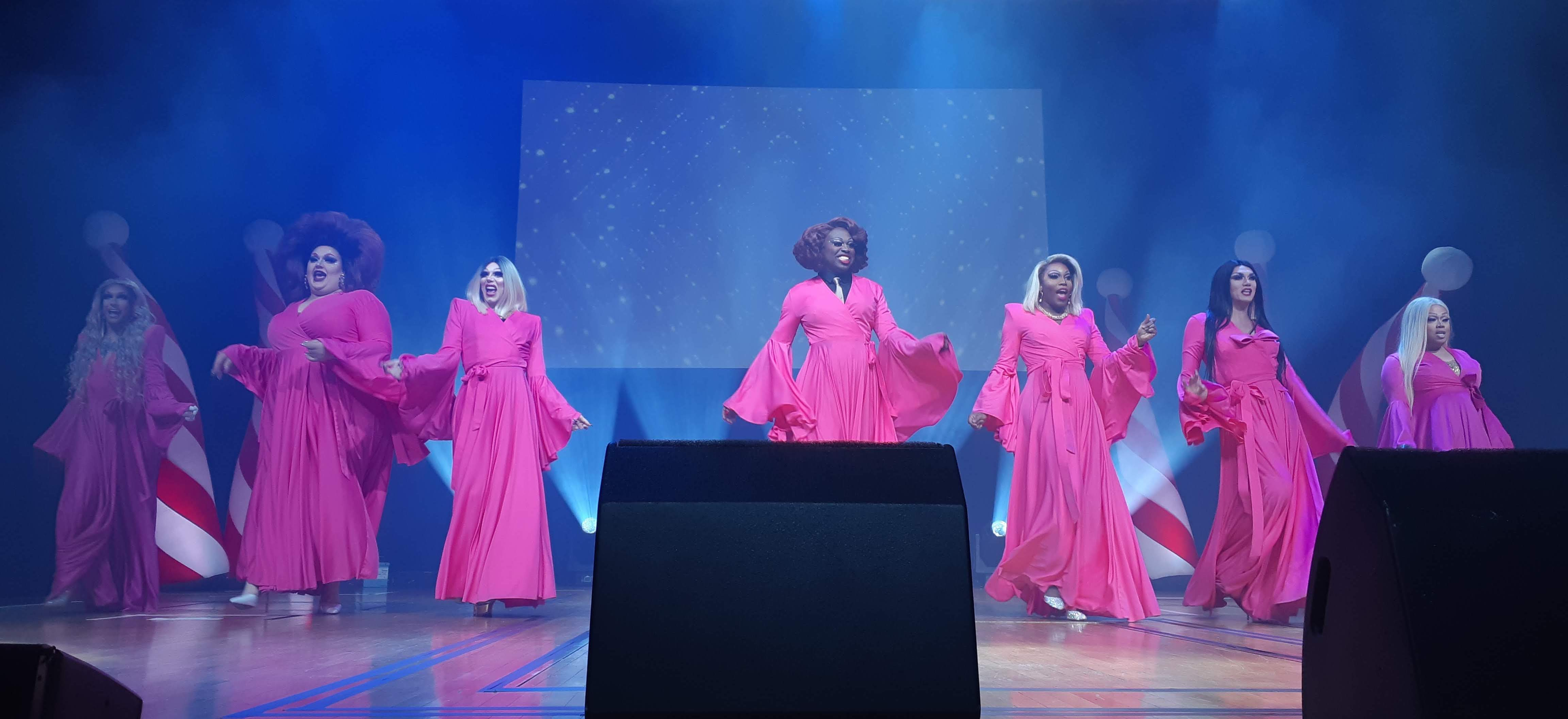
Kameron Michaels, Eureka O'Hara, Sharon Needles, Bob the Drag Queen, Asia O'Hara, Manila Luzon and Jiggly Caliente performing at Finlandia Hall in Helsinki on December 21, 2018, as part of the Christmas Queens tour

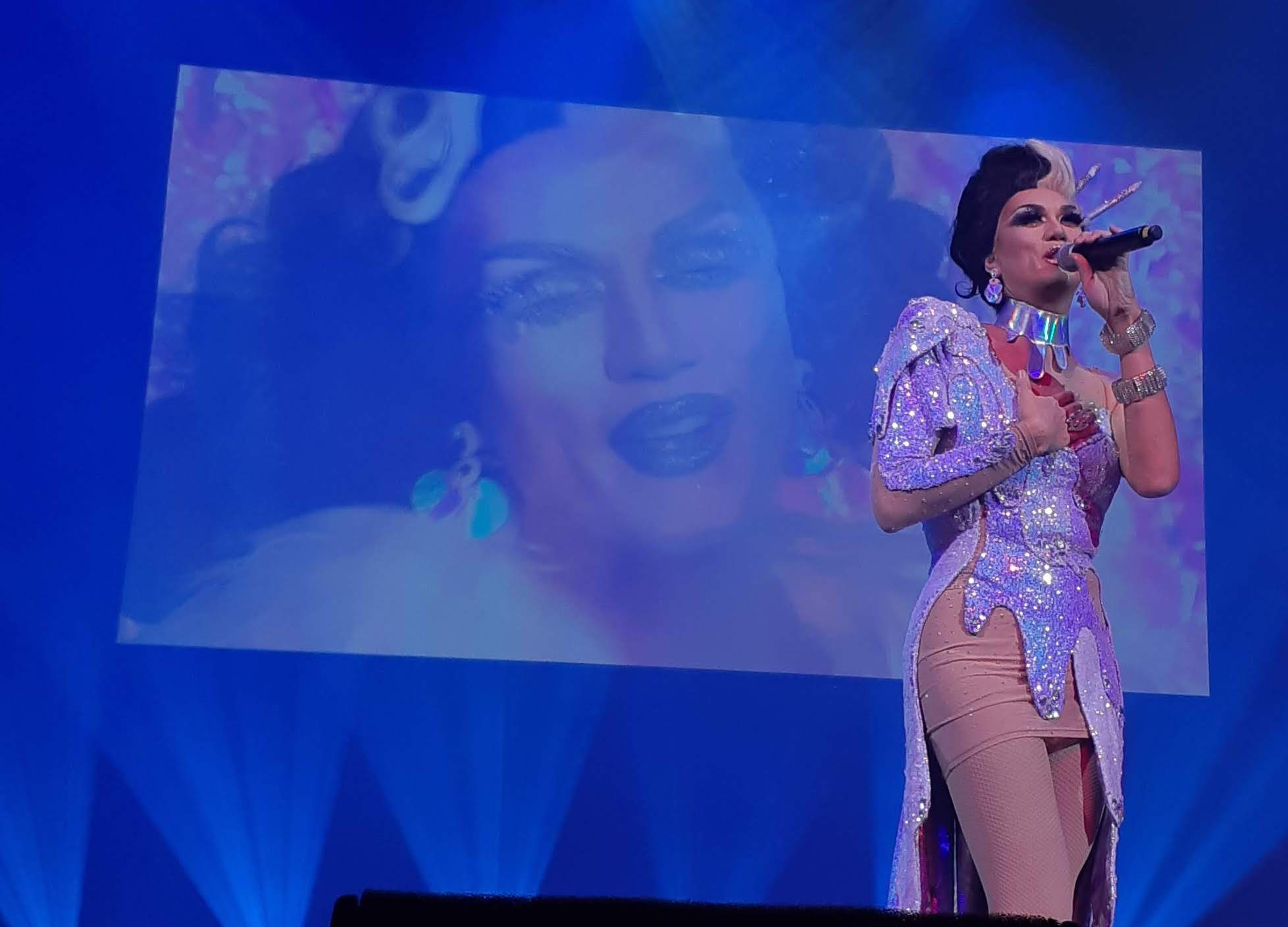
Manila Luzon performing on the Christmas Queens tour; her cover of "It's the Most Wonderful Time of the Year" (1963) received a music video.

"It's the Most Wonderful Time of the Year" received a music video. According to Stephen Daw of Billboard, in the video Manila Luzon "prances around her expertly-decorated set, making herself and models over for the holiday season". The album's first five tracks were made available on Billboard's website on November 12, 2018. In November and December, five of the album's artists—Sharon Needles, Manila Luzon, Kameron Michaels, Eureka O'Hara and Asia O'Hara—embarked on a Christmas Queens tour in Europe, together with Bob the Drag Queen and Jiggly Caliente, performing some of the album's songs. The tour was produced by Voss Events and Producer Entertainment Group, and saw stops in the United Kingdom (UK), Ireland, the Netherlands, Denmark, Norway, Sweden, and Finland, between November 29 and December 22, 2018. Following is a full list of dates and venues:

- November 29: Birmingham, UK – Symphony Hall
- November 30: Sunderland, UK – Sunderland Empire Theatre
- December 1: Glasgow, UK – SEC Armadillo
- December 2: Liverpool, UK – Liverpool Empire Theatre
- December 3: Brighton, UK – Brighton Dome
- December 6: Belfast, UK – Waterfront Hall
- December 8: London, UK – Troxy
- December 9: Manchester, UK – O2 Apollo
- December 10: Dublin, Ireland – Bord Gáis Theatre
- December 11: Bristol, UK – O2 Academy Bristol
- December 13: Amsterdam – Theater Amsterdam
- December 16: Copenhagen, Denmark – Vega
- December 18: Oslo, Norway – Folketeateret
- December 19: Stockholm, Sweden – Göta Lejon
- December 21: Helsinki, Finland – Finlandia Hall
- December 22: Helsinki, Finland – Finlandia Hall

== Reception ==
Queerty's David Grant wrote, "No shade to Bing Crosby, but after hearing BeBe Zahara Benet's new cover of 'Little Drummer Boy', it’s safe to say this Christmas classic has reached its apex." Grant said her performance "gives the otherwise-sleepy song the musical equivalent of a few 5-hour energy shots". In 2019, Chris Malone included "Last Christmas" in Billboard's overview of eleven "of our favorite Christmas tunes from some of our favorite drag queens". Ethan Moser of Gay Community News included "Last Christmas" in a 2023 list of 25 "amazing Drag Race Christmas songs to make the Yuletide gay". Ginger Minj has said BeBe Zahara Benet's version of "Little Drummer Boy" is her favorite rendition of the song.

== Track listing ==
No.	Title	Artist	Length
1.	"Jingle Bell Rock"	Jinkx Monsoon	2:14
2.	"Last Christmas"	Blair St. Clair	3:40
3.	"Little Drummer Boy"	BeBe Zahara Benet	3:05
4.	"It's the Most Wonderful Time of the Year"	Manila Luzon	3:05
5.	"Santa Baby"	Alaska Thunderfuck	3:03
6.	"Grandma Got Run Over by a Reindeer"	Eureka O'Hara	3:01
7.	"Let It Snow"	Kameron Michaels	2:29
8.	"'Cause I'm Rich"	Asia O'Hara	2:25
9.	"Santa Claus Is Coming to Town"	Jujubee	2:10
10.	"Brothers in Our World"	Sharon Needles	2:20
11.	"Have Yourself a Merry Little Christmas"	Ginger Minj	2:17
Total length:			29:49
