= Ivy Winters =

American drag performer

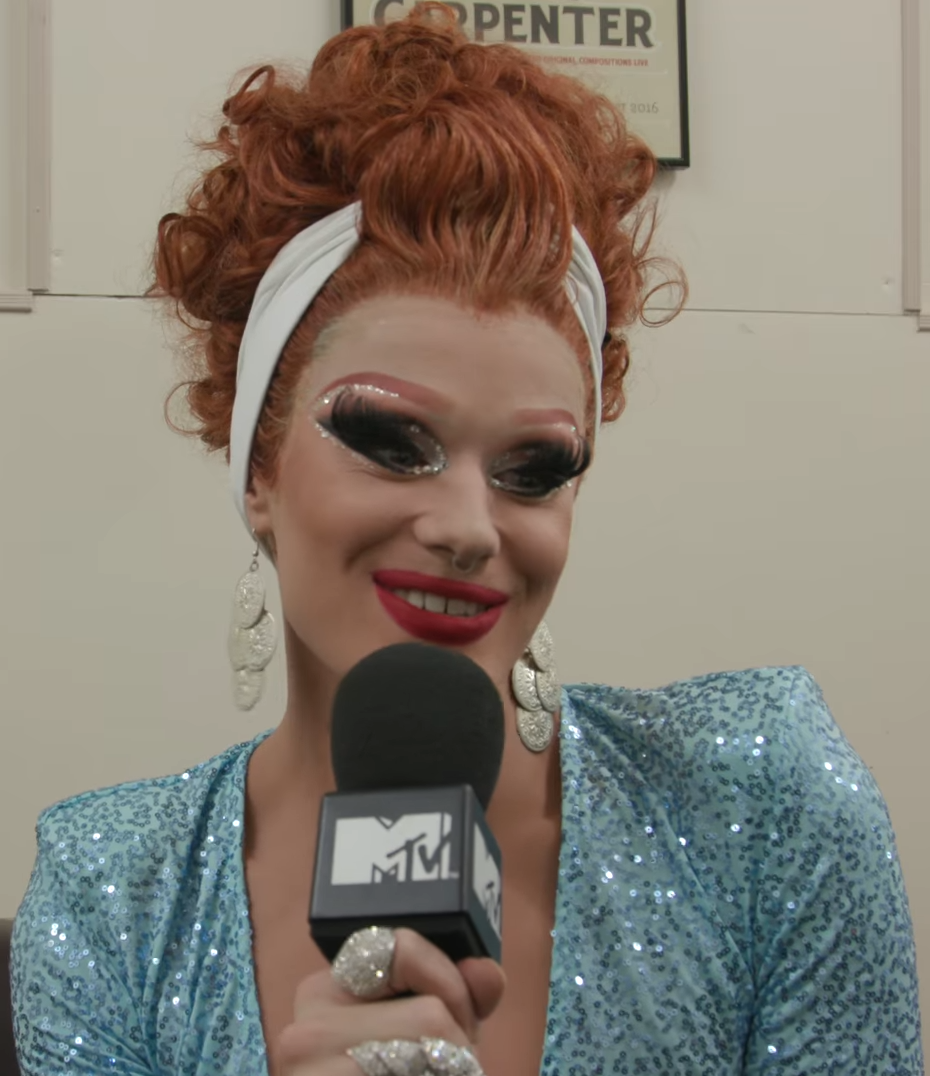
- Winters in 2018
- Born: Dustin Winters; October 5, 1986 (age 40); Greenville, Michigan, U.S.
- Occupations: Drag performer, Singer, Actor
- Years active: 2004–present
- Known for: RuPaul's Drag Race (season 5)
- Title: Miss Congeniality
- Predecessor: Latrice Royale
- Successor: BenDeLaCreme
- Spouse: Keith Book (m. 2015)

Ivy Winters (born October 5, 1986) is the stage name of Dustin Winters, an American drag performer, singer and actor. She is best known for competing on the fifth season of the reality-show RuPaul's Drag Race, later winning the Miss Congeniality title.

== Biography ==
Winters was born to Tricia Winters in Greenville, Michigan, and raised in Fenwick, Michigan. Before Drag Race, Winters worked as a circus performer for eight and a half years in New York, where he learned how to juggle, walk on stilts and breathe fire. He started doing drag at 18. He was a costume designer for Lady Bunny and season three contestant Manila Luzon. He came out as gay to his parents at his freshman year of high school. His sister came out as a lesbian a year later. His brother came out the following year.

== Career ==
Winters was announced as one of the fourteen contestants for the fifth season of RuPaul's Drag Race on January 28, 2013. He was eliminated in the eighth episode, placing 7th overall. He later won the annual title of Miss Congeniality at the seasons live finale on May 1, 2013. He made an appearance on the season six live finale, presenting the following winner of Miss Congeniality, which was fifth-placing BenDeLaCreme.

After the show, Winters hosted an internet webshow called Queen Acres, a DIY arts and crafts show. Season six contestant Darienne Lake hosted with her. The first episode was uploaded to YouTube on December 24, 2017. He also made an appearance in an episode of Watch What Happens Live with Lake and Sherry Vine. He was featured in the documentary, Dragged in 2016. He was in a BuzzFeed video on April 2, 2013, discussing his experience in drag.

Winters released his first single, "Overcome" on June 22, 2016. He was featured in the first three volumes of Christmas Queens, with other Drag Race alumni. A music video for "Elfy Winters Night" on the second volume was uploaded to his YouTube channel on December 13, 2016. The video features stop-motion Claymation that he designed himself.

== Personal life ==
Winters married his husband, Keith Everett Book, on November 26, 2015.

== Filmography ==
=== Movies ===
Year	Title	Role	Notes
2016	Dragged	Herself	Documentary
2019	The Queens	Herself	Documentary

=== Television ===
Year	Title	Role	Notes
2013	RuPaul's Drag Race (season 5)	Herself	Contestant (7th place)
2013	RuPaul's Drag Race: Untucked	Herself	Contestant (7th place)
2014	RuPaul's Drag Race (season 6)	Herself	Guest - Live finale
2017	Watch What Happens Live	Herself	

=== Web series ===
Year	Title	Role
2013	BuzzFeed	Herself
2017	Queen Acres	Herself

=== Music videos ===
Year	Title	Artist	Ref.
2015	"Hieeee"	Alaska Thunderfuck	
2017	"Let It Snow"	Christmas Queens	

== Discography ==
Year	Title
2016	"Overcome"
2016	"Elfy Winters Night"

== See also ==
- LGBTQ culture in New York City
- List of LGBTQ people from New York City
