= The Queens (2019 film) =

2019 Documentary film by Adrienne Gruben

- Promotional release poster
- Directed by: Adrienne Gruben
- Produced by: David Charpentier; Adrienne Gruben; Jacob Slane
- Starring: Jinkx Monsoon; Sharon Needles; Alaska Thunderfuck; Katya Zamolodchikova
- Edited by: Benjamin Shearn
- Production company: Producer Entertainment Group
- Distributed by: OUTtv Network
- Release date: August 13, 2019
- Running time: 98 minutes
- Country: Canada
- Language: English

The Queens is a 2019 Canadian documentary film directed by Adrienne Gruben. The film centers about the queens of RuPaul's Drag Race Jinkx Monsoon, Sharon Needles, Alaska Thunderfuck and Katya Zamolodchikova.

== Cast ==
- Jinkx Monsoon
- Sharon Needles
- Alaska Thunderfuck
- Katya Zamolodchikova
- Jiggly Caliente
- Ginger Minj
- Manila Luzon
- Michelle Visage
- Jaremi Carey
- Violet Chachki
- Bob the Drag Queen
- Courtney Act
- Ivy Winters
- RuPaul
- Willam Belli
- Trixie Mattel
- Thorgy Thor
- Becca Sweitzer
- Isaiah Alexander
- Richard JMV Scheiffer
- Michael Munday
- Mike Munich

== Release ==
The film was released in Apple TV+ on August 13, 2019.
