= The Jinkx and DeLa Holiday Show =

Annual holiday show

- Concert by BenDeLaCreme and Jinkx Monsoon
- Promotional artwork, 2023

The Jinkx and DeLa Holiday Show is an annual holiday show by American drag performers BenDeLaCreme and Jinkx Monsoon.

== Tour dates ==
=== 2021 ===
Source: Entertainment Weekly

- November 13 – Liverpool, UK (Playhouse Theatre)
- November 15 – Edinburgh, UK (Queens Hall)
- November 19 – London, UK (Troxy)
- November 20 – Manchester, UK (Palace Theatre)
- November 21 – Brighton, UK (Theatre Royal)
- November 22 – Newcastle, UK (Tyne Theatre & Opera House)
- November 23 – Birmingham, UK (Town Hall)
- November 26 – Montreal, Quebec (Rialto Theatre)
- November 27 – Toronto, Ontario (Queen Elizabeth Theatre)
- November 30 – Portland, Maine (State Theatre)
- December 1 – Boston, Massachusetts (The Wilbur)
- December 3 – New York, New York (The Town Hall)
- December 4 – New York, New York (The Town Hall)
- December 5 – Washington, D.C. (Lincoln Theatre)
- December 6 – Philadelphia, Pennsylvania (Keswick Theatre, Glenside)
- December 8 – St. Paul, Minnesota (The Fitzgerald)
- December 9 – Chicago, Illinois (Thalia Hall)
- December 10 – Detroit, Michigan (The Majestic Theatre)
- December 12 – Austin, Texas (Paramount Theatre)
- December 14 – Denver, Colorado (Paramount Theatre)
- December 16 – Phoenix, Arizona (The Van Buren)
- December 18 – Los Angeles, California (The Theatre at Ace Hotel)
- December 19 – San Francisco, California (The Palace of Fine Arts Theatre)
- December 21 – Seattle, Washington (The Neptune)
- December 22 – Seattle, Washington (The Neptune)
- December 23 – Seattle, Washington (The Neptune)
- December 24 – Seattle, Washington (The Neptune)
- December 26 – Seattle, Washington (The Neptune)
- December 26 – Seattle, Washington (The Neptune)
- December 21 – Seattle, Washington (The Neptune)
- December 28 – Vancouver, British Columbia (Vogue Theatre)
- December 30 – Portland, Oregon (The Newmark)

=== 2022 ===
Source: Entertainment Weekly

- November 23 — Buffalo, New York (Riviera Theatre)
- November 25 — Toronto, Ontario (Queen Elizabeth Theatre)
- November 26 — Ottawa, Ontario (Algonquin Commons Theatre)
- November 27 — Montreal, Quebec (Olympia)
- November 29 — Boston, Massachusetts (Chevalier Theatre)
- November 30 — Philadelphia, Pennsylvania (The Fillmore)
- December 2 — New York, New York (Town Hall)
- December 3 — New York, New York (Town Hall)
- December 4 — Washington, D.C. (Lincoln Theatre)
- December 6 — St. Paul, Minnesota (The Fitzgerald Theater)
- December 7 — Chicago, Illinois (Auditorium Theatre)
- December 8 — Detroit, Michigan (Royal Oak Music Theatre)
- December 9 — Indianapolis, Indiana (Murat Theatre at Old National Centre)
- December 11 — Austin, Texas (Paramount Theatre)
- December 12 —Dallas, Texas (Majestic Theatre)
- December 14 —Denver, Colorado (Paramount Theatre)
- December 16 — San Diego, California (Balboa Theatre)
- December 17 — San Francisco, California (The Warfield)
- December 18 — Los Angeles, California (Orpheum Theatre)
- December 21 — Seattle, Washington (Moore Theatre)
- December 22 — Seattle, Washington (Moore Theatre)
- December 23 — Seattle, Washington (Moore Theatre)
- December 24 — Seattle, Washington (Moore Theatre)
- December 27 — Portland, Oregon (Arlene Schnitzer Concert Hall)
- December 29 — Calgary, Alberta (Southern Alberta Jubilee Auditorium)
- December 30 — Vancouver, British Columbia (Vogue Theatre)

=== 2023 ===
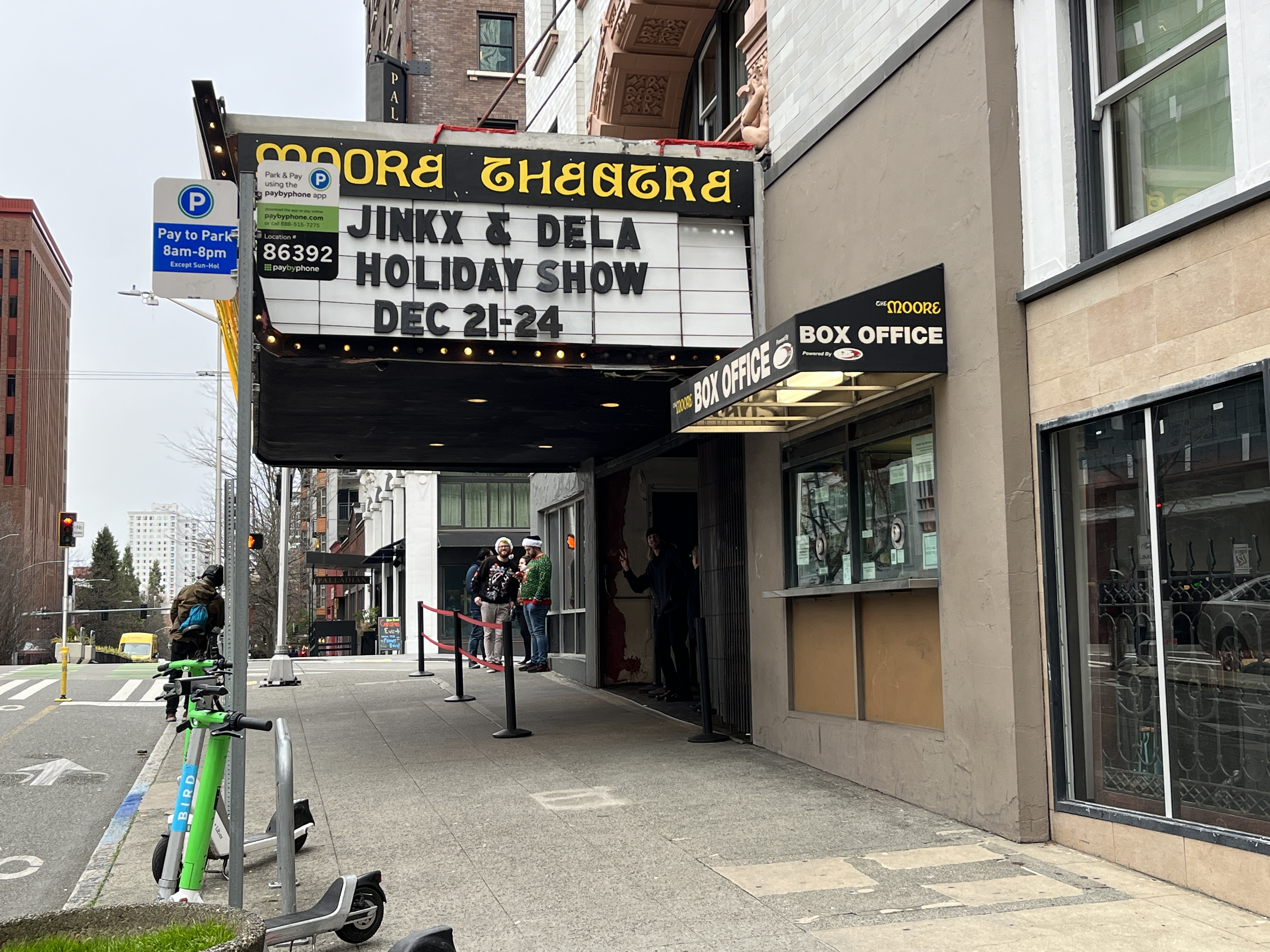
Marquee for The Jinkx and DeLa Holiday Show at the Moore Theatre, Seattle, 2023

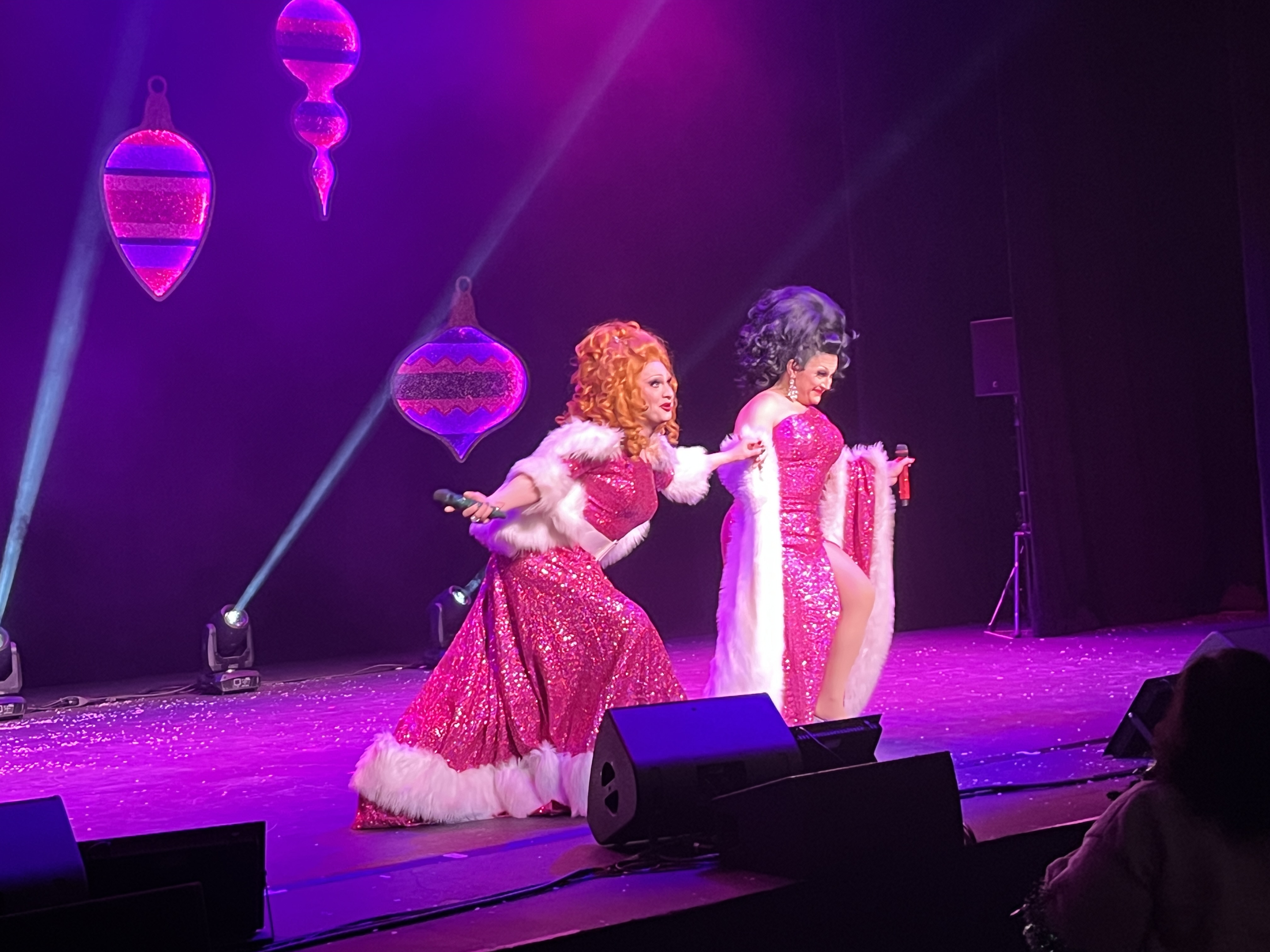
Jinkx Monsoon (left) and BenDeLaCreme (right) performing at Seattle's Moore Theatre, 2023

Source: Entertainment Weekly

- November 12 – Glasgow, U.K. (Theatre Royal)
- November 13 – London, U.K. (London Palladium)
- November 14 – Liverpool, U.K. (Liverpool Olympia)
- November 19 – Indianapolis, Indiana (Clowes Memorial Hall)
- November 20 – Cincinnati, Ohio (Taft Theatre)
- November 21 – Toronto, Ontario (Meridian Hall)
- November 23 – Montreal, Québec (L'Olympia)
- November 24 – Montreal, Québec (L'Olympia)
- November 25 – Hamilton, Ontario (FirstOntario Concert Hall)
- November 26 – Buffalo, New York (Shea's Performing Arts Center)
- November 28 – Boston, Massachusetts (Wang Theatre)
- November 29 – New Haven, Connecticut (College Street Music Hall)
- December 1 – Brooklyn, New York (Kings Theatre)
- December 2 – Richmond, Virginia (Carpenter Theatre)
- December 3 – Durham, North Carolina (Durham Performing Arts Center)
- December 4 – Atlanta, Georgia. (Symphony Hall)
- December 6 – Pittsburgh, Pennsylvania (Heinz Hall)
- December 7 – Tysons, Virginia (Capital One Hall)
- December 8 – Philadelphia, Pennsylvania (Miller Theater)
- December 10 – Chicago, Illinois (Auditorium Theatre)
- December 11 – Minneapolis, Minnesota (Northrop Theatre)
- December 12 – Kansas City, Missouri (Midland Theatre)
- December 13 – Grand Prairie, Texas / Dallas Metro (Texas Trust CU Theatre)
- December 14 – Austin, Texas (Bass Concert Hall)
- December 16 – Los Angeles, California (Dolby Theatre)
- December 17 – San Jose, California (San Jose Civic)
- December 18 – San Francisco, California (The Warfield)
- December 19 – San Francisco, California (The Warfield)
- December 21 – Seattle, Washington (Moore Theatre)
- December 22 – Seattle, Washington (Moore Theatre)
- December 23 – Seattle, Washington (Moore Theatre)
- December 24 – Seattle, Washington (Moore Theatre – matinee)
- December 27 – Portland, Oregon (Arlene Schnitzer Concert Hall)
- December 29 – Edmonton, Alberta. (Northern Alberta Jubilee Auditorium)
- December 30 – Vancouver, British Columbia (Orpheum)
