= Darienne Lake =

American drag queen (born 1971)

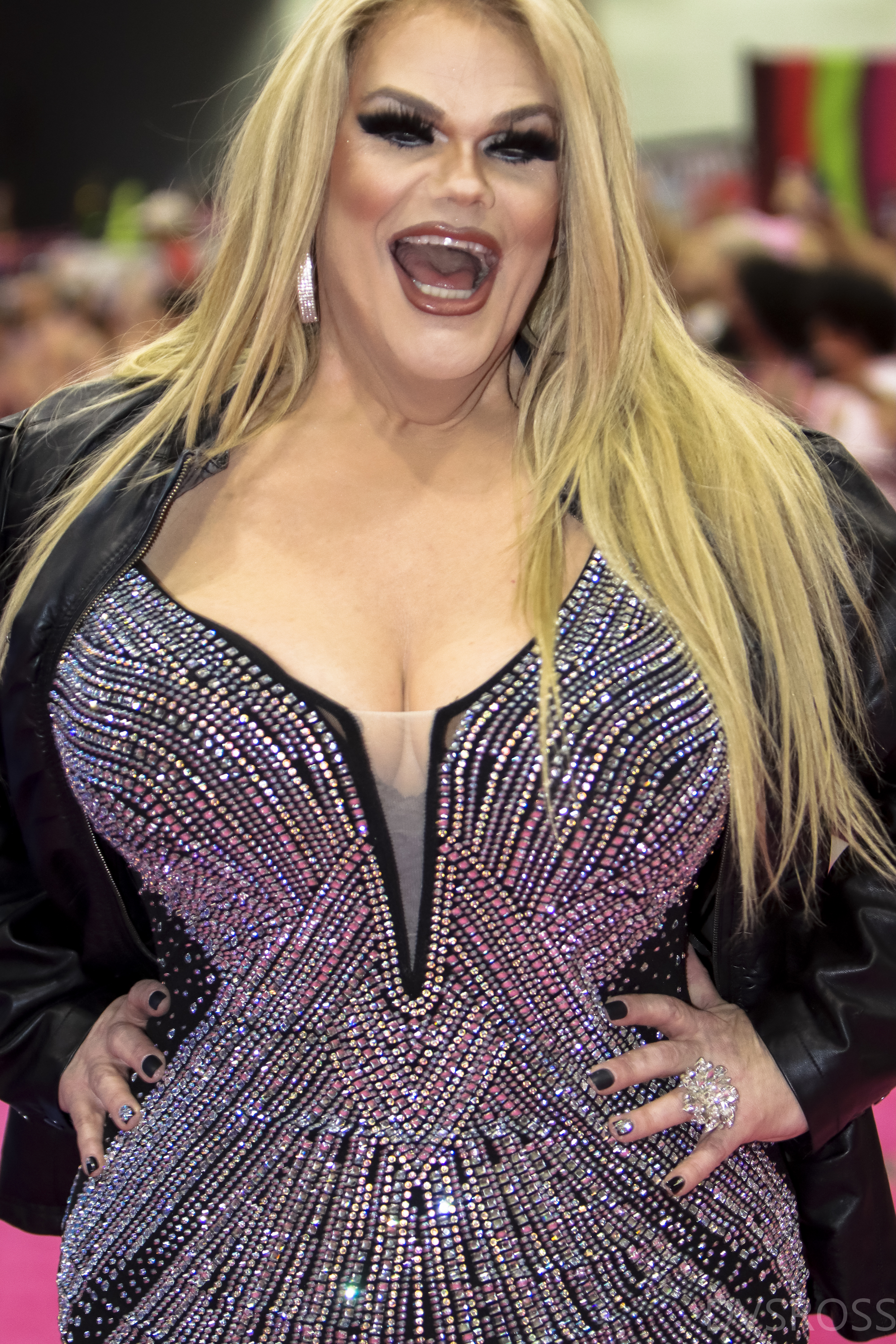
- Lake at RuPaul's DragCon LA in 2022
- Born: Greg Meyer; November 27, 1971 (age 54); Long Island, New York, U.S.
- Occupations: Drag queen, television personality
- Years active: 1990–present

Greg Meyer (born November 27, 1971), better known by the stage name Darienne Lake, is a drag queen and television personality. Lake began performing in drag in 1990 in Rochester, New York, before rising to prominence after competing on the sixth season of RuPaul's Drag Race, placing fourth. After appearing on the reality television show, Darienne Lake toured internationally, released a comedy album, and performed in film, television, and numerous web series.

== Early life ==
Lake was born on Long Island, New York, and moved to Rochester at age eleven. As a middle child of five, she felt ignored growing up. At age eighteen, her mother kicked her out of her home due to her sexual orientation; her mother has since apologized.

== Career ==
=== Early work ===
Lake’s drag career began in Rochester, New York, following her first year of college in 1990. She was inspired by a drag queen’s performance as Dr. Frank-N-Furter in a local production of The Rocky Horror Picture Show. When her friends put her up in drag, they said she resembled Ricki Lake in Hairspray (1988); the stage name Darienne Lake is an homage to her as well as to the Six Flags Darien Lake amusement park. Lake later appeared on a 1997 episode of The Ricki Lake Show about plus-sized drag queens. Lake's drag mother, Naomi Kane, was also the drag mother of Mrs. Kasha Davis.

Since the 1990s, Lake has been active in the New York drag community and has performed across the United States and internationally. Lake held the title of Miss Gay Rochester in 1998–1999.

In 2003, she appeared in a VH1 documentary about drag titled Boys Will Be Girls, alongside her drag daughter Pandora Boxx, who went on to become a contestant on the second season of RuPaul’s Drag Race as well as the first season of RuPaul's Drag Race All Stars.

=== Drag Race ===
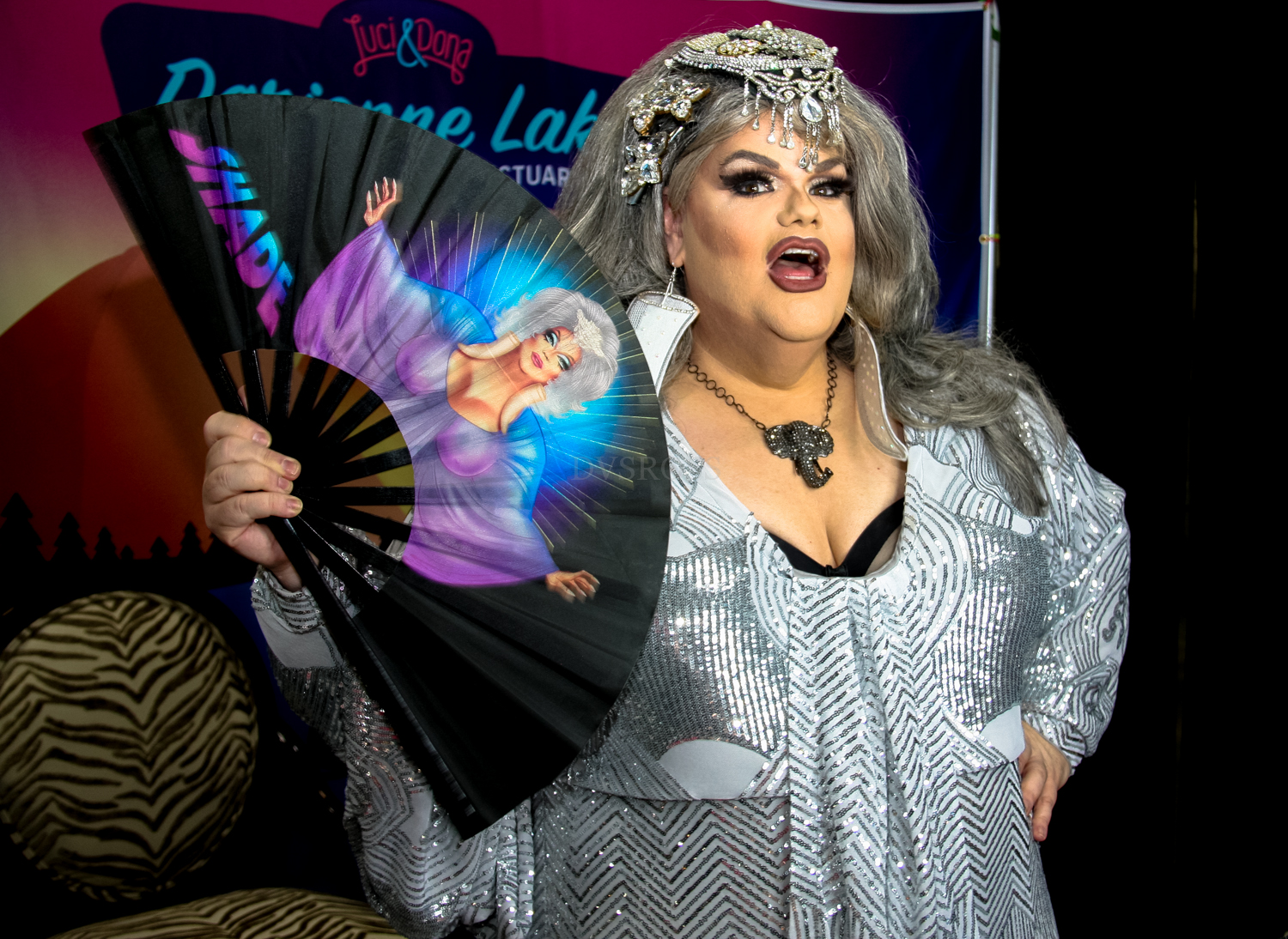
Darienne Lake at RuPaul's DragCon LA in 2019

Lake rose to international prominence after winning the fan vote to appear on the sixth season of Drag Race. During the series, Lake won a main challenge (episode three) and ultimately finished the competition in fourth place behind Adore Delano, Courtney Act, and eventual winner Bianca Del Rio.

In 2018, Lake appeared in Hurricane Bianca: From Russia with Hate.

Lake has been praised for her lip syncing skills, having survived three lip syncs for your life on Drag Race. IndieWire wrote that Lake "lip syncs like the rent is due". Vulture ranked Lake as one of the top 100 most powerful drag queens in America in 2019.

Darienne Lake competed on the eighth season of RuPaul's Drag Race All Stars (2023). She ultimately finished the competition in ninth place.

== Personal life ==
In 2020, Lake underwent surgery for melanoma. Her uncle Tony survived the September 11th terrorist attack, escaping from the North Tower.

== Discography ==
=== Albums ===
==== Studio albums ====
Title	Details
Altered Boy	Released: April 7, 2023; Label: Comedy Dynamics

=== Singles ===
==== As featured artist ====
Title	Year	Album
"Shade: The Rusical" (with the cast of RuPaul's Drag Race, season 6)	2014	Shade: The Rusical Album
"Oh No, She Betta Don't! (Team Panty Ho's)" (with the cast of RuPaul's Drag Race, season 6)	2014	Non-album single
"Money, Success, Fame, Glamour" (Glam Rock version) (with the cast of RuPaul's Drag Race All Stars, season 8)	2023	Non-album single

=== Other appearances ===
Song	Year	Other Artist(s)	Album
"Lick It Lollipop"	2014	RuPaul	RuPaul Presents: The CoverGurlz
"Christmas is Coming"	2015	Ivy Winters & Pandora Boxx	Christmas Queens

== Filmography ==
=== Film ===
Year	Title	Role	Notes
2003	Boys Will Be Girls	Herself	
2008	Mrs. Kasha Davis: The Life of an International Housewife Celebrity	Gladys Butts	Short film, credited as Greg Mayer
2015	This is Drag	Herself	
2018	Hurricane Bianca: From Russia with Hate	Gorky Park	

=== Television ===
Year	Title	Role	Notes
1996	Ricki Lake	Herself	Episode: "Get a Grip Doll... You're Too Fat to Be a Drag Queen"
2014	RuPaul's Drag Race	Herself	Season 6, Contestant; 4th place
2014	RuPaul's Drag Race: Untucked!	Herself	Season 6, Contestant; 4th place
2018	Hey Qween!	Herself	
2023	RuPaul's Drag Race All Stars	Herself	Contestant; 9th place
2023	RuPaul's Drag Race All Stars: Untucked	Herself	Contestant; 9th place
2023	Drag Me to Dinner	Herself	Hulu original reality series

=== Web series ===
Year	Title	Role	Notes	Ref.
2023	Meet the Queens	Herself	Stand-alone special RuPaul’s Drag Race All Stars 8	
2023	EW News Flash	Herself	Guest	
2023	BuzzFeed Celeb	Herself	Guest	
2023	Give It To Me Straight	Herself	Guest	
2023	Very Delta	Herself	Guest	
2024	House of Laughs	Herself	WOWPresents Plus original	
