= Manila Luzon =

Filipino-American drag performer (born 1981)

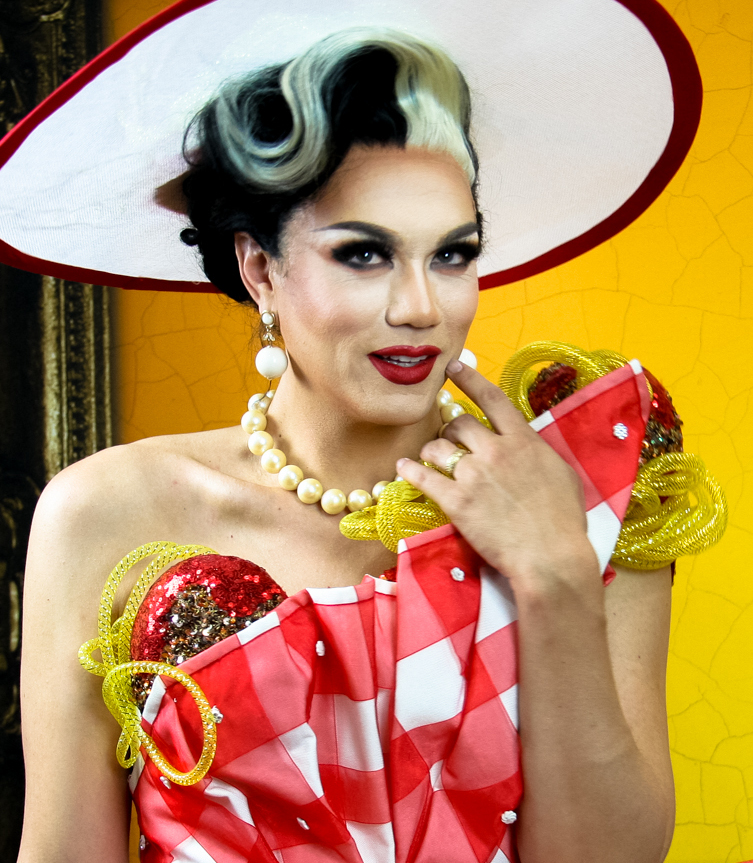
- Luzon at RuPaul's DragCon (2019)
- Born: Karl Philip Michael Westerberg; 10 August 1981 (age 45); Ramsey, Minnesota, U.S.
- Education: University of Minnesota, Duluth (BFA)
- Occupations: Drag queen; comedian; television personality; musician
- Spouse: Michael Alvarez (m. 2017)
- Partner(s): Antoine Ashley (2006–2012; Ashley's death)

Comedy career
- Genres: Blue comedy; observational comedy
- Subjects: LGBT culture; Philippine culture; fashion
- Musical career
- Genre: Pop
- Instrument: Vocals
- Years active: 2011–present
- Labels: Producer Entertainment Group; Warner Music Philippines
- Website: manilaluzon.com

Karl Philip Michael Westerberg (born August 10, 1981), known professionally as Manila Luzon, is an American drag queen, reality television personality, recording artist, and comedian. Luzon came to international attention as a contestant on the third season of RuPaul's Drag Race (2011) and on the first and fourth seasons of RuPaul's Drag Race All Stars (2012, 2018).

Luzon has also contributed to the compilation album series Christmas Queens, and has received a Daytime Emmy Award nomination.

== Early life ==
Westerberg was born to a mother from Manila, in the island Luzon of the Philippines (where he took his drag name), and an American father. Westerberg was raised Catholic. Westerberg grew up in Cottage Grove, Minnesota.

== Career ==
=== 2011–2012: Breakthrough with RuPaul's Drag Race ===
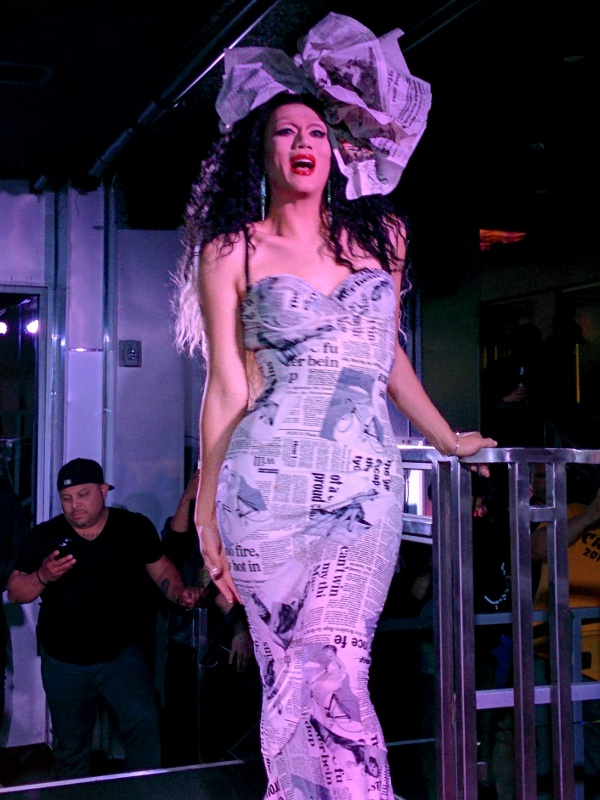
Manila performing in May 2014

With the success of RuPaul's Drag Race, Luzon auditioned for the third season of the reality series, and went on to appear in every episode until its finale. She lip-synced against Raja Gemini to "Champion (DJ BunJoe's Olympic Mix)" by RuPaul but lost the lip-sync and became the runner-up of the season.

The publicity generated by her participation in the show brought many new opportunities to perform at various national and international LGBT events throughout the United States and Canada, including New York Pride and Vancouver Pride. She has been active in AIDS awareness and activism. After being featured in a Gilead Sciences ad titled "Red Ribbon Runway" with fellow Drag Race co-stars Carmen Carrera, Delta Work, Shangela and Alexis Mateo, the dress she was featured wearing was auctioned off by Logo TV in commemoration of World AIDS Day. Proceeds from the auction were donated to the National Association of People with AIDS.

In 2011, Luzon, along with third season Drag Race contestants Carmen Carrera and Shangela, appeared in a television commercial for travel-related website Orbitz. In addition to the commercial, she and Shangela also did an entertainment news segment for US Weekly where they discussed current male celebrities and reimagine them as drag queens. In August 2012, NiniMomo, a Long Island-based company specializing in poseable fashion dolls, released a doll in Luzon's likeness and wearing the now famous pineapple dress she wore during her time on Drag Race. The doll, which was available via special order, marked the first time a Drag Race contestant has been immortalized as a doll. Two years later, a couple of fans of Manila produced their very own 3D-printed Manila Luzon doll.

On August 6, 2012, it was announced that Manila was one of twelve past Drag Race contestants selected to join the cast of the first season of RuPaul's Drag Race: All Stars, which premiered on the Logo network on October 22, 2012. Paired with contestant Latrice Royale to form Team Latrila, the duo was eliminated in the third episode of the series that aired on November 5, 2012, placing in joint 7th/8th place. Their elimination was one of many who led to widespread criticism of the first installment of All Stars. On October 12, 2012, Manila appeared on an episode of the MTV series Made where she mentored a young man in the art of drag, allowing him to explore his drag alter-ego as he prepared for New York City's Gay Pride March. Prior to the airing of the season finale of RuPaul's Drag Race All Stars, Manila (along with All Stars contestants Raven, Latrice Royale, and Tammie Brown) appeared in a television commercial for travel website Orbitz's new portal for LGBT leisure travel. After the season, Luzon was a playable character with Pandora Boxx and Yara Sofia for the "RuPaul's Drag Race: Dragopolis" mobile app.

=== 2018–present: All Stars 4, debut album and upcoming projects ===
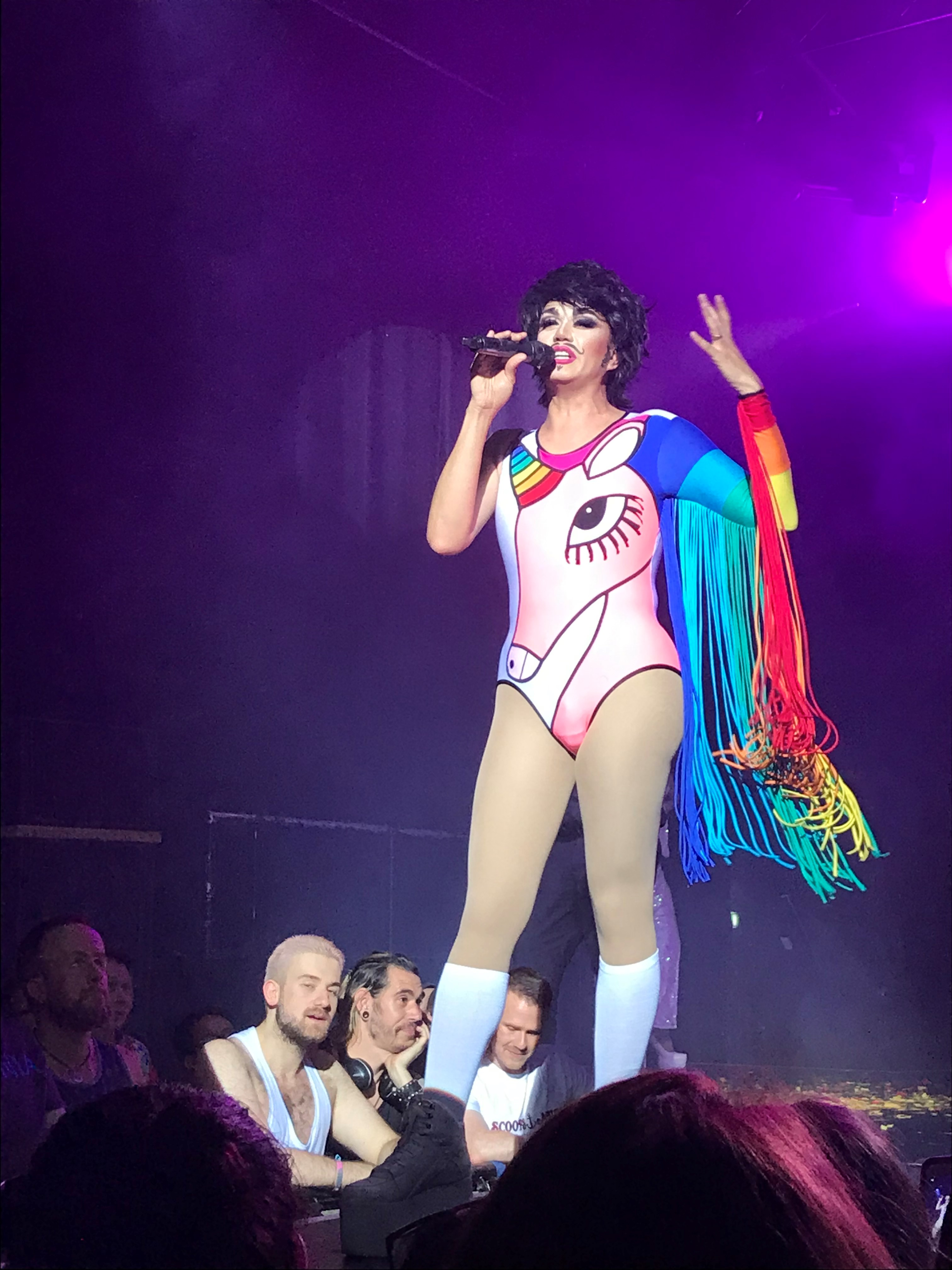
Manila Luzon performing in July 2019

On November 9, 2018, it was announced that Manila would return to All Stars 4, alongside fellow All Stars 1 Team Latrila team-mate Latrice Royale, but this time would compete separately against each other rather than as a team. Despite being one of the season's front-runners with three challenge wins, Manila was controversially eliminated by Naomi Smalls in the eighth episode of the season, which aired on February 1, 2019, ultimately placing sixth. On November 16, 2018, indie musician VELO released the single "Where My Man At," featuring Luzon and Drag Race season 9 and season 10 contestant Eureka O'Hara. The two also appear in the song's music video (together with Thorgy Thor, Ginger Minj and Trinity the Tuck). She later appeared as a guest for the first challenge in the premiere of season 11 of Drag Race. On February 1, 2019, Luzon released her single "Go Fish" alongside its music video. The video features fellow All Stars 4 contestant Naomi Smalls, Luzon's husband, and the Heathers, a prominent clique of Drag Race 3 contestants featuring Luzon, Raja, Delta Work, and Carmen Carrera. Following the buzz of her controversial departure in All Stars, the video received more than 300,000 views in less than 24 hours. Luzon made a guest appearance on General Hospital in late summer 2019. In June 2019, a panel of judges from New York magazine placed her 19th on their list of "the most powerful drag queens in America", a ranking of 100 former Drag Race contestants.

Luzon is the host and head judge of the Amazon Prime Video Filipino reality competition series Drag Den, taking on the role of 'Drag Lord'. Since its debut in December 2022, two seasons of Drag Den have aired. Luzon also serves as an executive producer of the series.

== Personal life ==
A longtime resident of Manhattan, Westerberg resided in Harlem with his boyfriend at the time, Antoine Ashley (Sahara Davenport), who Luzon began dating in 2007 and was a contestant on the second season of Drag Race. Ashley later died of heart failure at Johns Hopkins Hospital in Baltimore on October 1, 2012. Westerberg studied graphic design at the University of Minnesota Duluth.

In November 2016, Westerberg proposed to his boyfriend Michael Alvarez, also known as Mic J Rez. On December 24, 2017, the couple wed at the Silver Bells Wedding Chapel, with an Elvis impersonator as the officiant.

As of 2013, Westerberg resides in Los Angeles, California where he moved shortly after Ashley's death. Westerberg resides in Los Angeles, but he also considers New York City home.

== Discography ==
=== Studio album ===
Title	Details	Peak chart positions
Title	Details	US Comedy
Rules!	Released: February 15, 2019; Label: Producer Entertainment Group; Formats: Digital download	3

=== Mixtapes ===
Title	Details
Eternal Queen	Released: October 1, 2014; Label: Lomplex; Formats: Digital download

=== Remix extended plays ===
Title	Details
Hot Couture (Remixes)	Released: April 24, 2012; Label: Karl Westerberg; Formats: Digital download
Best Xxxcessory: The Remixxxes	Released: October 22, 2012; Label: Manila Luzon; Formats: Digital download
The Chop Remixes	Released: December 26, 2012; Label: Manila Luzon; Formats: Digital download
Bring It!, Remixes, Pt. 1	Released: January 17, 2014; Label: JRED Music; Formats: Digital download
Helen Keller	Released: January 28, 2014; Label: Peace Bisquit; Formats: Digital download
Bring It!, Remixes, Pt. 2	Released: March 14, 2014; Label: JRED Music; Formats: Digital download

=== Singles ===
Title	Year	Peak chart positions	Album
Title	Year	US Comedy Digital	Album
"Hot Couture"	2011	—	Non-album singles
"Best XXXcessory"	2012	—	Non-album singles
"The Chop" (featuring Latrice Royale)	2012	—	Non-album singles
"Bring It!" (featuring Jinkx Monsoon)	2013	—	Non-album singles
"Helen Keller" (with Cazwell, featuring Roxy & Richie Beretta)	2014	—	Non-album singles
"Ice Cream" (featuring Andre Xcellence!)	2015	—	Non-album singles
"Ovahness"	2016	—	Non-album singles
"That's a Man Maury" (featuring Willam)	2017	—	Non-album singles
"Go Fish"	2019	3	Rules
"Barbra, Can You Hear Me" (with Cazwell)	2019	—	Rules
"Hella Horny"	2019	—	Non-album single

=== As featured artist ===
Title	Year	Album
"Bitch I'm a Bottom" (Pablo Hernandez featuring Manila Luzon)	2015	Non-album singles
"Don't Funk it Up" (with the cast of RuPaul's Drag Race All Stars, season 4)	2018	Non-album singles
"My Pussy is Like a Peach" (Christmas Remix) (Choriza May featuring Manila Luzon)	2021	Non-album singles
"The Big Opening" (Ginger Minj and Monét X Change featuring the cast of Huluween Dragstravaganza)	2022	Non-album singles
"She" (Velo featuring Manila Luzon)	2022	Non-album singles
"Trinity Ruins Christmas" (Trinity the Tuck featuring Manila Luzon)	2023	Trinity Ruins Christmas: The Musical
"Good Enough" (Trinity the Tuck featuring Manila Luzon)	2023	Trinity Ruins Christmas: The Musical

=== Other appearances ===
Title	Year	Other Artist(s)	Album
"Lady Marmalade"	2014	Raja, Delta Work and Carmen Carrera (as The Heathers)	Non-album singles
"Bitch I'm a Bottom"	2015	Pablo Hernandez	Non-album singles
"Slay Bells"	2015	N/A	Christmas Queens
"Working Holiday"	2016	Alaska Thunderfuck	Christmas Queens 2
"Click (Manila Mix)"	2017	Tom Goss	Click
"We Three Queens"	2017	Alaska Thunderfuck, Peppermint	Christmas Queens 3
"Purong Pinay"	2018	Jiggly Caliente	T.H.O.T. Process
"Don't Funk It Up"	2018	RuPaul, Gia Gunn, Latrice Royale, Valentina, Trinity the Tuck	Non-album single
"The Kitty Girl County Spelling Bee (Interlude)"	2019	Nina West, Vanessa Vanjie Mateo	Drag Is Magic

== Filmography ==
=== Film ===
Year	Title	Role	Notes
2018	Justice League : A Gay XXX Parody	Wonder Woman	Porn parody
2018	The Cocoa Fondue Show	Mulan Rouge	Short Film
2019	The Queens	Herself	Documentary
2021	The Bitch Who Stole Christmas	Mother	

=== Television ===
Year	Title	Role	Notes	Ref
2011	RuPaul's Drag Race	Himself/Contestant	Runner-up	
2011	RuPaul's Drag Race: Untucked	Himself/Contestant		
2011–2012	RuPaul's Drag U	Himself/Professor	Recurring	
2012	The Real Housewives of New York City	Herself	Season 5, episode 2	
2012	RuPaul's Drag Race All Stars	Herself (contestant)	Season 1: 7/8th place	
2015–2019	EastSiders	Amanda	6 episodes	
2016	Gay for Play Game Show Starring RuPaul	Herself	1 episode	
2017	Ya Killin' Me	Dr. Delicious		
2018	The Trixie & Katya Show	Herself	4 episodes	
2018	America's Next Top Model	Herself	1 episode	
2018	RuPaul's Drag Race (season 10)	Herself	Guest – Episode 1	
2018	RuPaul's Drag Race All Stars	Herself (contestant)	Season 4: 6th	
2019	General Hospital	Bingo Host		
2020	AJ and the Queen	Drag Queen	Season 1, episode 1: "New York City"	
2021	Celebrity Karaoke Club: Drag Edition	Himself/Contestant		
2021	RuPaul's Drag Race All Stars (season 6)	Herself	"Lip-Sync Assassin", episode 6	
2021	RuPaul's Drag Race All Stars: Untucked (season 3)	Herself	"Lip-Sync Assassin", episode 6	
2021	Rated Korina	Herself	Guest appearance	
2022	Drag Race España (season 2)	Herself	Guest appearance, episode 10	
2022	We Baby Bears	Gouda	Voice role, episode 26	
2022	Huluween Dragstravaganza	Herself	Hulu special	
2022	Drag Den	Herself	Main Host	
2023	57th Annual CMT Music Awards	Herself	Performer with Kelsea Ballerini, Jan Sport, Kennedy Davenport & Olivia Lux	
2023	Celebrity Family Feud	Herself	Guest	
2023	Drag Me to Dinner	Herself	Hulu original	
2024	Drag Den (season 2)	Herself	Main Host	
2024	Open to It	Rita Manuel	Episode: "Open to Dirty Talk"	
2025	Drag House Rules	Herself (Fictionalized)	Main cast	
2026	Worst Cooks in America	Herself	Contestant (Season 30)	

=== Music videos ===
Year	Title	Artist	Ref.
2011	"Champion"	RuPaul	
2011	"Go Off"	Sahara Davenport	
2013	"Woman's World" (Remix)	Cher	
2015	"I Still Love You"	Jennifer Hudson	
2016	"Around The World"	Kings of Leon	
2016	"Purse First"	Bob The Drag Queen	
2018	"Tried & True"	Chester Lockhart	
2018	"Oops I Think I Pooped"	Pandora Boxx	
2018	"Call My Life"	Blair St. Clair	
2019	"Scores"	Kahanna Montrese	
2020	"Nerves of Steel"	Erasure	

=== Web ===
Year	Title	Role	Notes	Ref.
2013	Transformations	Herself	Guest	
2013	Ring My Bell	Herself	Guest	
2013	RuPaul Drives	Herself	Episode: "RuPaul Drives... Manila Luzon"	
2014	WOWPresents Shopping Network	Herself	Guest, Episode: "Born Naked"	
2014	Once Upon a Crime	Snow White	Episode 5: "Cinderella vs. Snow White”	
2014-2021	Hey Qween!	Herself	Guest; 3 episodes	
2014–2019	Fashion Photo RuView	Herself	Recurring guest co-host	
2017–2023	The Pit Stop	Herself	Recurring guest (season 11 host)	
2018	Feelin' Fruity	Herself	Guest	
2018	Out of the Closet	Herself	Guest	
2019	Iconic	Herself	Guest	
2019	Reading Queens	Herself	Guest	
2020	Supbruh	Herself	Guest	
2024	Very Delta	Herself	Guest	

== Awards and nominations ==
Name of the award ceremony, year presented, category, nominee of the award, and the result of the nomination
Award ceremony	Year	Category	Nominee / Work	Result	Ref.
Asian Academy Creative Awards	2023	Best Entertainment Host (Note: The series won both categories, National Winners and Grand Final Winners for the Philippines, awarded by the Asian Academy Creative Awards.)	Drag Den	Won	
Asian Television Awards	2023	Best Entertainment Presenter or Host	Drag Den	Won	
Daytime Emmy Awards	2020	Outstanding Makeup	EastSiders	Nominated	

== See also ==
- Drag culture in New York City
- Filipinos in the New York metropolitan area
- LGBT culture in New York City
- List of LGBT people from New York City
- NYC Pride March
