= Jiggly Caliente =

Filipino-American drag performer (1980–2025)

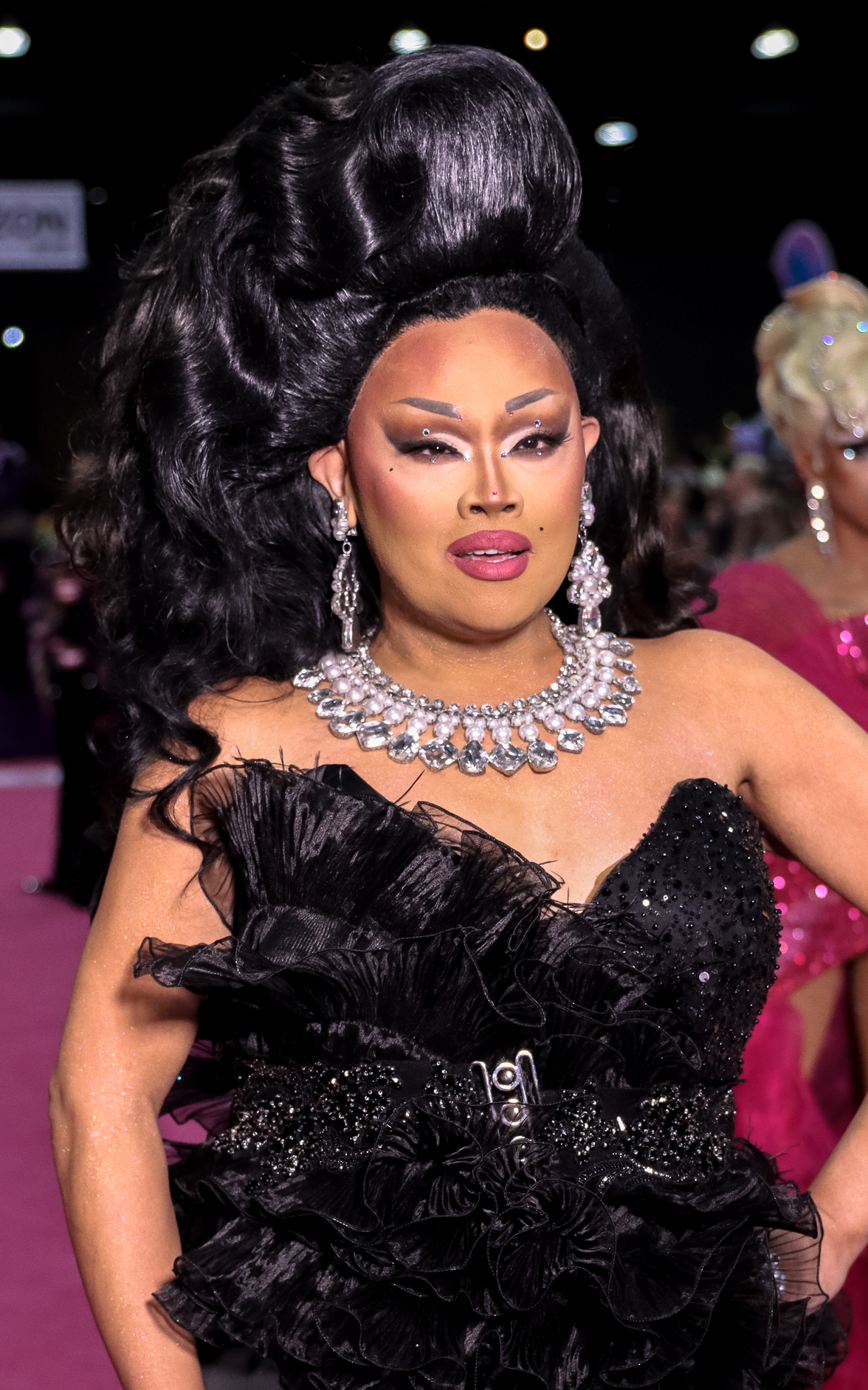
- Jiggly Caliente at RuPaul's DragCon LA, 2023
- Born: November 29, 1980; San Pedro, Laguna, Philippines
- Died: April 27, 2025 (aged 44); New York City, U.S.
- Education: Fashion Institute of Technology (dropped out)
- Occupations: Drag queen; singer; television personality
- Television: RuPaul's Drag Race; Drag Race Philippines

Bianca Castro-Arabejo (November 29, 1980 – April 27, 2025), known professionally as Jiggly Caliente, was a Filipino-American transgender drag performer and entertainer. She rose to prominence competing on the fourth season of RuPaul's Drag Race (2012), followed by her debut studio album T.H.O.T. Process (2018), and a recurring role as Veronica Ferocity in the American drama television series Pose (2018–2021). After competing in the sixth season of RuPaul's Drag Race All Stars (2021), she became a judge on Drag Race Philippines (2022–2024).

== Early life and education ==
Caliente was born in San Pedro, Laguna, in the Philippines on November 29, 1980. She grew up Catholic. During the first grade, she was bullied and body-shamed by a fellow student, and was expelled for stabbing the student's hand with a pencil. Caliente spoke of her father's mistreatment towards the household: "My dad wasn’t too good to us." Her parents divorced when she was a child and she later immigrated to the United States at age 10 in 1991 alongside her mother and brother. She was raised in the Sunnyside neighborhood of Queens, New York.

In Caliente's junior year of high school she came out as gay to her mother. Caliente became interested in being a cartoonist and attended the Fashion Institute of Technology (FIT) majoring in illustration. She soon realized, that "comic books were kind of like a dying art form" and dropped out.

== Career and Drag Race ==
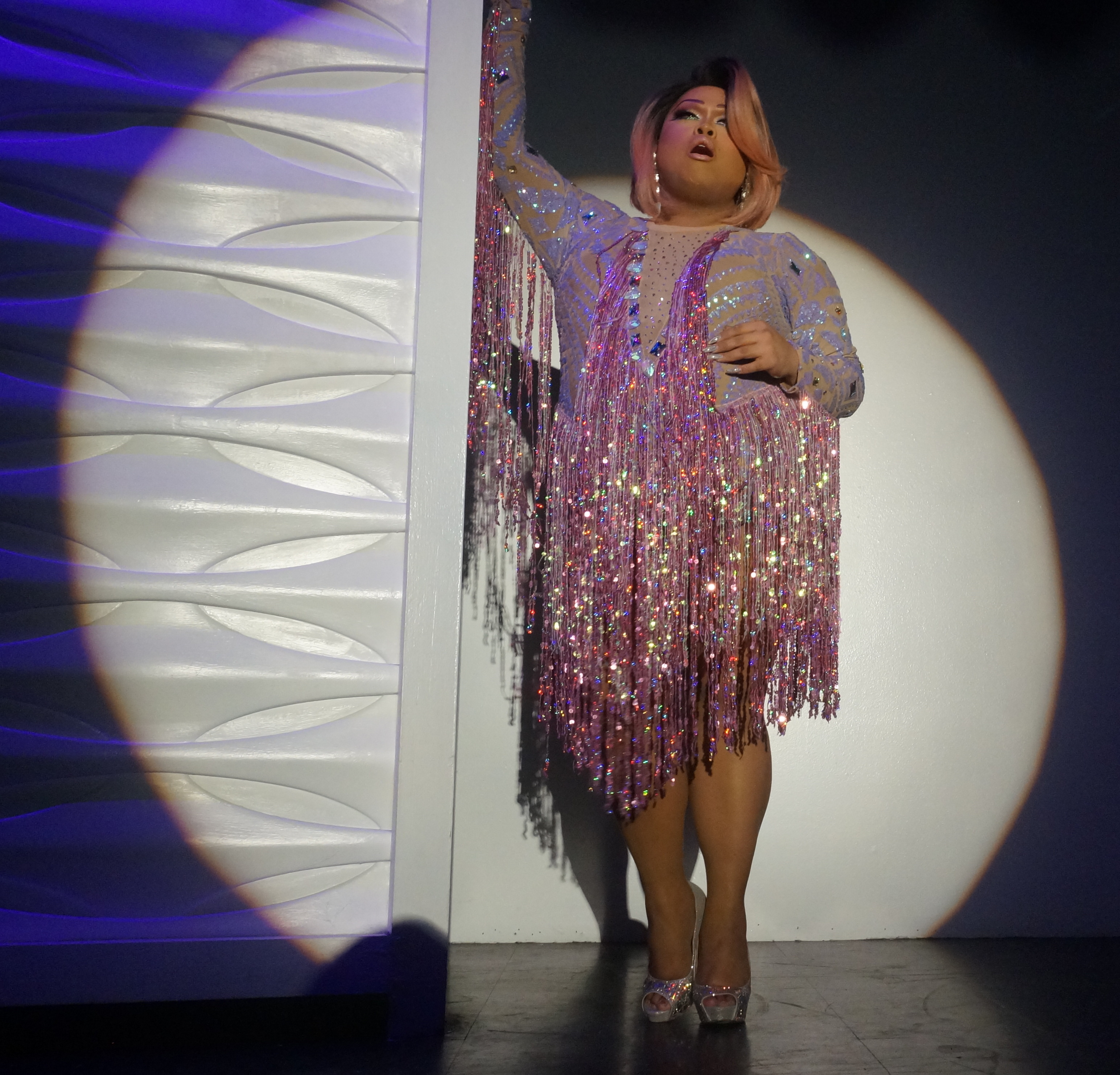
Jiggly Caliente performing in 2017

Caliente first created her drag persona in 2004 or 2005 on a dare after she came to support a friend who was competing in a drag competition. She named herself after the Pokémon character Jigglypuff and added the Spanish word caliente meaning hot. Jiggly Caliente once worked at the Web, a gay Asian nightclub in New York City known for its sexual services, and stated, "I just don't think anyone should be ashamed for it." She soon began competing in beauty pageants and was crowned as Ms. Asia America 2006, Ms. Mexico New York 2008, and Ms. Universo Latina Plus 2009.

Caliente was announced as one of thirteen contestants of the fourth season of RuPaul's Drag Race on November 13, 2011. She placed eighth overall, being eliminated in a lip-sync contest by Willam. Jiggly Caliente appeared in archive footage in the finale of the fifth season and made an appearance in the finale of the sixth season, where she asked a viewer question to contestant Bianca Del Rio.

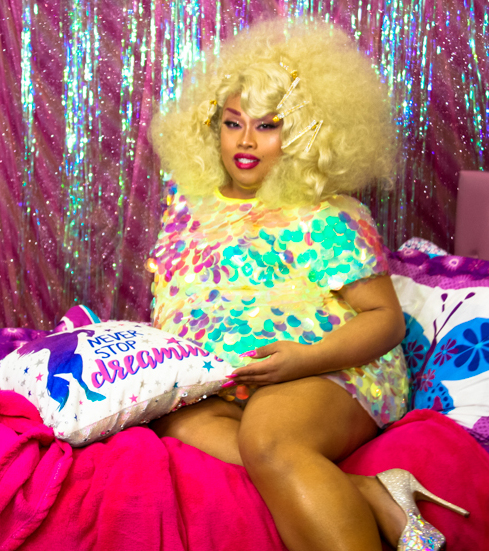
Jiggly Caliente at RuPaul's DragCon LA, 2018

Outside of Drag Race, Caliente was seen in the beginning of the 2012 NewNowNext awards. Her acting career began in 2015 when she played a role in the season-two finale of Broad City as a shop owner. She was one of thirty drag queens featured in Miley Cyrus's 2015 VMA performance. In 2016, she was in the pilot episode of Search Party. In 2017, she made a cameo appearance with fellow Drag Race contestants Bob The Drag Queen, Katya, and Detox in an episode of Playing House. She made an appearance as a backup singer in the music video for Bob The Drag Queen and Alaska's "Yet Another Dig". She played the character Veronica in Pose, appearing in the sixth and eighth episodes of the first season. She later confirmed she would be back for more episodes of the show's second season.

In September 2018, Caliente performed as a background dancer for Christina Aguilera at Opening Ceremony's Spring 2019 runway show alongside other Drag Race contestants. In November 2018, she made an appearance on Saturday Night Live with Drag Race contestant Peppermint, as a Drag Queen for the Garmin GP-Yasss sketch. In 2020, Jiggly Caliente co-hosted Translation, the first talk show on a major network hosted by an all-trans cast. On May 26, 2021, she was announced to be one of the 13 contestants returning for the sixth season of RuPaul's Drag Race All Stars. She was eliminated in the second episode, placing twelfth overall. She was a main judge for the first, second, and third seasons of Drag Race Philippines, which premiered in 2022.

=== Music ===
Jiggly Caliente released her first single, "Fckboi" on March 1, 2018, on her official Vevo channel. She released her debut album, T.H.O.T. Process on March 9, 2018. The twelve-track album features Drag Race contestants Sharon Needles, Peppermint, Alaska, Ginger Minj, Phi Phi O'Hara (credited as Jaremi Carey) and Manila Luzon. It also features an intro with RuPaul. The album is the first hip-hop-based record by a Drag Race contestant. The music video for the song "All This Body" premiered on November 30, 2018, and featured Alaska, Ginger Minj, and Isis King.

Jiggly Caliente also was a featured artist for the first three volumes of the Drag Race Christmas Queens albums. The music video for "Ratchet Christmas" from the first volume was uploaded on December 9, 2015. She contributed to the compilation album Christmas Queens 3 (2017).

== Personal life ==
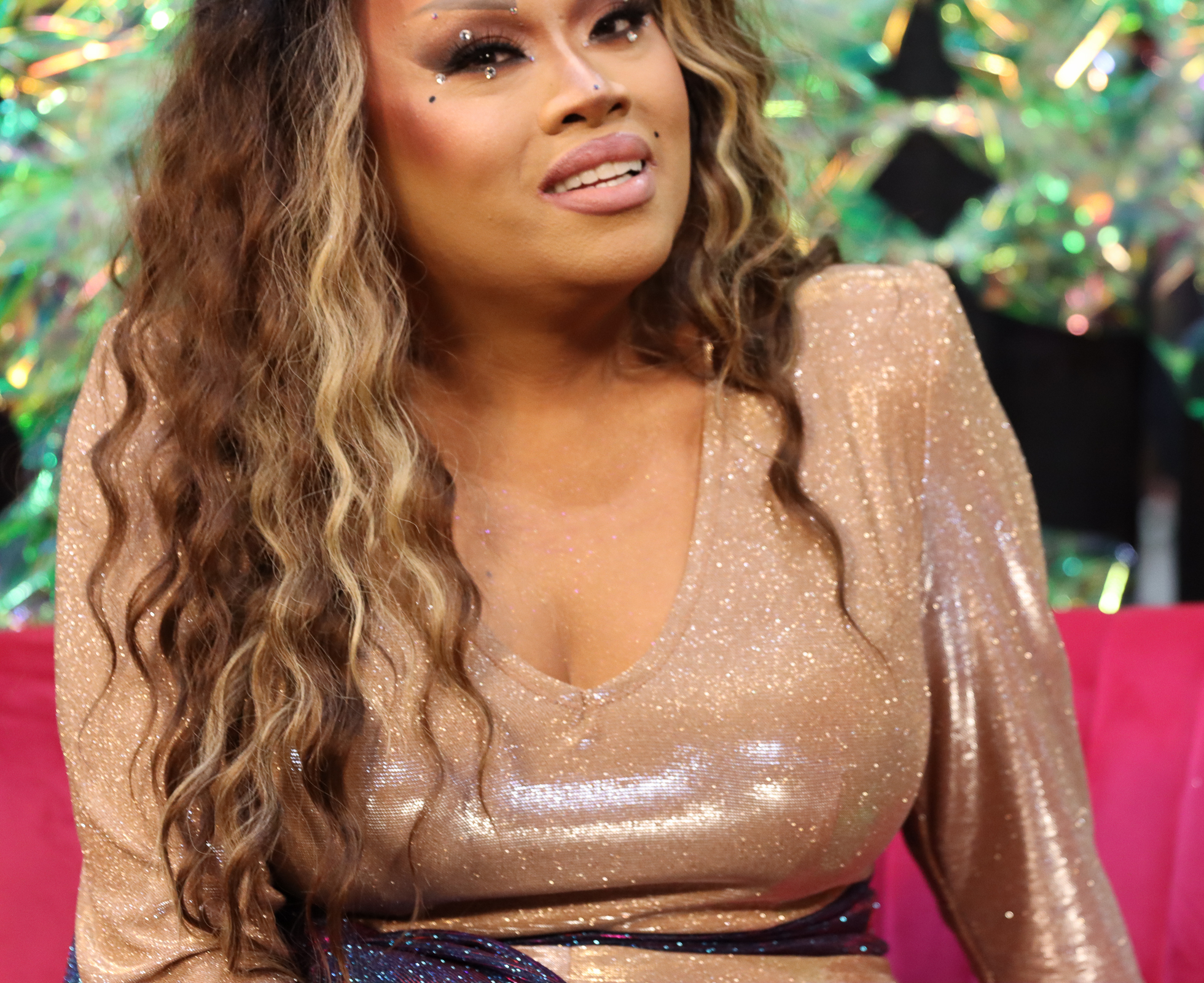
Jiggly Caliente at RuPaul's DragCon LA in 2023

Caliente was Catholic. She publicly came out as transgender in 2016. She shared her transgender identity for the first time on a podcast, stating that receiving letters from fans who were struggling with their own gender identity helped her to realize she was a trans woman. Two months later, she wrote on Instagram that "our trans brothers and sisters are very much part of our struggle for equality" and publicly encouraged Drag Race fans to engage in advocacy for trans rights.

=== Illness and death ===
On April 24, 2025, Caliente's family revealed in a statement that her right leg had been surgically amputated due to a severe infection. She died in hospital three days later, at age 44. Caliente's family announced that a livestreamed funeral would take place in New York City sometime in May, and that there would be a special moment set aside for fans to visit and pay respects.

Fellow Drag Race alumni and celebrities posted tributes to Caliente on social media. The premiere season of Drag Race Philippines: Slaysian Royale paid several tributes to Caliente, including a tearful episode where the cast learns of her death mid-episode.

Some drag artists and social commentators received widespread criticism for how they reacted to the news of her death. Former Olympic swimmer Sharron Davies attacked the BBC for publishing Caliente's obituary on the grounds that the network publishes "endless drag stories", which resulted in the Green Party deputy leader Zack Polanski publicly criticizing Davies' comments as "disgusting". Similarly, Tyra Sanchez, the winner of the second season of Drag Race, was widely criticized after she replied to an ode to Caliente posted by Jaremi Carey with a meme that mocked Caliente for losing her leg prior to her death. Friends and family of Caliente condemned Sanchez's statements, and some commentators made connections to how Sanchez had also made similarly controversial remarks about The Vivienne following her sudden death months prior in January 2025.

Caliente was inducted to the National LGBTQ Wall of Honor, a monument inside New York City’s Stonewall Inn, in June 2025 alongside seven other transgender advocates.

== Discography ==
=== Albums ===
| Title | Details |
|---|---|
| T.H.O.T. Process | Released: March 9, 2018; Label: Producer Entertainment Group; Format: Streaming |

=== Singles ===
| Title | Year | Album | Ref. |
|---|---|---|---|
| "Fckboi" | 2018 | T.H.O.T. Process | |
| "All This Body" | 2018 | T.H.O.T. Process | |

== Filmography ==
=== Film ===
| Year | Title | Role | Notes | Ref. |
|---|---|---|---|---|
| 2019 | The Queens | Herself | Documentary | |
| 2020 | Milkwater | Gigi Sordide | Feature film | |

=== Television ===
| Year | Title | Role | Ref. |
|---|---|---|---|
| 2010 | Ugly Betty | Season 4, Episode 13: "Chica and the Man" | |
| 2012 | RuPaul's Drag Race (season 4) | Contestant (8th place) | |
| 2012 | RuPaul's Drag Race: Untucked | Herself | |
| 2014 | RuPaul's Drag Race (season 6) | Herself | |
| 2015, 2019 | Broad City | Shop owner, Brunch Drag Queen | |
| 2016 | Search Party | | |
| 2018 | RuPaul's Drag Race (season 10) | Herself, Guest | |
| 2018 | Saturday Night Live | GP-Yasss skit | |
| 2018–2021 | Pose | Veronica Ferocity (12 episodes) | |
| 2019 | Full Frontal with Samantha Bee | Drag Queen | |
| 2020–2025 | Translation | Co-Host | |
| 2021 | CNN Philippines | Herself (guest) | |
| 2021 | RuPaul's Drag Race All Stars (season 6) | Contestant (12th place) | |
| 2021 | RuPaul's Drag Race: Untucked | Contestant (12th place) | |
| 2021 | Good Morning America | Herself (guest) | |
| 2022–2025 | Drag Race Philippines | Herself (judge) | |

=== Music videos ===
| Year | Title | Artist | Ref. |
|---|---|---|---|
| 2011 | "Go Off" | Sahara Davenport | |
| 2011 | "Hot Couture" | Manila Luzon | |
| 2012 | "Queen" | Xelle | |
| 2017 | "Yet Another Dig" | Bob the Drag Queen | |
| 2017 | "Let It Snow" | Christmas Queens | |
| 2018 | "Fckboi" | Herself | |
| 2018 | "I Don't Give a F*ck" | Herself | |
| 2018 | "All This Body" | Herself | |
| 2021 | "Gummy Bear" | Ginger Minj | |
| 2022 | "Angle" | Willow Pill | |

=== Web series ===
| Year | Title | Role | Notes | Ref. |
|---|---|---|---|---|
| 2014 | Ring My Bell | Herself | Guest | |
| 2016 | Fashion Photo RuView | Herself | Guest Co-host | |
| 2016 | How to Makeup | Herself | Guest | |
| 2016–2018 | Hey Qween! | Herself | Guest; 2 episodes | |
| 2018 | Spillin' the Tea | Herself | Co-host | |
| 2019 | Reading Queens | Herself | Guest | |
| 2019 | Drag Queen Video Dates | Herself | Guest | |
| 2019 | Bootleg Opinions | Herself | Guest | |
| 2021 | Whatcha Packin' | Herself | Guest | |
| 2021 | Drag Queen Makeup Tutorial | Herself | Guest | |
| 2022 | Binge Queens | Herself | RuPaul's Drag Race: UK series 4 | |
| 2023 | Bring Back My Girls | Herself | | |

== See also ==
- Drag culture in New York City
- Filipinos in the New York metropolitan area
- LGBTQ culture in New York City
- List of LGBTQ people from New York City
- Transgender culture of New York City
- Transgender representation in the Drag Race franchise
