= Jaremi Carey =

American actor, streamer, singer, cosplay artist, and former drag performer

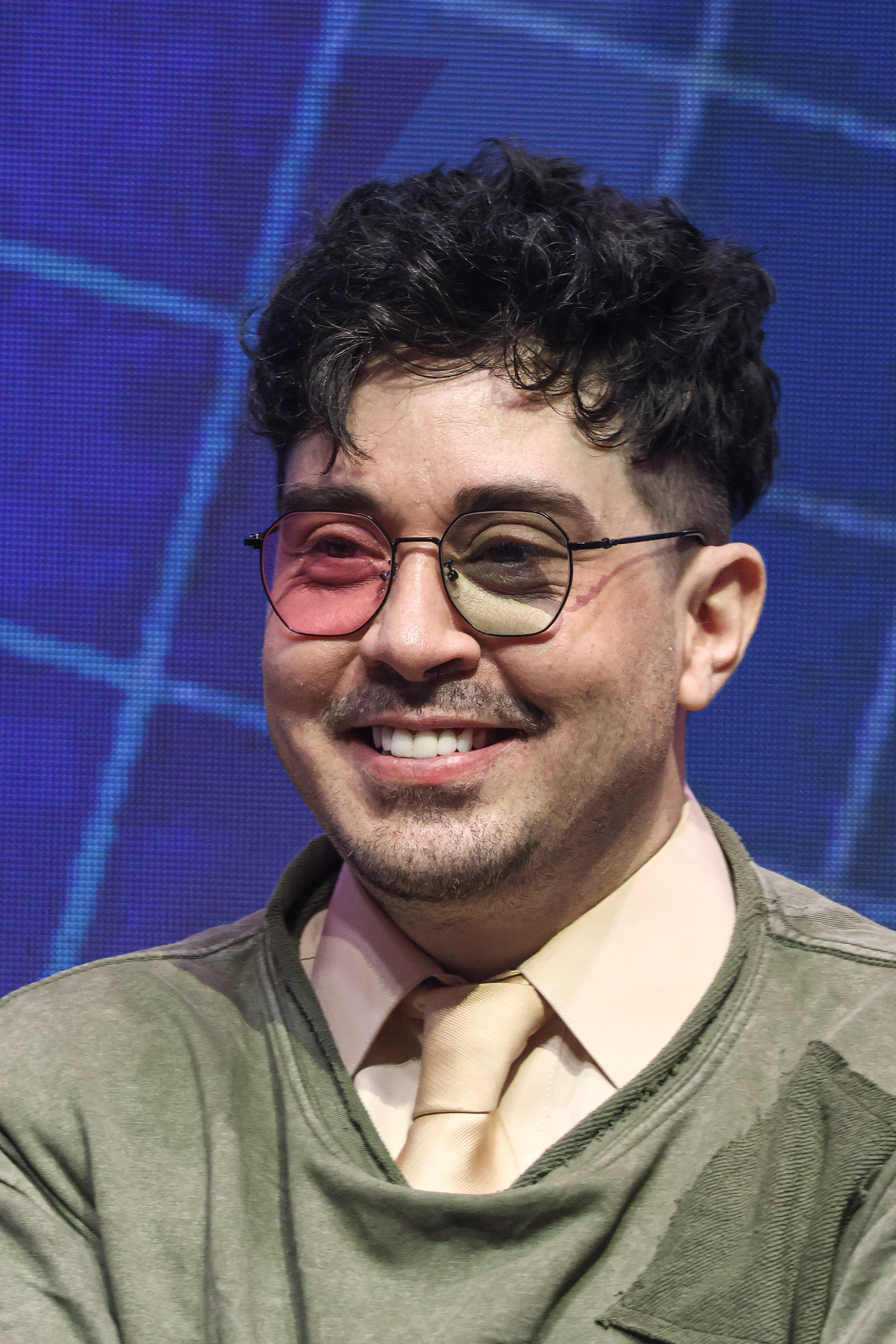
- Carey in 2026
- Born: Jeremy Lee Carey; October 10, 1985 (age 41); San Antonio, Texas, U.S.
- Occupations: Drag performer; musician; actor; cosplayer
- Years active: 2004–present
- Known for: RuPaul's Drag Race (season 4); RuPaul's Drag Race All Stars (season 2)
- Musical career
- Genres: Pop; R&B; soul; Dance
- Instrument: Vocals
- Label: Producer Entertainment Group

Jaremi Lee Carey (born Jeremy Lee Carey; October 10, 1985) is an American actor, streamer, singer, cosplay artist, and former drag performer who performed under the name Phi Phi O'Hara. In the O'Hara persona, Carey came to international attention as a runner-up on the 4th season of RuPaul's Drag Race and placing 7th on the second season of RuPaul's Drag Race: All Stars.

== Early life ==
Carey was born to Rickey Lee Carey and Rhonda Lynn Malott on October 10, 1985, in San Antonio, Texas. His parents divorced when he was 17 years old. He is of Filipino and Portuguese descent.

== Career ==
Carey as Phi Phi O'Hara was announced as one of the thirteen contestants for RuPaul's Drag Race season 4 on November 13, 2011. He achieved a runner-up position. In 2012, Carey was invited back as a contestant on All Stars 1, but declined to participate in the competition for personal reasons. He came back for All Stars 2 in 2016 and initially made it to the top five, but after the return of two previously eliminated contestants, Alyssa Edwards and Tatianna in the fifth episode, he placed seventh overall after being eliminated by them. He has been featured in music videos for "Stranger" by Chris Malinchak, "Battle Axe" by Sharon Needles, "Ratchet Christmas" by Jiggly Caliente, and "I Call Shade" by Trinity the Tuck.

Carey made news headlines across the web with a project called "365 Days of Drag". His original goal was to post one photo in drag every day of 2016 (except for February 29, since it was a leap year). Carey successfully completed all 365 looks, posting the final look on January 1, 2017. The final outfit was a gown made of hundreds of printed photographs that featured all of the looks from the series. In 2017, Carey organized a drag benefit show to raise funds for the victims of Hurricane Maria in Puerto Rico, which featured other Drag Race alumni. The event took place on November 6, 2017, in Minneapolis and raised over $80,000. In October 2019, Carey successfully completed another photo series called "31 Days of Wizardry". Each day he transformed himself into a different character from the Harry Potter universe.

As of April 2025, Carey is a co-chair of national organization Drag Out the Vote, which works with drag performers to promote voting among the LGBT community.

Carey has been releasing music as Phi Phi O'Hara since 2014, but he started performing under his real name as well in 2015. His debut album Fever Heart was released on October 14, 2016. He is featured in the first three volumes of the Christmas Queens albums with "O Come, All Ye Faithful" (2017), "Fireside" (2016), and "Naughty or Nice" (2015). In 2018, Carey recorded a duet with Jiggly Caliente for her album T.H.O.T. Process called "Beat of My City".

In 2020, Jaremi joined the Twitch Community as an LGBT+ Gameplayer. There he plays games like Dead by Daylight, Animal Crossing, Pokémon, Sims, Overwatch, or Just Chats with his fans. His previous username was ThePocketGay, but in August 2020 he changed his Twitter and Twitch usernames to JustJaremi and tweeted that "There is no more Phi Phi <3".

Carey is a certified optician.

== Personal life ==
In 2017, Carey married his longtime boyfriend Mikhael Ortega.

== Filmography ==
=== Film ===
Year	Title	Role	Notes
2019	The Queens	Himself	Documentary

=== Television ===
Year	Title	Role	Notes
2012	RuPaul's Drag Race	Contestant	Runner-up (Season 4)
2012	RuPaul's Drag Race: Untucked	Contestant	Runner-up (Season 4)
2016	Skin Wars	Guest	Season 3, Episode 4
2016	RuPaul's Drag Race All Stars	Contestant	7th place (Season 2)
2018	Celebrity Big Brother's Bit on the Side	Guest	
2019	The Boulet Brothers' Dragula	Guest Judge	Season 3, Episode 1
2015, 2019	Watch What Happens Live with Andy Cohen	Guest	

=== Theatre ===
Year	Title	Role	Theatre
2016	The Rocky Horror Show	Columbia	Josephine Theatre
2019	Femlins	Greta Stripe	Castro Theatre

=== Web series ===
Year	Title	Ref.
2013	Transformations	
2014	Couple$ for Ca$h	
2015	The After Show (with Alaska)	
2016	Hey Qween!	
2019	Bootleg Opinions (with Yuhua Hamasaki)	
2020	A Sip with Vodka	

=== Music videos ===
Year	Title	Artist	Ref.
2012	"Glamazon"	RuPaul	
2013	"Knew You Seemed Shady"	Pandora Boxx	
2014	"Stranger"	Chris Malinchak	
2014	"Bitchy"	Jaremi Carey	
2015	"Ratchet Christmas"	Jiggly Caliente	
2016	"Play"	Jaremi Carey	
2016	"All Mine"	Jaremi Carey	
2017	"Battle Axe"	Sharon Needles	
2019	"I Call Shade"	Trinity the Tuck	

== Discography ==
=== Albums ===
Year	Title
2016	Fever Heart

=== Singles ===
==== As lead artist ====
Year	Title
2014	"Bitchy"
2015	"Queen of Clubs"
2015	"Take Control"
2016	"Play"
2016	"All Mine"

==== As featured artist ====
Year	Title	Album
2015	"GAG" (Jonathan Hernandez feat. Jaremi Carey & Cory Wade)	non-album single
2018	"Beat of My City" (Jiggly Caliente feat. Jaremi Carey)	T.H.O.T. Process

== See also ==
- Filipinos in the New York metropolitan area
- LGBTQ culture in New York City
- List of LGBTQ people from New York City
