= Bob the Drag Queen =

American drag queen, comedian, and musician

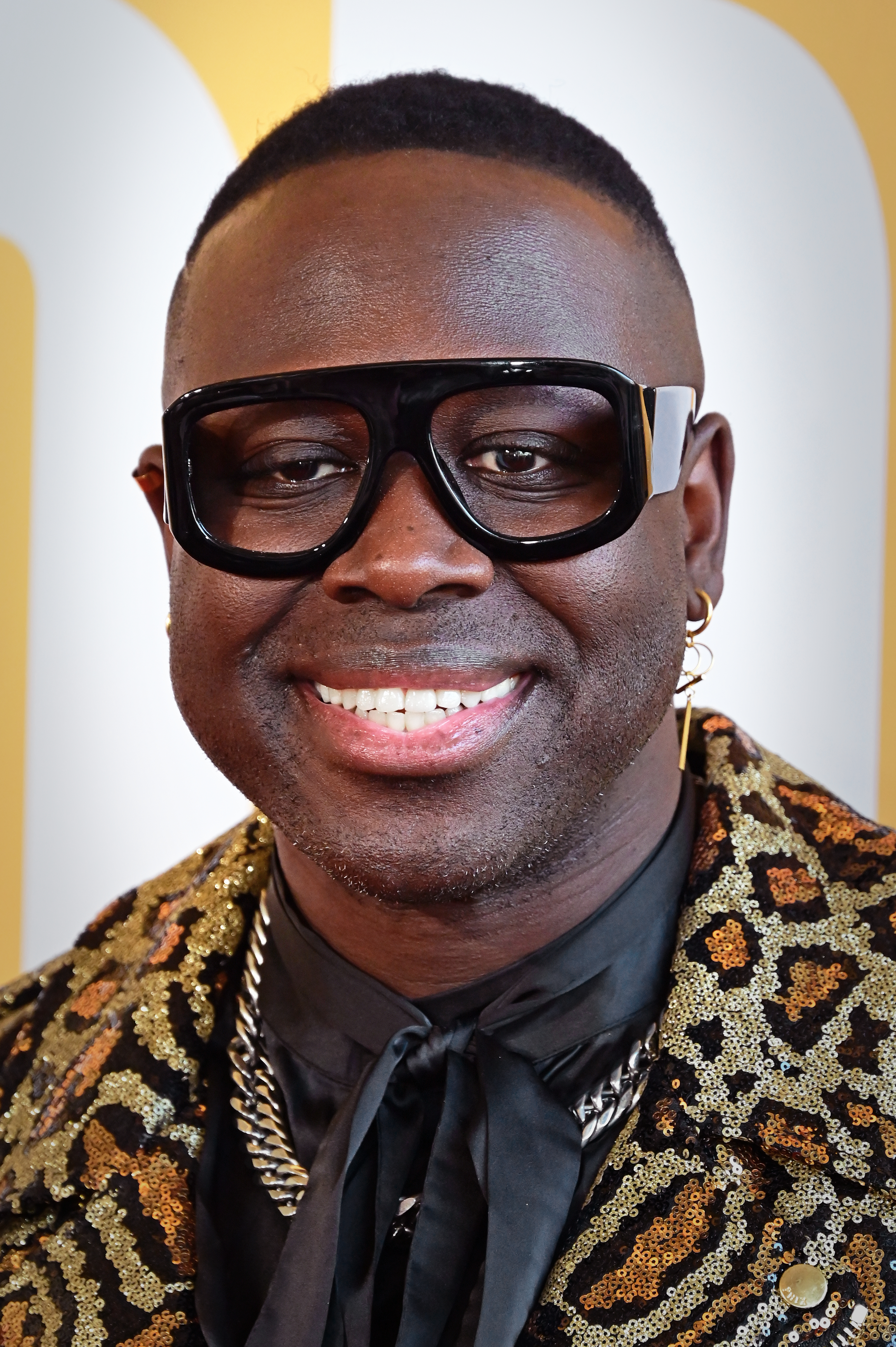
- Bob the Drag Queen in 2026
- Born: Christopher Delmar Caldwell; June 22, 1986 (age 40); Columbus, Georgia, U.S.
- Other names: Caldwell Tidicue; Kittin Withawhip
- Education: Columbus State University
- Occupation: Drag queen
- Years active: 2009–present
- Known for: Winning RuPaul's Drag Race (season 8) and being Master of Ceremonies for Madonna's The Celebration Tour
- Website: bobthedragqueen.com

Christopher Delmar Caldwell (born June 22, 1986), also known by his (Note: Bob is non-binary and uses both he and she personal pronouns. This article uses he for consistency.) stage name Caldwell Tidicue and better known by his drag name Bob the Drag Queen, is an American drag queen, comedian, actor, activist, musician, author, podcaster, and reality television personality. He is best known for winning season eight of RuPaul's Drag Race. After Drag Race, he pursued acting, appearing in television shows such as High Maintenance (2016), Tales of the City (2019), and A Black Lady Sketch Show (2019). In 2020, he co-hosted We're Here on HBO alongside fellow Drag Race contestants Eureka O'Hara and Shangela. His debut novel, Harriet Tubman: Live in Concert, was published in 2025. As of 2026, he is the first Black RuPaul's Drag Race competitor to hit over 2 million Instagram followers.

== Early life ==
Christopher Delmar Caldwell was born to Martha Caldwell on June 22, 1986 in Columbus, Georgia. His last name, "Caldwell", was later incorporated into the professional name "Caldwell Tidicue". (Note: "Tidicue" is a play-on-words: it sounds like "T.D.Q.", which is short for "The Drag Queen".) He moved often as a kid, including Phenix City, Alabama; Corinth, Mississippi; LaGrange, Georgia; and Atlanta, Georgia. He was raised in Clayton County, Georgia. Caldwell explained, "You can call it the hood. You can say it. That's where I'm from."

He first got introduced to drag by his mother. Martha owned a drag bar in Columbus, Georgia. On the nights that she could not afford a babysitter, she brought Caldwell to the drag bar, where he would work and collect money from the patrons. One of Martha's friends, Sydney, who was a bartender at the club, was shot by a drag queen.

Caldwell has described his mother as a supportive early influence on his life. He explained, "I also grew up with a mom who told me I could do anything, so I was like, 'Y'all don't even know how amazing I am.' My mom was one of the moms who was like, 'You are so handsome why aren't you modeling? I am handsome, but model... let's not get crazy." Bob has also been influenced by several other drag queens, such as Peppermint, Bianca Del Rio, BeBe Zahara Benet, and his Sibling Rivalry co-host Monét X Change.

As a teenager, Caldwell attended Morrow High School in Morrow, Georgia. He then went back to Columbus to study theater at Columbus State University before dropping out at 21. In college, Caldwell's roommates robbed a bank and multiple convenience stores and businesses, leading the FBI to search his residence. Two of his roommates were also involved in a shootout at a Columbus mall. He first appeared in drag when he attended a lesbian party during Pride Month in 2008.

When Caldwell was 22 years old, he moved to Queens, New York, with $500 and two suitcases. He originally intended to be on Broadway and become an actor and standup comedian. Later in life, he also lived in Upper West Side, New York around 2013 and Washington Heights, Manhattan as of 2020. Before becoming a drag queen, Caldwell worked in children's theater for years, and "always found children to be a source of joy for [him]."

Her drag mother is Peaches Christ.

== Career ==
=== Drag career beginnings ===
In the summer of 2009, Caldwell started doing drag, after watching the first season of RuPaul's Drag Race on TiVo. He explained that he "became obsessed" with the show and it immediately inspired him to order a TK-7 makeup kit from the Ben Nye website. Since his first presentations, his character was focused on stand-up comedy routines, and he started lip-syncing after a couple of months into his drag. His initial stage name was Kittin Withawhip, which was a reference to Kitten with a Whip (1964), a film that starred Ann-Margret. He was featured in Leland Bobbé's Half Drag Series with his name. In his early drag career, Caldwell would perform with a nine-foot bullwhip.

In the beginning of his career, Caldwell faced challenges as a drag queen. As he described, "It did not make me money or get me gigs. It cost me a lot. I did this competition every Thursday. Then another one on Wednesday. And another on Tuesday. I never won any of them. Ever. After a few years, I finally won one. It was really addictive and fun doing competitions."

In 2013, Caldwell officially changed his stage name to Bob the Drag Queen. As he explained, at a karaoke hosting gig, "The guy goes, 'Give it up for your host... Kate. But she made light of the moment, reintroducing herself as 'Kate the Drag Queen,' then 'Kim the Drag Queen' throughout the evening. Then at the end of the night, I was like, 'Give it up for... Bob the Drag Queen.' And I was like, 'That sounds really funny.'"

=== RuPaul's Drag Race Season 8 ===
On February 1, 2016, Bob the Drag Queen was revealed as a cast member on the eighth season of RuPaul's Drag Race. On the show, he was noted for his focus on comedy. During the show, he won three challenges, including the recurring "Snatch Game" (where he portrayed Crazy Eyes, as played by Uzo Aduba, and Carol Channing). On the season's eighth episode, Bob "lipsynced for her life" against her rival Derrick Barry and won. On May 16, 2016, Bob was crowned the winner of the season and received a cash prize of $100,000. He was crowned America’s Next Drag Superstar.

In June 2019, a panel of judges from New York magazine placed Bob eighth on their list of "the most powerful drag queens in America", a ranking of 100 former Drag Race contestants.

=== Television and film ===
Following his victory on RuPaul's Drag Race in 2016, Caldwell expanded his career into acting and television. Later that year, he appeared in the comedy-drama series High Maintenance. Over the next three years, he also appeared in the 2019 Netflix miniseries Tales of the City and the sketch comedy series A Black Lady Sketch Show.

In 2020, Caldwell joined fellow RuPaul's Drag Race contestants Eureka O'Hara and Shangela as a co-host of the HBO reality series We're Here. In the series, the trio travel to small communities across the United States, recruiting local residents to participate in one-night-only drag shows while exploring LGBTQ issues and community acceptance. We're Here premiered on April 23, 2020. The series was subsequently renewed for second and third seasons. Five years later, in 2025, Caldwell competed on the third season of the American reality competition series The Traitors, where he was eliminated as one of the traitors. Beginning with the fourth season, he and fellow contestant Rob Mariano became co-hosts of The Traitors Official Podcast, providing weekly recaps of the series.

=== Music, podcasts and web series ===
In 2016, shortly after winning Drag Race, Bob released the single "Purse First" featuring DJ Mitch Ferrino. He also appeared in the music video for MC Frontalot's "Mornings Come and Go". In 2017, he collaborated with Alaska Thunderfuck on the single "Yet Another Dig", contributed to the compilation album Christmas Queens 3, and collaborated with Shangela for a Christmas theme song, "Deck a Ho". On March 15, 2018, Bob debuted the podcast Sibling Rivalry with his drag sister Monét X Change as co-host and produced by DJ Mitch Ferrino. On April 2, 2018, a video version of the podcast was uploaded to YouTube.

In July 2023, Bob appeared on the Dungeons & Dragons themed show Dungeons and Drag Queens, which was also the 18th season of the actual play anthology series Dimension 20 on Dropout. In 2025, she reprised her role in the second season of Dungeons and Drag Queens. She's also had guest appearances on other Dropout shows such as Dirty Laundry and Monét’s Slumber Party.

In January 2026, he cohosted The Traitors Official Podcast with Boston Rob to recap weekly episodes of the Emmy-winning Peacock reality competition.

=== Theatre and tours ===
Bob played the role of Belize in Berkeley Rep's production of Angels in America from April to July 2018. In March 2020, Bob performed alongside fellow drag race alumni BeBe Zahara Benet, The Vixen, Monique Heart, Peppermint, and Shea Couleé in the Nubia tour, a live drag show featuring and produced by Black drag queens. In 2022, Bob embarked on the co-headlining Sibling Rivalry Live! tour with Monét X Change. During the Celebration Tour, Madonna's twelfth world tour in 2023–2024, Bob served as an emcee, appearing during different moments of the show interacting with the singer.

In January 2026, Bob made their Broadway debut in Moulin Rouge! The Musical, which will run for 8 weeks at the Al Hirschfeld Theatre. He walked on stage purse first, which alludes to his new production company, Purse First. He announced his This Is Wild comedy special, which released on Hulu in January.

=== Activism and other ventures ===
Bob appeared as a guest co-host alongside Trixie Mattel on The Trixie & Katya Show, filling in for regular co-host Katya during her hiatus. Her TV comedy special, Bob the Drag Queen: Suspiciously Large Woman, aired on Logo in July 2017. In November 2019, Bob was interviewed by KMVT about a one-time drag event hosted in Twin Falls, a show highlighting local drag queens and introducing international drag talent to Magic Valley. This event was filmed as part of Tidicue's HBO show We're Here (2020). Bob is a co-founder of Black Queer Town Hall along with Peppermint. The inaugural event featured speakers such as Laverne Cox and Angela Davis and raised over $150,000. In May 2021, Bob was featured in Coach New York's "Pride is Where You Find It" campaign. Bob is an LGBT activist and spoke on RuPaul's Drag Race of a moment when he was protesting for LGBT rights and was arrested in drag.

Bob is the drag mother of Miz Cracker and drag sister to Monét X Change, who placed fifth and sixth, respectively, on season 10 of RuPaul's Drag Race, with X Change going on to win RuPaul's Drag Race All Stars season 4 and Cracker placing as runner-up on RuPaul's Drag Race All Stars season 5.

In October 2024, it was announced that his debut novel, Harriet Tubman: Live in Concert, would be published in March 2025. The novel's premise is that historical figures have returned from the dead, including Harriet Tubman who uses hip hop to tell her story and advocate for freedom. The novel landed on The New York Times Best Seller list.

In June 2025, he launched his production company, Purse First Studios.

== Personal life ==
Bob is polyamorous, pansexual and non-binary and goes by either he/him or she/her pronouns. He was previously in a relationship with Ezra Michel. As of January 2023, Bob has been sober for 14 years. Bob is red–green colorblind, which affects his outfit choices. As of 2024, he lives in Los Angeles. In November 2025, he got a hair transplant.

His mother, Martha Caldwell, died on Mother's Day in 2024.

He was featured in 2025 Out100. In 2026, he became the first Black drag race contestant to hit 2 million followers on Instagram.

== Discography ==
=== Extended plays ===
Title	EP Details
Gay Barz	Released: February 10, 2023; Label: Self-released; Formats: Digital download, streaming

=== Singles ===
==== As lead artist ====
Title	Year	Peak chart positions	Album
Title	Year	US Dance	Album
"Purse First" (featuring DJ Mitch Ferrino)	2016	43	Non-album singles
"Bloodbath" (featuring DJ Mitch Ferrino)	2016	—	Non-album singles
"Yet Another Dig" (featuring Alaska Thunderfuck 5000)	2017	—	Non-album singles
"Deck a Ho" (Mitch Ferrino Remix) (featuring Shangela)	2017	—	Non-album singles
"The Most Office" (with Peppermint featuring DJ Mitch Ferrino)	2020	—	Non-album singles
"Bitch Like Me"	2022	—	Gay Barz
"Black" (featuring Basit and Ocean Kelly)	2022	—	Gay Barz

==== As featured artist ====
Title	Year	Album
"Soak It Up" (Monét X Change featuring Bob the Drag Queen)	2018	Non-album single

=== Other appearances ===
Title	Year	Other artist(s)	Album	Ref.
"Wrong Bitch"	2016	Todrick Hall	Straight Outta Oz	
"Sandra Claus"	2017	—N/a	Christmas Queens 3	

== Filmography ==
=== Television ===
Year	Title	Role	Notes	Ref.
2016	RuPaul's Drag Race	Himself (Contestant)	Season 8, Winner	
2016	RuPaul's Drag Race: Untucked	Himself		
2016	High Maintenance	Darnel	HBO premiere episode, "Meth(od)"	
2017	Playing House	Himself	Episode: "Reverse the Curse"	
2017	RuPaul's Drag Race	Himself	Season 9, Episode 14	
2017	Bob the Drag Queen: Suspiciously Large Woman	Himself	Television Comedy Special	
2018	The Trixie & Katya Show	Host	Co-host with Trixie Mattel, filling in for Katya	
2018	RuPaul's Drag Race	Himself (Guest)	Season 10, Episode 1	
2019–2022	A Black Lady Sketch Show	Ball Emcee	2 episodes	
2019	Tales of the City	Ida Best	Recurring Role	
2019	Bob The Drag Queen: Crazy Black Lady	Himself	Television Comedy Special	
2020	RuPaul's Celebrity Drag Race	Himself (mentor)	RuPaul's Drag Race Spin-Off	
2020–2022	We're Here	Himself	HBO series, Season 1–3	
2021	A Little Late with Lilly Singh	Himself	Guest	
2021	The Sherry Vine Show	Himself	Guest	
2021	CBS This Morning	Himself	Guest	
2021	Lucifer	Busty Bazoongas/Brian	Guest	
2021	The Boulet Brothers' Dragula	Himself	Guest judge	
2022	Legendary	Herself	Guest judge	
2022	Stand Out: An LGBTQ+ Celebration	Himself	Co-Host	
2022	Trixie Motel	Herself	Guest	
2022	Craig of the Creek	Nicole's Ducci Bag (voice)	Episode: "Back to Cool"	
2023	The Simpsons	Himself (voice)	Episode: "My Life as a Vlog"	
2024	Hell's Kitchen	Himself	Guest diner; Episode: "#HellishHangover"	
2024	RuPaul's Drag Race All Stars (season 9)	Himself	Special guest; Episode: "The National Drag Convention Roast"	
2024	Doctor Odyssey	Marsha D'Penguins	Season 1, Episode 7, credited as Caldwell Tidicue	
2025	The Traitors	Himself	Season 3, Eliminated; 18th Place	
2025	CBS Mornings	Himself	Guest	
2026	All’s Fair	To be confirmed.	Season 2	

=== Film ===
Year	Title	Role	Notes	Ref.
2017	Rough Night	Himself	DJ	
2017	Cherry Pop	Kitten		
2018	A Queen for the People	Himself	Documentary	
2019	The Queens	Himself	Documentary	
2019	Trixie Mattel: Moving Parts	Himself	Documentary	
2020	Live at Caroline's	Himself	Comedy special	
2021	One Week 'Till Doomsday	Himself	Documentary	
2023	We Have a Ghost	Himself	Cameo	
2023	Woke Man in a Dress	Himself	Comedy Special	

=== Audio series ===
Year	Title	Role	Ref.
2019	Heads Will Roll	Remy	

=== Web series ===
Year	Title	Role	Notes	Ref.
2016	RuPaul's Drag Race: Untucked	Himself	Companion show to RuPaul's Drag Race	
2016-2019	Bobbin' Around	Himself	Co-Host	
2017	Bestie$ for Ca$h	Himself	Guest, with Luis Alvarez	
2018	Drag Babies	Himself	Host	
2018	Cosmo Queens	Himself	Guest	
2019	The X Change Rate	Himself	Hosted by Monet X Change	
2019	Portrait of a Drag Queen	Himself	Guest, episode 4	
2019	Drag My Dad	Himself	Host	
2020–22	The Pit Stop	Himself	Season 12, All Stars 5 and 7 Host	
2020	Gayme Show	Himself	Guest judge	
2020	The Marti Report	Himself	Guest	
2021	In the Dollhouse With Lina	Himself	Guest	
2021	What's My Game?	Himself	Guest	
2021	Beyond the Binary	Himself	Guest	
2021	Coach Conversations	Himself	Co-host	
2022	Game Changer	Himself	Guest	
2023	Lucky Lyft	Himself	Host	
2023	Dirty Laundry	Himself	Episode: "Who Came Out to Their High School Girlfriend Via Jesus Christ?"	
2023, 2025	Dimension 20: Dungeons and Drag Queens	Gertrude	Main role; 10 episodes	
2023, 2025	Dimension 20's Adventuring Party	Himself	Companion show to Dimension 20	
2024	Monét's Slumber Party	Himself	Guest	

=== Podcasts ===
Year	Title	Role	Notes	Ref.
2014	Feast of Fun	Guest	2 episodes	
2015	Haus of Mimosa: The Podcast	Guest	Episode: "Pride Edition with Bob the Drag Queen"	
2016	Cooking with Drag Queens	Guest	Episode: "African Peanut Curry w/ Tofu, Purple Potatoes & Naan Bread"	
2016	The Michelle Meow Show	Guest	Episode: "May 22, 2016"	
2016	Out N Out Talk	Guest	Season 2 Episode 24	
2016, 2018	The Cooler	Guest	2 episodes	
2017	2 Dope Queens	Guest	Episode: "I Hated It"	
2017	RuPaul: What's the Tee?	Guest	Episode: "Bob the Drag Queen"	
2018	Series of Fortunate Events	Guest	Episode: "Suspiciously Large Woman"	
2018–present	Sibling Rivalry	Co-host	With Monét X Change; Studio71 production	
2019	Conversations with People Who Hate Me	Guest	Episode: "Bob the Drag Queen"	
2019	Cooking By Ear	Guest	Episode: "Bob the Drag Queen and Vegan Soup"	
2019	Living with Shangela	Guest	Episode: "World Pride Revue: Bob the Drag Queen, Alaska, Yvie Oddly, Alyssa Edwards and More!"	
2019	Inside the Closet	Guest	4 episodes	
2019–2020	Ask Me Another	Guest	2 episodes	
2020	Chosen Family	Guest	Episode: "Purse First with Bob the Drag Queen"	
2020	All of It	Guest	Episode: "Bob the Drag Queen, Coming to a Small Town Near You"	
2020	Straight Talk with Ross Mathews	Guest	Episode: "Shangela, Bob the Drag Queen and Eureka"	
2020	The Big Ticket with Marc Malkin	Guest	Episode: "Shangela, Bob the Drag Queen and Eureka O'Hara"	
2020	Homophilia	Guest	Episode: "Bob the Drag Queen"	
2020	Marti Talks	Guest	Episode: "Bob the Drag Queen"; The Only Productions production	
2020	Seth Rudetsky's Back to School	Guest	Episode: "Bob the Drag Queen"	
2020	Stuck at Home with Cliff and Jason	Guest	Episode: "We're Here with Bob the Drag Queen"	
2020	Scissoring Isn't a Thing	Guest	Episode: "Bob the Drag Queen"	
2020	On the Rocks: Where Celebrities and Cocktails Mix	Guest	Episode: "Bob the Drag Queen"	
2020	Why Here	Guest	Episode: Bob the Drag Queen"	
2020	Metrosource Minis	Guest	Episode: "Bob the Drag Queen"	
2020	Why Won't You Date Me? with Nicole Byer	Guest	Episode: "Black History Year"	
2020	The Conversation	Guest	Episode: "Bob the Drag Queen & Jason Harrow"	
2020	Doing Great with Vicky Vox	Guest	Episode: "I Like All Dicks"	
2020	Just the Sip	Guest	Episode: "Bob the Drag Queen Is Here for a Major Kiki"	
2020	BuzzFeed Daily	Guest	Episode: "Bob the Drag Queen"	
2020	Best Friends with Nicole Byer and Sasheer Zamata	Guest	Episode: "Sasheer Doesn't Think That Birds Are That Hard"	
2020	Keep It!	Guest	Episode: "Black Is Queen"	
2020	Words & Music	Guest	Episode: "Bob the Drag Queen"	
2020	Poptarts	Guest	Episode: "Bob the Drag Queen!"	
2020	Headstrong	Guest	2 episodes	
2020	The OutCast	Guest	Episode: "We're Here - Bob the Drag Queen, Shangela, and Eureka O'Hara"	
2020	Las Culturistas	Guest	Episode: "Barracuda Nights"	
2020	Double Threat with Julie Klausner & Tom Scharpling	Guest	Episode: "Physician, Heal Thyself"	
2020	American Influencer Real Talk	Guest	Episode: "Bob the Drag Queen"	
2020	Alec Mapa: Hot Mess	Guest	Episode: "Bob the Drag Queen: Politics, Drag, and Race Relations"	
2020	Internet Insanity	Guest	Episode: "Bob the Drag Queen"; The Only Productions production	
2020	Hardcore Humanism with Dr. Mike	Guest	Episode: "Bob the Drag Queen"	
2020	Just Between Us	Guest	Episode: "Political Drag with Bob the Drag Queen, Disclosing Your Bipolar Diagnosis and Cognitive Dissonance"	
2020	In the Envelope: The Actor's Podcast	Guest	Episode: "Bob the Drag Queen"	
2020	Not Too Deep with Grace Helbig	Guest	Episode: "Bob the Drag Queen - We're Here"	
2020	Wish U Were Weird with Sarah Rachel Lazarus	Guest	Episode: "Wish We Could Walk Into the Room Purse First"	
2020	Pepp Talks: Black Movie Classics	Guest	2 episodes	
2020	The Bald the Beautiful with Trixie Mattel and Katya Zamo	Guest	Episode: "A Dainty 6'2" with Bob the Drag Queen"	
2020	Sloppy Seconds with Big Dipper & Meatball	Guest	Episode: "Koolickles"	
2020	Good Morning, Sodomites!	Guest	2 episodes	
2020	Brad Behavior	Guest	Episode: "Bob the Drag Queen"	
2020-2021	The Blaque Tea	Guest	2 episodes	
2020-2021	Race Chaser with Alaska and Willam	Guest	2 episodes	
2021	Behind the Velvet Rope	Guest	Episode: "Bob the Drag Queen (Drag Race Winner Tells All)"	
2021	Greatest Music of All Time Podcast	Guest	Episode: "Bob the Drag Queen"	
2021	Hot Takes & Deep Dives	Guest	Episode: "Interview w/ Bob the Drag Queen: Drag Race's Reigning Stand-Up Comedian"	
2021	Unhappy Hour with Matt Bellassai	Guest	Episode: "Covidiots"	
2021	Sean L. Show	Guest	Episode: "I Didn't Know This Was a Kinky Podcast"	
2021	Core Issues with Corey Andrew	Guest	Episode: "Bob the Drag Queen Shares His Success Story of Drag Stardom"	
2021	Cobi Kremer: Road to Recovery	Guest	Episode: "Recovery Is NOT a Drag"	
2021	Pour the Tea with Tis & Nates	Guest	Episode: "Bob the Drag Queen vs Christian Walker"	
2021	Black Folx	Guest	Episode: "Policing Someone's Dating Life Is Problematic"	
2021	The Salon with Lala Milan	Guest	Episode: "Work Smart Not Hard"	
2021	Good Judy	Guest	Episode: "Bob the Drag Queen"	
2021	Friends of Dorothy	Guest	Episode: "Bob the Drag Queen on Mistaken Identities & Reddit Trolls"	
2021	The Tight Rope	Guest	Episode: "Bob the Drag Queen, RuPaul's Drag Race Winner on 'Non-Conformity' in the Black Community"	
2021	This Fat Girl Life	Guest	Episode: "My Interview with Bob the Drag Queen"	
2021	Say Yas to the Guest	Guest	Episode: "Bob the Drag Queen - Winning with Authenticity"	
2021	Movies & Me	Guest	Episode: "Bob the Drag Queen on the Power of Drag, the Importance of Pride, & Creating "Bob Land""	
2021	Lemonade & Tea	Guest	Episode: "Juneteenth"	
2021	I Weigh with Jameela Jamil	Guest	Episode: "Bob the Drag Queen"	
2021	The Carlos Watson Show	Guest	Episode: "Bob the Drag Queen"	
2021	Hi Jinkx!	Guest	Episode: "Bob the Drag Queen"	
2021	I'm 40% Podcast	Guest	Episode: "Fear of a Bot Planet"	
2021	Celeb vs Superfan	Guest	Episode: "Bob the Drag Queen vs Joia"	
2021	Gooplah	Guest	Episode: "We're Back and We're Here with Bob the Drag Queen!"	
2021	Small Doses with Amanda Seales	Guest	Episode: "Side Effects of Drag"	
2021	Wanna Be On Top? with Shea Couleé	Guest	Episode: "Cycle 4: "Be Quiet Tiffany""	
2021	Queery with Cameron Esposito	Guest	Episode: "Bob the Drag Queen"	
2021	Fake the Nation	Guest	Episode: "Artificially Enhanced Camels"	
2022	Exposed: Dragged Out	Guest	Episode: "Ringlets Flowing Over the Shoulder"	
2022	Hardcore SobrieTEA	Guest	Episode: "Bob the Drag Queen"	
2022	The Table Is Ours	Guest	Episode: "Bob the Drag Queen: Hulture, That's Hustle Culture"	
2022	Dating Games	Guest	Episode: "I've Just Been Vague and Confusing to People Ever Since"	
2022	Dear Chelsea	Guest	Episode: "You're Lucky to Have Me"	
2022	Couples Therapy	Guest	Episode: "Bob the Drag Queen"	
2022	Death, Sex and Money	Guest	Episode: "Knock Knock, Who's There? Bob the Drag Queen"	
2022	Lovett or Leave It	Guest	2 episodes	
2023	Beyond the Scenes from The Daily Show	Guest	Episode: "The Queer History of Drag"	
2023	Very Delta	Guest	Episode: "Are You the Drag Queen Like Me?"	
2023	I'm Literally Screaming	Guest	Episode: "Theories on the Afterlife"	
2023–present	Town Hall: A Black Queer Podcast	Co-host	With Peppermint; Studio71 production	
2024	So True with Caleb Hearon	Guest	Episode: Bob The Drag Queen Loves a Downfall	
2025	Smosh Mouth	Guest	Episode: Bob The Drag Queen Loves Zendaya	
2026	Royal Court	Guest	Episode: Bob The Drag Queen Joins Brittany Broski's Royal Court	

=== Music videos ===
==== As lead artist or director ====
Year	Title	Credited as		Notes	Ref(s)
Year	Title	Lead artist	Director	Notes	Ref(s)
2016	"Purse First"	Yes	No		
2016	"Bloodbath"	Yes	No		
2017	"Yet Another Dig" (featuring Alaska Thunderfuck)	Yes	No		
2019	"Super Queen Remix" (with Thorgy Thor)	Yes	No	Unofficial remix of "Super Queen" by RuPaul	
2020	"The Most Office"	Yes	No		
2021	"Girl Baby"	No	Yes	Credited as director; artist credit to Ezra Michel	
2022	"Bitch Like Me"	Yes	No	Directed by Assaad Yacoub	
2022	"Black" (featuring Ocean Kelly and Basit)	Yes	No	Directed by Marvin Brown; credited as creative director	
2023	"BOOTY"	Yes	Yes		

Featured and cameo roles

Year	Title	Artist	Ref(s)
"The Realness"	2016	RuPaul featuring Eric Kupper	
"Straight Outta Oz"	2016	Todrick Hall featuring Bob the Drag Queen	
"Soak It Up"	2018	Monét X Change featuring Bob the Drag Queen	
"Scores"	2019	Kahanna Montrese	
"Mask, Gloves, Soap, Scrubs"	2020	Todrick Hall	

== Theatre ==
Year	Production	Role	Venue	Notes	Ref.
2017	Angels in America	Belize / Mr. Lies	Berkeley Repertory Theater	Credited as Caldwell Tidicue	
2026	Moulin Rouge! The Musical	Harold Zidler	Al Hirschfeld Theatre	Broadway	
2026	Jesus Christ Superstar	King Herod	Theatre Royal, Drury Lane	West End	

== Bibliography ==
=== Novel ===
Harriet Tubman: Live in Concert. Gallery Books. March 25, 2025. ISBN 9781668061978.

== Awards and nominations ==
=== Broadway.com Audience Choice Awards ===
Year	Category	Work	Result	Ref.
2026	Favorite Replacement (Male)	Moulin Rouge!	Pending	

=== GLAAD Media Awards ===
Year	Category	Work	Result	Ref.
2021	Outstanding Reality Program	We're Here	Won	
2022	Outstanding Reality Program	We're Here	Won (Note: tied with RuPaul's Drag Race)	
2023	Outstanding Reality Program	We're Here	Won	
2023	Outstanding Podcast	Sibling Rivalry	Won	
2024	Outstanding Podcast	Sibling Rivalry	Nominated	
2025	Outstanding Podcast	Sibling Rivalry	Nominated	

=== Peabody Awards ===
Year	Category	Work	Result	Ref.
2022	Entertainment	We're Here	Won	

=== Queerty Awards ===
Year	Category	Work	Result	Ref.
2020	Drag Royalty	Herself	Nominated	
2021	Podcast	Sibling Rivalry	Nominated	
2021	TV Series	We're Here	Runner-up	
2022	Reality/Docu-series	We're Here	Runner-up	
2022	Podcast	Sibling Rivalry	Nominated	
2023	Podcast	Sibling Rivalry	Won	
2023	Music Video	"Black"	Runner-up	
2023	Reality/Docu-series	We're Here	Runner-up	
2024	Badass	Herself	Nominated	
2025	Best Web Series	Dungeons and Drag Queens	Won	

=== Webby Awards ===
Year	Category	Work	Result	Ref.
2023	Podcasts - Diversity, Equity & Inclusion (People's Voice)	Sibling Rivalry	Nominated	

== See also ==
- Drag culture in New York City
- LGBTQ culture in New York City
- List of LGBTQ people from New York City
- NYC Drag March
- NYC Pride March
- Transgender culture in New York City
- RuPaul's Drag Race
- The Traitors (American TV series)

== Notes ==
Awards and achievements
Preceded by Violet Chachki	Winner of RuPaul's Drag Race; US season 8	Succeeded by Sasha Velour
