= Mikey Angelo =

American influencer and recording artist

- Angelo in 2026
- Born: Michael Angelo Junchaya; March 12, 1998 (age 28)
- Occupations: Influencer; recording artist

TikTok information
- Page: mrgrandeofficial
- Followers: 4.1 million
- Last updated: August 26, 2025

Michael Angelo Junchaya (born March 12, 1998), known professionally as Mikey Angelo, and Mr. Grande, is an American influencer and recording artist.

== Career ==
Angelo started making videos on YouTube in 2016. His first viral video was in 2020, with him rapping a fake Nicki Minaj verse on "Baby Shark". In May 2022, he went on The Today Show with Hoda Kotb and Jenna Bush Hager and rapped his own original Today Show theme song. In February 2023 he featured on Bob the Drag Queen's song "Gay Barz" alongside Kamera Tyme and Ocean Kelly. In January 2025 he re-capped January on The Tonight Show Starring Jimmy Fallon. In June 2025 he attended VidCon 2025's Meta Night Out.

== Discography ==
All credits adapted from Apple Music and Spotify.

=== As lead artist ===
==== Singles ====
Year	Title	Album	Writer(s)	Producer(s)
2025	"Kit Kat"	Non-album single	Michael Angelo Junchaya	No producer credited
2025	"Unfamiliar"	Non-album single	Michael Angelo Junchaya	No producer credited
2024	"The Wizard of Oz(empic)"	Non-album single	Michael Angelo Junchaya	No producer credited
2023	"Skeleton"	Non-album single	Michael Angelo Junchaya	No producer credited
2021	"My Pen Is"	Non-album single	Michael Angelo Junchaya	No producer credited
2021	"The Owl Song"	Non-album single	Michael Angelo Junchaya	No producer credited
2021	"Blame it on the Quarantine"	Non-album single	Michael Angelo Junchaya	No producer credited
2020	"Relax, We're Floating"	Non-album single	Michael Angelo Junchaya	No producer credited

=== As featured artist ===
==== Singles ====
Year	Title	Album	Writer(s)	Producer(s)
2023	"Gay Barz (Cypher)" (Bob the Drag Queen with Kamera Tyme, Mikey Angelo, and Ocean Kelly)	Gay Barz	Michael Junchaya, Camille Copeland, Christopher Caldwell, Ocean Kelly	Ocean Kelly
