= Laith Ashley =

Model, actor, activist, singer-songwriter, and entertainer

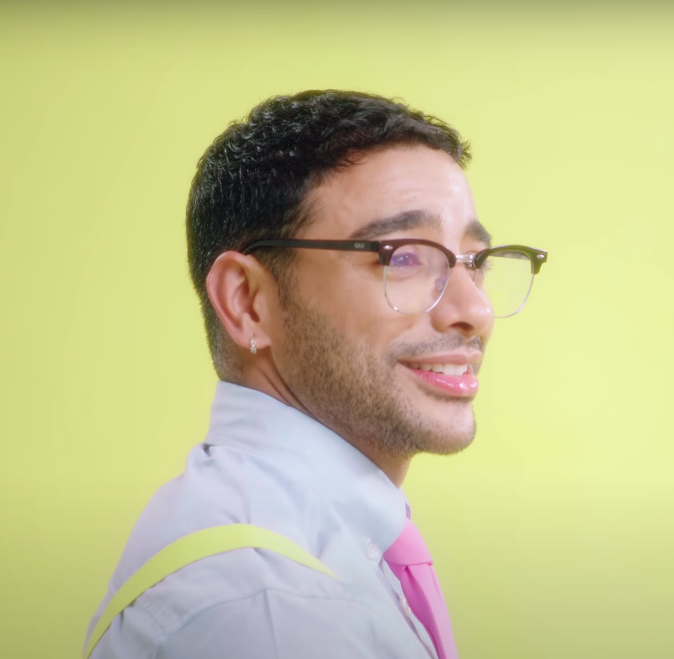
- Laith Ashley in the 2021 music video "Girl Baby" by Ezra Michel
- Born: July 6, 1989 (age 37); Harlem, NY, New York
- Occupations: Model, actor, singer-songwriter, activist
- Known for: Model

Laith Ashley De La Cruz (born July 6, 1989) is an American model, actor, activist, singer-songwriter, and entertainer of Dominican descent.

== Early life ==
Laith grew up in a Dominican American household in Harlem, New York. He practiced individual and team sports and by age 9 was already into boxing, baseball and particularly basketball, his preferred sport. He continued playing sports into high school, including competitively, sometimes in the boys' team. He was named the top athlete amongst both boys and girls by the school's athletic director. His father was Catholic and his mother a Pentecostal Christian, which influenced some of the attitudes held by family during his coming out.

First, Laith came out as homosexual when he was 17 years old, although he never called himself a lesbian. He explained, "Being assigned female at birth, I thought I was a lesbian, even though I hated the word.” Later, at age 19, he realized that he was transgender after watching videos produced by transgender people on YouTube. This prompted him to come out as a transgender man in 2013. Laith began medically transitioning in January 2014 with masculinizing hormone therapy. His voice deepened and he quickly grew a beard. Nine months later, he had a double mastectomy and adopted the name Laith (meaning "lion" in Arabic) having admired the works of Laith Hakeem.

Laith attended business school and studied psychology at Fairfield University in Connecticut. He subsequently worked at Callen-Lorde Community Health Center, where he worked with LGBT homeless youth as a social worker. He explained in an interview, "When I was a kid, I'd always wanted to be a performer, singer, dancer — but as a guy. But then, I didn't think it was possible. I did what my parents said: went to college, got a 9-to-5 job... and people would always tell me, 'You should model!'"

== Career ==
=== Modeling career ===
In January 2014, Laith began his transition process. Soon after, in 2015, Laith organized a photo shoot with a friend, and he posted the images on Instagram. The images caused viral attention, and many people posted negative comments. He was on the verge of deleting his Instagram account due to the negative comments, but Laverne Cox then reposted his images on her account. This helped inspire him to continue his online presence. Since that time, Laith has modeled for a variety of venues and campaigns, including Barneys (photographed by Bruce Weber), in Calvin Klein and in Diesel (shot by David LaChapelle) becoming the first-ever transgender man to be featured in a Diesel campaign. Laith Ashley has also appeared on the covers of renowned fashion and lifestyle publications including in British GQ, Vogue France, Out Magazine, Elle UK, Attitude UK Gay Times, FTM Magazine and Cassius, amongst others. In June 2016, Laith was featured in Attitude UK as the magazine's Summerwear and Underwear Special. He appeared in a number of fashion shows including the Gypsy Sport catwalk at New York Fashion Week and the Marco Marco Fashion Show at L.A. Style. He is represented by the Slay Model Management agency.

=== Acting and music career ===
In addition, Laith has done musical and television work. In 2016, Laith appeared in Strut, a television program about transgender models, which was produced by Whoopi Goldberg. In June 2018, Ashley performed his music, including his single "Can't Wait" at L.A. Pride. The bill included acts such as Jessica 6, Icona Pop, Keke Wyatt, Eve, Cece Peniston, Kim Petras, Jesse Saint John, Allie X, Gio Bravo, Karisma, and Saturn Rising. In September 2018, Ashley released a music video for his song "Before You Go". Furthermore, in 2018, Laith became the first transgender member of the Pit Crew in RuPaul's Drag Race. He appeared in the "Pants Down Bottoms Up" mini-challenge in Season 10. In 2019, he collaborated with Kay'Vion on the latter's album Braille releasing jointly the single "Favorite". In January 2023, he starred as the love interest in the Taylor Swift music video "Lavender Haze".

== Activism ==
Laith Ashley is an activist particularly in transgender issues. He worked with FLUX, a division of the AIDS Healthcare Foundation, which is dedicated to raising awareness and providing support to trans and gender-nonconforming people, actively takes part in Pride parades, and has talked on numerous occasions of the dangers of transphobia and visibility of ethnic minorities. He has also appeared in a great number of LGBTQ public awareness campaigns including a high-profile campaign by T-Mobile, the "We Are Bold" campaign by AT&T and GLAAD He has also talked about challenges of transitioning, about bullying, racism and very notably the visibility of transgender people in the modelling industry.

In a lengthy interview with The Huffington Post titled "I Am Trans, But It’s Not All I Am", Laith Ashley said he aspired to be more than just a transgender man. "I try to be open, more open than others may be. I try to think of it as a cis gender person who is looking at their gender as another other than their own, and if this is something they have never thought about or researched. It’s normal that they will have a lot of questions, it’s just how you ask them. You have to at least be sensitive. I think it’s important to talk about it but we want to let people know we are people just like everyone else. Don’t put us on display and under a spotlight and make it uncomfortable. I want to show everyone that yes I am trans, but its not all that I am. The same goes for all trans people. Everyone’s transition is their own; my story, my transition, my identity is my own. Everyone’s identity, trans or not, is their own... There are people that went male/female or female/male and people that are in between. I think before I was in the industry and working with the LGBT industry, I was very on the masculine spectrum; Now I feel more fluid."

== Filmography ==
=== Television ===
Date	Series	Role	Episode
2016	I Am Cait	Himself	Guest in the reality show / Docuseries in "Partner Up" episode
2016	Strut		6 episodes
2018	RuPaul's Drag Race	Model (in the Pit Crew)	"Breastworld"
2018	Pose	Sebastian	"Love Is the Message"
2019	LOGO	Himself	"Laith Ashley - The Heartthrob"

=== Music videos ===
Year	Title	Performer(s)	Album
2021	"Girl Baby"	Ezra Michel	
2023	"Lavender Haze"	Taylor Swift	Midnights

== Discography ==
=== Songs ===
- 2017: "Can't Wait"
- 2017: "Before You Go"
- 2019: "Like Me"

Featured in

- 2018: "Favorite" (Kay'Vion feat. Laith Ashley)
- 2021: "Every Morning" (Peppermint feat. Laith Ashley)

== Podcasts / Interviews ==
Date	Series	Episode
2017	Susanna Giménez	Interview on talk show Susanna Giménez (Episode 16.4)
Aug. 1, 2017	LGBTQ&A	"Laith Ashley: Everything is a Spectrum, Nothing is Binary"
Oct. 2, 2017	LatiNation	Report "Laith Ashley - Transgender Model & Singer; Inspiring and Educating"
Jan. 5, 2019	British GQ online	"Laith Ashley on transitioning and life as a model"
Jan. 29, 2018	Hollywood Unlocked	"Laith Ashley opens up about his transition from a woman to a man"
