= Arisce Wanzer =

American model

- Born: Woodbridge, Virginia, U.S.
- Occupations: Model, comedian, and actress
- Relatives: Cerina Fairfax (sister)

Arisce Wanzer is an American model, comedian, and actress.

== Early and personal life ==
Wanzer was born in Woodbridge, Virginia. At age 14, seeing a Victoria's Secret Fashion Show inspired her to pursue fashion and modeling. She moved to Miami, which she describes as a "trans Mecca", to attend the Art Institute of Miami at age 17 or 18. It was there, at gay clubs, that she learned what transgender people were when strangers would ask her when she planned on transitioning. She then realized she was trans. At age 19, she came out to her mother, who was very accepting and supportive. She lived in Miami for five years before moving to New York City.

In 2026, Wanzer's sister, Cerina Fairfax, was killed by her husband, former Virginia lieutenant governor Justin Fairfax.

== Career ==
Wanzer participated in a drag troupe for three to four years, also participating in numerous shows at Miami Fashion Week. Subsequently, Wanzer did catwalks at New York Fashion Week and Los Angeles Fashion Week.

Wanzer has been the covergirl for the Spiegel catalog (the first trans model to do so), and has appeared in Elle, Vogue, Vogue Italia, Forbes, and Purple, and worked with high-profile photographers such as Patrick Demarchelier. She has modeled for TopShop and Opening Ceremony. She appears in Strut on Oxygen and the trans-focused comedic webseries Fish Tank, alongside Isis King. She is also featured as part of AT&T's Live Proud campaign. In June 2019, she walked the red carpet at L.A. Pride and was interviewed by associate producer of Amazon's Pride: The Series, Braden Bradley. In 2020, she appeared in the premiere episode of Dr. 90210 that shared her rhinoplasty surgery and jaw reshaping with Dr. Michelle Lee.

== Filmography ==
Date	Series
2019	"I'm Gay" (music video)
2019	Gayish:2 (video short)
2019	Sharon Needles: Monster Mash (video short)
2019	Matt and Dan (TV series)
2019	Methadone (short)
2019	Empowered (short)
2019	"Unapolegetically"
2019	Wrap It Like That (short)
2019	Dreaming Material (music video)
2018	The Pet Peeve Police
2018	Blair St. Clair: Call My Life (short)
2018	Next of Kin
2017	"That's a Man, Maury" (music video)
2017	Enemies of Dorothy
2016-2017	Cheetah in August
2016	Interwoven
2012	What's the Function?

== Other ==
=== Podcasts ===
Date	Series	Episode
Aug. 27, 2018	LGBTQ&A	"Arisce Wanzer: Gets Candid About Sex and Dating"
Sept. 18, 2016	LGBTQ&A	"Arisce Wanzer: The Fashion Industry Needs To Embrace Diverse Women"
Sept. 2016	LGBTQ&A	"Arisce Wanzer: Why She Won't Change Herself for the Fashion Industry"
