= Drag My Dad =

Web series involving drag makeovers

- Country of origin: United States
- Original language: English

Drag My Dad is a television series streamed by MTV on Facebook Watch, starting in 2019. The show is hosted by Bob the Drag Queen, winner of season 8 of RuPaul's Drag Race. The show features eight fathers who undergo drag makeovers and bond with their children in the process.
