= Breastworld =

- RuPaul's Drag Race episode
- Episode no.: Season 10; Episode 9
- Presented by: RuPaul
- Original air date: May 17, 2018

Guest appearances
- Abbi Jacobson (guest judge); Ilana Glazer (guest judge); Stephen Colbert; Randy Rainbow

Episode chronology
← Previous "The Unauthorized Rusical"	Next → "Social Media Kings Into Queens"
- RuPaul's Drag Race season 10

"Breastworld" is the ninth episode of the tenth season of the American television series RuPaul's Drag Race. It originally aired on May 17, 2018. The episode's main challenge tasks the contestants with acting in a parody of the television series Westworld. Ilana Glazer and Abbi Jacobson are guest judges, and Stephen Colbert and Randy Rainbow also make guest appearances. Asia O'Hara wins the episode's main challenge. Eureka and Kameron Michaels place in the bottom, but neither contestant is elimination from the competition after the two face off in a lip-sync contest to "New Attitude" by Patti LaBelle.

== Episode ==
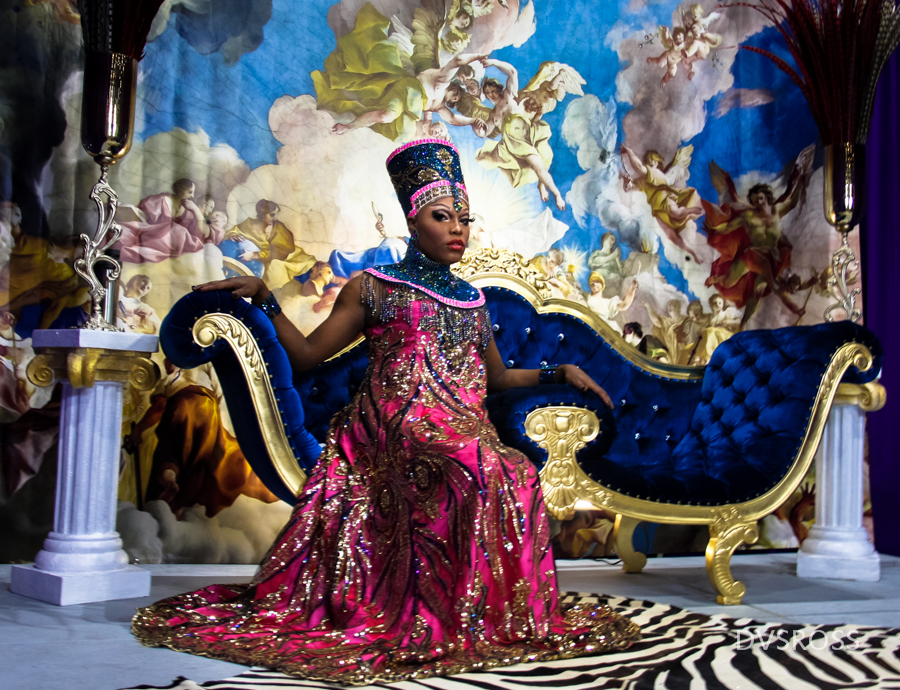
Asia O'Hara (pictured at RuPaul's DragCon LA in 2018) wins the episode's main challenge.

The contestants return to the Werk Room after The Vixen's elimination on the previous episode. On a new day, a video message featuring Stephen Colbert is played, then RuPaul greets the group and brings in members of the Pit Crew. RuPaul reveals the mini-challenge ("Pants Down, Bottoms Up"), which tasks the contestants with finding matching pairs of underwear worn by Pit Crew members. Aquaria wins the mini-challenge.

RuPaul reveals the main challenge, which tasks the contestants with acting in a parody of the HBO series Westworld, called Breastworld. As the winner of the mini-challenge, Aquaria is tasked with assigning the roles. The contestants review the script and characters, then share their preferred roles. Aquaria assigns the following cast:

- Aquaria plays Dyslexa
- Asia O'Hara plays Para Salin
- Eureka plays Rosi
- Kameron Michaels plays Muffy
- Miz Cracker plays Julie
- Monét X Change plays Viv

RuPaul returns to the Werk Room to meet with contestants individually, asking questions and offering advice. The contestants film Breastworld with Michelle Visage and Ross Mathews as directors. On elimination day, the contestants make final preparations in the Werk Room for the fashion show. The group discuss aging. Aquaria discusses her friendship with Amanda Lepore. Miz Cracker and Monét X Change talk about drag performer Darcelle XV. The group also discuss dating as drag queens.

On the main stage, RuPaul welcomes fellow judges Visage and Mathews, as well as guest judges Ilana Glazer and Abbi Jacobson. RuPaul shares the main challenge and runway assignments, then the fashion show commences. After the contestants present their looks, the group watch Breastworld. The judges deliver their critiques, deliberate, then share the results with the group. Asia O'Hara wins the main challenge. Eureka and Kameron Michaels place in the bottom and face off in a lip-sync contest to "New Attitude" (1984) by Patti LaBelle. Both are declared winners and no contestants are eliminated from the competition.

== Production and broadcast ==
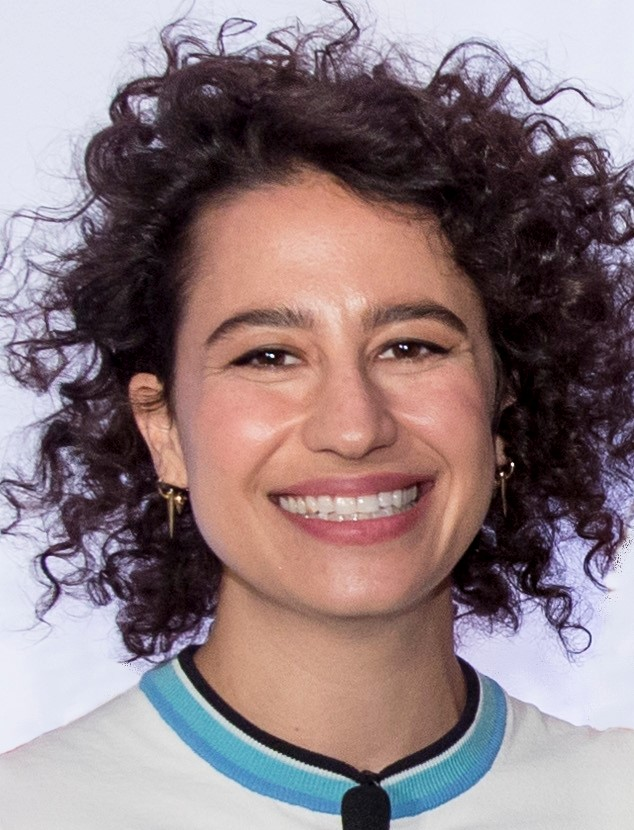
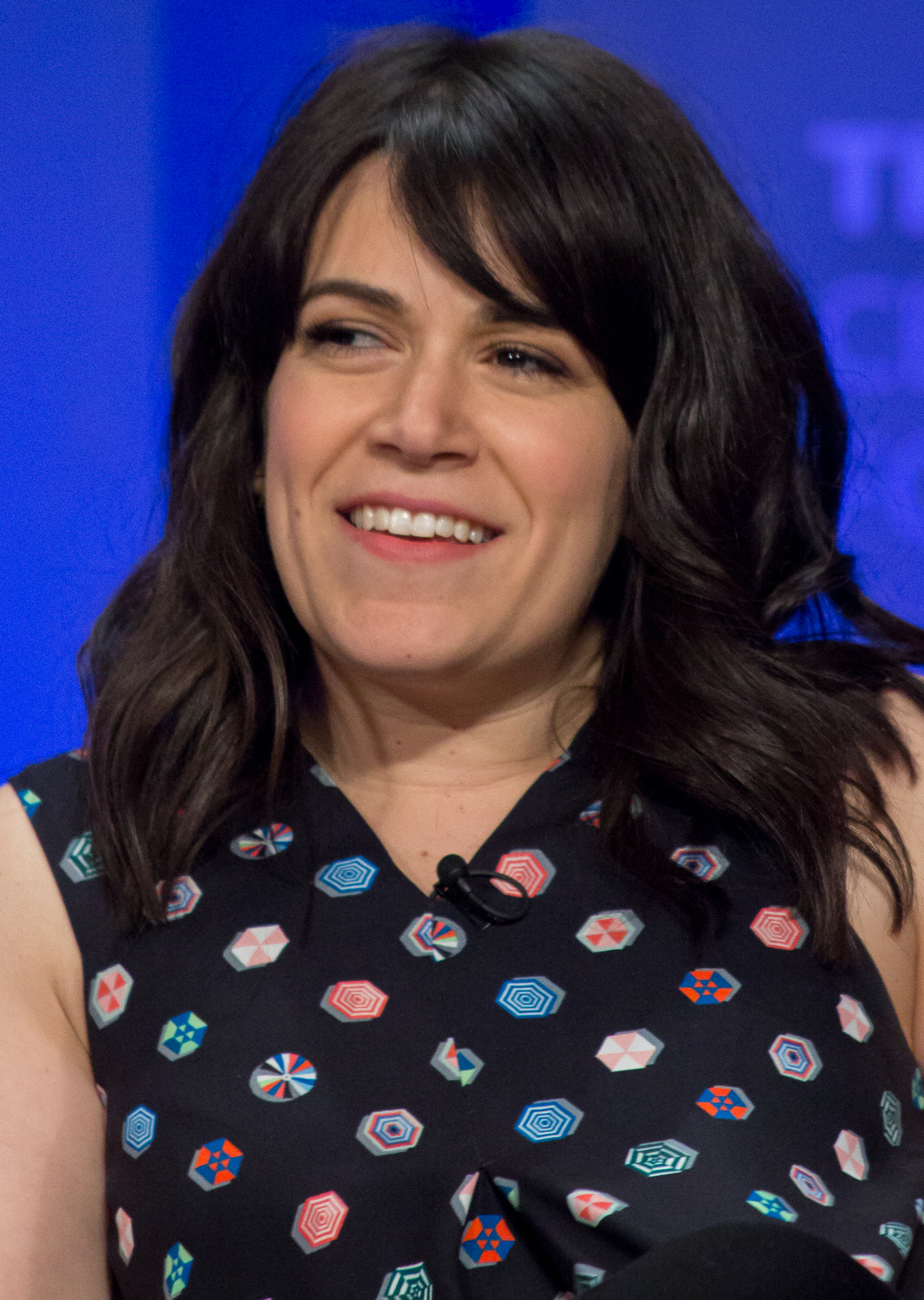
Ilana Glazer (left) and Abbi Jacobson (right) are guest judges.
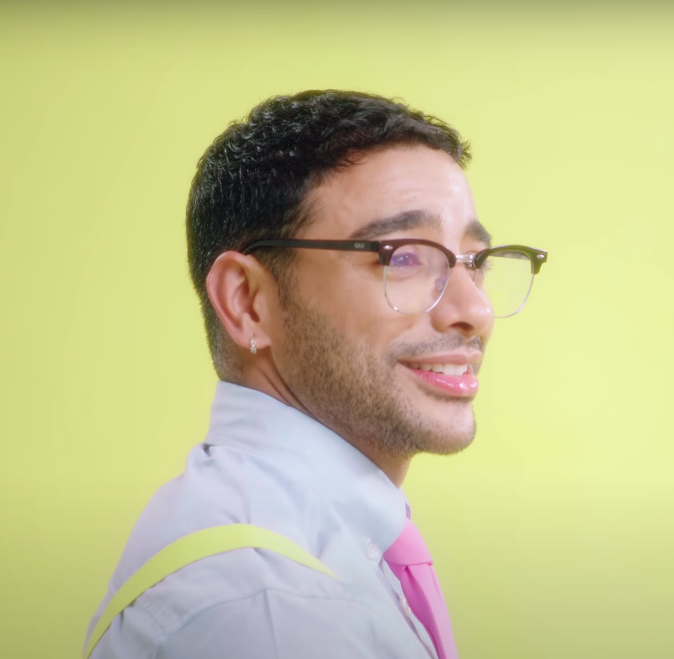
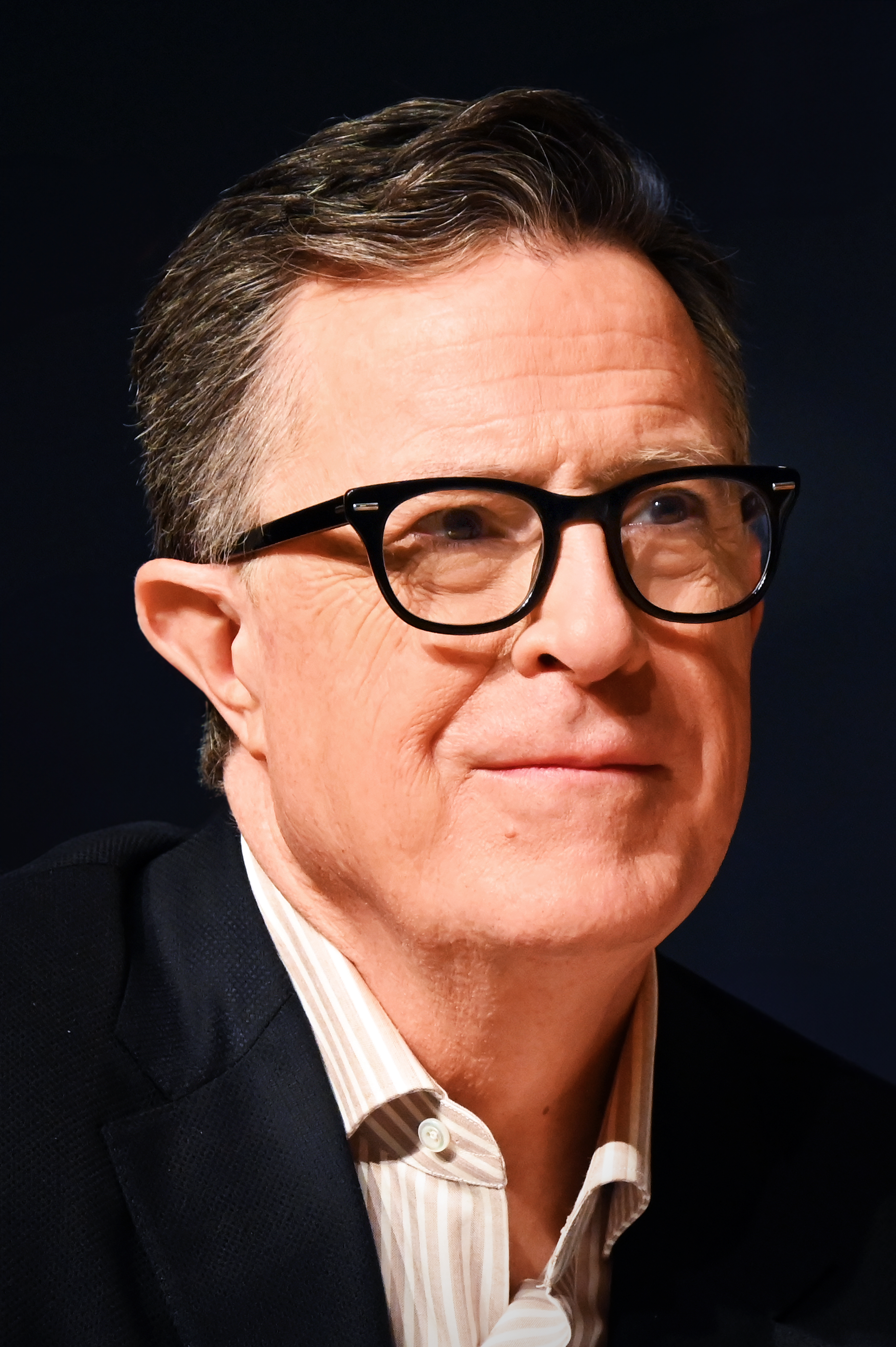
Laith Ashley (left) is among Pit Crew members in the episode and Stephen Colbert (right, pictured in 2024) narrates Breastworld.

Breastworld is narrated by Colbert. Asia O'Hara's character Para Salin is inspired by American politician Sarah Palin. Randy Rainbow makes a guest appearance at the end of Breastworld.

Laith Ashley is among members of the Pit Crew in the episode.

During the lip-sync contest, the performers do splits simultaneously.

=== Fashion ===
The fashion show's runway category ("Silver Foxy") tasks the contestants with presenting how they will look in 50 years. Miz Cracker has a knee-length dress with thick black glasses and a blonde wig. Asia O'Hara's outfit is green, red, and yellow. She has blonde braids and she eats potato chips from a bowl. Monét X Change has a gold outfit with a patient gown. She has sagging breasts and a short wig. Aquaria has a tan outfit, a long blonde wig, tattoos, and extended earlobes. Eureka has a purple outfit with a coat, as well as glasses and a blonde wig. Kameron Michaels has a black-and-gold outfit, glasses, and a blonde wig. She takes medicine from a pill organizer to become energized.

== Reception ==
Oliver Sava of The A.V. Club gave the episode a rating of 'B-'. John Paul Brammer of the magazine Them called the lip-sync contest "electric" and "stunning". Brian Moylan of Vice News said both contestants "did a great job". Sam Brooks ranked the "New Atitude" performance number 74 in The Spinoff's 2019 "definitive ranking" of the show's 162 lip-sync contests to date, writing: "Sometimes all you need is two drag queens in old-age makeup dancing around. There's a pure, innocent joy in that." Stephen Daw selected the performance for the tenth season in Billboard's 2024 list of the best lip-syncs from each of the show's main seasons.
