= Gay Barz =

2023 EP by Bob the Drag Queen

EP by Bob the Drag Queen
- Released: February 10, 2023
- Length: 13:58
- Label: Self-released
- Producer: Ocean Kelly; Sam Garfield; Mitch Ferrino

Singles from Gay Barz
- 1. "Bitch Like Me" Released: September 16, 2022; 2. "Black" Released: November 4, 2022

Gay Barz is the debut extended play by American drag queen, Bob the Drag Queen, released on February 10, 2023.

== Composition ==
Kamera Tyme, Alix Milr, Mikey Angelo and Ocean Kelly are featured on the opening title track. Billboard has described "Take My Picture" as a "throbbing electro hip-hop banger". "Monét's Interlude" features drag performer Monét X Change.

== Promotion ==
The title track received a music video.

== Track listing ==
Gay Barz track listing
No.	Title	Writer(s)	Producer(s)	Length
1.	"Gay Barz (Cypher)" (featuring Kamera Tyme, Mikey Angelo, and Ocean Kelly)	Camille Copeland; Christopher Caldwell; Michael Junchaya; Ocean Kelly	Ocean Kelly	3:31
2.	"Take My Picture"	Caldwell; Kelly	Kelly	2:16
3.	"Bitch Like Me"	Caldwell; Kelly	Kelly	2:36
4.	"Booty"	Caldwell; Sam Garfield	Sam Garfield	2:07
5.	"Black" (featuring Basit and Ocean Kelly)	Basit; Caldwell; Mitch Ferrino; Kelly	Mitch Ferrino; Kelly	3:06
6.	"Monét's Interlude" (featuring Monét X Change)	Caldwell; Kevin Bertin		0:19
Total length:				13:58
