= Lavender Haze =

2022 single by Taylor Swift

Single by Taylor Swift

from the album Midnights
- Released: November 29, 2022
- Studio: Rough Customer (New York); Electric Lady (New York); Henson Recording (Los Angeles)
- Genre: Synth-pop; ambient house; disco-pop; dream pop; electropop
- Length: 3:22
- Label: Republic
- Songwriters: Taylor Swift; Jack Antonoff; Zoë Kravitz; Sounwave; Jahaan Sweet; Sam Dew
- Producers: Taylor Swift; Jack Antonoff; Sounwave; Jahaan Sweet

Taylor Swift singles chronology
"Snow on the Beach" (2022)	"Lavender Haze" (2022)	"The Alcott" (2023)

Music video
- "Lavender Haze" on YouTube

"Lavender Haze" is a song by the American singer-songwriter Taylor Swift from her tenth studio album, Midnights (2022). Swift wrote and produced the song with Jack Antonoff, Jahaan Sweet, and Sounwave. Zoë Kravitz and Sam Dew were co-writers, and Braxton Cook was an additional producer. The title was inspired by a phrase used in the series Mad Men that refers to the state of being in love. Republic Records released "Lavender Haze" to US pop radio as the album's third single on November 29, 2022.

"Lavender Haze" incorporates pop fusion genres, ambient house, and disco, with elements of hip-hop and R&B. Its production is characterized by a thumping bassline, pulsing modular synthesizers, and layered falsetto vocals in the refrain. The lyrics were inspired by the media scrutiny surrounding Swift's relationship with the English actor Joe Alwyn: the narrator disregards others' opinions on her relationship and unwed status, and she affirms her desire to stay in love with her partner. Music critics interpreted the lyrics from a feminist perspective, and they generally praised the track's production as restrained, sophisticated, and catchy.

The single peaked at number two on the Billboard Global 200 chart and on the singles charts of Australia, Canada, Ireland, New Zealand, and the United States. It has been certified platinum in Australia, Brazil, Canada, Mexico, New Zealand, and the United Kingdom. Swift wrote and directed the music video for "Lavender Haze", which was released on January 27, 2023. It incorporates psychedelic and surrealist visual elements and features the Dominican-American model and transgender activist Laith Ashley as Swift's love interest. She included "Lavender Haze" in the set list of her sixth concert tour, the Eras Tour (2023–2024).

== Background and writing ==
The American singer-songwriter Taylor Swift conceived her tenth original studio album, Midnights, as a collection of songs about her nocturnal ruminations, detailing a wide range of emotions such as regret, lust, nostalgia, contentment, and self-loathing. She produced the standard edition of Midnights with Jack Antonoff. Swift announced the track listing via a thirteen-episode short video series on the platform TikTok; the title of "Lavender Haze" was revealed in the episode posted on October 7, 2022.

"Lavender Haze" was written by Swift, Antonoff, Sounwave, Jahaan Sweet, Sam Dew, and Zoë Kravitz. Sounwave wrote the initial track within 15 minutes. After experimenting with different sounds, he "[hit] one button by accident", which played a voice memo that Sweet had sent to him: it was a recording of his roommate Braxton Cook singing wordless melodies over some chords. Antonoff, who was in the same room with Sounwave, was fascinated by the sound. They teamed up with Dew and Kravitz to write an R&B groove using keyboards, built on Cook's vocal coos; according to Sounwave, Dew came up with the melodies and Kravitz added some sonic embellishments.

Antonoff shared the track to Swift, who wrote the lyrics based on her personal life, recorded her vocals, and sent the finished output to the other writers. Sounwave recalled their reactions when Antonoff played the finished track: "[...] all our mouths dropped. [Swift] took it to a whole new world and made it her own [by creating] different pockets we did not hear." In the credits of Midnights, Swift, Antonoff, Sounwave, and Sweet are credited as the producers of "Lavender Haze", and Cook as an additional producer.

== Music ==
"Lavender Haze"
"Lavender Haze" incorporates pop, ambient house, and R&B. It is driven by a deep Reese bass, modular synthesizers, and falsetto vocals.

"Lavender Haze" incorporates four on the floor beats, a thumping bassline generated with a synth bass, and downtempo rhythms. Swift's vocals are layered and sung in her breathy upper vocal register against swirling modular synthesizers, with background vocals from Kravitz, Dew, and Antonoff. In the refrain, she sings in her falsetto range.

Critics categorized "Lavender Haze" into pop fusion genres such as synth-pop, electropop, dream pop, and disco-pop. Some reviews described it as ambient house and "slow disco". The track displays influences of rhythmic styles, like R&B and hip-hop. (Note: R&B is cited by Variety and Rolling Stone, while hip-hop is cited by Vanity Fair and Entertainment Weekly) The bassline is the Reese bass, characterized by a very low bass patch, that evokes dance and club styles such as techno, UK garage, and jungle.

The production elements led to critics deeming the sound dark, "subterranean", dreamy, sultry, and sensual. Some reviewers likened the production styles to those on Swift's 2017 album Reputation. There were comparisons to the music by other artists: Grace Bryon from Paste thought its "bubbling electropop" production is reminiscent of the works by Lorde and Lana Del Rey, Ann Powers of NPR compared the layered vocals and synth drums to the music of Whitney Houston, and Neil McCormick of The Daily Telegraph said the falsetto "funkiness" evokes Prince.

== Lyrics and interpretations ==
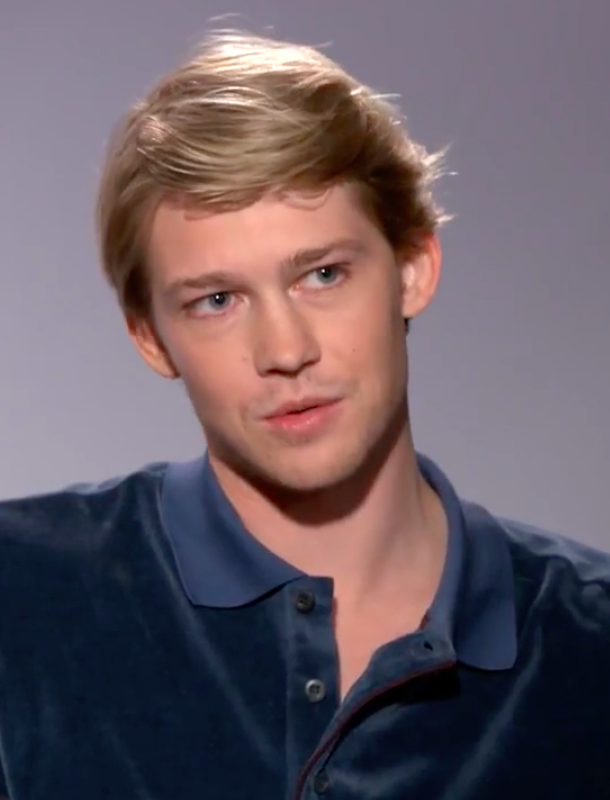
"Lavender Haze" was inspired by the scrutiny on Swift's relationship with Joe Alwyn.

In an Instagram post, Swift shared that she discovered the expression "lavender haze", which describes the state of being in love, when watching the period drama series Mad Men. Intrigued by its meaning and supposed 1950s origin, Swift saw parallels between the expression and her relationship with the English actor Joe Alwyn; she interpreted it as an "all-encompassing love glow".

The lyrics of "Lavender Haze" were inspired by the media scrutiny that Swift and Alwyn had faced. The overall message is that she wants to stay in love with him despite others' opinions. She appreciates his unwavering support for her and disregard of the gossip surrounding her past relationships in the lines: "I've been under scrutiny/ You handle it beautifully/ All this shit is new to me"; "I find it dizzying/ They're bringing up my history/ But you weren't even listening." The song also explores the pressures that come with protecting this love, such as fighting back gender stereotypes ("the 1950s shit they want from me") that demand women to become either a wife or a one-night fling. Swift ignores all of the inquiries into her unwed status: "I'm damned if I do give a damn what people say"; "Talk your talk and go viral/ I just need this love spiral."

According to several media publications, "Lavender Haze" has a feminist viewpoint and calls out the misogynistic conceptions about gender roles. In the view of Slate's Carl Wilson, the song sees Swift asserting authority and rejecting others' perception of her as a Madonna–whore complex. The New York Times's Lindsay Zoladz contended that the track represented Swift's shifted attitude towards romance: whereas her 2008 single "Love Story" depicted marriage as the ideal romantic ending with starry-eyed fairy tale imagery, "Lavender Haze" expresses ambivalence towards not only marriage but also the societal expectations and "traditional timelines of adulthood". Writing for the Alternative Press, Ilana Kaplan considered "Lavender Haze" one of the album tracks where Swift grappled with the "good-girl" image that she had constrained herself to, a notion that she had explained in the 2019 documentary Miss Americana.

There were interpretations of "Lavender Haze" from a queer perspective. According to Shaun Cullen, a professor in the humanities, this is due to the lyrics mentioning the color lavender, which is associated with gay pride; and the protest against the "1950s shit", which suggests not only defiance against gender discrimination but also sexuality-based discrimination. Cullen argued that this showcased Swift's increasing awareness of her status as "a white celebrity, artist, and citizen struggling to communicate [...] across the color line", which parallels her departure from "the trappings of Jim Crow-era country and planation nostalgia" suggested by her early country songs.

== Release and commercial performance ==
Republic Records released Midnights on October 21, 2022, with "Lavender Haze" being the opening track. "Lavender Haze" was later released as the album's third single to pop radio. In the United States, Republic released the song to contemporary hit radio on November 29, 2022. The track was supported by several remixes released in February–March 2023: a tropical house remix by Felix Jaehn, and three more by Tensnake, Snakehips, and Jungle. An acoustic version was released on March 31, 2023.

"Lavender Haze" debuted and peaked at number two on the Billboard Global 200. It made Swift the first artist to occupy the top five of the chart the same week, alongside other Midnights tracks. In the United States, the single debuted and peaked at number two on the Billboard Hot 100. It helped Swift become the first artist to monopolize the top 10 of the Hot 100 the same week, together with other Midnights tracks. It spent two consecutive weeks in the top 10, charted at number five on the Pop Airplay chart and number four on the Adult Pop Airplay chart. As Swift's 27th song to enter the top 10 of the Adult Pop Airplay, it made Swift the solo artist with the most top-10 entries.

The single peaked at number two on the charts in Australia, Canada, Ireland, and New Zealand; number three in the Philippines and the United Kingdom; and number four in Singapore. It reached the top 10 in Portugal, Vietnam, Iceland, and South Africa. "Lavender Haze" has been certified four-times platinum in Australia; double platinum in New Zealand; platinum in Brazil, Canada, Mexico, and the United Kingdom; and gold in Poland, France, Portugal, and Spain.

== Live performances ==
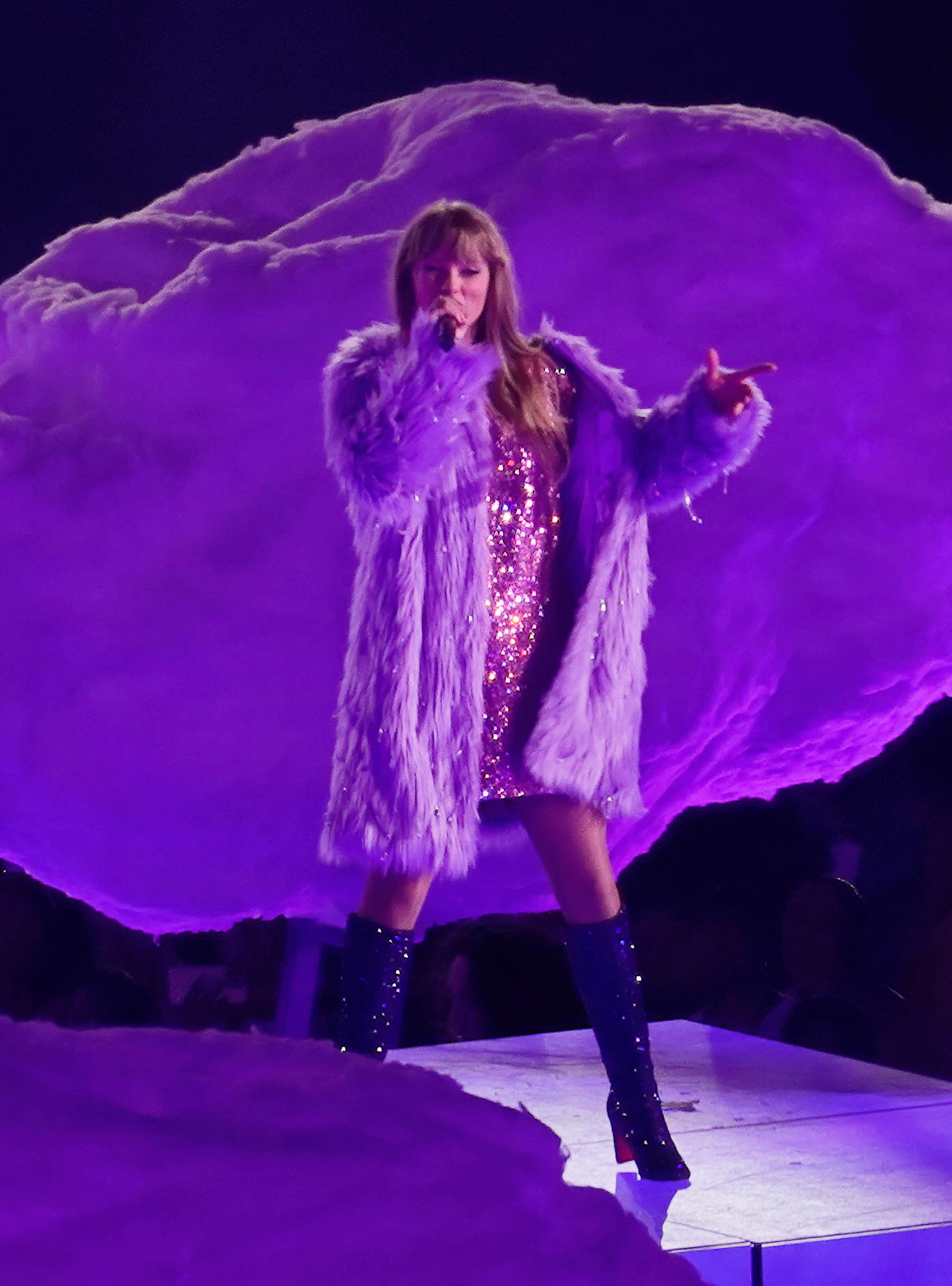
Swift performing "Lavender Haze" on the Eras Tour in 2023

Swift performed "Lavender Haze" as the opening number of the Midnights act on the Eras Tour (2023–2024). Before the performance, the stage floor displayed a video of Swift swimming and visuals onstage showed ocean waves. She then appeared onstage in a purple fur coat, climbing up a ladder leading to an elevated platform, as dancers wheeled around with lavender artificial clouds as props. Visuals onstage showed Swift lying in a lavender field, dancing in lavender clouds, and sitting and posing as abstract lavender lines cascaded around her. Variety's Chris Willman thought that the performance set the sensual tone for Midnights, the final act of the concert, as "the best after-hours club in the world".

== Critical reception ==
"Lavender Haze" received positive reviews from music critics; many deemed it a strong opening track that sets the tone for Midnights. (Note: As discussed in reviews by Variety, The Times, Vanity Fair, Slate, and Rolling Stone) The production was a common point of praise: PopMatters's Rick Quinn and The A.V. Club's Saloni Gajjar complimented the sound as catchy and danceable, while Rolling Stone's Brittany Spanos and Our Culture Mag's Konstantinos Pappis deemed it restrained and muted, with the former adding that it has a playfulness to it. In Vulture, Craig Jenkins deemed it one of the R&B-tinged tracks of Midnights that showcased Swift's abilities to create "a mannered genre reset constantly threatening to cut in an alluring new direction". Elise Ryan of the Associated Press considered it one of the album's more experimental cuts and deemed Swift's delivery "beckoning". Annie Zaleski similarly lauded her vocals as "sophisticated and alluring", and The New York Times's Jon Caramanica picked the track as one of the album's better moments with Swift's great singing. A lukewarm review came from Slant Magazine's Paul Attard, who felt that the opening seconds were burdened by excessive reverb and turned out overwhelming.

Other reviews focused on the lyrics. Billboard's Jason Lipshutz placed the track fourth on his ranking of all 13 Midnights tracks; he contended that the lyrics were direct and barbed, and were elevated by the sophisticated production elements. Willman thought that the feminist message was provocative, interesting for the audience, and self-revelatory for Swift. In a similar vein, Quinn was impressed by Swift's rejection of societal norms and embrace of her own emotional journey. Paul Bridgewater from The Line of Best Fit contended that the song was convincing because it showcased Swift's reflective side, "holding a mirror to herself and past behaviours". Mary Siroky from Consequence selected "Lavender Haze" as one of the album's essential tracks, praising how it functions as a "self-contained world". Jenkins wrote that although the song was inspired by Swift's fame and celebrity, its depiction of a desire for uncomplicated love was resonant and relatable to any listener.

"Lavender Haze" has appeared on some rankings of Swift's songs. In his list of the select 75 tracks by Swift, Willman highlighted her defiance against the "1950s shit" stereotype and described its production as "a good groove in every possible regard". The song appeared in the upper-tier of rankings by Rolling Stone's Rob Sheffield (88 out of 286) and Vulture's Nate Jones (71 out of 245). Slant Magazine's editorial staff picked "Lavender Haze" as one of the 20 best collaborations by Swift and Antonoff, and Billboard placed it at number 69 on their list of the best songs of 2022.

== Music video ==
The video for "Lavender Haze" incorporates psychedelic and surrealist visuals. This screenshot depicts Swift's house as a celestial body, afloat amidst large koi fish and lavender-hued fog.

The music video for "Lavender Haze" premiered on Swift's Vevo channel on YouTube, on January 27, 2023. Its behind-the-scenes video was released on March 3, 2023. She wrote and directed the video herself. It incorporates psychedelic and surrealist visual elements. (Note: Psychedelic visual elements are cited by Pitchfork and Paper, while surrealist elements are cited by Billboard and Rolling Stone) According to Swift, "Lavender Haze" was the first Midnights music video for which she wrote the treatment; she described the concept as "a sultry sleepless 70's fever dream" that encapsulated the "world and mood" of the album.

The video has a dominant purple color scheme and 1970s fashion and interior design. It starts with Swift waking up at midnight, listening to vinyl records, burning incense, and tracing the outline of the universe on the back of her lover (portrayed by the Dominican-American transgender activist and model Laith Ashley). Her bedroom is then engulfed in a lavender-hued fog, in which Swift dances. She then crawls across a 1970s living room whose carpets are blooming with lavender flowers and tears the television apart to reveal a cosmic aquarium with giant koi fish floating.

Swift is then seen swimming in a purple-hued pool and having a house party with her friends while cuddling with her lover, engulfed in the lavender mist. The video ends with Swift floating in outer space with a lavender fog and fish swimming around her. According to publications, the "Lavender Haze" video contains numerous Easter eggs that link to Swift's re-recorded album Speak Now (Taylor's Version) and other Midnights tracks.

== Accolades ==
Awards and nominations
Organization	Year	Category	Result	Ref.
Nickelodeon Mexico Kids' Choice Awards	2023	Global Hit of the Year	Nominated	
BMI Pop Awards	2024	Most Performed Songs of the Year	Won	

== Credits and personnel ==
Credits are adapted from the liner notes of Midnights.

Studios

- Recorded at Electric Lady Studios, New York City; Rough Customer Studio, Brooklyn; and Henson Recording Studio, Los Angeles
- Mixed at MixStar Studios, Virginia Beach, Virginia
- Mastered at Sterling Sound, Edgewater, New Jersey
- Jahaan Sweet's performance recorded by himself at The Sweet Spot, Los Angeles
- Dominik Rivinius's performance recorded by Ken Lewis at Neon Wave Studio, Pirmasens, Germany

Personnel

- Taylor Swift – vocals, songwriter, producer
- Jack Antonoff – songwriter, producer, engineer, drums, programming, percussion, synths, Juno 6, Mellotron, Wurlitzer, background vocals, recording
- Zoë Kravitz – songwriter, background vocals
- Sounwave – songwriter, producer, programming
- Jahaan Sweet – songwriter, producer, engineer, bass, bass pad, flute, Juno, recording
- Sam Dew – songwriter, background vocals, recording
- Braxton Cook – additional producer
- Dominik Rivinius – snare
- Laura Sisk – engineer, recording
- Ken Lewis – engineer, recording
- Megan Searl – assistant engineer
- Jon Sher – assistant engineer
- John Rooney – assistant engineer
- Mark Aguilar – assistant engineer
- Jonathan Garcia – assistant engineer
- Serban Ghenea – mixing
- Bryce Bordone – assistant mix engineer
- Randy Merrill – mastering
- Ryan Smith – mastering for vinyl

== Charts ==
=== Weekly charts ===
Weekly chart performance for "Lavender Haze"
Chart (2022–2023)	Peak position
Argentina Hot 100 (Billboard)	70
Australia (ARIA)	2
Austria (Ö3 Austria Top 40)	15
Belgium (Ultratop 50 Flanders)	49
Canada Hot 100 (Billboard)	2
Canada AC (Billboard)	16
Canada CHR/Top 40 (Billboard)	6
Canada Hot AC (Billboard)	5
Croatia (Billboard)	17
Czech Republic Airplay (ČNS IFPI)	57
Czech Republic Singles Digital (ČNS IFPI)	18
Denmark (Tracklisten)	27
Denmark Airplay (Tracklisten)	20
France (SNEP)	78
Germany (GfK)	71
Global 200 (Billboard)	2
Greece International (IFPI)	6
Hong Kong (Billboard)	17
Hungary (Stream Top 40)	26
Iceland (Tónlistinn)	9
India International Singles (IMI)	6
Indonesia (Billboard)	25
Ireland (IRMA)	2
Italy (FIMI)	63
Lithuania (AGATA)	14
Luxembourg (Billboard)	12
Malaysia (Billboard)	5
Malaysia International (RIM)	4
Netherlands (Single Top 100)	22
New Zealand (Recorded Music NZ)	2
Norway (VG-lista)	13
Philippines (Billboard)	3
Portugal (AFP)	7
Singapore (RIAS)	4
Slovakia (Singles Digitál Top 100)	22
South Africa (RISA)	10
South Korea Download (Circle)	181
Spain (Promusicae)	36
Sweden (Sverigetopplistan)	18
Switzerland (Schweizer Hitparade)	18
UK Singles (Official Charts)	3
US Billboard Hot 100	2
US Adult Contemporary (Billboard)	18
US Adult Pop Airplay (Billboard)	4
US Dance Airplay (Billboard)	6
US Pop Airplay (Billboard)	5
Vietnam Hot 100 (Billboard)	8

=== Year-end charts ===
Year-end chart performance for "Lavender Haze"
Chart (2023)	Position
Australia (ARIA)	88
Canada (Canadian Hot 100)	28
Global 200 (Billboard)	72
US Billboard Hot 100	32
US Adult Contemporary (Billboard)	49
US Adult Pop Airplay (Billboard)	16
US Dance/Mix Show Airplay (Billboard)	30
US Pop Airplay (Billboard)	15

== Certifications ==
Certifications for "Lavender Haze"
Region	Certification	Certified units/sales
Australia (ARIA)	4× Platinum	280,000^{‡}
Brazil (Pro-Música Brasil)	Platinum	40,000^{‡}
Canada (Music Canada)	Platinum	80,000^{‡}
Denmark (IFPI Danmark)	Gold	45,000^{‡}
France (SNEP)	Gold	100,000^{‡}
Mexico (AMPROFON)	Platinum	140,000^{‡}
New Zealand (RMNZ)	2× Platinum	60,000^{‡}
Poland (ZPAV)	Gold	25,000^{‡}
Portugal (AFP)	Gold	5,000^{‡}
Spain (Promusicae)	Gold	30,000^{‡}
United Kingdom (BPI)	Platinum	600,000^{‡}
^{‡} Sales+streaming figures based on certification alone.

== Release history ==
Release dates and formats for "Lavender Haze"
Region	Date	Format	Version	Label(s)	Ref.
United States	November 29, 2022	Contemporary hit radio	Original	Republic	
United States	January 10, 2023	Hot adult contemporary radio	Original	Republic	
United States	January 27, 2023	Digital download	Original	Republic	
Various	February 10, 2023	Digital download; streaming	Felix Jaehn remix	Republic	
United States	March 3, 2023	Digital download	Tensnake remix	Republic	
United States	March 3, 2023	Digital download	Snakehips remix	Republic	
United States	March 3, 2023	Digital download	Jungle remix	Republic	
Various	March 3, 2023	Digital download; streaming	Remixes	Republic	
Italy	March 17, 2023	Radio airplay	Original	Universal	
Various	March 31, 2023	Digital download; streaming	Acoustic	Republic	
