= Strut (TV series) =

- Genre: Reality television
- Starring: Cecilio Asuncion; Arisce Wanzer; Dominique Jackson; Isis King; Laith Ashley; Ren Spriggs
- Country of origin: United States
- Original language: English
- No. of seasons: 1
- No. of episodes: 6

Production
- Executive producers: Whoopi Goldberg; Tom Leonardis; Stephanie Noonan Drachkovitch; Bobby Sizemore
- Running time: 42 minutes
- Production companies: One Hoe Productions; 44 Blue Productions; Thigh High Productions

Original release
- Network: Oxygen
- Release: September 20 – October 25, 2016

Strut is an American reality television series that premiered on September 20, 2016, on the Oxygen cable network. Announced in May 2016, the reality series follows the professional lives of a group of transgender models. The show is executive produced by Whoopi Goldberg. The show features models Laith Ashley, Dominique Jackson, Isis King, Ren Spriggs, and Arisce Wanzer.

"[The models] are struggling with things we can all relate to — trying to make ends meet, fighting to make a name for themselves and navigating the minefields of personal relationships. All of these struggles are amplified by the fact that they are also fighting to break down barriers and taking on the responsibility of representing the transgender community in today's society. It's time to separate caricature from real people, and that’s what we are doing with Strut," said Goldberg. During the season finale Richard H. Lowe, III the International Creative Director for Spiegel (catalog) selects Arisce Wanzer to be featured as the first trans covergirl for an American catalog company.

== Episodes ==
No.	Title	Original release date	U.S. viewers (millions)
1	"A Model Life"	September 20, 2016 (Note: The first episode, "A Model Life", was released online on September 13, 2016.)	0.22
The series begins focusing on Slay, a modeling agency dedicated to focusing on transgender individuals. Depicted are models who struggle to balance the pressures of work, sacrifices in their life and personal lives as they deal with the ups and downs of transitioning.
2	"The Time is Now"	September 27, 2016	0.19
Pressure spikes when the ladies are pushed outside their comfort zones. Also, Dominique makes difficult choices following a disastrous Slay Mixer, and Laith experiences a first date since transitioning.
3	"LA LA Land"	October 4, 2016	0.18
Laith arrives in Los Angeles for work and the Slay ladies are drawn to him, with Arisce beating Isis to the punch by asking him for a date. Meanwhile, Ren sees her father for the first time since she transitioned when she invites him to a shoot.
4	"The Big Apple"	October 11, 2016	N/A
The models strut their stuff for industry insiders as Cece tries to make a name for Slay in New York City. Meanwhile, tragedy strikes, Laith and Arisce inch closer together, and old memories haunt newbie Ren.
5	"Cover Girl"	October 18, 2016	N/A
At a go-see in New York, the models meet with Richard H. Lowe, III the International Creative Director for Spiegel Catalog all want to make history as the first transgender cover girl, but there's only room for one; Arisce and Laith begin a long-distance relationship; Isis goes on a blind date.
6	"The Next Chapter"	October 25, 2016	0.23
Ren gets a big break as a groundbreaking trans cover girl, yet her inexperience jeopardizes the shoot. Meanwhile, Laith hopes to introduce Arisce to his mother, and everyone tries to help Al pull off a big surprise for Dominique.

== See also ==
- The Prancing Elites Project (2015)
- Transparent (2014)
- Media portrayals of transgender people
