= Randy Rainbow =

American comedian, singer, and YouTuber

- Rainbow in 2026
- Born: July 6, 1981 (age 45); Huntington, New York, U.S.
- Occupations: Comedian; singer; actor
- Years active: 2010–present
- Known for: Political satire; parody music
- Political party: Democratic

YouTube information
- Channel: Randy Rainbow
- Genre: Commentary
- Subscribers: 902 thousand
- Views: 197 million
- Last updated: 3 Dec 2025
- Website: randyrainbow.com

Randy Stewart Rainbow (born July 6, 1981) is an American comedian, singer and actor. He is best known for spoof interviews that he uploads to YouTube that blend political satire and musical parodies from a left-leaning perspective. He has been Emmy-nominated six times, five as Executive Producer of The Randy Rainbow Show and one as performer. He has also been Grammy-nominated once.

== Early life ==
Randy Rainbow was born to a Jewish family in Huntington, New York. Rainbow is his real last name. He grew up in Commack, New York. When he was 10 years old, his father, Gerry Rainbow (né Ribner), a musician and talent booker, moved the family to Plantation, Florida. Rainbow credits his grandmother as his greatest comedic influence. In a 2017 interview with The New York Times, he recalled, "It was really my grandmother who was the biggest influence because she'd talk back to the celebrities and politicians on TV. She was a combination of Joan Rivers, Elaine Stritch, Betty White, and Bea Arthur rolled into one." After dropping out of community college in his early 20s, Rainbow moved back to New York to pursue a theatrical career. It was then he began blogging and making comedic videos.

== Career ==
=== Blog ===
Rainbow created his blog, The Randy Rainbow Bloggity BLAHg-BLAHg, to document his theatrical experiences and "kvetch about my day-to-day as a single homo in the city."

=== Celebrity videos ===
In his early work, Rainbow stages fake phone conversations with famous people by editing real audio clips of those celebrities. He posted his breakout video, "Randy Rainbow is Dating Mel Gibson" in 2010. It received more than 60,000 views in one week and has since surpassed 910,000 views. Subsequent videos include "Randy Rainbow Calls Lindsay Lohan", "Randy Rainbow Calls Dr. Laura", "The Morning After Chelsea's Wedding", "Randy Rainbow Gets a Job (from Rachel Zoe?)", "Randy Rainbow Kicks It with Kanye West", and "Randy Rainbow Spends Christmas with Mel Gibson". Michael Urie appeared as himself in "Randy Rainbow Getting Married?" Tituss Burgess appeared as himself in "Randy Rainbow Stars in a Show!" Brent Corrigan appeared as himself in "Randy Rainbow Makes a Sex Tape (w/Mel Gibson)". Rainbow's cat Mushi has also appeared in some of his videos.

Rainbow's videos have been featured on a number of blogs. Popular LGBT blogs Towleroad and Queerty have reposted many of his videos since "Randy Rainbow is Dating Mel Gibson". His Lohan clip was featured by Perez Hilton. Rainbow made a guest appearance in Tituss and the Tightass Band, a 2010 benefit concert for The Trevor Project at New World Stages. He also made a guest appearance in the third annual Living for Today benefit concert at the Laurie Beechman Theatre. Rainbow appeared on the cover of Out Front Colorado.

=== Political videos ===
Rainbow gained a larger audience and shifted focus during the 2016 American presidential campaign, with a series of spoof interviews and musical parodies skewering the election process and the candidates, especially Donald Trump, who became Rainbow's primary subject following his nomination by the Republican Party and subsequent election. Among the musical parodies he has done about politics are:

Title of parody	Release date	Original song	Original production or performer
"Carly Fiorina: GOP Dropout"	February 13, 2016	"Beauty School Dropout"	Grease
"Jeb Bush: GOP Dropout"	February 22, 2016	"Beauty School Dropout"	Grease
"Ben Carson: GOP Dropout"	March 5, 2016	"Beauty School Dropout"	Grease
"Marco Rubio: GOP Dropout"	March 17, 2016	"Beauty School Dropout"	Grease
"Just In Love (with Ted Cruz)"	April 30, 2016	"You're Just in Love"	Call Me Madam
"John Kasich: GOP Dropout"	May 5, 2016	"Beauty School Dropout"	Grease
"Ted Cruz: GOP Dropout"	May 5, 2016	"Beauty School Dropout"	Grease
"Ya Got Trump Trouble!"	July 26, 2016	"(Ya Got) Trouble"	The Music Man
"Extra Braggadocious"	September 26, 2016	"Supercalifragilisticexpialidocious"	Mary Poppins
"Grab ‘Em By The P***y"	October 10, 2016	"Give a Little Whistle"	Pinocchio
"The Nasty Woman"	October 24, 2016	"The Lonely Goatherd"	The Sound of Music
"Trump-Pence, Trump-Pence"	November 7, 2016	"Feed the Birds"	Mary Poppins
"Hillary Wins!?!? - Randy Rainbow's American Dream"	November 11, 2016	"Thoroughly Modern Millie"	Thoroughly Modern Millie
"Donald Trump, Grow Up!"	November 23, 2016	"You'll Be Back"	Hamilton
"Tweets, Tweets, And Nothing But Tweets"	January 12, 2017	"Prologue: Into the Woods" (Witch's rap: Greens, Greens)	Into the Woods
"Alternative facts"	January 24, 2017	"Prologue: Jellicle Songs for Jellicle Cats"	Cats
"Fact Checker, Fact Checker"	February 6, 2017	"Matchmaker, Matchmaker"	Fiddler on the Roof
"You're Making Things Up Again, Donald"	February 22, 2017	"Making Things Up Again"	The Book of Mormon
"Putin and the Ritz"	March 7, 2017	"Puttin' On the Ritz"	Puttin' On the Ritz
"Microwaves (Are Watching You!)"	March 16, 2017	"Private Eyes"	Hall & Oates
"Kill The Release"	March 19, 2017	"The Mob Song"	Beauty and the Beast
"Just My Bill (O'Reilly)"	April 22, 2017	"Bill"	Show Boat
"Unpopular"	April 29, 2017	"Popular"	Wicked
"The Russian Connection"	May 15, 2017	"Rainbow Connection"	The Muppet Movie
"Donald Trump's Mango Tour!"	May 31, 2017	"Rainbow Tour"	Evita
"The Covfefe Broadway Medley"	June 2, 2017	Various: "Chim Chim Cher-ee"; "Let's Call the Whole Thing Off"; "Shipoopi"; "Memory"; "Consider Yourself"; "Maria"; "Oklahoma"	Various: Mary Poppins; Shall We Dance; The Music Man; Cats; Oliver!; West Side Story; Oklahoma!
"Russia Ties"	June 17, 2017	"Summer Nights"	Grease
"Before He Tweets"	July 5, 2017	Before He Cheats	Carrie Underwood
"The Room Where It Happened"	July 21, 2017	"The Room Where It Happens"	Hamilton
"The Sycophant Italiano"	August 1, 2017	"Cinema Italiano"	Nine
"Yes! We Have No Steve Bannon"	August 22, 2017	"Yes! We Have No Bananas"	Billy Jones
"DACA Shame"	September 7, 2017	"Danke Schoen"	Wayne Newton
"How Do You Solve a Problem Like Korea?"	September 25, 2017	"Maria" / "Rocket Man"	The Sound of Music / Elton John
"Desperate Cheeto"	October 11, 2017	"Despacito"	Luis Fonsi featuring Daddy Yankee
"Sweet Indictment"	November 1, 2017	"Sweet Transvestite"	The Rocky Horror Show
"Those Were the Good Old Days"	November 14, 2017	"Those Were the Good Old Days"	Damn Yankees
"She Was 16 Going on 17 (Roy Moore Was 32)"	December 11, 2017	"Sixteen Going on Seventeen"	The Sound of Music
"Buttons!"	January 9, 2018	"The Patty Duke Show Theme Song"	The Patty Duke Show
"All About His Base"	January 29, 2018	"All About That Bass" / "Lips Are Movin"	Meghan Trainor
"Stand By Your Man (Donald Trump)"	February 14, 2018	"Stand by Your Man"	Tammy Wynette
"KIDS!"	March 5, 2018	"Kids"	Bye Bye Birdie
"You Can't Stop His Tweets"	April 9, 2018	"You Can't Stop the Beat"	Hairspray
"Rudy and The Beast"	May 7, 2018	"Beauty and the Beast"	Beauty and the Beast
"Commander of Cheese!"	June 9, 2018	"It Sucks to Be Me"	Avenue Q
"WTF, You Guys!?"	June 22, 2018	"Omigod You Guys"	Legally Blonde
"A Very Stable Genius"	July 16, 2018	"Major-General's Song"	The Pirates of Penzance
"Omarosa"	August 21, 2018	"Oklahoma!"	Oklahoma!
"If You Ever Got Impeached"	August 27, 2018	"If I Only Had a Brain"	The Wizard of Oz
"Kavanaugh"	September 24, 2018	"Camelot"	Camelot
"Just Be Best"	October 15, 2018	"Be Our Guest"	Beauty and the Beast
"Voting!"	November 6, 2018	"What Is This Feeling?"	Wicked
"Trump's Favorite Things"	December 5, 2018	"My Favorite Things"	The Sound of Music
"There Is Nothin' Like a Wall"	January 14, 2019	"There Is Nothing Like a Dame"	South Pacific
"The Donald Trump Cell Block Tango (Part 1)"	January 28, 2019	"Cell Block Tango"	Chicago
"Border Lies"	February 20, 2019	"Borderline"	Madonna
"He's in Love (And We're all Gonna Die)"	March 7, 2019	"A Wonderful Guy"	South Pacific
"The Mueller Blues"	March 29, 2019	"The God-Why-Don't-You-Love-Me Blues"	Follies
"Cruella DeVos"	April 5, 2019	"Cruella de vil"	101 Dalmatians
"Barr!"	April 29, 2019	"Belle"	Beauty and the Beast
"Just Impeach Him"	May 28, 2019	"Breathin"	Ariana Grande
"Suckers"	July 22, 2019	"Sucker"	The Jonas Brothers
"Cheeto Christ Stupid-Czar"	August 29, 2019	"Superstar"	Jesus Christ Superstar
"GIULIANI! (Here He Goes Again)"	October 17, 2019	"Mamma Mia"	ABBA
"He's Just a GURL Who'll QUID PRO QUO!"	November 22, 2019	"I Cain't Say No"	Oklahoma!
"That Don!"	January 20, 2020	"Gaston"	Beauty and the Beast
"No Rules For Donald"	February 18, 2020	"New Rules"	Dua Lipa
"Any Dem Will Do"	March 3, 2020	"Any Dream Will Do"	Joseph and the Amazing Technicolor Dreamcoat
"The Coronavirus Lament"	March 14, 2020	"Adelaide's Lament"	Guys and Dolls
"Social Distance"	March 22, 2020	"Go the Distance"	Hercules
"Andy"	April 6, 2020	"Sandy"	Grease
"A Spoonful of Clorox"	April 25, 2020	"A Spoonful of Sugar"	Mary Poppins
"Distraction"	May 19, 2020	"Tradition"	Fiddler on the Roof
"The Bunker Boy"	June 7, 2020	"The Jitterbug"	The Wizard of Oz
"Cover Your Freakin' Face"	June 9, 2020	"Put On a Happy Face"	Bye Bye Birdie
"Poor Deplorable Troll"	July 6, 2020	"Poor Unfortunate Souls"	The Little Mermaid
"Gee, Anthony Fauci"	July 22, 2020	"Gee, Officer Krupke"	West Side Story
"Kamala!"	August 17, 2020	"Camelot" (reprised)	Camelot
"I Won't Vote Trump"	September 13, 2020	"I Won't Grow Up"	Peter Pan
"If Donald Got Fired" (featuring Patti LuPone)	October 7, 2020	"If Momma Was Married"	Gypsy
"How Will You Vote?"	October 30, 2020	"That's How You Know"	Enchanted
"Don't Tell Donald He's NOT RE-ELECTED TODAY!"	November 17, 2020	"Getting Married Today"	Company
"Rudolph the Leaky Lawyer"	December 15, 2020	"Rudolph the Red-Nosed Reindeer"	Gene Autry
"Sedition!"	January 8, 2021	"Tradition" (repeated by popular request)	Fiddler on the Roof
"Seasons of Trump"	January 19, 2021	"Seasons of Love"	Rent
"Marjorie Taylor Greene"	February 3, 2021	"Evergreen"	A Star Is Born
"Mr. Biden, Bring My Vaccine"	March 9, 2021	"Mr. Sandman"	The Chordettes
"Ted and Lindsey"	April 5, 2021	"Kansas City"	Oklahoma!
"Clang, Clang, Clang Went Josh Hawley"	May 10, 2021	"The Trolley Song"	Meet Me in St. Louis
"The Tango: Vaccine"	February 7, 2022	"The Tango Maureen"	Rent
"Gurl, You're a Karen"	March 14, 2022	"Dentist!"	Little Shop of Horrors
"Gay!"	April 4, 2022	"Shy"	Once Upon a Mattress
"Thoughts and Prayers"	August 4, 2022	"Dance: Ten; Looks: Three"	A Chorus Line
"Lock Him Up Yesterday"	August 18, 2022	"Yesterday"	The Beatles
"Speaker of the House"	January 23, 2023	"Master of the House"	Les Misérables
"Life's a F***ing Fantasy for Santos"	March 15, 2023	"Jolly Holiday" / "Georgy Girl"	Mary Poppins / The Seekers
"Grumpy Trumpy Felon from Jamaica in Queens"	April 3, 2023	"Boogie Woogie Bugle Boy"	The Andrews Sisters
"Welcome to DeSantis"	May 15, 2023	"Welcome to the 60's"	Hairspray
"Donald in the John with Boxes"	June 23, 2023	"Lucy in the Sky with Diamonds"	The Beatles
"Don't Arraign on His Parade"	August 22, 2023	"Don't Rain on My Parade" / "I'm So Excited"	Funny Girl / The Pointer Sisters
"Forty-Five"	May 20, 2024	"9 to 5"	Dolly Parton
"Look At Me, I'm MTG"	May 30, 2024	"Look at Me, I'm Sandra Dee"	Grease
"The Lawyer or the Conman"	August 12, 2024	"The Farmer and the Cowman"	Oklahoma!
"JD, JD... (Married Lady)"	August 26, 2024	"Sadie, Sadie"	Funny Girl
"Blank Space (Donald's Version)"	September 30, 2024	"Blank Space"	Taylor Swift
"MAGADU"	October 29, 2024	"Xanadu"	Xanadu
"I Think I'm Gonna HATE It Here"	December 16, 2024	"I Think I'm Gonna Like It Here"	Annie
"Defy Democracy"	March 5, 2025	"Defying Gravity"	Wicked
"Fees, Fees, Fees"	April 14, 2025	"Please Please Please"	Sabrina Carpenter
"Incompetent!"	May 6, 2025	"Impossible"	Cinderella
"That's Trump Derangement"	May 20, 2025	"That's Entertainment!"	The Band Wagon
"He Just Can't Wait to Be King"	August 25, 2025	"I Just Can't Wait to Be King"	The Lion King
"Big Phony Schmuck"	November 10, 2025	"Pink Pony Club"	Chappell Roan
"RFK"	December 2, 2025	"Cabaret"	Cabaret
"It's Beginning to Look a Lot Like F*** This"	December 9, 2025	"It's Beginning to Look a Lot Like Christmas"	Perry Como
"Lyin' and Spinnin' (and Cheatin' and Hidin')"	February 10, 2026	"Wishin' and Hopin'"	Dionne Warwick
"The Fate of Melania (Randy's Version)"	February 26, 2026	"The Fate of Ophelia"	Taylor Swift
"Not What They're Paid For"	April 6, 2026	"What Was I Made For?"	Billie Eilish
"Where the Hell Is Our Congress?"	May 18, 2026	"Where Is My Husband!"	Raye
"A Very Stable Genius: Part Two"	June 9, 2026	"Major-General's Song"	The Pirates of Penzance
"He's De-Mented!"	June 30, 2026	"It's De-Lovely"	Cole Porter
"Dummy with the Wig on Top"	September 24, 2026	"The Surrey with the Fringe on Top"	Oklahoma!
"The RFK Jr. Lament"	October 13, 2026	"Adelaide's Lament"	Guys and Dolls
"Mitchcraft"	October 23, 2026	"Witchcraft"	Frank Sinatra

=== Filmography ===
Year	Title	Role	Notes
2018	RuPaul's Drag Race	Special Guest	Episode: "Breastworld"
2020	Better Things	Andrew	Episode: "New Orleans"
2020	Take Me to the World: A Sondheim 90th Birthday Celebration	Performer (song: "By the Sea")	Streaming television special

=== Musical career ===
Rainbow has released several recordings on Broadway Records. He released three singles in August 2012: an original jingle for Chick-fil-A written while he was employed there, a cover of "An Old-Fashioned Wedding," and a parody of "Born This Way" called "Born This Gay."

He released the holiday EP Hey Gurl, It's Christmas! on November 8, 2019, featuring a studio version of "Trump's Favorite Things"; the title track is an original song.

Following the launch of his Pink Glasses Tour, Rainbow released his debut studio album A Little Brains, A Little Talent on October 29, 2021. The album includes several studio versions of his YouTube parodies, plus the two original songs "Pink Glasses," and "Randy Rainbow For President!" both co-written by Rainbow. The album also features a studio version of "The Jitterbug," a scrapped song from The Wizard of Oz, and two bonus tracks: "If Donald Got Fired" (featuring Patti LuPone) and "Mr. Biden (Bring My Vaccine)."

=== Bibliography ===
In 2022, Rainbow's debut book, Playing With Myself, earned a spot as a New York Times best-seller. In 2025, Rainbow's children's book, Randy Rainbow and the Marvelously Magical Pink Glasses, placed at number 95 on USA Today's best-seller list.

Year	Work
2022	Playing With Myself
2024	Low-Hanging Fruit: Sparkling Whines, Champagne Problems, and Pressing Issues from My Gay Agenda
2025	Randy Rainbow and the Marvelously Magical Pink Glasses

== Awards and nominations ==
Rainbow was nominated for a Primetime Emmy Award for Outstanding Short Form Variety Series in 2019 and 2020.

After Primetime Emmy Award categories were combined starting in 2021 to form the Outstanding Short Form Comedy, Drama or Variety Series, The Randy Rainbow Show was nominated in 2021 and again in 2022.

The album A Little Brains, A Little Talent was nominated for the Grammy Award for Best Comedy Album at the 65th Annual Grammy Awards.

He received two Emmy Award nominations in 2026, for Outstanding Performer in a Short-Form Comedy or Drama Series and Outstanding Short-Form Comedy, Drama, or Variety series.

== Personal life ==
Rainbow is Jewish and openly gay. He was born on Long Island, lived in Queens for 17 years, attended community college in Plantation, Florida, and since July 2019 has resided in Manhattan.

On April 19, 2022, Rainbow published a memoir, Playing With Myself, which tells the story of his personal life and rise to internet fame.

=== Controversy ===
In mid-August 2020, critics of Randy Rainbow circulated several dozen of his tweets, all but a few published between 2010 and 2012, featuring jokes widely described as racist and transphobic. Rainbow apologized on August 20, 2020, in an interview with The Advocate.
