= Straight Talk with Ross Mathews =

- Genre: Comedy, Entertainment, Advice, Talk
- Language: English

Cast and voices
- Hosted by: Ross Mathews, CJay (Chris Jordan), Mr. Malone (TAFKAF) & Nikki B. (Nikki Boyer) & The Loons

Music
- Opening theme: "Straight Talk" by Dolly Parton

Production
- Production: Ross Mathews Previously: Joshua Rodriguez, Will Sterling, Rich Boerner

Publication
- Original release: November 06, 2014 – February 03, 2023
- Provider: Westwood One

Straight Talk with Ross Mathews (STWR) is a weekly podcast described as "Advice & LOLs from the Gay Best Friend You Wish You Had and Know You Need," hosted by Ross Mathews. The audio podcast episodes are typically between forty-five minutes to one and one-half hours in length. The show features celebrity interviews, personalized segments, and group discussion on pop culture & current events. The show was first released on November 11, 2014. The show's theme song is "Straight Talk" by Dolly Parton.

The program features segments including Press-Conference, Snack Attack!, Nikki B. Trending, Balls Deep with Mr.Malone, Senior Citizens Gay Movie Critic Bill's Movie Reviews, The Blackness, Gettin’ Saucy with JRod, and more! The show also features specialized segments such as The Straight Talkie Awards, Rapid Fire Kisses, What's under the blanket, Balls Deep With Mr.Malone, Freaky Fagsy, Num That Tune, When did that did it happen, Mrs Straight talk with Ross, and Kiss Kiss & Tell. The show features regulars such as Jillian Barberie, co-hosts such as Malone and Nikki Boyer, and celebrity guests such as Rosie O’Donnell.
