= Leland Bobbé =

American photographer

- Born: December 25, 1948 (age 77); Manhattan, New York
- Education: State University of New York at Binghamton

Leland Bobbé is an American photographer known for commercial portraiture and for personal work capturing fringe elements of society. He has made portraits of burlesque performers and drag queens; and street photography in New York City’s Times Square and the Bowery in the mid-1970s, eighteen of which are in the collection of the Museum of the City of New York.

== Career ==
After two years at the New Division at Nasson College (an experimental college in Springvale, Maine), Bobbé graduated from the State University of New York at Binghamton with a major in sociology in 1970. He then moved into New York City to pursue a career as a musician. He immediately bought his first 35 mm camera, and became obsessed with photography. His band City Lights was part of the CBGB scene in the mid-1970s and was the first such band to sign a recording contract. After signing to Sire Records, the band put out an album and toured. Bobbé photographed the Ramones, Patti Smith, Blondie, and Television among others. During this time he lived downtown below Chinatown in what was then the Fulton Fish Market, and supported himself by driving a taxi. He started to make photographs on the streets of New York City, focusing on seedy Times Square and the down and out men living on the Bowery.

After deciding to concentrate upon photography, Bobbé got a full-time job assisting Robert Farber, a fashion and fine art photographer, which he did for two years. In 1980 he went freelance. While working as an assistant, he started his first themed project, "Stormy Weather," black and white photos of discarded umbrellas on the streets of Manhattan. He showed them to the photo editor at Popular Photography and this became his first published personal project. In the later half of the decade Leland picked up his drum sticks once again and was the drummer in a rock trio called Johnny Jewel with frontman John Berenzy, releasing one album on 3rd Rail Records.

During this time he was working mainly as a beauty photographer, but after about 10 years he became disillusioned by the fashion scene and began to integrate his personal work into his commercial portfolio. This involved shooting real people geared to the advertising market with color, motion and blur that was present in his color street photography. Also during this time, Bobbé sought to have more control of his income so he became involved in the then booming business of stock photography, creating images for top agencies such as Getty Images, Corbis and Photonica. He served as president of Stock Artists Alliance from 2003-2004, a large advocacy group of professional stock shooters. He also began to concentrate on shooting real people portraits to get away from the lifestyle photography that he was producing for stock.

== Influences ==
Bobbé’s inspirations for his photographs come from many places, both internal and external. As with most artists, he is influenced by other artists working both within and outside his discipline – in Bobbé’s case, photographers such as Harry Callahan, Steve Pyke, and Richard Avedon, as well as painters like Mark Rothko and Edward Hopper;

== Projects ==
=== Portrait ===
- Neo-Burlesque (2009–2011) — studio portraits of New York City neo-burlesque performers in stage costume. Exhibited over 3 months at the Museum of Sex in New York City.
- Americana Portraits (2011) — portraits of Americans found at upstate New York summer fairs.
- Half-Drag (2012–2013) — studio beauty portraits of drag queens as half male and half female, questioning traditional views on gender. The project appeared on thousands of fashion and design websites, blogs, and newspapers including Vogue Italia, MSN, and The Huffington Post.
- Unsung Heroes (2015) — studio portraits of musicians over the age of 50, including Gene Cornish, Lenny Kaye, Liberty DeVitto, and Carmine Appice.

=== Other ===
- Urbanscapes — people in New York City shown as reflections, silhouettes, and shadows.
- Women of Fifth Avenue (2007–2008) — street photos of wealthy women on the streets of Fifth Avenue between 50th and 60th street.
- NYC Wall Art (2013–2014) — layers of ripped and tattered posters on the walls of buildings that yield a pop art effect, taken with an iPhone. These were shown at POP International gallery on the Bowery in New York City.
- Underground NYC (2015–2016) — scenes from New York City subways, taken with an iPhone.

== Awards ==
- 2009: XTO Image Awards – 2nd Prize, Photography - Body Art, for Neo-Burlesque series
- 2010: Black & White Spider Awards – 3rd Place - Honor of Distinction, Abstract - Professional, for Black Swan
- 2010: XTO Image Awards – 3rd Prize, Photography - Books, for Neo-Burlesque Book Proposal
- 2010: Prix de la Photographie (Px3) – 1st Place, "Professional Book (Series Only), People" category, for Neo-Burlesque book proposal
- 2011: Graphis Photo Annual 2011 - 100 Best Photographs, for Albert Cadabra
- 2012: One Eyeland Awards – Bronze - Professional Special Cameras (iPhone), for NYC Wall Art
- 2012: One Eyeland Awards – Finalist - Professional Portrait, for Half-Drag
- 2013: One Eyeland Awards – Bronze - Professional Portrait, for Half-Drag
- 2013: Best of ASMP, American Society of Media Photographers, for Half Drag
- 2015: Mobile Photography Awards – Honorable Mention - Silhouettes, for Streetlight
- 2015: One Eyeland Awards – Finalist - Professional Portrait, for Musicians 50+
- 2016: Black & White Spider Awards – Nominee, Silhouette - Professional, for Streetlight
- 2016: Black & White Spider Awards – Nominee, People - Professional, for Man Behind Window
- 2017: International Color Awards – Honorable Mention, People - Professional, for Sleeping Family
- 2017: London International Creative Competition – Honorable Mention, Photography - Professional, for Underground NYC Series
- 2018: International Color Awards – Nominee, Portrait - Professional, for Hardhat 1
