= Cheetah in August =

2015 American TV series

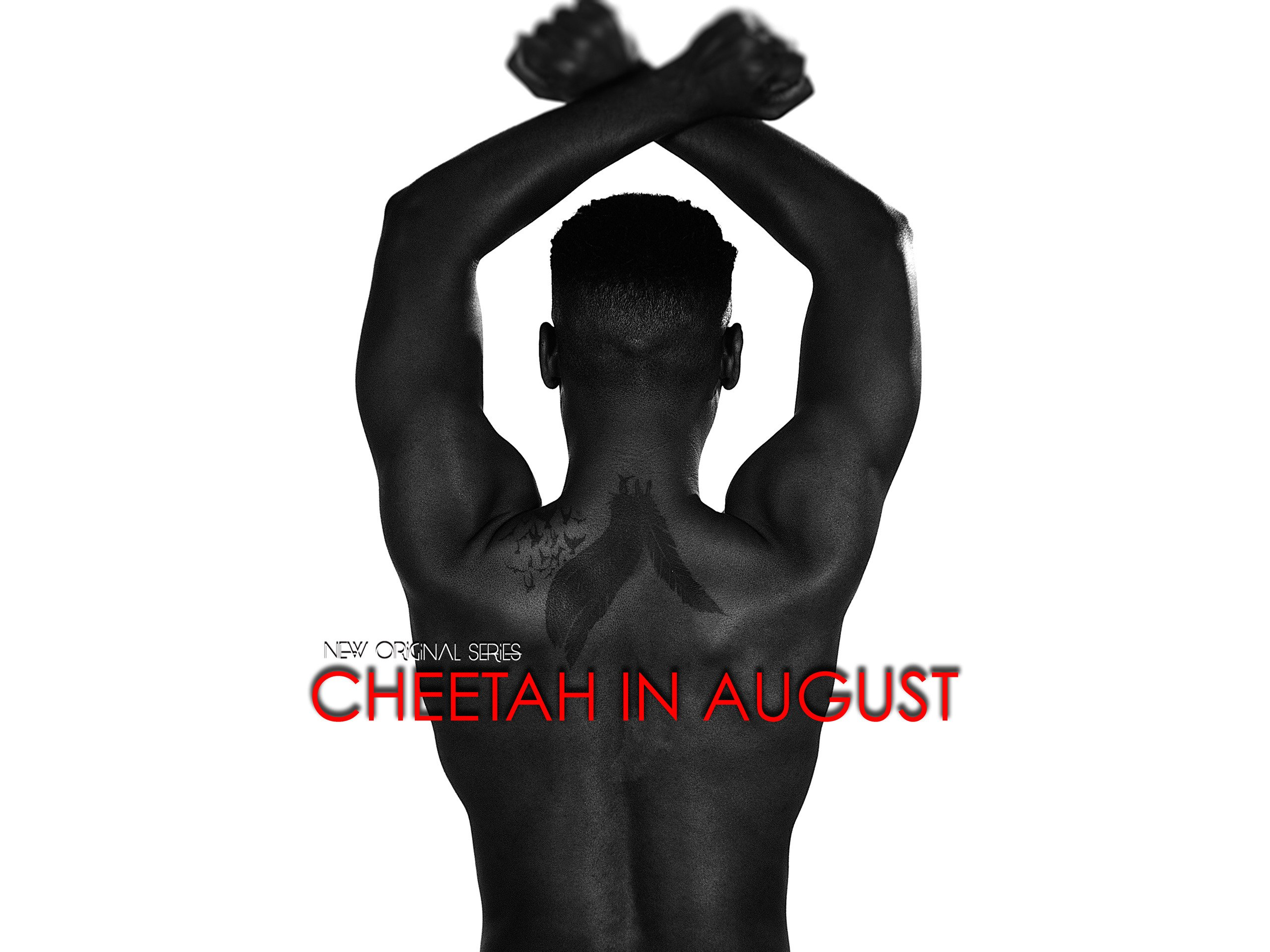
- Genre: Drama; Romance; LGBT
- Created by: Anthony Bawn; Brentley Bawn
- Starring: Andre Myers; Rashad Davis; Judeline Charles; Devion Coleman
- Country of origin: United States
- Original language: English
- No. of seasons: 2
- No. of episodes: 22

Production
- Executive producers: Anthony Bawn; Brentley Bawn
- Producer: Andrea Tyler
- Production location: Los Angeles
- Editors: Robert Adams; Anthony Bawn
- Camera setup: Robert Adams
- Running time: 17–31 minutes
- Production company: APB Productions

Original release
- Network: Watch VIM
- Release: August 25, 2015 – present

Cheetah In August is an American drama television series created by Anthony Bawn for Vimeo On Demand that debuted on August 25, 2015. The series was renewed for a second season.

== Main cast ==
- Andre Myers as August Chandler, former high school track star who has developed a condition which he believe he is able to heal through sexual connection
- Rashad Davis as Chanel Houston, successful author and news anchor
- Judeline Charles as Donna Anderson, wife of Thatcher Anderson and TV journalist
- Devion Coleman as Brennen, personal assistant to Donna and on-and-off again lover of Chanel

== Recurring cast ==
- Devion Coleman as Brennen
- Donta Morrison as Chuck
- Jennipher Lewis as Cora
- Brentley Bawn as Cory
- Dre Matthews as Donnie

== Distribution ==
The series was picked up by Amazon Video.

== Episodes ==
=== Season 1 ===
| No. overall | No. in season | Title | Directed by | Written by | Original release date |
|---|---|---|---|---|---|
| 1 | 1 | "Pilot (It's Cheetah)" | Anthony Bawn | Andrew Malone | August 25, 2015 |
| 2 | 2 | "Mahogany Sings the Blues" | Anthony Bawn | Andrew Malone | August 25, 2015 |
| 3 | 3 | "You Got the Answers" | Anthony Bawn | Andrew Malone | August 25, 2015 |
| 4 | 4 | "I Lost God" | Anthony Bawn | Andrew Malone | August 25, 2015 |
| 5 | 5 | "He's Coming" | Anthony Bawn | Andrew Malone | September 1, 2015 |
| 6 | 6 | "Doors Closing" | Anthony Bawn | Andrew Malone | September 8, 2015 |
| 7 | 7 | "Steam and Light" | Anthony Bawn | Andrew Malone | September 15, 2015 |
| 8 | 8 | "Work of Art" | Anthony Bawn | Andrew Malone | September 22, 2015 |
| 9 | 9 | "Black Arts Movement" | Anthony Bawn | Andrew Malone | September 29, 2015 |
| 10 | 10 | "Were All Tops" | Anthony Bawn | Andrew Malone & Anthony Bawn | October 13, 2015 |
| 11 | 11 | "Let's Move Around" | Anthony Bawn | Andrew Malone & Anthony Bawn | October 13, 2015 |
| 12 | 12 | "Fight or Flight" | Anthony Bawn | Anthony Bawn | October 13, 2015 |

=== Season 2 (2016) ===
| No. overall | No. in season | Title | Directed by | Written by | Original release date |
|---|---|---|---|---|---|
| 13 | 1 | "Calling All the Monsters" | Anthony Bawn | Corey Wright & Rhonda Kennedy | October 25, 2016 |
| 14 | 2 | "Reunited and It Feels So Good" | Anthony Bawn | Keanu Gallen & Corey Wright | November 1, 2016 |
| 15 | 3 | "Without Love" | Anthony Bawn | Corey Wright and Rhonda Kennedy | November 8, 2016 |
| 16 | 4 | "Here Comes the Boom" | Anthony Bawn | Corey Wright and Rhonda Kennedy | November 15, 2016 |
| 17 | 5 | "Give In" | Anthony Bawn | Corey Wright and Rhonda Kennedy | November 22, 2016 |
| 18 | 6 | "Win Some, Lose Some" | Anthony Bawn | Corey Wright and Rhonda Kennedy | February 7, 2017 |
| 19 | 7 | "Chanel from Hell" | Anthony Bawn | Corey Wright and Rhonda Kennedy | February 14, 2017 |
| 20 | 8 | "Touchstone" | Anthony Bawn | Corey Wright and Rhonda Kennedy | February 21, 2017 |
| 21 | 9 | "Spent" | Anthony Bawn | Corey Wright and Rhonda Kennedy | February 28, 2017 |
| 22 | 10 | "To a Head" | Anthony Bawn | Corey Wright and Rhonda Kennedy | March 7, 2017 |

== Plot ==
The show stars Andre Myers and Jonathan Medina, as therapist and patient who struggle to uncover the real condition of August, from his high school years into adult life

The series touches on the topics of sexuality, love, religion, psychology, and self-hate. Dr. Thatcher Anderson (Jonathan Medina) is August's therapist hired by his former lover, author, and news anchor Chanel Houston (Rashad Davis). His patient is August Chandler (Andre Myers).

At the start of the season we are introduced to August's alter ego, "Cheetah", who is the main force preventing August from enjoying a monogamous relationship with his current lover Anthony (Brandon Anthony). The tables are turned when we discover that August had escaped from an abusive relationship with Chanel, and gets a job working in a local gay bar called Lady Marmalade owned by Chuck (Donta Morrison) along with his lover Corey (Brentley Willis).

In the midst of hiding from his past, August attempts to start over with Anthony. However, Chanel finds August and proclaims his love for him while admitting he is in a new relationship with Brennen (Devion Andrez Coleman), and that he plans to go public with the launch of his new book, Doors Open. August finds himself in a corner and calls Thatcher for help. Thatcher's wife Donna (Judeline Charles) is left in the dark about the developing relationship between August and Thatcher, only to find out through Thatcher's over-observant secretary Cora (Jennipher Lewis). Everything down spirals as Anthony discovers August's past and confronts him at Thatcher's office. The connections of each character intertwine within a web of sex, lies, deception, and murder.

== Production ==
Anthony Bawn created the pilot of Cheetah In August for Vimeo.com, and it became available for free streaming and download on August 25, 2015. He was inspired by Patrik-Ian Polk's 2005 series Noah's Arc.

Bawn has said that he hopes to use the series to explore ideas of ethnic LGBT identity through a "mentally confused young adult searching for normalcy" and that he pictured how a young black male growing up in a religious family could develop social desegregation within the gay community.

Cheetah In August premiered all twelve episodes simultaneously in late October 2015.

== Production of Season 2 ==
The second season of Cheetah In August was commissioned in 2016, with Bawn Media overseeing the production. The company procured the services of screenwriter Rhonda Kennedy for the creation of the season. Kennedy was sourced through Screenwriting Staffing, a platform managed by Jacob N. Stuart, that connects production companies with writing talent.

Rhonda Kennedy was tasked with writing a season consisting of 10 episodes. The finalized episodes were released on Amazon Instant Video and Tubi, allowing viewers to access the content promptly and easily.

== Awards ==
=== Season 1 (2015) ===
| Award | Date of ceremony | Category | Recipients | Result | Ref(s) |
|---|---|---|---|---|---|
| Web Series Festival Global | August 4, 2016 | Outstanding Drama Series | Cheetah In August | Nominated | |
| The GFaB Awards | September 15, 2016 | Best LGBT TV Series Drama | Cheetah In August | Won | |

=== Season 2 (2016) ===
| Award | Date of ceremony | Category | Recipients | Result | Ref(s) |
|---|---|---|---|---|---|
| Los Angeles Film Awards | December 16, 2016 | Honorable Mention "Best Web Series" | Cheetah In August | Won | |
| Outfest | March 1, 2017 | Best LGBT TV Series Drama | Cheetah In August | Won | |
