= Ezra Michel =

American singer-songwriter

- Michel in 2024

Background information
- Born: June 2, 1995 (age 31); Culver City, California, US
- Genres: Folk, Pop, Folk-pop
- Occupations: Musician, Actor, Content Creator
- Instruments: Vocals, Guitar, Producer
- Years active: 2018--present
- Member of: The Pussyboys
- Website: ezramichelmusic.com

Ezra Michel is a transgender American musician, actor, designer, and digital creator. His work frequently explores transmasculinity through music, fashion, humor, and online media. Michel is the lead singer/songwriter of the band The Pussyboys, the founder of Pussyboy Apparel, and appeared as Andres in Telemundo's comedy-drama series 100 Dias Para Enamorarnos. He was included in the 2023 Forbes 30 Under 30 Music list.

== Career ==
Michel is a musician, actor, designer, and digital creator whose work frequently explores transmasculinity through music, fashion, humor, and personal storytelling.

In 2020, Michel gained an online following after releasing his solo single "Man of My Dreams", and becoming popular on TikTok. That year, he also appeared as Andrés in the Telemundo comedy-drama series 100 dias para enamorarnos, becoming the networks' first openly transmasculine actor featured on a series.

In 2021, Michel released the solo single "Girl Baby," written from the perspective of a parent affirming their nonbinary child. The accompanying music video was directed by Michel's then-partner, Bob the Drag Queen, and featured an all-transmasculine cast, including Gottmik and Laith Ashley. Michel described the project as an effort to create greater visibility and conversation around transmasculinity.

Michel continued building an audience through social media, where his videos combine humor, personal storytelling, and commentary on gender and sexuality. He has also worked with Trans Pride Los Angeles and NYC Pride's Youth Pride in support of transgender and queer communities.

Michel founded the clothing brand Pussyboy Apparel, which uses humor and provocative language to explore transmasculinity.

Michel was included in the 2023 Forbes 30 Under 30 Music list, which recognized his work across music, acting, digital media, and LGBTQ advocacy.

Michel later founded the transmasculine indie pop/rock band The Pussyboys, for which he serves as the lead singer, songwriter, and guitarist. In June 2024, the band released their debut single "Dumb Boy Energy," followed by a music video directed by Siobhan McCarthy.

Michel's digital work has also received academic attention. A 2024 article published in the University of California Press journal Feminist Media Histories examined his social-media work as a form of trans Latinx media activism.

== Personal life ==
Michel attended Mills College before leaving without graduating. He is a transgender man and uses he/him pronouns. Michel has also publicly described himself as nonbinary.

Michel is of Mexican descent; his father was born in Mexico. He is married to actress and digital creator Elle Deran. In 2025, the couple moved from Los Angeles, California, initially settling in Jalisco, Mexico.

Michel has also spoken publicly about his sobriety.
