= Spoopy =

2019 EP by Sharon Needles

EP by Sharon Needles
- Released: October 11, 2019
- Length: 15:43
- Label: Producer Entertainment Group

Sharon Needles chronology
Battle Axe (2017)	Spoopy (2019)

Spoopy is the debut extended play (EP) by American drag performer Sharon Needles, released through Producer Entertainment Group on October 11, 2019. It includes six covers of songs with a Halloween theme. The music video for "Monster Mash", released on the same day, features an appearance by drag performer Alaska Thunderfuck, Sharon Needles' ex-partner. The EP received generally positive reviews from music critics, who appreciated the collection's theme and reinterpretations.

== Background and composition ==
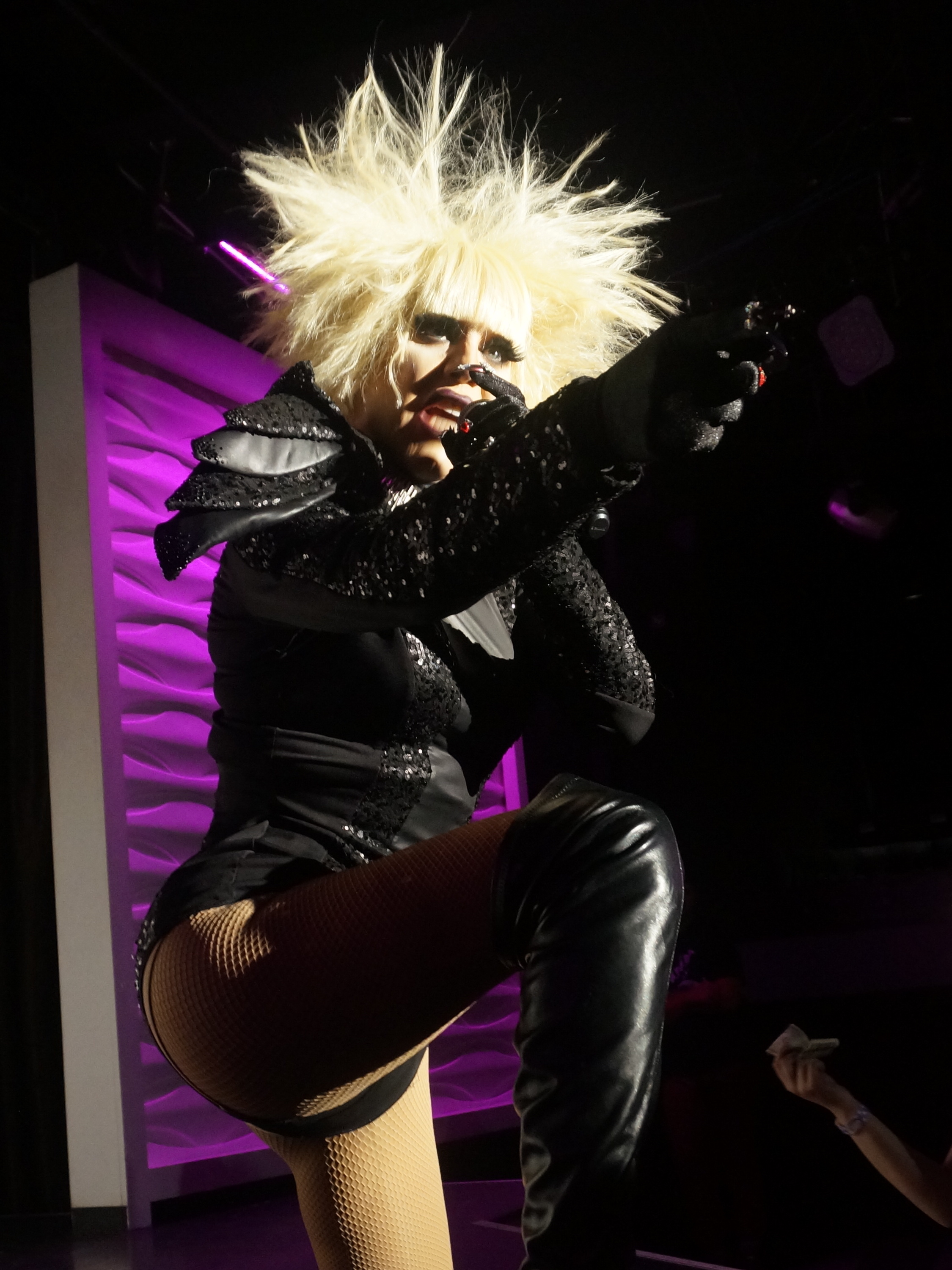
Sharon Needles (pictured in 2017) described the EP as "a Halloween gift" to her fans.

Spoopy is Sharon Needles' first EP, and follows the release of her three studio albums PG-13 (2013), Taxidermy (2015), and Battle Axe (2017). The EP features six cover versions of songs with a Halloween theme. She has described it as "a Halloween gift" to her fans, and said, "As a writer, one truly never trusts their own truth. But in covers one can find themself lost in the words of others." Urban Dictionary defines the slang term "spoopy" as "something that is funny and spooky at the same time".

Sharon Needles said of the title:

If you've never heard the word 'spoopy,' you must be living under a rock, or you're over the age of 40. The kids rely on misspellings of words. I think [this one] comes from a misspelling of a Halloween decoration that was at Target, where instead of a K, they put a P, and it became 'spoopy,' like 'creppy.' There are these buzzwords in pop culture, and I think they're completely stupid... Spoopy makes me laugh so much. It's a word that connects me with this newfangled thing called social media. The new medium of celebrity and exposure is in these kids' cell phones, so I thought, why not meet them halfway?

She has also said, "if [Urban Dictionary's definition of 'spoopy'] doesn't sum up someone like me, I don't know what does".

A cover of Bobby Pickett's novelty song "Monster Mash" (1962) serves as the opening track. Sharon Needles has said, "'The 'Monster Mash' is not only an iconic, nostalgic, and classic halloween rock n' roll jam, but it speaks to the child in everyone that loved knocking on a door or hitting a doorbell and saying the sweet words of 'trick or treat." Following "Monster Mash" are covers of AC/DC's "Highway to Hell" (1979), the Classics IV song "Spooky" (1967), Sheb Wooley's novelty song "Purple People Eater" (1958), "Devil with the Blue Dress On" (1964), and Rockwell's "Somebody's Watching Me" (1984). Spoopy is approximately 15 minutes, 43 seconds in length.

== Release and promotion ==
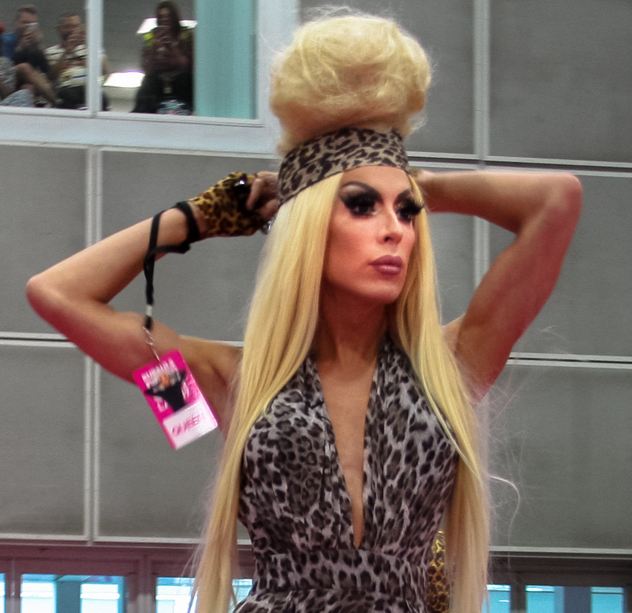
The "Monster Mash" music video features Sharon Needles' ex-partner and drag performer Alaska Thunderfuck.

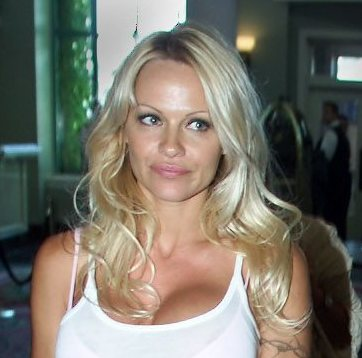
In the video, Sharon Needles recreates the slow motion running made famous by Pamela Anderson (pictured in 2003) as C. J. Parker on Baywatch.

Spoopy was released for digital download by the record label Producer Entertainment Group on October 11, 2019.

=== Music video ===
The music video for "Monster Mash", also released on October 11, was directed by Brad Hammer, with Aurora Sexton serving as art director. It features Sharon Needles' ex-partner and fellow RuPaul's Drag Race contestant, Alaska Thunderfuck. The video was filmed "in a retro and classic pinup style", according to Instinct's Michael Cook, and sees Sharon Needles host "her own psycho beach party complete with goth partygoers [and] classic monster masks". She said of the video, "In the '50s and '60s, even Hollywood revived the 1930s Universal monsters ... so I wanted to merge that resurgence and nostalgic feeling of Universal monsters with a juxtaposition of an Annette Funicello/Rock Hudson, G-rated, feel-good beach movie. Those concepts melded together ... But, it's all about three things: rock & roll, nostalgia, and Halloween."

Alaska Thunderfuck's appearance in the video was inspired by her portrayal of Bette Davis in a spoof of the 1962 film What Ever Happened to Baby Jane? during an episode of All-Stars 2. Sharon Needles considers Alaska's involvement an Easter egg, explaining, "If you remember, at the end of Baby Jane, Bette Davis drags Joan Crawford to the beach and orders two strawberry ice creams. So, I have the scene of me walking over Alaska with the two strawberry ice cream cones. To make it hammy, we stepped away from the visuals of What Ever Happened to Baby Jane? [a]nd went full-on Mommie Dearest."

Entertainment Weekly's Joey Nolfi said the video has an "odd (yet satisfying) mix of old Hollywood aesthetics (from crafting an Annette Funicello-themed beach fantasy to dressing hunky bodies with classic Universal monster masks)". He called Alaska's appearance "hilarious". Mike Wass of Idolator said the video sees Sharon Needles "doing her ghoulish thing at the beach", flirting with "ripped, speedo-wearing monsters" and impersonating Pamela Anderson's "iconic ... slow motion, boob-heaving run" as the fictional character C. J. Parker on the television series Baywatch. Wass opined, "In other words, it's an absolute must-see." NewNowNext's Christopher Rudolph called the video "down right 'SPOOPY!'"

== Critical reception ==
Spoopy was met with generally positive reviews from music critics. Cook wrote, "On her latest album ... Needles has taken some of our favorite classic Halloween tracks and redone them in her own unique style, putting an even spookier take on tracks that are patented Sharon Needles, along with some that are completely unexpected gems." He said that she "slinks into [the opening track] seamlessly" and called the rest of the EP a "perfect melding of our favorite Queen of all things spooky along with Halloween classics", including "some interesting and definitely on brand tracks". Cook continued, stating that Sharon Needles "completely shreds" "Highway to Hell", calling her performance "a strong and welcome departure for this always daring artist". He said "Devil with the Blue Dress On" "would make original artist Mitch Ryder proud". Of "Somebody's Watching Me", Cook opined that Sharon Needles "[turned] the pop anthem into a Halloween anthem for the next generation".

Pride.com's Taylor Henderson described Spoopy as "eerie" and "spooky", and included "Monster Mash" on the "Bops 4 Gays" playlist of new music by LGBTQ+ artists. Lyndsey Parker of Yahoo! Entertainment said the EP sees Sharon Needles "putting her black-fingernailed touch on creepy-crawly classics" and called the collection "the perfect campy soundtrack for any Halloween lip-sync contest".

== Track listing ==
Track listing adapted from AllMusic and Apple Music

No.	Title	Length
1.	"Monster Mash"	2:51
2.	"Highway to Hell"	3:06
3.	"Spooky"	2:35
4.	"Purple People Eater"	2:23
5.	"Devil with the Blue Dress On"	1:58
6.	"Somebody's Watching Me"	2:50
Total length:		15:43
