= Val Haller =

English musician (1952–2012)

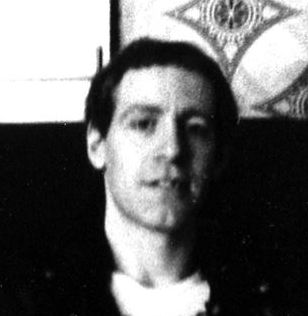
- Haller in 1981

Background information
- Born: 12 February 1952
- Origin: England
- Died: 16 December 2012 (aged 60) Claremont, California
- Occupations: Musician, Bass guitarist, Vocalist, Keyboardist, and Composer

Val Haller (born Adrian Osborne) (12 February 1952 – 16 December 2012) was an English musician. Primarily a bass guitarist, he was also a vocalist, keyboardist, and composer. Haller played with Wayne County & the Electric Chairs, The Flying Lizards, The Lords of the New Church, Paint and Savage Republic. He was half of the duo Autumnfair.

== Career ==
Haller grew up in the west of England. An orphan, he was raised by a minister and his wife.

Haller's first venture into the music industry was promoting a Roxy Music concert in Chippenham in July 1972. He had the foresight to book the band for a low fee while they were relatively unknown. It was a great success.

In 1975, Haller moved to London and formed the Rockets, recruiting guitarist Andy Colquhoun later of the Pink Fairies.

Haller was a founding member of Wayne County & the Electric Chairs, the only constant member throughout the band's history. As part of the burgeoning punk scene bands were subject to gobbing and the band was forced to take a brief hiatus after Haller developed hepatitis as the result of a direct hit into his mouth.

Wayne County & The Electric Chairs released an EP Electric Chairs 1977, plus a single on Illegal Records. This was followed by "Fuck Off" / "on The Crest", recorded as a single for Safari Records and supported with a European tour. In 1978 the band released their first, self-titled album, as well as an EP, Blatantly Offensive'. The band performed the song "Paranoia Paradise" in the movie Jubilee, produced by Derek Jarman. Prior to the band's third album, Haller bought a synthesizer and began learning to play it. In subsequent rehearsal sessions with the group he would often play synthesizer or Farfisa organ instead of bass. After the band's third album, County departed, returning to the States.

The Electric Chairs continued as a three-piece, Haller (bass, keyboards, vocals), Henri Padovani (guitars, vocals) and John "JJ" Johnson (drums, percussion). A single, "So Many Ways" (on which Haller took lead vocals) / "J'attends Les Marines", was released in late 1979. The record, produced by David Cunningham, took a more electronic and atmospheric direction. However the band could not sustain themselves commercially, and fell out with management and label. The three former Electric Chairs then formed a new group, the Mystere Five's, with vocalist/guitarist Chris Reeves and non-musician Marc "Frenchy" Gloder. A single, "No Message" / "Shake Some Action", launched Gloder's label Flicknife Records. A second single, "Never Say Thank You" / "Heart Rules The Head" soon followed. Both were well received but by 1980 the band moved on to other projects. Haller contributed synthesizer to the Flying Padovanis debut single "Western Pasta" / "Vas Plus Haut", released in 1981 and formed Paint with vocalist Jonathan Hughston.

Paint never took off and Haller was soon recruited by The Lords of the New Church to play keyboards on a tour. On his return he joined Johnson in The Flying Lizards, playing bass on two songs on the 1981 Fourth Wall album, "In My Lifetime" and "A Train".

Haller relocated to Los Angeles in 1983, working as a motorcycle messenger to get by. Within a couple of years he hooked up with Thom Fuhrmann of Savage Republic to form the duo Autumnfair, who were accompanied by a revolving line up of Savage Republic associates. The band finished playing in 1989, however a 10" EP Glaciers And Gods was released in 1991. In 2002, an Autumnfair retrospective CD Autumnfair – 1986 - 1989 was released.

In 2007, Haller joined a reformed Savage Republic. An EP Siam was released, followed by an album 1938 and the band toured widely including the North East United States, Italy, Germany, Belgium, Poland and Greece.

In March 2010, Fuhrmann stated that AutumnFair would return to the studio to record.

== Death ==
Haller died on 16 December 2012, in Claremont, California.

== Discography ==
=== (Wayne County and the) Electric Chairs ===
- The Electric Chairs EP Illegal Records 1977
- "(If You Don't Wanna Fuck Me, Baby) Fuck Off!!" / "On The Crest" Single Sweet FA 1977
- The Electric Chairs LP Safari Records 1978
- Blatantly Offensive EP, Safari Records 1978
- "So Many Ways" / "J'attends Les Marines" 45 Safari Records 1979

=== Mystere 5's ===
- "No Message" / "Shake Some Action" Single Flicknife Records 1979
- "Never Say Thank You" / "Heart Rules The Head" Single Flicknife Records 1979

=== Flying Padovani's ===
- "Western Pasta" / "Vas Plus Haut" Single Demon Records 1981

=== Flying Lizards ===
- Fourth Wall LP Virgin 1981

=== Autumnfair ===
- Glaciers And Gods 10" EP Independent Project Records 1990
- 1986 - 1989 CD Mobilization Records 2002
