= Jayne County =

American singer, songwriter, actress and record producer (born 1947)

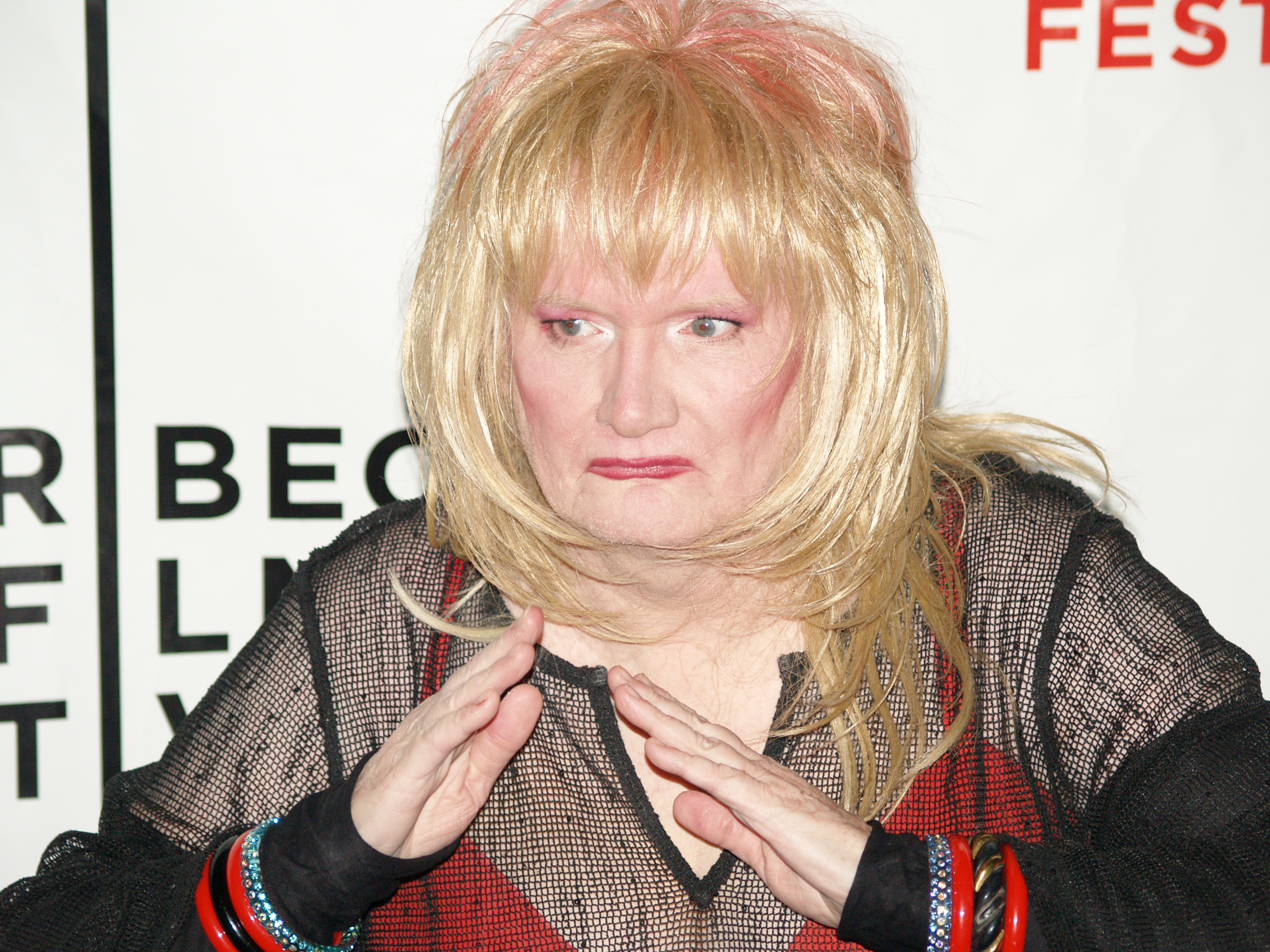
- County at the première of Squeezebox! at the 2008 Tribeca Film Festival

Background information
- Born: July 13, 1947 (age 79); Dallas, Georgia, US
- Genres: Proto-punk; glam punk; punk rock; blues rock; boogie-woogie
- Occupations: Musician; singer; songwriter; record producer; actress; DJ; Artist; Cat carer
- Instruments: Vocals; harmonica; percussion
- Labels: Safari; Attic; Revolver; Jungle; ESP; Royalty; Reble Rec; Fang; Get Back; Ratcage; Munster; Poptown; Captain Trip; Captain Oi!
- Website: jaynecounty.com

Jayne County (born July 13, 1947) is an American singer, songwriter, actress, record producer, and visual artist whose career has spanned six decades. Coming to prominence in the 1970s under the name Wayne County (inspired by Wayne County, Michigan), she was the vocalist of influential proto-punk band Wayne County & the Electric Chairs who became known for their campy and foul-mouthed ballads, glam punk inspired songs, and image which was heavily influenced by Jackie Curtis and the Theatre of the Ridiculous. County in particular was known for her outrageous and unpredictable stage antics as well as possessing a distinctive singing voice. She went on to become rock's first openly transgender singer in 1979 and adopted the stage name Jayne County.

County's music has encompassed a number of styles over the course of her career, including glam punk, punk rock, blues rock, and boogie-woogie. County did not think her birth name "sounded very glamorous" and decided to adopt the name of the county in which Detroit was located because she admired bands from that city "like Iggy [Pop] and all those people." County took part in the Stonewall riots prior to her career in music and acting began. Pianist Jools Holland's first studio outing was with County on her single "Fuck Off". She also appeared as an actress at Andy Warhol's Factory and had a brief association with David Bowie during the 1970s. County played Lounge Lizard in the second punk rock film, Derek Jarman's Jubilee, and the band performed "Paranoia Paradise", which also appeared on the Jubilee Soundtrack album, released by Polydor UK in 1978. Wayne County and the Electric Chairs were supported by The Police during their 1977 tour of Holland, later recruiting Police guitarist Henry Padovani on rhythm guitar.

Though County never found commercial success, she maintains a cult following and has been an influence on a number of musicians including David Bowie, the Ramones, Patti Smith, Pete Burns and Lou Reed, and many of County's songs have become well-known, including "Man Enough to Be a Woman", "Fuck Off", "Stuck on You," and "Night Time".

== Early years and education ==
County was born as Wayne Rogers to working-class parents in Dallas, Georgia. She was gender-nonconforming from a young age, wearing makeup at school. County left her hometown of Dallas in 1968 to move to Atlanta, then shortly after to New York City, where she became a regular at the Stonewall Inn and took part in the historic riots. In 1969, County was asked by Warhol superstar and playwright Jackie Curtis to appear in her play Femme Fatale. The play had a successful run at La MaMa Experimental Theatre Club and starred Patti Smith. In her autobiography, County says of Curtis, "She was my biggest influence, the person who really got me started."

== Career ==
=== 1970–1979 ===
After appearing in Femme Fatale, County wrote the play World – Birth of a Nation (The Castration of Man). The play was directed by Tony Ingrassia and promoted as a "homosexual fantasy." The play was set in a hospital and related to castration of the male sex. County played both Florence Nitingale and her sister Ethel Nitingale, and the play also featured Cherry Vanilla who played a nurse named Tilly Tons.

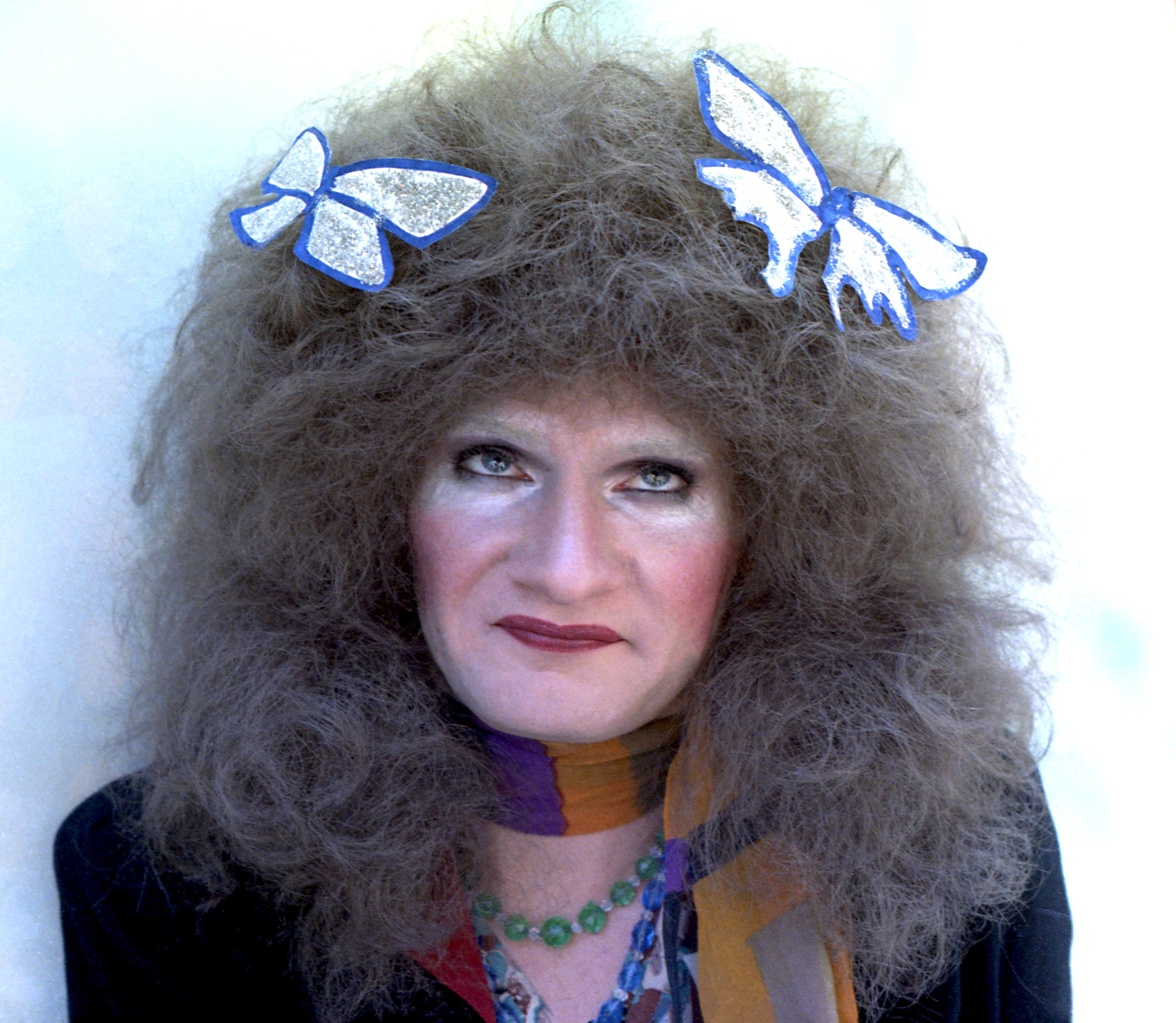
County in 1971

After seeing County in the play, Warhol cast her in his own theatrical production of Pork, which was adapted and directed by Tony Ingrassia. After a run in New York, the play was performed in London with the same New York cast. Upon returning to New York, County appeared in another play, Island by Tony Ingrassia, again with Patti Smith.

In 1972, County formed Queen Elizabeth, one of the pioneering proto-punk bands. County was signed to MainMan Artistes, David Bowie's management firm, but no records were ever produced. The company spent over $200,000 to film the 1974 stage show, "Wayne at the Trucks", but footage has never been released. The show featured numerous costume changes and some of County's raunchiest material. Eight songs from the show were released on the 2006 album "Wayne County at the Trucks", on Munster Records. County claims the show was the inspiration for Bowie's Diamond Dogs tour. In particular, County maintains that the song "Queenage Baby" was a prototype for Bowie's song "Rebel Rebel", a claim which is supported by some rock critics.

In 1974, County formed Wayne County and the Backstreet Boys, which recorded three tracks for Max's Kansas City: New York New Wave, a compilation that also featured Suicide, Pere Ubu, Cherry Vanilla and The Fast. Wayne County and The Backstreet Boys played regularly at CBGB and Max's Kansas City, where County was also a DJ. In 1976, she appeared in the film The Blank Generation, directed by Amos Poe and Ivan Kral. The film, the recording and the shows were the beginnings of what came to be known as punk rock, and helped define the movement.

In 1977, County moved to London, where the English punk scene was just emerging, and formed Wayne County & the Electric Chairs. County released the EP Electric Chairs 1977, plus a single on Illegal Records. This was followed by "Fuck Off", recorded as a single for Safari Records and supported with a European tour. While in London, County met Derek Jarman, who cast her as Lounge Lizard in the seminal punk film Jubilee, which also starred Adam Ant, Toyah Willcox, Ian Charleson, Little Nell and Jordan. County and band are also featured in The Punk Rock Movie, by Don Letts, containing part of a 1977 performance at The Roxy club in London.

In December 1978, the Wayne County song "Fucked by the Devil," was recorded by Jimi LaLumia and The Psychotic Frogs, and released the following year on their EP Typically Tasteless. It quickly sold 1,000 copies. Later on, LaLumia would work with County in a managerial position.

Shortly after this, Wayne County and The Electric Chairs recorded their first, eponymous album, as well as another EP, Blatantly Offensive, which contained "Fuck Off" and "Toilet Love." After their touring in support of these releases was done, they recorded Storm the Gates of Heaven. Their next album, released in 1979, was Things Your Mother Never Told You, which featured several songs based on County's experiences in Germany. The album was produced by David Cunningham. After it was released, the band broke up and County, along with guitarist Eliot Michael, returned to the U.S.

When County moved to Berlin in 1979, she changed her stage name to Jayne County, publicly identifying as a woman for the first time. County's 1980 release of Rock and Roll Resurrection (In Concert) on Attic Records was under this name. With Eliot Michael on guitar, Peter Jordan on bass, and Sammy Minelli on drums, the first live show under County's new name in Toronto sparked erroneous rumors of a sex-change operation.

=== 1980–present ===
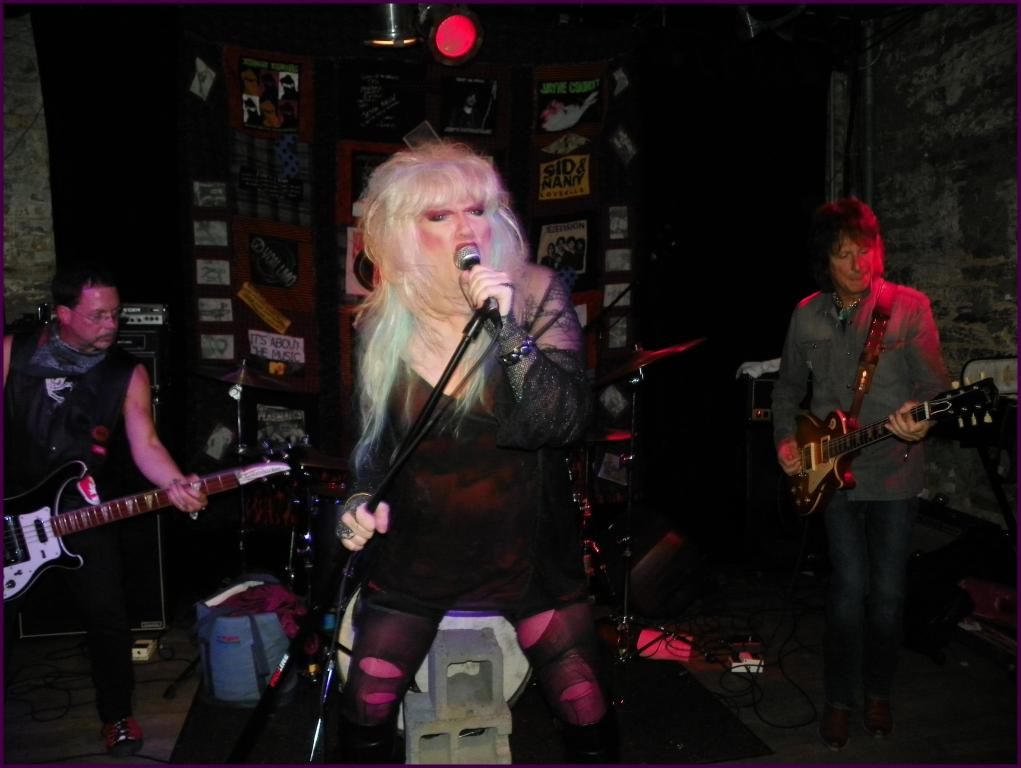
County performing with the Electric Chairs in 2012

In 1983, County returned to New York where she appeared in the theatrical production Les Girls with Holly Woodlawn. Shortly thereafter she returned to London for the première of the German film City of Lost Souls, released on February 5, 1983, in which she played Leila and staying long enough to record a new album. Warren Heighway befriended County in Manchester and became her UK manager. He put a band together to record County's debut studio album Private Oyster. The band members came from various rock bands from the Manchester area: Guitarist Richard Stuart Clarke, bassist Mark Pearson and drummer Bazz Creece. The album was recorded at Pennine Studios in Oldham and released on Revolver Records in 1986. To promote the album in the UK around this time County mainly used backing tapes.

1989 saw County release the mini album Betty Grables Legs and the single "Time Machine" on Jungle Records, recorded at Station House Studios in New Brighton with Mark Pearson on bass, Paul Wainwright on guitar and Kevin O'Brien on drums. Shows with this line-up put County back on the live circuit. Following widespread media attention, she returned to the U.S. where her manager for America, Jimi LaLumia, secured the future release of the album Goddess of Wet Dreams on the ESP DISK label; this became County's first U.S. release. Lalumia then secured a deal for County with the NY based label Royalty Records; Royalty released the UK based County compilation Rock & Roll Cleopatra, and the subsequent studio album Deviation. Royalty would later launch County's first and only major U.S. tour in support of the releases.

From 1990 onwards, many of County's earlier recordings were re-released, including the early Safari tracks, on a CD titled Rock & Roll Cleopatra. She recorded the album Goddess of Wet Dreams at Twilight Studios in Salford in 1993, followed by Deviation recorded at The Cutting Rooms in Crumpsall, Manchester in the autumn of 1994. Later that year, she appeared in Wigstock: The Movie and released her autobiography Man Enough to Be a Woman published by Serpent's Tail. A launch party was held at The Rock Garden in Covent Garden London on June 13, 1995, to promote both the book and the Deviation album.

From 1989 to 1997, Jayne County & The Electric Chairs consisted of County on vocals, Mark Pearson on bass, Paul Wainwright on guitar, and Colin Rocks on drums. This lineup recorded and toured both the UK and Europe during this time, with Warren Heighway acting as agent and Manchester Management for his "Trace Element Corporation" until his death on July 19, 2005.

Since that time, several new tracks have surfaced on various compilations and through County's official website. Many of these tracks, both live and studio recordings, were collected on the Ratcage Records release So New York, including collaborations with Lisa Jackson and former Electric Chairs guitarist Eliot Michael. A live show, recorded on County's birthday, was released on the 2002 CD Wash Me in the Blood (of Rock & Roll) – Live at Squeeze Box by Fang Records. The CD features a duet on "California Sun" by County and former nemesis "Handsome" Dick Manitoba of The Dictators. In 2005, Man Enough to Be a Woman, a live DVD, was released on Cherry Red Films recorded at Holidays in the Sun punk festival at Blackpool Winter Gardens on August 11, 1996.

After leaving New York City, County settled in the Atlanta area where she has a band called the Electrick Queers with guitarist Jet Terror, bassist Gary Yoxen, and drummer Rob Kirkland. In 2014 Safari Records released a CD/DVD of Live at Rockpalast from 1978. On July 22, 2015, Jayne County & the Electrick Queers headlined ARMageddon, to benefit Blast-Off Burlesque's Trey Chic.

On 23 September 2017, County released an EP by Jayne County and The JC5 titled Here Come the JC5.

In 2018, County debuted a retrospective show of visual art at Participant, Inc, a gallery in New York City. Comprising five decades of work, Paranoia Paradise included paintings, drawings, collages, and photography.

Jayne County's autobiography was republished by Serpent's Tail in May 2021.

== Works ==
=== Filmography ===
Year	Title	Director(s)
1975	Night Lunch	Ivan Kral and Amos Poe
1976	The Blank Generation	Ivan Kral and Amos Poe
1977	Punk in London	Wolfgang Büld
1977	The Punk Rock Movie	Don Letts
1978	Jubilee	Derek Jarman
1982	Stadt der verlorenen Seelen (City of Lost Souls)	Rosa von Praunheim
1995	Wigstock: The Movie	Barry Shils
1999	Born to Lose: The Last Rock and Roll Movie	Lech Kowalski
2001	Freaks, Glam Gods and Rock Stars	Tim Ryan
2003	End of the Century	Jim Fields and Michael Gramaglia
2007	King of Punk	Kenneth van Schooten
2008	Squeezebox!	Steven Saporito and Zach Shaffer
2009	Burning Down the House: The Story of CBGB	Mandy Stein
2010	Beautiful Darling	James Rasin
2012	Jobriath A.D.	Kieran Turner

=== Discography ===
Albums

Year	Title	Label
1978	The Electric Chairs	Safari
1978	Storm the Gates of Heaven	Safari
1979	Things Your Mother Never Told You	Safari
1980	Rock and Roll Resurrection (In Concert)	Safari/Attic Records Li
1982	Best of Jayne/Wayne County and the Electric Chairs	Safari
1986	Private Oyster	Revolver
1989	Betty Grable's Legs	Jungle
1993	Goddess of Wet Dreams	ESP
1993	Rock ' n ' Roll Cleopatra - Compilation	RPM Records
1995	Deviation	Royalty
1995	Let Your Backbone Slip! - Compilation	RPM Records
2002	Wash Me in the Blood (of Rock & Roll)- Live at Squeeze Box	Fang
2003	So New York	Ratcage
2006	Wayne County at the Trucks	Munster
2011	Safari Years Box - 3 CD	Captain Trip Records
2016	Goddess of Wet Dreams - The Legacy Edition	MVD
2016	Amerikan Cleopatra/Private Oyster - The Legacy Edition	MVD
2020	The Safari Years - 4 CD Box Set	Captain Oi!

Extended plays

Year	Title	Label
1976	Max's Kansas City 1976	Ram Stereo 1213
1977	The Electric Chairs	Illegal
1978	Blatantly Offensive	Safari
1995	(If You Don't Wanna Fuck Me Baby) Fuck Off!!	Royalty Records (12-inch EP)
2017	Here Come The JC5	Adrastea Music

Singles

Year	Title	Other artists	Label
1981	"Twist and Shout" / "Boys"	Jimi LaLumia & The Psychotic Frogs, also featuring Johnny Thunders and Cherry Vanilla	Beat This
1986	"San Francisco (Be Sure To Wear Some Flowers In Your Hair)"		Heighway Robbery Wreckords
1988	"Time Machine" / "Take a Detour"		Jungle Records
2004	"Man! I Feel Like A Woman"		Pure Power Records
2007	"Razor Clam"	She Wolves	Poptown Records
2007	"California Uber Alles"	She Wolves	Poptown Records
2013	"Hail Satan!"	Sharon Needles	Independent
2017	"Leave My Pussy Alone"	Jimi LaLumia	LaLumia Tunes
2018	"IGenderTy"		LaLumia Tunes
2020	"I Don't Fit in Anywhere"	with Am Taylor	Cleopatra Records
2021	"Imma Gonna Go to Hell When I Die"	with the Electrick Queers	Independent

=== Biography ===
- County, Jayne; Smith, Rupert (1996). Man Enough to Be a Woman: The Autobiography of Jayne County. Serpent's Tail. ISBN 1-85242-338-2.
  - Republished 2021, Serpent's Tail. ISBN 9781788166539
