= Taxidermy (disambiguation) =

Taxidermy is the stuffing and mounting of dead animals.

Taxidermy may also refer to:

- Taxidermy (Queenadreena album), 2000
- Taxidermy (Abney Park album), 2005
- Taxidermy (Sharon Needles album), 2015, or the title song
- "Taxidermy" (song), a song by White Lies

== See also ==
- Taxidermia, a 2006 Hungarian film
- Taxonomy
