= Deviation (Jayne County album) =

Studio album by Jayne County
- Released: 1995
- Recorded: Autumn of 1994
- Studio: Abraham Moss Studio (The Cutting Rooms), Manchester, England
- Genre: New wave; punk rock
- Label: Royalty
- Producer: Jayne County

Jayne County chronology
Goddess of Wet Dreams (1993)	Deviation (1995)	Wash Me in the Blood (of Rock & Roll)- Live at Squeeze Box (2002)

Professional ratings
Review scores
Source	Rating
AllMusic	3/5 stars
The Encyclopedia of Popular Music	2/5 stars

Deviation is an album by the American singer Jayne County. It was released in 1995 by Royalty Records in the USA, RPM Records in the UK and Rebel Rec (a division of SPV GmbH) in Europe. Outside of the US, the album was credited to Jayne County and The Electric Chairs, although none of the original Electric Chairs were on the recording.

The album recorded at Abraham Moss Studio (The Cutting Rooms) in Manchester, England, in the autumn of 1994.

A launch party was held on 13/6/1995 at The Rock Garden, Covent Garden London to promote the release of the album, which coincided with the release of County's autobiography Man Enough to be Woman.

== Critical reception ==
Billboard called the album "sublimely unsubtle," and praised "I'm in Love With Dusty Springfield" and "Texas Chainsaw Manicurist".

== Track listing ==
All tracks composed by Jayne County; except where indicated

US Release

1. "Transgender Rock 'N Roll"
2. "That's What the New Breed Say" (Maurizio Pozzi)
3. "Cherry Bomb" (Joan Jett, Kim Fowley)
4. "Deviation"
5. "I'm in Love with Dusty Springfield"
6. "Everyone's an Asshole But Me"
7. "Texas Chainsaw Manicurist"
8. "Little Star"
9. "Come on Down to My Boat" (Wes Farrell, Jerry Goldstein)
10. "Nuclear Age Vampires"
11. "That's What the New Breed Say (Psychedelic Mix)" (Maurizio Pozzi)

UK / European Release

1. "Transgender Rock 'N Roll"
2. "That's What the New Breed Say" (Maurizio Pozzi)
3. "Cherry Bomb" (Joan Jett, Kim Fowley)
4. "Deviation"
5. "I'm in Love with Dusty Springfield"
6. "Everyone's an Asshole But Me"
7. "That's What the New Breed Say (Psychedelic Mix)" (Maurizio Pozzi)
8. "Texas Chainsaw Manicurist"
9. "Little Star"
10. "Come on Down to My Boat" (Wes Farrell, Jerry Goldstein)
11. "Nuclear Age Vampires"

== Personnel ==
Credits are adapted from the album's liner notes.

- Jayne County – lead vocals; harmonica on "Come on Down to My Boat"
- Danny Ashberry – bass guitars
- Mik Grant – drums
- Andrew Von Melchior – keyboards
- Stuart Wilson – additional guitars on tracks 6/10/11
- Paul Wainwright – all other guitars; arrangement

Production

- Jayne County – producer; mixer
- Paul O'Brien – engineer
- Warren Heighway – mixer
