= Battle Axe (album) =

Studio album by Sharon Needles
- Released: October 6, 2017
- Genres: EDM, industrial pop, pop metal, indie pop
- Length: 44:02
- Label: Producer Entertainment Group

Sharon Needles chronology
Taxidermy (2015)	Battle Axe (2017)	Spoopy (2019)

Singles from Battle Axe
- 1. "Battle Axe" Released: October 6, 2017; 2. "Andy Warhol is Dead" Released: November 10, 2017

Battle Axe is the third studio album by American drag queen Sharon Needles. It was released on October 6, 2017 through Producer Entertainment Group.

== Promotion ==
The album was promoted by the singles "Battle Axe" and "Andy Warhol Is Dead". Both received accompanying music videos.

== Track listing ==
No.	Title	Length
1.	"Battle Axe"	2:56
2.	"Andy Warhol Is Dead"	3:01
3.	"666"	2:49
4.	"Black Licorice"	2:51
5.	"Jack-O-Lantern"	3:36
6.	"Brain Dead"	2:53
7.	"Dirty Diaper"	3:26
8.	"Rock n Roll, Pt. 3"	2:16
9.	"Electric Chair"	2:30
10.	"Cocaine & Fuck"	2:53
11.	"Piano Wire"	2:51
Total length:		44:02

== Charts ==
Chart (2017)	Peak position
US Dance/Electronic Album Sales (Billboard)	14
