= King of Punk =

King of Punk is a documentary film directed and produced by Kenneth van Schooten and Julie van Schooten. The documentary film includes interviews with members of bands involved in the punk scene between 1976 and 1982 including Ramones, Adicts, Exploited, Avengers, Dead Boys, UK Subs, Zeros, Wayne County & the Electric Chairs and many other artists. They talk about this music form and the music industry in general.

It also profiles OBGYN, an all-girl punk band based in Fayetteville, NC, and Patrick Clement, owner of Boston's FNS Publishing. The film's title, King of Punk, is based on one of OBGYN's song titles and doesn't refer to any one person.

The King of Punk documentary was released on DVD in 2007.

== Interviewees ==
Interviewees include:

- Shonna and Dave Ryan, Abrasive Wheels
- Keith 'Monkey' Warren, The Adicts
- Penelope Houston, Avengers
- Jack Rabid, Big Takeover
- Jayne County
- Cheetah Chrome, Dead Boys
- Joe Keithley, D.O.A.
- Wattie Buchan, The Exploited
- Dave Dictor and Ron Posner, MDC
- Marky Ramone, Ramones
- Dave Parsons, Sham69
- Jake Burns and Bruce Foxton, Stiff Little Fingers
- Sonny Vincent, Testors
- Charlie Harper, UK Subs
- Robert 'El Vez' Lopez, Zeros
