= Private Oyster =

Studio album by Jayne County
- Released: 1986
- Genre: Pop rock; new wave; punk rock
- Label: Revolver
- Producer: Jayne County

Jayne County chronology
Rock and Roll Resurrection (In Concert) (1980)	Private Oyster (1986)	Betty Grable's Legs (1989)

Professional ratings
Review scores
Source	Rating
AllMusic	3.5/5 stars

Private Oyster is the debut solo studio album by American singer Jayne County.Recorded at Pennine Studios Oldham, Greater Manchester, UK. Released on Revolver Records in 1986.

The back cover includes a dedication to fellow former Warhol superstar and playwright Jackie Curtis, who had died the previous year of a heroin overdose at the age of 38.

== Critical reception ==
In a retrospective review for AllMusic, critic Dave Thompson gave the album three and a half out of five stars and wrote that "Private Oyster's only real downfall lies in the less than lavish production that is draped across the grooves." He added that "the record still sounds good. But it should have been better."

== Track listing ==
All songs written and composed by Jayne County, except where noted.

Side one

1. "Private Oyster"
2. "Man Enough to Be a Woman"
3. "Fun in America"
4. "I Fell in Love With a Russian Soldier"
5. "Bad in Bed"
6. "Are You a Boy or Are You a Girl" (Geoffry Morris)

Side two

7. "When Queens Collide"
8. "Double Shot"
9. "Xerox That Man"
10. "The Lady Dye Twist"
11. "Love Lives On Lies"

== Personnel ==
Credits are adapted from the album's liner notes.

- Jayne County – lead vocals; percussion
- Richard Stuart Clark – lead guitars
- Mark Pearson – bass guitars
- Bazz Creese – drums
- Leee Black Childers – photography
- Gary Underhill – graphics
- Warren Heighway – management; producer
- Jayne County – producer
