= Fuck Off (song) =

1977 single by Wayne County & the Electric Chairs

Single by Wayne County & the Electric Chairs

from the album Blatantly Offenzive
- B-side: "On the Crest"
- Released: 1977
- Recorded: 1977
- Studio: Marquee Studios (London)
- Label: Sweet FA
- Songwriter: Jayne County
- Producer: Melvyn Slime

Wayne County & the Electric Chairs singles chronology
| "Fuck Off" (1977) | "Stuck on You" (1977) |

"Fuck Off", also released as "(If You Don't Wanna Fuck Me, Baby) Fuck Off!!", is the debut single by American-British rock band Wayne County & the Electric Chairs. It was released through Sweet FA, an imprint of Safari Records. The single's B-side was "On the Crest". Playing piano on the record was Jools Holland, then a session musician in his late teens. Described as "trashy, New York Dolls-influenced punk rock", the song was included in the book X-Rated: The 200 Rudest Records Ever!.

== Overview ==
The song begins with a boogie woogie feel, with the piano part played by a then-unknown Jools Holland. Toward the end of the song, however, the style changes to a punk rock style with a double-time feel. In his 2007 autobiography, Barefaced Lies and Boogie-woogie Boasts, Holland describes that on arriving at the recording session at Marquee Studios in London, he discovered that the group had recorded a backing track for the song but had written no lyrics. County asked him to play "really burlesque". Holland wrote that the first time he heard the song's lyrics was when playing the record to his mother, his younger brothers, and his aunt and uncle.

== Background ==
The song was written when Jayne County's band were still known as The Backstreet Boys. (Note: Not to be confused with the 1990s boy band of the same name) AllMusic describes the lyrics as County's way of "chastising those who won't take [her] home". Originally titled "(If You Don't Want to Fuck Me, Baby) Fuck Off", the song was planned to be released on the group's début album. The album was never released, though some tracks were included on 1976's Max's Kansas City. The following year, the band renamed themselves as "The Electric Chairs" and the song was included on the 1978 compilation album Man Enough to Be a Woman and the Blatantly Offenzive EP.

A dance remix of the song was released in the 1990s, remixed by Sleazesisters (DJ Pete Martine and Porl Young).

== Critical reception ==
The Encyclopedia of Popular Music described the song as "[an] enduring low-rent punk favourite", and the Encyclopedia of Punk Music and Culture described the single as "seminal".

== Personnel ==
- Vocals — Jayne County
- Guitar — Greg Van Cook
- Piano — Jools Holland
- Bass guitar — Val Haller
- Drums — J.J. Johnson
