= Wayne County & the Electric Chairs =

Punk band (1977–1979)

Jayne County & the Electric Chairs
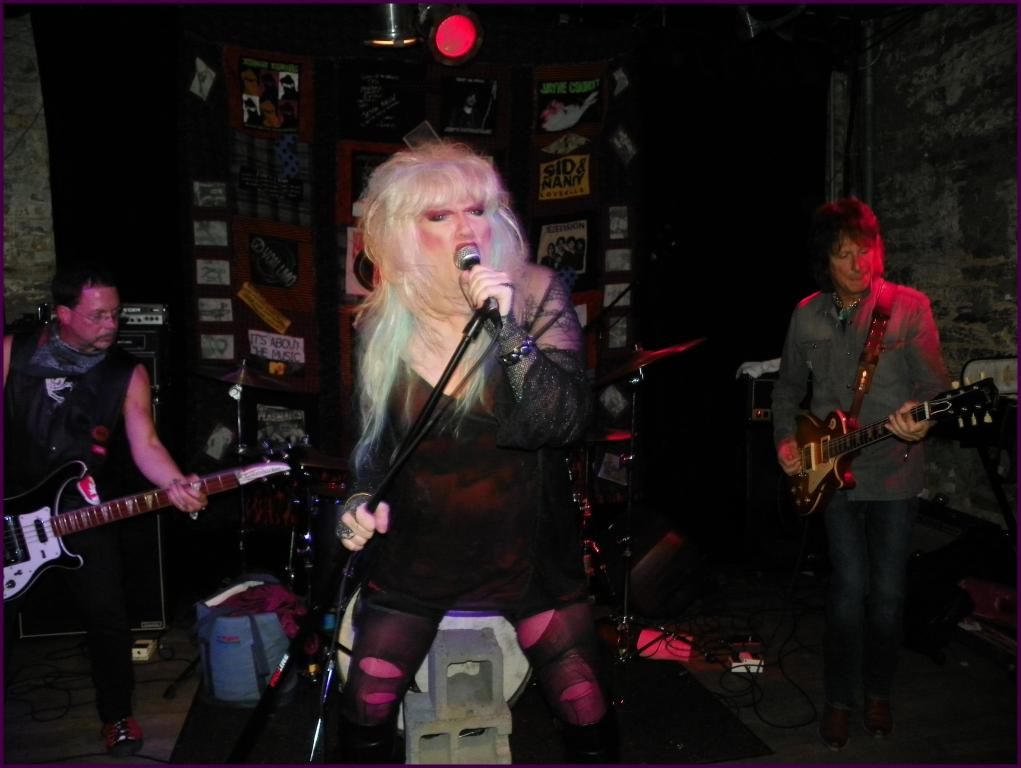
- Jayne County, 2012

Background information
- Origin: London, England
- Genres: Punk rock; glam punk
- Years active: 1977–1979
- Past members: Jayne County; Greg Van Cook; Val Haller; John Johnson; Eliot Michael; Henry Padovani

Wayne County & the Electric Chairs was an American-British rock band that was part of the first wave of punk bands from the 1970s. The band was headed by Georgia-born singer Jayne County (aka Wayne County) and became known for their campy, foul-mouthed ballads, glam punk inspired songs and image which was heavily influenced by Jackie Curtis and the Theatre of the Ridiculous.

== Career ==
Jayne County, then known as Wayne County, originally began performing in New York with a band called Queen Elizabeth. This was followed by Wayne County and The Backstreet Boys as documented on Rhino's DIY: Blank Generation compilation album with an early single: "Max's Kansas City 1976." Upon moving to London with Greg Van Cook, a member of the Backstreet Boys, she recruited a new drummer and bassist to form "The Electric Chairs"; a band comprising Van Cook (guitar), Val Haller (bass) and Chris Dust (drums).

Jools Holland had his first studio session with the group in 1976.

None of County's albums were ever released in her native United States except for three songs on the very early punk compilation Max's Kansas City.

Wayne County and the Electric Chairs were supported by the Police during their 1977 tour of Holland. Dust, a Hungarian, was deported following the band's return to the UK when the authorities found that his visa had expired over a year before. He was replaced by John "JJ" Johnson, and the band recorded their first album The Electric Chairs. In order to recreate the sound of the album live the band recruited Police guitarist, Henry Padovani on rhythm guitar.

This new five-piece line-up toured extensively, but County ultimately fired Greg Van Cook due to his rampant drug abuse and replaced him with Eliot Michael, another former member of the Backstreet Boys. Producer Martin Birch exerted a great deal of creative control over the band's second album Storm the Gates of Heaven and Padovani later commented in his memoir that the album "wasn't bad but it wasn't the Chairs as we wanted it to be." The band's third album Things Your Mother Never Told You was produced by David Cunningham. After a few more tours, Wayne County & the Electric Chairs split in two, with Eliot Michael following County in her solo career. Padovani, Haller, and Johnson recorded a final single: "So Many Ways" as The Electric Chairs before management problems forced them to disband completely.

County played "Lounge Lizard" in Derek Jarman's 1978 film Jubilee, performing "Paranoia Paradise" with the Electric Chairs. This track appeared on the Jubilee soundtrack album released by Polydor UK in 1978. County is featured in the 2013 film CBGB. The Wayne County and the Electric Chairs track "Out of Control" appears on the CBGB film soundtrack

The bootlegged 'live' appearance of Wayne County & the Electric Chairs in 1978 on the German TV show Rockpalast was released as a DVD/CD double pack by Repertoire Records UK in December 2014. The concert took place while the band were touring their second album Storm the Gates of Heaven".

== Discography ==
=== Albums ===
- The Electric Chairs (Safari, February 1978)
- Storm the Gates of Heaven (also released as Man Enough to Be a Woman) (Safari, August 1978)
- Things Your Mother Never Told You (Safari, May 1979)

=== Compilations ===
- Best of Jayne/Wayne County and the Electric Chairs (Safari, 1982)
- Rock 'n' Roll Cleopatra (RPM, 1993)
- Let Your Backbone Slip! (RPM, 1995)
- Safari Years Box (Captain Trip, 2011)
- The Safari Years – 4 CD Box Set (Captain Oi! 2020)

=== Singles and EPs ===
- Max's Kansas City: New York New Wave EP (1975)
- "Fuck Off" / "On the Crest" (Sweet FA Records, Nov 1977)
- "Thunder When She Walks" / "What You Got" (Illegal, 1977)
- "Eddie & Sheena" / "Rock'n'Roll Cleopatra" (Safari, February 1978)
- "Stuck on You" / "Paranoia Paradise" / "The Last Time" (Illegal, June 1978)
- "I Had Too Much to Dream Last Night" / "Fuck Off" (Safari, 1978)
- Blatantly Offenzive E.P. (Safari, 1978)
- "Trying to Get on the Radio" / "Evil Minded Mama" (Safari, August 1978)
- "Berlin" / "Waiting for the Marines" (Safari, June 1979)
- "So Many Ways" / "J'Attends Les Marines" (Illegal, 1979)

== Bibliography ==
- Man Enough to Be a Woman (ISBN 1-85242-338-2)

== Filmography ==
- 1976 The Blank Generation directed by Ivan Kral and Amos Poe
- 1977 Jubilee directed by Derek Jarman
- 1978 The Punk Rock Movie directed by Don Letts
- 1983 The City of Lost Souls directed by Rosa von Praunheim
- 2013 CBGB

== See also ==
- List of 1970s punk rock musicians
