= Sharon Needles =

American drag queen and recording artist (born 1981)

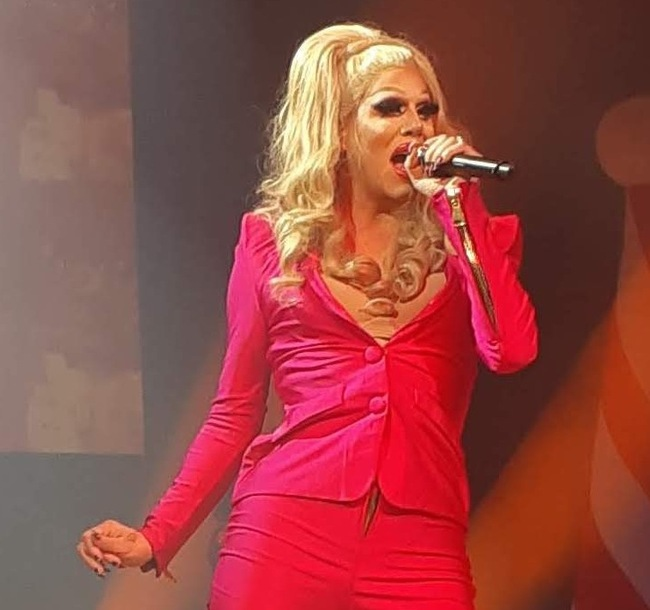
- Needles at Christmas Queens 2018
- Born: Aaron Robert Coady; November 28, 1981 (age 44); Newton, Iowa, U.S.
- Occupations: Drag performer; musician; actor
- Years active: 2004–present
- Known for: RuPaul's Drag Race (season 4) winner
- Musical career
- Genres: EDM; indie pop; pop rock; sadcore
- Instrument: Vocals
- Labels: Producer Entertainment Group; Sidecar Records
- Website: sharonneedles.com

Sharon Needles (born November 28, 1981) is the stage name of Aaron Robert Coady, an American drag performer and recording artist. Needles rose to international attention on the fourth season of the Logo reality competition series RuPaul's Drag Race, where she quickly became a fan favorite and was subsequently crowned "America's Next Drag Superstar" in April 2012.

After winning Drag Race, Needles released her debut album PG-13 in January 2013. It debuted at number 186 on the Billboard 200 and number nine on Dance/Electronic Albums. Later, Needles released the US Dance/Electronic chart top-ten albums Taxidermy (2015), Battle Axe (2017), Spoopy (2019), and Absolute Zero (2022).

In the late 2010s and early 2020s, Needles was subject to marked criticism in response to allegations of racially insensitive behavior and sexual misconduct.

== Early life ==
Aaron Coady was born in Newton, Iowa to Joan Coady. Coady is of Irish descent and was raised Catholic. At age four, he began wearing high-heels and dressing up with the encouragement of his parents. His years growing up in Iowa was a difficult time as he faced severe anti-gay and anti-"outsider" harassment, which prompted him to drop out of Newton High School. He began doing drugs at an early age, later being convicted for a DUI and assault on a police officer. He stated, "I started drugs really early and sneaking out and sleeping with boys and not coming home for weeks on end."

Coady began doing drag in 1997 and, in 2004, he moved to Pittsburgh, Pennsylvania, where he began working as a professional drag performer with the stage name Sharon Needles (a pun on the phrase "sharin' needles") in nightclubs and various other venues with the drag troupe "the Haus of Haunt", which Needles describes as "one punk rock, messy mash up of very talented, fucked up weirdos".

== Career ==
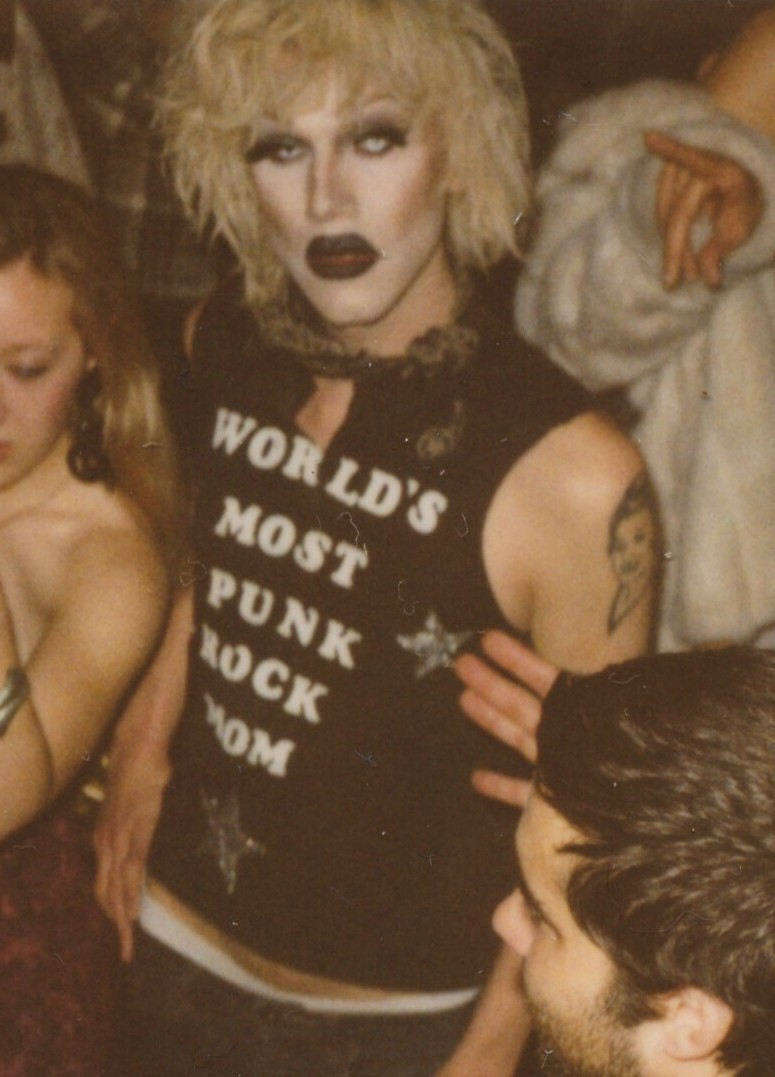
Needles in May 2012

In November 2011, it was announced that Needles had been selected to compete as a contestant on the fourth season of RuPaul's Drag Race. The season premiered on January 30, 2012, and with Needles winning the first challenge she became an instant stand-out for her "ghoulish" fashion sense and unconventional make-up choices. On the night of the premiere episode, Entertainment Weekly columnist Tanner Stransky hailed Needles' macabre style as "drop dead genius" and rhetorically asked "Is Sharon Needles the most 'sickening' (a drag term for 'fabulous') contestant ever?"

Throughout the fourth season of Drag Race, Needles endeared herself to audiences and became a favorite of the media, judges, and viewers alike for her quick wit, confidence, humility and uniqueness, as well as for her "transgressive" aesthetic. On March 27, 2012, Lady Gaga tweeted – "Sharon Needles looks FABULOUS 2night on drag race. Very Born This Way outfit/fame monster wig. Any rentals for my tour? #needthatbodysuit." Needles herself admitted that she was ambivalent in believing that she could win, stating, "(B)eing a comedic, campy, shtick queen and seeing how far those types of queens made it in past seasons, I would have been shocked if I made it past the first day."

In a departure from previous seasons of Drag Race, where rumors of previous winners had leaked before the final episodes could air, the decision was made not to pre-tape the finale episode announcing the season's winner. Instead, RuPaul decided to give fans an opportunity to voice their opinions as to who should win before taping of the final episode on April 25, 2012. For the taping, three outcomes were filmed announcing each of the "final 3" as the winner, with the true outcome only known to RuPaul and a select few involved in the editing. The finale episode aired on April 30, 2012, when it was announced that Needles had been crowned "America's Next Drag Superstar".

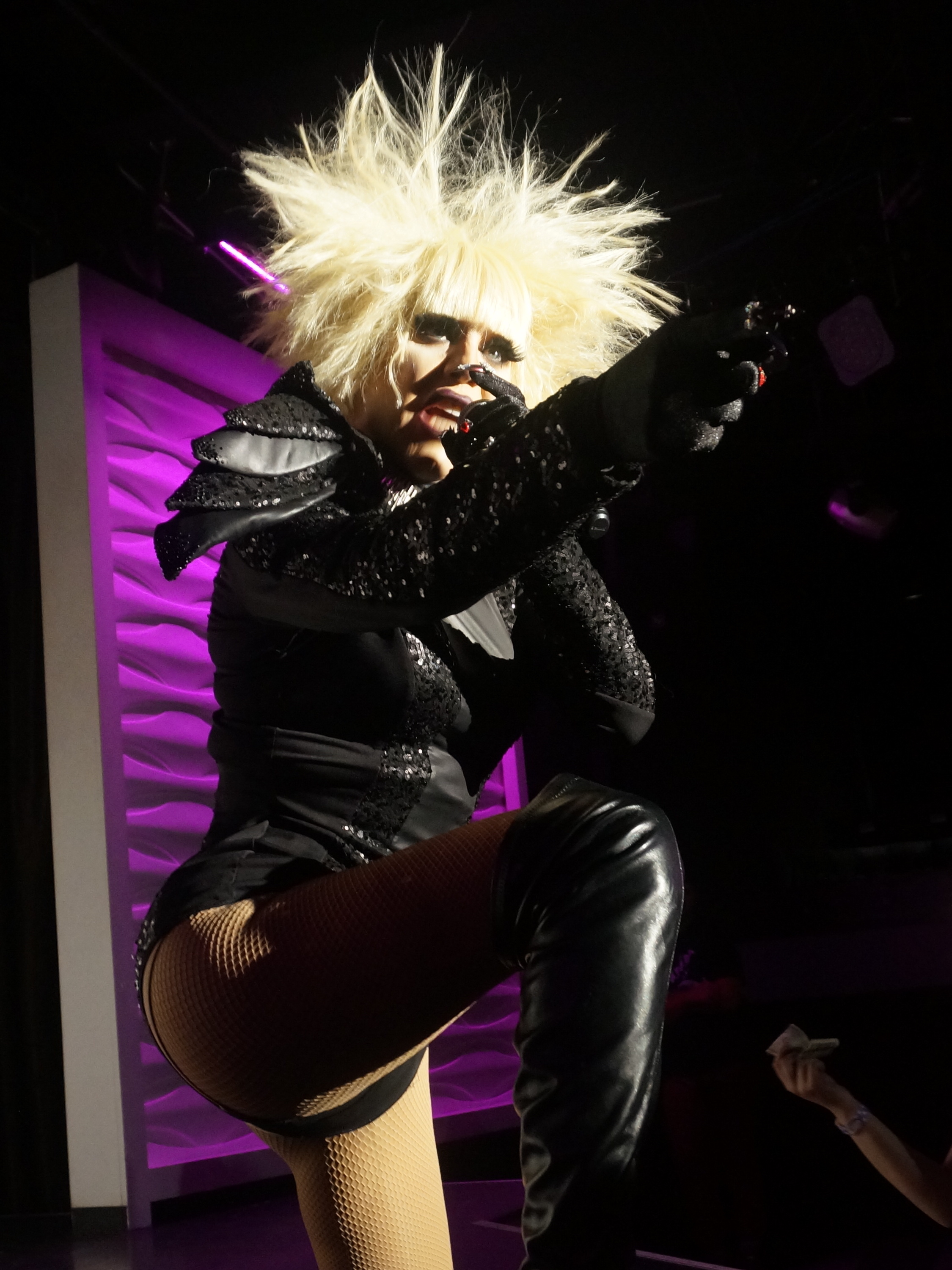
Needles performing in March 2017

In June 2012, Needles won the Facebook vote to appear as a contestant on RuPaul's Drag Race: All Stars, but declined, as the reigning champion, to participate in the competition. She also confirmed that her replacement in the competition would be fellow RuPaul's Drag U professor and the runner-up in the Facebook voting, Pandora Boxx. Needles became a horror host in October 2012 when she began presenting horror and suspense films airing on the Logo network under the series title Fearce! Needles also became the face of an advertising campaign by the People for the Ethical Treatment of Animals promoting vegetarianism, appearing on billboards throughout the United States. In June 2012, the Pittsburgh City Council issued an official proclamation declaring June 12, 2012, "Sharon Needles Day."

On January 29, 2013, Needles released her debut studio album PG-13, which debuted at number 186 on the US Billboard 200 chart, selling 3,000 copies in its first week. In April 2013, Needles was featured on the single "RuPaulogize," from Willam Belli's debut album The Wreckoning.

In September 2015, Needles released "Dracula" as the lead single from her second studio album. Needles released her second studio album titled Taxidermy on October 31, 2015. The second single, released on August 5, 2016, was "Hollywoodn't". The music video was once again directed by Santiago Felipe and explored the dark side of Hollywood. In the video, Needles portrayed Elizabeth Short, a.k.a. the Black Dahlia, Sharon Tate and Jayne Mansfield. Her third studio album, Battle Axe, debuted on October 6, 2017, along with a video for the single of the same name. The second single from the album was "Andy Warhol Is Dead", released on November 5, 2017. She contributed to the compilation album Christmas Queens 3 (2017).

Sharon Needles was also voted the "Best Drag Performer" of Pittsburgh 2015 by the staff of the Pittsburgh City Paper.

== Controversies ==
Needles has had a history of using racist language. She boasted about her use of the N word in a Facebook comment, though later claimed the comment was a forgery. She has also done blackface and has worn t-shirts with controversial symbols.

In 2021, The Daily Beast reported an account from a former fan of Needles who alleged that Needles had been "physically abusive, encouraged self-harm, and sent them child porn when they were underage". Needles denied the allegations through a legal representative.

A former Drag Race producer named Needles as one of three former queens to be "one hundred percent banned" from the franchise, in part due to her racism and other allegations against her.

== Personal life ==
Needles was raised Catholic. He struggles with alcohol and drug abuse.

Needles was in a four-year relationship with fellow RuPaul's Drag Race contestant Justin Honard, better known by his stage name, Alaska Thunderfuck; they ended their relationship in 2013 but remained friends.

Needles was also in a long-term relationship with special FX artist Chad O'Connell. The two began dating in late 2013 and got engaged in 2015. They broke up in summer 2020.

Needles lives in Pittsburgh, Pennsylvania.

== Discography ==
=== Studio albums ===
Title	Details	Peak chart positions		
Title	Details	US	US Dance	US Indie
PG-13	Released: January 29, 2013; Label: Self-released; Formats: CD, LP, digital download	186	9	25
Taxidermy	Released: October 31, 2015; Label: Sidecar Records, Producer Entertainment Group; Formats: CD, digital download	—	11	—
Battle Axe	Released: October 6, 2017; Label: Producer Entertainment Group; Formats: CD, LP, digital download	—	— (Note: Battle Axe did not enter the main Billboard Dance/Electronic Albums chart, but peaked at number 18 on the Billboard Dance/Electronic Album Sales chart.)	—
Absolute Zero	Released: July 22, 2022; Label: Producer Entertainment Group; Formats: digital download, LP	_	3	_

=== Extended play ===
Title	Details
Spoopy	Released: October 11, 2019; Label: Producer Entertainment Group; Formats: Digital download

=== Singles ===
Title	Year	Album
"Why Do You Think You Are Nuts?"	2013	PG-13
"Dressed to Kill"	2014	PG-13
"I Wish I Were Amanda Lepore" (featuring Amanda Lepore)	2014	PG-13
"Dracula"	2015	Taxidermy
"Hollywoodn't"	2016	Taxidermy
"Battle Axe"	2017	Battle Axe
"Andy Warhol Is Dead"	2017	Battle Axe
"#Liftmeup" (with Greko, Debbie Harry, Amanda Lepore, and Peppermint)	2019	Non-album single
"Lift Them Up 2020" (with Greko, Debbie Harry, Amanda Lepore, and Peppermint)	2020	Non-album single
"Absolute Zero"	2022	Absolute Zero
"Flamin' Hot"	2022	Absolute Zero

=== Other appearances ===
Song	Year	Other Artist(s)	Album
"RuPaulogize"	2013	Willam Belli	The Wreckoning
"Supermodel Inc."	2014	Super Electric Party Machine	Super Electric Party Machine
"Jingle Bells"	2015	N/A	Christmas Queens
"Snow Machine"	2016	N/A	Christmas Queens 2
"The Murder of the Lawson Family"	2017	N/A	Christmas Queens 3
"I Don't Give a F**k"	2018	Jiggly Caliente	T.H.O.T. Process
"Brothers in Our World"	2018	N/A	Christmas Queens 4

=== Music videos ===
Song	Year	Director
"This Club Is a Haunted House"	2013	Michael Sharkey
"Call Me on the Ouija Board"	2013	Santiago Felipe
"Why Do You Think You Are Nuts?"	2013	Marina Pfenning & Tony Balko
"Dressed to Kill"	2014	Ben Simkins
"I Wish I Were Amanda Lepore"	2014	Ben Simkins
"Dracula"	2015	Santiago Felipe
"Jingle Bells"	2015	Steve Willis
"Hollywoodn't"	2016	Santiago Felipe
"Battle Axe"	2017	Santiago Felipe
"Andy Warhol Is Dead"	2017	Ben Simkins
"666"	2018	Ben Simkins
"Monster Mash"	2019	Brad Hammer
"Absolute Zero"	2022	Assaad Yacoub
"Flamin’ Hot"	2022	Assaad Yacoub

== Filmography ==
=== Film ===
Year	Title	Role	Notes	Ref.
2019	The Queens	Herself	Documentary	

=== Television ===
Year	Title season	Role	Notes	Ref.
2012	RuPaul's Drag Race	Herself	Season 4 - Winner	
2012	RuPaul's Drag Race: Untucked	Herself		
2012	RuPaul's Drag U	Herself		
2012–2013	Fearce!	Herself	Logo TV original	
2013	Watch What Happens: Live	Herself	Season 9, Episode 67: "Laura Linney & John Benjamin Hickey"	
2013	She's Living for This	Herself	Season 2, Episode 1	
2016	RuPaul's Drag Race	Herself	Season 8, Episode 1	
2017	Good Behavior	Tonya Hardon	Season 2, Episode 5, "You Could Discover Me".	

=== Music videos ===
Year	Title	Artist	Ref.
2012	"Glamazon"	RuPaul	
2013	"RuPaulogize"	Willam	
2013	"You Seemed Shady"	Pandora Boxx & Adam Barta	
2015	"Hieeee"	Alaska Thunderfuck	
2019	"Scores"	Kahanna Montrese	

=== Web series ===
Year	Title	Role	Notes	Ref.
2013	RuPaul Drives	Herself	Guest	
2013	Ring My Bell	Herself	Guest	
2013	Sharon Needles' Horroscope	Herself	Host	
2013	Pure Camp	Herself	Co-Host, alongside Alaska Thunderfuck	
2013	Cooking with Needles	Herself	Host	
2014	WOW Shopping Network	Herself	Guest	
2014	Alyssa's Secret	Herself	Guest	
2014	Let the Music Play	Herself	Guest	
2015	Drag Queens React	Herself	Episode: Drag Queens Reading Mean Comments - Part 3	
2016	Bestie$ for Ca$h	Herself	Guest, with Heklina	
2017	COSMO Queens	Herself	Guest	

== Notes ==
Awards and achievements
Preceded by Raja	Winner of RuPaul's Drag Race; US season 4	Succeeded by Jinkx Monsoon
