= PG-13 (album) =

Studio album by Sharon Needles
- Released: January 29, 2013
- Genres: Dance-pop; electropop; punk
- Length: 43:01
- Label: Self-released
- Producer: Tomas Costanza

Sharon Needles chronology
PG-13 (2013)	Taxidermy (2015)

Singles from PG-13
- 1. "Why Do You Think You Are Nuts?" Released: November 26, 2013; 2. "This Club is a Haunted House" Released: January 28, 2013; 3. "Dressed to Kill" Released: February 11, 2014; 4. "I Wish I Were Amanda Lepore" Released: September 23, 2014

PG-13 is the debut studio album by American drag queen Sharon Needles, released on January 29, 2013. It included a cover of Ministry's 1984 single "(Every Day Is) Halloween". The album is a dance-pop and punk album, with elements of metal and electronica.

== Reception ==
Fred Thomas from AllMusic praised the album, saying "PG-13, is an apt reflection of his macabre personality, blending club pop beats with tongue-in-cheek takes on horror movie topics, often blurring the lines between terror and sexuality. Highlights of the album include the energetic 'This Club Is a Haunted House', featuring a cameo by RuPaul, and 'I Wish I Were Amanda Lepore', featuring none other than Amanda Lepore." PG-13 debuted at number 186 on the US Billboard 200 chart, selling 3,000 copies in its first week.

== Track listing ==
No.	Title	Writer(s)	Length
1.	"This Club Is a Haunted House" (featuring RuPaul)		4:19
2.	"Call Me on the Ouija Board"		3:21
3.	"Dead Girls Never Say No"		3:05
4.	"Drink Till I Die"		3:14
5.	"I Wish I Were Amanda Lepore" (featuring Amanda Lepore)		3:48
6.	"Why Do You Think You Are Nuts?"	The Penny Magic Show	2:57
7.	"Disco Ball"		3:52
8.	"Dressed to Kill"		3:27
9.	"Let's All Die"		3:11
10.	"Kai Kai" (featuring Ana Matronic and Alaska Thunderfuck)		3:25
11.	"Everyday Is Halloween" (featuring Armen Ra)	Al Jourgensen	5:21
12.	"Hail Satan!" (featuring Jayne County)		3:31
Total length:			43:01

== Charts ==
Chart (2013)	Peak position
US Billboard 200	186
US Dance/Electronic Albums (Billboard)	9
US Heatseekers Albums (Billboard)	4
US Independent Albums (Billboard)	25
