= Henry Padovani =

French musician (born 1952)

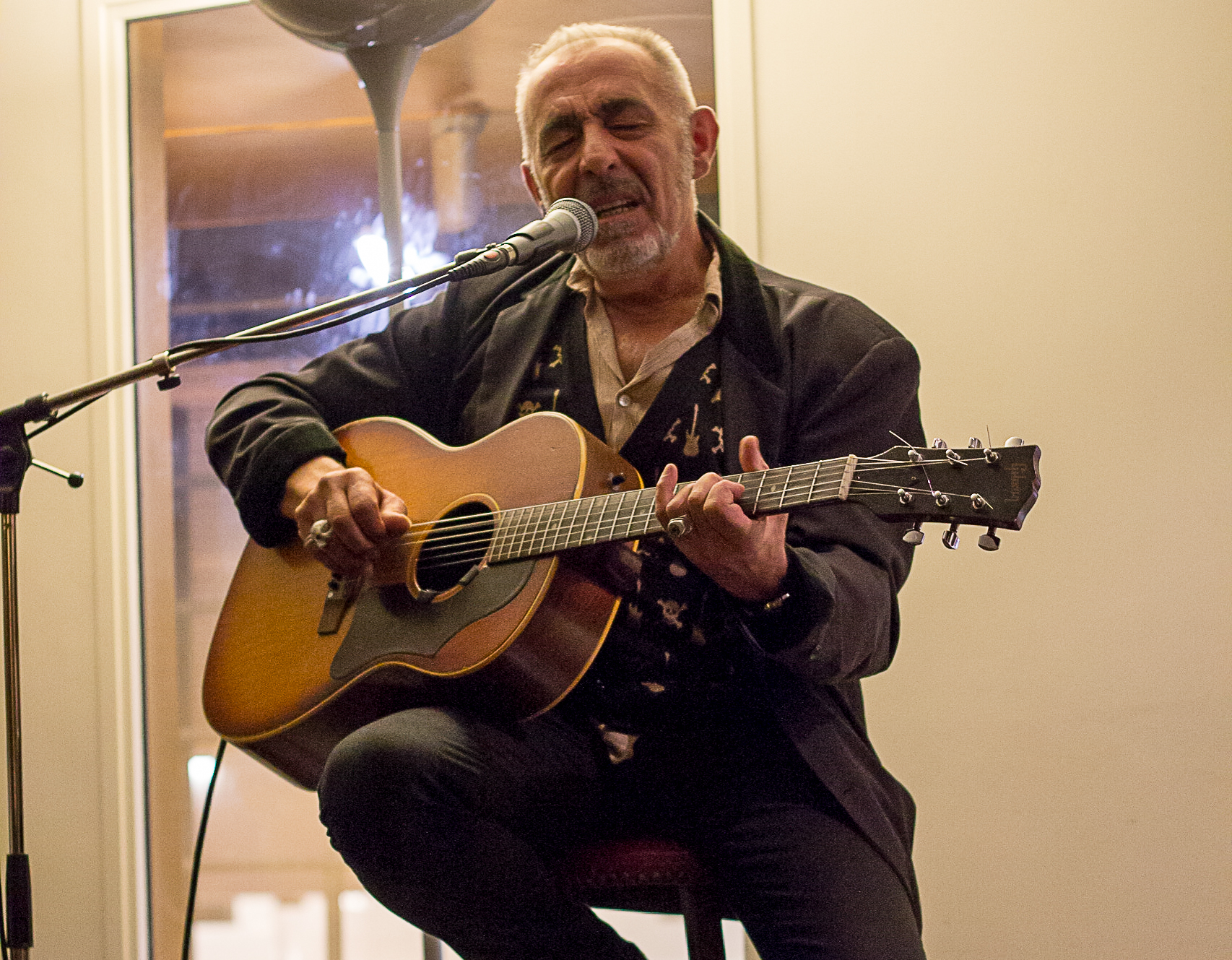
- Padovani performing in 2016

Background information
- Born: Henri Padovani; 14 October 1952 (age 74); Bastia, Corsica, France
- Genres: Post-punk; new wave; punk rock; reggae; instrumental rock
- Occupations: Musician; songwriter; producer
- Instruments: Guitar; vocals; piano
- Years active: 1972–present
- Formerly of: The Police; Wayne County & the Electric Chairs; The Flying Padovanis

Henry (or Henri) Padovani (born 14 October 1952) is a French musician noted for being the original guitarist of English rock band the Police. He was a member of the band from January to August 1977 and was replaced by Andy Summers, who had originally been part of the band as a second guitarist. Following his departure from the band, Padovani was handed the rhythm guitar spot with Wayne County & the Electric Chairs, before forming his own band, the Flying Padovanis.

== Biography ==
=== Early life and punk years ===
Henri Padovani grew up between Algeria and Corsica from Santo-Pietro-di-Venaco. While studying Economics at Aix-en-Provence, he began listening to Jimi Hendrix and was inspired to form his own band, Lupus, made up of various school friends. After meeting The Flamin’ Groovies at a performance in a university lecture hall, Padovani joined the band for a drink and they encouraged him to see them perform in London. He moved to London in December 1976, where a friend took him to one of Curved Air's last gigs. Though unimpressed by the performance, afterward he ended up talking with the band's American expatriate drummer Stewart Copeland, who showed him some songs he had been writing and introduced him to the rising punk scene. After a show at the Roxy Club, Padovani decided he wanted to join a punk band and shaved off his waist-length hair and beard. He then auditioned for the band London and was offered the job.

However, when he told Copeland of his plans, Copeland petitioned him to join his own new band, the Police. Copeland was already under the impression he had convinced singer and bassist Sting to join, but, despite heavy use of word of mouth and advertisements in musical publications, Padovani was the only guitarist he could find who was interested in punk and had actual playing ability. Copeland later recalled of Henry Padovani:

He couldn't speak much English but he'd picked up some musicians' slang and he used to say 'Where can I put my homp (amplifier)? or 'where do I put my rope (lead)?'. He knew a few chords and he was really enthusiastic and when he'd had his hair cut and stuff he really looked the part. I mean, he could play guitar better than I could and I could play guitar better than Joe Strummer... well, in those days. So I reckoned he'd be OK but I didn't figure Sting would see it that way...

With Sting on lead vocals and bass guitar, Padovani on lead guitar and Copeland doubling on rhythm guitar as well as drums, the Police recorded in February 1977 their first single "Fall Out" b/w "Nothing Achieving" which the band released on 1 May 1977. However, Sting was dissatisfied with Padovani's technical abilities, paving the way for Andy Summers, whom they met after a brief tour as part of Mike Howlett's band Strontium 90. For a brief period in July and August 1977, the Police performed as a four-piece with Padovani and Summers sharing guitar duties. Having insisted from the start that he wanted to be the sole guitarist for the band, Summers was unhappy with the situation. Padovani himself felt that the disparity in technical ability between the two of them made this an awkward lineup. The night after an aborted studio session with former Velvet Underground multi-instrumentalist John Cale in the producer's chair, Copeland called Padovani and asked him to leave the band.

After taking a two-month vacation in Corsica, Padovani returned to London and was immediately handed the rhythm guitar spot with Wayne County & the Electric Chairs, who at the time were far better known than the Police. The Police were actually their support act in 1977. The band's first album with Padovani, Storm the Gates of Heaven, was also his debut as a songwriter. Besides a pair of group compositions, he wrote the music for the song "Cry of Angels". After one more album, Things Your Mother Never Told You, Wayne County & the Electric Chairs split in two. Padovani remained with bassist Val Haller and drummer J.J. Johnson, and the trio recorded a final single, "So Many Ways", as simply the Electric Chairs, before management problems forced them to disband completely. During this period, Padovani and Haller took turns on lead vocals.

=== New directions ===
The collaboration among Padovani, Haller, and Johnson did not end with the breakup of the Electric Chairs. In 1980, they put together a band called The Mystere Five's, (Note: The rendering of "Five" in the band's name is inconsistent, even on their records. Sometimes the word "five" is used, sometimes the Arabic numeral, and sometimes the Roman numeral. However, the unexplained apostrophe always appears in official spellings of the name.) which consisted of the three of them as well as Chris Reeves, who played guitar. Marc "Frenchie" Gloder, who had no performance role in the band but wrote all the lyrics, designed the sleeves to their records, and owned the record label. All the members except Gloder did lead vocals. The group used a deliberately anonymous image, never crediting individual members. Except for a cover of "Shake Some Action" by Flamin' Groovies, all their songs were credited as being written and produced by the group as a whole.

The Mystere Five's recorded two indie singles that were released in 1980, "Shake Some Action" b/w "No Message" and "Never Say Thank You" b/w "Heart Rules the Head". Both were successful, receiving good reviews (New Musical Express called the first single "A perfect record" and later reviewed the second single as being "actually better"), high placings in the indie charts, and a good deal of radio play.

However, by the time the singles were released, the band members had moved to other projects, with Padovani having formed The Flying Padovanis. This new band released the double A-sided single "Western Pasta" b/w "Vas plus haut" (1981).

In 1983 Henry Padovani met former Clash drummer Topper Headon, who had been recently fired from The Clash due to his heroin addiction. They decided to form a band, Samurai. Padovani and Headon recruited Pretenders bassist Pete Farndon, who had just been fired from The Pretenders due to his drug addiction. Former Deaf School vocalist Steve Allan and organist Mick Gallagher were also tapped to join Samurai. Unfortunately, the band would never record anything due to Farndon losing consciousness and drowning in his bath because of a heroin overdose.

The Flying Padovanis recorded an EP, Font L'Enfer, and an album, They Call Them Crazy, before disbanding at the end of 1987. In 1988, Henri took part in the recording of Johnny Thunders and Patti Palladin's Copy Cats album which also featured Jayne County on backing vocals. In 1988, Miles Copeland III, The Police's manager, and elder brother of Stewart Copeland, appointed Padovani as Vice President of IRS Records, a role he performed until 1994 while also managing the Italian musician Zucchero.

After a five-year sabbatical, Padovani returned to guitar playing. In 1998 he contributed to a Johnny Thunders tribute album by performing "Cosa Nostra". He recorded a solo album, À croire que c'était pour la vie, in 2007 with record producer Yves Aouizerate. The album was sung in French, and both Stewart Copeland and Sting played on the track "Welcome Home", representing the first time that the original members of the Police had recorded together since "Fall Out". Manu Katché, Steve Hunter, Glen Matlock and Chris Musto (of the Flying Padovanis) also appeared on the album.

Padovani also wrote the score for the films La Vie comme elle va (2005) and Ici Najac, à vous la Terre (2006 Cannes Film Festival official selection). In 2006 he published his autobiography Secret Police Man, recounting episodes of his lifestyle in the late 1970s and the early days of the Police.

Padovani was a judge for the spring 2011 season of X Factor in France, on the television channel M6.

In 2017 he produced and starred in the rockumentary Rock'n'roll... Of Corse!. It features contributions by Sting, Stewart Copeland, Andy Summers, Topper Headon, Mick Jones, Glen Matlock and Kim Wilde among others. The film was directed by Lionel Guedj and Stephane Bebert.

=== Band reunions ===
The Flying Padovanis reformed in 2007 for an album made of old and new material, Three for Trouble released in May that year, followed by a tour which included an appearance at the Fuji rock festival in Japan. The band now plays regular dates in London and France.

During the 2007 The Police Reunion Tour, Padovani joined the band on stage for the final encore of their show in Paris on 29 September. The Police as a four-piece played "Next to You" from the band's first album Outlandos d'Amour.

In 2017 Padovani performed a solo gig on acoustic guitar and vocals for the Festa in Lisula in Corse. A recording of the event was later issued under the title Live in Fericy.

== Discography ==
=== Studio albums ===
==== As a solo artist ====
- À croire que c'était pour la vie – (2007)
- I Love Today – (2016)
- Live in Fericy – (2019)
- Corsican Gumbo – (2022)

==== With the Flying Padovanis ====
- Font L'Enfer – (1982)
- They Call Them Crazy – (1987)
- Three for Trouble – (2007)
- Live at the 100 Club – (2008)

==== With Wayne County & the Electric Chairs ====
- Storm the Gates of Heaven – (1978)
- Things Your Mother Never Told You – (1979)

==== With the Police ====
- Message in a Box: The Complete Recordings (2003)
- The Police (2007) (#3 UK Albums; #11 US Billboard 200)

=== Singles ===
==== As a solo artist ====
- "La Vie Comme Elle Va"/"A Vous La Terre" (2004)
- "Welcome Home" (Radio version)/"Welcome Home" (Album version) (2006)

==== With the Flying Padovanis ====
- "Western Pasta"/"Vas Plus Haut" – (1981)

==== With the Police ====
- "Fall Out"/"Nothing Achieving" – (1977) (#47 UK Singles)

==== With Wayne County & the Electric Chairs ====
- "Trying to Get on the Radio"/"Evil Minded Momma" (1978)
- "So Many Ways"/"J'Attend Les Marines" – (1979)

==== With the Mystere Five's ====
- "Never Say Thank You"/Heart Rules the Head" (1980)
- "No Message"/"Shake Some Action" (1980)

=== Compilation albums ===
- I Only Play R&R for Kids to Dance: Tribute to Johnny Thunder – (1998)

=== Videography ===
- Reggatta de Blanc (2007)
- Rock'n Roll... Of Corse! (2017)
