= Taxidermy (Sharon Needles album) =

Studio album by Sharon Needles
- Released: October 31, 2015
- Genre: EDM
- Length: 37:23
- Labels: Sidecar Records, Producer Entertainment Group

Sharon Needles chronology
PG-13 (2014)	Taxidermy (2015)	Battle Axe (2017)

Singles from Taxidermy
- 1. "Dracula" Released: October 31, 2015; 2. "Hollywoodn't" Released: August 5, 2016

Taxidermy is the second studio album by American drag queen Sharon Needles. It was released on October 31, 2015 by Sidecar Records and Producer Entertainment Group, her first album on either label.

== Background and promotion ==
Taxidermy is a departure from the "punk, metal, and electronica" of her previous album, PG-13, and marks a turn to straight EDM. Two singles were released to promote the album, "Dracula" on October 31, 2015 and "Hollywoodn't" on August 5, 2016. Both received accompanying music videos.

== Tracklist ==
No.	Title	Length
1.	"Dracula"	3:13
2.	"Dead Dandelion"	3:15
3.	"Taxidermy"	3:24
4.	"Hollywoodn't"	3:24
5.	"Supernature"	4:18
6.	"Lucy"	4:06
7.	"Wendigo"	3:36
8.	"Glow in the Dark!"	3:27
9.	"Scream"	2:42
10.	"The Damned"	2:49
11.	"Whammy"	3:09
Total length:		37:23

== Charts ==
Chart (2015)	Peak position
US Dance/Electronic Albums (Billboard)>	11
