= Royal Court (web series) =

- Genre: Talk show
- Directed by: Stanley Erhart
- Presented by: Brittany Broski
- Country of origin: United States
- Original language: English
- No. of seasons: 3
- No. of episodes: 76

Original release
- Network: YouTube
- Release: July 20, 2023 – present

Royal Court, or Brittany Broski's Royal Court, is a medieval-themed American YouTube talk show directed by Stanley Erhart and hosted by Brittany Tomlinson, also known as Brittany Broski. Celebrities appearing on the show and discuss pop culture, their careers, and their personal lives. Each episode's guest is considered "pop culture royalty" and withstand an array of challenges to win a spot on Tomlinson's royal council, which each always wins at the end of each episode.

== Structure ==
The show is hosted by Brittany Tomlinson, also known as Brittany Broski. It has a three-act structure in the form of challenges. In the first challenge, the guest arrives for a feast and sometimes dress up as a medieval figure, and Tomlinson asks the guest funny or awkward questions, sometimes citing uniquely personal information about the guest. After the challenge, Tomlinson claps, announces they have passed, and they enter the second challenge, where in recent episodes the guest brings Tomlinson a gift and they discuss it. The third challenge is called the Coat of Arms, where Tomlinson has the guest draw four sections of a coat of arms while she asks more emotional or profound questions. Afterwards, the guest signs the coat of arms and announces they have been inducted into her royal court with a unique title by knighting them. Occasionally, guests promote their upcoming projects at the end of the episode before Tomlinson makes her "guards" drag away the guest.

== Production ==
Tomlinson was inspired to create the show with a desire to combine Game of Thrones and Hot Ones. "I wanted to combine the two with how comfortable Sean Evans makes people feel...with an over the top, whimsical element." She wanted to create a series that lowered celebrities to a level where she "ma[de] them look so ridiculous to where they ha[d] to lean in."

The first episode premiered in July 2023, where Tomlinson interviewed country musician Orville Peck.

In July 2024, after statutory rape allegations against guest Cody Ko came to light, Tomlinson posted a statement about the allegations on her Instagram and subsequently deleted his episode from Royal Court.

In 2026, Brittany appeared on a Royal Court-themed episode of The Drew Barrymore Show to talk about the series, particularly her interview with Harry Styles.

== Episodes ==
=== Season 1 ===
No. overall	No. in season	Title	Original release date
1	1	"Orville Peck Joins Brittany Broski's Royal Court"	July 20, 2023
2	2	"Drew Afualo Joins Brittany Broski's Royal Court"	August 24, 2023
3	3	"Cody Ko Joins Brittany Broski's Royal Court"	September 21, 2023
4	4	"Hasan Piker Joins Brittany Broski's Royal Court"	October 19, 2023
5	5	"Ludwig Joins Brittany Broski's Royal Court"	December 21, 2023
6	6	"Bretman Rock Joins Brittany Broski's Royal Court"	January 27, 2024
7	7	"Rhett & Link Joins Brittany Broski's Royal Court"	February 23, 2024

=== Season 2 ===
No. overall	No. in season	Title	Original release date
8	1	"Cole Sprouse Joins Brittany Broski's Royal Court"	May 30, 2024
9	2	"Charli XCX Joins Brittany Broski's Royal Court"	July 26, 2024
10	3	"Daisy Edgar-Jones Joins Brittany Broski's Royal Court"	August 2, 2024
11	4	"Conan Gray Joins Brittany Broski's Royal Court"	August 30, 2024
12	5	"Ilona Maher Joins Brittany Broski's Royal Court"	October 11, 2024
13	6	"Maren Morris Joins Brittany Broski's Royal Court"	October 25, 2024
14	7	"Owen Thiele Joins Brittany Broski's Royal Court"	November 15, 2024
15	8	"Saoirse Ronan Joins Brittany Broski's Royal Court"	November 22, 2024
16	9	"Aaron Taylor-Johnson Joins Brittany Broski's Royal Court"	December 20, 2024
17	10	"Nicholas Hoult Joins Brittany Broski's Royal Court"	December 30, 2024
18	11	"Ilana Glazer Joins Brittany Broski's Royal Court"	January 16, 2025
19	12	"Sophie Thatcher Joins Brittany Broski's Royal Court"	January 24, 2025
20	13	"Josh Gad Joins Brittany Broski's Royal Court"	January 31, 2025
21	14	"Colman Domingo Joins Brittany Broski's Royal Court"	February 14, 2025
22	15	"Leah Kateb Joins Brittany Broski's Royal Court"	February 28, 2025
23	16	"Michelle Visage Joins Brittany Broski's Royal Court"	March 14, 2025
24	17	"Rob McElhenney Joins Brittany Broski's Royal Court"	March 28, 2025
25	18	"Laufey Joins Brittany Broski's Royal Court"	April 11, 2025
26	19	"Kaitlyn Dever Joins Brittany Broski's Royal Court"	April 18, 2025
27	20	"Caleb Hearon Joins Brittany Broski's Royal Court"	April 25, 2025
28	21	"Geraldine Viswanathan Joins Brittany Broski's Royal Court"	May 9, 2025
29	22	"Diego Luna Joins Brittany Broski's Royal Court"	May 16, 2025
30	23	"Natasha Rothwell Joins Brittany Broski's Royal Court"	May 23, 2025
31	24	"Trixie Mattel Joins Brittany Broski's Royal Court"	June 6, 2025
32	25	"Niecy Nash Joins Brittany Broski's Royal Court"	June 20, 2025
33	26	"David Corenswet Joins Brittany Broski's Royal Court"	July 14, 2025
34	27	"Fortune Feimster Joins Brittany Broski's Royal Court"	July 18, 2025
35	28	"Meg Stalter Joins Brittany Broski's Royal Court"	July 25, 2025
36	29	"Logan Lerman Joins Brittany Broski's Royal Court"	August 1, 2025
37	30	"Hannah Einbinder Joins Brittany Broski's Royal Court"	August 22, 2025
38	31	"Isabela Merced Joins Brittany Broski's Royal Court"	September 5, 2025
39	32	"Tyriq Withers Joins Brittany Broski's Royal Court"	September 19, 2025
40	33	"Lewis Capaldi Joins Brittany Broski's Royal Court"	September 26, 2025
41	34	"Noah Cyrus Joins Brittany Broski's Royal Court"	October 10, 2025
42	35	"Brie Larson Joins Brittany Broski's Royal Court"	October 17, 2025
43	36	"Kyle MacLachlan Joins Brittany Broski's Royal Court"	October 24, 2025
44	37	"Fred Armisen Joins Brittany Broski's Royal Court"	October 30, 2025

=== Season 3 ===
No. overall	No. in season	Title	Original release date
45	1	"Finn Wolfhard Joins Brittany Broski's Royal Court"	November 7, 2025
46	2	"Josh Hutcherson Joins Brittany Broski's Royal Court"	November 14, 2025
47	3	"Paul Mescal Joins Brittany Broski's Royal Court"	November 21, 2025
48	4	"Da'Vine Joy Randolph Joins Brittany Broski's Royal Court"	December 3, 2025
49	5	"Jessie Buckley Joins Brittany Broski's Royal Court"	December 12, 2025
50	6	"Rachel Sennott Joins Brittany Broski's Royal Court"	December 19, 2025
51	7	"Myha'la Joins Brittany Broski's Royal Court"	January 9, 2026
52	8	"Marcello Hernández Joins Brittany Broski's Royal Court"	January 16, 2026
53	9	"Dylan O'Brien Joins Brittany Broski's Royal Court"	January 23, 2026
54	10	"The Bridgerton Cast Joins Brittany Broski's Royal Court" (Yerin Ha and Luke Thompson)	February 2, 2026
55	11	"Marcus Mumford Joins Brittany Broski's Royal Court"	February 18, 2026
56	12	"Harry Styles Joins Brittany Broski's Royal Court"	February 25, 2026
57	13	"Bob The Drag Queen Joins Brittany Broski's Royal Court"	March 13, 2026
58	14	"Dove Cameron Joins Brittany Broski's Royal Court"	March 20, 2026
59	15	"Elijah Wood Joins Brittany Broski's Royal Court"	March 27, 2026
60	16	"The Pitt Cast Joins Brittany Broski's Royal Court" (Isa Briones and Patrick Ball)	April 3, 2026
61	17	"Tony Hawk Joins Brittany Broski's Royal Court"	April 10, 2026
62	18	"Bob Odenkirk Joins Brittany Broski's Royal Court"	April 17, 2026
63	19	"Chase Infiniti Joins Brittany Broski's Royal Court"	April 24, 2026
64	20	"Storm Reid Joins Brittany Broski's Royal Court"	May 1, 2026
65	21	"Jinkx Monsoon Joins Brittany Broski's Royal Court"	May 8, 2026
66	22	"Keke Palmer Joins Brittany Broski's Royal Court"	May 15, 2026
67	23	"Sam Fender Joins Brittany Broski's Royal Court"	May 22, 2026
68	24	"Brooke & Conner Joins Brittany Broski's Royal Court"	June 5, 2026
69	25	"Sombr Joins Brittany Broski's Royal Court"	June 17, 2026
70	26	"Milly Alcock Joins Brittany Broski's Royal Court"	June 26, 2026
71	27	"Matt Smith Joins Brittany Broski's Royal Court"	July 1, 2026
72	28	"Mindy Kaling Joins Brittany Broski's Royal Court"	July 10, 2026
73	29	"Matt Damon & Anne Hathaway Joins Brittany Broski's Royal Court"	July 17, 2026
74	30	"Kit Connor & Joe Locke Joins Brittany Broski's Royal Court"	July 24, 2026
75	31	"Sasha Colby Joins Brittany Broski's Royal Court"	July 31, 2026
76	32	"The HOTD Cast Joins Brittany Broski's Royal Court" (Tom Glynn-Carney and Steve Toussaint)	August 7, 2026
77	33	"Kristen Stewart & Alia Shawkat Join Brittany Broski's Royal Court"	August 14, 2026
78	34	"Madelyn Cline Joins Brittany Broski's Royal Court"	August 21, 2026
79	35	"Adam Scott Joins Brittany Broski's Royal Court"	August 28, 2026
80	36	"Nicole Kidman & Sandra Bullock Joins Brittany Broski's Royal Court"	September 9, 2026
81	37	"Maitreyi Ramakrishnan Joins Brittany Broski's Royal Court"	September 18, 2026
82	38	"Lili Reinhart Joins Brittany Broski's Royal Court"	September 25, 2026
83	39	"Riz Ahmed Joins Brittany Broski's Royal Court"	October 2, 2026
84	40	"Drew Barrymore Joins Brittany Broski's Royal Court"	October 9, 2026
85	41	"The Basement Yard Joins Brittany Broski's Royal Court"	October 16, 2026
