= My Heart Belongs to Daddy =

1938 Cole Porter song

"My Heart Belongs to Daddy" is a song written by Cole Porter for the musical Leave It to Me! which premiered on November 9, 1938. It was originally performed by Mary Martin, who played Dolly Winslow, the young "protégée" of a rich newspaper publisher, her sugar daddy. In the musical, Dolly wears a fur coat while stranded at a Siberian railway station and surrounded by eager men. She performs a striptease and sings to them about how since she has her "daddy", she may still flirt with other men but won't "follow through".

== Later versions ==
Martin sang it again in the 1940 movie Love Thy Neighbor. Again she wears a fur coat, but the setting is a show within a show and the act is more conventional as she wears an evening gown beneath the fur. The words to the introduction are altered, the innuendoes being toned down. Her best-known movie performance is in the 1946 Cole Porter biopic Night and Day in which she plays herself. The film recreates Martin's audition then segues into her performance in the original Siberian context. She again performs the striptease, discarding her muff and then the fur coat, while mustachioed Siberian men follow her every move, eventually fainting when she removes her coat to reveal a skimpy figure-hugging costume beneath.

In Britain, the song was a hit for Pat Kirkwood, who performed it in the 1938 revue Black Velvet. This led to her being dubbed "Britain's first wartime star". The song was thereafter associated with her.

Marilyn Monroe sings the song in the film Let's Make Love (1960). The introduction is completely changed. She introduces herself as "Lolita", who is not supposed to "play with boys". A verse is added in which she invites a boy "to cook up a fine enchilada". The lines do not conform to the rhyme scheme of the rest of the song, but have been used by many other performers since. Anna Nicole Smith recorded a copy of the Monroe version in 1997; it was released in CD-single and 12 maxi with two versions.

== Lyrical and musical features ==
The original has an introductory verse starting in a major key with "I used to fall in love with all" and ending by transitioning into minor while saying that she has since "come to care, for such a sweet millionaire" (i.e. her sugar daddy).

The chorus incorporates flirtatious sexual innuendo in its idiosyncratic rhymes with "daddy". While "daddy" is a difficult word to rhyme, Porter characteristically managed it well. The first rhyme is about a game of ‘stroke play’ golf during which she "might make a play for the caddy". The second rhyme suggestively refers to eating "Finnan haddie" (smoked fish):

If I invite
A boy some night
To dine on my fine Finnan haddie,
I just adore
His asking for more,
But my heart belongs to daddy.

The chorus is repeated with additional lyrics starting with a rhyme about "wearing green with a paddie" on Saint Patrick's Day and a final rhyme is about longing for a "strong undergraddy" at a football match. In the original version, she ends up saying that her daddy might "spank" her if she was "bad".

Sophie Tucker famously advised Mary Martin to deliver such sexy lines while looking towards heaven. Mary Martin's stage persona was quite innocent and so the contrast between her naive manner and the suggestive lyrics accompanied by her delivery (in one recording she inserts a significant pause in the middle of the word 'asking' in the above-quoted lyric) and the provocative striptease made her performance a huge success. Brooks Atkinson, the critic of the New York Times, wrote that Martin's "mock innocence makes My Heart Belongs to Daddy the bawdy ballad of the season".

Referring to the melody, especially the passage of "da da da da"s, Oscar Levant described it as "one of the most Yiddish tunes ever written" despite the fact that "Cole Porter's background was not Jewish." Lyrics critic Philip Furia replied that the essence of that bit of melody is to suggest that "Daddy" is Jewish.

== Notable recordings ==
- The 1938 version by bandleader Larry Clinton with singer Bea Wain was the most successful of the many contemporary recordings, entering the U.S. charts at the same time as Mary Martin's original cast recording but peaking at No. 4, compared to Martin's No. 7.
- Ella Fitzgerald, along with Chick Webb and His Orchestra – My Heart Belongs to Daddy (1939), Songs in a Mellow Mood(1954), and Ella Loves Cole (1972).
- The Count Basie Orchestra (1939) with Helen Humes on Decca
- Valaida Snow – (1940)
- Artie Shaw with vocals by Kitty Kallen - Artie Shaw Plays Cole Porter (1946)
- Peggy Lee – Black Coffee (1953)
- Eartha Kitt – That Bad Eartha (1956)
- Pat Suzuki on her album Pat Suzuki (1958).
- Anita O'Day – Cool Heat (1959).
- Dizzy Gillespie – Have Trumpet, Will Excite! (1959)
- Della Reese – Della Della Cha Cha Cha (1960)
- Julie London – All Through the Night: Julie London Sings the Choicest of Cole Porter (1965)
- Herb Alpert and the Tijuana Brass – Herb Alpert's Ninth (1967)
- Violetta Villas – Violetta Villas sings (1970)
- Rosemary Clooney - Rosemary Clooney Sings the Music of Cole Porter (1982)
- Sinéad O'Connor – (recorded a cover of the song that appears as a b-side to her 1992 rendition of "Success")
- Oscar Peterson – Night Train CD reissue (1997) recorded in 1963
- Anna Nicole Smith – My Heart Belongs To Daddy (1997)
- Dee Dee Bridgewater – Dear Ella (1997)
- Paul Motian – On Broadway Vol.1 (2003)
- Sophie Milman – Sophie Milman (2004)
- Stacey Kent and Jim Tomlinson – The Lyric (2005)
- Barbara Lusch, a Portland, Oregon-based jazz singer performed the song on her 2006 release Surprisingly Good for You.
- Jinkx Monsoon – The Inevitable Album (2014)

== Other pop culture appearances ==
- Dorothy Dandridge – CBS's “Ford Star Jubilee's tribute to Cole Porter" (1956)
- Marilyn Monroe – Let's Make Love (1960). During her performance she wears a purple sweater over a black bodystocking. Near the end of the song, she takes off her sweater, revealing her bodystocking and a black bikini over it.
- Ariana Grande recorded a cover of the song to be used in an interlude for her Sweetener World Tour. Her rendition was also included on her live album K Bye for Now (SWT Live)
- The 1939 Eddy Duchin recording with Mary Martin was featured in the soundtrack of the 2010 first person shooter video game Bioshock 2.
