= The Ginger Snapped =

Studio album by Jinkx Monsoon
- Released: January 12, 2018
- Length: 47:42
- Label: Producer Entertainment Group
- Producer: Yair Evnine

Jinkx Monsoon chronology
ReAnimated (2015)	The Ginger Snapped (2018)	The Virgo Odyssey: Prologue (2022)

Singles from The Ginger Snapped
- 1. "Cartoons and Vodka" Released: January 12, 2018

The Ginger Snapped is the second studio album by American drag performer Jinkx Monsoon, released on January 12, 2018. The album was produced by Yair Evnine and features guest appearances by Amanda Palmer, Lady Rizo, and Fred Schneider. It was inspired by alternative music of the 1990s and 2000s.

== Background ==
A follow-up to 2014's The Inevitable Album, The Ginger Snapped was described as "a departure from our well known cabaret style, diving into our favorite rock influences. We drew inspiration from our favorite rock and ska artists of the 90's". The album was fully funded through Kickstarter. In the Kickstarter pitch, Monsoon described the album as having a "90's garage band throwback sound".

== Track listing ==
Track listing adapted from Billboard and AllMusic. All tracks composed by Jinkx Monsoon and Major Scales; except where indicated.

No.	Title	Writer(s)	Length
1.	"What's On"		3:32
2.	"She Evil" (featuring Fred Schneider)		3:35
3.	"Cartoons and Vodka"		3:38
4.	"Boys in the Band" (featuring Amanda Palmer)		4:25
5.	"I Just Wanna Make Love to You"	Willie Dixon	3:03
6.	"Just Me (The Gender Binary Blues)"		4:37
7.	"Friends"		3:38
8.	"Sugar Mama"		3:59
9.	"This Town"		4:15
10.	"Pianoman" (featuring Lady Rizo)	Major Scales, Fred Schneider	3:59
11.	"Take It Back"		5:20
12.	"You've Really Got a Hold on Me"	Smokey Robinson	4:41
