= Sketchy Queens =

Television series

- Genre: Sketch comedy
- Created by: Jinkx Monsoon; Liam Krug
- Starring: Jinkx Monsoon; Liam Krug
- Country of origin: United States
- Original language: English
- No. of seasons: 2
- No. of episodes: 14

Production
- Production location: Portland, Oregon
- Editor: Paul Detrick
- Running time: 12–17 minutes
- Production company: World of Wonder

Original release
- Network: WOW Presents Plus
- Release: September 15, 2022 – present

Sketchy Queens is an American sketch comedy television series premiered on WOW Presents Plus on September 15, 2022. It marks the streaming service's first original sketch-comedy programming. The series stars Jinkx Monsoon and Liam Krug in various sketches. The series also included guest appearances, such as Trixie Mattel, Brandon Rogers, and Brittany Broski.

In November 2022, the production company World of Wonder announced that the show has been renewed for a second season, which premiered on January 27, 2025.

== Background ==
The series was announced by World of Wonder's streaming platform, WOW Presents Plus, its fall lineup filled with many original programming series to debut. A trailer for WOW Presents Plus' fall lineup revealed the comedy show was set to be released on September 15, 2022. In November 2022, the comedy show was renewed for a second season.

== Format ==
=== Sunrise Boulevard ===
Liam Krug bumps into Jinkx Monsoon on Sunrise Boulevard (Portland, Oregon), where they are trying to revitalize Monsoon's career into the modern world.

=== Sonoma Public Access ===
Winderly Landchime and Bethany Christmas bought a bankrupted public-access television station.

I See You and I Hear You: Winderly Landchime and Bethany Christmas interview many special guests.

== Episodes ==
Season	Episodes	Originally released	
Season	Episodes	First released	Last released
1	8	September 15, 2022	October 27, 2022
2	6	January 27, 2025	March 3, 2025

=== Season 1 (2022) ===
No. overall	No. in season	Title	Original release date	Guest(s)
1	1	"Symphony of Jennifers"	September 15, 2022	Trixie Mattel
Liam Krug meets Jinkx Monsoon in Portland, Oregon.
2	2	"Off Brand Super Villains"	September 22, 2022	Wolf Hudson
Jinkx Monsoon and Liam Krug visit Portland.
3	3	"Stage Moms Are People Too"	September 29, 2022	Katya Zamolodchikova
Jinkx Monsoon and Liam Krug are auditioning.
4	4	"Not Your Mama's Period Drama"	October 6, 2022	Brandon Rogers
Jinkx Monsoon and Liam Krug are reviving their career.
5	5	"The Garden of Edie"	October 13, 2022	Raja Gemini
Jinkx Monsoon and Liam Krug are visiting an old friend.
6	6	"It's Burger Time."	October 20, 2022	Brittany Broski
Jinkx Monsoon and Liam Krug are creating content.
7	7	"So Much Fun It's Scary"	October 27, 2022	–
Someone hosted a yard sale.
8	8	"Extremely Good Finale"	October 27, 2022	Kandy Muse
Jinkx Monsoon and Liam Krug ended the season.

=== Season 2 (2025) ===
No. overall	No. in season	Title	Original release date	Guest(s)
9	1	"Burn the Witch"	January 27, 2025	TBA
10	2	"Jennifers Run The World"	February 3, 2025	TBA
11	3	"I Larva You"	February 10, 2025	TBA
12	4	"Mother Knows Best"	February 17, 2025	TBA
13	5	"Wigging Out"	February 24, 2025	TBA
14	6	"I Really See You and I Truly Hear You"	March 3, 2025	TBA
