= Escape Nightclub =

Defunct nightclub in Portland, Oregon, U.S.

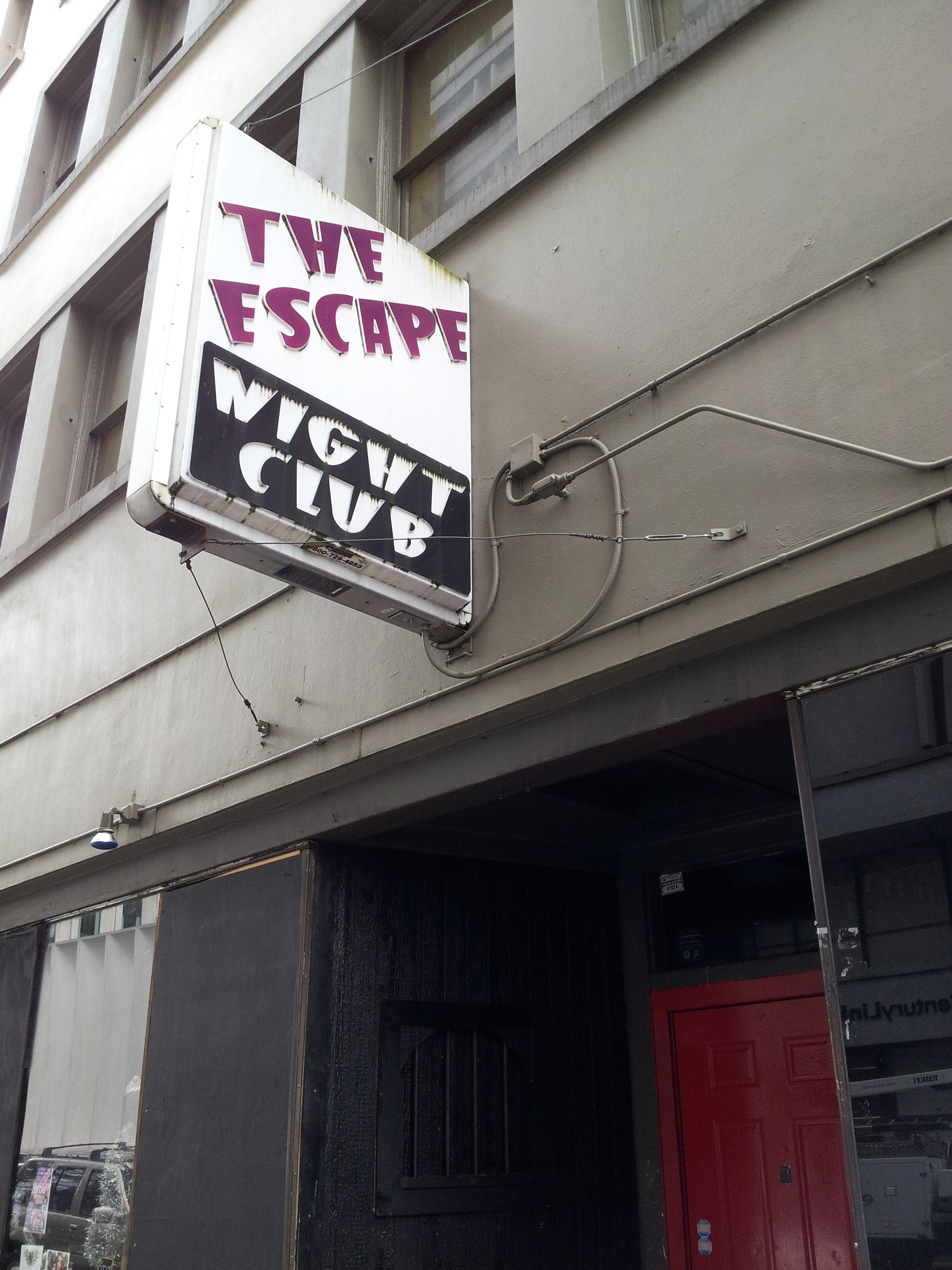
- Signage above the nightclub's entrance, 2014

- Location within Portland, Oregon
- Location: Portland, Oregon, U.S.
- Coordinates: 45.52198°N 122.67962°W
- Type: Nightclub

Construction
- Closed: 2016

The Escape Nightclub, also known as Escape Club or The Escape, was an all-ages LGBT-friendly nightclub in Portland, Oregon, in the United States.

== History ==
In 2016, it was announced in the Portland Tribune that the space formerly occupied was going to serve as a homeless shelter to temporarily house transients with expected opening by Thanksgiving day in 2016.

On February 1, 2017, Willamette Week reported that Escape had closed four months prior to the news story publication after operating for fourteen years.

Drag performer Jinkx Monsoon has said, "The very first time I performed in drag on a large scale was at the Escape."

== See also ==
- Culture of Portland, Oregon
