= Brittany Broski =

American comedic social media personality (born 1997)

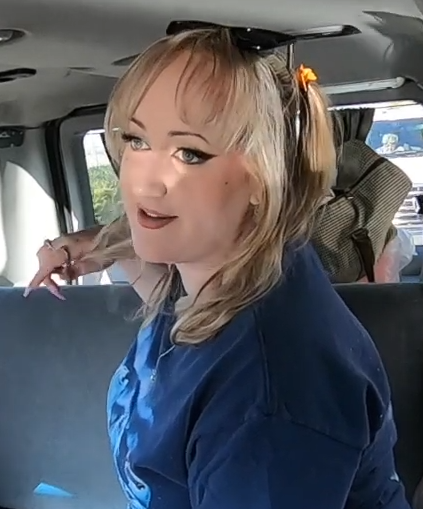
- Broski in 2021
- Born: Brittany Alexis Tomlinson; May 10, 1997 (age 29); Valdosta, Georgia, U.S.
- Other name: Kombucha Girl
- Education: Texas A&M University
- Occupations: YouTuber; influencer; podcaster; comedian

TikTok information
- Pages: Brittany; secret brittany; The Broski Report
- Years active: 2019–present
- Followers: 7.5 million (main); 5.9 million (second); 1.3 million (third)

YouTube information
- Channels: Brittany Broski; Broski Report; Royal Court
- Years active: 2019–present
- Subscribers: 2.6 million (main channel); 1.1 million (second); 1.3 million (third)
- Views: 276 million (main channel); 173 million (second); 242 million (third)
- Last updated: October 7, 2026

Brittany Alexis Tomlinson (born May 10, 1997), known professionally as Brittany Broski, is an American influencer, podcaster, YouTuber, singer and comedian. She initially gained fame after a video of her tasting kombucha for the first time went viral on TikTok in 2019. She signed to United Talent Agency later that year and has since hosted the TikTok-produced podcast For You (2021), the pop culture-focused podcasts Violating Community Guidelines (2022–2023) with Sarah Schauer and The Broski Report (2023–present), and the YouTube talk show Royal Court (2023–present).

== Early life ==
Tomlinson participated in theater growing up, acting in local productions of The Addams Family, Bus Stop, and Spamalot. During both high school and college, she was a part of her schools' improv troupes. According to Tomlinson, she often spent time on Tumblr as a teenager, where she was a part of the fan communities for bands such as The 1975 and One Direction.

In 2018, Tomlinson graduated from Texas A&M University magna cum laude with a degree in communications and a minor in Spanish. She subsequently worked at a call center. She then worked in trust and investment services at a bank, where she was fired after her boss discovered the kombucha video and determined that Tomlinson's viral fame would put the company at risk. She is also a licensed insurance agent.

== Career ==
Tomlinson created her TikTok account in June 2019 at the request of her friends, originally using the handle @brittanyt445. She posted her first video, a Snapchat video about her "depression meal", which went viral a month later.

She subsequently posted her most viral video, wherein she tastes cream soda-flavored kombucha for the first time with rapidly changing facial expressions, in August 2019. The video first gained notoriety on "gay Twitter" after being reposted with sexually charged captions, eventually gaining traction on Reddit and Twitter, gaining more than 40 million views on the latter platform by the end of the month. The video also became a popular reaction image on social media and was ranked by TikTok as one of the top ten most viral videos of 2019 posted to the platform. Its popularity earned her the nickname "Kombucha Girl". She also became popular on the app for her relatable comedic videos.

Following the success of the kombucha video, Tomlinson was signed to Influences Management and later to United Talent Agency. In December 2019, Tomlinson moved to Los Angeles with fellow TikToker Sarah Schauer and the two began making YouTube videos together. She appeared in an advertisement for Sabra hummus during Super Bowl LIV. In early 2020, she competed on the second season of the YouTube reality show The Reality House, hosted by JC Caylen and Kian Lawley; she was eliminated in the first episode. In August 2020, she was featured in an episode of the Awesomeness web television series Dish This. She was nominated for a Subject Award in Comedy at the 10th Streamy Awards. She co-hosted the TikTok New Year's Eve Party live event with American rapper Lil Yachty in December 2020. After she used the song "Remy the Ratatouille" in a video, the song went viral, inspiring the creation of Ratatouille the Musical. In early 2021, Tomlinson became the host of TikTok's official podcast, For You, wherein she interviewed other popular TikTokers.

Tomlinson's collaborative, Studio71-produced podcast with Schauer about Internet oddities, Violating Community Guidelines, premiered in January 2022. The two self-financed the podcast and it garnered a cult following before ending in early 2023. In 2022, Tomlinson appeared on the Discovery+ series Trixie Motel, hosted by her frequent collaborator Trixie Mattel. She launched her podcast, The Broski Report, in May 2023. Its debut episode became the fourth most-streamed podcast episode in the U.S. on Spotify upon release, while its YouTube channel had more than 500 thousand subscribers by November 2023. Her monthly, medieval-themed YouTube talk show, Royal Court, premiered in July 2023. Royal Court has featured a wide variety of celebrity guests including Anne Hathaway, Charli XCX, Sandra Bullock and Elijah Wood. Tomlinson has stated that Royal Court was inspired by Sean Evans's interview series Hot Ones. Both The Broski Report and Royal Court are heavily focused on pop culture and fan culture. At the 13th Streamy Awards in August 2023, she was awarded a Creator Honor by Amelia Dimoldenberg.

As of 2024, she had more than seven and a half million followers on her main TikTok account, over five and a half million followers on her "Secret Brittany" TikTok account, and over two million subscribers on her YouTube account. In March 2025, Tomlinson released her first official piece of music, a cover of Harry Styles' 'Adore You'. In April, she released her debut single, 'The Sun', described as a "pop rock song dripping with bluegrass guitar and nods to her influences, which include Mumford and Sons, Florence & the Machine, and Hozier" according to CT Jones from Rolling Stone. In 2025, Tomlinson was named one of the TIME100 Creators of 2025.

In March 2026, Tomlinson co-hosted the Vanity Fair Oscar party livestream alongside social media creators including Quenlin Blackwell and Jake Shane.

== Public image ==
Tomlinson in 2022

Tomlinson's fanbase is known as "Broski Nation". In 2020, Josh Kaplan of The Telegraph called Tomlinson "one of TikTok's biggest stars". Writing for i-D, Tom Prior referred to her as a "TikTok superstar" and named a video of her rapping in the voice of English singer Adele as one of the 20 best TikToks of 2020. L'Officiel included her on their list of "People Who Made Us Laugh in 2020". Tomlinson was described in 2022 as the "patron saint of memes" in HuffPost, while BuzzFeed referred to her as a "TikTok star". In 2022, Interview referred to Tomlinson as a "meme queen-turned-internet icon". Today's Kristian Burt wrote in 2023 that Tomlinson had "conquer[ed] the land of TikTok in a matter of years" and that she had created a "Gen-Z media empire". Ellie Rudy of Los Angeles magazine called her "a prominent ally to the queer and drag community" and a "bit of a drag icon" for her association with drag queen Trixie Mattel.

In 2020, Tomlinson faced backlash after referring to phrases attributed to African-American Vernacular English as "internet culture". In November 2023, a video from her "Close Friends" story on Instagram leaked of her expressing frustration toward being expected to discuss the Israeli–Palestinian conflict during the Gaza war on The Broski Report. She soon posted a four-minute-long video on TikTok, apologizing for her silence on the war and stating: "Free Palestine."

Tomlinson collaborates with Caleb Hearon and Drew Afualo.

== Discography ==
=== Singles ===
==== As lead artist ====
List of singles as lead artist showing year released and album name
Title	Year	Album
"Adore You" (cover)	2025	Non–album singles
"The Sun"	2025	Non–album singles
"Stained"	2025	Non–album singles

== Filmography ==
=== Television ===
Year	Title	Notes	Ref.
2022	Is It Cake?	Guest judge; 1 episode	
2022–2024	Trixie Motel	2 episodes	
2025	Cartoonified with Phineas and Ferb	Guest voice; Episode: "Brittany Broski"	

=== Web series ===
Year	Title	Notes	Ref.
2021	What's My Game?	Episode: "Alaska vs. Brittany Broski"	
2022	Binge Queens	RuPaul's Drag Race: UK vs the World; 6 episodes	
2022	Tartan Around with Lawrence Chaney	1 episode	
2022	Sketchy Queens	1 episode	
2023–present	Royal Court	Host, creator, writer and producer	
2024	The Pit Stop	Guest	
2024	The Yard	Guest	
2024	Fear&	Guest	
2026	Jeopardy! YouTube Edition	Video Clue Presenter	

== Awards and nominations ==
Award	Year	Recipient(s) and nominee(s)	Category	Result	Ref.
Break the Internet Awards	2019	Herself	TikToker of the Year	Won	
WOWIE Awards	2019	Herself	Best Viral Moment	Nominated	
Shorty Awards	2020	Herself	TikToker of the Year	Nominated	
Streamy Awards	2020	Herself	Subject Award - Comedy	Nominated	
Streamy Awards	2023	Herself	Creator Honor	Won	
WOWIE Awards	2020	Herself	Outstanding TikTok - Comedy	Won	
Signal Awards	2023	Violating Community Guidelines	Best "Buddy" Podcast	Silver	
Signal Awards	2023	Violating Community Guidelines	Popular Culture & Variety	Gold	
Webby Awards	2025	Royal Court	Video & Film - Interview, Talk & After-Show	Pending	
