= The Inevitable Album =

Studio album by Jinkx Monsoon
- Released: May 6, 2014
- Length: 52:59
- Label: Sidecar Records

Jinkx Monsoon chronology
| The Inevitable Album (2014) | The Ginger Snapped (2018) |

Singles from The Inevitable Album
- 1. "Coffee & Wine" Released: April 22, 2014; 2. "The Bacon Shake" Released: September 16, 2014; 3. "Creep" Released: November 11, 2014

The Inevitable Album is a debut studio album by American drag performer Jinkx Monsoon, released by Sidecar Records on May 6, 2014.

== Composition ==
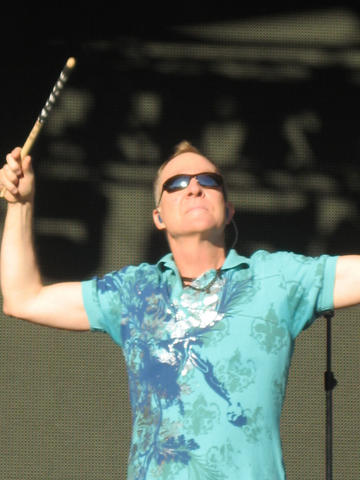
Fred Schneider (pictured in 2007) is featured on two of the album's tracks.

The album has original tracks written for Jinkx Monsoon by her music collaborator Richard Andriessen. Fred Schneider is featured on two of the tracks. According to David Clarke of Broadway World, the tracks "come across as both a homogeneous and eclectic blend of music". The album was inspired by Bette Midler's debut studio album The Divine Miss M (1972) and torch songs by Marlene Dietrich and Peggy Lee, as well as Lady Rizo, Amanda Palmer, and Regina Spektor for the album.

"Ladies in Drag" was described by Clarke as a "gutsy and perfectly phrased re-tooling" of "The Ladies Who Lunch", a song from the Broadway musical Company written by Stephen Sondheim and introduced by Elaine Stritch. "What About Debbie" interpolates Joan Cusack's monologue from the movie Addams Family Values.

== Reception ==
Broadway World's David Clarke described the "cleverly titled" album as "irresistible and altogether decadent", "dazzling and dizzying", and "a triumphant celebration of Jinkx Monsoon's gratifying personality and the delectable cabaret-inspired flavors that make this sensational performer tick". He named "Ladies in Drag", "My Heart Belongs to Daddy", "The Bacon Shake", "What About Debbie", and "A Song to Come Home To" as highlights, but acknowledged, "All of the songs standalone individually and as a cohesive whole, making it hard to single out favorites on the album." Furthermore, he wrote:

The heavily bluesy and jazzy aesthetic of the traditional torch song can be found on almost every track of the album, tying it all together well. Yet, the numbers that break that mold are snappy, pick-me-up performances that leave the listener in awe of Jinkx Monsoon's ability to share her spirit so easily across the medium of recorded music. There is a certain joie de vivre and ambience captured on the recording that truly makes the listening experience feel as if she is signing live for you and directly to you.

== Track listing ==
The Inevitable Album
| No. | Title | Writer(s) | Length |
|---|---|---|---|
| 1. | "Ladies in Drag" (foreword by Fred Schneider) | Jinkx Monsoon; Stephen Sondheim | 4:42 |
| 2. | "No One as Sorry as Me" | Major Scales | 2:11 |
| 3. | "Coffee & Wine" | Scales | 3:01 |
| 4. | "My Heart Belongs to Daddy" | Cole Porter | 3:47 |
| 5. | "The Bacon Shake" | Scalese; Schneider; Diego Sánchez | 3:06 |
| 6. | "Everybody's Girl" | Fred Ebb; John Kander | 3:37 |
| 7. | "Hold On" | Scales | 2:40 |
| 8. | "Hi-Jinkx Samba" | Sánchez | 1:44 |
| 9. | "Witchcraft" (featuring Major Scales) | Cy Coleman; Carolyn Leigh | 4:00 |
| 10. | "What About Debbie" | Paul Rudnick; Scales | 3:53 |
| 11. | "Ballad of Johnny and Jack" | Scales | 3:46 |
| 12. | "One Tiny Taste" | John Woods | 2:43 |
| 13. | "Creep" | Colin Greenwood; Jonny Greenwood; Edward O'Brien; Philip Selway; Thom Yorke; Albert Hammond; Mike Hazlewood | 3:19 |
| 14. | "A Song to Come Home To" | Scales | 6:28 |
| 15. | "Falling in Love Again" | Reginald Connelly; Friedrich Hollaender; Sammy Lerner | 4:00 |
| Total length: | | | 52:59 |
