= Jinkx Monsoon =

American drag queen (born 1987)

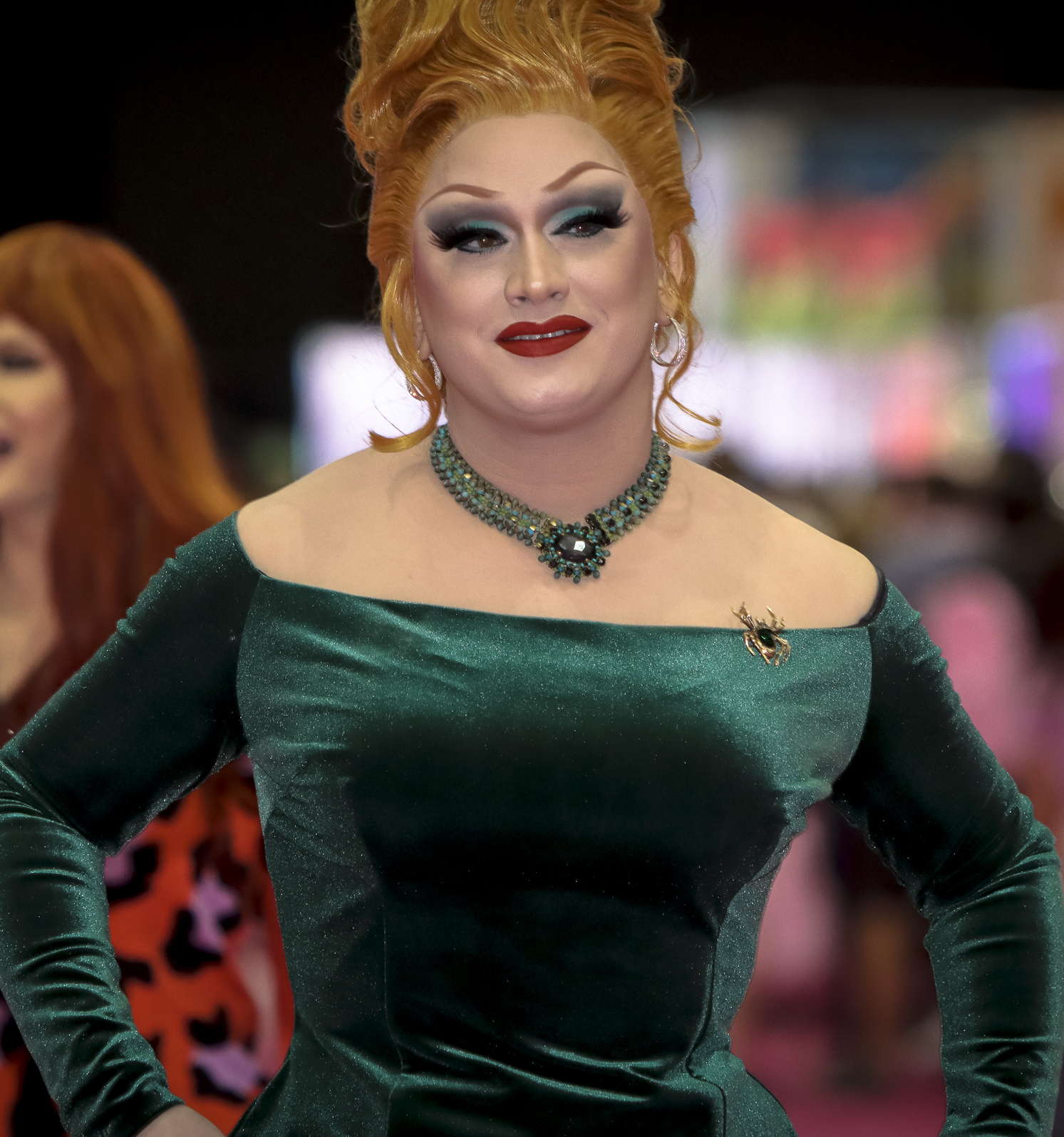
- Monsoon in 2022
- Born: September 18, 1987 (age 39); Portland, Oregon, U.S.
- Education: Cornish College of the Arts (BFA)
- Occupations: Drag queen; actress; singer; reality television personality
- Years active: 2003–present
- Television: Doctor Who – "The Devil's Chord"; RuPaul's Drag Race (season 5); RuPaul's Drag Race All Stars (season 7)
- Spouse: Michael Abbott (m. 2021; sep. 2023)
- Musical career
- Origin: Seattle, Washington, U.S.
- Genres: Jazz; pop; rock; alternative
- Instruments: vocals; ukulele
- Labels: Sidecar Records; Producer Entertainment Group
- Website: jinkxmonsoon.com

Hera Lilith Hoffer (born September 18, 1987), best known by the stage name Jinkx Monsoon, is an American drag queen, actress, singer and comedian, best known for winning the fifth season (2013) of RuPaul's Drag Race, as well as the All-Winners seventh season of All-Stars, becoming the first and only queen to win two crowns on the show. She made her Broadway debut in 2023 and has appeared in character roles on television and in cabaret.

Throughout her drag career, she has been noted for her wit and comedic timing, her musical theatre-inspired performances, and for celebrity impersonations, including Judy Garland, Edie "Little Edie" Bouvier Beale, and Natasha Lyonne.

She has also pursued a career in music, releasing two studio albums: The Inevitable Album (2014) and The Ginger Snapped (2018). In film, Monsoon appeared with her collaborative and touring partner BenDeLaCreme in the holiday film The Jinkx and DeLa Holiday Special (2021) which was later released on Hulu. On television, Monsoon she has appeared in the WOW Presents Plus original Sketchy Queens, a series she created alongside Liam Krug, and the BBC series Doctor Who as the villain Maestro. In 2023 she made her Broadway debut in Chicago as "Mama" Morton, continued in musical theatre as Audrey in Little Shop of Horrors in New York and, in 2025, made a Carnegie Hall debut and returned to Broadway in Pirates! The Penzance Musical. In 2026 she made her West End debut in the lead role of Oh, Mary!.

== Early life ==
Hoffer was born in an Irish Catholic household on September 18, 1987, in Portland, Oregon and raised in an unstable environment. Her father was 17 when Hoffer was born, grew up in a group home and he was absent during her childhood. Her mother Deanne Hoffer, was a heavy alcoholic, leaving Hoffer at age 12 to take on a parental role for her younger siblings. She described her mother as "a woman who wasn't ready to be a mom." Her mother is intersex and has an underdeveloped testicle. She has two younger brothers and a half-sister.

Hoffer attended da Vinci Arts Middle School and Grant High School. She worked as a janitor through college and graduated with a Bachelor of Fine Arts degree in theater from Cornish College of the Arts in 2010.

Hoffer learned she was of partial Ashkenazi ancestry as a teenager; after her maternal grandmother, Judith Irwin-Hoffer, died in 2008 from complications of a stroke, she learned Judith was born to Jewish parents of Polish and Finnish descent and had been adopted by an Irish Catholic couple. Hoffer initially told The Times of Israel she was of Russian Jewish ancestry. Hoffer has said that she uses Jinkx Monsoon as a way to connect to her Jewish heritage, describing the character as a "...failed actress [...] every gay boy's favorite cabaret act."

== Career ==
=== Early career ===
Hoffer began performing in drag at age 15, two years after coming out as gay. Performing at Portland's all-ages Escape Nightclub under the name Heidi Destruction, Hoffer found an outlet for her creativity through drag. She later adopted the stage surname Monsoon after Edina Monsoon, the central character in the British sitcom Absolutely Fabulous.

After relocating to Seattle, Hoffer became active in the city's theatre and drag communities. In 2011, she and writer-performer Nick Sahoyah created and starred in the Funny or Die web series Monsoon Season, in which Hoffer portrayed Jinkx Monsoon as an overbearing, substance-addled and nearly psychotic mother opposite Sahoyah's character, Kamikaze Monsoon. Later that year, Hoffer appeared in the Wes Hurley film Waxie Moon in Fallen Jewel and became the subject of Drag Becomes Him, a documentary web series directed by Alex Berry that explored her life in and out of drag.

The following year, Hoffer expanded into musical theatre. In January 2012, she portrayed Moritz in a Seattle production of Spring Awakening. The performance drew attention after a review in The Seattle Times described Hoffer as "overly flamboyant" for the role, prompting columnist Dan Savage to publicly defend the casting and challenge assumptions about queer actors portraying heterosexual characters. Later that year, she appeared as Angel in Seattle's 5th Avenue Theatre production of Rent.

By late 2012, Hoffer had appeared in a web series, a documentary series, an independent film and several theatre productions before being cast on the fifth season of RuPaul's Drag Race, marking the beginning of her national television career.

=== RuPaul's Drag Race ===
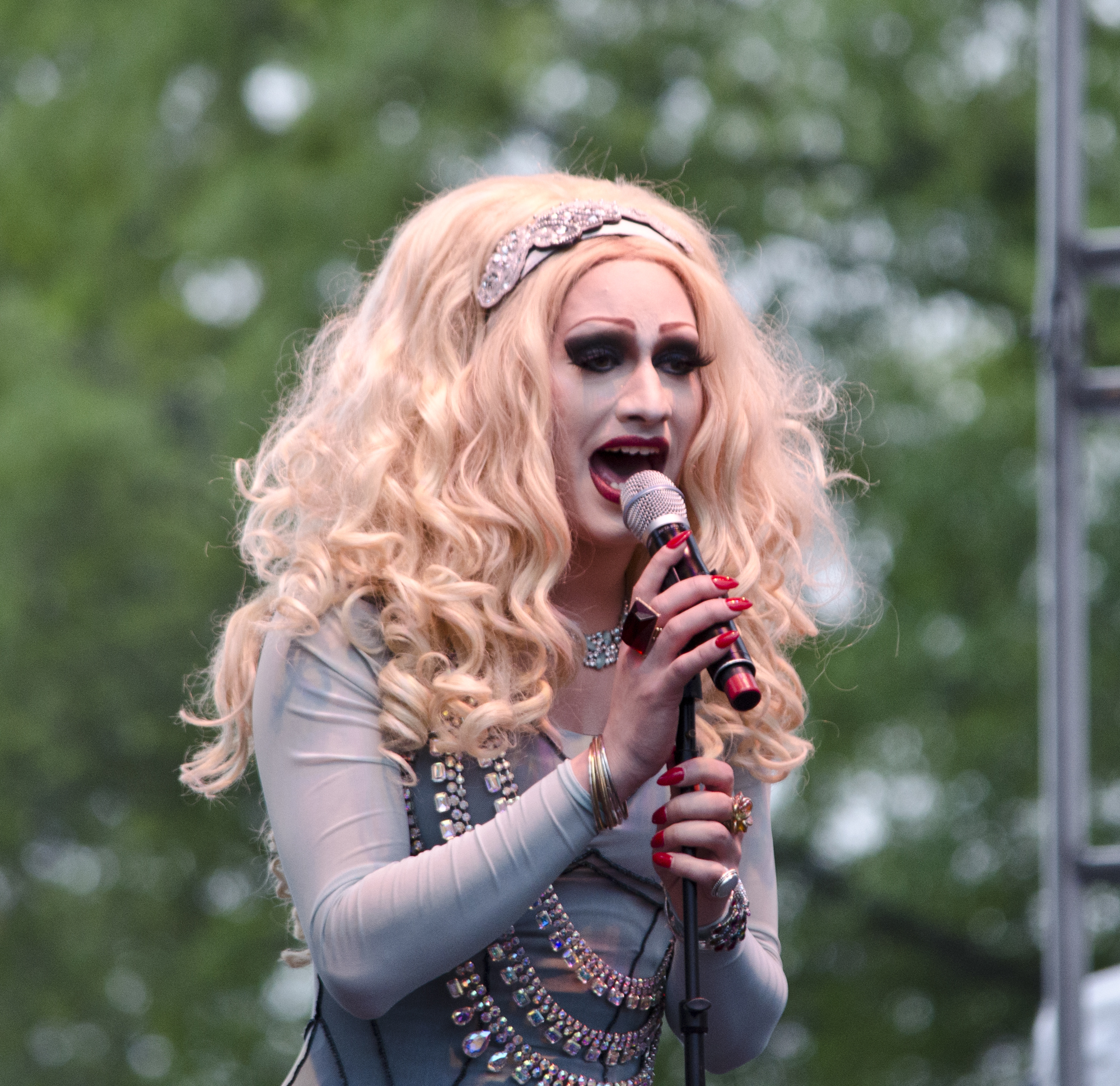
Jinkx Monsoon at Pride 2013

In November 2012, Logo announced that Jinkx Monsoon was among the 14 contestants selected for the fifth season of RuPaul's Drag Race. Hoffer later said she decided to audition after watching drag performer Sharon Needles compete on the show's fourth season.

During the season, Monsoon won the main challenges for "Drama Queens" and the annual "Snatch Game", a challenge in which contestants impersonate celebrities. For Snatch Game, she portrayed socialite Edie "Little Edie" Bouvier Beale. Later in the competition, she impersonated former RuPaul's Drag Race contestant Mimi Imfurst during the "Lip Synch Extravaganza Eleganza" challenge. She went on to win the fifth season in May 2013.

In 2022, nine years after her first victory, Monsoon returned for the seventh season of RuPaul's Drag Race All Stars, the franchise's first all-winners season, in which previous champions competed for the title of "Queen of All Queens". She won the Snatch Game with impersonations of actress Natasha Lyonne and entertainer Judy Garland, and also claimed the fourth, fifth, ninth and tenth main challenges. On July 29, 2022, Monsoon won the competition, becoming the first and only contestant to win two RuPaul's Drag Race crowns.

=== Music ===
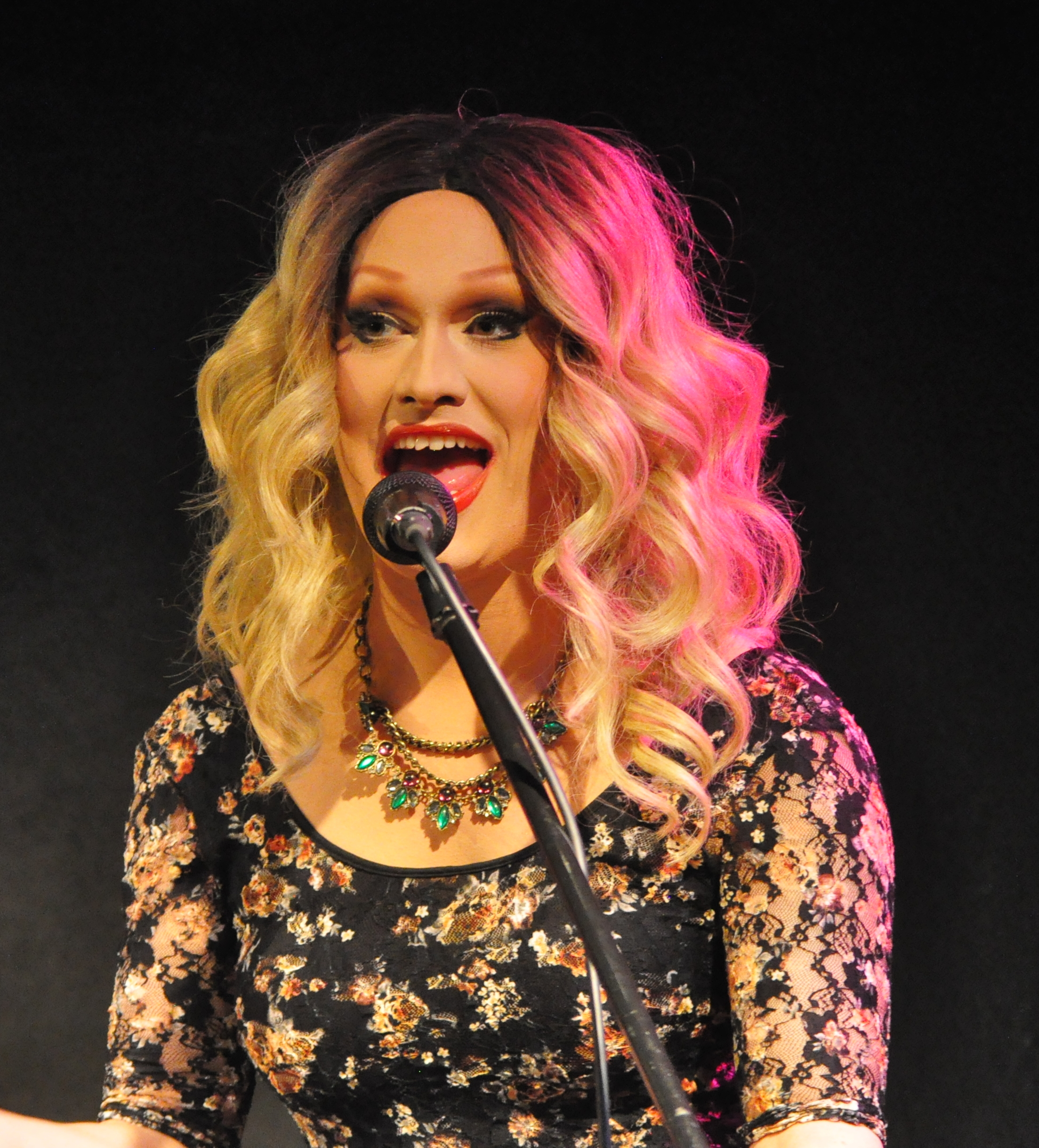
Jinkx Monsoon, 2014

Following her victory on RuPaul's Drag Race in 2013, Jinkx Monsoon expanded her career into music, establishing herself as a recording artist alongside her work in drag, theatre and comedy. Her recordings have drawn on influences including cabaret, jazz, musical theatre, traditional pop, grunge and ska.

Monsoon released her debut studio album, The Inevitable Album, through Sidecar Records on May 6, 2014. Influenced by performers including Bette Midler, Marlene Dietrich, Peggy Lee, Amanda Palmer, and Regina Spektor, the album blended blues, jazz, traditional pop and cabaret. Later that year, Monsoon released the single "The Bacon Shake", featuring Fred Schneider of The B-52s. In 2015, she followed the album with the remix collection ReAnimated and The Inevitable Commentary Album, which featured commentary accompanying the original recordings.

Monsoon's second studio album, The Ginger Snapped, was released through Producer Entertainment Group on January 12, 2018. Marking a stylistic departure from her debut, the album drew inspiration from 1990s grunge, garage rock and ska, and featured guest appearances by Amanda Palmer, Fred Schneider and Lady Rizo. To promote the album, Monsoon released an animated music video for "Cartoons and Vodka", in which her character appeared in the styles of numerous animated series, including Betty Boop, The Jetsons, Sailor Moon, Steven Universe, Adventure Time and Rick and Morty, among others.

Monsoon continued recording with longtime collaborator BenDeLaCreme, releasing the soundtrack album The Jinkx & DeLa Holiday Special in conjunction with their 2020 holiday film of the same name. A live album, Red Head Redemption, followed in 2023. Monsoon also began the astrology-inspired Virgo Odyssey project with the release of the extended play The Virgo Odyssey: Prologue in 2022, followed by The Virgo Odyssey: Leo Moon in 2026.

=== Stage and cabaret career ===
Following her victory on RuPaul's Drag Race in 2013, Hoffer expanded her stage career through cabaret, theatre and touring productions, developing original stage productions while continuing to appear in musicals, concerts and theatrical productions in the United States and internationally.

In January 2013, Hoffer portrayed Hedwig in the Moore Theatre's production of Hedwig and the Angry Inch. The following June, she played Velma Von Tussle in a concert staging of Hairspray presented by the Seattle Men's Chorus and the 5th Avenue Theatre. Later that year, Balagan Theatre revived its production of Hedwig and the Angry Inch for a limited engagement with Hoffer and the original cast.

Hoffer also starred as Kitty Witless in the original one-act cabaret musical The Vaudevillians, opposite musical partner and co-creator Richard Andriessen, who performed as Dr. Dan Von Dandy. The production ran at the Laurie Beechman Theatre in New York City from July to November 2013, extending its engagement several times before touring Australia. Following the Australian tour, Hoffer received a nomination for the Helpmann Award for Best Cabaret Performer in 2014.

Hoffer has frequently collaborated with fellow drag performer and touring partner BenDeLaCreme, with whom she has developed a long-running series of original holiday stage productions. In 2020, the pair co-wrote and starred in The Jinkx and DeLa Holiday Special, a feature-length holiday film based on their Christmas stage productions. They resumed touring with the holiday show in 2021 and continued to present newly written productions in 2022, 2023 and 2024.

In addition to her original productions, Hoffer has appeared in live comedy events and theatrical benefits. In May 2017, she participated in the celebrity roast of theatre columnist Michael Musto alongside Bianca Del Rio, Orfeh, Michael Riedel, Randy Rainbow, Crystal Demure, Countess Luann de Lesseps, Judy Gold and Randy Jones.

Hoffer made her Broadway debut in 2023 as Matron "Mama" Morton in Chicago, becoming the first drag performer to play the role on Broadway. She returned to the production in 2024 before portraying Audrey in the Off-Broadway revival of Little Shop of Horrors. After making her Carnegie Hall debut in 2025, Hoffer returned to Broadway as Ruth in Pirates! The Penzance Musical. Later that year, she was cast as Mary Todd Lincoln in Oh, Mary! on Broadway before reprising the role in her West End debut at London's Trafalgar Theatre in 2026.

=== Television and streaming ===
Monsoon voiced the character Emerald on Steven Universe in the episode "Lars of the Stars".

She played Tallulah/Dennis, the owner of Lipstick Lounge in an episode of Blue Bloods entitled "Manhattan Queens", which aired on January 31, 2014. In 2015, Monsoon joined the cast of Wes Hurley's comedy series Capitol Hill.

In May 2017, Monsoon appeared in the celebrity roast of Michael Musto alongside Bianca Del Rio, Orfeh, Michael Riedel, Randy Rainbow, Crystal Demure, Countess Luann de Lesseps, Judy Gold, and Randy Jones. The roast which was produced by Daniel DeMello and directed by Rachel Klein, was hosted by Bruce Vilanch and introduced by Rosie O'Donnell.

In 2020, Monsoon appeared in the Hulu original Christmas film Happiest Season.

Monsoon was cast in the fourteenth series of Doctor Who (Season 1), produced by BBC and Disney+. Monsoon played the villain "Maestro" in the episode "The Devil's Chord", which aired in May 2024.

== Recognition ==
In June 2019, a panel of judges from New York magazine placed Monsoon 18th on their list of "the most powerful drag queens in America", a ranking of 100 former Drag Race contestants.

In 2013, Monsoon was chosen as one of the Artists of the Year by City Arts magazine along with Megan Griffiths, Macklemore, Ryan Lewis, and Wes Hurley.

== Personal life ==
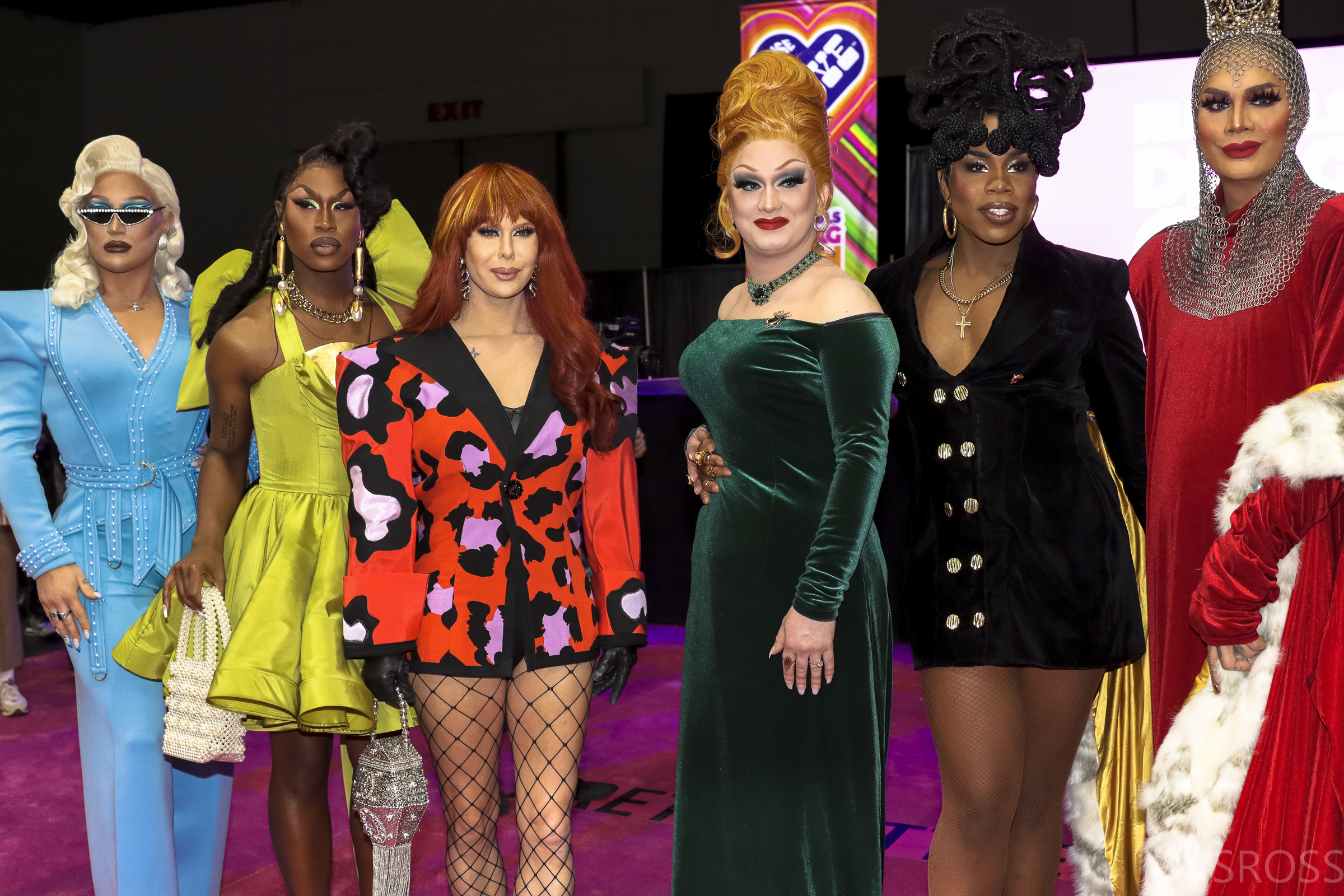
Jinkx Monsoon with her All Stars 7 castmates, minus Jaida Essence Hall and Yvie Oddly

In 2017, Hoffer stated she identified as "non-gendered" or non-binary, and went by singular they pronouns when not in drag. In an April 2017 interview, Monsoon stated, "I've never identified as fully male. I've always identified as more gender fluid or gender ambiguous, but I never knew the vocabulary to explain it for myself."

In a 2024 interview, Monsoon stated that she identifies as trans-femme non-binary and uses she/her pronouns. In the same interview, she said she had begun hormone replacement therapy and undergone facial feminization surgery. In 2025, she stated that she identifies as pansexual.

Hoffer struggles with alcoholism and substance abuse. She is a cannabis user and "a huge weed advocate". She had been hit by a car while intoxicated and almost hit again a few years later in 2019 while "blackout drunk".

Hoffer has narcolepsy, a fact that she revealed in the season five premiere of RuPaul's Drag Race.

In January 2021, Hoffer married her partner Michael Abbott in a small ceremony at home with their friends and family witnessing through video call. The marriage was officiated by comedian Deven Green. In February 2024, Abbott announced they had separated.

In April 2024, Hoffer legally changed her name to Hera Hoffer, but still kept her stage name of Jinkx Monsoon.

She had lived in Seattle, Washington, up until 2018. In October 2018, she moved back to Portland and currently lives in a house named Monsoon Manor.

=== Political views ===
Hoffer writes on her Instagram and Twitter accounts about her views on US President Donald Trump and LGBT equality. She is a Democratic Party supporter and donated to both Elizabeth Warren's and Bernie Sanders's campaigns to be the Democratic nominee for president in 2020. She has spoken out in support of Palestine.

== Artistry ==
Hoffer's drag persona is inspired by her mother and the comedians Lucille Ball, Maria Bamford, Deven Green, and Sarah Silverman. Her drag persona's last name, Monsoon, is derived from the character Edina Monsoon from the British sitcom Absolutely Fabulous. Hoffer also performs as the drag character Deirdre A. Irwin, who is a Southern medium.

== Discography ==
=== Albums ===
==== Studio albums ====
| Title | Details |
|---|---|
| The Inevitable Album | Released: May 6, 2014; Label: Sidecar Records; Formats: CD, digital download, streaming |
| The Ginger Snapped | Released: January 12, 2018; Label: Producer Entertainment Group; Formats: CD, digital download, streaming |

==== Live albums ====
| Title | Details |
|---|---|
| Red Head Redemption | Released: May 23, 2023; Label: Comedy Dynamics; Formats: digital download, streaming |

==== Soundtrack albums ====
| Title | Details |
|---|---|
| The Jinkx & Dela Holiday Special (with BenDeLaCreme) | Released: December 11, 2020; Label: Self-released; Formats: LP, digital download, streaming |

==== Remix albums ====
| Title | Details |
|---|---|
| ReAnimated | Released: October 13, 2015; Label: Sidecar Records, Producer Entertainment Group, Streaming; Format: CD, Digital download |

==== Commentary albums ====
| Title | Details |
|---|---|
| The Inevitable Commentary Album | Released: July 2, 2014; Label: Sidecar Records, Producer Entertainment Group; Formats: digital download, streaming |

==== Extended plays ====
| Title | Details |
|---|---|
| The Virgo Odyssey: Prologue | Released: August 12, 2022; Label: self-released; Formats: digital download, streaming |

- The Virgo Odyssey: Leo Moon (2026)

=== Singles ===
| Song | Year | Album |
|---|---|---|
| "Coffee & Wine" | 2014 | The Inevitable Album |
| "The Bacon Shake" (featuring Fred Schneider) | 2014 | The Inevitable Album |
| "Creep" | 2014 | The Inevitable Album |
| "Hold On JMX (GlitterMix)" (featuring Jean Morisoon) | 2015 | ReAnimated |
| "Cartoons and Vodka" | 2018 | The Ginger Snapped |
| "Know-It-All" | 2022 | The Virgo Odyssey: Prologue |
| "Internationolidays" (with BenDeLaCreme) | 2022 | Non-album single |
| "Strange Magic" | 2022 | The Virgo Odyssey: Prologue |
| "Space & Time" | 2022 | The Virgo Odyssey: Prologue |
| "Looking at the Lights" (with BenDeLaCreme) | 2022 | Non-album singles |
| "The Lavender Song" | 2023 | Non-album singles |

=== Featured singles ===
| Song | Year | Album |
|---|---|---|
| "Can I Get an Amen?" (RuPaul featuring the Cast of RuPaul's Drag Race, season 5) | 2013 | Non-album singles |
| "Schizophrenic" (Two Dudes in Love featuring Jinkx Monsoon) | 2013 | Non-album singles |
| "Bring It" (Manila Luzon featuring Jinkx Monsoon) | 2013 | Non-album singles |
| "Legends" (Cast Version) (RuPaul featuring the Cast of RuPaul's Drag Race All Stars, season 7) | 2022 | Non-album singles |
| "2gether 4eva" (The Other Girls) (with the Cast of RuPaul's Drag Race All Stars, season 7) | 2022 | Non-album singles |

- "Planet Yes" (2026)

=== Other appearances ===
| Song | Year | Other Artist(s) | Album |
|---|---|---|---|
| "Red & Green" | 2015 | N/A | Christmas Queens |
| "Passive Aggressive Christmas" | 2016 | Major Scales | Christmas Queens 2 |
| "Hanukkah, Oh Hanukkah" | 2017 | N/A | Christmas Queens 3 |
| "The Auld Lang Syne Song" | 2017 | N/A | Christmas Queens 3 |
| "Jingle Bell Rock" | 2018 | N/A | Christmas Queens 4 |
| "I Wanna Fuck a Ghost" | 2025 | Erika Henningsen, Jack Plotnick | Helluva Boss: Season Two (Original Soundtrack) |

=== Music videos ===
| Song | Year | Director |
|---|---|---|
| "Jinkxalicious" | 2011 | Alex Berry |
| "Coffee & Wine" | 2014 | Alex Berry |
| "The Bacon Shake" | 2014 | Steve Willis |
| "Creep" | 2014 | Steve Willis |
| "Hold On JMX (GlitterMix)" | 2015 | Steve Willis |
| "Red & Green" | 2015 | Santiago Felipé |
| "Cartoons & Vodka" | 2018 | Mac Kerman |
| "Just Me (The Gender Binary Blues)" | 2018 | Santiago Felipé |
| "She Evil" | 2018 | Brad Hammer, Shawn Adeli |
| "Strange Magic" | 2022 | Frank Correa |
| "Know-It-All" | 2022 | Assaad Yacoub |

== Filmography ==
=== Film ===
| Year | Title | Role |
|---|---|---|
| 2011 | Waxie Moon in Fallen Jewel | Herself/Davey |
| 2013 | East of Adin | Anthony Johnson |
| 2014 | Drag Becomes Him | Herself |
| 2019 | Trixie Mattel: Moving Parts | Herself |
| 2019 | The Queens | Herself |
| 2020 | Happiest Season | Em K. Ultra |
| 2020 | The Jinkx & Dela Holiday Special | Herself |

=== Television ===
| Year | Title | Role | Notes |
|---|---|---|---|
| 2013 | RuPaul's Drag Race | Herself | Season 5 – Winner |
| 2013 | RuPaul's Drag Race: Untucked | Herself | |
| 2013 | NewNowNext Awards | Herself | |
| 2014 | Blue Bloods | Tallulah/Dennis | Episode: "Manhattan Queens" |
| 2014 | RuPaul's Drag Race | Herself (guest) | Season 6 – 2 episodes |
| 2015 | RuPaul's Drag Race | Herself (guest) | Season 7 – "Countdown to the Crown" – Guest |
| 2016 | RuPaul's Drag Race | Herself (guest) | Season 8 – 2 episodes |
| 2016 | Gay for Play Game Show Starring RuPaul | Herself (guest) | 1 episode |
| 2018 | Steven Universe | Emerald (voice) | Season 5 – "Lars of the Stars" |
| 2018 | Mighty Magiswords | Hairmosa (voice) | Season 2 – "To Balderly Go" |
| 2018 | RuPaul's Drag Race | Herself | Season 10 – "10s Across the Board" – Guest |
| 2018 | Bravest Warriors | Jenna (voice) | 3 episodes |
| 2019 | RuPaul's Drag Race | Herself | Season 11 – "Snatch Game At Sea" – Guest |
| 2019 | Blame the Hero | The Queen | 1 episode |
| 2020 | AJ and the Queen | Edie | Episode 2 |
| 2020 | Blood & Makeup: The Last Laugh of Blah Blah the Clown | Melora Oswald | 3 episodes |
| 2022 | RuPaul's Drag Race All Stars | Herself | Season 7 – Winner |
| 2022 | Countdown to All Stars 7: You’re a Winner Baby | Herself | VH1 special |
| 2022 | The View | Herself | Guest |
| 2023 | Late Night with Seth Meyers | Herself | Guest |
| 2023 | CBS Mornings | Herself | Guest |
| 2023 | Good Morning America | Herself | Guest |
| 2023 | RuPaul's Drag Race | Herself | Season 15 – "Grand Finale" – Guest performance |
| 2023 | Drag Me to Dinner | Herself | Hulu original |
| 2023 | Red Head Redemption | Herself | Amazon Prime original |
| 2023 | HouseBroken | Mrs. P Cockx | Episode: "Who's a Party Pony?" |
| 2023 | Adventure Time: Fionna and Cake | Normulon, Lemongrab, additional voices | 4 episodes |
| 2023 | Teenage Euthanasia | Cafe Cashier | Episode: "A Very Fantasy Vacation" |
| 2023 | Here & Queer | Herself | Episode: "Jinkx Monsoon and BenDeLaCreme" |
| 2024 | Doctor Who | Maestro | Episode: "The Devil's Chord" |
| 2024 | BBC Proms | Maestro | Episode: "Doctor Who at the Proms" |
| 2025 | Krapopolis | Donna (voice) | Episode: "Love Week" |
| 2025 | Resident Alien | Bruce (voice) | Season 4 – 2 episodes |

=== Music videos ===
| Year | Title | Artist | Ref. |
|---|---|---|---|
| 2015 | "Hieeee" | Alaska Thunderfuck | |
| 2017 | "Doom or Destiny" | Blondie | |
| 2018 | "Now or Never" | Blair St. Clair | |

=== Web series ===
| Year | Title | Role |
|---|---|---|
| 2010 | Monsoon Season | Herself |
| 2011 | Drag Becomes Him | Herself |
| 2013 | 31 Days of Jinkx | Herself |
| 2016 | Capitol Hill | Celeste Dahl |
| 2019 | The X Change Rate | Herself |
| 2020 | Blood and Makeup | Melora Oswald |
| 2020–2024 | Helluva Boss | Martha, various characters (7 episodes) |
| 2021 | I Like to Watch | Herself |
| 2022 | Around the Table | Herself |
| 2022 | BuzzFeed Celeb | Herself |
| 2022 | Friendship Test | Herself |
| 2022 | Drip Or Drop? | Herself |
| 2022 | Portrait of a Queen | Herself |
| 2022 | Sketchy Queens | Herself |
| 2023 | The Pit Stop | Herself |
| 2023 | Song Association with ELLE | Herself |
| 2024 | Very Delta | Herself |

== Theatre ==
| Year | Title | Role | Theatre |
|---|---|---|---|
| 2010 | Red Ranger Came Calling | Red Ranger | Book-It Repertory Theatre |
| 2010 | Henry V | Alice | Center House Theatre |
| 2011 | Turning Parlor Tricks | Deirdre A. Irwin | Theatre Off Jackson |
| 2011 | The Threepenny Opera | Filch | Intiman Playhouse |
| 2012 | Rent | Angel Dumott Schunard | 5th Avenue Theatre |
| 2012 | Spring Awakening | Moritz | Balagan Theatre |
| 2013 | Hedwig and the Angry Inch | Hedwig | Moore Theatre |
| 2013 | Hairspray | Velma Von Tussle | 5th Avenue Theatre |
| 2023 | Chicago | Mama Morton | Ambassador Theatre, Broadway |
| 2024 | Little Shop of Horrors | Audrey | Westside Theatre, Off-Broadway |
| 2024 | Chicago | Mama Morton | Ambassador Theatre, Broadway |
| 2025 | Pirates! The Penzance Musical | Ruth | Todd Haimes Theatre, Broadway |
| 2025–2026 | Oh, Mary! | Mary Todd Lincoln | Lyceum Theatre, Broadway |
| 2026 | End of the Rainbow | Judy Garland | Soho Theatre Walthamstow |
| 2026 | Oh, Mary! | Mary Todd Lincoln | Trafalgar Theatre, West End |

== Awards and nominations ==
| Year | Award | Category | Work | Result | Ref. |
|---|---|---|---|---|---|
| 2014 | Helpmann Awards | Best Cabaret Performer | The Vaudevillians | Nominated | |
| 2021 | Queerty Awards | Drag Royalty | Herself | Won | |
| 2021 | Queerty Awards | Lockdown LOL | The Jinkx and DeLa Holiday Special | Won | |
| 2023 | Queerty Awards | Badass | Herself | Won | |
| 2023 | Queerty Awards | Podcast | Hi Jinkx! | Runner-up | |
| 2024 | Queerty Awards | Live Theater | The Jinkx & DeLa Holiday Show | Won | |
| 2025 | Broadway.com Audience Choice Awards | Favorite Featured Actress in a Musical | Pirates! The Penzance Musical | Nominated | |
| 2025 | Drama League Awards | Distinguished Performance | Pirates! The Penzance Musical | Nominated | |

== See also ==
- LGBTQ culture in Seattle
- List of LGBTQ people from Portland, Oregon

Awards and achievements
| Preceded by Sharon Needles | Winner of RuPaul's Drag Race; US season 5 | Succeeded by Bianca Del Rio |
Awards and achievements
| Preceded by Kylie Sonique Love | Winner of RuPaul's Drag Race All Stars; US All Stars 7 | Succeeded by Jimbo |
