= Vagina (album) =

2019 studio album by Alaska Thunderfuck

Studio album by Alaska Thunderfuck
- Released: May 24, 2019
- Genre: Comedy
- Length: 42:11
- Label: Producer Entertainment Group

Alaska Thunderfuck chronology
Amethyst Journey (2018)	Vagina (2019)	Drag: The Musical (Studio Cast Recording) (2022)

Vagina is the third studio album by American drag performer Alaska Thunderfuck, released by Producer Entertainment Group on May 24, 2019. The album's surprise release was announced by Alaska in a television advertisement which aired during the eleventh season of RuPaul's Drag Race. The album's songs were then heavily promoted in her appearance at RuPaul's DragCon LA and during the debut of her new drag pageant. The song "Cellulite" features rapper Big Dipper, and music producers Jodie Harsh and Ellis Miah each contributed to a track. The album reached a peak position of number two on Billboard's Comedy Albums chart.

== Development and composition ==
Vagina is Alaska Thunderfuck's third studio album, following her debut Anus (2015) and follow-up Poundcake (2016). She wrote some of the music in a cabin in the woods while also collaborating with Jeremy Mikush for their 2018 studio album Amethyst Journey, as musical duo Alaska and Jeremy.

Alaska titled the album Vagina in keeping with a theme of "movement through the chakras of the body". She stated that there was no alternative to the title: "I'm just personally much more into vaginas than I am into dicks – I think they're prettier. So we called it that." Alaska had wanted to name her second album 'Vagina', but the title didn't match the songs. She has also said of the title:

My first album was Anus, and the next chakra above that one is the genitals. Naturally, the vagina, the portal of all life, and the passage through which every human being comes into being was the only choice for the album title. In the wake of the current political climate, where women's bodies are being regulated and controlled by men, I think the title grabs people's attention and it's a little dangerous. I like that.

In contrast to Alaska's previous albums, Vagina does not feature fellow RuPaul's Drag Race alumnae as guests. Tomas Costanza co-wrote several tracks. Rapper Big Dipper is featured on the track "Cellulite", and record producers Jodie Harsh and Ellis Miah contributed to "Drip" and "Snaked", respectively.

Alaska stated that Vagina is "a return to form" of her earlier work, with "Hard electronic beats, songs about taboo body parts and lewd sexual acts, some total nonsense, and of course lots and lots of swear words." She expressed faith that listeners would absorb the deeper meaning through the "filth and frivolity" of the lyrics. She told Digital Spy the album's content is about "getting wasted and body parts that you can't talk about on TV" because "I love those things". Alaska has dedicated the title track "to all women everywhere – whether they have a vagina or not". The song "Pride" reportedly "held a lot of resonance" with Alaska, who called the LGBTQ movement "essential".

== Release and promotion ==
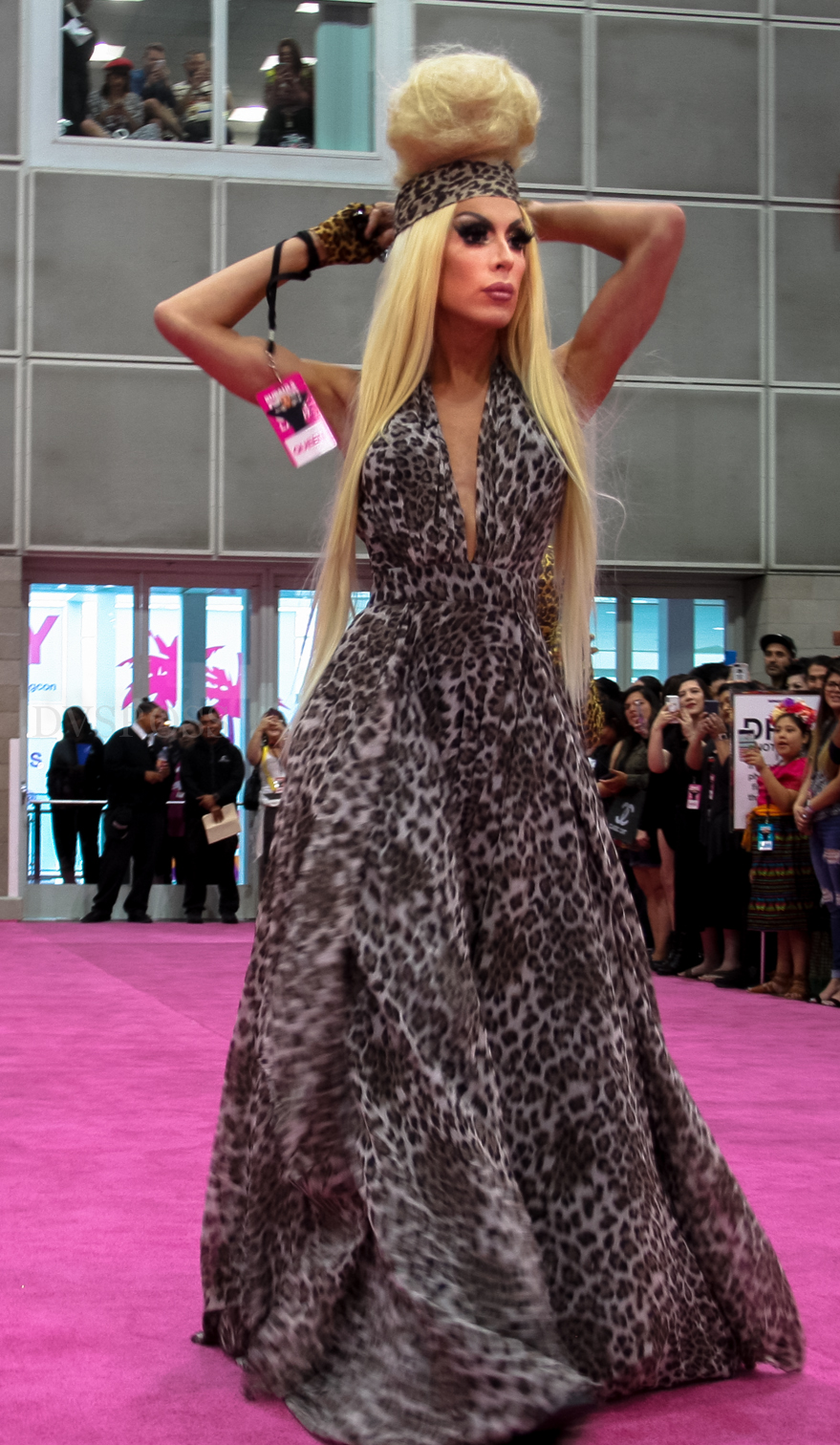
Alaska Thunderfuck at RuPaul's DragCon LA in 2019, where she wore a leopard print outfit to promote her song "Leopard Print".

Alaska announced the release of her album Vagina in a television advertisement which aired on May 24, 2019, during the reunion special of the eleventh season of RuPaul's Drag Race. The album's release that same day was unexpected and preceded her appearance at RuPaul's DragCon LA as well as the May 26 debut of Alaska's inclusive Drag Queen of the Year Pageant.

Referencing her song "Leopard Print", Alaska wore a leopard print dress, headband, and gloves to RuPaul's DragCon LA, where she was accompanied by four "minions" who wore "leopard print bodysuits that fully covered their faces".

During the pageant, hosted by Jackie Beat, the album was heavily promoted and tracks were previewed throughout. Queens and audience members wore leopard print in recognition of her lyric "everything must be leopard print".

== Reception ==
When the album was released, Christopher Rudolph of NewNowNext wrote, "fire up the barbecue because your Memorial Day weekend soundtrack has arrived!", and said songs like "Leopard Print", "Everybody Wants to Fuck Me", and "Pride" were "instantly classic". Instinct's Jeremy Hinks wrote that "Drag Queens are an art unto themselves" and that Vagina demonstrates Alaska "is the essence of the art form" and that "brilliance can be seen in her satire". He said the album "[took] every gay stereotype and [pumped] it full of fluff and steroids", and asserted "Leopard Print" is "making fun of things that would usually bother people with a gay stereotype". MTV News' Evan Ross Katz suggested the songs were a lyrical improvement over those on Anus. The album peaked at number two on the Billboard Comedy Albums chart.

== Track listing ==
Track listing adapted from the Apple Store and Spotify.

No.	Title	Writer(s)	Length
1.	"Vagina"	Justin Honard, Paul Coultrup, Tomas Costanza	3:28
2.	"Leopard Print"	Honard, Coultrup, Costanza	3:08
3.	"Everybody Wants to Fuck Me"	Honard, Coultrup, Costanza	3:32
4.	"Walk into the Club"	Honard, Coultrup, Costanza	3:26
5.	"Getting Kicked Out (Of Micky's on a Monday Night)"	Eren Cannata, Honard, Koil PreAmple, Vito Fun	3:44
6.	"Cellulite" (featuring Big Dipper)	Honard, Coultrup, Costanza	4:03
7.	"Drip" (Jodie Harsh Mix)	Jodie Harsh, Honard	2:57
8.	"Snaked" (Ellis Miah Mix)	Ellis Miah, Honard	3:41
9.	"Frances"	Honard, Coultrup, Costanza	3:05
10.	"Pride"	Honard, Coultrup, Costanza	4:04
11.	"Twisted"	Honard, Coultrup, Costanza	3:15
12.	"The Land of the Midnight Sun"	Honard, Coultrup, Costanza	3:48
Total length:			42:11

== Charts ==
Chart (2019)	Peak position
US Comedy Albums (Billboard)	2
