= Anas (disambiguation) =

Anas is a genus of dabbling ducks.

Anas or ANAS may also refer to:

== Species ==
- Anas albeola, or Bufflehead, a small sea duck
- Anas aucklandica, the Auckland teal
- Anas melleri, Meller's duck
- Anas platyrhynchos, the mallard, a wild duck

== People ==
Anas (أنس) is an Arabic name used by Muslims.

=== Mononym ===
- Anas ibn Malik (612–712), Companion (Sahabi) of Muhammad
- Anas (journalist), Ghanaian anti-corruption journalist

=== Given name ===
- Anas al-Abdah (born 1967), Syrian politician, president of the National Coalition for Syrian Revolutionary and Opposition Forces from March 2016 to May 2017
- Anas Altikriti (born 1968), British activist of Iraqi origin, founder of the Cordoba Foundation
- Anas Aremeyaw Anas, Ghanaian investigative journalist
- Anas Dabour (born 1991), Arab-Israeli footballer
- Anas Alam Faizli (born 1980), Malaysian constructor, oil professional, activist and author
- Anas el-Fiqqi (born 1960), Egyptian politician and government minister
- Anas Edathodika (born 1987), Indian footballer
- Anas Al Khalifa (born 1993), paracanoist
- Anas Osama Mahmoud (born 1995), Egyptian basketball player
- Anas Rashid (born 1980/81), Indian television actor in Indian soap operas
- Anas Khalid Al Saleh (born 1972), Kuwaiti politician
- Anas Sari (born 1977), Syrian footballer
- Anas Sarwar (born 1983), Scottish politician
- Anas Sefrioui (born 1957), Moroccan real estate businessman
- Anas Seidu (1952–2023), Ghanaian footballer
- Anas Sharbini (born 1987), Croatian footballer
- Anas Al-Sharif (1996–2025), Palestinian journalist and videographer
- Anas Urbaningrum (born 1969), Indonesian graft prisoner and politician
- Anas Abu-Yousuf (born 1989), Qatari swimmer

=== Surname ===
- Azwar Anas (1931–2023), Indonesian politician
- Mohammed Anas (born 1994), Ghanaian footballer
- Muhammed Anas (born 1994), Indian sprinter
- Omar Anas (born 1933), Sudanese sportsman, shooter

=== Nom de guerre ===
- Abdullah Anas, an Algerian scholar, nom de guerre of a man who helped Afghanistan mujahideen fight the Soviet invasion in the northern provinces from 1983 to 1992
- Abu Anas al-Shami (1969–2004), real name Omar Yusef Juma'a, Palestinian jihadist from Kuwait
- Abu Anas al-Libi (1964–2015), real name Nazih Abdul-Hamed Nabih al-Ruqai'i, computer specialist for Al-Qaeda from Libya
- Muhannad (jihadist) (1969–2011), real name Melfi Al Hussaini Al Harbi, nom de guerre Abu Anas, a mujahid emir (commander) of Chechnya

== Other uses ==
- American Numismatic and Archaeological Society, a former name of the American Numismatic Society
- Anas (company), formerly "Azienda Nazionale Autonoma delle Strade", a state-owned company that constructs and operates Italian motorways
- Flumen Anas, the Roman name for the river Guadiana in Spain

== See also ==
- Ana (disambiguation)
- Abu Anas (disambiguation)
- Anus (disambiguation)
