= Tongue popping =

Clicking sound made with the tongue

Tongue popping is the act of creating an audible clicking noise for emphasis in conversation using one's tongue.

== Usage ==
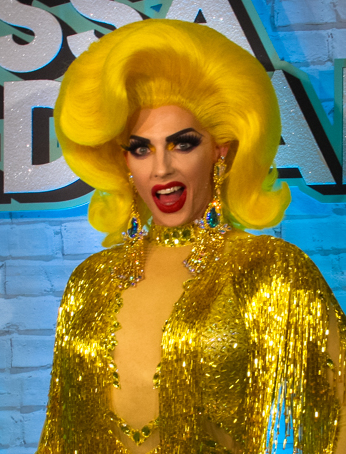
American drag performer Alyssa Edwards (pictured in 2018) helped popularize tongue popping

Tongue popping has been described as the "signature catchphrase" of Alyssa Edwards, an American drag performer most known for competing on RuPaul's Drag Race. According to Jamie Lee Curtis Taete of Vice News, "Via Alyssa, the pop has crossed over into fairly mainstream queer usage. It has a variety of meanings, but is generally used to emphasize something, dismiss another person, or act as an exclamation point." Alyssa Edwards has released a "novelty Christmas song" called "Tongue Pop the Halls". Cheryl Hole of RuPaul's Drag Race UK also tongue pops.

In 2017, Alaska Thunderfuck said, "And then also one of my favorite noises is a tongue pop. [Tongue pops] This is drag. In order to do drag, you have to learn how to do this ... And that’s different from a tongue click, which is a different mechanism, and the differentiation is very important."

Aquaria, Cardi B, Tamar Braxton and Laganja Estranja are also notorious for the skill.

== See also ==
- Alveolar click
