= Lady Red Couture =

American drag performer

- Lady Red Couture in an undated photo
- Born: May 30, 1977; Park City, Utah, U.S.
- Died: July 25, 2020 (aged 43); Los Angeles, California, U.S.
- Other names: Kareemia Baines; Mother Couture
- Occupations: Drag queen; singer; talk show host
- Years active: 1995–2020
- Known for: Hey Qween! with Jonny McGovern
- Musical career
- Genres: Pop; house
- Instrument: Vocals
- Label: PolyGram

Kareemia Baines (May 30, 1977 – July 25, 2020), known professionally as Lady Red Couture, was an American drag queen and singer best known as the co-host of Hey Qween! with Jonny McGovern. Born in Park City, Utah, she relocated to Los Angeles, where she became a fixture of the local drag scene. She released an album, #Stuntqueen, in 2018, and she was featured in a number of other drag queens' singles and music videos throughout the 2010s. She also starred in Judge Lady Red, another web series produced by McGovern. Baines died on July 25, 2020, after a flare-up of cyclic vomiting syndrome, a chronic condition that affected her throughout her life.

== Early life and education ==
Baines was born in Park City, Utah, on May 30, 1977, to Kathleen Barnes. According to Baines's obituary in The New York Times, her father "left the family when she was young and was not a part of her life". She had a younger sister named Krystle Butler. Their mother was a nondenominational Christian minister, and Baines had a strained relationship with her. Ultimately, her mother kicked her out of their home for being transgender.

Baines attended George Washington Preparatory High School in Los Angeles. She was active in extracurricular activities including theatre and marching band, where she played trombone and tuba. As part of the band, she performed in the Rose Parade. After high school, she earned an associate's degree in culinary arts from Salt Lake Community College in Salt Lake County, Utah. In 2001, she graduated from Weber State University. After college, Baines was briefly employed as a chef for Amtrak. When she returned to Los Angeles, she took up work as a "security diva" at Gym Sportsbar and as a "budtender" at a MedMen cannabis shop.

== Career ==
At a time when the word authentic is overused, honey, she was unique. She was 6-foot-7, wore size 16 Converse sneakers with an evening gown, and wore the showbiz eyelashes during the day. And she would drop her voice real low to freak you out.

— Lady Bunny, quoted in Couture's obituary in The New York Times

Lady Red Couture began her drag career in 1995, regularly performing at venues like Hamburger Mary's. She was 6 ft 7 in (2.01 m) in height and stood as tall as 7 ft 2 in (2.18 m) when wearing heels. As a vocalist, she was noted for her wide range and commanding stage presence, which, together with her stature, earned her the nickname "the largest live-singing drag queen". Also known as Mother Couture, she was widely regarded as a staple of the Los Angeles queer nightlife community.

Couture rose to international attention as the co-host of Hey Qween! with Jonny McGovern, a drag-focused talk show that features interviews with RuPaul's Drag Race contestants. She worked at Hey Qween! for eight seasons, from 2014 until her death. She also had a minor role in the 2011 film Leave It on the Floor; starred in Judge Lady Red, a 2015 web series produced by McGovern; and appeared in "Dickmatized", one of McGovern's music videos.

In 2016, Couture toured with the Drag Queens of Comedy. Two years later, in 2018, she released an album called #Stuntqueen in collaboration with Adam Joseph, who also featured her on his EP The Rent. Lady Red Couture also produced a number of live shows, including an adaptation of The Vixen's "Black Girl Magic" in 2019. In June 2020, Harper's Bazaar featured her in its photo series "Striking Portraits of America's Most Legendary Drag Queens". She was known for helping aspiring drag queens learn to sew, do makeup, and perform.

== Personal life ==
Baines was a trans woman. She and McGovern became close friends during the first season of Hey Qween!, and he invited her to move in with him after discovering she was living in a transient hotel.

== Death and legacy ==
On July 19, 2020, Baines was hospitalized in Los Angeles due to cyclic vomiting syndrome, a lifelong chronic condition. She was placed on a breathing tube in intensive care. On July 24, McGovern posted on social media that she appeared to be improving and would be moved out of intensive care. However, the following day, Baines died from complications of the illness. McGovern announced her death in an Instagram post. He had been raising money for Baines's medical expenses via GoFundMe and Venmo, and he subsequently redirected the funds to her family and funeral costs. An illegitimate GoFundMe page was also set up by an unknown party, but it was swiftly deactivated after McGovern discovered and publicly condemned it. A number of queer celebrities—including Isis King, Justin Tranter, and "virtually the entire cast of RuPaul's Drag Race"—expressed shock and sadness at her death, and they shared tributes to her life and work. In a report on her death, Billboard called Baines "a pillar of the drag and trans community".

In November 2020, McGovern released an EP titled Flowers (Songs to Lady Red), a tribute to Couture produced in collaboration with Adam Joseph. The same month, Hey Qween! aired an episode called "The Lady Red Memorial Special", in which performers including Honey Davenport, Jackie Beat, Sherry Vine, The Vixen, Latrice Royale, and Peppermint shared memories of Couture.

== Discography ==
=== Studio albums ===
| Title | Details | Ref(s) |
|---|---|---|
| #Stuntqueen | Released: 2018; Label: self-released; Formats: digital download | |

=== EPs ===
| Title | Details | Ref(s) |
|---|---|---|
| The Rent (Adam Joseph feat. Lady Red Couture) | Released: 2018; Label: PolyGram; Formats: digital download | |

=== Singles ===
==== As lead artist ====
| Title | Year | Album | Ref |
|---|---|---|---|
| "24 Inch Magic" (feat. Adam Joseph) | 2017 | #Stuntqueen | |

==== As featured artist ====
| Title | Year | Album | Ref |
|---|---|---|---|
| "Ballroom Bliss" (Phillip Evelyn feat. Ephraim Sykes, Andre Meyers, Lady Red Couture, Roxy Wood, Cameron Koa, Daveione Williams & James Allsop) | 2013 | Leave It on the Floor (Original Movie Soundtrack) | |
| "His Name Is Shawn" (Clent Bowers feat. Charlo Crossley, Oren Waters, Miss Barbie-Q, Lady Red Couture, Phillip Evelyn, Andre Meyers, Donald Webber & Ledisi) | 2013 | Leave It on the Floor (Original Movie Soundtrack) | |
| "Let's Do Drag" (Alaska Thunderfuck feat. Lady Red Couture) | 2016 | Poundcake | |

== Filmography ==
=== Feature films ===
| Year | Title | Role | Ref |
|---|---|---|---|
| 2011 | Leave It on the Floor | Christina Allure | |

=== Internet series ===
| Year | Title | Role | Producer | Ref(s) |
|---|---|---|---|---|
| 2014 | Homie$ for Ca$h | Guest (with Jonny McGovern) | World of Wonder | |
| 2014–2020 | Hey Qween! | Co-host (with Jonny McGovern) | Jonny McGovern | |
| 2015 | Judge Lady Red | Herself | Jonny McGovern | |

=== Music videos ===
| Year | Title | Artist | Role | Ref |
|---|---|---|---|---|
| 2011 | "Dickmatized" | Jonny McGovern | Cameo | |
| 2016 | "TuckBusters" | Jackie Beat, Bianca Del Rio, Lady Red Couture & Sherry Vine | Main | |
| 2016 | "Tongue Pop the Halls" | Alyssa Edwards | Cameo | |
