= Anus (disambiguation) =

In anatomy, the anus is the opening at the lower end of the digestive tract.

Anus may also refer to:

- Anus language
- Anu (tribe)
- Anuš, the spelling of Enosh in the religion of Mandaeism
- Anusim, Jews forced to convert to another faith who still secretly practice Judaism
- Anus (album), an album by Alaska Thunderfuck

== Places ==
- Anus, Yonne, France
- Anus, Indonesia, a small village in Indonesia
- Anus, Batangas, Philippines, in the province of Batangas
- Anus, Laguna, Philippines, a small village in the province of Laguna
- Olonets, Russia, known in the Olonets Karelian language as Anus or Anuksenlinnu

== See also ==
- Anu (disambiguation)
- Enos (disambiguation), sometimes pronounced similarly
