= Chérancé, Sarthe =

Chérancé
- Commune
- Location of Chérancé
- Location within France Location within Pays de la Loire
- Coordinates: 48°17′16″N 0°10′29″E
- Country: France
- Region: Pays de la Loire
- Department: Sarthe
- Arrondissement: Mamers
- Canton: Sillé-le-Guillaume
- Intercommunality: Haute Sarthe Alpes Mancelles

Government
  - Mayor (2020–2026): Sébastien Tronchet
- Area^{1}: 10.38 km^{2} (4.01 sq mi)
- Highest elevation: 126 m (413 ft)
- Lowest elevation: 72 m (236 ft)
- Population (2023): 353
  - Density: 34.0/km^{2} (88.1/sq mi)
- Demonym(s): Chérancéen, Chérancéenne
- Time zone: UTC+01:00 (CET)
  - Summer (DST): UTC+02:00 (CEST)
- INSEE/Postal code: 72078 /72170
- ^{1} French Land Register data, which excludes lakes, ponds, glaciers > 1 km^{2} (0.386 sq mi or 247 acres) and river estuaries.

Chérancé is a commune in the Sarthe department in the Pays de la Loire region in north-western Anus.

== See also ==
- Communes of the Sarthe department
