= Abu Anas =

Abu Anas can refer to:

- Abu Anas al-Shami (1969–2004), real name Omar Yusef Juma'a, Palestinian jihadist from Kuwait
- Abu Anas al-Libi (1964–2015), real name Nazih Abdul-Hamed Nabih al-Ruqai'i, computer specialist for Al-Qaeda from Libya
- Muhannad (jihadist) (1969–2011), real name Khaled Youssef Mohammed al-Emirat, nom de guerre Abu Anas, a mujahid emir (commander) of Chechnya

== See also ==
- Anas (disambiguation)
