= ROY G BIV BBT =

2021 song by Alaska Thunderfuck

Single by Alaska Thunderfuck
- Released: May 21, 2021
- Length: 2:33
- Label: Producer Entertainment Group
- Songwriters: Ashley Levy; Justin Honard; Nick Laughlin; Paul Coultrup; Toby Marlow; Tomas Costanza
- Producer: Thomas Costanza

Alaska Thunderfuck singles chronology
"Let It Snow (Ivan and Peter Mix)" (2020)	"ROY G BIV BBT" (2021)	"Red" (2021)

"ROY G BIV BBT" is a song by Alaska Thunderfuck, released in 2021. The song has been described as a "pride anthem".

== Background and composition ==
The song's title refers to ROYGBIV, an acronym for the sequence of hues commonly described as making up a rainbow (red, orange, yellow, green, blue, indigo, and violet), plus the addition of "BBT" to represent black, brown and trans. Alaska Thunderfuck co-wrote the song and said:

I love colors; I love rainbows, and I love speaking assertively over a pounding, techno beat. This is a Pride anthem dedicated to the updated version of the Pride flag, which includes black, brown, and trans rainbow stripes. I look forward to a post-quarantine Pride season where we can dance, dance, dance with our hands above our heads, heads, heads.

In an interview with High Times, Alaska said of the song and its origins:

Well, my dear friend Nick, Nick Loughlin, we like to collaborate on everything together all the time. He said, 'You've got to do a pride song called ROY G BIV because that was our way of remembering the colors of the rainbow in order in school.' We then took it from there and we worked with the amazing writers at Killingsworth and Toby Marlo. Now, there's a new pride flag; the pride flag doesn't stop at violet. Now, we have black and brown and the trans colors in there as well. This was the updated celebration of the new pride flag.

== Reception ==
Billboard's Stephen Daw said Alaska "pulls out all the stops for a campy, funny, excellent Pride anthem you'll be bumping all the way through June".
