= Poundcake (album) =

2016 studio album by Alaska Thunderfuck

Studio album by Alaska Thunderfuck
- Released: October 14, 2016
- Length: 40:47
- Label: Producer Entertainment Group
- Producers: Tomas Costanza; Paul Coultrup; Ashley Levy; Markaholic

Alaska Thunderfuck chronology
Anus (2015)	Poundcake (2016)	Amethyst Journey (2018)

Poundcake is the second studio album by American drag performer and recording artist Alaska Thunderfuck, released by Producer Entertainment Group on October 14, 2016. The album features RuPaul's Drag Race contestants Adore Delano, Gia Gunn, and Miss Fame, and drag performer Jackie Beat.

"Puppet" was released as the lead single, and an accompanying music video was directed by Santiago Felipe. Music videos were also created for "The T", which features Adore Delano and other Drag Race competitors Coco Montrese, Katya, Tatianna, and Trixie Mattel, "Stun", which features appearances by Gia Gunn, Courtney Act, and Mariah Paris Balenciaga, as well as "Come to Brazil". Alaska sold dolls of Lil' Poundcake, the character she co-created on the show's fifth season, which served as an inspiration for the album, and toured with a rock music show called Poundcake World Tour. In the United States, the album peaked at number four on Billboard's Dance/Electronic Albums chart, number three on the Heatseekers Albums chart, and number 28 on the Independent Albums chart.

== Composition ==
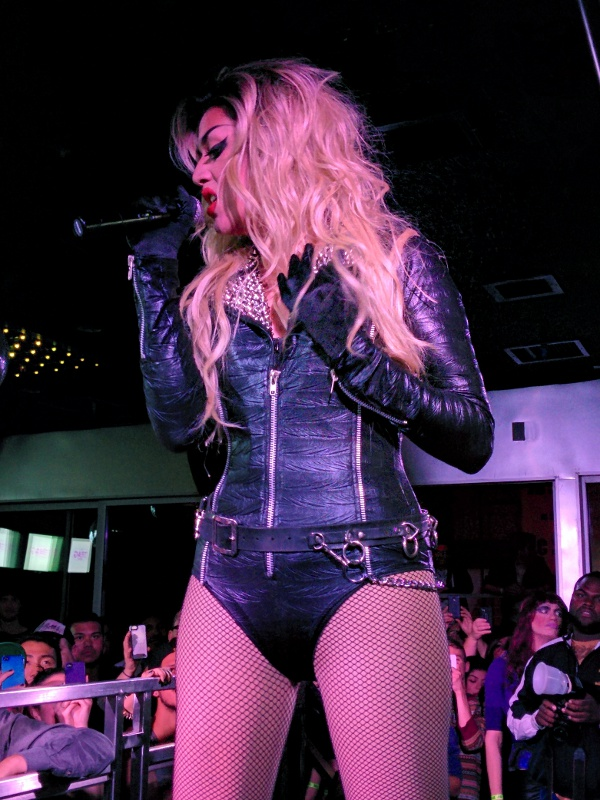
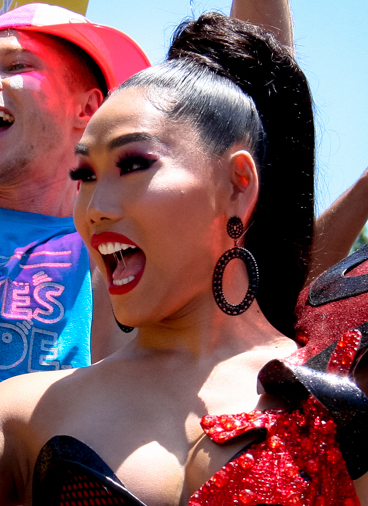
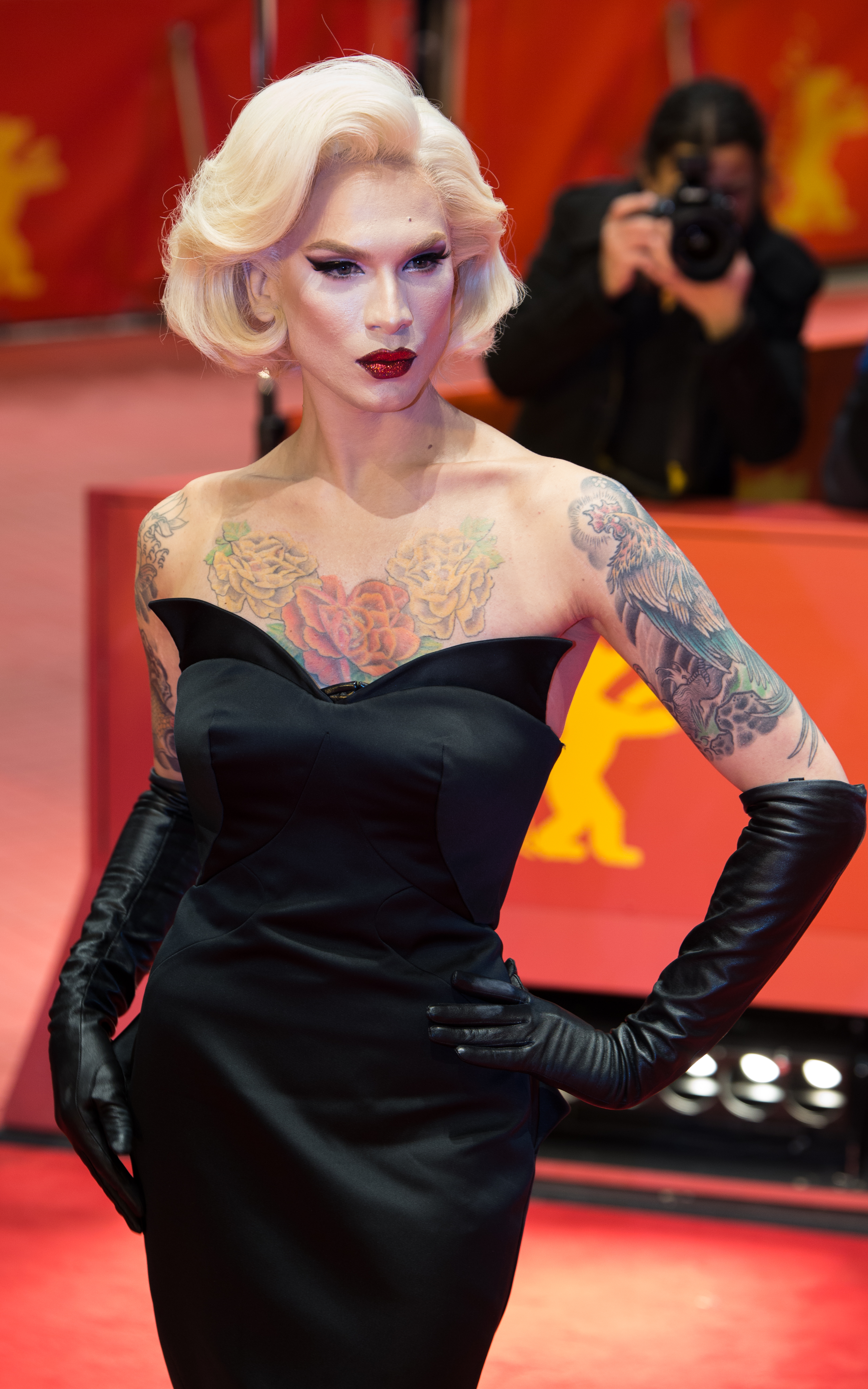
Fellow RuPaul's Drag Race contestants Adore Delano (left), Gia Gunn (center), and Miss Fame (right) are each featured on one of the album's tracks.

The album's title and the song "Puppet" refer to the "foul-mouthed" puppet Lil' Poundcake, a "deranged and angry" beauty pageant "competitor from hell" created by Alaska and Lineysha Sparx on the fifth season (episode "Draggle Rock") of RuPaul's Drag Race; Alaska later dressed like Lil' Poundcake on the second season of RuPaul's Drag Race All Stars and sold plush dolls of the character.

Fellow Drag Race contestants Adore Delano, Gia Gunn, and Miss Fame are featured on "The T", "Stun", and "Chicken", respectively. "The T" has been described as a diss track, and features Alaska performing freestyle rap with "some interesting facts about her past relationships, as well as ad-libbing by Adore Delano". According to Gay Star News, "the song addresses a lot of the dirty deets that went down in this past season like Adore Delano's unexpected exit, as well as Alaska's other personal issues such as sobriety, her ex aka drag queen Sharon Needles who's the winner of RPDR Season 4, and her friendship with drag star Willam". "Let's Do Drag" features Hey Qween!'s Lady Red Couture. The song "Race Chaser" inspired Alaska's podcast with Drag Race queen Willam Belli. Jeremy Mikush is featured on the a cappella closing track "It Is What It Is". Mikush had previously worked with Alaska on "Nails" and "Your Makeup Is Terrible" for her debut album Anus (2015), and the duo released their debut studio album Amethyst Journey as Alaska and Jeremy in 2018.

== Release and promotion ==
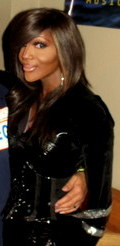
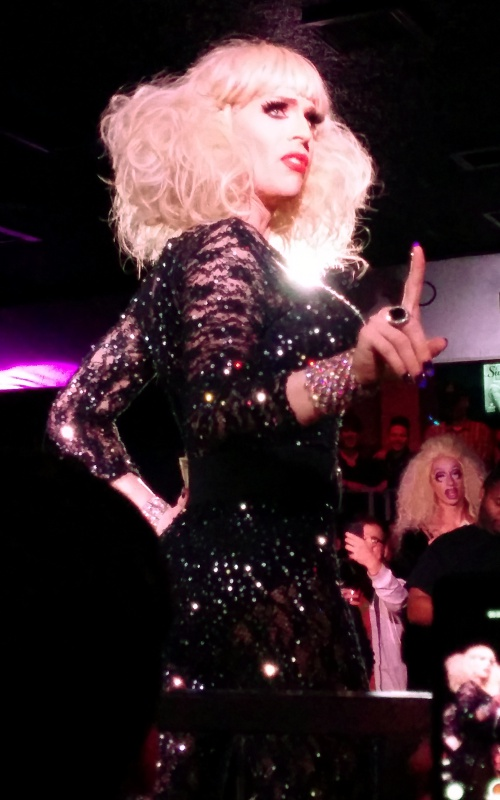
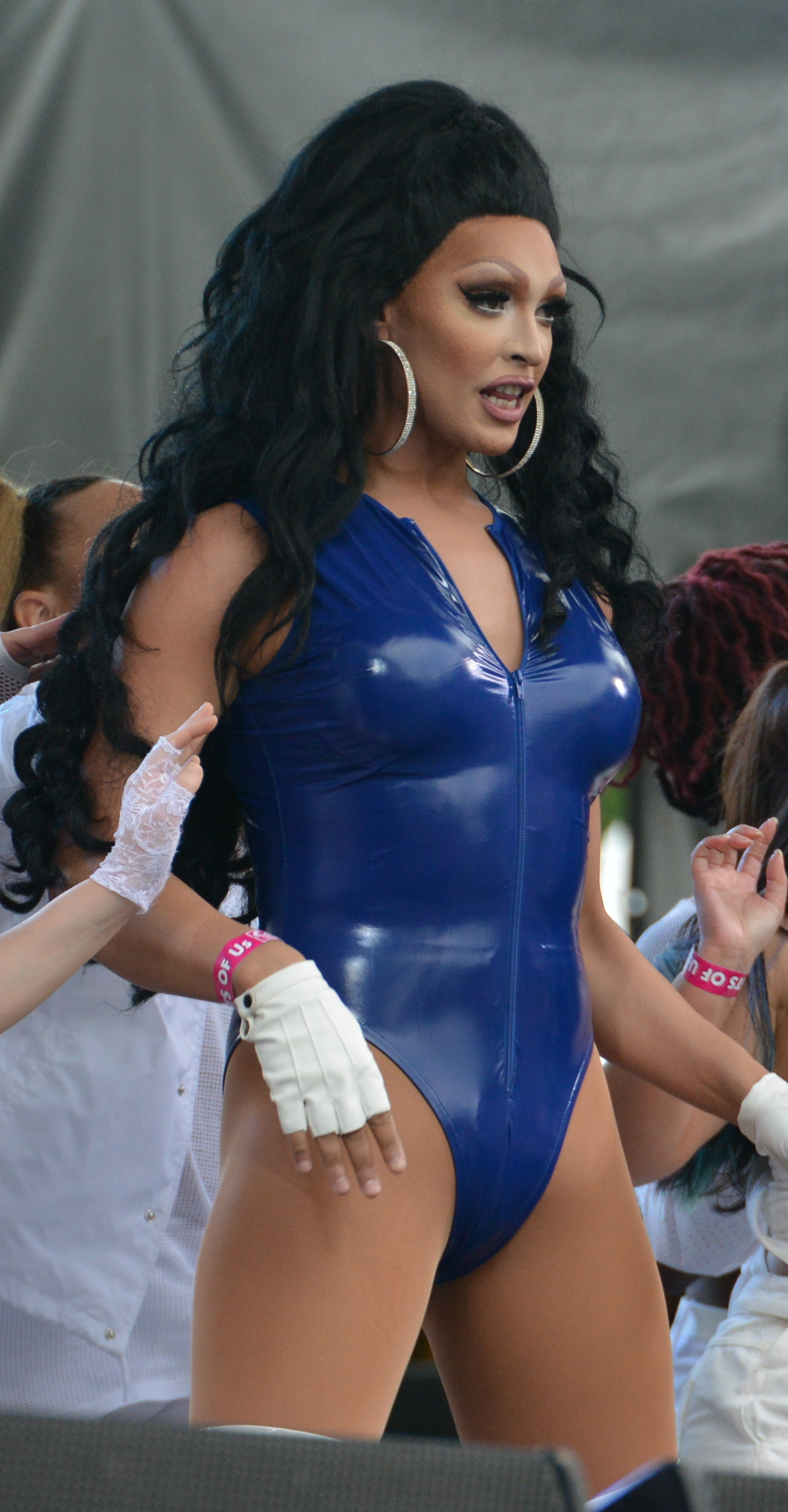
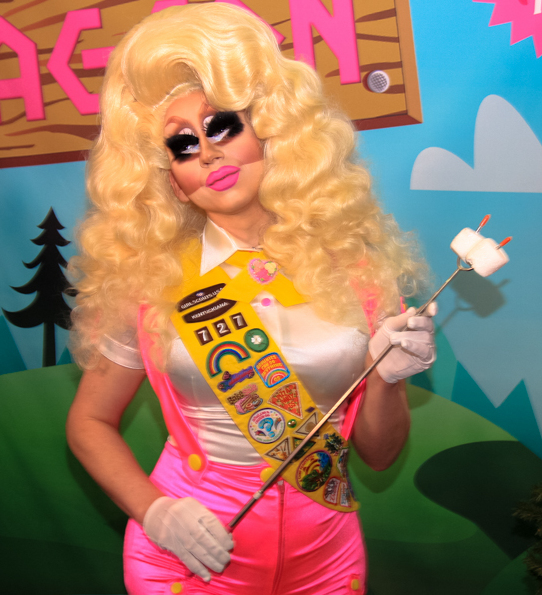
The music video for "The T" features appearances by fellow RuPaul's Drag Race contestants Coco Montrese (top left), Katya (top right), Tatianna (bottom left), and Trixie Mattel (bottom right).

Poundcake was released by Producer Entertainment Group on October 14, 2016. The album was promoted by a music video for the lead single "Puppet", which was released in mid-September. The music video, directed by Santiago Felipe, shows Lil' Poundcake "pulling a Wall Street heist with her cohorts and spitting some hilariously foul lyrics"; according to Billboard magazine's Patrick Crowley, "After losing a beauty pageant of sorts, a crazed Gertrude Poundcakenstein goes on a crime spree. Joined by her sidekicks, Juicy Liu and Chocolate Puddin, she robs a bank and wreaks havoc on Lower Manhattan." Adam Salandra of Logo TV's NewNowNext wrote, "When the puppet with daddy issues loses a beauty pageant to Baby Thunder Thighs in the video, she also loses her mind, transforming into an evil version of Lil' Poundcake before our very eyes. With a freshly painted mug and revenge on her mind, she sets out on a crime spree with tragic results." The video references fellow queen Roxxxy Andrews and features cameos by pornographic film actors Rocco Steele and Boomer Banks. Alaska's friend Nick Laughlin choreographed the video. "Let's Do Drag" was released at the same time as "Puppet".

The music video for "The T" premiered on October 13 and features Drag Race queens Adore Delano, Coco Montrese, Katya, Tatianna, and Trixie Mattel, in a final scene reminiscent of Leonardo da Vinci's 15th-century mural painting The Last Supper. Denver-based Geek Myth Productions directed the video.

Alaska released a music video for "Stun" featuring Gia Gunn and Drag Race queens Courtney Act and Mariah Paris Balenciaga in February 2017. In the video, Alaska and Gia Gunn recreate RuPaul's looks from season 6 and carry large purses as a reference to Bob the Drag Queen. Glenn Garner of Out said of the video: "Sporting their tightest clubbing dresses in the back of a limo, they all pop champagne and play with PayPal. Alaska and Gia eventually adjourn to the streets, where they have a dance-off and hang out in dumpsters with garbage men. There's also the return of a certain hula hoop purse that we'd hoped we'd never see again." NewNowNext's Christopher Rudolph wrote, "Whether they're giving banjee realness in a colorful alley or going full glamazon with Courtney Act in the back of a limo, these girls have never looked better."

In May, Alaska released a commercial for her Lil' Poundcake doll, featuring Drag Race contestants Jiggly Caliente and Raja. Alaska also supported the album with her Poundcake World Tour, a rock music show featuring Jackie Beat as an opening act. In November, a music video for "Come to Brazil" was released; the video was filmed in Brazil and sees Alaska "taking in everything the country has to offer like soccer, colorful outfits and beautiful boys".

== Reception ==
Poundcake debuted in the top five of Billboard's Dance/Electronic Albums and Heatseekers Albums charts. Daisy Jones of Vice said the album "will leave you gagging". Darian Lusk of The New York Observer included "Come to Brazil" in his list of "The Best Songs of 2017 by 'RuPaul’s Drag Race' Contestants". He wrote:

The message of this song is actually pretty straight forward: you should go to Brazil... this Shakira send-up is a winner, with funny spoken word verses and an anthemic chorus that would definitely sound great live. On top of that, this video is a blast, showcasing some iconic outfits from arguably the most famous queen of Drag Race. I love that Alaska can cater to her Latin American fans while putting out universally accessible pop.

Billboard's Patrick Crowley described "The T" as "tea-spilling" and "Minaj-esque". The magazine included "Puppet" in a 2019 list of the "20 Best Songs from 'RuPaul's Drag Race' Queens", saying: "A deliriously upbeat, catchy hook pairs well with the unrepentantly filthy (and hysterical) lyrics on this standout track ... She has a number of excellent songs, but the Lil' Poundcake-inspired 'Puppet' is undeniable."

== Track listing ==
Track listing adapted from AllMusic.

No.	Title	Writer(s)	Length
1.	"The T" (featuring Adore Delano)	Tomas Costanza, Paul Coultrup, Ashley Levy, Alaska Thunderfuck	3:24
2.	"Let's Do Drag" (featuring Lady Red Couture)	Costanza, Coultrup, Levy, Alaska Thunderfuck	2:52
3.	"Slaytina"	Costanza, Coultrup, Levy, Alaska Thunderfuck	4:00
4.	"Stun" (featuring Gia Gunn)	Costanza, Coultrup, Levy, Alaska Thunderfuck	3:07
5.	"Puppet"	Costanza, Coultrup, Levy, Alaska Thunderfuck	3:12
6.	"O, Brasil..."	Jeremy Mark Mikush, Alaska Thunderfuck	0:41
7.	"Come to Brazil"	Alaska Thunderfuck	3:40
8.	"Diamond in the Rough"	Costanza, Coultrup, Levy, Alaska Thunderfuck	3:38
9.	"High"	Costanza, Coultrup, Levy, Alaska Thunderfuck	3:18
10.	"Chicken" (featuring Miss Fame)	Costanza, Coultrup, Levy, Alaska Thunderfuck	3:03
11.	"Race Chaser"	Costanza, Coultrup, Levy, Alaska Thunderfuck	3:46
12.	"I Invented That" (featuring Jackie Beat)	Costanza, Coultrup, Levy, Alaska Thunderfuck	3:10
13.	"It Is What It Is" (featuring Nick Laughlin and Jeremy Mark Mikush)	Costanza, Coultrup, Levy, Alaska Thunderfuck	2:48
Total length:			40:39

== Personnel ==
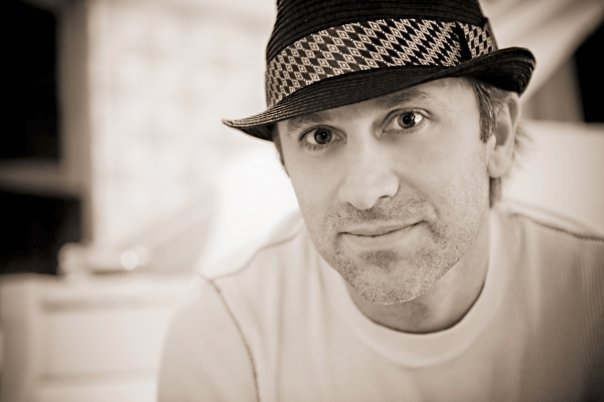
American record producer Tomas Costanza worked on writing, audio mixing and producing Poundcake.

Credits adapted from AllMusic.

- Alaska Thunderfuck – vocals, composer
- Tomas Costanza – composer, mixing, producer
- Paul Coultrup – composer, producer
- Santiago Felipe – photography
- Ashley Levy – composer, producer
- Markaholic – engineer, mixing, producer
- Jeremy Mark Mikush – composer
- Matt Trivigno – engineer

== Charts ==
Weekly chart performance for Poundcake
Chart (2016)	Peak position
Belgian Albums (Ultratop Flanders)	200
UK Independent Albums Breakers (OCC)	10
US Heatseekers Albums (Billboard)	3
US Independent Albums (Billboard)	28
US Top Dance Albums (Billboard)	4
