= Amethyst Journey =

Studio album by Alaska and Jeremy
- Released: August 17, 2018
- Genre: Folk
- Label: Producer Entertainment Group

Alaska Thunderfuck chronology
Poundcake (2016)	Amethyst Journey (2018)	Vagina (2019)

Amethyst Journey is the debut studio album by Alaska and Jeremy, a musical duo featuring Alaska Thunderfuck and Jeremy Mikush, released by Producer Entertainment Group on August 17, 2018.

== Promotion ==
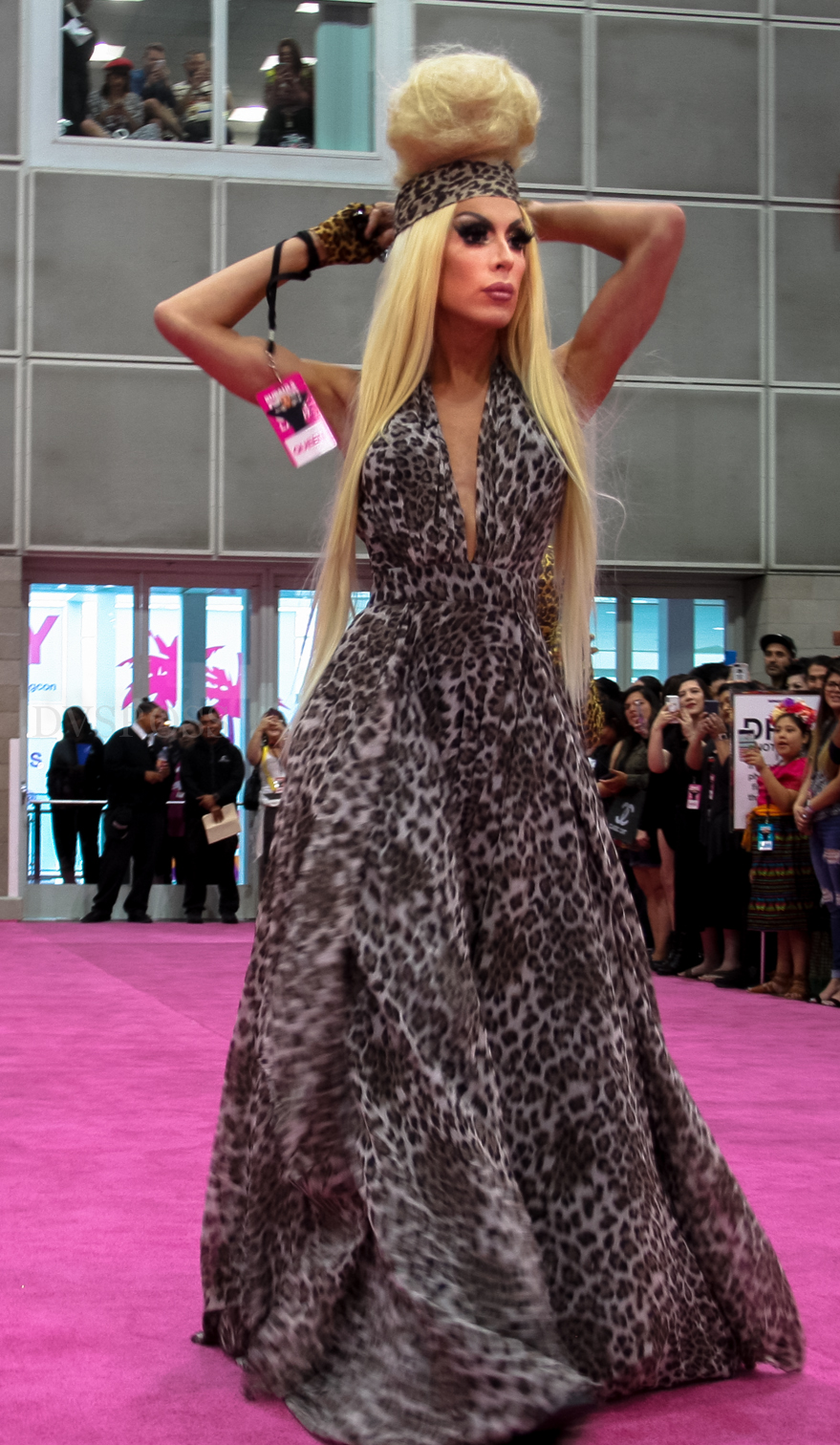
Alaska Thunderfuck, 2019

The album's lead single, "Aliens", was also released on August 17, 2018. The song's music video features Alaska in a field surrounded by cows, and the duo putting an alien into drag.

== Reception ==
The album has been described as "genderqueer hippie" and "folk music-based lullaby written for the people of earth". The Villager's Victor O. described the album as "a fresh, contemplative, and emotionally intelligent work that represents a change of tone in the dynamic duo's ever-evolving artistic voice", and Them. called Amethyst Journey "mellow".

== Track listing ==
1. "Aliens" – 3:59
2. "Truth in the Light" – 3:21
3. "So Far Gone" – 5:01
4. "The Wind" – 1:12
5. "Son of a Mother" – 3:31
6. "The End of the World" – 2:54
7. "Ascension" – 3:20
8. "At the End of the Day" – 1:37
