= Alaska Thunderfuck =

American drag performer and recording artist

Alaska Thunderfuck 5000
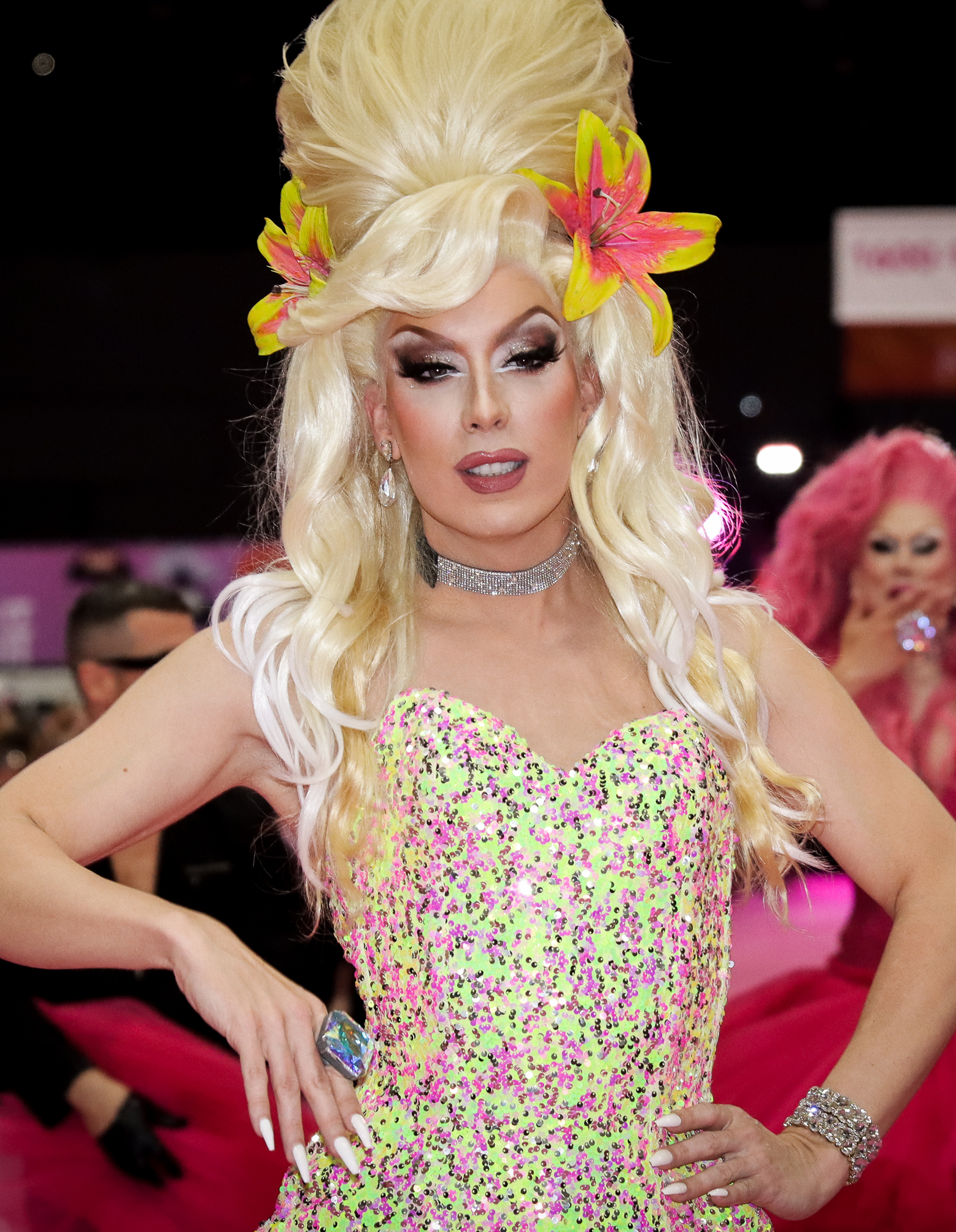
- Alaska at RuPaul's DragCon LA in 2024
- Born: Justin Andrew Honard; March 6, 1985 (age 41); Erie, Pennsylvania, U.S.
- Other names: Alaska; Alaska 5000
- Education: University of Pittsburgh (BA)
- Occupations: Drag queen; recording artist
- Years active: 2006–present
- Television: RuPaul's Drag Race (season 5); RuPaul's Drag Race All Stars (season 2)
- Partner: Matthew Herrmann (engaged)
- Musical career
- Origin: Erie, Pennsylvania, U.S.
- Genres: Dance; pop; R&B; rap
- Instrument: Vocals
- Labels: Producer Entertainment Group; Sidecar
- Member of: The AAA Girls
- Website: alaskathunderfuck.com

Justin Andrew Honard (born March 6, 1985), best known by the stage name Alaska Thunderfuck 5000 or Alaska Thunderfuck and mononymously as Alaska, is an American drag queen and singer from Erie, Pennsylvania. He is best known as a runner-up on the fifth season of RuPaul's Drag Race and the winner of the second season of RuPaul's Drag Race All Stars.

Her first studio album, Anus, was released in 2015, followed by her second album, Poundcake, in 2016 and her third album, Vagina, in 2019. Her fourth album, Red 4 Filth, was released in 2022 and The Brunette Album, her fifth, was released in September 2026. Alaska is also a part of The AAA Girls, a drag group with Willam and Courtney Act and hosts the podcast Race Chaser with Willam.

== Early life ==
Honard was born to Andrew and Pam Honard, and raised in Erie, Pennsylvania. He is partially of French Canadian descent, with his grandmother being French Canadian and originally from New Brunswick before immigrating to the United States. He graduated from Fort LeBoeuf High School in 2003. Honard has a brother, Cory. He studied theater at the University of Pittsburgh.

== Career ==
=== 2007–2012: Career beginnings ===
After dabbling in various jobs and projects in Pittsburgh, Honard eventually moved to Los Angeles to pursue acting. After discovering that he disliked trying to land acting jobs, he conceived the concept and personality of her drag persona while smoking marijuana. Honard had previously done drag as a hobby, but the conception of "Alaska" fueled an intent to turn it into a career, and she eventually landed a job at the West Hollywood club Fubar. Honard frequently performed as Alaska in the Trannyshack shows in Los Angeles. In 2009, she performed in Palm Springs Gay Pride with Tammie Brown and Jer Ber Jones.

Alaska met future boyfriend Sharon Needles (stage name of Aaron Coady) through Myspace via an introduction from Pittsburgh drag queen Veruca la'Piranha in December 2009, and eventually moved back to Pittsburgh, Pennsylvania, to live with him in 2010. She has said that she found Sharon Needles "fascinating", and, even after their breakup, "still does". Along with Sharon Needles and Cherri Baum, she formed the band Haus of Haunt, which later evolved into a drag troupe based out of Pittsburgh bar The Blue Moon. As part of the Haus of Haunt, she helped present the Pittsburgh debut of fellow drag queen and recording artist Christeene Vale in 2013. Alaska later impersonated Vale for the music video "RuPaulogize" by Willam Belli. The couple had friction between them after Sharon Needles' casting on season four of Drag Race, as Alaska had auditioned for every season of the show previous, and Sharon Needles had been cast on her first attempt at auditioning. Sharon Needles later went on to win the season in April 2012, beating fellow finalists Chad Michaels and Phi Phi O'Hara.

=== 2013–2015: RuPaul's Drag Race and Anus ===
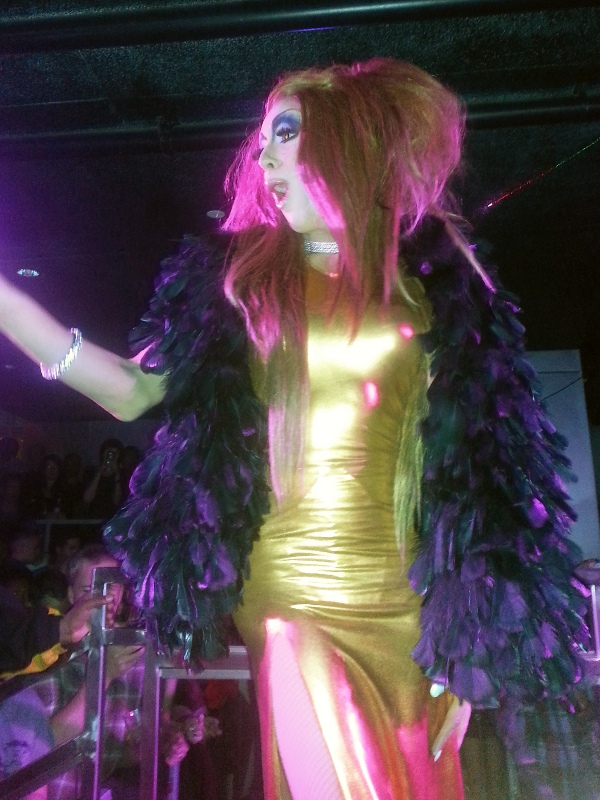
Alaska Thunderfuck in 2013

Alaska competed on the fifth season of RuPaul's Drag Race, under the mononym Alaska instead of her full drag name Alaska Thunderfuck. She had previously auditioned for every season of the show, and filmed her audition tape for the fifth season while on a cruise paid for by Sharon Needles' Drag Race winnings. She prepared for the season with the help of Baum, la'Piranha, and New York City-based drag queen Miles De Niro. Sharon Needles was not present for the preparation, as she was touring at the time. Alaska won the fragrance commercial-themed main challenge in the episode "Scent of a Drag Queen" and the main challenge for "Sugar Ball". As part of the show, Alaska sang on the "We Are the World"-inspired song "Can I Get an Amen?". The song's proceeds helped benefit the Los Angeles Gay and Lesbian Center. At the season finale in May 2013, Alaska was declared the runner-up along with fellow competitor Roxxxy Andrews. Jinkx Monsoon was the winner of the season. Due to her substantial gain in wealth after Drag Race and subsequent ability to purchase the item, she later fell into a cocaine addiction, which Alaska has described as "kinda ugly, gross, and kinda sad".

In October 2013, Alaska performed as Dr. Frank N. Furter in Woodlawn Theatre's production of The Rocky Horror Show in San Antonio, Texas. RuPaul's Drag Race judge Michelle Visage and season four contestant Willam Belli also starred in the musical.

Since appearing on RuPaul's Drag Race, Alaska has toured and performed, appearing in RuPaul's Drag Race Battle of the Seasons shows, the Drag Stars at Sea cruises, custom one-woman shows such as a Stevie Nicks tribute called "Stevie Forever", a cabaret show called "Red for Filth", and a holiday show called "Blue Christmas". An animated version of Alaska appeared in the "RuPaul's Drag Race: Dragopolis 2.0" mobile app. During the summer of 2014, she starred in a stage production of Sex and the City. With her brother, Cory Binney, Alaska appeared in a web series sponsored by World of Wonder, called Bro'Laska. In 2014, Alaska became a spokesmodel for American Apparel alongside Willam Belli and Courtney Act.

Alaska has since released a string of singles, namely "Ru Girl", "Your Makeup Is Terrible", and "Nails". In June 2015, Alaska's debut album, Anus, was released to positive reviews. Singles from the album included "Hieeee" and "This Is My Hair".

=== 2016–2017: RuPaul's Drag Race All Stars and Poundcake ===
In 2016, Alaska returned to Drag Race for the second season of RuPaul's Drag Race All Stars. She won 4 challenges (Snatch Game, Acting, Stand Up, Advert) and was in the bottom for a makeover challenge. She received backlash due to her choices of eliminations and her behavior toward the end of the competition. In response, Alaska donated $5,000 to the charity Trans Kids Purple Rainbow and posted an apology video online. In the final five of the competition, when she landed in the bottom, Alaska famously offered competitor Detox $10,000 to vote for her to stay in the competition, of which Alaska revealed years later that she donated the amount to a snake sanctuary instead. In the season finale, she was crowned the second winner of All Stars. Due to the stress sustained while filming the season, she has said that she preferred the experience she had while filming Season 5 of Drag Race over All Stars 2.

In the same year, Alaska released her second album Poundcake, named after the rebellious puppet Lil' Poundcake, who was created from a mannequin doll by Alaska and fellow contestant Lineysha Sparx during the mini-challenge in the third episode of the fifth season of RuPaul's Drag Race. Three singles from the album have been released: "The T", "Stun", and "Puppet". On the seventh episode of the eighth season of RuPaul's Drag Race All Stars, the main challenge of the episode was for the contestants to act in a true crime spoof entitled "Forensic Queens: Wha-Ha-Happened to Lil' Poundcake?", depicting a fictional All Stars season where Lil' Poundcake, slated to make her Drag Race comeback, suddenly disappears.

Alaska competed in the first season of VH1's Scared Famous, which premiered on October 23, 2017, and placed 6th in the competition.

=== 2018–2020: Race Chaser, Vagina, and pageant ===
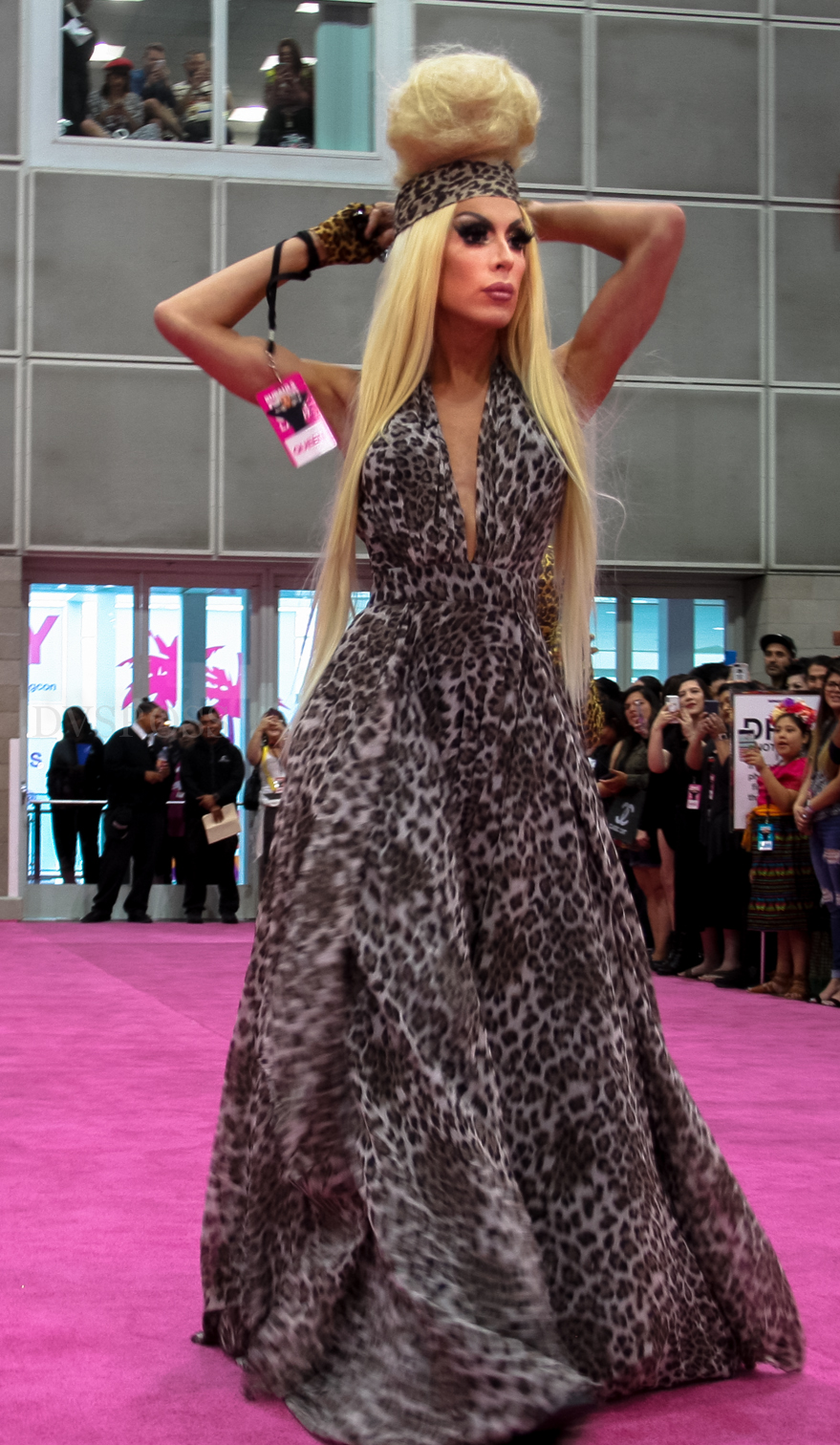
Alaska at RuPaul's DragCon LA, 2019

Since 2018, Alaska has hosted the podcast Race Chaser with fellow Drag Race alumna Willam Belli. The podcast is "devoted to the discussion and dissection of every episode" of RuPaul's Drag Race. Alaska and Jeremy Mikush, performing as Alaska and Jeremy, released their debut album Amethyst Journey in 2018.

In 2019, Alaska released her third album titled Vagina. Soon after, she created and hosted The Drag Queen of the Year Pageant Competition Award Contest Competition at the Montalban Theater in Hollywood. The event was sold-out and featured eight different drag artists competing for the crown. The eventual winner, decided by Alaska and a panel of judges including Peppermint, Sharon Needles, and Willam, was Abhora, a former contestant on season two of The Boulet Brothers' Dragula. The event has since been hosted annually (Note: The competition was seemingly not hosted in 2020 as a result of the COVID-19 pandemic.) by Alaska alongside Lola LeCroix, with a documentary series following the production of the 2022 edition, Behind the Drag Queen of the Year Pageant Competition Award Contest Competition, being released in 2023. In June 2023, a panel of judges from New York magazine placed Alaska seventh on their list of "the most powerful drag queens in America", a ranking of 100 former Drag Race contestants.

=== 2021–2025: Red 4 Filth and Drag The Musical ===
Alaska's first comedy special, The Alaska Thunderfuck Extra Special Comedy Special, aired on OutTV in Canada in 2021.

She released her memoir, My Name's Yours, What's Alaska?: A Memoir on November 9, 2021.

In May 2022, Alaska released a concept album for Drag: The Musical, which she co-wrote with Tomas Costanza and Ash Gordon. A staged version ran from September to October at the Bourbon Room in Los Angeles, starring Alaska as the character Kitty. Alaska reprised the role when the show debuted Off-Broadway in October 2024, with the role of Kitty eventually taken over by fellow drag queen Jimbo before the show ended its run on April 27, 2025.

Alaska released her fourth studio album, Red 4 Filth, on September 23, 2022. Written during COVID-19 lockdowns, the album was inspired by the music of the 1990s and 2000s, with Alaska citing Aqua, Toni Braxton, Britney Spears and Weezer as specific influences. The album includes appearances by Stephanie's Child and Ts Madison, as well as a cover of Ace of Base's "All That She Wants".

In June 2023, Alaska took up the role of Princess in the Dungeons & Dragons themed show Dungeons and Drag Queens, which was also the 18th season of the actual play anthology series Dimension 20 on Dropout. In 2025, she reprised the role in the show's second season.

=== 2025 - Current: Oh, Mary! National Tour and The Brunette Album ===
Beginning September 19, Alaska will star as Mary Todd Lincoln in the National Tour of Cole Escola's acclaimed Broadway hit "Oh, Mary!", running through January 17, 2027.

Alaska released her fifth studio album, The Brunette Album, on September 11, 2026.

== Public image and artistry ==
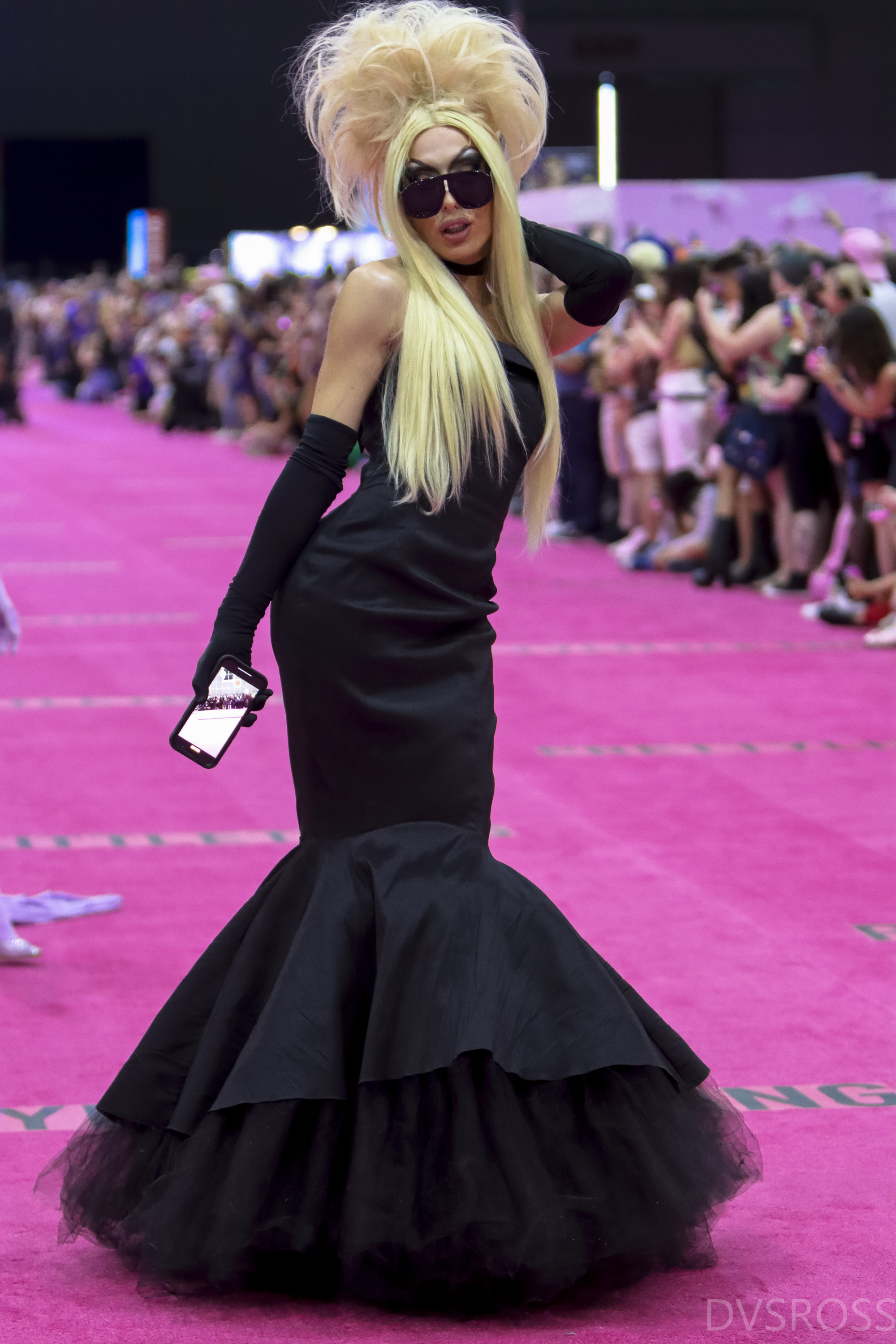
Alaska at RuPaul's DragCon LA in 2022

Alaska's drag name is derived from Alaskan Thunderfuck, a strain of cannabis.

She has stated, "I am a huge fan of drag for many reasons; first and foremost being that it is an extremely important form of performance art. Drag uses humor as means of relaying a message, and because humor tends to get overlooked as a valid way to communicate through art, drag tends to get pigeonholed into being something 'less than' when you think about it in terms what you'd see at a museum. I can't think of almost anything more artistically redeeming than a huge museum full of drag queens, but maybe that's just me."

She has cited Gianni Versace, Lady Gaga and Marc Jacobs as her favorite fashion influences. Thought Catalog described her style as "risk-taking" and "creative", with "weird choices"; Yahoo! called her Lil Poundcake outfit a "pink nightmare" and "clownish crazy", and explained that "the drag and music world would certainly be very quiet without Ms Thunderfuck".

Alaska counts Divine and Marilyn Monroe as her role models.

== Personal life ==
Alaska was in a relationship with fellow drag queen Sharon Needles for four years before separating in November 2013. She has stated that the pair had a physical fight after a night of doing cocaine. Alaska has said that they are now "really good friends." Sharon Needles appeared in Alaska's music video for "Hieee" in 2015, two years after their breakup.

In June 2022, Honard's father was killed in a motorcycle crash. Honard wrote on social media that his father was "kind and loving and hilarious and had a beautiful heart, and had so much love for his family, his wife, my sister and me, and his grandchildren". He also wrote that he was "feeling a lot of pain and grief right now. I'm also feeling compassion for anyone who has ever lost someone they love".

In August 2025, Alaska announced that her longtime partner Matthew Herrmann proposed to her in her hometown of Erie, Pennsylvania after her grandmother's 90th birthday celebration.

== Discography ==
Alaska Thunderfuck discography
- Studio albums: 5
- Singles: 29
- Collaborative albums: 2

=== Studio albums ===
Title	Details	Peak chart positions				
Title	Details	US Heat	US Indie	US Dance	US Comedy	BEL (FL)
Anus	Released: June 23, 2015; Label: Sidecar, PEG; Format: CD, LP, digital download	4	14	3	—	—
Poundcake	Released: October 14, 2016; Label: PEG; Format: CD, digital download	3	28	4	—	200
Vagina	Released: May 24, 2019; Label: PEG; Format: Digital download	—	—	—	2	—
Red 4 Filth	Released: September 23, 2022; Formats: Digital download, streaming, CD, vinyl record	—	—	—	—	—
The Brunette Album	Released: September 11, 2026; Label: PEG; Formats: Digital download, streaming					

=== Collaborative studio albums ===
Title	Details	Peak chart positions
Title	Details	US Cast
Amethyst Journey (with Jeremy Mikush as Alaska and Jeremy)	Released: August 17, 2018; Label: PEG; Formats: CD, digital download	—
Drag: The Musical (The Studio Cast Recording)	Released: May 13, 2022; Label: PEG, Killingsworth, Craft, Concord Theatricals; Formats: Digital download	12

=== Singles ===
==== As lead artist ====
Title	Year	Peak chart positions	Album
Title	Year	US Comedy Digital	Album
"Ru Girl"	2013	—	Non-album single
"Your Makeup Is Terrible"	2014	—	Anus
"Nails"	2014	—	Anus
"Hieeee"	2015	5	Anus
"This Is My Hair"	2015	—	Anus
"Anus"	2016	—	Anus
"Puppet"	2016	—	Poundcake
"The T" (featuring Adore Delano)	2016	—	Poundcake
"Come to Brazil"	2017	—	Poundcake
"Snaked"	2018	—	Vagina
"Valentina"	2018	—	Non-album single
"Leopard Print"	2020	—	Vagina
"Sitting Alone in the VIP" (featuring Kandy Muse)	2020	—	Non-album singles
"Pool Party"	2020	—	Non-album singles
"Let It Snow" (Ivan and Peter Mix)	2020	—	Non-album singles
"ROY G BIV BBT"	2021	—	Non-album singles
"Red"	2021	—	Red 4 Filth
"Beautiful Night (4 A) Breakdown"	2021	—	Red 4 Filth
"Without Your Love"	2021	—	Red 4 Filth
"Wow"	2021	—	Red 4 Filth
"XOXOY2K"	2021	—	Red 4 Filth
"Ask Me"	2021	—	Red 4 Filth
"22"	2021	—	Red 4 Filth
"Uh"	2022	—	Red 4 Filth
"I Am Her (She Is Me)" (featuring Ts Madison)	2022	—	Red 4 Filth
"Girlz Night" (featuring Stephanie's Child)	2022	—	Red 4 Filth
"Revolution"	2026		The Brunette Album
"Brunette"	2026		The Brunette Album
"I Fucking Love You"	2026		The Brunette Album

==== As featured artist ====
Title	Year	Peak chart positions		Album
Title	Year	US Comedy Digital	US Dance	Album
"Let's Get Something Started" (Candy Apple Blue featuring Alaska Thunderfuck)	2013	—	—	Night Tracks
"Can I Get an Amen?" (RuPaul featuring Drag Race Season 5 Cast)	2013	—	—	Non-album single
"I Look Fuckin' Cool" (Adore Delano featuring Alaska Thunderfuck)	2014	—	—	Till Death Do Us Party
"Ride for AIDS" (Willam featuring Alaska Thunderfuck)	2015	12	—	Shartistry in Motion
"Read U Wrote U" (RuPaul featuring Alaska Thunderfuck, Detox, Katya & Roxxxy Andrews)	2016	—	29	Non-album singles
"Yet Another Dig" (Bob the Drag Queen featuring Alaska Thunderfuck)	2017	—	—	Non-album singles
"Shade" (Cake Moss featuring Alaska)	2018	—	—	Non-album singles
"La China Mas Latina" (Gia Gunn featuring Alaska Thunderfuck)	2018	—	—	Non-album singles
"Come in Brazil" (Katya featuring Alaska Thunderfuck)	2020	—	—	Vampire Fitness
"Gay Hands Up" (Jan featuring Alaska Thunderfuck and Peppermint)	2021	—	—	Non-album single
"Everyone Is a Little Bit Gay" (Ash Gordon featuring Alaska Thunderfuck)	2022	—	—	Ash Gordon II
"It's in the Book" (Trinity the Tuck featuring Alaska Thunderfuck)	2023	—	—	Trinity Ruins Christmas: The Musical
"Eternity to Me" (Trinity the Tuck featuring Alaska Thunderfuck)	2023	—	—	Trinity Ruins Christmas: The Musical
"Good Enough" (Trinity the Tuck featuring Alaska Thunderfuck)	2023	—	—	Trinity Ruins Christmas: The Musical
"—" denotes a recording that failed to chart or was not released in that territory.

=== Other appearances ===
Title	Year	Other artist(s)	Album
"Kai Kai"	2013	Sharon Needles, Ana Matronic	PG-13
"Miss Fame"	2015	Miss Fame	Beauty Marked
"Everyday Is Christmas"	2015	N/A	Christmas Queens
"Working Holiday"	2016	Manila Luzon	Christmas Queens 2
"Chr!$tm@s $ux!"	2016	N/A	Christmas Queens 2
"We Three Queens"	2017	Manila Luzon, Peppermint	Christmas Queens 3
"Angels We Have Heard on High"	2017	N/A	Christmas Queens 3
"All This Body"	2018	Jiggly Caliente, Ginger Minj	T.H.O.T. Process
"America's Sweetheart"	2018	Blair St. Clair	Call My Life
"Santa Baby"	2018	N/A	Christmas Queens 4
"Inspire Me (Reprise)"	2019	Manila Luzon	Rules!
"Where Are the Jokes?"	2019	Trinity The Tuck	Plastic
"Pool Party"	2020	Ivan & Peter, DJ Flula	Non-album single
"Come in Brazil"	2020	Katya	Vampire Fitness

== Tours ==
- Access All Areas Tour (2017)
- An Evening with Alaska (2018)
- Red 4 Filth (2022)
- It's Beginning to Look a Lot Alaska... A Christmas Show (2023)
- A Very Alaska Christmas (2025)
- The Revolution Tour (2027)

== Filmography ==
=== Film ===
Year	Title	Role	Director	Notes	Ref.
2015	TupiniQueens	Herself			
2017	The Drag That Said Phi	Herself	Felippe Moraes	Video Art	
2018	Hurricane Bianca 2: From Russia With Hate	Herself	Matt Kugelman	Cameo	
2018	The Last Sharknado: It's About Time	Morgana	Anthony C. Ferrante	Television film	
2018	The Quiet Room	Hattie	Sam Wineman	Short film	
2019	The Queens	Herself		Documentary	
2019	Ru's Angels	Herself		Short film	
2020	Circus of Books	Himself (out of drag)		Documentary	
2021	The Alaska Thunderf**k Extra Special Comedy Special	Herself		OUTtv original	
2022	God Save The Queens	Stevie	Jordan Danger		

=== Television ===
Year	Title	Role	Notes	Ref.
2011	RuPaul's Drag Race	Herself	Cameo; Season 3 – Episode 1: "Casting Extravaganza"	
2012	RuPaul's Drag Race: Untucked	Herself	Cameo; Season 4 (1 episode)	
2013	RuPaul's Drag Race	Herself	Contestant; Season 5 — Runner-up	
2013	RuPaul's Drag Race: Untucked	Herself	Season 5	
2015	The Art Of	Herself	Episode: "The Art of Drag"	
2015	RuPaul's Drag Race	Anna Wintour	Season 7 – Episode 1: "Born Naked"	
2016	RuPaul's Drag Race	Herself	Guest; Season 8 – Episode 10: "Grand Finale"	
2016	RuPaul's Drag Race All Stars	Herself	Contestant; Season 2 — Winner	
2017	The New Celebrity Apprentice	Herself	Episode: "Candy for a Billionaire"	
2017	@midnight	Herself	Episode 580	
2017	Scared Famous	Herself	Contestant; season 1 — 6th place	
2018	RuPaul's Drag Race All Stars	Herself	Cameo; Season 3	
2019	RuPaul's Drag Race All Stars	Herself	Cameo; Season 4	
2019	The Bachelorette	Herself	Cameo; season 15	
2020	Watch What Happens Live with Andy Cohen	Herself	Guest; season 17, episode 43	
2020	Cooked with Cannabis	Herself	Guest	
2021	The Sherry Vine Show	Herself	Guest star; Episode: "Alaska Thunderfuck"	
2022	Queer for Fear: The History of Queer Horror	Herself	Guest star; season 1 (4 episodes)	
2022	The Boulet Brothers' Dragula: Titans	Herself	Guest judge; episode 3	
2023	Drag Me to Dinner	Herself	Hulu original reality series	
2023	Hell's Kitchen	Herself	Guest diner; Episode: "Citizens of Hell's Kitchen"	
2024	Drag Den season 2	Herself	Guess Judge; Episode 3	

=== Web series ===
Year	Title	Role	Notes	Ref.
2013	Pure Camp	Herself	Produced by World of Wonder	
2013	Ring My Bell	Herself	Produced by World of Wonder	
2014-2017	Hey Qween!	Herself	Guest; 2 episodes	
2014–2020	Bro'Laska	Herself	Co-host; produced by World of Wonder	
2014	Transformations	Herself	Guest; produced by World of Wonder	
2015	Raja Drawja	Herself	Episode: "Alaska 5000"; produced by World of Wonder	
2015	Alyssa's Secret	Herself	Episode: "Alaska Edwards"; produced by World of Wonder	
2016–2019	Fashion Photo RuView	Herself	Recurring guest host; produced by World of Wonder	
2016	How to Makeup	Herself	Episode: "Alaska Thunderfuck – Day to Night"	
2017	Shane and Friends	Herself	Season 5 – episode 27	
2017	The Boulet Brothers' Dragula	Herself	Guest judge; season 2, episode 4	
2017	Cosmo Queens	Herself	Produced by Cosmpolitan	
2017	101 India	Herself	Episode: "A Drag Queen Sandwich With Alaska Thunderf**k and Rani Ko-He-Nur"	
2018	Detox's Life Rehab	Herself	Episode: "Hair, Dating & Pups"	
2018	The Pit Stop	Herself	Host (Drag Race All Stars 3); produced by VH1	
2018	Ass Controller	Alexis Thunderstorm	Episode 9. Produced by Men.com	
2020	ASMR Queens	Herself	Episode: "Alaska Thunderf*ck"	
2020	Hot Trash	Herself	Episode 6	
2020	Love for the Arts	Herself	Guest judge	
2021	What's My Game?	Herself	Episode: "Alaska vs. Brittany Broski"	
2023	The Pit Stop	Herself	All Stars Season 8, Episode 1	
2023	Dirty Laundry	Herself	Episode: "Who Came Out to Their High School Girlfriend Via Jesus Christ?"	
2023, 2025	Dimension 20: Dungeons and Drag Queens	Princess	Main role; 10 episodes	
2024	Monét's Slumber Party	Herself	Guest	

=== Theatre ===
Year	Title	Role	Theatre	Ref.
2013	The Rocky Horror Show	Dr. Frank N. Furter	Woodlawn Theatre	
2021	Head over Heels	Queen Gynecia	Pasadena Playhouse	
2022-24	Drag: The Musical	Kitty Galloway	Bourbon Room, Los Angeles; New World Stages	
2026	Oh, Mary!	Mary Todd Lincoln	US National Tour	

=== Music videos ===
Year	Title	Artist(s)	Ref.
2013	"RuPaulogize"	Willam Belli	
2014	"Your Makeup Is Terrible"	Herself	
2014	"Nails"	Herself	
2014	"Ransom"	MOXXI	
2015	"Do It Like Miley"	Team Heartbreak	
2015	"Hieeee"	Herself	
2015	"This Is My Hair"	Herself	
2016	"Expensive"	Todrick Hall	
2016	"Gimme All Your Money"	Herself feat. Laganja Estranja	
2016	"Anus"	Herself	
2016	"Puppet"	Herself	
2016	"The T"	Herself feat. Adore Delano	
2017	"Power"	Little Mix feat. Stormzy	
2017	"Stun"	Herself feat. Gia Gunn	
2017	"Come to Brazil"	Herself	
2017	"Valentina"	Herself	
2018	"666"	Sharon Needles	
2018	"Oops I Think I Pooped"	Pandora Boxx	
2018	"Aliens"	Alaska & Jeremy	
2018	"Jolene"	Dolly Parton	
2019	"Truth in the Light"	Alaska & Jeremy	
2019	"Monster Mash"	Sharon Needles	
2020	"Leopard Print"	Herself	
2020	"Sitting Alone in The VIP"	Herself	
2020	"Shooting Star – A Revealing New Musical's COVID-19 Relief Fundraising Medley"	The cast of Shooting Star – A Revealing New Musical	
2021	"ROY G BIV BBT"	Herself	
2021	"Gay Hands Up"	Herself (with Jan Sport & Peppermint)	
2021	"Red"	Herself	
2021	"beautiful (night 4 a) breakdown"	Herself	
2021	"wow"	Herself	
2021	"XOXOY2K"	Herself	
2023	"True Colors"	Herself	

=== Podcasts ===
Year	Title	Role	Notes	Ref.
2014	RuPaul: What's the Tee?	Guest	Episode: "Perseverance & Oil Pulling with Alaska"	
2015–2017	The Pandora Boxx Show	Guest	3 episodes	
2016–2023	Out on the Lanai: A Golden Girls Podcast	Guest	17 episodes	
2018, 2021	You're Making It Worse	Guest	2 episodes	
2018	Whimsically Volatile	Guest	Episode: "Alaska!"	
2018–present	Race Chaser	Co-host	With Willam	
2018	Las Culturistas	Guest	Episode: "God's Plan"	
2019	Dopey: On the Dark Comedy of Drug Addiction	Guest	Episode: "Alaska Thunderfuck & Aurora on weed, relapse and other dumb shit"	
2020	A Faerily Queer Podcast	Guest	Episode: "Alaska!"	
2020	Doing Great with Vicky Vox	Guest	Episode: "Queen of Clurbs"	
2020	Ghosted! by Roz Hernandez	Guest	Episode: "Alaska Thunderfuck and Jackie Beat"	
2020–2021	The Chop with Latrice Royale & Manila Luzon	Guest	5 episodes; also executive producer	
2020	Sibling Rivalry	Guest	Episode: "The One with Willam & Alaska"	
2020	Sloppy Seconds with Big Dipper & Meatball	Guest	Episode: "Constant Ambient Sexual Energy"; also executive producer	
2020	Not Too Deep with Grace Helbig	Guest	Episode: "Alaska Thunderfuck 5000 - New Year's Queens"	
2021	The Bald and the Beautiful with Trixie Mattel and Katya Zamo	Guest	Episode: "Alexis Thunderstorm 500 with Alaska Thunderf*ck"	
2021	Why Won't You Date Me? with Nicole Byer	Guest	Episode: "How to Manifest your Dream Man"	
2021	Queery with Cameron Esposito	Guest	Episode: "Alaska Thunderfuck"	
2021	Lady to Lady	Guest	Episode: "It's Okay to Quit"	
2021	Scam Goddess	Guest	Episode: "The Poisonous Beauty Product Peddler with Alaska Thunderfuck"	
2021	Spanish Aquí Presents	Guest	Episode: "I Need Musical Numbers"	
2021	Kesha and the Creepies	Guest	Episode: "Trash to Treasure with Alaska Thunderfuck 5000"	
2022	Wanna Be On Top? with Shea Couleé	Guest	Episode: "Cycle 7: Makeover Day"; also executive producer	
2022-2023	Hall & Closet	Guest	2 episodes; also executive producer	
2022	Very Delta	Guest	Episode: "Are You Pre-Sweetened Like Me?"; also executive producer	
2023	Sissy That Talk Show	Guest	Episode: "Season Finale: Alaska Thunderfuck"; also executive producer	

== Awards and nominations ==
=== Queerty Awards ===
Year	Category	Work	Results	Ref.
2019	Podcast	Race Chaser	Won	
2020	Podcast	Race Chaser	Won	
2021	Podcast	Race Chaser	Runner-up	
2022	Podcast	Race Chaser	Won	
2022	Drag Royalty	Herself	Nominated	
2022	Indie Music Video	"Gay Hands Up"	Runner-up	
2022	Standout Stand-Up	Herself	Nominated	
2023	Documentary	Access All Areas: The AAA Girls Tour	Won	
2023	Drag Royalty	Herself	Runner-up	
2023	Live Theatre	Drag: The Musical	Won	
2024	Podcast	Race Chaser	Won	
2025	Web Series	Dungeons and Drag Queens	Won	

=== Miscellaneous awards ===
Year	Award-giving body	Category	Work	Results	Ref.
2020	Webby Awards	Race Chaser	Podcasts - Television & Film	Honored	
2025	GLAAD Media Awards	Drag: The Musical	Special recognition	Honored	
2025	Lucille Lortel Awards	Drag: The Musical	Outstanding Musical	Nominated	
2025	Lucille Lortel Awards	Drag: The Musical	Outstanding Lead Performer in a Musical	Nominated	
2025	Drama League Award	Drag: The Musical	Distinguished Performance	Nominated	
2025	Outer Critics Circle Awards	Drag: The Musical	Outstanding Lead Performer in an Off-Broadway Musical	Nominated	
2025	Dorian Awards	Drag: The Musical	Outstanding Lead Performance in an Off-Broadway Production	Nominated	

== Notes ==
Preceded by Chad Michaels	Winner of RuPaul's Drag Race All Stars; US All Stars 2	Succeeded by Trixie Mattel
