= Laganja Estranja =

American drag queen

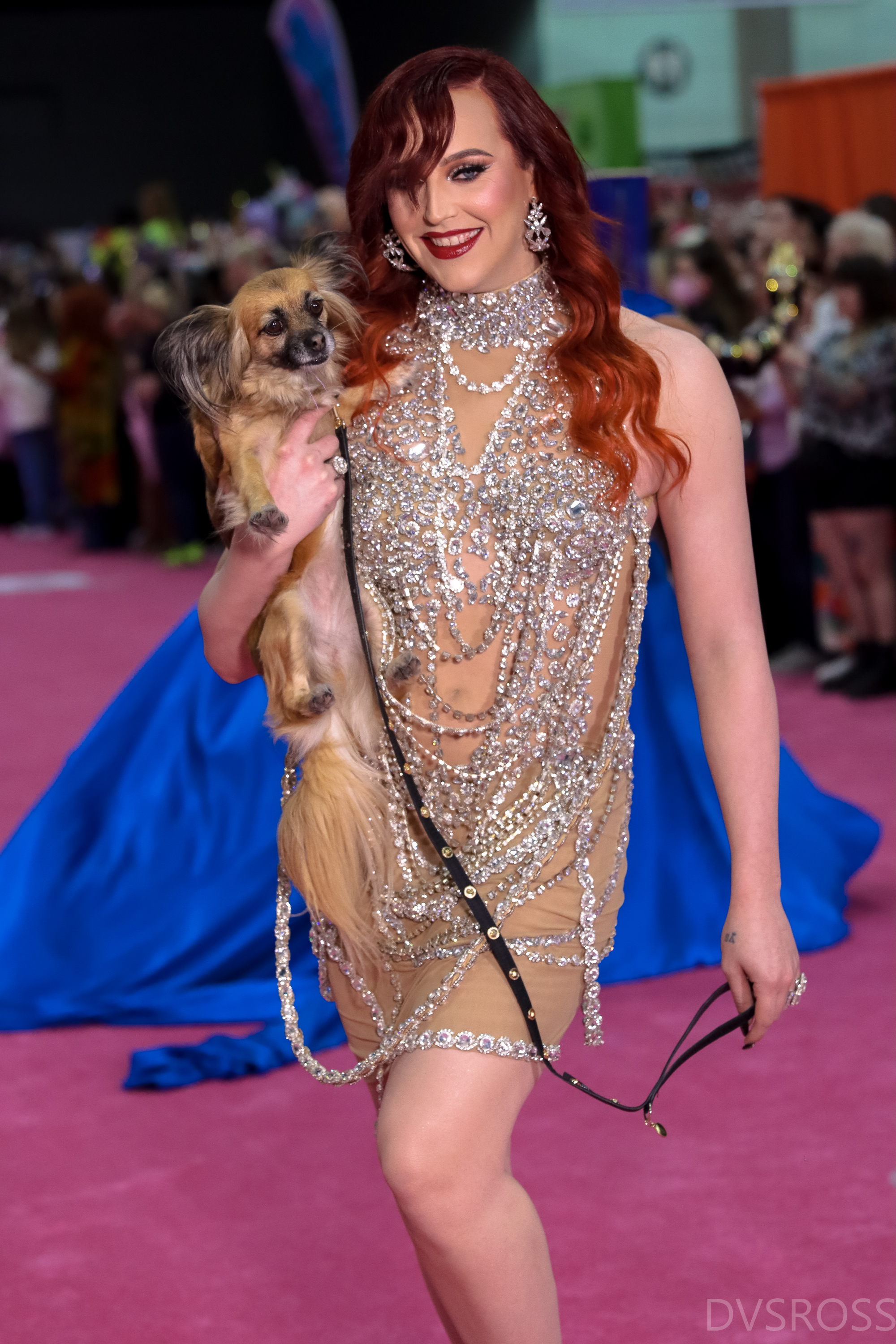
- Laganja Estranja at RuPaul's DragCon LA, 2023
- Born: Jay Evan Jackson; December 28, 1988 (age 37); Dallas, Texas, U.S.
- Education: California Institute of the Arts (BFA)
- Occupations: Drag queen; choreographer; activist; fashion designer; rapper
- Website: laganjaestranja.com

Jay Evan Jackson, known professionally as Laganja Estranja (born December 28, 1988), is an American choreographer and drag queen based in Los Angeles. Laganja competed on the sixth season of RuPaul's Drag Race, finishing in eighth place. She came out as transgender in 2021.

== Early life ==
Laganja was born to Nancy Lynn Ferrin Jackson and David Michael Jackson, was raised in Dallas, Texas, and attended the Booker T. Washington High School for the Performing and Visual Arts. Both of her parents worked as high school guidance counselors for over 30 years. She obtained a BFA in dance from the California Institute of the Arts.

== Career ==
=== Drag ===
Laganja Estranja's drag debut was at California Institute of the Arts (CalArts) production of "Cal Arts is Burning" in 2010, opening the door to what is now her persona. Then at Micky's West Hollywood on November 7, 2011. After winning the Amateur Competition, Laganja became an official "Showgirl" with a monthly gig at Micky's. Laganja went on to win "Queen of Queens" at 340 Nightclub in Pomona, CA and "Best Newcomer" in West Hollywood.

In April 2013, Laganja Estranja auditioned for RuPaul's Drag Race. She was accepted in the show, and filmed in the summer of 2013. In 2014, the sixth season of drag-oriented reality competition RuPaul's Drag Race aired on LogoTV. Laganja performed moderately well on the show, winning a challenge when she was partnered with the eventual runner-up, Adore Delano. Laganja was eliminated in the eighth episode of the season, placing her in a small category of contestants in the show's history who were eliminated the week after winning a challenge. At the outset of the show, Laganja received quite a lot of attention on social media for her entrance. During the show, Laganja became infamous for her over-the-top dramatics, catchphrases, and emotional breakdowns. Eventual winner Bianca Del Rio credited Laganja as the root of every memorable quote from the following season of RuPaul's Drag Race. Laganja's mannerisms have since been parodied by fellow drag queens, including Alaska Thunderfuck.

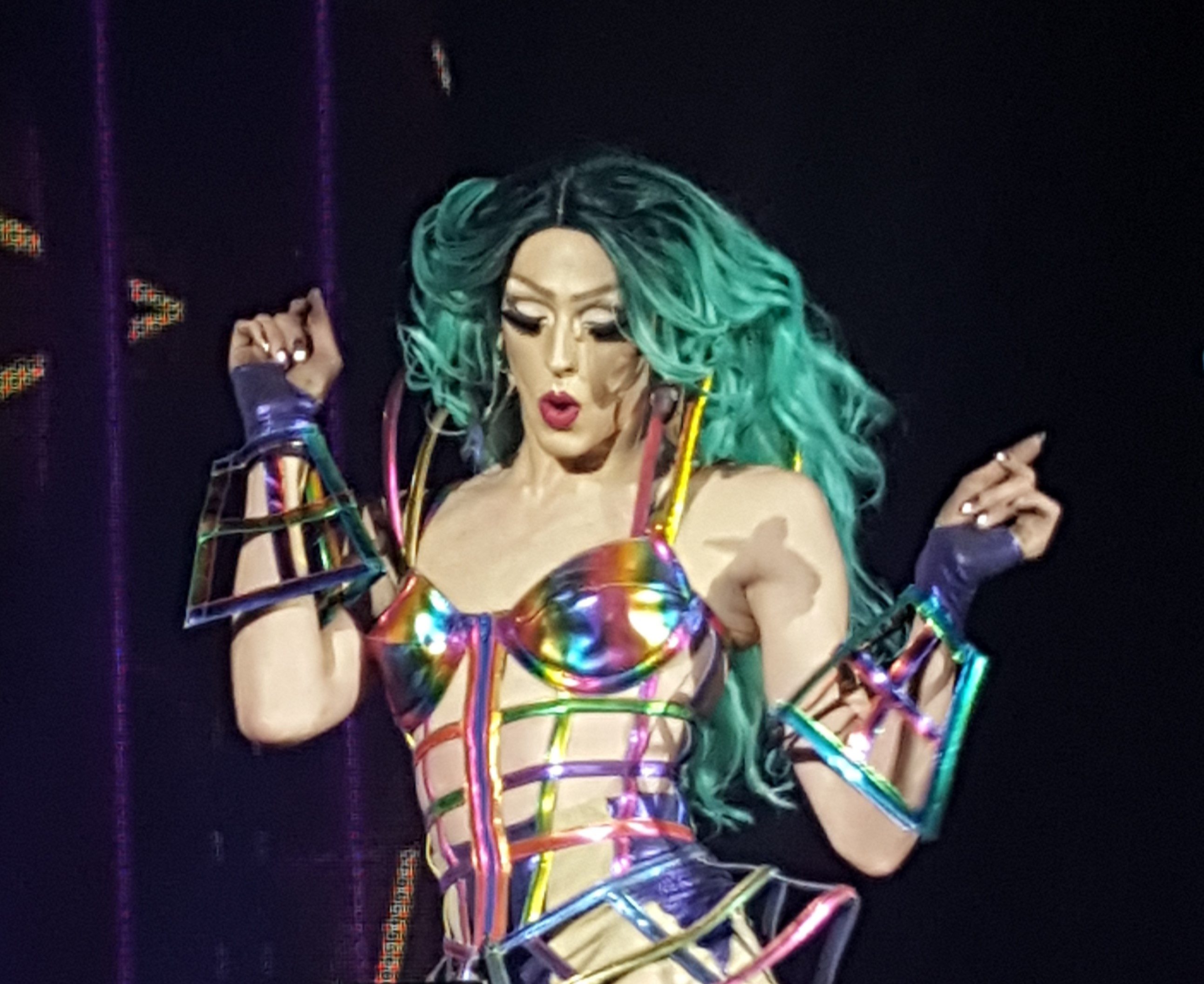
Laganja Estranja in 2016

Laganja Estranja is the drag daughter of Alyssa Edwards, and the drag sister of Shangela and Plastique Tiara —all of whom competed on RuPaul's Drag Race, Edwards appearing on season 5 and season 2 of RuPaul's Drag Race: All Stars, Shangela appearing on season 2 and 3 and All Stars season 3, and Tiara on season 11 and All Stars season 9. Under the moniker of the Haus of Edwards, they have internationally toured and performed together on multiple occasions, most notably at the pre-show warm-up for the finale episode of the seventh season of RuPaul's Drag Race. Laganja currently hosts her own web show on the drag-centric platform World of Wonder, the same production company behind RuPaul's Drag Race, RuPaul's DragCon LA, and RuPaul's DragCon NYC.

Laganja appeared as a Lip-Sync Assassin in the third episode of RuPaul's Drag Race All Stars Season 6, winning the lip-sync against fellow season 6 contestant, Trinity K. Bonet. She was a featured performer during Jennifer Lopez's performance at the 2022 iHeartRadio Music Awards.

=== Music ===
In 2014, Laganja contributed vocals to a cover of RuPaul's "Jealous of My Boogie", for the album RuPaul Presents: The CoverGurlz. Throughout 2014, Laganja was featured on three singles, contributing a rap verse to each song. In 2015, she released her debut single as a lead artist, titled "Legs", which featured American rapper Rye Rye. In June 2015, "Legs" was rated as the third best song by a RuPaul's Drag Race contestant by Pitchfork Media. In June 2015, Laganja was featured on fellow RuPaul's Drag Race star, Alaska Thunderfuck's debut album, Anus, on the track "Gimme All Your Money".

In 2016, she released both her third single "Tease 4U" and a Christmas Album with the Haus of Edwards. Her single on the album is entitled "Green XXXmas," and the video featured exotic dancer Candace Cane. In September 2018, she released her fourth single "Look At Me" featuring J. Tyler, and an accompanying video. The video took a stance against arrests for marijuana possession. In November 2018, she released a lyric video for her fifth single "Smoke Break".

=== Cannabis advocacy ===
As a cannabis rights activist, Laganja has hosted conversations on cannabis legalization at Trinity College in Dublin, Ireland, and at Impulse in San Francisco. She has also been featured in High Times magazine and on the cover of Dope Magazine. In 2014, Laganja launched a collection of marijuana-themed merchandise including a jewelry line named Laganja Estranja Is My Enemy. Laganja has also collaborated with Blunted Objects on a marijuana-themed statement necklace.

In September 2018, Laganja was interviewed by Civilized magazine about her music video for Look at Me that "slammed" the war on drugs. In January 2019, Laganja was featured on the podcast of cannabis information site Leafly.

The Laganja Estranja lifestyle brand includes a collaboration pre-rolled joint with San Francisco's The Hepburns, called "LAhepburns." Laganja also partnered with Fruit Slabs to create a cannabis edible for its 2019 pride collection.

=== Dance ===
Graduating from The California Institute of the Arts in 2011 with a bachelor of fine arts degree in dance and choreography, Laganja is a skilled choreographer, teacher, and dancer. A Presidential Scholar in The Arts, Laganja performed her original work “not today” at the Kennedy Center in 2007. Laganja is also a YoungArts Silver Winner and returns every year to the program to mentor high school students in Miami, Florida. Laganja's choreography credits include Germany's Next Top Model, NYC Cosmetics FACE Awards, and for commercial artists such as Miley Cyrus and Brooke Candy.

In mid-2017, Laganja led a dance theatre project on gender expression with artists across Europe assembling in Nottingham, UK for a four-day workshop and showcase exploring the boundaries of gender identity. “G[END]ER” was in collaboration with Backlit Gallery, Kitty Tray, and Nottingham Contemporary. In the fall of 2018, Laganja elaborated on this idea of gender expression with her dance residency at YoungArts. The immersive experience included live vocals, original compositions, and curated set design. In late-2018, Laganja was partnered with the Pérez Art Museum Miami (Pamm) to present the art of drag for a one-day Poplife Social YoungArts Takeover. The event at the world-renowned art museum included an invitation from Laganja herself, “Onto Pamm’s terrace to warm up their dance muscles, ‘sissy that walk’ across the space and participate in a fan dance inspired by traditional Japanese performance.”

In 2016, Laganja's Dance School, an international high-heels masterclass and confidence workshop, was founded with partner Kristen Lovell. The master class has been held in dozens of cities in the United States and as an international experience, has traveled to Manchester, Nottingham, London, Newcastle, Dublin, Lima, Mexico City, and Amsterdam. In 2019, the documentary Laganja's Dance School was released. The documentary was directed by Selene Kapsaski and chronicles Laganja Estranja teaching a dance class in London.

== Personal life ==
Laganja spoke out against Donald Trump while the latter was running for president of the United States. In 2021, she came out as a transgender woman.

== Discography ==
=== Singles ===
==== As lead artist ====
Title	Year
"Legs" (featuring Rye Rye)	2015
"Hotbox"	2015
"Tease 4u"	2016
"Look at Me" (featuring J. Tyler)	2018
"Smoke Break"	2018

==== As featured artist ====
Title	Year
"Got Beat" (Kraax featuring Laganja Estranja, Cool B. & Lissa Wick)	2014
"Oh No She Better Don't" (RuPaul featuring Drag Race Season 6 Cast)	2014
"Gold Grill BBQ" (Krysta Youngs featuring Laganja Estranja & Melanie Fontana)	2014
"Gimme All Your Money (Alaska Thunderfuck 5000 featuring Laganja Estranja)	2015

=== Guest appearances ===
Title	Year	Other artist(s)	Album
"Jealous of My Boogie"	2014	RuPaul	RuPaul Presents: The CoverGurlz
"Gimme All Your Money"	2015	Alaska Thunderfuck	Anus

== Filmography ==
=== Film ===
Year	Title	Role	Notes
2021	The Bitch Who Stole Christmas	Herself	

=== Television ===
Year	Title	Role	Notes	Ref.
2014	RuPaul's Drag Race	Herself (Contestant)	Season 6 – 8th place	
2014	Untucked	Herself	Companion show to RuPaul's Drag Race	
2015	Skin Wars	Herself	Season 2 - Guest	
2017, 2019	Bong Appétit	Herself	Season 1, Episode 6 - Guest	
2018	Germany's Next Topmodel	Herself	Season 13, Episode 14 - Guest	
2018	The Browns	Herself	Guest appearance	
2018–19	So You Think You Can Dance	Herself (Contestant)	Season 15	
2019	Queen of Drags	Herself (guest)	Episode 6	
2021	RuPaul's Drag Race All Stars (season 6)	Herself	"Lip Sync Assassin" (episode 3)	
2021	RuPaul's Drag Race All Stars: Untucked (season 3)	Herself	"Lip Sync Assassin" (episode 3)	
2021	Chopped 420	Herself (judge)	Judge	
2022	Dancing with the Stars	Herself	Season 31, Episode 11 - Guest	
2025	2025 MTV Video Music Awards	Herself	Performer with Sabrina Carpenter, Willam, Symone, Denali, and Lexi Love	

- Drag House Rules (2025)

=== Music videos ===
Title	Year	Director	Ref.
"Jealous of My Boogie"	2014	Jay Jackson	
"Got Beat"	2014	Kristen R. Lovell	
"Gold Grill BBQ"	2014	Kristen R. Lovell	
"Legs" (featuring Rye Rye) lyric video	2015		
"Gimme All Your Money" (featuring Laganja Estranja)	2016	Justin Andrew Honard	
"Green XXXMas"	2016	Kristen R. Lovell	

=== Music video appearances ===
Title	Year	Director	Ref.
"No Bueno" (Angel Haze)	2013	Frank Borin	
"Expensive" (Todrick Hall)	2016	Todrick Hall	
"Gimme All Your Money" (Alaska Thunderfuck 5000)	2016	Justin Andrew Honard & Nick Laughlin	
"Mask, Gloves, Soap, Scrubs" (Todrick Hall)	2020	Todrick Hall	
"S!ut" (Valencia Grace)	2026	Billy Cole Landers	

=== Web series ===
Year	Title	Role	Notes	Ref
2013	Ask A Mortician, In Conversation (by Caitlin Doughty)	Herself	Guest	
2014	Be$tie$ for Ca$h	Herself	Guest	
2014	Transformations	Herself	Guest	
2018	Wait, What?	Herself	Guest	
2018	Puff Puff Sessions	Herself	Host	
2019-23	The Pit Stop	Herself	Guest	
2020	Working Out Is a Drag	Herself	Guest	
2020	Bootleg Opinions	Herself	Guest	
2021	Binge Queens	Herself	Guest	
2021	Out of the Closet	Herself	Guest	
2022	Hi Jinkx! with Jinkx Monsoon	Herself	Podcast; Guest	
2023	Game Changer	Herself	Guest, "Game Changer: Battle Royale Pt. 4"	
2023	Sissy That Talk Show with Joseph Shepherd	Herself	Podcast; Guest	
