= Woodlawn Theatre =

Theatre in San Antonio, Texas

- Woodlawn Theatre Logo
- Interactive map of Woodlawn Theatre
- Address: 1920 Fredericksburg Rd; San Antonio, Texas 78201-4439; United States
- Owner: Woodlawn Entertainment Group (Shane Quade and Keith LaRosa)
- Operator: Woodlawn Comedy
- Capacity: 985
- Designation: City of San Antonio Historic Landmark
- Current use: comedy club

Construction
- Opened: August 17, 1945
- Reopened: September 6, 2006
- Rebuilt: 2006, 2012, 2024
- Architect: John Eberson

Website
- Venue Website (last good archive); Woodlawn Comedy website

The Woodlawn Theatre is located in San Antonio, Texas, and is one of the few theaters remaining designed by architect John Eberson. Eberson also designed the Majestic Theatre in San Antonio. The Woodlawn Theatre is designed in an art deco fashion, and was previously a prevalent movie theater, including hosting the world premiere of The Alamo in 1960. As of 2012, it is located in an area of San Antonio featuring buildings designed in art deco fashion known as the Deco District.

== History ==
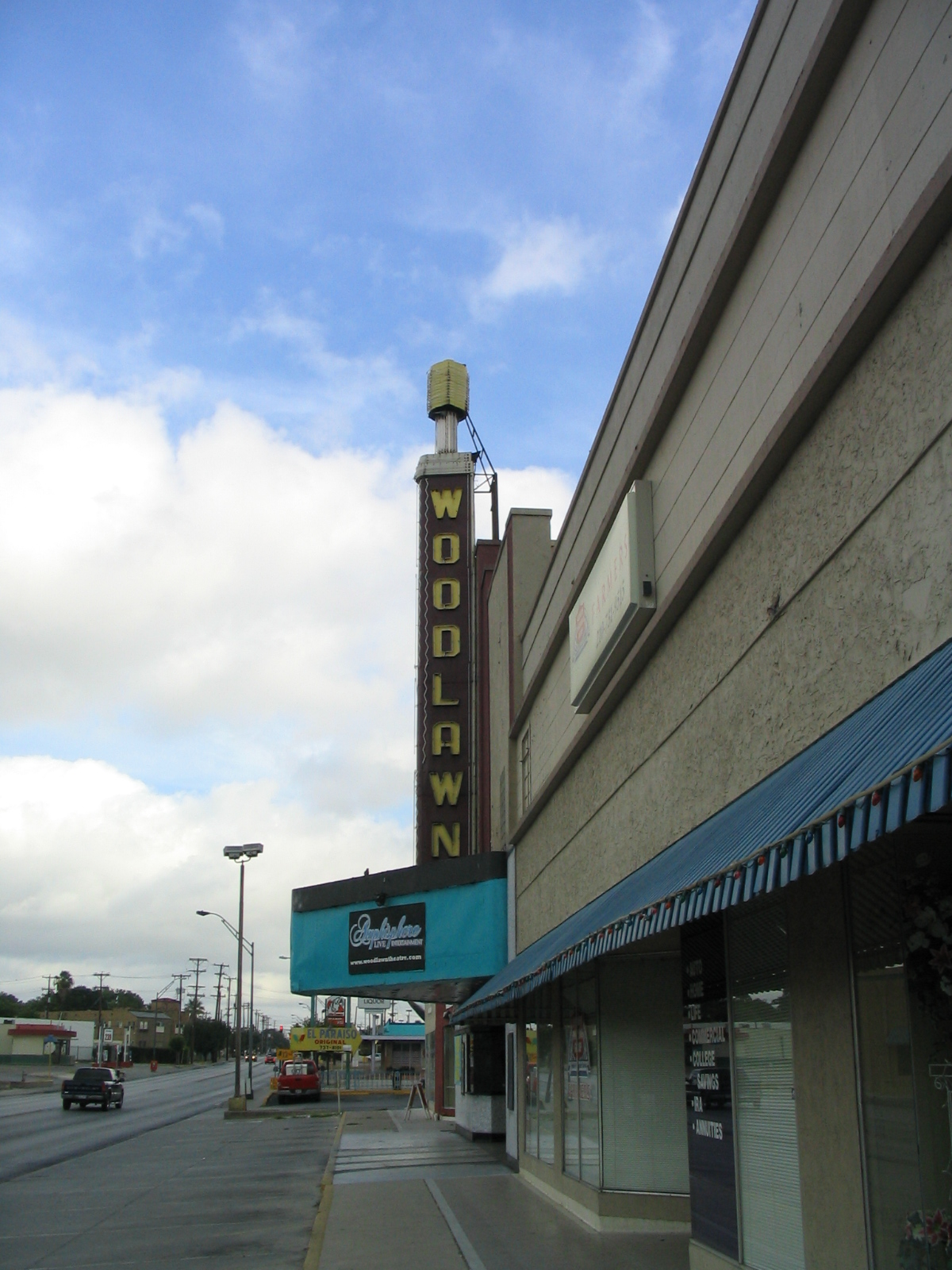
An exterior photo of the Woodlawn Theatre, taken July 4, 2009

The Woodlawn Theatre opened August 17, 1945 as an elegant venue for Hollywood films. On October 24, 1960, John Wayne hosted the world premiere of his film The Alamo at the Woodlawn. It continued to be an active movie house through the 1960s and 1970s, and was purchased by Santikos Theatres in 1975, but it eventually was forced to shut down. The building remained vacant and slowly deteriorated for a number of years, falling through the hands of many tenants, mostly small theater groups. In 1979, an acting group known as San Antonio Theater Center was housed there. In 1986, the Woodlawn premiered the laser-show tribute to Pink Floyd while hosting a series of jazz and blues concerts. In 2005, the last temporary tenant, known as Actors Theater of San Antonio, vacated the property.

In 2006, Jonathan Pennington began leasing the property under the production company name Amphisphere Theatre Productions. With support from the local community, Pennington completely revamped and rebuilt major portions of the Woodlawn Theatre, turning it into a community theatre stage and hosting a number of shows. The Woodlawn Theatre continued to host mostly musical theatre productions during Pennington's tenure, and the production company was eventually renamed to Pennington Productions.

In January 2012, the production company Woodlawn Theatre Inc was formed and took residency in Woodlawn Theatre on March 1, 2012. The building was then owned by Kurt and Sherry Wehner, but in May 2018 was sold to 1920 Woodlawn Partners, a limited liability company who purchased the entire city block including the Woodlawn. The Woodlawn Theatre's footprint expanded into an adjoining space which became a black box theater, and in 2014, that space became the home of the Classic Theatre of San Antonio. The neon marquee was restored in 2012 with the help of city funding, the lobby was completely restored, and work continued on the outside of the building. During their tenure at the theatre, Woodlawn Theater Inc continued to showcase live theatrical productions with an emphasis on musical theatre.

In 2013, Woodlawn Theatre was designated a City of San Antonio Historic Landmark.

On July 13, 2022, it was announced that Woodlawn Theatre Inc had made plans to move out of the facility sometime in early 2023 and rename their production company. In September 2022 it was announced that the production company would be renamed to Wonder Theatre and that the building itself would retain its former name. Wonder Theatre vacated the Woodlawn sometime in early 2024.

In April 2025, it was announced that the venue had been once again refurbished with an increase in seating capacity, and was now repurposed as a comedy club. The comedy club opened on April 12, 2025, with Pauly Shore as the headliner.
