= Anus (album) =

Studio album by Alaska Thunderfuck
- Released: June 23, 2015
- Genre: Pop
- Length: 46:50
- Labels: Sidecar; Producer Entertainment Group
- Producers: Tomas Costanza; Paul Coultrup

Alaska Thunderfuck chronology
Anus (2015)	Poundcake (2016)

Singles from Anus
- 1. "Your Makeup Is Terrible" Released: June 10, 2014; 2. "Nails" Released: December 9, 2014; 3. "Hieeee" Released: June 9, 2015; 4. "This Is My Hair" Released: June 23, 2015

Anus is the debut studio album by American drag performer Alaska Thunderfuck, the stage name of Justin Honard. It was released on June 23, 2015, through Sidecar Records and Producer Entertainment Group. After signing a recording contract with Producer Entertainment Group in 2013, Alaska Thunderfuck began planning the album that same year and work continued into 2015. She enlisted a variety of producers for the album, which also features guest vocals from fellow RuPaul's Drag Race contestants: season four's Willam, and season six's Courtney Act and Laganja Estranja.

The album was promoted with five singles: "Your Makeup Is Terrible", "Nails", "Hieeee", "This Is My Hair", and the title track. Alaska Thunderfuck also supported the album with a concert tour during January 2016.

== Release and promotion ==
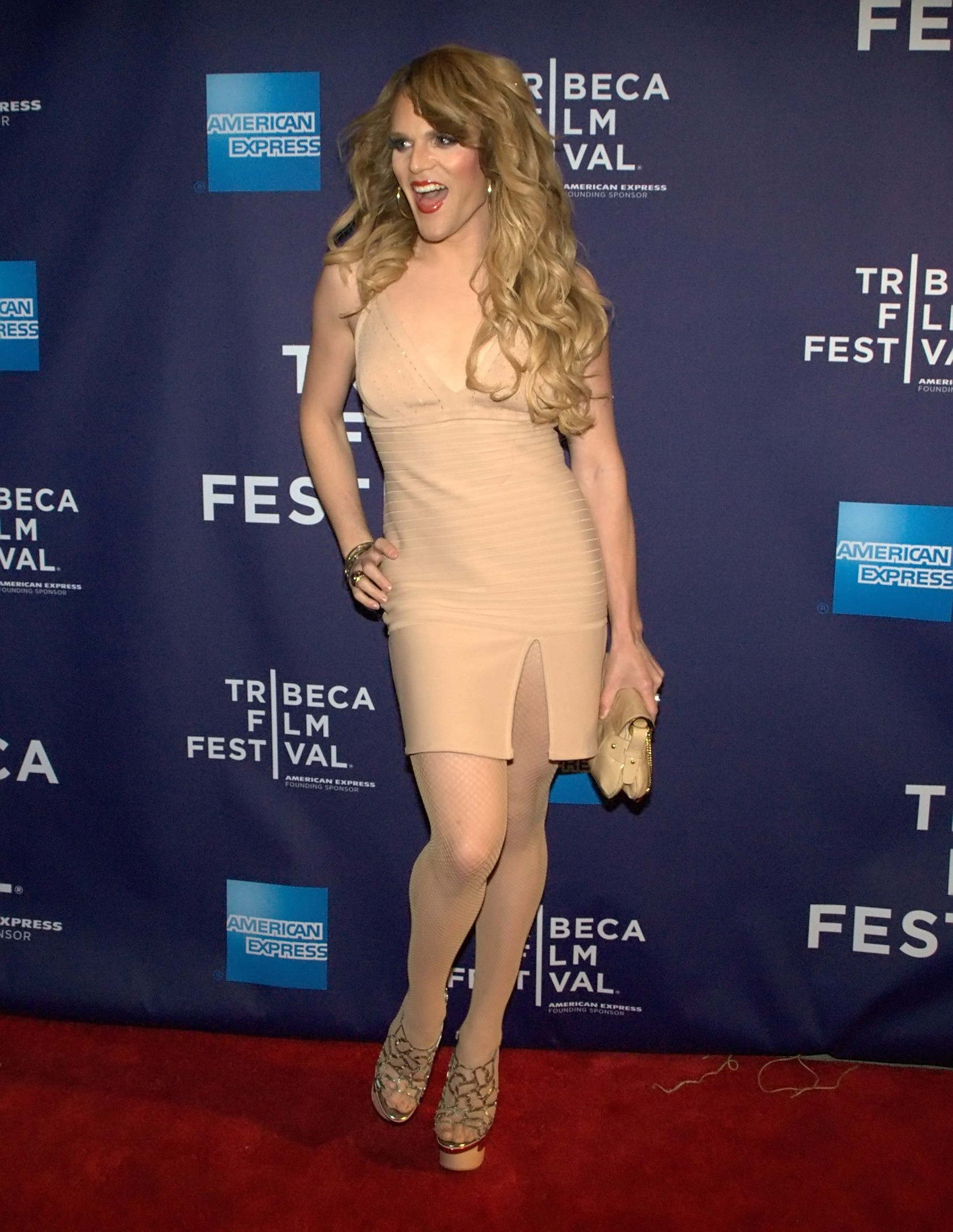
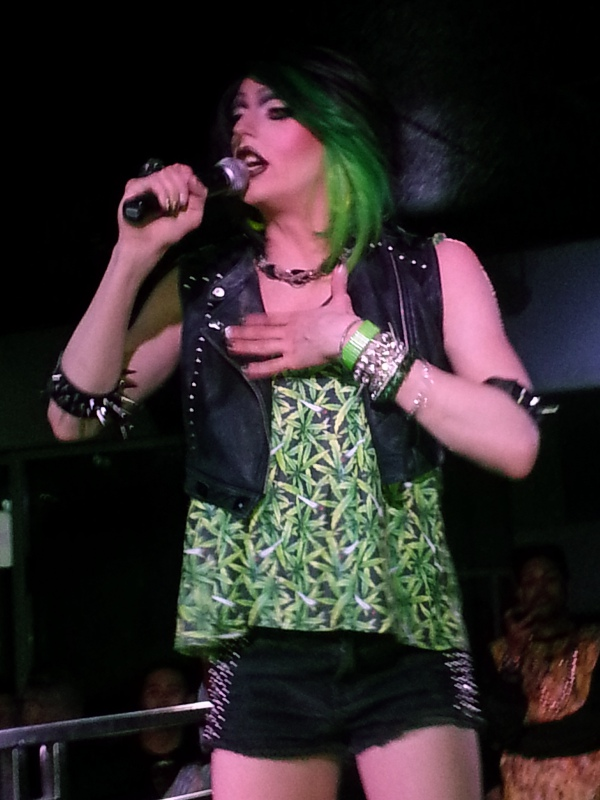
RuPaul's Drag Race alumni Willam and Laganja Estranja both contribute vocals to Anus.

The artwork and track listing for Anus was released on June 9, 2015. The CD version of the album was released on July 21, 2015, while an LP version was released on November 13, 2015.

=== Singles ===
On June 10, 2014, "Your Makeup Is Terrible" was released as the first single from Anus. Pitchfork named the song as the best song ever by a RuPaul's Drag Race contestant. The video for "Your Makeup Is Terrible" was released on June 9, 2014, and was directed by Saša Numić.

On December 9, 2014, "Nails" was released as the second single from the album.

On June 9, 2015, "Hieeee" was released as the third single from Anus. "Hieeee" charted at number five on the US Billboard Comedy Digital Tracks chart. "Hieeee" was noted as being the "best of the worst" songs by RuPaul's Drag Race contestants by Pitchfork.

On June 23, 2015, the same day as the album's release, "This Is My Hair" was released as Anus's fourth single.

In an interview with Noisey, Honard stated that he plans to shoot music videos for the tracks "Anus", "The Shade of It All", "Pussy", and "Gimme All Your Money".

== Critical reception ==
In his review for Noisey, John Hill simply stated "Anus is a really fucking good album." In his list of "The Best and Worst Music of RuPaul's Drag Divas" for Pitchfork, Andy Emitt praised "Your Makeup Is Terrible", writing that "If any 'Drag Race' diva rivals the immaculate confection of "Supermodel (You Better Work)", it is Alaska Thunderfuck with 'Your Makeup Is Terrible'. In her indescribable voice, Alaska satirizes the dance genre's formulaic predictability on the song's bridge, narrating its rhythmic shift as if surprised herself", later noting "the RuPaulian tradition in Alaska's ability to bridge the song's queer, camp elements with pop music aspirations through a club-ready beat." Emitt went on to list "Hieee" as one of the "fabulously worst" tracks from Drag Race Divas, saying "the song sounds like the catchphrase-ready queen running out of new material live on the studio mic. Apparently, this isn't a problem—the track thumps the hollow but always captivating reservoir of Thunderfuck tonality and delivery... When drag divas produce garbage, at least we're laughing with them."

== Commercial performance ==
For the week of July 11, 2015, Anus appeared on three Billboard charts: number four on the Heatseekers, an extension to the Billboard 200; number three on the Dance/Electronic Albums; and number fourteen on the Independent Albums chart.

== Track listing ==
Credits adapted from the liner notes of Anus.

All tracks are written by Justin Honard, Tomas Costanza, and Ashley Levy, and produced by Costanza and Paul Coultrup; except where noted.

No.	Title	Writer(s)	Producer	Length
1.	"Hieeee"			3:46
2.	"Anus"			2:48
3.	"Pussy"			2:37
4.	"Beard"			3:06
5.	"This Is My Hair"			3:00
6.	"Nails" (Piano Introduction) (featuring Jeremy Mark Mikush)	Honard; Mikush	Mikush	1:05
7.	"Nails"	Honard; Mikush; Costanza; Levy		3:16
8.	"Gimme All Your Money" (featuring Laganja Estranja)	Honard; Jay Jackson; Costanza; Levy		3:36
9.	"Everything Tonight"			3:34
10.	"Best Night Ever"			2:47
11.	"The Shade of It All" (featuring Courtney Act and Willam)	Honard; Shane Jenek; Willam Belli; Costanza; Levy	Costanza; Mikush; Coultrup ^{[a]}	4:41
12.	"Legendary"			3:37
13.	"Killer"			5:00
14.	"Your Makeup Is Terrible"	Honard; Mikush; Costanza; Levy		3:57
Total length:				46:50

Notes

- ^{^[a]} signifies a co-producer
- "Nails" and "Best Night Ever" were excluded from the vinyl pressing

== Charts ==
Chart (2015)	Peak position
US Dance/Electronic Albums (Billboard)	3
US Heatseekers Albums (Billboard)	4
US Independent Albums (Billboard)	14

== Release history ==
Country	Date	Format	Label	Ref.
Various	June 23, 2015	Digital download	Sidecar	
Various	July 21, 2015	CD	Sidecar	
Various	November 13, 2015	LP	Sidecar	
