= Jackie Beat =

American drag artist

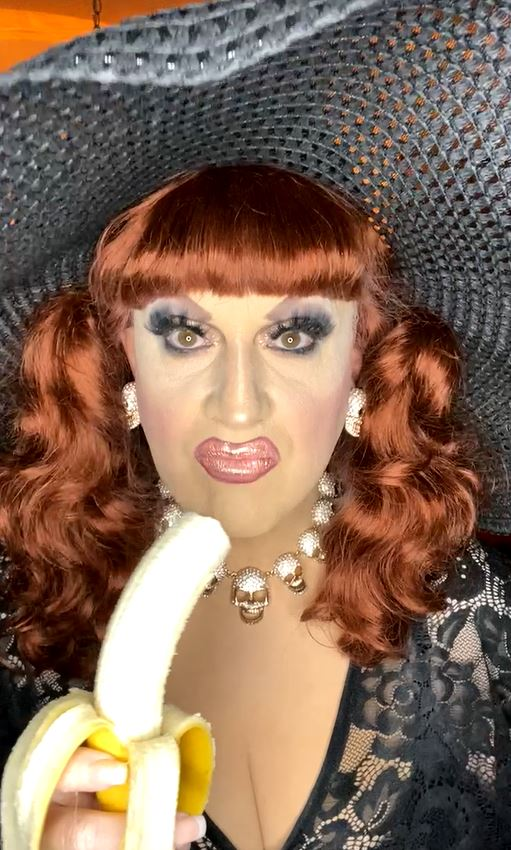
- Jackie Beat, October 2021
- Born: Kent Fuher; July 24, 1963 (age 63); West Covina, California
- Occupation: Drag performer
- Website: MissJackieBeat

Jackie Beat (born July 24, 1963) is the drag persona of actor, singer, songwriter and screenwriter Kent Fuher. Beat has appeared in a number of independent feature films both in and out of drag, including Wigstock: The Movie, Flawless, and Adam & Steve (for which he also wrote and performed the song "Dance Off"). In television, Beat has appeared on Sex and the City and was a writer for the short-lived sketch comedy series Hype on The WB Television Network.

Beat was a fixture on the New York City cabaret scene and performs sold-out Gay Pride and Christmas runs every year. She has performed at clubs such as Martinis Above Fourth in San Diego, CA; Executive Suite in Long Beach, CA; Hamburger Mary's in West Hollywood; Cavern Club in Silver Lake; Badlands in Sacramento, CA; Re-bar and Julia's Restaurant in Seattle, WA; and the Laurie Beechman Theatre in New York City. She has also appeared at Bob's Comedy Funhouse in Cardiff, Sheffield, Nottingham, Manchester, and London; 170 Russell in Melbourne, Australia; FAMILY in Brisbane, Australia, and numerous other venues.

In 2015, Beat was the host of Seattle Pride’s Pride Parade.

In March of 2019, Beat appeared as Bea Arthur at an event called The MisMatch Game, hosted by Dennis Hensley, for the Los Angeles LGBT Center's 15th Anniversary celebration. Beat frequently performs as both Arthur and her Golden Girls character Dorothy Zbornak, notably in the parody theater show The Golden Gurlz.

Beat has been profiled by major news outlets such as The Los Angeles Times, The Huffington Post, LA Weekly, and The New York Times.

== Early life ==
Beat was born Kent Fuher on July 24, 1963 to Jack and Liliana Fuher. She debuted her drag persona at Los Angeles's Café Largo in the late 1980s.

== Music ==
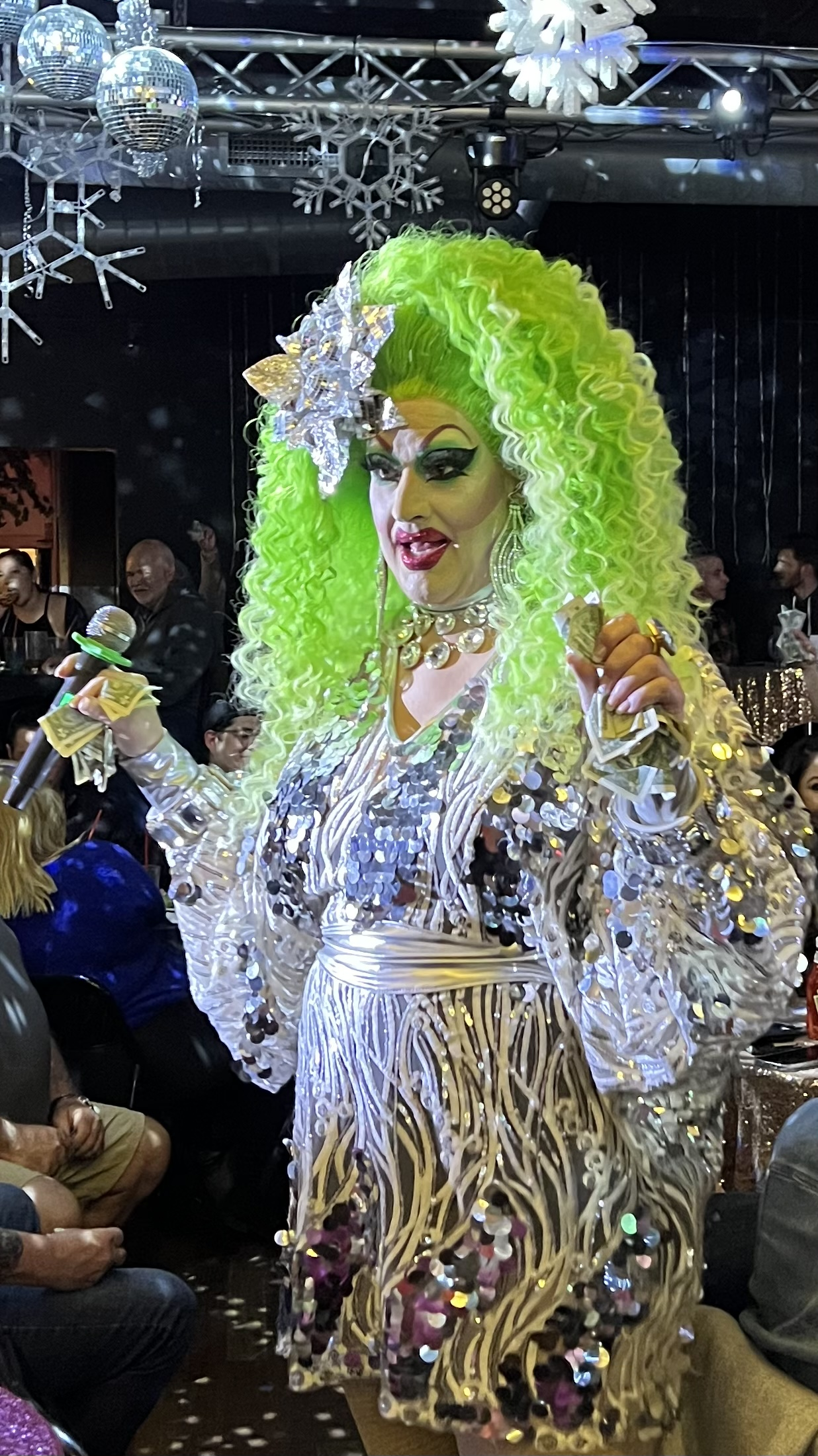
Jackie Beat performing in 2022

Beat is the lead singer of the Electroclash band Dirty Sanchez. She has also released seven albums as a solo artist, primarily R-rated parodies of mainstream songs.

== Personal life ==
Beat lived in the Highland Park neighborhood of Los Angeles for many years. She sold her home there in 2016 and currently resides in Altadena, California. She is a vocal supporter of President Barack Obama and a harsh critic of figures such as Donald Trump and former presidential hopeful Sarah Palin.

== Filmography ==
=== Film ===
Year	Title	Role	Notes
1993	Grief	Jo / Harvey	Appeared in drag, as well as a man
1995	Blue Movie	Dulcinea Schwartzfeld	
1995	Wigstock: The Movie	Himself	
1995	Mi Pollo Loco	Lupe	
1995	Another Goddamn Benefit		
1996	Two Days at a Time	Mackenzie/Pat/Richard/Sharon	Writer; short film
1996	Scream, Teen, Scream	Jackie DePalma	
1996	Encino Woman	Doorman	
1998	Downtown Darlings	Himself	
1999	Charlie!	Plenty Powers	
1999	Flawless	Gypsy	
2003	Coming Out Party	Himself	
2005	Adam & Steve	Himself	
2005	Bam Bam and Celeste	Shandra	
2005	A Couple of Days and Nights	Roger	
2006	Apparition of the Eternal Church	Himself	
2006	Gotta Get Off This Merry Go Round: Sex, Dolls and Showtunes	Himself	
2006	Phone Sex	Caller	
2007	Alexis Arquette: She's My Brother	Himself	
2010	Gaze	Himself	
2011	Gingerdead Man 3: Saturday Night Cleaver	Trixie	
2013	I Am Divine	Himself	
2020	Stage Mother	Dusty Muffin	
2023	Poolman	Dorothy	

=== Television ===
Year	Title	Role	Notes
1995	Out There in Hollywood	Himself	
1996	Encino Woman	Doorman	
1999	Sex and the City	Drag Caller	Episode 21: "Old Dogs, New Dicks"
2000	Hype		Writer
2004	Totally Gayer	Himself	
2004	Seriously, Dude, I'm Gay	Himself	Unaired special from Fox
2004	Tripping the Rift		Writer; Episode 3: "Miss Galaxy 5000"
2006	Roseanne Barr: Blonde and Bitchin	Himself	
2007	Last Comic Standing	Himself	Episode 10: "The Final Seven"
2008	Fashion Police		Writer; 179 Episodes
2009	House of Venus Show	Himself	Season 3, Episode 1
2010	One Night Stand Up	Himself	Episode 7: "Dragtastic"
2010	The Gossip Queens	Himself	Episode 8 and 15
2011	Selene's Hollywood Confidential	Himself	
2012	StandUp in Stilettos		Writer; Season 1, Episode 1
2012	Comedy Central Roast		Writer; Season 1, Episode 12: "Comedy Central Roast of Roseanne"
2012	Where the Bears Are	Himself	Episode 12: "Bear Reunion"
2021	The Sherry Vine Show	Himself	Guest & Writer
2022	Huluween Dragstravaganza	Himself	Hulu special
2022	Dr. Jackie	Dr. Jackie	
2023	Drag Me to Dinner	Contestant (episode 1)	Hulu original
2023	Celebrity Family Feud	Guest	
2025	King of Drag	Himself; guest judge	1 episode

=== Web Series ===
Year	Title	Role	Notes
2014	Hey Qween!	Himself	Guest (as Kent Fuher)
2015	Transformations	Himself	Guest

=== Video games ===
Year	Title	Role	Notes
1995	Ms. Metaverse	Jackie Beat*	

(* - though the character shared Beat's real life name, she portrayed a fictional character similar to herself)

== Podcasts ==
Year	Title	Role	Notes
Oct 5, 2012	Eat My Podcast	Himself	
2017	Listen Sweetie	Himself	
Dec 1, 2017	UnBEARable	Himself	
Feb 20, 2018	Feast of Fun	Himself	
Mar 28, 2018	The Soft Spot	Himself	
May 9, 2019	Ghosted! by Roz Hernandez	Himself	
Sep 23, 2019	Monday Afternoon Movie	Himself	
Oct 1, 2019	The Margaret Cho	Himself	
Jan 12, 2021	The Bald and the Beautiful w/ Trixie & Katya	Himself	
Dec 3, 2021	Ebony and Irony	Himself	
Jul 1, 2022	Race Chaser with Alaska & Willam	Himself	
Sep 28, 2022	JUST SAYIN' with Justin Martindale	Himself	
Oct 10, 2022	The Perez Hilton Podcast with Chris Booker	Himself	
Oct 31, 2022	Very Delta with Delta Work	Himself	
Jul 28, 2023	Race Chaser with Alaska & Willam	Himself	
Jan 15, 2024	Ghosted! by Roz Hernandez	Himself	
Jun 21, 2024	Sloppy Seconds with Big Dipper & Meatball	Himself	
Jun 19, 2025	RnR with Courtney Act	Himself	
