= Abu Anas al-Shami =

Militant group leader (died 2004)

Shaykh Abu Anas Al-Shami
- أبو أنس الشامي
- Born: 1969; Kuwait
- Died: 16 September 2004 (aged 34–35); Abu Ghraib, Iraq
- Cause of death: Air strike
- Education: Islamic University of Madinah
- Organization: Jama'at al-Tawhid wal-Jihad

Umar Yusuf Jumah Salih (Arabic: عمر يوسف جمعة صالح; 1969 – 16 September 2004), better known by his nom de guerre Abu Anas al-Shami (Arabic: أبو أنس الشامي, romanized: ʾAbū ʾAnas ash-Shāmī, lit. 'Father of Anas, the Levantine'), was a Kuwaiti-born Islamic theologian and militant leader of Palestinian origin who was a senior member in the Jama'at al-Tawhid wal-Jihad militant group during the Iraqi insurgency.

According to the late ISIS cleric Turki al-Binali, he mentored Abu Muhammad al-Adnani, the late spokesman of the Islamic State.

== History ==
Abu Anas Al-Shami was a Palestinian cleric, teacher, writer, and jihadist militant born in Kuwait. It has been said that "from the age of 14, Abu Anas had mastered the complexities of the Arabic language, and a year later memorized the entire Quran." Originally from the Palestinian West Bank town of Yabroud, Abu Anas obtained an Islamic studies degree at the Islamic University of Madinah in Saudi Arabia, during his time there, he interacted with Ahmad Musa Jibril on many occasions.

In the mid-1990s he went to Bosnia-Herzegovina to teach Islam in towns and refugee camps. He then returned to Jordan and became a preacher in the neighborhood of Sweileh. In the late 1990s, the Jordanian officials shut down an Islamic center that al-Shami had established in Amman on the grounds that it was promoting anti-government activity and an extreme interpretation of Islam.

During his time in Afghanistan, he fought under the banner of Usama Ibn Laden and met with Abdullah 'Azzam.

== Iraq ==
In late 2003, al-Shami joined Jama'at al-Tawhid wal-Jihad leader Abu Musab al-Zarqawi in Iraq. He was appointed to the advisory council of the group and soon became Zarqawi's second-in-command. He was both spiritual advisor to the group and directed many of its attacks and battles against American and Iraqi forces. In a May 2004 letter he wrote that his 300 mujahideen had fought-off over 2,000 U.S. Marines in the First Battle of Fallujah.

In one audio tape in August 2004, a speaker identified as Abu Anas al-Shami (right-hand man of Zarqawi and leader of Jama'at al-Tawhid wal-Jihad made up mostly by foreigners) said the militants planned to assassinate Iraqi prime minister Ayad Allawi alongside other high-ranking soldiers and police officers.

== Death ==
Abu Anas al-Shami was killed by an American air strike against his car on 16 September 2004 near Abu Ghraib, when he had been sent by Zarqawi to the Sadr City area of Baghdad. A eulogy to him was written by Zarqawi's first spiritual mentor, Abu Muhammad al-Maqdisi, and appeared on the Tawhid website which is run by Maqdisi's organisation on behalf of Jama'at al-Tawhid wal-Jihad.
