= Anus, Yonne =

Human settlement in France

Coordinates: 47°35′51″N 3°31′57″E

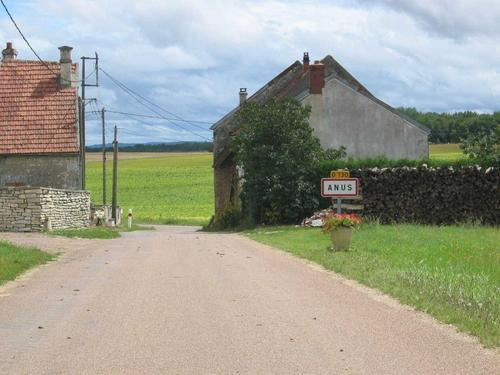
Anus, France

Anus (French pronunciation: [a.ny]) is a locality in Burgundy, France, within the commune of Fouronnes, in the Yonne department.

== Toponymy ==
In the 1600s, Anus's name was also written Asnux and Aznu. Even though it is spelled the same way as the body orifice, it is not pronounced the same way, the final "s" being omitted.

Due to its peculiar name, Anus's road signs are often stolen.

== History ==
Anus was anciently parished with Fouronnes, the parish sometimes being called Fouronne et Anus. In 1848, the two together had seventy households, of which nineteen were at Anus. In the 16th century, Anus had its own seigneur, who in 1598 was Guillaume Girard.
