= Big Dipper (rapper) =

American rapper and podcaster

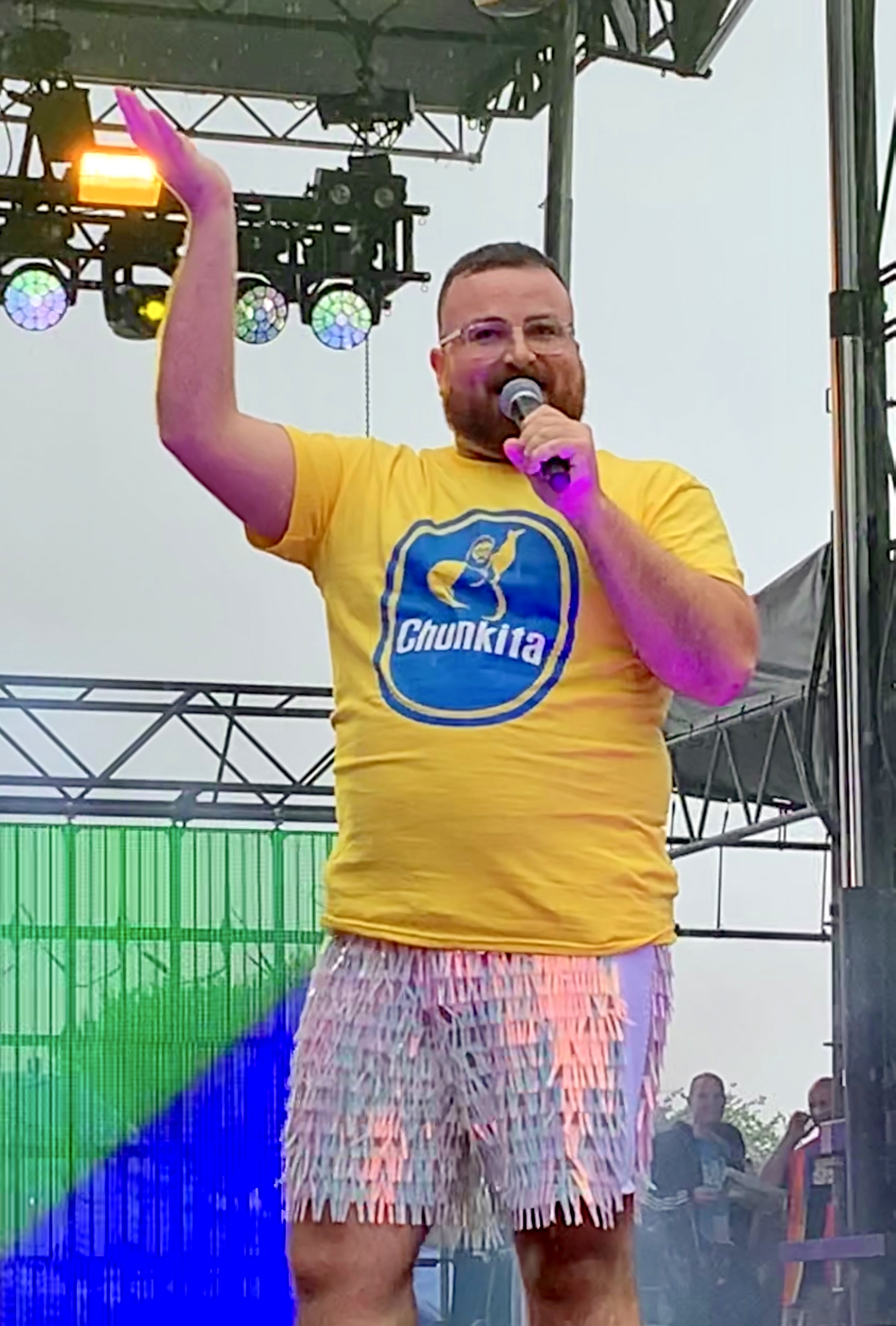
- Big Dipper performing at the 2019 Capital Pride festival concert

Background information
- Born: Daniel Stermer; April 6, 1985 (age 41)
- Genres: Rap
- Spouse: DeAndre Cortez Way (m. 2022)

Dan Stermer is an American rapper and podcaster known professionally as Big Dipper.

== Early life and education ==
Stermer was raised in Evanston, Illinois. His mother is Jewish, and his father is Christian. Stermer was raised in a Jewish household and attended Sunday school at a Reform synagogue. He first began performing at the age of eight in a children's theater production of The Wizard of Oz. In his youth, Stermer tried learning several instruments, including the cello, piano, trumpet, tuba and the drums, before realizing that he enjoyed acting in stage plays more. In the 1990s, he began listening to hip hop and rap, around the age of nine. He had a bar mitzvah in the eighth grade, and was confirmed in 10th grade after taking more Jewish studies classes.

Stermer graduated from Ithaca College in 2007, where he studied theater.

== Career ==
Stermer wrote his first song at the age of 25. He began using the name 'Big Dipper' the following year, at the age of 26. As of 2018, he is based in Los Angeles. He has performed at various LGBT pride and bear festivals, P-town, and San Francisco Bear Pride. In 2019, he was a headliner at Washington, DC's Capital Pride. He stated that one reason he performed at the event was to combat hatred and help people feel empowered.

On August 24, 2018, Big Dipper released his debut album, Late Bloomer. He had cohosted the podcast Unbearable with Meatball, a fellow bear and drag queen. After a hiatus, the duo returned in June 2019 with a new podcast, Sloppy Seconds, on the Forever Dog network. As of 2024, the podcast is also available on Moguls of Media (MOM)'s YouTube page. On the program, Big Dipper and Meatball interview a variety of celebrities, primarily within or allied-with the LGBT community, including actors, adult film stars, comedians, drag queens and other performers.

== Artistry ==
Big Dipper's minstrel-style work is often explicit and involves themes of sex and humor. He has been compared to fellow gay rapper Cazwell.

== Personal life ==
Big Dipper is gay and identifies as a member of the bear community.

== Discography ==
=== Albums ===
- Late Bloomer (2018)

=== Singles ===
- "Drip Drop" (2011)
- "Summertime Realness"
- "LaCroix Boi"
- "Skank"
- "Dick in a Box"
- "Meat Quotient"
- "Cut Up"
- "Pressed"
- "That Nut"
- "Lookin"
- "Let's Talk about PrEP"
