= Trixie Motel =

Reality television series

- Promotional poster
- Genre: Reality television
- Created by: Trixie Mattel; David Silver
- Directed by: Bob Schermerhorn
- Starring: Trixie Mattel; David Silver; Brandon Lim; Dani Dazey; David Rios; Dan Vickery
- Opening theme: "Stay the Night" by Trixie Mattel
- Country of origin: United States
- No. of seasons: 2
- No. of episodes: 12

Production
- Executive producers: Trixie Mattel; David Silver; Bob Schermerhorn; Megan McCoy; Josie Crimi; Drew Scott; Jonathan Scott
- Production location: Palm Springs, California
- Cinematography: Daniel Brothers
- Production company: Scott Brothers Entertainment

Original release
- Network: Discovery+
- Release: June 3 – July 15, 2022
- Network: Max
- Release: June 1 – June 22, 2024

Trixie Motel is an American reality television docuseries that follows Trixie Mattel (the stage name of drag queen Brian Firkus) and her then-partner David Silver as they buy and renovate a rundown motel in Palm Springs, California.

A second season, titled Trixie Motel: Drag Me Home, premiered on June 1, 2024 on Max.

== Background ==
Mattel based the aesthetics of the motel on her drag character, her web series UNHhhh with Katya Zamolodchikova, and her beauty brand Trixie Cosmetics, among other inspirations. The location was originally named Ruby Montana's Coral Sands Inn; Mattel had originally planned to transform it into an Airbnb rental but changed her mind after viewing the property. According to Mattel she spent around $1.9 million to purchase the space and $500,000 to renovate it, enlisting designer Dani Dazey to collaborate on the project.

== Cast ==
=== Main ===
- Trixie Mattel, drag queen, comedian, singer and co-owner of the motel
- David Silver, film and television producer, Trixie's ex-partner and co-owner of the motel
- Brandon Lim, Trixie's assistant (season 1)
- Dani Dazey, the motel renovation's interior designer (season 1)
- David Rios, the motel renovation's project manager (season 1)
- Dan Vickery, interior designer for Trixie and David's new home (season 2)

=== Special guests ===
Celebrity guests appear throughout the series to assist the owners and give them advice on how to renovate their property.

==== Season 1 Episode 1, "Pink Flamingo" ====
- Lisa Vanderpump, restaurateur and television personality
- Old Gays, social media personalities
- Andrew and Nicole Norman of Mojo Glassworks

==== Season 1 Episode 2, "Queen of Hearts" ====
- Nicole Byer, actress and comedian
- Mo Heart, drag queen
- Nicholas Scheppard and Jenson Titus of Very Gay Paint
- Vania Nasution and Jessica Stevens of Trixie Cosmetics

==== Season 1 Episode 3, "Yeehaw Cowgirl" ====
- Orville Peck, country singer
- Brittany Broski, internet personality

==== Season 1 Episode 4, "Atomic Bombshell" ====
- Jaida Essence Hall, drag queen
- Juno Birch, drag queen
- George Schneider, co-owner of This Is It!
- Val Zlomaniec, Trixie's mother
- Samantha Zlomaniec, Trixie's sister
- Nicholas Scheppard and Jenson Titus of Very Gay Paint
- Christy Holstege, Mayor of Palm Springs

==== Season 1 Episode 5, "Flower Power" ====
- Jonathan Scott, television personality and producer
- Zooey Deschanel, actress and singer
- Iggy Azalea, rapper and model

==== Season 1 Episode 6, "Malibu Barbara" ====
- Leslie Jordan, actor and writer
- Belinda Carlisle, musician
- Ashley Levy, songwriter and record producer
- Tomas Costanza, songwriter and record producer

==== Season 1 Episode 7, "Oh Honeymoon" ====
- Gigi Gorgeous, internet personality, actress and model
- Jonathan Bennett, actor and TV host
- Jaymes Vaughan, actor and TV host

==== Season 1 Episode 8, "Pride Grand Opening" ====
- Jaymes Mansfield, drag queen
- Emily Hampshire, actress
- Juno Birch, drag queen
- Katya Zamolodchikova, drag queen
- Monét X Change, drag queen
- Fena Barbitall, drag queen
- Bob the Drag Queen, drag queen
- Manila Luzon, drag queen
- Kim Chi, drag queen
- Alaska Thunderfuck, drag queen
- Brooke Lynn Hytes, drag queen
- Nicholas Scheppard and Jenson Titus of Very Gay Paint

==== Season 2 Episode 1, "Oh Honey! I'm Home!" ====
- Christine Quinn, realtor and television personality
- Drew Scott, television personality and producer
- Jonathan Scott, television personality and producer

==== Season 2 Episode 2, "Out of the Closet and Into the Bedroom" ====
- Juno Birch, drag queen
- Orville Peck, country singer
- Nicole Byer, actress and comedian

==== Season 2 Episode 3, "Shaken, Served and Slayed" ====
- Katya Zamolodchikova, drag queen
- Nicholas Scheppard and Jenson Titus of Very Gay Paint
- James Mobley, artist
- Jaymes Mansfield, drag queen
- Gia Gunn, drag queen
- Lyric, Trixie Mattel impersonator and drag queen
- Jeffrey Bernstein, Mayor pro tem of Palm Springs, California

==== Season 2 Episode 4, "Home to Slay" ====
- Lisa Vanderpump, hospitality mogul and reality star
- Brittany Broski, Internet personality

Additionally, many of the guest stars from the season came to the housewarming party, including Orville Peck, Nicole Byer, Nicholas Scheppard, Jenson Titus, and Katya.

== Episodes ==
=== Series overview ===
| Season | Episodes | Originally released | | |
| Season | Episodes | First released | Last released | Network |
|---|---|---|---|---|
| 1 | 8 | June 3, 2022 | July 15, 2022 | Discovery+ |
| 2 | 4 | June 1, 2024 | June 22, 2024 | Max |

=== Season 1 (2022) ===
| No. overall | No. in season | Title | Directed by | Original release date |
|---|---|---|---|---|
| 1 | 1 | "Pink Flamingo" | Bob Schermerhorn | June 3, 2022 |
| 2 | 2 | "Queen of Hearts" | Bob Schermerhorn | June 3, 2022 |
| 3 | 3 | "Yeehaw Cowgirl" | Bob Schermerhorn | June 10, 2022 |
| 4 | 4 | "Atomic Bombshell" | Bob Schermerhorn | June 17, 2022 |
| 5 | 5 | "Flower Power" | Bob Schermerhorn | June 24, 2022 |
| 6 | 6 | "Malibu Barbara" | Bob Schermerhorn | July 1, 2022 |
| 7 | 7 | "Oh Honeymoon" | Bob Schermerhorn | July 8, 2022 |
| 8 | 8 | "Pride Grand Opening" | Bob Schermerhorn | July 15, 2022 |

=== Season 2: Drag Me Home (2024) ===
| No. overall | No. in season | Title | Original release date |
|---|---|---|---|
| 9 | 1 | "Oh Honey! I'm Home!" | June 1, 2024 |
| 10 | 2 | "Out of the Closet and Into the Bedroom" | June 8, 2024 |
| 11 | 3 | "Shaken, Served and Slayed" | June 15, 2024 |
| 12 | 4 | "Home to Slay" | June 22, 2024 |

== Promotion ==
The trailer for the series was released via YouTube on May 4, 2022, featuring Mattel's song "Stay the Night" from her fourth studio album The Blonde & Pink Albums, which was also used as the series' opening theme; Mattel said that she wrote the song with the series in mind before a television deal had been struck. Shortly after the series' premiere Discovery+ published ten-minute sneak peek clips of the beginnings of the first two episodes via their YouTube channel. Trixie has also used part of the first episode as her opening act during her "Grown Up" tour to help promote the series.

== Reception ==
=== Accolades ===
| Year | Award | Category | Nominee(s) | Result | Ref. |
|---|---|---|---|---|---|
| 2023 | Queerty Awards | Reality/Docu-series | Trixie Motel | Won | |
| 2023 | GLAAD Media Awards | Outstanding Reality Program | Trixie Motel | Nominated | |
| 2023 | Critics' Choice Real TV Awards | Best Lifestyle Show: Home/Garden | Trixie Motel | Nominated | |
| 2023 | Critics' Choice Real TV Awards | Best Show Host | Trixie Mattel | Nominated | |
| 2024 | Queerty Awards | Next Big Thing | Trixie Motel: Drag Me Home | Runner-up | |
| 2025 | Canadian Cinema Editors Awards | Best Editing in Lifestyle | Lindsay Ragone, "Oh Honey! I'm Home!" - Trixie Motel: Drag Me Home | Won | |
