= Moving parts (disambiguation) =

Moving parts are machinery and engineering components.

Moving Parts may also refer to:

- Moving Parts, a 1970s band from Boston, Massachusetts
- "Moving Parts" a concert tour and song by Trixie Mattel from One Stone
  - Trixie Mattel: Moving Parts, a 2019 documentary film about Mattel

== See also ==
- Fewer Moving Parts, a 2006 album by David Bazan
