= Homemade Christmas =

EP by Trixie Mattel
- Released: December 1, 2017
- Genre: Christmas
- Length: 7:49
- Label: Self-released

Trixie Mattel chronology
Two Birds (2017)	Homemade Christmas (2017)	One Stone (2018)

Homemade Christmas is an EP by American drag queen Trixie Mattel, released on December 1, 2017.

== Background and release ==
Brian Michael Firkus, better known by the stage name Trixie Mattel, competed in the seventh season of RuPaul's Drag Race in 2015. After appearing on Drag Race, Mattel appeared in the web series UNHhhh on WOWPresents with fellow season seven contestant Katya Zamolodchikova, known mononymously as Katya. The duo later went on to star in The Trixie & Katya Show, which premiered on Viceland on November 15, 2017.

Prior to Homemade Christmas, Trixie Mattel released the country album Two Birds in May 2017. Katya appears on the holiday EP, which was released on December 1, 2017 via Apple Music, iTunes, and Spotify.

== Composition ==
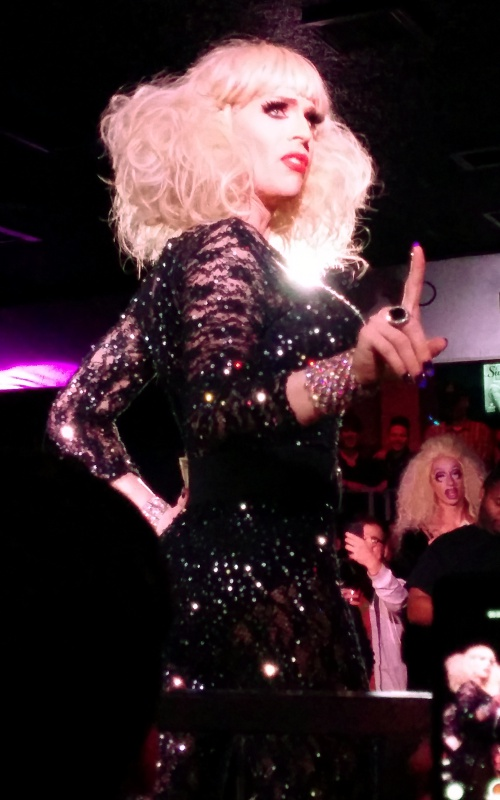
"The Night Before Contact" features Katya (pictured in 2015), a fellow contestant on the seventh season of RuPaul's Drag Race.

Homemade Christmas includes three acoustic tracks of holiday music. Lyrically, "Christmas Without You" is about loneliness during the season. "The Night Before Contact" is a parody of "A Visit from St. Nicholas" (more commonly known as "'Twas the Night Before Christmas"), performed by Katya. "All I Want for Christmas Is Nudes" is a parody of Mariah Carey's "All I Want for Christmas Is You".

== Reception ==
Instinct's David Lopez said "Christmas Without You" was reminiscent of Trixie Mattel's previous studio album. He said of "The Night Before Contact": "Personally, after hearing this, I think Katya could be the new voice of the omnipresent narrator if they ever remade How the Grinch Stole Christmas!"

== Track listing ==
Homemade Christmas track listing
No.	Title	Writer(s)	Length
1.	"Christmas Without You"	Brian Firkus	2:21
2.	"The Night Before Contact" (featuring Katya Zamolodchikova)	Firkus; Brian McCook; Disputed author	2:25
3.	"All I Want for Christmas Is Nudes"	Firkus; Mariah Carey; Walter Afanasieff	3:03
Total length:			7:49

Notes

- "The Night Before Contact" is a parody of the poem "A Visit from St. Nicholas", written either by Clement Clarke Moore or Henry Livingston Jr., based on the film Contact.
- "All I Want for Christmas Is Nudes" is a parody of "All I Want for Christmas Is You", written by Mariah Carey and Walter Afanasieff, and performed by Carey.
