= Now with Moving Parts Tour =

2018 tour by Trixie Mattel

Now with Moving Parts
- Tour by Trixie Mattel
- Associated album: One Stone
- Duration: 2018
- No. of shows: 55 in North America; 11 in the United Kingdom; 66 total

Trixie Mattel concert chronology
- Ages 3 & Up (2015-2017); Now with Moving Parts Tour (2018); Super Bowl Cut (2018)

The Now with Moving Parts Tour was the second tour by drag queen, musician and comedian Trixie Mattel. The tour would predate and later follow her win on the third season of RuPaul's Drag Race: All Stars.

The show mainly focused on stand-up, but also promoted Mattel's then-currently new album, One Stone.

== Critical reception ==
In a review for Provincetown Magazine, Steve Desroches wrote: "From her mind-blowing aesthetic to her ferocious comedic chops to her subtle and beautiful singing, Trixie Mattel is one to watch, not just on TV, but for any fan of live performance who is looking for something totally new and fresh."

== Tour dates ==
2018 dates
Date	Country	City
January 25	United Kingdom	London
January 26	United Kingdom	Dublin
January 27	United Kingdom	Liverpool
January 28	United Kingdom	Manchester
January 29	United Kingdom	Glasgow
January 31	United Kingdom	Falkirk
February 3	United Kingdom	Aberdeen
February 5	United Kingdom	Nottingham
February 6	United Kingdom	Nottingham
February 7	United Kingdom	Cardiff
February 9	United Kingdom	Dundee
April 20	United States	Fort Lauderdale
April 21	United States	Jacksonville
April 22	United States	Orlando
April 23	United States	Atlanta
April 25	United States	New Orleans
April 26	United States	Dallas
April 27	United States	Tulsa
April 28	United States	St. Louis
April 30	United States	Charlotte
May 1	United States	Richmond
May 3	United States	Washington D.C
May 4	United States	Cleveland
May 5	United States	New York City
May 7	United States	Columbus
May 8	United States	Chicago
May 9	United States	Milwaukee
May 10	United States	Minneapolis
May 16	United States	Boston
May 18	United States	Portland
May 19	United States	Hartford
May 21	United States	Grand Rapids
May 22	United States	Cincinnati
May 23	United States	Munhall
May 24	United States	Buffalo
June 12	United States	Seattle
June 13	United States	Portland
June 15	United States	Salt Lake City
June 16	United States	Las Vegas
June 17	United States	San Francisco
June 18	United States	San Diego
June 20	United States	Denver
June 21	United States	Albequerque
June 22	United States	Phoenix
June 23	United States	Los Angeles
June 27	United States	Kansas City
June 28	United States	Memphis
June 29	United States	Austin
June 30	United States	Houston
July 1	United States	San Antonio
July 18	Canada	Vancouver
July 20	Canada	Calgary
July 21	Canada	Edmonton
July 22	Canada	Saskatoon
July 23	Canada	Winnipeg
July 26	Canada	London
July 27	Canada	Toronto
July 28	Canada	Ottawa
July 29	Canada	Montreal
July 31	Canada	Burlington
