= Trixie Mattel =

American drag queen and musician (born 1989)

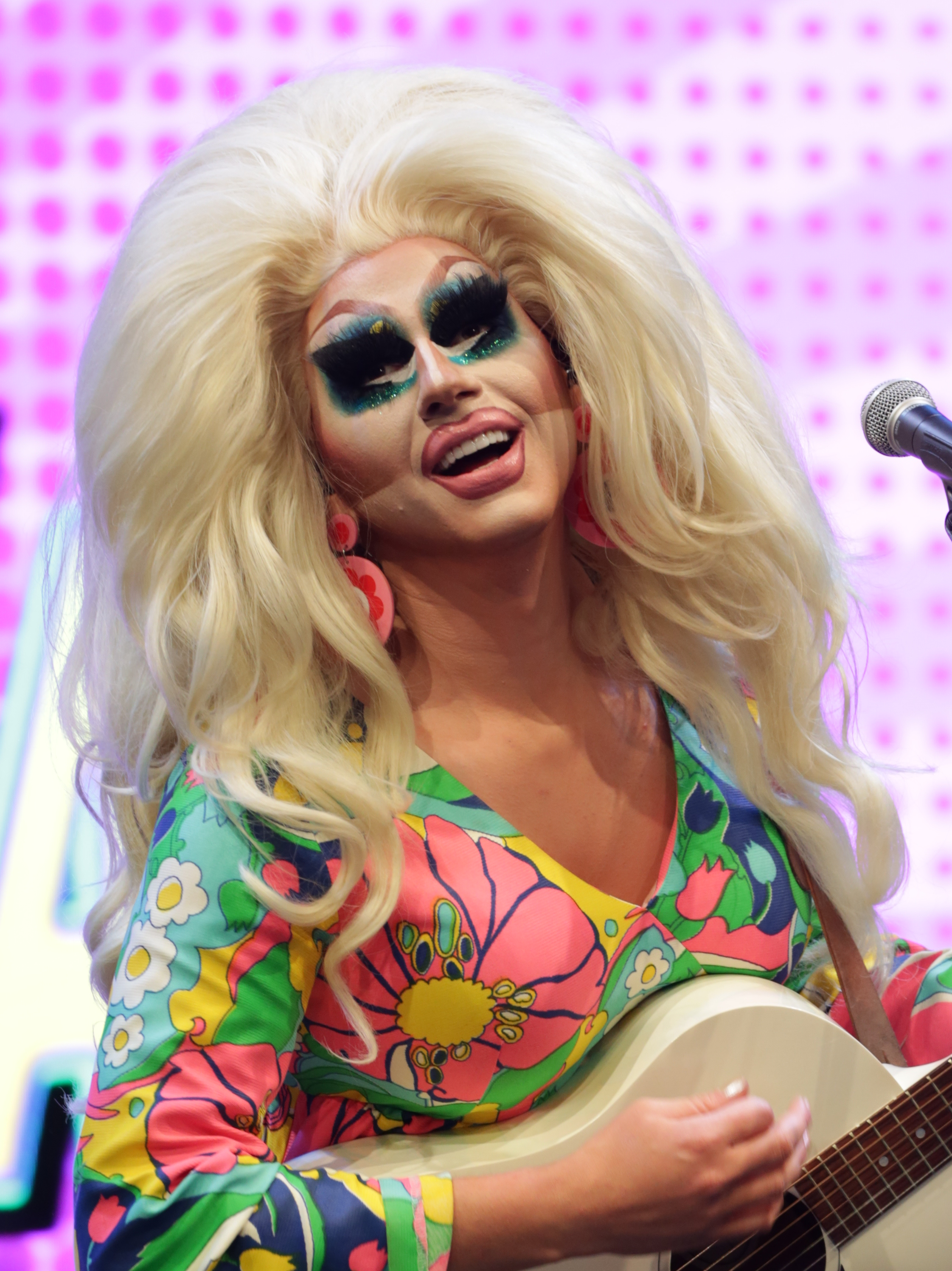
- Mattel performing in 2019
- Born: Brian Michael Firkus; August 23, 1989 (age 37); Milwaukee, Wisconsin, U.S.
- Education: University of Wisconsin–Milwaukee (BFA)
- Occupations: Drag queen; television personality; singer-songwriter; comedian; entrepreneur; DJ; YouTuber
- Years active: 2008–present
- Known for: RuPaul's Drag Race; RuPaul's Drag Race All Stars; UNHhhh; The Bald and the Beautiful; I Like to Watch
- Title: Founder and CEO of Trixie Cosmetics; Co-owner of Trixie Motel
- Musical career
- Genres: Country folk; Americana; folk; power pop; pop
- Instruments: Vocals; Guitar; Autoharp; Clarinet; Turntables
- Labels: Producer Entertainment Group; ATO Records

YouTube information
- Channel: Trixie Mattel
- Genres: Comedy; beauty; music; toys
- Subscribers: 2.41 million
- Views: 620.6 million
- Last updated: August 14, 2026
- Website: www.trixiemattel.com

Brian Michael Firkus (born August 23, 1989), better known by the stage name Trixie Mattel, is an American drag queen, television personality, singer-songwriter, DJ, and entrepreneur originally from Marinette County, Wisconsin. (Note: Mattel has variously cited origins in different Marinette County municipalities, including Wausaukee, Crivitz, and Silver Cliff.) She (Note: Mattel uses she/her pronouns while in drag, and he/him pronouns otherwise.) is known for her exaggerated, 1960s-influenced style, distinctive eye makeup, and musical repertoire that blends comedy with acoustic pop and folk-country music, with skills in guitar and the autoharp. In 2015, she competed in the seventh season of the drag reality television competition series RuPaul's Drag Race and returned to win the third season of RuPaul's Drag Race All Stars. Mattel has also made guest appearances in various iterations of the Drag Race franchise, additionally appearing as a judge on the spinoff series Queen of the Universe (2021–2023).

Mattel formed the popular comedy duo known as Trixie and Katya alongside fellow drag queen and frequent collaborator Katya Zamolodchikova. Together, they starred in the World of Wonder web series UNHhhh (2016–2023) and its Viceland spin-off The Trixie & Katya Show (2017–2018). The pair also host the Netflix review web series I Like to Watch (2019–present) and the podcast The Bald and the Beautiful (2020–present).

Mattel's music style began as primarily folk and country, with her first and second studio albums, Two Birds (2017) and One Stone (2018), both charting on the Billboard Folk Albums chart at No. 16. She went on to star in the documentary film Trixie Mattel: Moving Parts (2019). Her third studio album, Barbara (2020), featured an "electro-folk" sound, while her fourth studio album, The Blonde & Pink Albums (2022), was a double album featuring a "power pop" sound. Her musical comedy special, Trixie Mattel: One Night Only (2020), was nominated for a Critics' Choice Television Award. She also produced and starred in the renovation docuseries Trixie Motel (2022–2024), which chronicled the opening of her own Palm Springs resort of the same name.

Co-published with Zamolodchikova, Mattel's first book, Trixie and Katya's Guide to Modern Womanhood (2020), became a New York Times bestseller. She appeared on New York Magazine's list of "The Most Powerful Drag Queens in America", ranking fourth. She also operates a YouTube channel focused on beauty, featuring frequent collaborations with fellow drag queens and various celebrities such as Iggy Azalea, Nicole Byer, Brittany Broski, Rebecca Black and Margaret Cho. Mattel's business ventures include being the founder, sole owner and CEO of Trixie Cosmetics, a cosmetics brand launched in 2019. Her persona is inspired by her love of Barbie dolls; she owns a large collection of Barbies that she has shared in videos on her YouTube channel.

== Life and career ==
=== 1989–2014: Early life and career beginnings ===
Brian Michael Firkus was born on August 23, 1989, in Milwaukee, Wisconsin, and raised in Marinette County, Wisconsin. Firkus is Ojibwe; his maternal grandmother was a member of the Bad River Band of the Lake Superior Tribe of Chippewa Indians. He had an abusive stepfather who would call him a "Trixie" when he acted feminine, which later inspired his drag name. His last name was inspired by his affinity for the Barbie doll and toy company Mattel. Before deciding on "Trixie Mattel" as his drag name, he originally considered the name Cupcake. He moved in with his grandparents at age 15, after his stepfather threatened him with a gun to the head. His grandfather was a country musician who taught him how to play the guitar.

After graduating from high school, Firkus studied at the University of Wisconsin–Milwaukee (where Max Malanaphy, another season 7 contestant, attended and worked with Firkus) where he received a BFA in musical theatre and was introduced to drag while attending a screening of The Rocky Horror Picture Show at the Oriental Theatre. He first performed in drag at LaCage NiteClub in Milwaukee, becoming a regular performer in Milwaukee's drag scene. Firkus would perform with fellow drag queens Kim Chi and Shea Couleé in Milwaukee and occasionally in Chicago. He attended beauty school in 2014 before withdrawing to participate in RuPaul's Drag Race. Outside of drag, he worked in cosmetics, freelancing at Sephora and working at Ulta and MAC.

=== 2015–2017: RuPaul's Drag Race, UNHhhh, Two Birds, and The Trixie & Katya Show ===
Mattel first gained widespread attention as a competitor on the seventh season of RuPaul's Drag Race (2015). She was initially eliminated in episode four but later re-entered the competition in episode eight by winning the "Conjoined Twins" challenge with Pearl Liaison. Mattel was eliminated again in episode 10, ultimately placing sixth overall and becoming the first queen to last more than one episode after returning to the competition. Mattel, who is of Ojibwe descent, was the third Native American queen to compete on Drag Race. After her run on the show, Mattel performed her stand-up comedy tour, Ages 3 and Up, from 2015 to 2017.

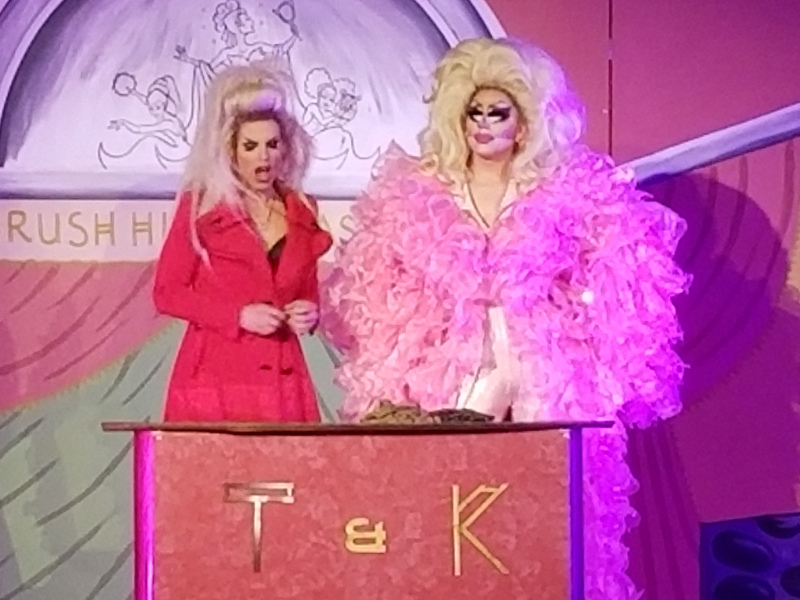
Trixie and Katya's High School Reunion in November 2017

In October 2015, Mattel guest-starred in a special edition of WOWPresents' Fashion Photo RuView with fellow seventh season contestant Katya Zamolodchikova. World of Wonder later launched UNHhhh, a comedy web series featuring the duo. The series became the most successful show on the WOW Presents YouTube channel and earned them their first Streamy Award nomination for Show of the Year at the 7th Streamy Awards. In November 2016, Mattel had a guest appearance as herself on American Horror Story: Roanoke. She self-released her debut studio album Two Birds on May 2, 2017. The album debuted at number 2 on the Heatseekers Albums chart, number 6 on the Independent Albums chart, and number 16 on the Americana/Folk Albums chart. In December 2017, Mattel released Homemade Christmas, an EP of three recorded Christmas songs that featured Zamolodchikova.

In October 2017, it was announced that UNHhhh would end after its second season. Shortly after, a television spin-off of UNHhhh for Viceland called The Trixie and Katya Show premiered. The show ran until March 2018. Midway through the season, Zamolodchikova suffered a mental health crisis triggered by a relapse into addiction, which caused her to be replaced by Bob the Drag Queen for the remainder of the season. Mattel and Zamolodchikova reunited in October 2018 for a third season of UNHhhh.

In November 2017, Mattel and Zamolodchikova starred in a drag stage adaptation of the 1997 cult film Romy and Michele's High School Reunion, titled Trixie and Katya's High School Reunion. Also in November 2017, Mattel produced a video for GQ Magazine called Trixie Mattel Makes a PB&J (and More Importantly, a Cocktail), earning a nomination from the James Beard Foundation Awards in the humor category.

=== 2018–2020: All Stars, One Stone, and Moving Parts ===
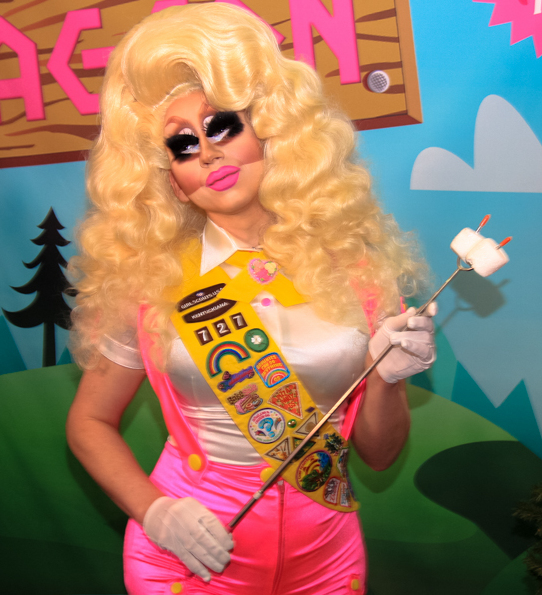
Mattel at RuPaul's DragCon LA in 2018

Mattel later returned to the Drag Race franchise for the third season of RuPaul's Drag Race: All Stars, which started airing on January 25, 2018. On March 15, 2018, her fellow competitors voted for her to advance to the final two, where she ultimately won against runner-up Kennedy Davenport in the final lipsync battle. She became the first winner of Drag Race to be of Indigenous descent. In December 2018, she competed in the television special RuPaul's Drag Race Holi-slay Spectacular and won in a tie with the other competitors.

On February 3, 2018, Mattel released an acoustic version of her song "Moving Parts," which is also the name of her documentary, as a tease for her upcoming album. It became her first charting single, peaking at number 83 on the Scottish Single Chart. She released her second studio album, One Stone, on March 15, 2018, the same night as the All Stars finale. The album peaked at number 16 on the Folk Albums chart, number 10 on the Independent albums chart, and number 1 on the Heatseekers chart, becoming Mattel's first album to reach the top spot on a Billboard chart. In April 2018, she launched her new comedy world tour Now with Moving Parts, followed by the Super Bowl Cut tour later that same year. A documentary film titled Trixie Mattel: Moving Parts premiered at the Tribeca Film Festival in April 2019 and screened until May 2019. It documents Mattel as she embarks on her "Moving Parts" tour following her All Stars win, as well as her personal struggles. The documentary was made available on Video On Demand platforms on December 3, 2019. An accompanying acoustic soundtrack was released later in December. Mattel's first comedy special, Trixie Mattel: Skinny Legend, aired on OutTV in Canada on September 26, 2019.

In a September 2018 interview with Billboard, she announced that she was working on her third studio album, Barbara, featuring an "electro-folk" sound. "Yellow Cloud" was released as the first single from the album on May 17, 2019, though it did not make the final cut. "Malibu" was released as the official first single on January 24, 2020, and the album was released a week later through Producer Entertainment Group and ATO Records. The album received a GLAAD Media Award nomination for Best Breakthrough Artist.

In January 2019, Mattel and Zamolodchikova launched the fourth season of UNHhhh. In June 2019, Mattel was one of 37 drag queens featured on the cover of New York magazine. The magazine ranked America's 100 most powerful drag queens and placed Mattel at number 4.

During the COVID-19 pandemic, filming of the fifth season of UNHhhh was put on hold. In its place, Mattel and Zamolodchikova launched Trixie and Katya Save the World, a spin-off filmed from their homes. Mattel also took the time to start building her YouTube channel, which previously featured make-up tutorials and music videos. She expanded the channel to include content reflecting her pastime as a toy collector, with videos reviewing new Barbie collections, discussing doll history, or baking with Easy-Bake Ovens. Mattel and Zamolodchikova resumed filming the fifth season of UNHhhh later in 2020 and launched their podcast The Bald and the Beautiful. On July 14, 2020, Mattel and Zamolodchikova released Trixie and Katya's Guide to Modern Womanhood, an affectionate parody of women's self-help books. The book was a New York Times best-seller.

In September 2020, Mattel released a cover of Lana Del Rey's "Video Games", which ranked 66 on the Scottish singles chart and 89 on the UK Downloads chart. In December 2020, Mattel and Zamolodchikova co-hosted the 10th Streamy Awards in Los Angeles. In the same ceremony, the duo was nominated for Show of the Year and Unscripted Series for UNHhhh, winning the latter category.

=== 2021–present: Full Coverage, Vol. 1, The Blonde & Pink Albums, Trixie Motel, and Working Girls ===
In February 2021, Mattel released a cover of the Violent Femmes track "Blister in the Sun." She also announced the EP Full Coverage, Vol. 1, which included both singles "Video Games" and "Blister in the Sun," as well as a cover of "Jackson" with Orville Peck. The EP was released on April 30, 2021.

In May 2021, Mattel announced that she would star in Trixie Motel, a reality series on Discovery+. The series would follow Mattel, her (at the time) partner David, and "famous" friends as they renovated a motel in Palm Springs. The renovations began in the fall of 2021, and the series premiered on June 3, 2022.

In August 2021, Mattel and Zamolodchikova launched their newsletter Gooped, which includes light-hearted advice. In November 2021, Mattel announced "The Trixie Doll," a collectible fashion doll in her likeness, in collaboration with Integrity Toys.

In September 2021, Producer Entertainment Group debuted a vodka line in collaboration with the Mexican distillery Casa Maestri. The line, titled Serv Vodka, consists of six flavors each inspired by a drag queen on the PEG roster: pink lemonade (Mattel); pineapple (Manila Luzon); mixed berries (Trinity the Tuck); blood orange (Sharon Needles); green apple (Monét X Change); and original unflavored (Alaska Thunderfuck 5000).

In December 2021, the drag queen singing competition Queen of the Universe premiered, featuring Mattel as one of the four judges. The second and final season, which premiered in June 2023, also featured Mattel on the judging panel.

On November 12, 2021, Mattel released the single "Hello Hello," loosely inspired by 60s power pop. The single's music video was choreographed by fellow drag race alumna Laganja Estranja. Joseph Longo of Them said: "With "Hello Hello," Mattel makes her case for pop star status — elaborate choreography, suave backup dancers, expressive makeup, and a sparkly mini-dress." The single "This Town" featuring Shakey Graves followed on January 28, 2022, along with the announcement of her fourth studio album, a double album called The Blonde & Pink Albums. The third single, "C'mon, Loretta," was released on April 15, 2022, with the full 14-track album following in June 2022.

In 2021, it was announced Mattel would co-star with Zamolodchikova in the dating show From Katya with Love to help her find a partner, although the series was ultimately not greenlit. On April 8, 2022, Entertainment Weekly (EW) announced the then-upcoming release of Trixie and Katya's second book, Working Girls: Trixie & Katya's Guide to Professional Womanhood. EW reported that the book includes "advice for people entering the modern workplace, including satirical tips for choosing a career path, navigating the 'Nine Circles of Retail Hell,' corporate culture, grappling with suspicions that your colleague 'doesn't really hope their emails finds you well,' and the inevitable sailing into one's retiree era." The book also included quizzes and an aptitude test.

In 2022 Mattel and Zamolodchikova toured the United States and Europe with Trixie and Katya Live, a scripted, theatrical show featuring Kelly Mantle and choreographed by Laganja Estranja.

In 2023, Mattel announced partnerships with Etsy, Maybelline, LinkedIn, and The Sims. Mattel was featured on the cover of the June 2023 edition of Los Angeles magazine. Also in June 2023, Mattel partnered with the online survival horror video game Dead by Daylight to co-host its annual into the Rainbow charity event with streamer Negaoryx in support of Pride Month and the It Gets Better Project. That same year, she made a guest appearance as Skelly Vonderbone in the Nickelodeon animated series Monster High.

Mattel began DJing during the 2020 COVID-19 lockdown and toured with the DJ set Solid Pink Disco from 2022 to 2025, including at Coachella 2025. She has posted remixes on her YouTube channel, including the Black Eyed Peas song "My Humps" in July 2023, and later Aqua's "Barbie Girl" and Megan Thee Stallion's "Her". Mattel began remixing songs by other artists for official release in 2025, with English singer-songwriter Paloma Faith releasing a Trixie Mattel remix of her 2023 single "Bad Woman". This continued in 2026, which saw officially-released remixes of Wolf Parade's "I'll Believe in Anything", Duran Duran's "Free To Love", and Jennifer Lopez's "Play", the latter being released as part of the 25th anniversary edition of Lopez's album "J.Lo".

In June 2024, a second season of the renovation reality series Trixie Motel premiered on Max, following the renovation of Mattel's own home. Mattel also guest starred as Shazam in the FX comedy series English Teacher.

In April 2025, Mattel released a cover of RuPaul's "Supermodel (You Better Work)" with Vincint, and performed it at Coachella.

Mattel hosted the 2026 Queerty Awards on March 10, 2026, in Los Angeles.

In March 2026, she announced a second DJ set, SuperDisco, which will tour music festivals in summer 2026.

== Business ventures ==
=== Trixie Cosmetics ===
On May 1, 2019, Mattel announced that she would be releasing her makeup brand, Trixie Cosmetics, later that month, and it would be available at RuPaul's DragCon LA on May 24, 2019. Mattel had previously dipped into the makeup industry with her Oh Honey! collaboration with independent makeup brand Sugarpill Cosmetics in 2018.

In 2020, Trixie Cosmetics launched a collaboration collection with Zamolodchikova called "Red Scare". The brand has also released collaboration collections with Juno Birch and Laganja Estranja.

=== This Is It! ===
In February 2021, Mattel announced that she had become co-owner of Wisconsin's oldest LGBTQ+ bar, This Is It!, located in Milwaukee.

This Is It! permanently closed in March 2025, citing the COVID-19 pandemic and street closures for its financial struggles.

=== Trixie Motel ===
Mattel and her then-partner David Silver bought a fixer-upper motel in Palm Springs, California, originally named Ruby Montana's Coral Sands Inn, for $1.9 million. Initially, she had planned to transform it into an Airbnb rental but changed her mind after viewing the property. Instead, Mattel decided to renovate the motel to reflect the aesthetics of her drag persona, enlisting designer Dani Dazey to collaborate on the project. The renovation process was the subject of the Discovery+ original docuseries Trixie Motel, which aired in 2022. In 2024, Mattel and Silver produced a spin-off series, Trixie Motel: Drag Me Home, which followed the renovation of their own home. At the conclusion of this 4-part series, Silver announced that he and Mattel planned to renovate another motel in the future.

== Artistry ==
Trixie singing a self-written song while playing guitar at the KC Tenants Yeehaw benefit variety show

In addition to her comedic drag persona, Mattel is also a country folk singer-songwriter. In an interview with Rolling Stone, Mattel recounted that her grandfather was a country singer who taught her how to begin playing guitar. But, growing up, she hated country music and thought it was "old people music." However, she grew to love and appreciate country as an adult, recognizing its depth, complexity, and humor with artists like June Carter Cash and Dolly Parton especially contributing to her newfound appreciation. Mattel also said that she learned guitar by listening to George Jones, Conway Twitty, and Johnny Cash. Although she learned to play country folk, the type of music she listened to on the radio was from country, Americana, and folk pop performers such as Patsy Cline, Jason Isbell, Kris Kristofferson, Aimee Mann, Michelle Branch, and Kacey Musgraves. Currently, Mattel finds that her music is inspired by Miley Cyrus and Kacey Musgraves, referring to them as "two fringe-country kindred spirits." Several of Mattel's influences for the finished version of her third studio album, Barbara, include new wave and rock groups The Go-Go's, Blondie, The B-52's, Fountains of Wayne, Weezer, Aimee Mann, and The Click Five.

== Personal life ==
Firkus is gay. He is a vegetarian, an atheist, and a collector of Barbie dolls. He was in a relationship with filmmaker David Silver, who also produced his documentary Moving Parts and co-owns Trixie Motel with Firkus, from 2016 to 2024. In December 2025 he announced that he has a boyfriend. In 2026, Firkus spoke about having ankylosing spondylitis.

== Filmography ==
=== Film ===
Year	Title	Role	Notes	Ref.
2019	Trixie Mattel: Moving Parts	Herself (in and out of drag)	Documentary	

=== Television ===
Year	Title	Role	Notes	Ref.
2015	RuPaul's Drag Race	Herself (contestant)	Season 7, 6th place	
2015	RuPaul's Drag Race: Untucked	Herself	Season 6	
2016	RuPaul's Drag Race	Herself (guest)	Season 8, Episode 10: "Grand Finale"	
2016	American Horror Story: Roanoke	Herself	Season 6, Episode 10: "Chapter 10"	
2016	Gay for Play Game Show Starring RuPaul	Herself	Season 1, Episode 5: "Featuring Mindy Cohn"; Season 2, Episode 2: "Featuring Frankie Grande"	
2017–2018	The Trixie & Katya Show	Herself (co-host)	14 episodes	
2018	RuPaul's Drag Race All Stars	Herself (contestant)	Season 3, Winner	
2018	RuPaul's Drag Race	Herself (guest)	Season 10, Episode 1: "10s Across The Board"	
2018	Super Drags	Champagne (voice)	English dub; Main role	
2018	Larry King Now	Herself	Guest	
2018	RuPaul's Drag Race Holi-slay Spectacular	Herself (contestant)	Joint Winner	
2019	RuPaul's Drag Race All Stars	Herself (guest)	Season 4, Episode 10: "Super Queen Grand Finale"	
2019	RuPaul's Drag Race	Herself (guest)	Season 11, Episode 5: "Monster Ball"	
2019	2019 MTV Movie & TV Awards	Herself (presenter)		
2019	Trixie Mattel: Skinny Legend	Herself	Television special	
2020	Brunch with Tiffany	Herself	Season 3, Episode 3: "Trixie Mattel"	
2020	RuPaul's Secret Celebrity Drag Race	Herself (mentor)	Season 1, Episode 1: "Secret Celebrity Edition #101"; Winner	
2020	Jonathan Van Ness: Kicks	Herself	Television special	
2020	Celebrity Call Center	Herself		
2021	Full Frontal with Samantha Bee	Herself	Season 6, Episode 2	
2021	Overserved with Lisa Vanderpump	Herself	Season 1, Episode 3: "Diva Tea: Iggy Azalea & Trixie Mattel"	
2021	Crank Yankers	Herself	Season 6, Episode 8: "Kathy Griffin, Trixie Mattel & Chelsea Peretti"	
2021	Call Me Mother	Herself	Season 1, Episode 6: "Out of the Darkness"	
2021	Sex: Unzipped	Herself	Documentary	
2021	The Boulet Brothers' Dragula	Herself (judge)	Season 4, Episode 3: "Weird, Wild, West"	
2021	Hear Me Out	Herself	Episode 4: "Trixie Mattel"	
2021	The Drew Barrymore Show	Herself	Season 2, Episode 57	
2021–2023	Queen of the Universe	Herself (judge)		
2022	Jimmy Kimmel Live!	Herself (in drag)		
2022	Entertainment Tonight	Herself (in drag)		
2022	Sketchy Queens	Herself (in drag)	Episode 1: "Symphony of Jennifers"	
2022	Dr. Jackie: Unlicensed Psychotherapist	Herself (in drag)	Season 1, Episode 1	
2022–2024	Trixie Motel	Herself (in and out of drag)	Discovery+ docuseries; also executive producer	
2023	Brother vs. Brother	Herself (in drag)	Season 8, Episode 4: "Garages to Guest Suites"	
2023	Monster High	Skelly Vonderbone	Episode 12: "Horoscare/Flaunt Your Skeleton"	
2023	Drag Isn't Dangerous	Herself (in drag)	Livestream telethon	
2023	Trixie & Katya Live: The Last Show	Herself (in drag)	Veeps special	
2023	Glow Up: Britain's Next Make-Up Star	Herself (in drag)	Guest judge; Series 5, Episode 6	
2023	The Real Housewives of Salt Lake City	Herself (in drag)	Episode: "Vacation Crashers", "All Tricks, No Trust" & "Don't Be a Drag"	
2023	A Very Demi Holiday Special	Herself (in drag)	Television special	
2024	The Kelly Clarkson Show	Herself (in drag)	Season 5, Episode 171	
2024	English Teacher	Shazam	Season 1, Episode 2: "Powderpuff"	
2026	The Comeback	Herself	Season 3, Episode 2: "Valerie Has a Secret"	

=== Web series ===
Year	Title	Role	Notes	Ref.
2015	Bestie$ for Ca$h	Herself	Episode: "Katya Zamo & Trixie Mattel"	
2015	Fashion Photo RuView	Herself	Episode: "RuView of Raja & Raven"	
2015, 2018	Whatcha Packin'	Herself	2 episodes	
2015, 2017, 2019	Hey Qween!	Herself	4 episodes	
2015	Transformations: with James St. James	Herself	Episode: "Trixie Mattel"	
2016	Hot T	Herself	2 episodes	
2016	Gay of Thrones	Herself	Season 6, Episode 4: "Thrust of the Stranger"	
2016–2024	UNHhhh	Herself (co-host)	8 seasons, 201 episodes with Katya Zamolodchikova	
2018	YouTube Rewind 2018	Herself		
2018–2024	The Pit Stop	Herself (host)	RuPaul's Drag Race All Stars (season 4); Canada's Drag Race (season 1); RuPaul's Drag Race (season 13); RuPaul's Drag Race All Stars (season 6); RuPaul's Drag Race (season 16); RuPaul's Drag Race All Stars (season 9)	
2019	The X Change Rate	Herself	Episode: "Trixie Mattel"	
2019–2021	That's Our Sally	Herself	Queerty Production	
2019–present	Trixie Cosmetics TV	Herself (host)	Trixie Mattel's YouTube channel	
2019–present	I Like to Watch	Herself (co-host)	Netflix YouTube show	
2020	Trixie Mattel: One Night Only	Herself	Musical comedy special	
2020	Trixie & Katya Save the World	Herself (co-host)		
2020	Gayme Show	Herself	Episode: "Respect Kirsten"	
2020	Instant Influencer	Herself	Guest judge	
2020	10th Annual Streamy Awards	Herself (co-host)		
2021	The Badass Questionnaire	Herself	Episode: "Trixie Mattel"	
2021	YouTube Pride 2021	Herself (co-host)		
2021	PsBattles Live	Herself	Episode 4	
2022	Behind the Shadows	Herself	Episode: "What's Guillermo's Drag Name? With Trixie Mattel"	
2022	Stand Out: An LGBTQ+ Celebration	Herself	Netflix special	
2023	Walk In	Herself	Episode: "The Story Behind Trixie Mattel's Most Iconic Wig"	
2024	Awards for Excellence in Audio	Herself (hostess)		
2024	Tammie Talks	Herself	Episode: "Trixie Mattel on Tammie Talks"	
2025	Last Meals	Herself	Episode: Trixie Mattel Eats Her Last Meal	
2025	Royal Court	Herself	Episode: Trixie Mattel Joins Brittany Broski's Royal Court	
2025	The Kelly Mantle Show	Herself	Episode: Trixie Mattel and Kelly Mantle Get Woo Woo on the Kelly Mantle Show!	
2025	Sloppy Seconds	Herself	Episode: Huge If True (w/ Trixie Mattel)	
2025	Lovett or Leave It	Herself	Trixie Mattel: She Wouldn't Survive On Drag Race Now, DJing For Chappell Roan & Cynthia Erivo Flub	
2026	The Queerties	Herself (host)	WOWPresents+ special	
2026	Takes Us Out	Herself	Trixie Mattel Opens Up About Breaking Music Industry Rules & DJ Life Over Donuts	

=== Music Videos ===
Year	Title	Artist(s)	Ref.
2016	The T	Alaska Thunderfuck ft. Adore Delano	
2017	Mama Don't Make Me Put on the Dress Again	Trixie Mattel	
2018	Break Your Heart	Trixie Mattel	
2018	Aileen	Willam	
2019	Started	Iggy Azalea	
2019	Yellow Cloud	Trixie Mattel	
2020	Jesse Jesse	Trixie Mattel	
2020	Gold	Trixie Mattel	
2020	Malibu	Trixie Mattel	
2020	Stranger	Trixie Mattel ft. Lavender Country	
2020	Video Games	Trixie Mattel	
2020	Ding Dong!	Katya ft. Trixie Mattel	
2021	Blister in the Sun	Trixie Mattel	
2021	Jackson	Trixie Mattel ft. Orville Peck	
2021	Hello Hello	Trixie Mattel	
2022	This Town	Trixie Mattel ft. Shakey Graves	
2022	White Rabbit	Trixie Mattel ft. Michelle Branch	
2022	C'mon Loretta	Trixie Mattel	
2023	Looking Good, Feeling Gorgeous	Trixie Mattel	

=== Podcasts ===
Year	Title	Notes	Ref.
2019	The Savage Situation Podcast	Episode: "Trixie Mattel"	
2020–present	The Bald and the Beautiful	Cohost	
2020	Bright Minded	Episode 5	
2020	Not Too Deep		
2021	All Things Vanderpump	Episode: "Trixie Mattel, Drag Race, and a Shocking Arrest!"	
2021	Whiskey Ginger	Episode: "Trixie Mattel"	
2021	Good for You	Episode: "Trixie Mattel"	
2021	Werkin' Girls	Episode: "Trixie Mattel Cracked an Egg on Ginger's Face"	
2022	The Comment Section	Episode: "This B*tch Came Bald"	
2023	BFFs	Episode: "Trixie Mattel Rates the BFFs of Drag"	
2023	The Leah McSweeney Show	Episode: "Trixie Mattel: Drag Queens DON'T WANT Your Children"	
2023	Very Delta	Episode: "Are You Trixie Mattel Like Me?"	
2023	I've Had It	Episode: "Death is a Total Racket with Trixie Mattel"	
2024	Scam Goddess	Episode: "Fraud Fridays: The Flexing Fraudster w/ Trixie Mattel"	
2024	Gayotic with MUNA	Episode: "Lesbian Book Club with Trixie Mattel"	
2024	So True with Caleb Hearon	Episodes: "Trixie Mattel is Lazy Barbie" and "Trixie Mattel Returns"	
2024	Good Children	Episode: "Trixie Mattel on Childhood, Coming Out, & Dating Drag Queens"	
2024	Zach Sang Show	Episode: "Trixie Mattel: Drag Queens, RuPaul, Brittany Broski"	
2024	Artist Friendly	Episode: "Trixie Mattel"	
2024	The Pink House with Sam Smith	Episode: "In the Playroom with Trixie Mattel"	
2025	The Comment Section with Drew Afualo	Episode: "Psychic But Stupid ft. Trixie Mattel"	
2025	Sloppy Seconds	Episode: "Huge if True (w/ Trixie Mattel)"	
2025	Monet Talks	Episode: "Trixie Mattel Talks Sending Nudes and Fake Names for Hookups"	
2025	Baby, This is Keke Palmer	Episode: "Turing Shade Into Shine with Trixie Mattel"	
2026	Unfamous	Episode: "If the Wig Stays On, the Zipper Closes, + No One Cries, It's No Accident. It's Fena."	
2026	The Sam Sanders Show	Episode: "When Being Trixie Mattel Became Too Much"	
2026	Only Child with Bob the Drag Queen	Episode: "Trixie Mattel on Being Bald, Katya, and THAT Drag Race Moment"	
2026	So True with Caleb Hearon	Episode: "Trixie Mattel Returns Again"	
2026	Why Won't You Date Me? with Nicole Byer	Episode: "Trixie Mattel's Strict Dating Rules"	
2026	Soft Serve with Eliot Glazer & H. Alan Scott	Episode: "Trixie Mattel Serves Softly"	
2026	Wild Card with Rachel Martin	Episode: "Trixie Mattel had her first panic attack on RuPaul's Drag Race"	
2026	Manboynice	Episode: "Making Trixie's Halloween Mattelathon & Why Limitations Breed Creativity"	

== Discography ==
- Two Birds (2017)
- One Stone (2018)
- Barbara (2020)
- The Blonde & Pink Albums (2022)

== Tours ==
=== Headlining tours ===
- Ages 3 and Up (2015–2017)
- Now with Moving Parts Tour (2018)
- Super Bowl Cut (2018)
- Skinny Legend Tour (2019)
- Grown Up Tour (2020–2022)
- Solid Pink Disco Tour (2022–2025)
- SuperDisco (2026)

=== Co-headlining tours ===
- Trixie and Katya Live! (with Katya) (2022–2023)
- The Bald and the Beautiful Tour (with Katya) (2022–2026)

=== Opening act ===
- Girls Just Wanna Have Fun Farewell Tour (Cyndi Lauper) (2024)

== Bibliography ==
- Trixie and Katya's Guide to Modern Womanhood. Plume. 2020. ISBN 9780593086704.
- Working Girls: Trixie and Katya's Guide to Professional Womanhood. Plume. 2022. ISBN 9780593186114.

== Awards and nominations ==
=== Queerty Awards ===
Year	Award	Nominated work	Result	Ref.
2018	Rising Diva	Herself	Won	
2020	Drag Royalty	Herself	Nominated	
2020	Documentary	Trixie Mattel: Moving Parts	Won	
2020	Indie Music Video	"Yellow Cloud"	Won	
2021	Indie Music Video	"Malibu"	Won	
2021	Podcast	The Bald and the Beautiful	Won	
2022	Podcast	The Bald and the Beautiful	Runner-up	
2022	Indie Music Video	"Hello Hello"	Won	
2022	Standout Stand-Up	Herself	Runner-up	
2023	Best Read	Working Girls: Trixie and Katya's Guide to Professional Womanhood	Won	
2023	Music Video	"C'mon Loretta"	Nominated	
2024	Music Video	"Looking Good, Feeling Gorgeous"	Runner-up	
2024	Web Series	UNHhhh	Runner-up	

=== Streamy Awards ===
Year	Award	Nominated work	Result	Ref.
2017	Show of the Year	UNHhhh	Nominated	
2019	Unscripted Series	UNHhhh	Nominated	
2020	Unscripted Series	UNHhhh	Won	
2020	Show of the Year	UNHhhh	Nominated	
2021	Show of the Year	UNHhhh	Nominated	
2021	Unscripted Series	UNHhhh	Nominated	
2022	Unscripted Series	UNHhhh	Nominated	
2022	Editing	UNHhhh	Nominated	
2022	Show of the Year	UNHhhh	Nominated	
2023	Show of the Year	UNHhhh	Nominated	

=== Webby Awards ===
Year	Award	Nominated work	Result	Ref.
Webby Awards
2022	Podcasts, Best Podcast Ad	The Bald and the Beautiful with Trixie and Katya	Won	
2022	Video, Variety & Reality	"Office Tour (WARNING: ICONIC)"	Won	
2024	Video, Fashion, Beauty & Lifestyle	"Trixie Recreates her S7 finale look"	Honoree	
2024	Video, Best Creator, Personality or Host	"Trixie Gets Ready and Gets PERSONAL at The Trixie Motel"	Honoree	
2024	Podcasts, Comedy	The Bald and the Beautiful with Trixie and Katya	Won	
2025	Podcasts, Comedy	The Bald and the Beautiful with Trixie and Katya	Won	
People's Voice
2022	Podcasts, Best Podcast Ad	The Bald and the Beautiful	Won	
2022	Video, Variety & Reality	"Office Tour (WARNING: ICONIC)"	Won	
2022	Social, Arts & Entertainment (Video)	I Like To Watch	Won	
2023	Social, Television & Film (Video)	I Like To Watch	Won	
2023	Video, Fashion, Beauty & Lifestyle	"Trixie Mattel Transforms into Dr. Manhattan"	Won	
2025	Video & Film, Interview or Talk Show (People's Voice)	RuPaul's Drag Race - The Pit Stop with Trixie Mattel	Won	
2025	Creators, Best Dance & Performance (People's Voice)	Herself	Won	

=== WOWIE Awards ===
Year	Award	Nominated work	Result	Ref.
2017	Best Drag Queen Music Video	"Mama Don't Make Me Put on the Dress Again"	Won (Note: tied with Adore Delano for "Negative Nancy" and Alaska Thunderfuck for "Come to Brazil".)	
2018	Best Drag Music Video	"Break Your Heart"	Won	
2019	Best Documentary	Trixie Mattel: Moving Parts	Won	
2019	Best Beauty Line	Trixie Cosmetics	Won	
2020	Outstanding Album or EP	Barbara	Nominated	
2020	Outstanding Palette	Trixie Cosmetics' Summer of Love Palette	Won	
2022	Best Beauty Line	Trixie Cosmetics	Won	

=== Miscellaneous awards and honors ===
Year	Organization	Award	Nominated work	Result	Ref.
2018	James Beard Foundation Journalism Award	Humor	"Trixie Mattel Makes a PB&J (and More Importantly, a Cocktail)"	Nominated	
2019	iHeartRadio Music Award	Social Star Award	Herself	Nominated	
2021	Canadian Podcast Awards	Outstanding Foreign Series	The Bald and the Beautiful	Won	
2021	GLAAD Media Awards	Outstanding Breakthrough Artist	Barbara	Nominated	
2021	American Influencer Awards	Drag Influencer of the Year	Herself	Won	
2022	Critics' Choice Television Awards	Best Comedy Special	Trixie Mattel: One Night Only	Nominated	
2023	Signal Awards	Best Video Podcast	The Bald and the Beautiful	Bronze	
2023	Signal Awards	Best Co-Host Team	The Bald and the Beautiful	Gold	
2023	Signal Awards	Best "Stan" Podcast	The Bald and the Beautiful	Silver	
2023	Signal Awards	Best LGBTQ+ Podcast	The Bald and the Beautiful	Silver	
2023	Shorty Awards	Comedy Podcast	The Bald and the Beautiful	Audience Honor	
2023	GLAAD Media Awards	Outstanding Reality Program	Trixie Motel	Nominated	
2023	GLAAD Media Awards	Outstanding Podcast	The Bald & The Beautiful	Nominated	
2026	GLAAD Media Awards	Outstanding Podcast	The Bald & The Beautiful	Pending	

== See also ==
- LGBTQ representation in country music

== Notes ==
Preceded by Alaska	Winner of RuPaul's Drag Race All Stars; US All Stars 3	Succeeded by Monét X Change; Trinity the Tuck
