= Barbara (Trixie Mattel album) =

Studio album by Trixie Mattel
- Released: February 7, 2020
- Genre: Electro-folk; power pop; surf rock
- Length: 23:42
- Label: Producer Entertainment Group; ATO
- Producer: Nick Goldston; Ryan Aceto; Tomas Costanza

Trixie Mattel chronology
Trixie Mattel: Moving Parts (The Acoustic Soundtrack) (2019)	Barbara (2020)	Full Coverage, Vol. 1 (2021)

Singles from Barbara
- 1. "Malibu" Released: January 24, 2020; 2. "Stranger" Released: June 12, 2020

Barbara is the third album by American drag queen, comedian, and singer-songwriter Trixie Mattel. It was released on February 7, 2020, through Producer Entertainment Group and ATO Records, and is Mattel's first studio album released through a record label. The album's title is a reference to the first name of the fashion doll Barbie, from which Mattel takes much of her inspiration.

== Background and promotion ==
In a September 2018 interview with Billboard, Mattel announced that she was working on her third studio album entitled Barbara and that it would feature an "electro-folk" sound. "Yellow Cloud" was released as the first single from the album on May 17, 2019, though it was later revealed to be a non-album single.

On January 10, 2020, the album's release date was confirmed for February 7, 2020, alongside the album tracklist. She also said the album would be "in the vein of artists like The Beach Boys, The Ventures, and... maybe even a little bit of Blondie." It was also revealed to be a double album, with the first side being focused more on the new surf rock style and the second half focusing more on Mattel's "classic Americana stylings" The album features a cover of Lavender Country's "I Can't Shake the Stranger Out of You" (recorded here as simply "Stranger"), as well as "Jesse Jesse", a love song in tribute of actor Jesse Eisenberg.

Barbara was made available for pre-order, and the lead single, "Malibu" was released, on January 24, 2020. Several of Mattel's influences for the finished version of Barbara include The Go-Go's, Blondie, The B-52's, Fountains of Wayne, Weezer, Aimee Mann, and The Click Five.

On January 28, 2020, Mattel premiered a new comedy special, Trixie Mattel: One Night Only on her YouTube channel. In the half hour special she performs the songs "Jesse Jesse", "Gold", and "Malibu" in her living room in front of her vast collection of dolls. The special went on to be nominated for the Critics' Choice Television Award for Best Comedy Special at the 2022 ceremony.

A new version of "Stranger" featuring Patrick Haggerty from Lavender Country, the original singers of the song, was released as a single on June 12, 2020, as Mattel announced earlier on her platforms.

== Composition ==
Barbara is primarily an electro-folk, power pop, and surf rock album, heavily inspired 1960s pop and dance music. "Malibu" is a Sheryl Crow-esque guitar-pop song, and "We Got the Look" is a new wave and pop rock track about "being glammed up and hitting the streets". The album's last half consists of country songs that "clearly show her home-roots haven’t gone away".

== Reception ==
=== Critical response ===
Professional ratings
Review scores
Source	Rating
Metro Weekly	4/5 stars

Writing for American Songwriter, Jason Scott said that Barbara "pairs the original vision of Trixie with a more mature, more playful, and wittier songwriting sheen", producing "an absolute blowout of beachside boogies, delightfully esoteric songwriting bits, and burning guitar confessions" and a tracklist which is "not only intensely personal but exuberant, fresh, and universal". Hank Adams of Country Queer commented that "Barbara is a thicker album than you might think if you only tune into the dancier tracks. But as it progresses, it moves from light to dusk into the evening, from first blushing love to wherever we end up after we’ve been tossed around by romance a time or two… or three. More thoughtful than she was when we initially met her, Mattel guides us through Barbara's story with a deft touch." Sean Maunier of Metro Weekly wrote that Barbara is "her most quintessentially "Trixie Mattel" album yet", stating that Mattel's songwriting "has lost none of its humor, heart, or depth" despite a change in sound from Two Birds and One Stone. Summing up the record, Maunier concluded that "Trixie Mattel’s great strength as a musician is her ability to marry a deeply irreverent comedic sensibility with a clear respect for the people and places from which she has drawn inspiration".

=== Accolades ===
Accolades for Barbara
Year	Award	Category	Work	Result	Ref.
2020	WOWIE Awards	Outstanding Album or EP	Barbara	Nominated	
2021	GLAAD Media Awards	Outstanding Breakthrough Artist	Barbara	Nominated	
2021	Queerty Awards	Indie Music Video	"Malibu"	Won	

== Track listing ==
Disc 1
No.	Title	Writer(s)	Producer(s)	Length
1.	"Malibu"	Brian Firkus; Nick Goldston	Ryan Aceto; Goldston	3:02
2.	"We Got the Look"	Tomas Costanza; Ashley Gordon	Aceto; Costanza	2:22
3.	"Girl Next Door"	Firkus; Goldston	Aceto; Goldston	2:33
4.	"Jesse Jesse"	Firkus	Aceto; Goldston	3:22

Disc 2
No.	Title	Writer(s)	Producer(s)	Length
1.	"Gold"	Firkus	Aceto; Goldston	3:04
2.	"I Don't Have a Broken Heart"	Firkus	Aceto; Goldston	2:49
3.	"I Do Like You"	Firkus	Aceto; Goldston	3:16
4.	"Stranger" (Lavender Country cover)	Patrick Haggerty; Robert Hammerstrom	Aceto; Goldston	3:14

== Charts ==
Chart performance for Barbara
Chart (2020)	Peak position
Australian Digital Albums (ARIA)	21
UK Download Albums (OCC)	34
UK Indie Album Breakers (OCC)	16
US Top Current Album Sales (Billboard)	66
