= Two Birds (album) =

Studio album by Trixie Mattel
- Released: May 2, 2017
- Genre: Country; folk
- Length: 21:56
- Producer: Brandon James Gwinn

Trixie Mattel chronology
Greener (2009)	Two Birds (2017)	Homemade Christmas (2017)

Singles from Two Birds
- 1. "Mama Don't Make Me Put on the Dress Again" Released: April 28, 2017

Two Birds is the debut studio album by American drag queen, actor, and singer Trixie Mattel, released in 2017.

== Track listing ==
All tracks are written by Trixie Mattel.

Two Birds track listing
No.	Title	Length
1.	"Mama Don't Make Me Put on the Dress Again"	2:58
2.	"Make Up Your Mind"	3:15
3.	"I Know You All over Again"	2:56
4.	"Seen My Man"	3:13
5.	"I'll Wear Your Ring"	4:03
6.	"Bluegrass"	3:58
7.	"Seen My Man" (Wisconsin demo; live)	2:55

== Charts ==
Chart performance for Two Birds
Chart (2017)	Peak position
UK Country Albums (OCC)	5
UK Independent Albums (OCC)	5
US Americana/Folk Albums (Billboard)	16
US Heatseekers Albums (Billboard)	2
US Independent Albums (Billboard)	6
US Top Album Sales (Billboard)	68
US Top Current Albums (Billboard)	57
