= Full Coverage, Vol. 1 =

2021 EP by Trixie Mattel

EP by Trixie Mattel
- Released: April 30, 2021
- Length: 11:43
- Label: Producer Entertainment Group
- Producer: Nick Goldston; Ryan Aceto; Tomas Costanza

Trixie Mattel chronology
Barbara (2020)	Full Coverage, Vol. 1 (2021)	The Blonde & Pink Albums (2022)

Singles from Full Coverage, Vol. 1
- 1. "Video Games" Released: September 18, 2020; 2. "Blister in the Sun" Released: February 5, 2021; 3. "Jackson" Released: April 30, 2021

Full Coverage, Vol. 1 is an extended play (EP) by Trixie Mattel, released on April 30, 2021. The four-track collection includes cover versions of songs by Lana Del Rey, Violent Femmes, Cher, and Johnny Cash. Orville Peck is featured on the duet "Jackson".

== Composition ==
The EP opens with a cover of Lana Del Rey's "Video Games". "Blister in the Sun" by American rock band Violent Femmes is the second track. The final two tracks are renditions of Cher's "Believe" and "Jackson", a collaboration featuring country singer Orville Peck. Peck also provided background vocals on "Video Games" in the form of whistling.

== Release and promotion ==
"Video Games" and "Blister in the Sun" had been issued as singles in September 2020 and February 2021 respectively prior to the release of the extended play, with both singles also receiving music videos. The EP was released on April 30, 2021, with a music video for the third single "Jackson" being released on the same day. Trixie Mattel had previewed "Jackson" on Instagram on April 19.

== Critical reception ==
Tyler Maas of the Milwaukee Record said Trixie Mattel's version of "Video Games" is "excellent and true-to-album". He called "Blister in the Sun" a "rousing rendition" and said "Jackson" "bring[s] the EP home in grand fashion". Tony Madden of Traklife Music commented that "the original songs vary greatly in nearly every respect; each one hails from a different decade, genre and artist. But Mattel brings the tracks together as cohesively as ever with a smooth tenor voice and an array of acoustic instruments", calling the EP "a testament to her versatility".

== Track listing ==
Full Coverage, Vol. 1 track listing
No.	Title	Writer(s)	Producer(s)	Length
1.	"Video Games"	Elizabeth Grant; Justin Parker	Nick Goldston; Ryan Aceto	3:45
2.	"Blister in the Sun"	Gordon Gano	Tomas Costanza	2:28
3.	"Believe"	Brian Higgins; Stuart McLennen; Paul Barry; Steven Torch; Matthew Gray; Timothy Powell	Goldston	2:53
4.	"Jackson" (featuring Orville Peck)	Billy Edd Wheeler; Jerry Leiber	Goldston	2:37
Total length:				11:43
