= Trixie Mattel: Moving Parts =

- Directed by: Nick Zeig-Owens
- Produced by: David Silver
- Starring: Trixie Mattel
- Cinematography: Nick Zeig-Owens
- Edited by: James Codoyannis
- Production company: World of Wonder
- Release dates: April 25, 2019 (Tribeca Film Festival); December 3, 2019 (Video on demand (worldwide))
- Running time: 91 minutes
- Country: United States
- Language: English

Trixie Mattel: Moving Parts is a documentary film starring drag queen and singer-songwriter Trixie Mattel. It was directed by Nick Zeig-Owens and produced by David Silver, and premiered at the Tribeca Film Festival on April 25, 2019. Following screenings, Mattel performed several songs on stage. The documentary was made available on video on demand platforms on December 3, 2019.

== Synopsis ==
The film follows Mattel's rise to fame and subsequent country music career, as well as life after her win of season three of RuPaul's Drag Race All Stars, including the struggles of performing and touring.

== Reception ==
On Rotten Tomatoes the film has an approval rating of 90% based on reviews from 10 critics, with an average rating of 6.3/10.

=== Awards and nominations ===
Year	Award	Category	Result	Ref.
2019	WOWIE Awards	Best Documentary	Won	
2020	Queerty Awards	Documentary	Won	

== Soundtrack ==
Trixie Mattel: Moving Parts (The Acoustic Soundtrack)

EP / Soundtrack album by Trixie Mattel
- Released: December 20, 2019
- Length: 15:57
- Label: Producer Entertainment Group

Trixie Mattel chronology
One Stone (2018)	Trixie Mattel: Moving Parts (The Acoustic Soundtrack) (2019)	Barbara (2020)

Trixie Mattel: Moving Parts (The Acoustic Soundtrack) is the accompanying the soundtrack extended play for the film, released on December 20, 2019. It features both original songs and covers performed in one take by Mattel on guitar, and includes new acoustic versions of the title song as well as the cast version of "Kitty Girl" performed on the finale of RuPaul's Drag Race All Stars season 3. The song "Hello, Goodbye, Hello" is originally from Firkus' 2009 EP Greener.

No.	Title	Writer(s)	Length
1.	"Moving Parts" (Guitar version)	Brian Firkus	2:57
2.	"Backwoods Barbie"	Dolly Parton	2:29
3.	"Heavy Crown"	Firkus	2:19
4.	"Hello, Goodbye, Hello"	Firkus	3:02
5.	"Keep on the Sunny Side"	Ada Blenkhorn; J. Howard Entwisle	2:52
6.	"Kitty Girl" (AS3 version)	RuPaul Charles; Mark Byers; Reuben Asberry Jr.; Darius Jeremy Pierce; Nea Marshall Kudi Ngwa; Firkus	2:18
