= This Is It! (bar) =

Gay bar in Milwaukee, Wisconsin, U.S.

Coordinates: 43.041494°N 87.906021°W

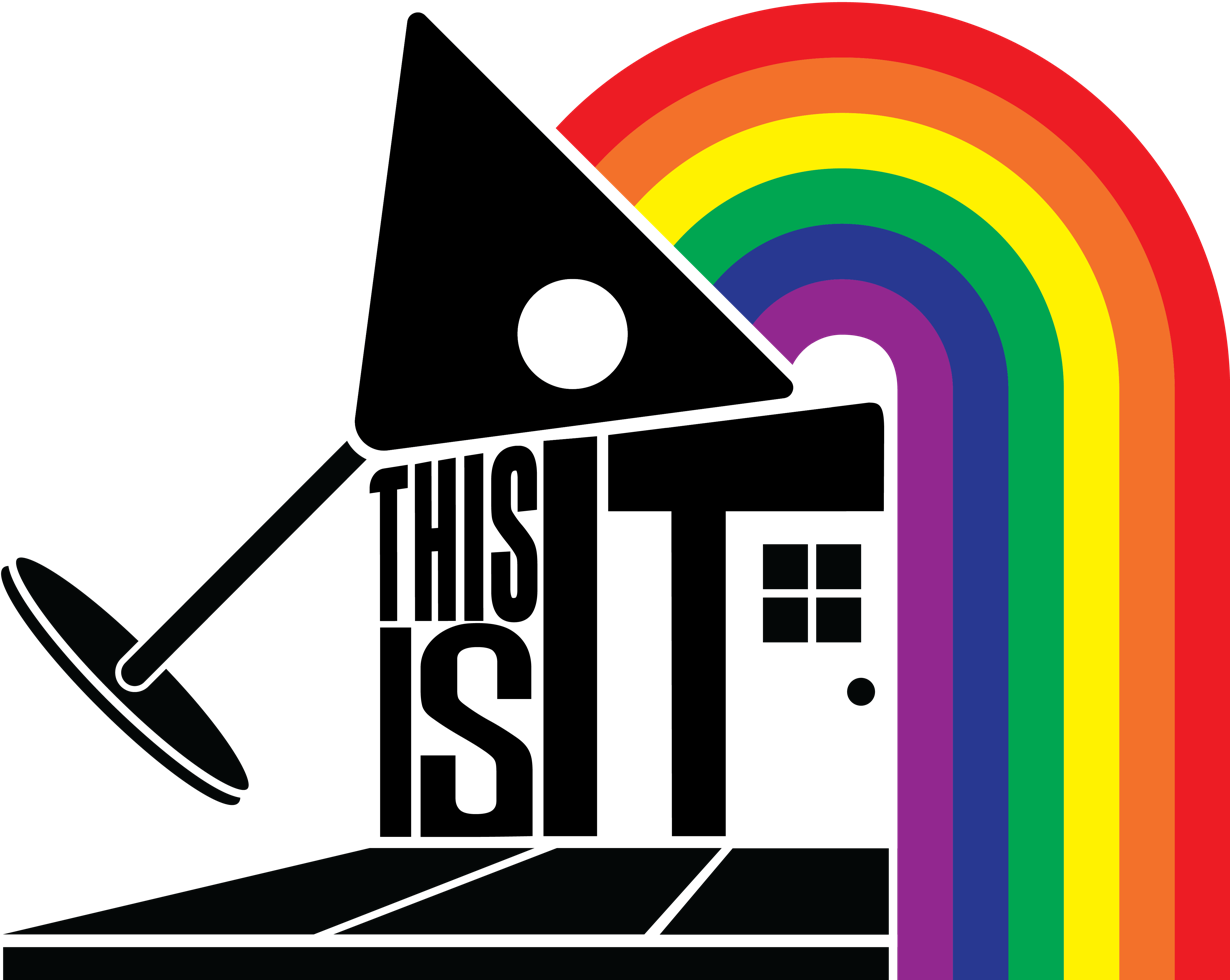
- Logo for This Is It, Inc., as of 2016
- Type: Gay bar
- Founded: 1968
- Founder: Catherine Brehm
- Defunct: 2025
- Headquarters: Milwaukee, WI
- Owners: George Schneider, Trixie Mattel
- Website: thisisitbar.com

This Is It!, also known locally as Tits, was a gay bar and lounge located in Milwaukee. Prior to its closure in March 2025, it was the oldest continually operating gay bar in the state of Wisconsin.

Located on the corner of Jefferson and Wells streets, in a building constructed in 1915, the space had served as a bar and tavern since 1936.

== History ==
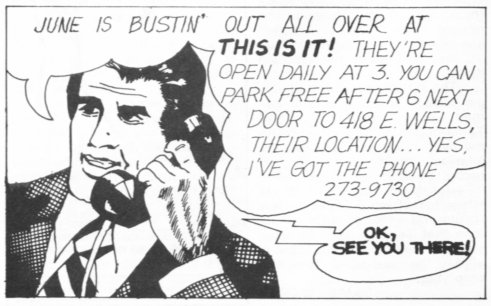
May 1973 advertisement, GPU News

The location, previously operating as "The Establishment" and "Vern's Tap", became a gay bar in 1968, operated by Catherine "June" Brehm and business partner Michael Latona. Extensive remodels were done in 1969, and June assumed full control of This Is It! in 1970. The owner's son Joseph Brehm became a part-owner after his mother suffered a stroke in 1981, and the two operated the bar until her death in 2010. After managing the bar at This Is It!, George Schneider became a part-owner in 2012.

The Milwaukee location remained the same since the bar's inception. The bar had never "shut down" or "closed its doors" for any period of time outside of normal maintenance and repairs. It was the oldest, continually operating gay bar in the State of Wisconsin.

Joseph Brehm died on April 3, 2016, from complications associated with ALS leaving full control of the establishment to his business partner, George Schneider. Schneider continued to operate the bar in the tradition of Joe and June, saying "Joe and June had this bar for the first 50 years, or almost 50. I'm the custodian of a huge amount of history and their legacy. I will make sure it keeps on going for another 50."

The adjacent restaurant to the bar, Louise's, closed its doors in August 2018. Schneider was able to acquire and additional 1200 sq. ft. of space previously used as a private dining room for Louise's, and began construction on an expansion project in September 2018. The project not only doubled the venue's overall size and capacity, it also added a new "show bar", dance floor, and performance space with a removable, modular stage. The addition opened to the public for the first time the evening of January 11, 2019, with a grand opening hosted on January 17, 2019.

After remodeling and adding the new performance space, the bar was able to obtain a Center for Visual and Performing Arts license from the City of Milwaukee, allowing the bar to host 18+ patrons on select nights. The license allowed the bar to host a safe place for 18+ patrons and is the only LGBT+ bar in Milwaukee to host 18+ nights and events. In order to obtain this license, the bar worked in conjunction with The Wisconsin LGBTQ History Project to install historical panels highlighting the history of the gay bar scene in Milwaukee. This installation not only satisfied the qualifications to obtain the license, but also created an opportunity for patrons of all ages to learn the history of the LGBT+ bar scene in their city.

In February 2021, it was announced that drag queen Trixie Mattel (Brian Firkus) had joined Schneider as co-owner of This is It!. A Wisconsin native, Trixie had previously hosted shows at This Is It!

On March 9, 2025, the bar announced via Facebook that their doors had closed permanently due to the impact of COVID and 2024 street construction.

== Recognition ==
Letter from Senator Tammy Baldwin

This Is it! has been voted 'BEST Gay and Lesbian Bar' since 2012 via the A-List on WISN.com (A-list not compiled in 2015).

This Is It! was featured in the book Bottoms Up: A Toast to Wisconsin's Historic Bars & Breweries by Jim Draeger & Mark Speltz, published by the Wisconsin Historical Society Press. The bar was also included in the 2019 publication 111 Places to Visit in Milwaukee That You Must Not Miss by Michelle Madden. The Madden publication is the first to highlight the bar's expansion of 2018-2019.

In March 2016, Joseph and June Brehm, as well as the bar itself, were recognized for their contributions to the LGBT community by Senator Tammy Baldwin. A copy of this letter is embedded in this article.

Just prior to Joseph Brehm's death, Milwaukee's mayor, Tom Barrett, proclaimed Thursday, March 31, 2016 "Joe Brehm Day", recognizing not only June Brehm's and Joseph Brehm's LGBT community involvement, but also the bar's significance as "a place that welcomes members of the LGBT community into a place of acceptance and safety" since 1968.

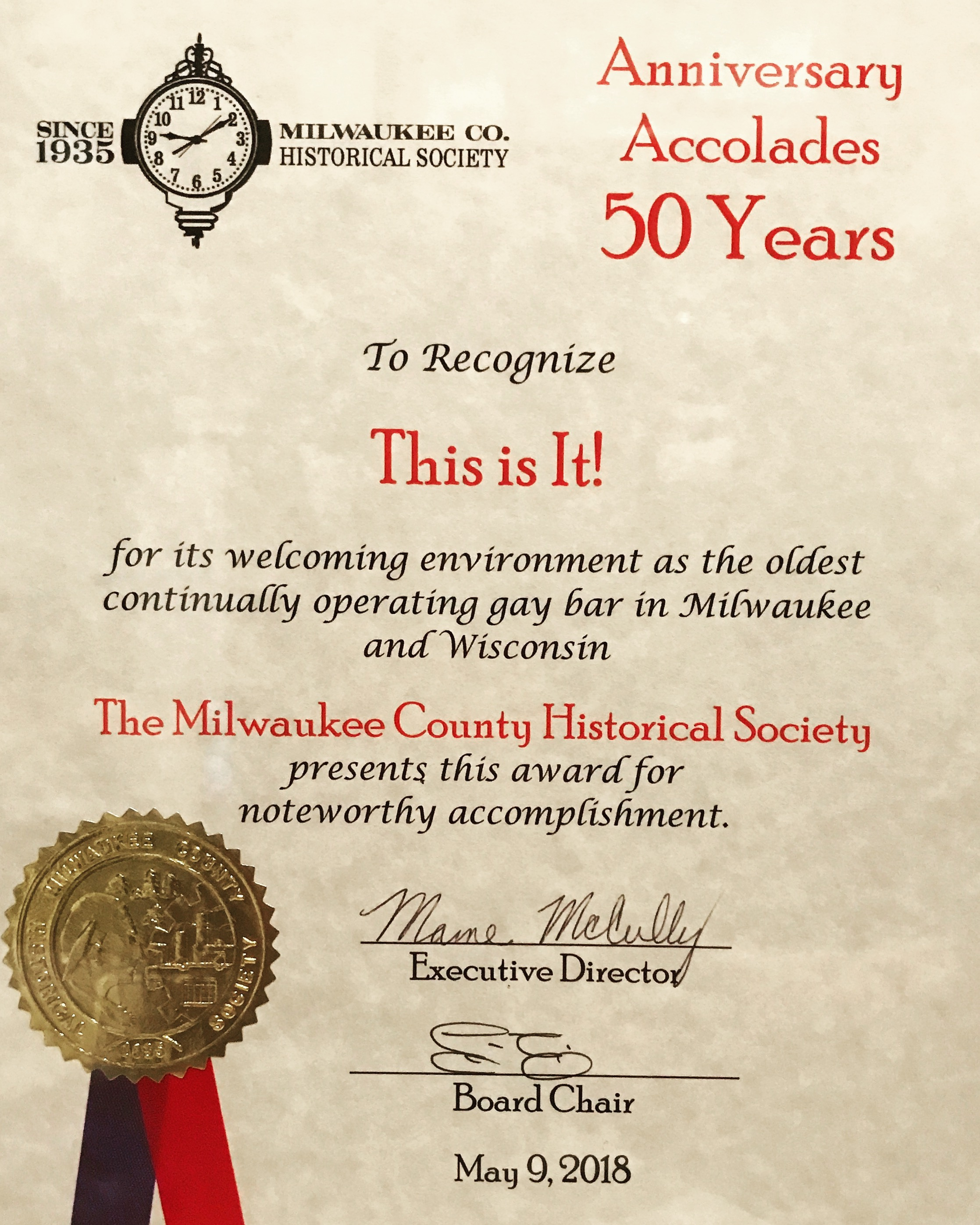
50th Anniversary Accolade

On May 9, 2018, the Milwaukee County Historical Society recognized This is It! at its Annual Awards Dinner. An Anniversary Accolade for 50 years of business was presented to the bar, citing the bar's "welcoming environment as the oldest continually operating gay bar in Milwaukee and Wisconsin".

== Logo Redesign Contest ==
In preparation for its 50th anniversary in 2018, This is It! hosted a logo redesign contest. Voting was conducted via the bar's website to narrow down the top submissions, and the four finalists were voted on in-person in the bar on April 11, 2017. The winning design was created by James "Thommy" Harless.

== Community involvement ==
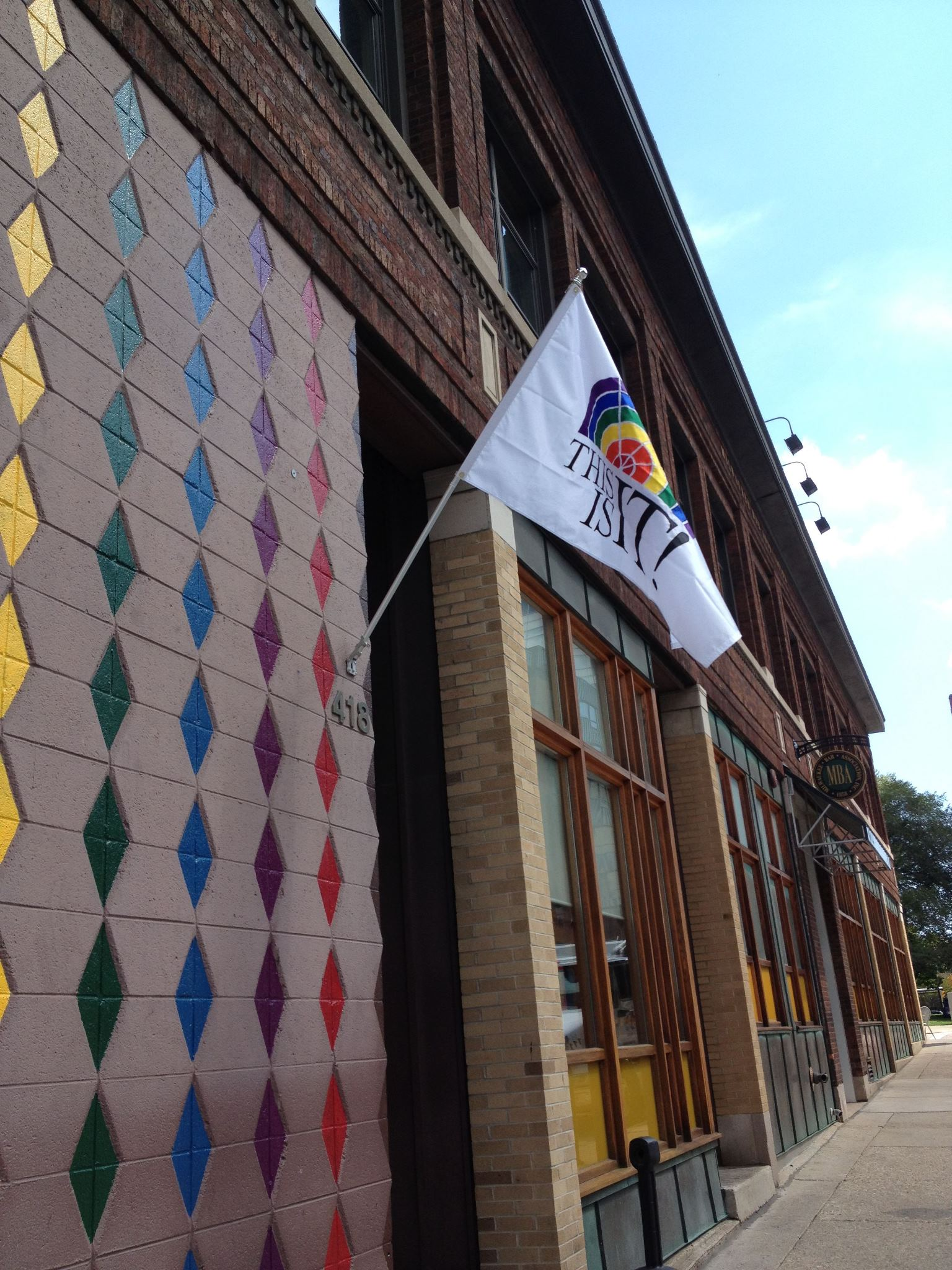
Front view of bar, 2012

This Is It! sponsored and supported LGBT+ and LGBT+ friendly organizations, and attempts to foster community involvement with its patrons. The bar started hosting a monthly "Pink Hat Party" fundraising event in January 2012. Beneficiaries of the monthly "Pink Hat Party" have included the Milwaukee LGBT Community Center, Aids Resource Center of Wisconsin, Milwaukee Symphony Orchestra, Cream City Foundation, and the G/L Community Fund. Early in 2018, the bar discontinued the Pink Hat Parties, planning to continue the tradition of fundraising under different formats.

This Is it! repeatedly sponsored the Milwaukee LGBT Community Center's Loft Lounge at PrideFest Milwaukee. Owner George Schneider also volunteered as PrideFest Milwaukee's Operations Director for many years as well as briefly serving as a board member during his last year with the organization. He resigned from PrideFest, Inc., now Milwaukee Pride, Inc., after the 2012 festival season, but continued to support the organization and annual festival.

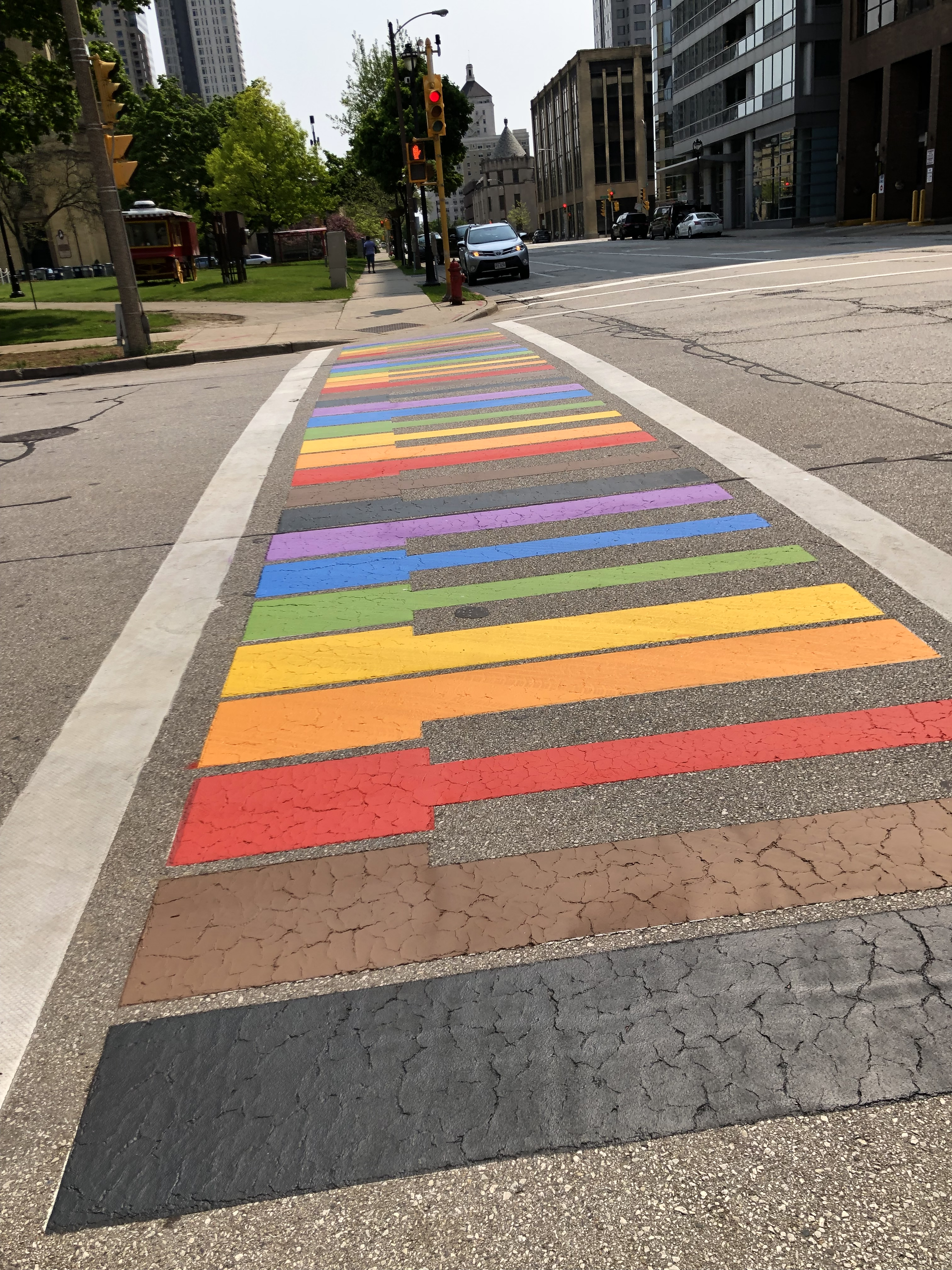
A view of the crosswalks looking east towards the lake.

At their annual meeting on April 6, 2018, Milwaukee LGBT Community Center members elected owner Schneider to their Board of Directors.

On a visit to Vancouver, British Columbia in October 2018, Schneider was impressed by that city's rainbow crosswalk installations. He shared an image on the bar's social media, and proposed the idea that Milwaukee should have similar crosswalk installations. The post was well received and Schneider began working with the City of Milwaukee to make the crosswalks a reality. It took nearly 2 years of work and cooperating with the City of Milwaukee to lay the foundations to install the crosswalks - the initial proposal being rejected. Finally, after seeking the aide of Milwaukee Pride, Inc., the East Town Association, and other community partners, the City of Milwaukee approved the installation officially on October 29, 2018. The crosswalks were painted on the morning of November 3, 2018, and a dedication ceremony hosted by Mayor Tom Barrett and Alderman Robert Bauman officially opened the crosswalks to the public.

== See also ==
- List of LGBTQ bars
