= The Trixie & Katya Show =

Television series

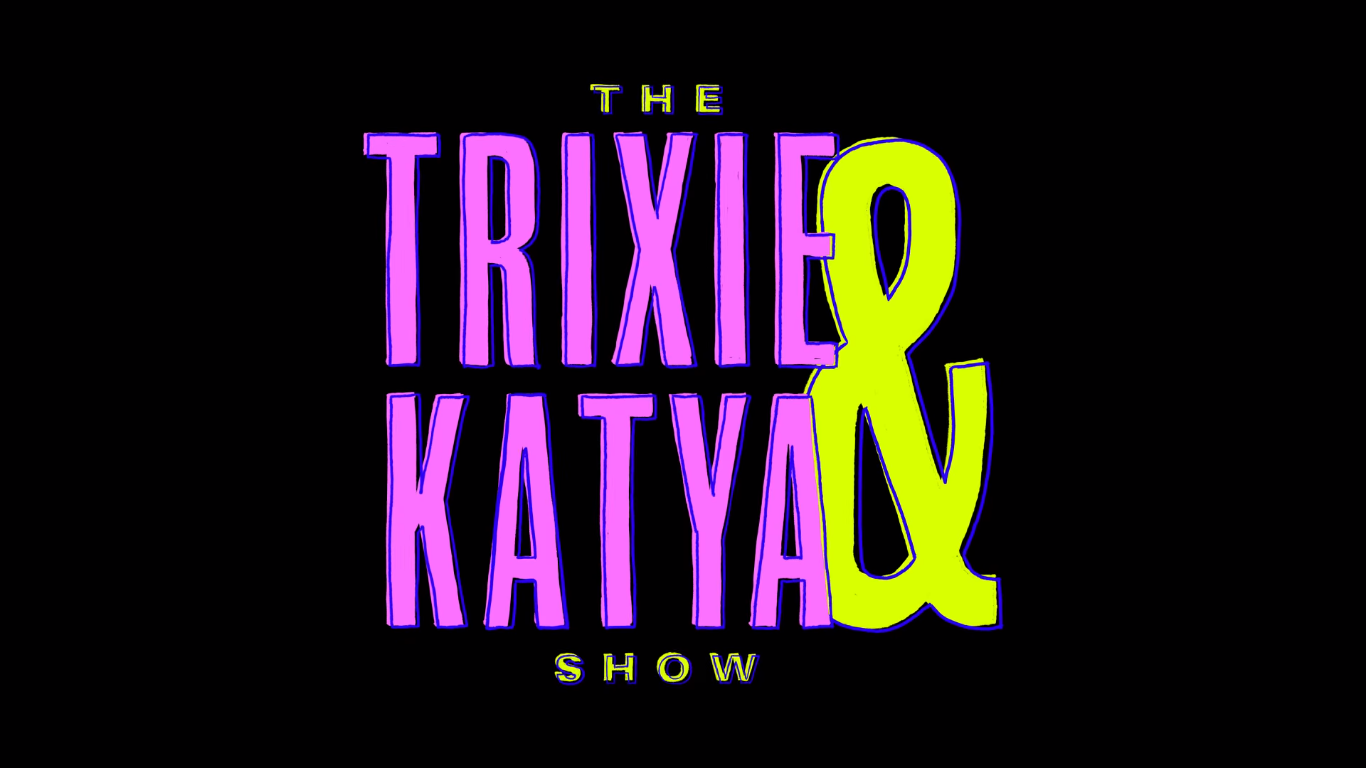
- Genre: Comedy
- Starring: Trixie Mattel; Katya Zamolodchikova; Bob the Drag Queen
- Country of origin: United States
- Original language: English
- No. of seasons: 1
- No. of episodes: 14

Production
- Executive producers: Fenton Bailey; Randy Barbato; Tom Campbell; Nelson Walters; RuPaul Charles; Nomi Ernst Leidner; Shane Smith; Eddy Moretti; Spike Jonze
- Editors: Ron Hill; Chris Smith
- Running time: 22 minutes
- Production company: World of Wonder

Original release
- Network: Viceland
- Release: November 15, 2017 – March 28, 2018

Related
- UNHhhh (2016–2023)

The Trixie & Katya Show is an American comedy television series featuring drag queens Trixie Mattel and Katya Zamolodchikova, who both rose to prominence competing on the seventh season of RuPaul's Drag Race. The show is a spin-off of the YouTube series UNHhhh, which turned both Trixie and Katya into "viral internet stars".

== Production ==
Ahead of its premiere on November 15, 2017, Viceland and World of Wonder made the show's first episode available online on November 3.

== Fill-in ==
Bob the Drag Queen appeared as a guest host in Katya's place for the final five episodes, after Katya announced a hiatus from drag to seek treatment after relapsing into the use of methamphetamine. The day after the season's finale, Katya tweeted her thanks to Bob for filling in for her while she recovered.

== Episodes ==
No.	Title	Original release date
1	"Hooking Up"	November 15, 2017
Trixie and Katya discuss the ins-and-outs of hooking up. Trixie reads Male Bag; Asking for a Friend (featuring Bob the Drag Queen); Katya plays Whore Drawer; Men on the Street: Sex Positions; Trixie and Katya Give a Guy Heads; The Lipnickis; Katya's Thwoorp; they also reveal their UNHhhh of the Week: Waiting.
2	"Death"	November 22, 2017
Trixie and Katya discuss funerals, diseases and natural disasters as they unpack the topic of death. Trixie reads Male Bag; Katya portrays Barbara May Bonaduce; Men on the Street: Fake or Fatal?; Things to Do Before You Die; Trixie & Katya's Survival Kit; Trixie and Katya Give a Mortician Heads (featuring Amber Carvaly from Undertaking LA) where they ask questions about what makes her mortuary different from other mortuaries, what it's like dressing a dead body, and other deathy queries; they also present their UNHhhh of the Week: De-Extinction.
3	"Porn"	November 29, 2017
Trixie and Katya address the topic of porn by discussing heterosexual porn, creating their own scenarios and asking the public. Make It a Porn; Asking for a Friend; Men on the Street: Porn Titles; Basket Shopping; Turn Offs; Trixie and Katya Give a Porn Star Heads (featuring Annie Cruz); they also present their UNHhhh of the Week: Porn Actresses.
4	"Fear"	December 6, 2017
Trixie and Katya discuss what keeps them up at night, scary movies and prank toys. Slasher or Smasher; Katya's Thwoorp; Asking for a Friend; Which Is Worse?; Trixie reads Male Bag; Men on the Street; Use It or Lose It; Trixie and Katya Give a Stuntwoman Heads (featuring Natalie Jean); they also present their UNHhhh of the Week: Memory Foam Mattresses.
5	"Break Ups"	January 24, 2018
Trixie and Katya talk break ups. They find the best way to do it, answer questions, and discover what real people know about their number one cause: Adultery.
6	"Spirituality"	January 31, 2018
Trixie and Katya talk about spirituality. They'll share their very own "Ten Commandments," answer viewer questions, and find out which is the freakiest of God's creatures.
7	"Sexual Health"	February 7, 2018
Trixie and Katya talk sexual health. They try out sex aids, share new positions to spice up your love life, and interview a real live porn star again!
8	"Self Love"	February 14, 2018
Trixie and Katya talk self love. They provide a guide to loving yourself, quiz people about the porn habits of their home states, and play a game called 'Tip that Nip'.
9	"Ass"	February 21, 2018
Trixie and Katya are talking all about ass! They provide a guide to backdoor action, review products for your butt, and interview art duo The Kaplan Twins.
10	"The Internet"	February 28, 2018
Trixie and Bob discuss the Internet. They try viral internet challenges, read real-life sexts, and give internet tips for "olds."
11	"Lies"	March 7, 2018
Trixie and Bob talk about lies. They listen to street confessions, give Ross Mathews a lie detector test, and play a game called "Can I Smell Your What??"
12	"Money"	March 14, 2018
Trixie and Bob talk money. They provide very unsound financial advice, give Fortune Feimster a job interview, and find out what their kidneys are worth.
13	"Taboos"	March 21, 2018
Trixie and Bob talk taboos. They invent ads for taboo products, talk about weird old beauty products, and play "Dirty Taboo" with Mamrie Hart.
14	"Family"	March 28, 2018
Trixie and Bob talk family.

== Reception ==
The A.V. Club gave the series an A− in a review based on the first three episodes of season one.

== See also ==
- List of comedy and variety television programs with LGBT cast members
- List of programs broadcast by Viceland
