= One Stone =

Studio album by Trixie Mattel
- Released: March 16, 2018
- Genre: Folk; country pop
- Length: 22:27
- Producer: Brandon James Gwinn

Trixie Mattel chronology
Homemade Christmas (2017)	One Stone (2018)	Trixie Mattel: Moving Parts (The Acoustic Soundtrack) (2019)

Singles from One Stone
- 1. "Moving Parts" Released: February 3, 2018; 2. "Break Your Heart" Released: March 17, 2018

One Stone is the second studio album by American drag queen Trixie Mattel, released on March 16, 2018. In June 2018, One Stone was listed by Billboard as one of the best albums of the year so far.

== Promotion ==
The lead single, "Moving Parts", was released following the premiere of the third season of RuPaul's Drag Race: All Stars, in which Trixie Mattel competed. One Stone was released after the season finale.

The music video for "Break Your Heart" was released on March 17.

== Track listing ==
All tracks are written by Trixie Mattel.

One Stone track listing
No.	Title	Length
1.	"Little Sister"	3:05
2.	"Break Your Heart"	2:25
3.	"Soldier"	3:06
4.	"Red Side of the Moon"	4:19
5.	"Moving Parts"	3:17
6.	"The Well"	2:59
7.	"Wind up Man"	3:19

Physical edition bonus track
No.	Title	Length
8.	"Little Sister" (Studio City Live)	3:19

== Personnel ==
- Brian Firkus/Trixie Mattel – songwriting (all tracks), lead vocals (all tracks), guitars (all tracks), auto-harp (tracks 5 and 7)
- Brandon James Gwinn – production (all tracks), background vocals (all tracks), violin (all tracks), drums (tracks 2, 3, 5 and 7), cajón (tracks 1, 4 and 6), trumpet (track 3)

== Charts ==
Chart performance for One Stone
Chart (2018)	Peak position
Australian Albums (ARIA)	85
Scottish Albums (OCC)	66
US Americana/Folk Albums (Billboard)	16
US Digital Albums (Billboard)	17
US Heatseekers Albums (Billboard)	1
US Independent Albums (Billboard)	10
US Rock Album Sales (Billboard)	19
US Top Album Sales (Billboard)	64
US Top Current Albums (Billboard)	58
