= UNHhhh =

Comedy web series

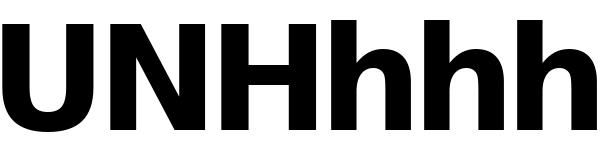
- Genre: Comedy; Talk show; LGBT+
- Starring: Trixie Mattel; Katya Zamolodchikova
- Country of origin: United States
- Original language: English
- No. of seasons: 8
- No. of episodes: 231

Production
- Producers: Pete Williams; Charlie Brewer; Jess Wolinsky; Blake Jacobs; Alex Liley-Roth
- Editors: Ron Hill; Griffin Prall; Jeff Maccubbin; Paul Detrick; Christopher Smith
- Camera setup: Single-camera
- Running time: 4–15 minutes
- Production company: World of Wonder

Original release
- Release: March 25, 2016 – December 20, 2023

Related
- The Trixie & Katya Show (2017-18); I Like to Watch (2019–present); Trixie and Katya Save the World (2020)

UNHhhh is an American comedy web series starring drag queens Trixie Mattel and Katya Zamolodchikova. In the series, Trixie and Katya discuss a topic humorously in front of a green screen. UNHhhh premiered on March 25, 2016, one year after Mattel and Zamolodchikova appeared in the seventh season of RuPaul's Drag Race. The show is aired through World Of Wonder's YouTube channel, as well as through its video-on-demand service WOW Presents Plus. UNHhhh has been nominated for ten Streamy Awards throughout its run, winning Unscripted Series at the 2020 ceremony, which the duo also hosted.

== Production ==
The show began in March 2016, and aired 65 episodes before World of Wonder announced the conclusion to the show and the premiere of The Trixie & Katya Show, a television spin-off on Viceland. The Trixie & Katya Show was canceled after one season and the series returned to YouTube for its third season in October 2018. Beginning with season three, new episodes would premiere on WOW Presents Plus uncensored the week before being released on YouTube. A fourth season aired from January 16 to September 12, 2019, with a special Christmas episode on December 11, 2019.

On September 20, 2019, Trixie Mattel uploaded a video on her personal Twitter account revealing that the series would return for a fifth season, which premiered on January 22, 2020. The series then went into a brief hiatus from March to August 2020 due to the COVID-19 pandemic, with Trixie and Katya Save the World airing as a replacement series during this time. On July 22, World of Wonder released a teaser on their YouTube page saying that UNHhhh would be returning on August 5 with new episodes filmed during the pandemic and some that were filmed before but not edited. To accommodate social distancing guidelines, Trixie and Katya were seated at a distance and filmed with multiple cameras, being edited to look closer together in the final cut. The season concluded on December 30, 2020 with the hosts confirming a sixth season would be produced which premiered on WOWPresents+ on April 21, 2021. Starting with season six, episodes were released on WOW Presents Plus one month before their YouTube debut. Season seven premiered on April 20, 2022, and was followed by season 8, which premiered on YouTube on April 19, 2023.

In the last episode of season 8, it was stated in the episodes description "UNHhhh yea... that's a wrap on season 8. While Trixie and Katya take a hiatus, relish in these random moments from the most recent topics. Stay subscribed and we'll see you again in 2024.". Despite this, season 9 was not released in 2024.

On May 12, 2025, a copyright registration was filed by the producing company of the series. The filing of the copyright does not guarantee that UNHhhh season 9 will ever be released, and if released it may not be with the same format, nor featuring Trixie and Katya as in past seasons. In September 2025, Katya confirmed on Eric Sedeno's podcast that there are no plans to make any further episodes as the duo wished to focus on other projects together.

== Format ==
The episodes span around 10–20 minutes in length on average and are produced in front of a green screen. Each episode covers one topic such as Beauty Tips or Colors, and features Trixie and Katya's brand of dark adult humor. The two drag queens often go on tangents in each episode, playing jokes off of one another. The use of the green screen results in edit-heavy episodes that add to the humor, with many moments or sound bites becoming memes and often quoted by fans. Each episode begins with the queens giving humorous intros, a trend started by Trixie Mattel in the second episode with "I'm market woman of the Serengeti, Trixie Mattel." The web series is heavily self-reflexive, with gags often repeating or being repeated on sister productions for Trixie and Katya, such as their podcast The Bald and the Beautiful.

== Episodes ==
Season	Episodes	Originally released	
Season	Episodes	First released	Last released
1	37	March 25, 2016	December 30, 2016
2	32	March 20, 2017	November 13, 2017
3	11	October 17, 2018	December 26, 2018
4	32	January 16, 2019	December 11, 2019
5	32	January 22, 2020	December 30, 2020
6	30	April 21, 2021	December 22, 2021
7	27	April 20, 2022	November 30, 2022
8	30	March 15, 2023	December 20, 2023

=== Season 1 (2016) ===
No. overall	No. in season	Title	Length	Release date
2	2	"RDR8 Cast Advice"	5:24	April 1, 2016
Intro - Trixie: I put the pal in high school principal, Trixie Mattel. Katya: I'm a life-size human person, Katya.
3	3	"Traveling"	6:52	April 8, 2016
4	4	"Dating"	6:12	April 15, 2016
5	5	"Dating PART 2"	5:20	April 22, 2016
6	6	"Sex in Drag"	6:06	April 29, 2016
7	7	"Worst Hookup"	3:56	May 6, 2016
8	8	"Drag Names"	6:13	May 20, 2016
9	9	"Hollywood Blvd"	3:52	June 3, 2016
10	10	"Drag Show Etiquette"	7:54	June 10, 2016
11	11	"Money part 1"	7:17	June 24, 2016
12	12	"Money part 2"	9:16	July 1, 2016
13	13	"Flirting part 1"	9:10	July 8, 2016
14	14	"Flirting part 2"	9:58	July 15, 2016
15	15	"Health & Fitness Pt 1"	8:20	July 22, 2016
16	16	"Health & Fitness Pt 2"	8:29	July 29, 2016
17	17	"Bloopers"	4:51	August 5, 2016
18	18	"RuPaul's All Stars Drag Race"	7:39	August 12, 2016
19	19	"Religion"	7:16	August 19, 2016
20	20	"Female UNHgasm pt 1"	4:44	August 29, 2016
21	21	"Female UNHgasm pt 2"	5:33	September 5, 2016
22	22	"Social Media"	7:38	September 12, 2016
23	23	"Twitter Questions"	7:22	September 19, 2016
24	24	"Getting Older"	7:34	September 26, 2016
25	25	"Beauty Tips Pt 1"	7:56	October 3, 2016
26	26	"Beauty Tips Pt 2"	8:19	October 10, 2016
27	27	"Dreams pt 1"	7:49	October 17, 2016
28	28	"Wet Dreams pt 2"	5:12	October 24, 2016
29	29	"Halloweenie"	10:09	October 31, 2016
30	30	"F*ckin Random"	9:39	November 7, 2016
31	31	"SPACE"	11:12	November 14, 2016
32	32	"Thanxgiving"	9:09	November 21, 2016
33	33	"Childhood"	7:08	November 28, 2016
34	34	"Kids and Parenthood"	8:45	December 5, 2016
35	35	"Hollywood"	10:59	December 12, 2016
36	36	"Happy Holidaze"	10:39	December 19, 2016
37	37	"New Year New You"	12:36	December 30, 2016

=== Season 2 (2017) ===
No. overall	No. in season	Title	Length	Release date
38	1	"Season 2 & the Future (featuring Mrs. Kasha Davis & Tempest DuJour)"	13:34	March 20, 2017
38–2	1–2	"RDR9 Promo Reaction"	14:05	March 24, 2017
39	2	"Magic part 1"	8:11	March 27, 2017
40	3	"Magic part 2"	7:02	April 3, 2017
41	4	"How's Your Head?"	6:02	April 10, 2017
42	5	"How's Your Head? Pt. 2"	5:55	April 17, 2017
43	6	"High School"	8:09	April 24, 2017
44	7	"High School Part 2"	7:54	May 8, 2017
45	8	"Music"	9:43	May 15, 2017
46	9	"Jobs Before Drag Race"	9:38	May 22, 2017
47	10	"Part 2: Jobs Before Drag Race Part 2"	9:28	May 29, 2017
48	11	"RuPaul's Drag Race #LipDub"	9:09	June 5, 2017
49	12	"PornOh Honey"	10:21	June 12, 2017
50	13	"Random AF"	9:05	June 19, 2017
51	14	"Plastic Surgery"	10:00	June 26, 2017
52	15	"Caughtny Act"	10:46	July 10, 2017
53	16	"Best of Trixie"	14:43	July 17, 2017
54	17	"Best of Katya"	14:32	July 24, 2017
55	18	"Willam"	9:20	July 31, 2017
56	19	"Too Bizzy with Sky Dancers"	0:59	August 7, 2017
57	20	"The 90s"	10:35	August 14, 2017
58	21	"Death"	8:35	August 21, 2017
59	22	"Death (again)"	9:46	August 28, 2017
60	23	"Untuck"	3:06	September 4, 2017
61	24	"That's So Random"	9:01	September 11, 2017
62	25	"Drinking"	10:33	September 25, 2017
63	26	"Drugs"	11:05	October 9, 2017
64	27	"Time"	9:29	October 16, 2017
65	28	"Crying"	10:01	October 23, 2017
66	29	"Hallowiener"	10:16	October 30, 2017
67	30	"The Last Random"	8:43	November 6, 2017
68	31	"Goodbye Barbara"	13:12	November 13, 2017

=== Season 3 (2018) ===
No. overall	No. in season	Title	Length	Release date
69	1	"Reunions"	10:28	October 17, 2018
70	2	"Happy Halloweiner"	10:02	October 24, 2018
71	3	"Censorship"	8:56	October 31, 2018
72	4	"Global Warming"	9:51	November 7, 2018
73	5	"All Stars"	10:39	November 14, 2018
74	6	"Food"	9:35	November 21, 2018
75	7	"Online Dating Part 1"	8:40	November 28, 2018
76	8	"Online Dating Part 2"	9:37	December 5, 2018
77	9	"Hair"	10:26	December 12, 2018
78	10	"Holiday Gifting"	11:12	December 19, 2018
79	11	"Best of Season 3"	10:10	December 26, 2018

=== Season 4 (2019) ===
No. overall	No. in season	Title	Length	Release date
80	1	"Apologies"	11:54	January 16, 2019
81	2	"Personal Hygiene"	10:40	January 23, 2019
82	3	"Roommates Part 1"	11:02	January 30, 2019
83	4	"Roommates Part 2"	9:31	February 6, 2019
84	5	"Return of the Random"	10:38	February 13, 2019
85	6	"Driving"	12:23	February 20, 2019
86	7	"Phones"	10:30	February 27, 2019
87	8	"Doctors"	10:57	March 6, 2019
88	9	"Self Esteem"	10:41	March 13, 2019
89	10	"Shopping Part 1"	10:35	March 20, 2019
90	11	"Shopping Part 2"	12:17	March 27, 2019
91	12	"Crime Part 1"	10:58	April 3, 2019
92	13	"Crime Part 2"	11:19	April 10, 2019
93	14	"Fame"	10:20	April 17, 2019
94	15	"Self Care"	9:54	April 24, 2019
95	16	"Wealth"	10:23	May 1, 2019
96	17	"Gaming"	11:08	May 8, 2019
97	18	"Shame Part 1"	10:47	May 15, 2019
98	19	"Shame Part 2"	9:59	May 22, 2019
99	20	"Online Shopping (sponsored by Klarna)"	10:38	June 5, 2019
100	21	"The 100th Episode Milestones"	14:01	June 12, 2019
101	22	"Random VI – Too Hot for Your Mom Pt 1"	10:27	June 20, 2019
102	23	"Random VII – The Randoming Part 2"	10:54	June 27, 2019
103	24	"Pets"	10:55	July 3, 2019
104	25	"Astrology Pt 1 – Katya's Taurus Truth"	9:40	July 10, 2019
105	26	"Astrology Pt 2 – Trixie's a Virgo Who Can't Drive"	8:38	July 17, 2019
106	27	"Secrets Pt 1"	10:52	July 24, 2019
107	28	"Secrets Pt 2"	10:51	July 31, 2019
108	29	"R&R"	10:08	August 7, 2019
109	30	"Random Part 8: Content Clearance Sale!"	10:07	August 14, 2019
110	31	"Random Part 9: Wild Flamingos of Sumatra"	8:36	September 12, 2019
111	32	"A Very Mary UNHhhhliday"	13:12	December 11, 2019

=== Season 5 (2020) ===
No. overall	No. in season	Title	Length	Release date
112	1	"Women in 2020"	9:43	January 22, 2020
113	2	"Dental Artistry"	10:33	January 29, 2020
114	3	"I'm in My 30s"	10:43	February 5, 2020
115	4	"Walking Children in Nature Part 1"	10:47	February 12, 2020
116	5	"Walking Children in Nature Part 2"	10:10	February 19, 2020
117	6	"Winning and Losing"	11:26	February 26, 2020
118	7	"Doll Hoarder"	11:46	March 4, 2020
119	8	"Gurl, You Gay"	12:27	March 11, 2020
120	9	"Random X"	10:38	March 18, 2020
121	10	"#WOWHelpMe"	13:10	March 25, 2020
122	11	"Movies"	13:29	August 5, 2020
123	12	"Books"	13:16	August 12, 2020
124	13	"Weight"	12:54	August 19, 2020
125	14	"Toxic Masculinity Part 1"	11:12	August 26, 2020
126	15	"Toxic Masculinity Part 2"	10:51	September 2, 2020
127	16	"Getting Fired"	12:47	September 9, 2020
128	17	"Procrastination"	13:17	September 16, 2020
129	18	"Drama"	14:32	September 23, 2020
130	19	"Random XI"	11:14	September 30, 2020
131	20	"Straight People"	14:13	October 7, 2020
132	21	"Texting Etiquette"	13:39	October 14, 2020
133	22	"Halloween IV"	13:00	October 21, 2020
134	23	"Fighting"	14:45	October 28, 2020
135	24	"Season 7 React"	13:45	November 4, 2020
136	25	"Moving"	14:39	November 11, 2020
137	26	"I'm Sick Part 1"	12:44	November 18, 2020
138	27	"Getting Sick Part 2"	12:44	November 25, 2020
139	28	"Ready 4 Love"	13:17	December 2, 2020
140	29	"Power"	12:36	December 9, 2020
141	30	"Make Loneliness Work for You"	11:24	December 16, 2020
142	31	"The Weather"	13:35	December 23, 2020
143	32	"Random XII"	9:48	December 30, 2020

=== Season 6 (2021) ===
No. overall	No. in season	Title	Length	Release date
144	1	"Quitting"	12:17	April 21, 2021
145	2	"Waiting"	12:28	April 28, 2021
146	3	"Pulling the Padge"	11:36	May 5, 2021
147	4	"Pain"	12:40	May 12, 2021
148	5	"Babies!"	12:12	May 19, 2021
149	6	"Teachers"	12:05	May 26, 2021
150	7	"Stress"	11:01	June 2, 2021
151	8	"Superheroes & Villains"	13:55	June 9, 2021
152	9	"Disappointment"	12:43	June 16, 2021
153	10	"Random XIII"	12:08	June 23, 2021
154	11	"Trading Pics"	12:07	July 21, 2021
155	12	"Lunch"	10:10	July 28, 2021
156	13	"Tired"	12:58	August 4, 2021
157	14	"Style Journey Reaction"	13:23	August 11, 2021
158	15	"Heat"	12:05	August 18, 2021
159	16	"Theatre"	12:17	August 26, 2021
160	17	"The News"	12:15	September 1, 2021
161	18	"Hotels"	12:15	September 8, 2021
162	19	"Old"	11:58	September 15, 2021
163	20	"Random XIV"	11:20	September 21, 2021
164	21	"Sleep"	12:14	October 20, 2021
165	22	"Halloween V"	13:31	October 27, 2021
166	23	"Marriage"	12:18	November 3, 2021
167	24	"Drag Show Etiquette part 2"	14:28	November 10, 2021
168	25	"Television"	11:58	November 17, 2021
169	26	"Colors"	13:23	November 24, 2021
170	27	"Nudity"	12:48	December 1, 2021
171	28	"Security"	12:23	December 8, 2021
172	29	"Smells"	11:33	December 15, 2021
173	30	"Random 15"	13:50	December 22, 2021

=== Season 7 (2022) ===
No. overall	No. in season	Title	Length	Release date
174	1	"Complaining"	12:53	April 20, 2022
175	2	"Hoarding"	13:33	April 27, 2022
176	3	"Help"	11:45	May 4, 2022
177	4	"Sports"	12:05	May 11, 2022
178	5	"Body Parts"	12:12	May 18, 2022
179	6	"Change"	12:00	May 26, 2022
180	7	"Change part 2"	12:04	June 1, 2022
181	8	"Time... Again"	13:12	June 8, 2022
182	9	"Travel"	12:06	June 15, 2022
183	10	"Random XVI"	11:44	June 22, 2022
184	11	"Emotions"	11:48	July 20, 2022
185	12	"Men"	11:45	July 27, 2022
186	13	"Reactions"	12:13	August 3, 2022
187	14	"Lying"	12:30	August 10, 2022
188	15	"Reading"	11:49	August 17, 2022
189	16	"Fear"	12:38	August 24, 2022
190	17	"Exit Strategy"	12:18	August 31, 2022
191	18	"Seduction"	12:22	September 7, 2022
192	19	"Language"	12:56	September 14, 2022
193	20	"Random 17"	11:55	September 21, 2022
194	21	"Relationships"	11:34	October 19, 2022
195	22	"Halloween 6"	11:22	October 26, 2022
196	23	"Bathrooms"	13:06	November 2, 2022
197	24	"Humiliation"	12:10	November 9, 2022
198	25	"Rude"	11:46	November 16, 2022
199	26	"Dance"	12:37	November 23, 2022
199.9	27	"Random 18"	11:18	November 30, 2022

=== Season 8 (2023) ===
No. overall	No. in season	Title	Length	Release date
200	1	"Jealousy"	13:15	March 15, 2023
201	2	"Theft"	12:25	March 22, 2023
202	3	"Domesticity"	13:17	March 29, 2023
203	4	"Hobbies"	13:12	April 5, 2023
204	5	"Problems"	12:48	April 12, 2023
205	6	"Punishment"	12:25	April 19, 2023
206	7	"Phones... again"	13:39	April 26, 2023
207	8	"College"	13:09	May 3, 2023
208	9	"Awards"	12:30	May 10, 2023
209	10	"Random 19"	13:49	May 17, 2023
210	11	"Bottoming"	14:12	June 21, 2023
211	12	"Summer"	12:38	June 28, 2023
212	13	"Computers"	13:36	July 5, 2023
213	14	"Luck"	13:00	July 12, 2023
214	15	"Confusion"	12:04	July 19, 2023
215	16	"Modeling"	13:56	July 26, 2023
216	17	"Straight People: The Sequel"	13:02	August 2, 2023
217	18	"Fun"	12:35	August 9, 2023
218	19	"Energy"	13:19	August 17, 2023
219	20	"Random 20"	11:49	August 23, 2023
220	21	"Nightmares"	13:48	October 18, 2023
221	22	"Halloween 7"	11:48	October 25, 2023
222	23	"Aliens"	13:00	November 1, 2023
223	24	"Mistakes"	12:37	November 8, 2023
224	25	"The Mail"	13:11	November 15, 2023
225	26	"Packages"	11:39	November 22, 2023
226	27	"Winter"	12:27	November 29, 2023
227	28	"Windows"	12:44	December 6, 2023
228	29	"Youth"	14:36	December 13, 2023
229	30	"Random 21"	12:34	December 20, 2023

=== Special episodes ===
No.	Title	Length	Release date
S	"Trixie and Katya's Fashion Photo RuView, RuView of Raja and Raven"	12:35	December 31, 2015
S	"Teaser"	2:38	March 18, 2016
S	"RuPaul's Drag Race season 8 Grand Finale"	4:00	May 13, 2016
S	"RuPaul's DragCon NYC 2016"	29:43	May 27, 2016
S	"Live at RuPaul's DragCon 2017"	37:05	May 19, 2017
S	"700 Thousand Subscribers – THANK YOU!"	0:22	May 18, 2017
S	"Happy 3rd of July (with Courtney Act)"	1:00	July 3, 2017
S	"UNHhhh Panel w/ Trixie Mattel, Bob the Drag Queen & Katya at RuPaul's DragCon NYC 2017"	29:52	September 18, 2017
S	"Trixie & Katya walk to the UNHhhh panel at RuPaul's DragCon NYC 2018"	0:59	June 27, 2018
S	"UNHhhh Panel DragCon NY 2018"	27:00	September 29, 2018
S	"UNHhhh Returns Oct 17"	1:37	October 10, 2018
S	"Panel at DragCon LA 2019"	36:24	June 3, 2019
S	"A Streaming Pile of UNHhhh"	11:46	June 19, 2019
S	"UNHhhh Panel: RuPaul's DragCon NYC 2019 (featuring the amazing and talented Jeff Maccubbin of UNHHHH editing fame)"	30:50	September 18, 2019
S	"We're Nominated for a Streamy (and we've got an UNHhhhnouncement)!"	2:19	October 30, 2019
S	"UNHhhh Returns August 5!"	0:56	July 22, 2020
S	"UNHhhh: 5th Anniversary UNHhhhnnouncement"	1:03	March 25, 2021
S	"Trixie and Katya React to Hocus Pocus 2 Trailer"	5:37	September 28, 2022

== Spin-offs ==
=== Trixie and Katya Save the World ===
Trixie and Katya Save the World was created as a replacement for UNHhhh, which was on hiatus due to the 2020 COVID-19 pandemic. Filmed in the duo's homes over videochat, the show features the queens answering questions and attempting to solve the audience member's problems, in a vein similar to the "Asking For a Friend" bit from their Viceland series. The series premiered on March 30, 2020, exclusively on WOW Presents Plus, although the eighth episode was also released on YouTube.

==== Reception ====
Vice's Rachel Miller stated, "Trixie and Katya's show is actually my favorite part of all of this [RuPaul's Drag Race related fandom], and it totally stands alone; I'd recommend getting into it even if you don't watch Drag Race proper." The show was positively reviewed by Rachel Paulson of The Queer Creative podcast.

==== Episodes ====
No.	Title	Length	Release date
1	"Self Isolation, Motivation, and Truth"	13:21	March 30, 2020
2	"The Wigs Are at the Other House"	14:17	April 6, 2020
3	"Alone with a Camera"	13:19	April 13, 2020
4	"Can I Gash You a Question"	13:28	April 20, 2020
5	"The Straights Are Not Okay"	13:58	May 4, 2020
6	"Roller Coasters, Zoom Funerals, and Tongue Scrapers"	14:00	May 11, 2020
7	"Hippie Hair, Problematic Print, and a Knife"	10:08	May 18, 2020
8	"Warm Dry Bread"	9:38	May 25, 2020
9	"You Can Drink at Home, Mary!"	12:20	June 1, 2020
10	"Babe?"	12:39	June 8, 2020
11	"Lesbians Love Love"	14:46	June 15, 2020
12	"I Need It Yesterday, Bitch"	12:51	June 21, 2020

=== UNHhhh, the Podcast ===
During the COVID-19 filming hiatus, episodes 1–121 were uploaded in podcast format with later episodes being uploaded gradually.

=== The Bald and the Beautiful ===
The Bald and the Beautiful
- Genre: Comedy, Beauty
- Language: English

Cast and voices
- Hosted by: Trixie Mattel; Katya Zamolodchikova

Production
- Length: 21–104 minutes

Publication
- No. of episodes: 241 (+7 revisited episodes)
- Original release: October 6, 2020
- Provider: Studio71
- Updates: Weekly (Tuesday)

On October 6, 2020 the duo premiered a new podcast called The Bald and the Beautiful. The show "feature[s] a pair of grizzled gay ghouls exploring the culture boundaries of modern beauty through interviews with gorgeous guests who inhabit various facets of the beauty industry."

Starting with episode 35, episodes were additionally released as video podcasts on the official Trixie & Katya YouTube channel. On October 26, 2021, the duo announced that the podcast would go on an extended hiatus. However, they returned the next week, confirming that they planned to finish out the year and later continued the podcast into 2022.

The show won the 2021 Canadian Podcast Award for Outstanding Foreign Series; the Queerty Award for Best Podcast (and was the runner-up the following year); and the 2022 Webby Award for Best Podcast Ad.

==== Episodes ====
No.	Title	Length	Release date
1	"Nosferatu Vibes"	52:15	October 6, 2020
2	""Home Grown, Home Blown" with Fena Barbitall"	53:10	October 13, 2020
3	""Dirty Ted and Steffanie" with Kim Chi"	53:42	October 20, 2020
4	"Three Bald Men Deciding Who Looks More Like This Bald Man with David Silver"	49:33	October 27, 2020
5	"Deceptively Old at Arby's with Wesley Woods"	1:00:18	November 3, 2020
6	"Gym Peacocking on Taco Tuesday with Jaida Essence Hall & Heidi N Closet"	1:05:01	November 10, 2020
7	"The Lure of the Potent Dad Nut"	40:54	November 17, 2020
8	"A Dainty 6'2" with Bob the Drag Queen"	56:23	November 24, 2020
9	"The Nightmare Rock with Ashley Levy of The Blah Blah Blahs"	53:56	December 1, 2020
10	"A Pantsuit of Fur with Teddy Bear"	55:33	December 8, 2020
11	"A Cooler Full of Curry with Amy Doan"	50:47	December 15, 2020
12	"Just Looking For JTT with Franz Szony"	44:34	December 22, 2020
13	"The Price of Perfection with Violet Chachki"	1:06:55	December 29, 2020
14	"Alexis Thunderstorm 500 with Alaska Thunderfuck"	1:02:43	January 5, 2021
15	"Sock Puppet with the Hand Pulled Out with Jackie Beat"	1:00:04	January 12, 2021
16	"Hot in Many Circles"	45:40	January 19, 2021
17	"The Sound of Music with Frisbee Jenkins"	53:25	January 26, 2021
18	"No Longer Homeless and Loving It with Miss Fame"	59:13	February 2, 2021
19	"When It's Appropriate to Shush Katie Couric with Gigi Gorgeous"	55:48	February 9, 2021
20	"Cum Dump Millionaire with Priyanka"	1:04:41	February 16, 2021
21	"I'm Bread Pitt and This is Ghoulia Roberts"	45:15	February 23, 2021
22	"Trash Bags Full of Cash with Mrs. Kasha Davis"	58:25	March 2, 2021
23	"Let the Goode Times Roll with Gigi Goode"	56:56	March 9, 2021
24	"Big Tweaker Energy with Jamie Kennedy"	58:14	March 16, 2021
25	"Fruit is Nature's Candy!"	48:24	March 23, 2021
26	"Witch Goddess of the Woods with Pearl"	56:48	March 30, 2021
27	"Please Meet My Fur Coat, Her Name is Darlene with Darian Darling"	48:04	April 6, 2021
28	"Bug-Eyed TikTok Bitch with Brittany Broski"	1:06:16	April 13, 2021
29	"Heaven is an Orange Julius"	55:38	April 20, 2021
30	"A Can of Beans in the Dishwasher with Trixie & Trixie's Mom^{1}"	1:11:14	April 27, 2021
31	"Dreaming About Being a Sumo Wrestler with Katya & Katya's "Mom"^{2}"	49:29	May 4, 2021
32	"A Cat Litter Retreat in Mexico"	1:06:12	May 11, 2021
33	"Chelsea Handler!"	46:43	May 18, 2021
34	"Hard Turds Only with Monét X Change"	52:45	June 1, 2021
35	"The Niagara Falls of Vomit"	54:33	June 8, 2021
36	"Inside Katya with Katya^{2}"	59:57	June 15, 2021
37	"Making Jiz & Filming Jiz with Jeff Maccubbin"	59:34	June 22, 2021
38	"Dead Teeth & Golden Showers with Sarah Schauer"	46:33	June 29, 2021
39	"Faux Bangs & Straight-Man Dungarees"	49:37	July 6, 2021
40	"Ice Luges, Lit Cigarettes & Non-Flushable Turds"	1:01:51	July 13, 2021
41	"Believing in Milk & Cookies"	56:48	July 20, 2021
42	"A Cherry-Poppin' Christmas with Macy Rodman"	1:12:41	July 27, 2021
43	"Taking an Octopus' Agency with Patti Harrison & River Ramirez"	1:05:42	August 3, 2021
44	"Glory Holes & Catsup with Jeff Maccubbin & Ron Hill"	59:57	August 10, 2021
45	"Medals, Mortality, & Medical Sex Vibes"	54:46	August 17, 2021
46	"Bottoms, Babies, & Blood Pressure"	56:11	August 24, 2021
47	"Banned From Studio 54"	58:49	August 31, 2021
48	"Hell Hath No Fury Like Teenage Twitter"	49:46	September 7, 2021
49	"Texas, Tennis, & Two Turntables and a Microphone"	56:12	September 14, 2021
50	"Fisting is the New Kissing"	54:06	September 21, 2021
51	"Bathed in the Blood of Gratitude"	53:56	September 28, 2021
52	"Beauty Tips, Bathroom Raccoons, & Talking Tumors"	54:30	October 26, 2021
53	""Walking Dead Hotness" in a Hospital Gown"	44:32	November 2, 2021
54	"A Teeny Weeny Tot Foundation Donation"	42:41	November 9, 2021
55	"All Vampires are Queer with Harvey Guillén from What We Do in the Shadows"	59:48	November 16, 2021
56	""If I'm Not Laughing, I'm Having Fun""	46:28	November 23, 2021
57	"A Baby in an Asbestos Bag"	48:40	November 30, 2021
58	"Little-Known Michelle Branch Facts with Michelle Branch^{1}"	55:26	December 7, 2021
59	"Sniffin' for Coq Au Vin"	47:59	December 14, 2021
60	"A 2014 Hyundai Elantra for Christmas"	50:14	December 21, 2021
61	"Perfect Don't Need No Polish"	51:56	December 28, 2021
62	"RuPaul's Drag Race Season 14 Premiere Extravaganza"	49:47	January 5, 2022
63	"Building a Fake Hospital in Your House with Alexis Stone"	1:09:07	January 11, 2022
64	"Gorgeous Devours Cute"	52:12	January 25, 2022
65	"A Coat-Hanger Encased in a Hot Dog with "Matthew""	57:15	February 8, 2022
66	"Holding a Large Fish on Machu Picchu"	59:54	February 22, 2022
67	"Bald, Fat Silly Putty with Googly Eyes"	59:52	March 8, 2022
68	"The Face Giveth and the Face Taketh Away"	59:16	March 22, 2022
69	"How to Properly Wash Your Genitals"	51:48	April 4, 2022
70	"Live from the Moontower Comedy Festival"	1:20:26	April 19, 2022
71	"Sun-Dried Hot Dog Legs"	59:50	May 3, 2022
72	"Eating Cheetos on the Floor of the Met Gala with Kelly Mantle & Katya^{2}"	1:09:26	May 17, 2022
73	"A Heavy Pour & Three Oscillating Fans"	55:02	May 31, 2022
74	"Happy Pride! Make America Gape Again!"	56:33	June 14, 2022
75	"A Hot Masseuse Has Sex with Freddy Krueger"	52:29	June 28, 2022
76	"Nobody's Snowballing in This Economy"	59:51	July 12, 2022
77	"Bald, Blue, Glowing-Dong Representation on TV"	1:02:37	July 26, 2022
78	"TikTok Monkeys Saved My Life"	54:29	August 9, 2022
79	"Hell Hath No Fury Like a Cockroach Scorned"	53:57	September 6, 2022
80	"A Beginner's Guide to Comic Books, Butt Stuff, & Homemade Limeade"	1:02:51	September 20, 2022
81	"Live at Just for Laughs Toronto"	1:11:04	October 4, 2022
82	"We All Need a Necklace That Says "Winner""	53:29	October 18, 2022
83	"Nothing Is More Terrifying Than Diane Lane Under the Tuscan Sun"	39:29	October 25, 2022
84	"30 Ways to Use Lava to Incorporate a Boyfriend Into Your Toilet"	1:03:48	November 1, 2022
85	"Living It Up for the Next Two Years Before It's All Over with Natasha Leggero & Katya^{2}"	1:15:12	November 15, 2022
86	"An American Turkey in Paris"	45:19	November 22, 2022
87	"I Left My HVAC Heart in Florida"	55:56	November 29, 2022
88	"Trimming the Tree with Ropes of Milky Goodness"	56:25	December 6, 2022
89	"Live in London at The Troxy"	1:28:51	December 13, 2022
90	"A Special Holiday Sale for Garbage Bitches Only"	1:02:39	December 27, 2022
91	"Freestyling From a Bathtub in the Desert"	47:25	January 10, 2023
92	"Langoustes Avec Serviettes Assorties"	56:41	January 24, 2023
93	"The Intoxicating Power of Desire for Our 100th Episode"	1:08:11	February 7, 2023
94	"Have a Smile for Breakfast and You'll Be Pooping Joy by Lunch"	52:24	February 21, 2023
95	"Live in Chicago from the Historic Auditorium Theatre"	1:27:16	March 7, 2023
96	"Artificial Phallus Safety in the Shower & Beyond"	54:49	March 21, 2023
97	"When You Need the Endurance to Persevere, It's Trimix!"	55:56	April 4, 2023
98	"The Dock of Dreams"	57:45	April 11, 2023
99	"Proper Posterior Grooming Techniques"	55:17	April 18, 2023
100	"A Ghost with a Goatee"	55:11	April 25, 2023
101	"A Rumspringa Spring Break"	49:12	May 2, 2023
102	"A Cup of RuPaul's Drag Race All Stars Season 8 Tea"	50:42	May 9, 2023
103	"Bringing Back Early 2000's Gay"	48:38	May 16, 2023
104	"An X-Rated X-Ray"	51:15	May 23, 2023
105	"At a Taco Bell with Mario Lopez & O.J. Simpson"	52:21	May 30, 2023
106	"Philosophers Watching Car Crashes"	50:56	June 6, 2023
107	"What Have You Done Today to Feel Proud?"	59:14	June 13, 2023
108	"We Have a Problem and Etsy is the Solution (sponsored by Etsy)"	20:26	June 15, 2023
109	"Bottoming Ain't Easy"	55:21	June 20, 2023
110	"I Need Everyone to Know That I Only Like Girls"	54:33	June 27, 2023
111	"Straight People Having Sex & Drinking Eggnog"	41:47	July 4, 2023
112	"Diving for the Hopeless Diamond"	54:23	July 11, 2023
113	"I'm on Ozempic and I'm Blowing Ass"	54:02	July 18, 2023
114	"Microphones Are Cameras for Sound"	40:05	July 25, 2023
115	"Twirlina Marie Poukette feat. Drinklina Turlington"	43:15	August 1, 2023
116	"A Luxurious Stay at North Hollywood's Famous Shateau Marmont!"	44:51	August 8, 2023
117	"The 7 Disks of Spinning Energy Inside You"	47:01	August 15, 2023
118	"The Eminently Effervescent Courtney Act (Part 1) with Katya^{2}"	43:02	August 22, 2023
119	"The Exceptionally Erudite Courtney Act (Part 2) with Katya^{2}"	39:08	August 29, 2023
120	"Lost in Scott's Eyes"	45:08	September 5, 2023
121	"You Must Be This Tall to Ride Bald Mountain"	33:48	September 12, 2023
122	"Steam Room Karens & Pickle Juice Nightcaps with Justin Martindale & Trixie^{1}"	54:59	September 19, 2023
123	"Theme Park Phobias & Home Decor Tips with Brittany Broski & Trixie^{1}"	51:37	September 26, 2023
124	"We Accept the Love We Think We Deserve"	51:22	October 3, 2023
125	"The Majesty of Live Theatre"	45:16	October 10, 2023
126	"From the Equator to Your Posterior"	43:53	October 17, 2023
127	"The Price of Yoni Eggs is Finally Falling"	47:58	October 24, 2023
128	"Boopity Boop in Your Doopity Doop"	49:06	October 31, 2023
129	"Listening to Swedish Acid Jazz in a Spaceship at Dusk on April 2, 1971"	51:23	November 7, 2023
130	"A Dazzling Woodland Sprite Dinner Party for Forest Faeries"	50:37	November 14, 2023
131	"Kathy Griffin & Her Triumphant Journey From the D-List to the PTSD-List with Trixie^{1}"	59:55	November 21, 2023
132	"Live & Leather Clad in New Orleans"	1:33:16	November 28, 2023
133	"Peri-Care for Your Derrière"	55:45	December 5, 2023
134	"It's a Tumescent Holiday Miracle!"	52:33	December 12, 2023
135	"The Darkest Night of the Sould"	50:02	December 19, 2023
136	"Soaring Like a Fabulous Bald Eagle"	43:01	December 26, 2023
137	"The Sorta New Year's Episode?"	47:05	January 2, 2024
138	"This Episode Produced & Directed by Simone Biles with Bob the Drag Queen & Katya^{2}"	57:15	January 9, 2024
139	"Circling Back for a Touch-Base to Close the Loop on the Deliverables"	47:45	January 16, 2024
140	"Christmas Dinner at Judi Dench's House with Bianca Del Rio and Katya^{2}"	58:51	January 23, 2024
141	"Higher Than Giraffe Genitalia with Dulcé Sloan and Trixie^{1}"	1:01:21	January 30, 2024
142	"Coitus With a Waffle"	58:48	February 6, 2024
143	"The Official "The Dolls are the Dolls Fan Club!""	57:24	February 13, 2024
144	"Does Our Art Threaten You?"	52:27	February 20, 2024
145	"It's a TWISTER!"	51:19	February 27, 2024
146	"You Are More Than Your Phone"	55:59	March 5, 2024
147	"A Massage That Lives Happily Ever After"	48:09	March 12, 2024
148	"Paul Blart: Mall Carp"	56:33	March 19, 2024
149	"Heels and Meals"	43:51	March 26, 2024
150	"Plane Jane and Lieutenant Brigadier General Cuhntalina Badussy with Katya^{2}"	55:15	April 2, 2024
151	"No Loads Refused: Live in Richmond, VA"	1:34:29	April 9, 2024
152	"Nellie the Potato-Faced Humpty B*tch"	52:13	April 16, 2024
153	"Welcome to the Golden Fountain of Vitality"	46:16	April 23, 2024
154	"Monét X Change & the Subtle Levels of Crazy with Trixie^{1}"	1:06:11	April 30, 2024
155	"Kelly Mantle & Two Space Heaters to the Face with Trixie^{1}"	1:06:27	May 8, 2024
156	"Tammie Brown & Ding-a-Ling in Shampoo Bottles w/ Trixie & Katya"	1:05:16	May 15, 2024
157	"The Modern Farmhouse Aesthetic with Trixie and Katya"	52:38	May 22, 2024
158	"We are the CEOs of Fierceness with Trixie and Katya"	58:46	May 29, 2024
159	"Truckstop Trysts and Bushwacked Behinds with Trixie and Katya"	46:46	June 5, 2024
160	"How to Increase Your Length and Girth in Minutes! with Katya & Fena Barbitall^{2}"	1:03:18	June 12, 2024
161	"A Sizzling Summer Reading List with Sarah Schauer and Katya^{2}"	1:02:27	June 19, 2024
162	"Queen of the Amazons with Naomi Smalls and Katya^{2}"	1:12:42	June 26, 2024
163	"The Best of Us for the Rest of Us with Trixie and Katya"	43:01	July 3, 2024
164	"A Sonic Boom Personified with Drew Afualo and Trixie^{1}"	1:07:42	July 10, 2024
165	"Sasha Colby Eats a Steak Diane Nude on the Amalfi Coast w/ Katya^{2}"	56:57	July 17, 2024
166	"Bob the Drag Queens Comprehensive Guide to Chicken Wing Etiquette with Katya^{2}"	1:08:14	July 24, 2024
167	"How to Successfully Converse with Gen Alpha with Trixie and Katya"	52:04	July 31, 2024
168	"Boofing a Sangria in Anaheim with Trixie and Katya"	57:20	August 7, 2024
169	"Kristen Schaal Is Lost in an Abandoned Warehouse With Katya^{2}"	1:01:54	August 14, 2024
170	"Ts Madison and the Art of Bore Worm Seduction with Katya^{2}"	1:12:56	August 20, 2024
171	"Scarlet Envy's Mapquest to Fire Island with Katya^{2}"	1:04:25	August 28, 2024
172	"Courtney Act's Fall Rhinestone Jackaroo Fashion Tips with Katya^{2}"	1:10:26	September 4, 2024
173	"Jinkx Monsoon Silencing One's Mind with Bebe Neuwirth with Katya^{2}"	1:08:21	September 10, 2024
174	"Raja Gemini: The Elusive Chanteuse with Katya^{2}"	1:04:41	September 17, 2024
175	"Sapphira Cristál's Mermaid Erotica with Katya (Part 1)^{2}"	1:07:19	September 24, 2024
176	"Sapphira Cristál's Chicken Carbonara For Two with Katya (Part 2)^{2}"	1:00:37	October 1, 2024
177	"Jimbo Interprets Katya's Dreams with Katya^{2}"	1:06:01	October 8, 2024
178	"Joel Kim Booster Loathes Katya's Movie Recommendations (Part 1) with Katya^{2}"	1:00:07	October 15, 2024
179	"Joel Kim Booster's Atlantis Cruise Matinée Nightmare (Part 2) with Katya^{2}"	50:01	October 22, 2024
180	"The B*tch is Back and She's Got Cake with Trixie and Katya"	57:28	October 29, 2024
181	"Nicole Kidman Presents: The Bald and the Beautiful with Trixie and Katya"	1:02:08	November 5, 2024
182	"Timothee Chalamet: An Alien Who Lives Amongst Us? with Trixie and Katya"	1:06:08	November 12, 2024
183	"Megan Stalter & the Hotness of Kindness with Trixie and Katya"	1:05:45	November 19, 2024
184	"Gretchen Felker-Martin's Cornucopia of Horror with Katya^{2}"	36:14	November 26, 2024
185	"Repressed Theatre Gays with Joe and Andrew from the Good Children pod with Trixie^{1}"	1:04:05	December 3, 2024
186	"Bruce Vilanch's New Hyundai Has a Blind Spot with Trixie^{1}"	51:56	December 10, 2024
187	"Bob the Drag Queen's Dream Deferred with Trixie^{1}"	59:36	December 18, 2024
188	"A Holiday Sausage Express Delivery with Trixie and Katya"	52:50	December 25, 2024
189	"Men Lie for It, Women Cry for It:"Noodle Madness!" with Trixie and Katya"	50:26	January 1, 2025
190	"Kelly Mantle's Trixie the Cable Girl Nightmare with Trixie and Katya"	54:30	January 8, 2025
191	"Escaping L.A. with Six Wigs and a PS5 with Trixie and Katya"	45:15	January 15, 2025
192	"The Queen Mary's Evacuee Jerk Game with Trixie and Katya"	56:31	January 22, 2025
193	"Hot Loads Delivered Straight to Your Door with Trixie and Katya"	57:40	January 29, 2025
194	"Finding Balance Through Dialectism & Chicken with Trixie and Katya"	51:33	February 5, 2025
195	"Employing Pillow Talk to Build Intimacy with Trixie and Katya"	1:01:20	February 12, 2025
196	"All Hail the Flying Spaghetti Monster with Trixie and Katya"	48:30	February 19, 2025
197	"The Bald and the Beautiful: Tokyo Drift with Trixie and Katya"	54:23	February 26, 2025
198	"A Blueberry Bayou Adventure with Trixie and Katya"	52:55	March 5, 2025
199	"Are You Happy Now? with Trixie and Katya"	1:09:47	March 12, 2025
200	"Huffin' at Macca's with Trixie and Katya"	55:02	March 19, 2025
201	"A Public Service Announcement for Our Fans with Trixie and Katya"	1:00:11	March 26, 2025
202	"The Bald Driving School: Where Automotive Dreams Come True with Trixie and Katya"	1:00:08	April 2, 2025
203	"Tee-El-Cee Presents: Extreme Rumspringa! with Trixie and Katya"	51:10	April 9, 2025
204	"Download the "CruciPeep" App Today! with Trixie and Katya"	57:31	April 16, 2025
205	"You're Someone or You're Someone Else with Trixie and Katya"	52:48	April 23, 2025
206	"Take Us Back to Gawd's Country with Trixie and Katya"	51:12	April 30, 2025
207	"With Love, The Balds with Trixie and Katya"	53:11	May 7, 2025
208	"Losing Your Virginity at a Ruby Tuesday with Michael Henry & Tim Murray"	1:00:44	May 14, 2025
209	"One Small Step for Man, One Giant Leap for Gays with Trixie and Katya"	55:15	May 21, 2025
210	"Lifting the Gossamer Curtain to the Other Side with Trixie and Katya"	53:16	May 28, 2025
211	"Kristen Schaal and the Relativity of Time & Collarbones with Trixie and Katya"	1:10:16	June 4, 2025
212	"Welcome to Bald's Gym! with Trixie and Katya"	1:04:26	June 11, 2025
213	"Book a Ride with Beyonce's Balloons Today! with Trixie and Katya"	1:01:39	June 18, 2025
214	"Pokémon 101 is Now in Session with Trixie and Katya"	1:00:00	June 25, 2025
215	"Deep Emotional Healing Through Home Decor with Trixie and Katya"	52:33	July 2, 2025
216	"Tammie Brown's Tallywhacker Extravaganza with Trixie and Katya"	1:00:52	July 9, 2025
217	"Stockholm Syndrome: Live from Sweden with Trixie and Katya!"	1:46:04	July 16, 2025
218	"The Land of a Thousand Fjords: Live from Norway with Trixie and Katya"	1:43:56	July 23, 2025
219	"RuPaul's Drag Race Season 7 Ep 1: "Origins" with Trixie and Katya"	1:13:02	July 29, 2025
220	"RuPaul's Drag Race Season 7 Ep 2: "Trauma & Moby" with Trixie and Katya"	1:07:06	August 5, 2025
221	"RuPaul's Drag Race Season 7 Ep 3: "ShakesQueer, Sewing, & Excuses" with Trixie and Katya"	1:03:34	August 12, 2025
222	"RuPaul's Drag Race Season 7 Ep 4: "A Soufflé of Judgement & Humiliation" with Trixie and Katya"	1:01:35	August 19, 2025
223	"RuPaul's Drag Race Season 7 Eps 5-7: "Wigs, Woe, & Redemption" with Trixie and Katya"	1:11:52	August 26, 2025
224	"RuPaul's Drag Race Season 7 Ep 8: "Cosmic Twins Rising" with Trixie and Katya"	54:15	September 2, 2025
225	"RuPaul's Drag Race Season 7 Eps 9 & 10: "Prancing, Poo, & Panache" with Trixie and Katya"	1:02:19	September 9, 2025
226	"RuPaul's Drag Race Season 7 Eps 11 to 14: "Le Finalé Débonnaire Extraordinaire" with Trixie & Katya"	1:11:09	September 16, 2025
227	"Wigs, Weapons & Wisdom: A Three-Act Tête-à-Tête with Trixie and Katya"	55:05	September 23, 2025
228	"Irene the Alien's Ephemeral Visit to the Terrestrial Realm with Katya^{2}"	59:18	September 30, 2025
229	"Bob the Drag Queen Heralds the Birth of Katya's Pussycat with Katya^{2}"	1:08:11	October 7, 2025
230	"Bosco and Goblin Drag Prerequisites with Katya^{2}"	1:10:17	October 14, 2025
231	"Let No Bannister Go Un-Cobwebbed with Trixie and Katya"	1:02:08	October 21, 2025
232	"Elvira's Planet of the Glamazonian Ghouls with Trixie^{1}"	46:14	October 28, 2025
233	"Your Fingers are Rivers of Intention with Trixie and Katya"	56:18	November 4, 2025
234	"The Trixie Mattel Center for Turntable Excellence with Trixie and Katya"	51:09	November 11, 2025
235	"Observational Cinematic Compulsion Disorder with Trixie and Katya"	1:01:20	November 18, 2025
236	"Kim Chi's Love Affair with Public Libraries with Trixie and Katya"	1:11:52	November 25, 2025
237	"The Cream Nation Sensation! with Trixie and Katya"	1:02:54	December 2, 2025
238	"Lushious Massacr's Plan for World Peace Through the Booty Hole with Trixie and Katya"	1:07:24	December 9, 2025
239	"How to Use Double Entendres with Trixie and Katya"	55:37	December 16, 2025
240	"Daphne Guinness and the Anarchy of Creativity with Katya^{2}"	1:02:41	December 23, 2025
241	"A Paranormal New Year's Eve with Trixie and Katya"	54:07	December 30, 2025

==== Revisited episodes ====
During weeks where there was no new episode to air, re-runs of old episodes were released onto the feed.

No.	Title	Length	Release date
1	"Revisiting our Very First Episode"	1:01:45	May 25, 2021
2	"Revisiting the Bug-Eyed TikTok Bitch with Brittany Broski"	59:55	October 5, 2021
3	"Revisiting the Making of Jiz & the Filming of Jiz with Jeff Maccubbin"	59:56	October 12, 2021
4	"Revisiting the Comedic Genius of Macy Rodman"	1:10:43	October 19, 2021
5	"Revisiting the Art of Dating: Fisting is the New Kissing"	54:06	March 29, 2022
6	"What We Do in the Shadows is Back, Baby! Revisiting our Chat with Harvey Guillén"	1:09:46	July 28, 2022
7	"Revisiting Glory Holes & Catsup with Jeff Maccubbin & Ron Hill"	1:05:33	August 23, 2022

==== Awards and nominations ====
Year	Award	Category	Result	Ref
2021	Queerty Awards	Podcast	Won	
2021	Canadian Podcast Awards	Outstanding Foreign Series	Won	
2022	Queerty Awards	Podcast	Runner-up	
2022	Webby Awards	Best Podcast Ad	Won	
2022	Webby Awards	Best Podcast Ad (People's Voice)	Won	
2023	Signal Awards	Best Video Podcast	Bronze	
2023	Signal Awards	Best Co-Host Team	Gold	
2023	Signal Awards	Best "Stan" Podcast	Silver	
2023	Signal Awards	Best LGBTQ+ Podcast	Silver	
2023	GLAAD Media Awards	Outstanding Podcast	Nominated	
2023	Shorty Awards	Comedy Podcast	Audience Honor	
2024	Webby Awards	Podcasts (Comedy)	Won	

== Awards and nominations ==
Year	Award	Category	Result
2017	Streamy Awards	Show of the Year	Nominated
2019	Streamy Awards	Unscripted Series	Nominated
2020	Streamy Awards	Show of the Year	Nominated
2020	Streamy Awards	Unscripted Series	Won
2021	Streamy Awards	Show of the Year	Nominated
2021	Streamy Awards	Unscripted Series	Nominated
2022	Streamy Awards	Show of the Year	Nominated
2022	Streamy Awards	Unscripted Series	Nominated
2022	Streamy Awards	Editing	Nominated
2023	Streamy Awards	Show of the Year	Nominated
2024	Queerty Awards	Web Series	Runner-up

== Notes ==
1. Katya was absent for this episode
2. Trixie was absent for this episode
