= Queens of Clubs =

Episode of RuPaul's Drag Race All Stars

- RuPaul's Drag Race All Stars episode
- Episode no.: Season 4 Series 4 Episode 7
- Original air date: January 25, 2019

Guest appearances
- Susanne Bartsch; Rita Ora

Episode chronology
- RuPaul's Drag Race All Stars (season 4)

"Queens of Clubs" is the seventh episode of the fourth season of the American television series RuPaul's Drag Race All Stars. It originally aired on January 25, 2019. The episode's main challenge tasks the contestants with teaming up to create and host nightclubs. Event producer Susanne Bartsch and British singer-songwriter Rita Ora are guest judges.

Valentina is eliminated from the competition by Latrice Royale, who places in the top two and beats Trinity the Tuck in a lip-sync contest to "You Spin Me Round (Like a Record)" (1984) by the British band Dead or Alive.

== Episode ==
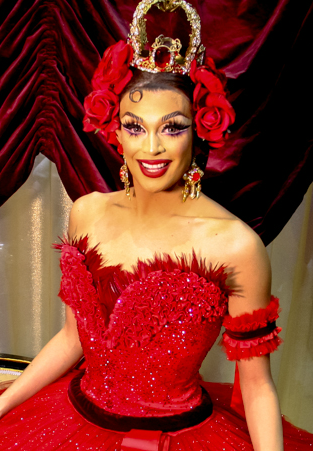
Valentina (pictured at RuPaul's DragCon LA in 2017) is eliminated from the competition by Latrice Royale.

The contestants return to the competition after Latrice Royale's return to the competition on the previous episode. On a new day, RuPaul greets the group and reveals the main challenge, which tasks the contestants with teaming up to create and host nightclubs. Each team must decide on names, decor, entertainment, and signature cocktails. Before leaving, RuPaul reveals that Susanne Bartsch and Rita Ora are guest judges. As a welcome back gift, Latrice Royale is tasked with pairing the contestants, then deciding which team to join. She pairs Naomi Smalls and Valentina, Manila Luzon and Trinity the Tuck, and Monét X Change and Monique Heart, then joins Manila Luzon and Trinity the Tuck.

The contestant get into teams and start to develop their concepts, then paint and decorate their spaces. On elimination day, the contestants make final preparations in the workroom for the nightclub and fashion show presentations. The contestants then present their concepts to RuPaul, Michelle Visage, Carson Kressley, and the guest judges. Monét X Change and Monique Heart present The Blackhole. Naomi Smalls and Valentina present Club 96. Latrice Royale, Manila Luzon, and Trinity The Tuck present Club Hive.

On the main stage, RuPaul welcomes fellow judges Visage and Kressley, as well as guest judges Bartsch and Ora. RuPaul shares the assignment of the main challenge and the runway category ("Plastique Fantastique"), then the fashion show commences. The judges deliver their critiques, then share the results with the contestants. Latrice Royale and Trinity the Tuck place in the top and Naomi Smalls and Valentina place in the bottom. The contestants deliberate in the workroom, then Latrice Royale and Trinity the Tuck face off in a lip-sync contest to "You Spin Me Round (Like a Record)" (1984) by Dead or Alive. Latrice Royale wins the lip-sync and decides to eliminate Valentina from the competition. Valentina returns to the workroom and uses lipstick to write a message on the mirror for the remaining contestants.

== Production ==
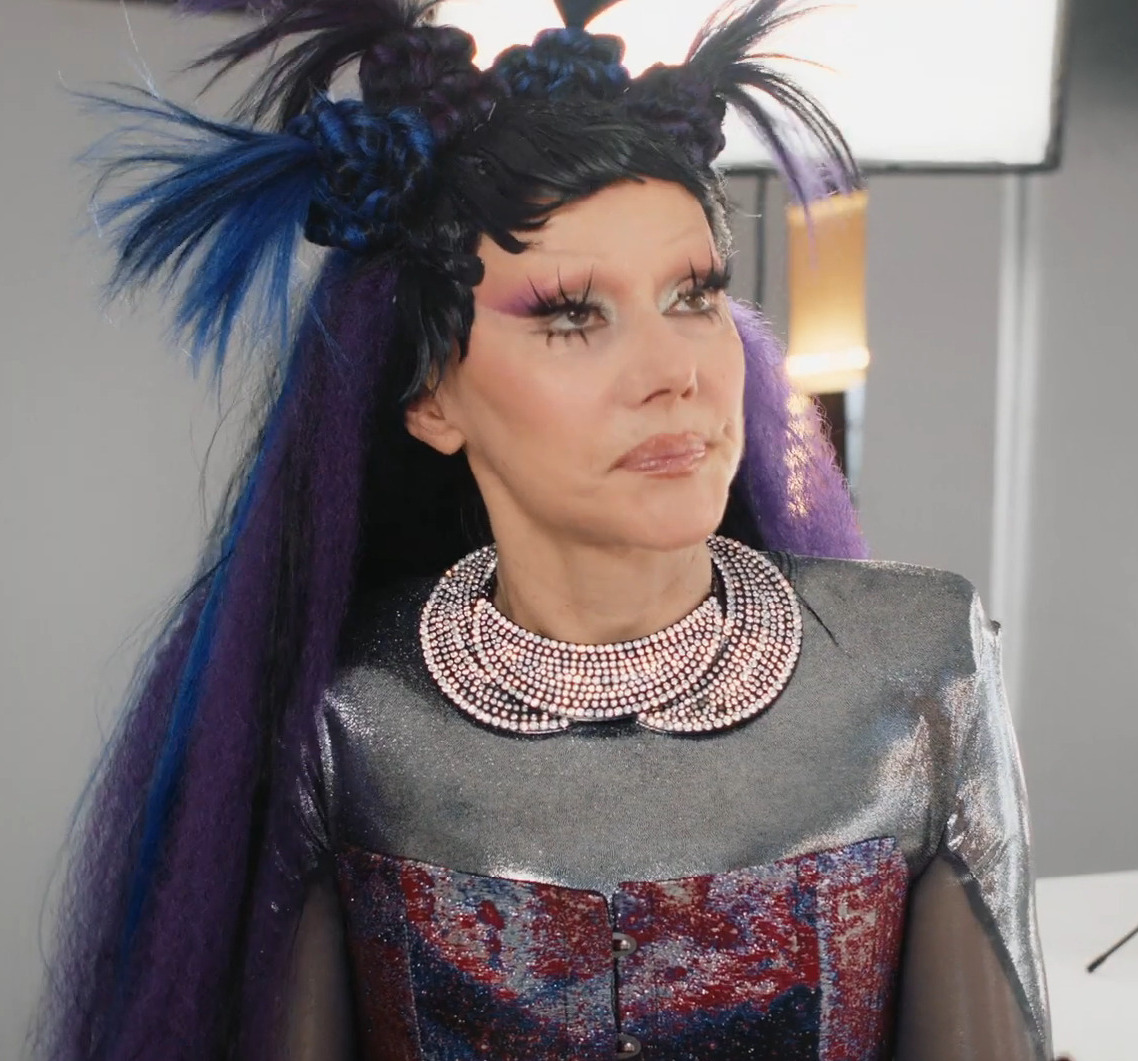
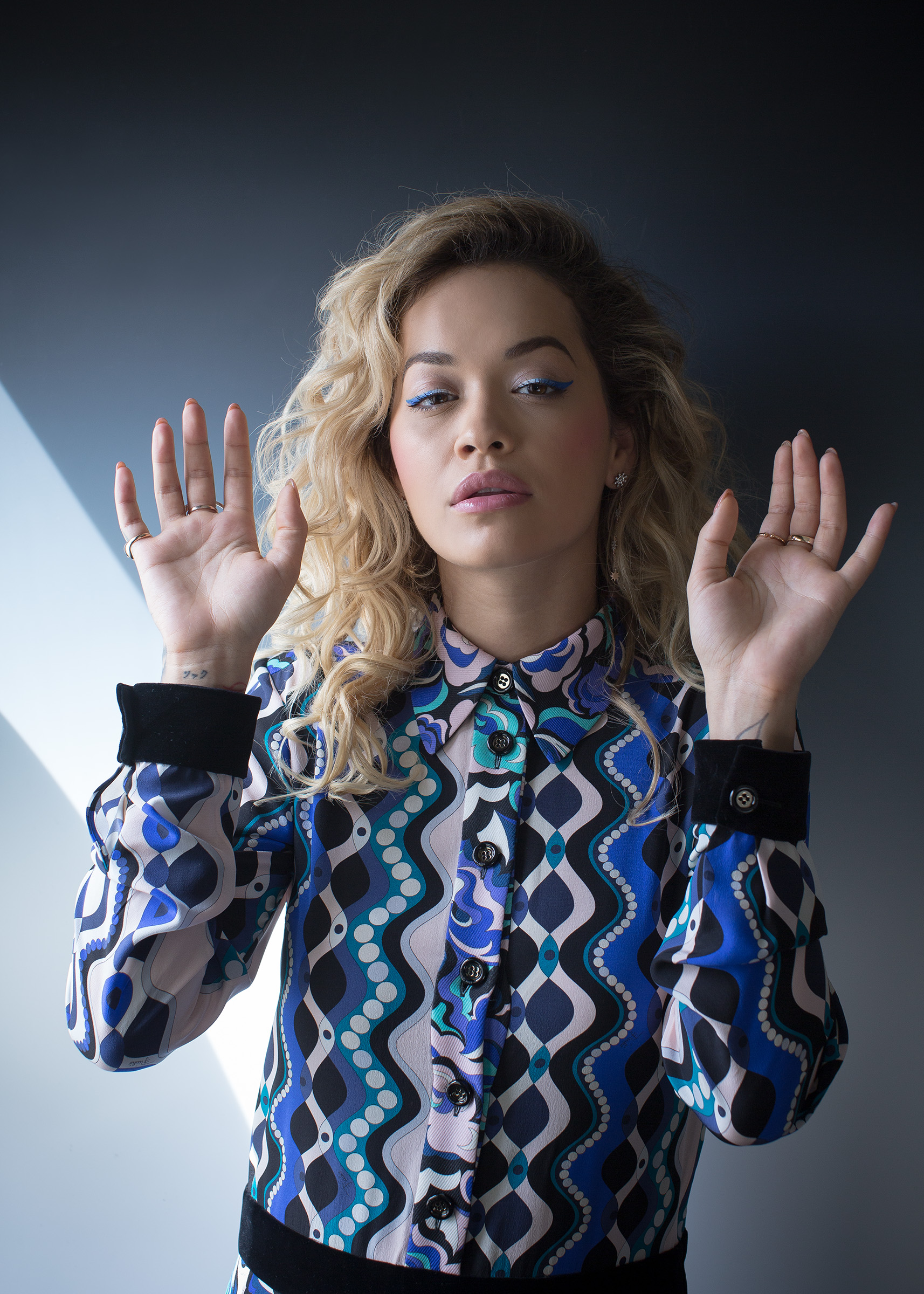
Susanne Bartsch (left, pictured in 2012) and Rita Ora (right, pictured in 2018) are guest judges.

The episode originally aired on January 25, 2019.

The Blackhole has an alien in an incubator. The signature cocktail is the Beam Me Up. Club 96 has potted plants, compact discs displayed on the wall, a neon sign, and a disco ball. The signature cocktail is served in a tall glass with a straw. The bee-themed Club Hive has a honeycomb design, a strip spelling bee contest, and a release of bees.

Bruno Alcantara and Shawn Morales are among members of the Pit Crew.

=== Fashion ===
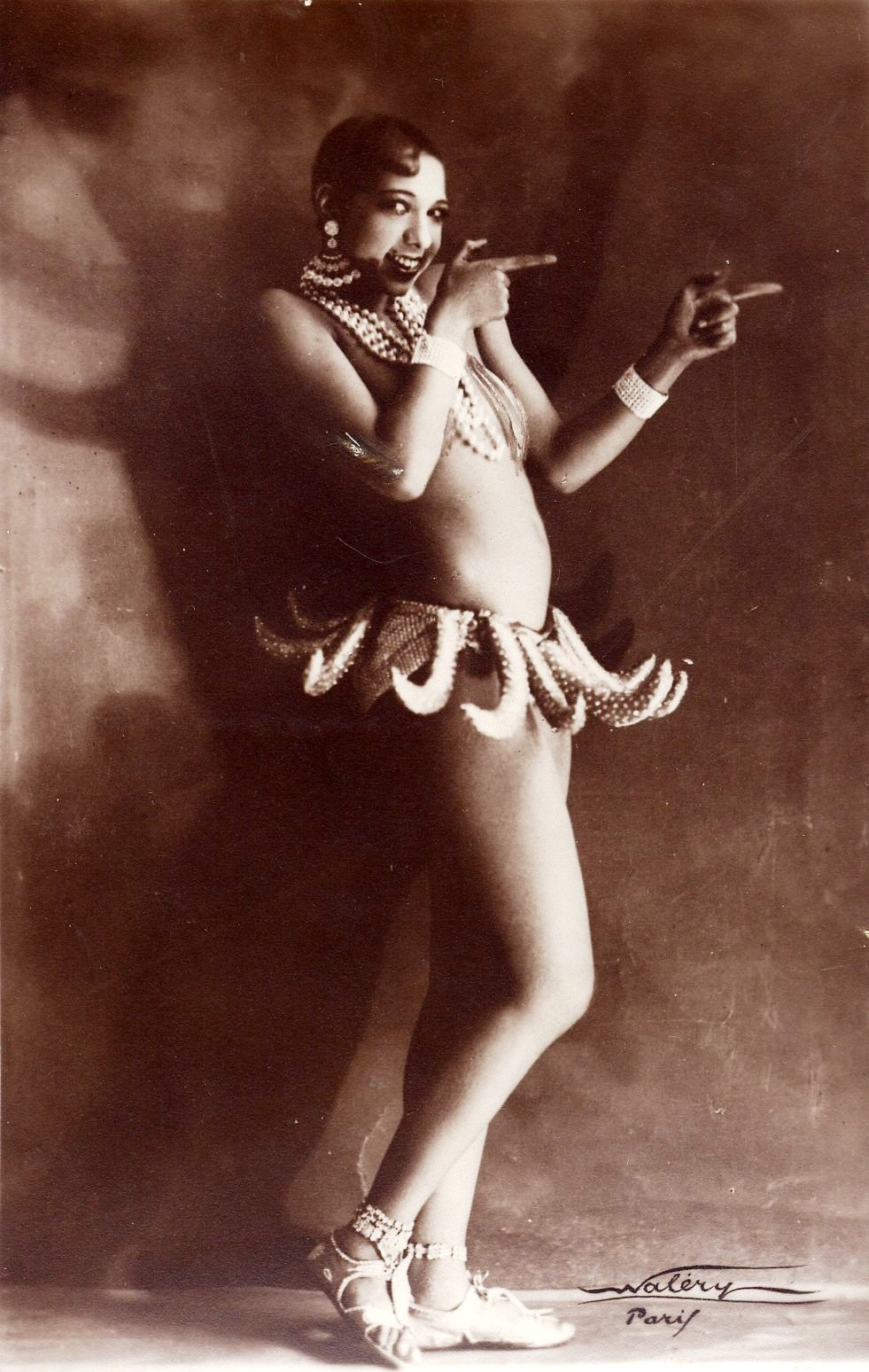
Monique Heart presents a look inspired by entertainer Josephine Baker (pictured in her banana costume from the Folies Bergère production Un Vent de Folie, 1927).

In the workroom, RuPaul wears a pink-and-white suit and red boots. For the main stage, RuPaul has an asymmetrical long blue dress.

For the main challenge, Monét X Change's outfit is black, white, and yellow. She also wears large hoop earrings and an afro. Monique Heart has a yellow outfit, alien fingers, and a short purple wig. Naomi Smalls wears hoop earrings and a brown wig. Valentina has a colorful blue-and-pink outfit. Latrice Royale, Manila Luzon, and Trinity the Tuck have black-and-yellow outfits. Latrice Royale has a blonde wig. Manila Luzon has a bow on her dress and a dark wig. Trinity the Tuck has a purple wig, matching gloves, and a headpiece with feathers.

For the fashion show, Latrice Royale wears a purple latex outfit with a ponytail made of balls. Manila Luzon has a cellophane outfit with a fruit basket as a headpiece and bananas as earrings. Trinity the Tuck wears a pink bodysuit resembling bubble gum. Naomi Smalls has a yellow coat with a matching wig and a pink-and-red outfit. Valentina wears a short blue dress with a 'Miss Venezuela' sash. She carries a bouquet of roses. Monét X Change has a futuristic-warrior-inspired outfit and a pink wig. Monique Heart wears a banana-themed outfit inspired by entertainer Josephine Baker.

For the lip-sync, Latrice Royale has a gold-and-green bodysuit and a blonde wig. Trinity the Tuck resembles an old woman with sagging breasts. She wears a robe with an animal print and a white wig. She uses a walker and removes her robe to reveal underwear.

== Reception ==
Kate Kulzick of The A.V. Club gave the episode a rating of 'B+' and said the hosting challenge allowed Latrice Royale to demonstrate "what has made her so successful outside of Drag Race". Writing for Vulture, Matt Rogers rated the episode four out of five stars. Patrick Crowley of Billboard said the episode had "one of the most practical challenges in the show's history". Elena Cau of Screen Rant said some fans "were not impressed" with Trinity the Tuck's performance during the lip-sync contest. Sam Brooks ranked the "You Spin Me Round (Like a Record)" performance number 110 in The Spinoff's 2019 "definitive ranking" of 162 Drag Race lip-syncs to date.
