= Super Queen Grand Finale =

Episode of RuPaul's Drag Race All Stars

- RuPaul's Drag Race All Stars episode
- Episode no.: Season 4 Episode 10
- Presented by: RuPaul
- Original air date: February 15, 2019

Guest appearances
- Todrick Hall (guest judge); Alaska Thunderfuck; Chad Michaels; Trixie Mattel

"Super Queen Grand Finale" is the tenth episode of the fourth season of the American television series RuPaul's Drag Race All Stars. It originally aired on February 15, 2019. The episode's main challenge tasks the contestants with writing, recording, and performing choreography to original verses to RuPaul's song "Super Queen". Todrick Hall is a guest judge. The show's former winners Chad Michaels, Alaska Thunderfuck, and Trixie Mattel also make guest appearances. After a final lip-sync contest to "Fighter" (2003) by Christina Aguilera, Monét X Change and Trinity the Tuck are both declared the season's winners.

== Episode ==
The contestants return to the Werk Room after Latrice Royale's elimination on the previous episode. Monique Heart reveals that she would have eliminated Latrice Royale from the competition had she won the lip-sync contest. On a new day, RuPaul greets the group and reveals the final challenge, which tasks the contestants with writing, recording, and performing choreography to original verses to RuPaul's song "Super Queen". RuPaul shares that Todrick Hall will be assisting with choreography and the competitors will join RuPaul and Michelle Visage on the podcast RuPaul: What's the Tee?.

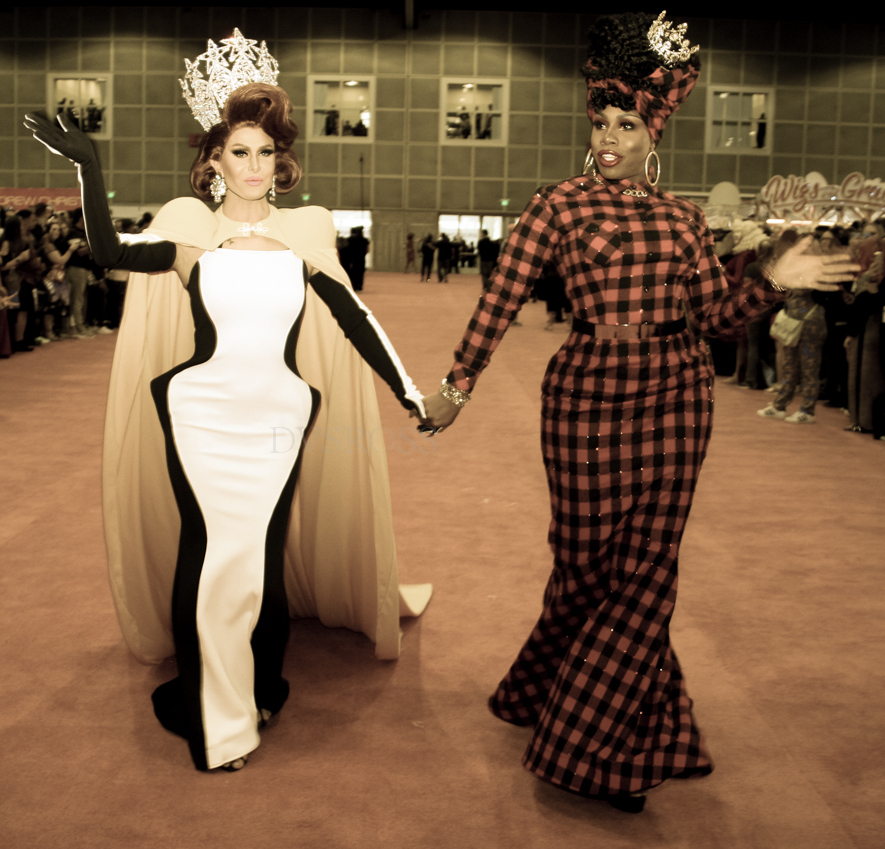
The season's winners, Trinity the Tuck (left) and Monét X Change (right) at RuPaul's DragCon LA in 2019

The contestants start to write their verses, then rehearse choreography with Hall and backup dancers on the main stage. The contestants also meet with RuPaul and Visage to record the podcast segments. Back in the Werk Room, the contestants are greeted by the show's former winners Chad Michaels (season 1), Alaska Thunderfuck (season 2), and Trixie Mattel (season 3). After getting acquainted, the former winners leave and the competitors make final preparations for the performance and fashion show. The contestants discuss their progress during the season.

On the main stage, RuPaul welcomes fellow judges Visage, Carson Kressley, and Ross Mathews, as well as guest judge Hall. RuPaul shares the assignment of the main stage, then the "Super Queen" performance commences. Chad Michaels, Alaska Thunderfuck, and Trixie Mattel make guest appearances. RuPaul shares the runway category ("All Star Eleganza"), then the fashion show commences. After the contestants present their look, the judges deliver their critiques. RuPaul asks the contestants to say why they should be crowned the season's winner. The judges deliberate, then share the results with the contestants. Monique Heart and Naomi Smalls are eliminated, leaving Monét X Change and Trinity the Tuck as the top two contestants. The finalists face off in a lip-sync contest to "Fighter" (2003) by Christina Aguilera. Monét X Change and Trinity the Tuck are both declared winners.

== Production and broadcast ==
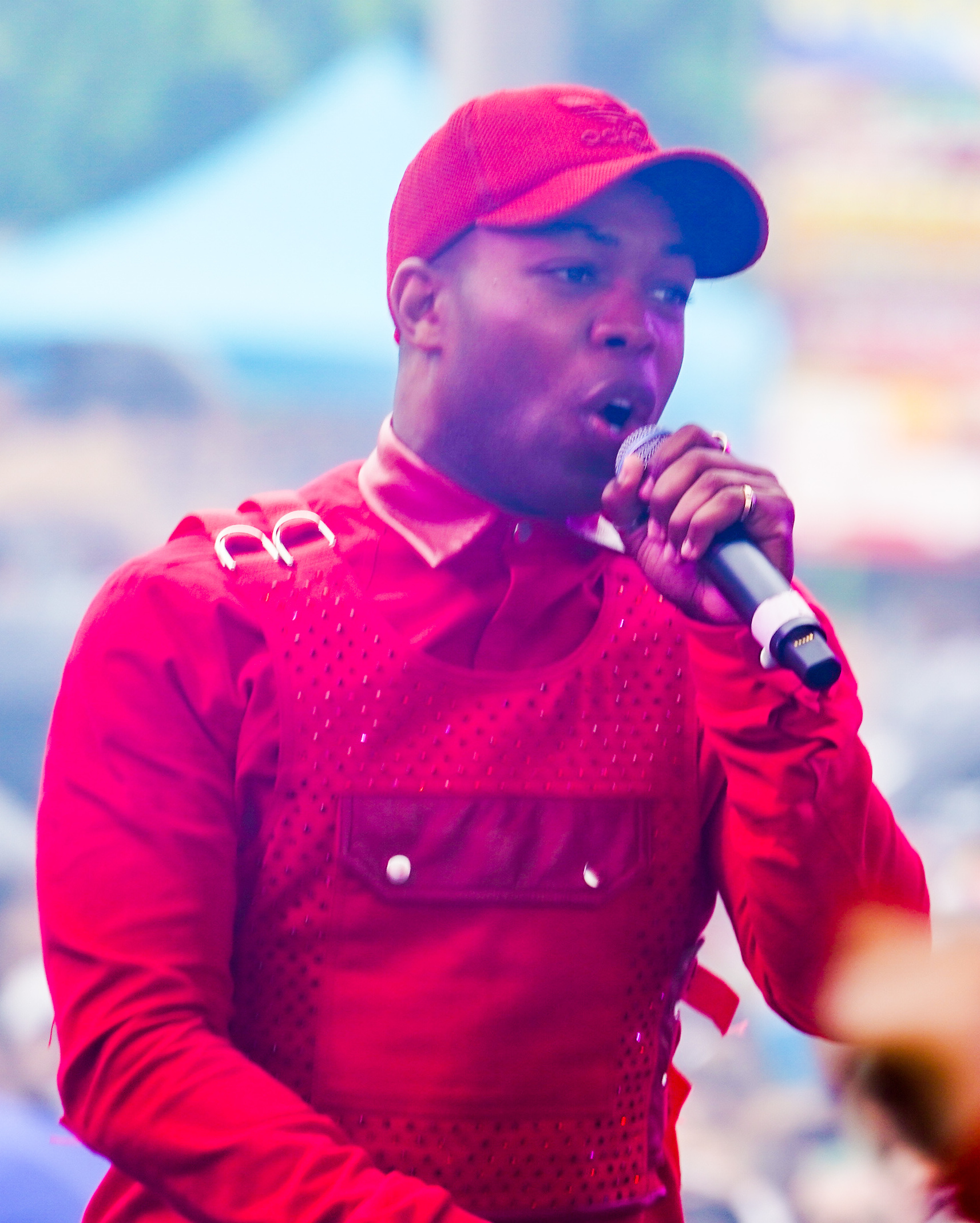
Todrick Hall (pictured in 2019) is a guest judge.

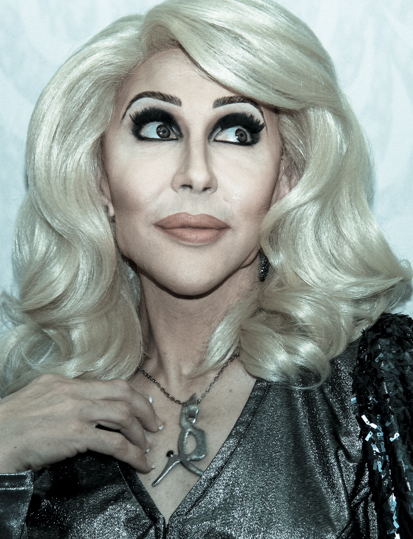
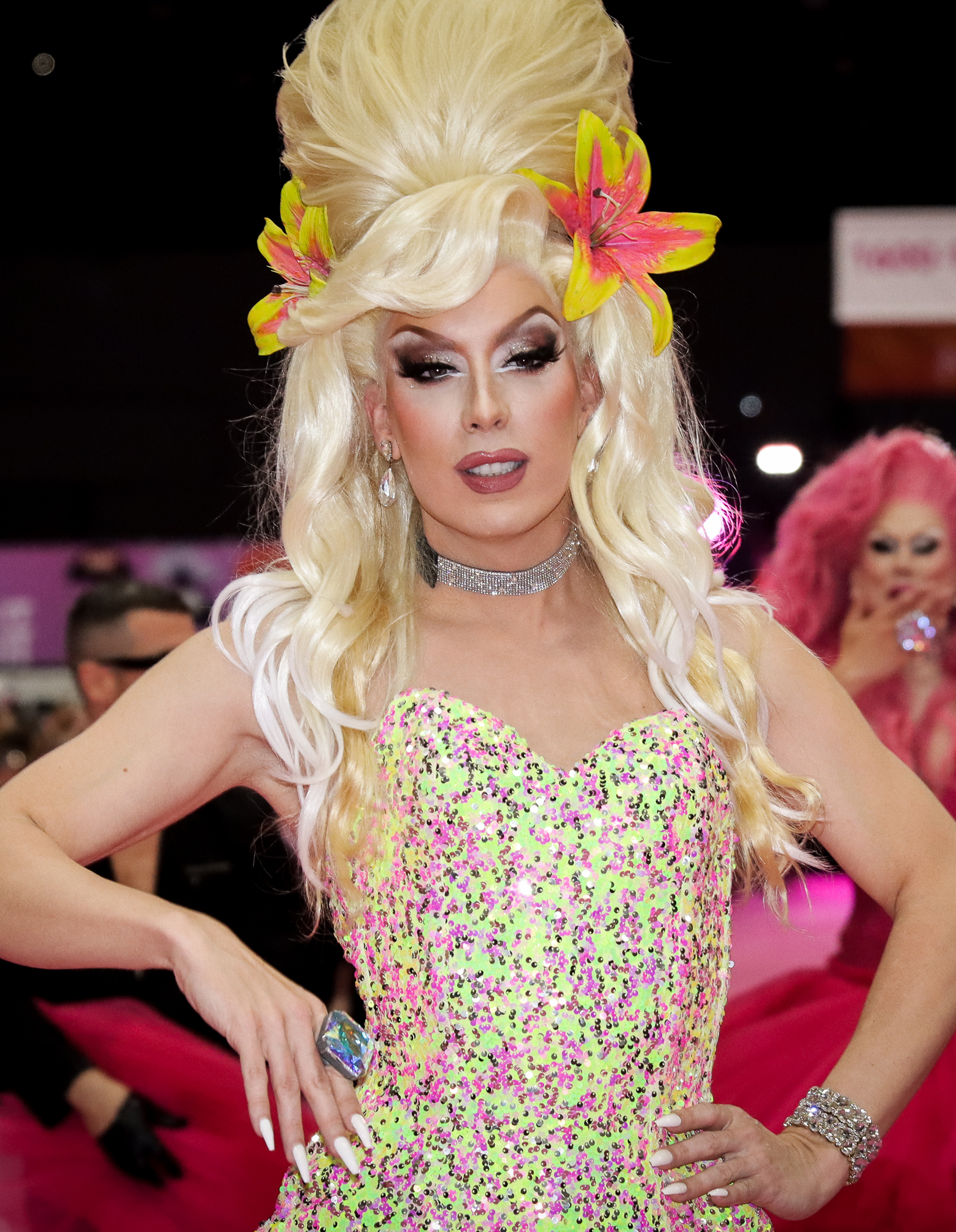
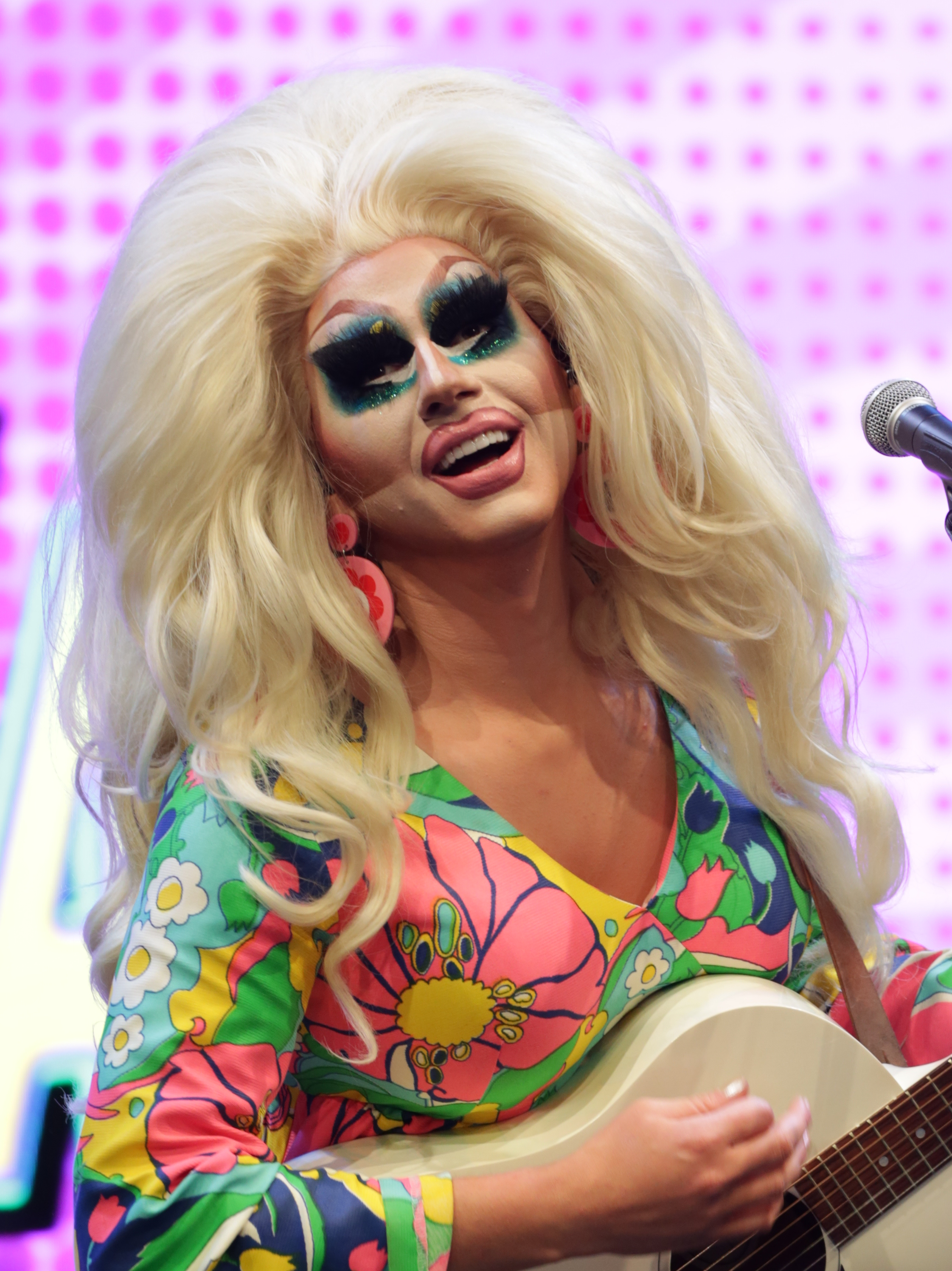
The show's former winners Chad Michaels (left), Alaska Thunderfuck (center), and Trixie Mattel (right) make guest appearances.

The episode originally aired on February 15, 2019. It features the first time in RuPaul's Drag Race or All Stars that two winners are crowned. Both winners were surprised by the tie, since multiple endings were filmed.

During the final lip-sync, Monét X Change jumps into a split and later removes a blonde pussycat wig to reveal another blonde pussycat wig. She became the first person of color to join the show's Hall of Fame.

Costume designer Patrick Isorena shared on social media a photograph of what Manila Luzon would have worn for the "Super Queen" music video had she remained in the competition.

=== Fashion ===
In the Werk Room, RuPaul wears a blue-and-yellow suit and a blue dress shirt. Chad Michaels has a gold outfit and a blonde wig. Alaska Thunderfuck has a black outfit with a matching hat and a blonde wig. Trixie Mattel wears a pink outfit, large hoop earrings, and a long blonde wig. When the former winners exit the Werk Room, Alaska Thunderfuck carries an umbrella with the text "Team Katya" (referring to Katya Zamolodchikova). For the main stage, RuPaul wears a silver dress with stars and a blonde wig.

For "Super Queen", Monét X Change wears a red-and-silver outfit. Monique Heart has a black outfit and an orange wig. Naomi Smalls's outfit is blue, orange, and white, and she wears a blue wig. Trinity the Tuck has a silver outfit and a matching headpiece. For the fashion show, Monét X Change wears a purple dress and blonde dreadlocks. Monique Heart has a black dress with matching gloves and a blonde wig. Naomi Smalls wears a purple dress and a matching hat. Trinity the Tuck has a blue dress with teacups on her chest and a brown wig.

For the final lip-sync, Monét X Change wears a red bodysuit and matching high-heeled shoes. Trinity the Tuck has a black-and-green outfit and a brown wig.

== Reception ==
Writing for Vulture, Matt Rogers rated the episode three out of five stars. Metro said the final result "divided" viewers. Michael Cooper of LA Weekly wrote, "The tie was the final surprise in a season of twists and turns that caused many fans to be unhappy with how things turned out." Sarah McKenna Barry of Gay Community News said the episode "saw one of the most controversial decisions in Drag Race Herstory". Joey Nolfi included Monét X Change's lip-sync performance in Entertainment Weekly's list of "the best wig reveals of 2019 so far". In 2022, Michelle Konopka Alonzo of Screen Rant said her performance had one of the show's best lip-sync reveals. Sam Brooks ranked the "Fighter" performance number 36 in The Spinoff's 2019 "definitive ranking" of 162 Drag Race lip-sync contests to date.
