= Money exchange =

Money exchange can refer to:

- Bureau de change, a business where people can exchange one currency for another
- Foreign exchange market

== See also ==
- Monét X Change (Kevin Akeem Bertin, born 1990), American drag queen
