= Unapologetically (EP) =

EP by Monét X Change
- Released: February 22, 2019
- Length: 9:39
- Label: The Randall House
- Producer: Eritza Laues (exec.); Soundwavve; Christopher "Cannon" Mapp

Unapologetically is the debut EP by American drag queen Monét X Change, released on February 22, 2019, through Randall House. It was released following her win (along with Trinity the Tuck) of season 4 of RuPaul's Drag Race All Stars. It was accompanied by a short film, and for this reason, has been called a "visual EP". Monét X Change co-wrote all four tracks.

== Background ==
Monét X Change told Vulture that she wanted to "move in a different direction" from her single "Soak It Up" and "make an album that really speaks to the different makeups in my music library". This influenced the tracks to be of different moods and styles, with a classical introductory track, two upbeat songs and a calmer closing track. She also spoke of her desire for the release to help her to be seen as an artist and musician like Brazilian singer and drag queen Pabllo Vittar, while also being influenced by artists like SZA, H.E.R. and Beyoncé.

== Music ==
Billboard characterized the opening track as Monét X Change's "baritone, classically-trained opera chops singing 'Ave Maria' underneath a spoken word that speaks to her inner struggle with religion". Monét X Change said that she "channeled" Sylvester "up in that club in the '80s" with "that disco wig and the all white" for the upbeat "There for You", while saying about the following song, "Beyoncé": "Every gay man feels like they are Beyoncé. That's what that song leans into." The track was also called a "club banger that summons the energy of Queen Bey herself" by Pride.com. The final track, "Gently", was described by Monét X Change as "a soft, romantic, sexy song" and by Billboard as a "nod to X Change's enchantment with R&B".

== Track listing ==
Credits sourced from Spotify

| No. | Title | Writer(s) | Producers | Length |
|---|---|---|---|---|
| 1. | "Ave Maria (Intro)" | Kevin Bertin; Franz Schubert | | 1:34 |
| 2. | "There for You" | Eritza Laues | Akira Shelton; SoundwaVve | 2:20 |
| 3. | "Beyoncé" | Laues | Soundwavve | 2:56 |
| 4. | "Gently" | Laues | Shelton | 2:49 |
| Total length: | | | | 9:39 |
