= Beyoncé (disambiguation) =

Beyoncé Knowles-Carter (born 1981) is an American singer, songwriter, actress and businesswoman.

Beyoncé may also refer to:

- Beyoncé (album), her self-titled 2013 studio album
- "Beyoncé", a song by Monét X Change from the 2019 EP Unapologetically
- Beyoncé: The Ultimate Performer, a 2006 live DVD by Beyoncé Knowles
- MC Beyoncé, former stage name for Brazilian singer-songwriter Ludmila Oliveira da Silva (born 1995)
- Beyoncé Defreitas, track and field athlete from the British Virgin Islands (born 2001)
- Beyoncé Ajomiwe, contestant on Nigerian Idol (Season 6)

== See also ==
- Beyincé
