= Queen of Queens =

Remix album by RuPaul
- Released: April 29, 2019
- Length: 32:48
- Label: RuCo, Inc.

Singles from Queen of Queens
- 1. "Super Queen (Stockholm Mix)" Released: February 17, 2019; 2. "Queens Everywhere" Released: May 18, 2019

Queen of Queens is a remix album by American drag queen and recording artist RuPaul. It was released by RuCo, Inc. on April 29, 2019.

== Composition ==
The album has a total of eight tracks. Three are three versions of the previously unreleased song "Queens Everywhere", including a cappella and instrumental versions. There are two remixes of both "American" and "Super Queen", and one of "Call Me Mother". "Super Queen" was featured on the fourth season of RuPaul's Drag Race All Stars.

"Queens Everywhere" is the song used as a challenge for the contestants in episode 12 of the 11th season of RuPaul's Drag Race.

== Track listing ==
1. "Queens Everywhere" - 3:07
2. "American (DJ Gomi Remix)" - 5:31
3. "Call Me Mother (DJ Gomi Dub)" - 5:58
4. "Super Queen (Stockholm Mix)" - 3:18
5. "Queens Everywhere (Acappella)" - 3:08
6. "American (DJ Gomi Remix Instrumental)" - 5:33
7. "Queens Everywhere (Instrumental)" - 3:07
8. "Super Queen (Stockholm Acappella)" - 3:06

Track listing adapted from the iTunes Store
