= Beyincé =

Beyincé is a Louisiana Creole surname. Notable people with the surname include:

- Agnéz Beyincé (née Deréon; 1909–1979), mother of American businesswoman Tina Knowles and grandmother of singers Beyoncé and Solange Knowles
- Angela Beyincé (born 1976), American songwriter, actress and music executive, niece of Tina Knowles and cousin of Beyoncé and Solange Knowles

== See also ==
- Beyoncé (disambiguation)
