= Huluween Dragstravaganza =

2022 variety show

- Genre: Variety show
- Written by: Jackie Beat; Justin Martindale; Trace Slobotkin
- Creative directors: George Cawood; Taylor Greeson
- Presented by: Ginger Minj; Monét X Change
- Starring: Lady Bunny; Manila Luzon; Mo Heart; Jackie Beat; Selene Luna; Jujubee; Landon Cider; Justin Martindale; Mario Diaz
- Country of origin: United States
- Original language: English
- No. of episodes: 1

Production
- Executive producers: Taylor Greeson; George Cawood; Joshua Harris; Rajan Patel
- Camera setup: Multi-camera
- Running time: 41 minutes

Original release
- Network: Hulu
- Release: October 1, 2022

Huluween Dragstravaganza is a 2022 Halloween-themed variety special that premiered on October 1, 2022, exclusively through Hulu. The variety special stars Ginger Minj and Monét X Change, with drag legends, RuPaul's Drag Race and Dragula alums.

== Background ==
A teaser was released showing Ginger Minj and Monét X Change stuck in an old television. This variety show was the start of Hulu's yearly Huluween block. An original song for the show was free on Sept 16, 2022. On September 21, 2022, a trailer was released which confirmed that there would be five original songs. The variety show contains many skits with various references to many classic horror films. The show premiered on October 1, 2022. One of the actors, Jackie Beat, was one of the writers for the variety special. The special also has a special guest: Kesha, who performed her song "Cannibal".

== Plot ==
Ginger Minj and Monét X Change were getting ready for a show in West Hollywood until they stumbled onto an old television that appears to be haunted. When Monét hits the haunted television, the two were teleported to the "Land of Huluween".

== Cast ==
- Ginger Minj
- Monét X Change
- Lady Bunny
- Manila Luzon
- Mo Heart
- Jackie Beat
- Selene Luna
- Jujubee
- Landon Cider
- Justin Martindale
- Mario Diaz

== Soundtrack ==
Huluween Dragstravaganza (Original Soundtrack)

EP by various artists
- Released: October 30, 2022
- Length: 16:57
- Language: English
- Label: Hollywood

Singles from Huluween Dragstravaganza
- 1. "The Big Opening" Released: September 16, 2022

Huluween Dragstravaganza (First Soundtrack) is a soundtrack extended play that was released on September 30, 2022, through Hollywood Records. The soundtrack contains five original songs from the cast of the variety show. On September 16, 2022, Hulu released the first original song, called "The Big Opening".

=== Track listing ===
No.	Title	Writer(s)	Performer(s)	Length
1.	"The Big Opening"	Noah Davis; Chantry Johnson; Michelle Zarlenga	The Cast of Huluween Dragstravaganza	3:13
2.	"Dating a Vampire Sucks"	Dominyque Allen; Nick Pingree; Davis; Noémie Legrand	Jackie Beat; Selene Luna	3:41
3.	"The Next American language Slasher"	Austin Zudeck; Justin Thunstrom; Sofia Quinn; Stewart Taylor	Jujubee; Manila Luzon; Mo Heart	3:06
4.	"Who's Your Mummy?"	Legrand; Simon Oscroft; Quinn; Tony Ferrari	Jackie Beat; Lady Bunny	3:35
5.	"It's the End, Girlfriend"	Fallon King; Lucky West; Davis; Ferrari	The Cast of Huluween Dragstravaganza	3:22
Total length:				16:57
