= RuPaul's Drag Race All Stars season 4 =

2018–2019 season of RuPaul's Drag Race All Stars

RuPaul's Drag Race All Stars
- Season 4
- Promotional poster for season four
- Hosted by: RuPaul
- Judges: RuPaul Charles; Michelle Visage; Carson Kressley; Ross Mathews
- No. of contestants: 10
- Winners: Monét X Change; Trinity the Tuck
- No. of episodes: 10

Release
- Original network: VH1
- Original release: December 14, 2018 – February 15, 2019

Season chronology
- ← Previous; Season 3 Next → Season 5

The fourth season of RuPaul's Drag Race All Stars was announced by VH1 on August 22, 2018. Prior to the official announcement, RuPaul confirmed, in an episode of his podcast What's the Tee?, that filming for the fourth season of All Stars currently was underway. All Stars Season 3 winner Trixie Mattel, with special guests Katya and Detox, hosted a special called Trixie's Playhouse to announce the cast for the fourth season. It was scheduled to air on November 8, 2018, but was postponed to the following day due to the Thousand Oaks shooting. The season began airing on December 14, 2018, and ran for ten episodes.

The prizes for the winner of the competition are a one-year supply of Anastasia Beverly Hills Cosmetics and a cash prize of $100,000.

The winners of RuPaul's Drag Race All Stars season four were Monét X Change and Trinity the Tuck, with this season being the first and, so far, only one in Drag Race history to have two winners.

== Contestants ==
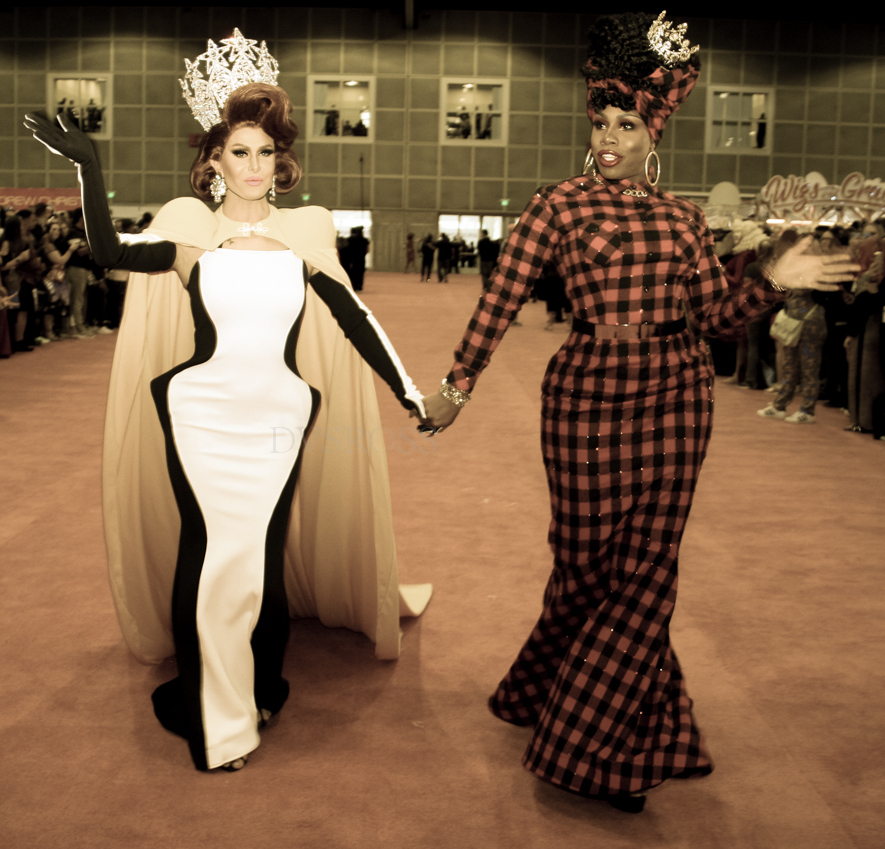
The winners, Trinity the Tuck (left) and Monét X Change (right).

Ages, names, and cities stated are at time of filming.

Contestants of RuPaul's Drag Race All Stars season 4 and their backgrounds
Contestant	Age	Hometown	Original season(s)	Original placement(s)	Outcome
Monét X Change	28	New York City, New York	Season 10	6th place (Note: The contestant was voted Miss Congeniality on her original season.)	Winners
Trinity the Tuck (Note: Trinity the Tuck was referred to as Trinity Taylor on Season 9.)	33	Orlando, Florida	Season 9	3rd place	Winners
Monique Heart (Note: Mo Heart is referred to as Monique Heart on the show.)	32	Kansas City, Missouri	Season 10	8th place	3rd place
Naomi Smalls	24	Redlands, California	Season 8	Runner-up	3rd place
Latrice Royale	46	Miami Beach, Florida	Season 4	4th place	5th place (Note: Latrice Royale placed seventh before re-entering the competition.)
Latrice Royale	46	Miami Beach, Florida	All Stars 1	7th place	5th place
Manila Luzon	36	Los Angeles, California	Season 3	Runner-up	6th place
Manila Luzon	36	Los Angeles, California	All Stars 1	7th place	6th place
Valentina	27	Los Angeles, California	Season 9	7th place	7th place
Gia Gunn	28	Los Angeles, California	Season 6	10th place	8th place
Farrah Moan	24	Los Angeles, California	Season 9	8th place	9th place
Jasmine Masters	41	Los Angeles, California	Season 7	12th place	10th place

== Contestant progress ==
Legend:

Monét X Change and Trinity the Tuck won RuPaul's Drag Race All Stars season 4.
WIN indicates that the contestant won the challenge and the Lip Sync for Your Legacy.
IN indicates that the eliminated contestant won the LaLaPaRuza lip sync and re-entered the competition.
TOP2 indicates that the contestant won the challenge, but lost the Lip Sync for Your Legacy.
STAY indicates that the contestant won the LaLaPaRuza lip sync and remained in the competition.
SAFE indicates that the contestant was declared safe by the judges.
IMM (Immunity) indicates that, having won the previous week's challenge, the contestant was immune from elimination.
BTM (Bottom) indicates that the contestant was up for elimination.
ELIM (Eliminated) indicates that the contestant was eliminated.
LOSS indicates that the contestant lost the LaLaPaRuza lip sync and did not return to the competition.

Progress of contestants including placements in each episode
Contestant	Episode									
Contestant	1	2	3	4	5 (Note: After the fifth episode's lip sync, RuPaul declared that All Stars rules would be temporarily suspended and nobody would be going home.)	6	7	8	9	10
Monét X Change	SAFE	TOP2	SAFE	BTM	WIN	IMM	SAFE	TOP2	BTM	Winner
Trinity the Tuck	WIN	SAFE	TOP2	SAFE	BTM	STAY	TOP2	SAFE	WIN	Winner
Monique Heart	TOP2	BTM	SAFE	WIN	BTM	STAY	SAFE	SAFE	TOP2	Eliminated
Naomi Smalls	SAFE	SAFE	SAFE	SAFE	BTM	STAY	BTM	WIN	BTM	Eliminated
Latrice Royale	SAFE	SAFE	SAFE	ELIM		IN	WIN	BTM	ELIM	
Manila Luzon	SAFE	SAFE	WIN	TOP2	WIN	IMM	SAFE	ELIM		
Valentina	SAFE	WIN	BTM	SAFE	BTM	STAY	ELIM			
Gia Gunn	SAFE	SAFE	ELIM			LOSS				
Farrah Moan	BTM	ELIM				LOSS				
Jasmine Masters	ELIM					LOSS				

== Lip syncs ==
Legend:

The contestant was eliminated after their first time in the bottom.
The contestant was eliminated after their second time in the bottom.
The contestant was eliminated after their third time in the bottom.
The contestant won their LaLaPaRuZa lip sync and stayed in the competition.
The contestant won their LaLaPaRuZa lip sync and re-entered the competition.
The contestants won the Lip Sync for the Crown and were declared the winners of the season.

Episode	Top All Stars (Elimination)			Song	Winner(s)	Bottom	Eliminated
1	Monique Heart (Jasmine)	vs.	Trinity the Tuck (Jasmine)	"Emotions" (Mariah Carey)	Trinity the Tuck	Farrah, Jasmine	Jasmine Masters
2	Monét X Change (Farrah)	vs.	Valentina (Farrah)	"Into You" (Ariana Grande)	Valentina	Farrah, Monique	Farrah Moan
3	Manila Luzon (Gia)	vs.	Trinity the Tuck (Gia)	"How Will I Know" (Whitney Houston)	Manila Luzon	Gia, Valentina	Gia Gunn
4	Manila Luzon (Monét)	vs.	Monique Heart (Latrice)	"The Bitch Is Back" (Tina Turner)	Monique Heart	Latrice, Monét	Latrice Royale
5	Manila Luzon (Valentina)	vs.	Monét X Change (Valentina)	"Jump to It" (Aretha Franklin)	Manila Luzon	Monique, Naomi, Trinity, Valentina	None (Note: In episode 5, RuPaul declared after the lip sync that All Stars rules would be temporarily suspended and nobody would be going home.)
5	Manila Luzon (Valentina)	vs.	Monét X Change (Valentina)	"Jump to It" (Aretha Franklin)	Monét X Change	Monique, Naomi, Trinity, Valentina	None
Episode	Contestants			Song	Winner(s)		
6	Jasmine Masters	vs.	Trinity the Tuck	"Peanut Butter" (RuPaul ft. Big Freedia)	Trinity the Tuck		
6	Farrah Moan	vs.	Valentina	"Kitty Girl" (RuPaul)	Valentina		
6	Gia Gunn	vs.	Naomi Smalls	"Adrenaline" (RuPaul ft. Myah Marie)	Naomi Smalls		
6	Latrice Royale	vs.	Monique Heart	"Sissy That Walk" (RuPaul)	Latrice Royale		
6	Latrice Royale	vs.	Monique Heart	"Sissy That Walk" (RuPaul)	Monique Heart		
Episode	Top All Stars (Elimination)			Song	Winner	Bottom	Eliminated
7	Latrice Royale (Valentina)	vs.	Trinity the Tuck (Valentina)	"You Spin Me Round (Like a Record)" (Dead or Alive)	Latrice Royale	Naomi, Valentina	Valentina
8	Monét X Change (Manila)	vs.	Naomi Smalls (Manila)	"Come Rain or Come Shine" (Judy Garland)	Naomi Smalls	Latrice, Manila	Manila Luzon
9	Monique Heart (Latrice)	vs.	Trinity the Tuck (Latrice)	"When I Think of You" (Janet Jackson)	Trinity the Tuck	Latrice, Monét, Naomi	Latrice Royale
Episode	Final All Stars			Song	Winners		
10	Monét X Change	vs.	Trinity the Tuck	"Fighter" (Christina Aguilera)	Monét X Change		
10	Monét X Change	vs.	Trinity the Tuck	"Fighter" (Christina Aguilera)	Trinity the Tuck		

== Guest judges ==
Guest judges for this season include:

- Jenifer Lewis, actress, comedian, singer, and activist
- Ciara, singer-songwriter, dancer, and model
- Kacey Musgraves, singer-songwriter
- Gus Kenworthy, freestyler skier and actor
- Keiynan Lonsdale, actor, singer-songwriter, and dancer
- Erica Ash, actress, comedian, singer, and model
- Zoë Kravitz, actress, singer, and model
- Cecily Strong, actress and comedian
- Yvette Nicole Brown, actress, voice actress, and comedian
- Rita Ora, singer-songwriter and actress
- Susanne Bartsch, event producer
- Ellen Pompeo, actress, director, and producer
- Frances Bean Cobain, visual artist and model
- Felicity Huffman, actress
- Jason Wu, artist and fashion designer
- Todrick Hall, actor and singer

=== Special guests ===
Guests who appeared in episodes but did not judge on the main stage (in order of appearance):

Episode 2

- Stacy Layne Matthews, contestant from season 3
- Leland, singer-songwriter, composer, and record producer
- Freddy Scott, composer and actor

Episode 4

- Stacy Layne Matthews
- Elton John, singer-songwriter and composer

Episode 5

- Lady Bunny, drag queen
- Stacy Layne Matthews

Episode 10

- Chad Michaels, runner up of season four and winner of the first season of All Stars
- Alaska, runner up of season five and winner of the second season of All Stars
- Trixie Mattel, contestant on season seven and winner of the third season of All Stars

== Episodes ==
No. overall	No. in season	Title	Original release date
24	1	"All Star Super Queen Variety Show"	December 14, 2018
Ten all-stars enter the workroom. For the first mini-challenge, the queens will read each other to filth. Latrice Royale wins the mini-challenge. For the main challenge, the queens will perform a talent show in front of the judges and a live audience.: Farrah Moan - Burlesque; Gia Gunn - Kabuki; Jasmine Masters - Stand-up comedy routine; Manila Luzon - Upside down painting; Monét X Change - Live singing and lip-syncing; Monique Heart - Live singing; Naomi Smalls - Lip-syncing; Latrice Royale - Color Guard routine; Trinity the Tuck - Tucking; Valentina - Lip-syncing; On the runway, Monique Heart, Naomi Smalls and Trinity The Tuck receive positive critiques, with Monique Heart and Trinity The Tuck being announced as the top two. Farrah Moan, Jasmine Masters and Monét X Change receive negative critiques, with Farrah Moan and Jasmine Masters being announced as the bottom two. Monique Heart and Trinity The Tuck lip-sync to "Emotions" by Mariah Carey. Trinity The Tuck wins the lip-sync and decides to eliminate Jasmine Masters from the competition.: Guest Judge: Jenifer Lewis; Mini-Challenge: Reading is Fundamental; Mini-Challenge Winner: Latrice Royale; Mini-Challenge Prize: A $2,000 gift card to l.a.Eyeworks; Main Challenge: Perform a talent show in front of the judges and a live audience; Top Two: Monique Heart and Trinity The Tuck; Challenge Prize: A 7 Night Stay for Two at the Sand Castle on the Beach Hotel in St. Croix, U.S. Virgin Islands; Lip-Sync Song: "Emotions" by Mariah Carey; Lip-Sync for Your Legacy Winner: Trinity The Tuck; Bottom Two: Farrah Moan and Jasmine Masters; Eliminated: Jasmine Masters; Farewell Message:"Hey Jush much to you all. Kick face luv Jasmine Masters"
25	2	"Super Girl Groups, Henny"	December 21, 2018
At the beginning of the episode, Monique Heart reveals that she would have sent home Jasmine Masters from the competition, had she won the lip-sync. For this week's main challenge, the queens will write, record, and perform their own verses to two different songs.: Team Don't Funk it Up - Gia Gunn, Latrice Royale, Manila Luzon, Trinity The Tuck and Valentina; Team Errybody Say Love - Farrah Moan, Monét X Change, Monique Heart and Naomi Smalls; On the runway, category is Eleguence After Dark. Monét X Change, Naomi Smalls and Valentina receive positive critiques, with Monét X Change and Valentina being announced as the top two. Farrah Moan, Manila Luzon and Monique Heart receive negative critiques, with Farrah Moan and Monique Heart being announced as the bottom two. Monét X Change and Valentina lip-sync to "Into You" by Ariana Grande. Valentina wins the lip-sync and decides to eliminate Farrah Moan from the competition.: Guest Judges: Kacey Musgraves and Ciara; Main Challenge: Write, record, and perform their own verses to two different songs; Runway Theme: Eleguence After Dark; Top Two: Monét X Change and Valentina; Challenge Prize: $2,500 gift card from Arda Wigs and a $1,000 gift card from CoolHaus Ice Cream; Lip-Sync Song: "Into You" by Ariana Grande; Lip-Sync for Your Legacy Winner: Valentina; Bottom Two: Farrah Moan and Monique Heart; Eliminated: Farrah Moan; Farewell Message:"Shine bright All Stars xoxo Farrah Moan"
26	3	"Snatch Game of Love"	December 28, 2018
At the beginning of the episode, Monét X Change reveals that she would have sent home Farrah Moan from the competition, had she won the lip-sync. For this week's main challenge, the queens will play the Snatch Game of love. Gus Kenworthy and Keiynan Lonsdale star as the celebrity contestants. The cast consisted of: Vying for Gus Kenworthy's love are: Monét X Change as Whitney Houston; Naomi Smalls as Wendy Williams; Trinity The Tuck as Caitlyn Jenner; Valentina as Eartha Kitt; Vying for Keiynan Lonsdale's love are: Gia Gunn as Jenny Bui; Latrice Royale as Della Reese; Manila Luzon as Barbra Streisand; Monique Heart as Tiffany Haddish; On the runway, category is Boots the House Down. Manila Luzon, Naomi Smalls and Trinity The Tuck receive positive critiques, with Manila Luzon and Trinity The Tuck being announced as the top two. Gia Gunn, Latrice Royale and Valentina receive negative critiques, with Gia Gunn and Valentina being announced as the bottom two. Manila Luzon and Trinity The Tuck lip-sync to "How Will I Know" by Whitney Houston. Manila Luzon wins the lip-sync and decides to eliminate Gia Gunn from the competition.: Guest Judges: Gus Kenworthy and Keiynan Lonsdale; Main Challenge: Snatch Game of Love; Runway Theme: Boots the House Down; Top Two: Manila Luzon and Trinity The Tuck; Challenge Prize: A set of suitcases from Away plus airfare and a 5 night stay at The Grand Resort and Spa in Fort Lauderdale; Lip-Sync Song: "How Will I Know" by Whitney Houston; Lip-Sync for Your Legacy Winner: Manila Luzon; Bottom Two: Gia Gunn and Valentina; Eliminated: Gia Gunn; Farewell Message:"Believe In You, And Only You! xoxo, Gia"
27	4	"Jersey Justice"	January 4, 2019
At the beginning of the episode, Trinity The Tuck reveals that she would have sent home Gia Gunn from the competition, had she won the lip-sync. For this week's main challenge, the queens will improvise in the courtroom show "Jersey Justice".: You Made Me Look Like a Bitch, Bitch! - Manila Luzon and Naomi Smalls; How 'Bout Them Cakes? - Monét X Change, Monique Heart and Latrice Royale; I Was Snookered by Snooki! - Trinity The Tuck and Valentina; On the runway, category is Swerves and Curves: Padded for the Gods. Manila Luzon, Monique Heart, Naomi Smalls and Valentina receive positive critiques, with Manila Luzon and Monique Heart being announced as the top two. Latrice Royale, Monét X Change and Trinity The Tuck receive negative critiques, with Latrice Royale and Monét X Change being announced as the bottom two. Manila Luzon and Monique Heart lip-sync to "The Bitch Is Back" by Tina Turner. Monique Heart wins the lip-sync and decides to eliminate Latrice Royale from the competition.: Guest Judges: Zoe Kravitz and Erica Ash; Main Challenge: Improvise in the courtroom show "Jersey Justice"; Runway Theme: Swerves and Curves: Padded for the Gods; Top Two: Manila Luzon and Monique Heart; Challenge Prize: A $2,500 gift card from FierceQueen.com and $2,000 gift card from Elea's Closet; Lip-Sync Song: "The Bitch Is Back" by Tina Turner; Lip-Sync for Your Legacy Winner: Monique Heart; Bottom Two: Latrice Royale and Monét X Change; Eliminated: Latrice Royale; Farewell Message: "It aint over til the fat lady sings. I love you ALL!!! Stay FIERCE and above all love each other! ♡Latrice Royale"
28	5	"Roast in Peace"	January 11, 2019
At the beginning of the episode, Manila Luzon reveals that she would have sent home Monét X Change from the competition, had she won the lip-sync. For the main challenge, the queens will perform a roast of Lady Bunny, the judges, and the fellow queens in front of a live audience. On the runway, category is Angelic White. Manila Luzon and Monét X Change receive positive critiques, and are announced as the top two. Monique Heart, Naomi Smalls, Trinity The Tuck and Valentina receive negative critiques, and are announced as the bottom four. Manila Luzon and Monét X Change lip-sync to "Jump to It" by Aretha Franklin. Manila Luzon and Monét X Change win the lip-sync. RuPaul then announces that all-star rules have been suspended temporarily, and that no one will be going home.: Guest Judges: Cecily Strong and Yvette Nicole Brown; Main Challenge: Perform a roast of Lady Bunny, the judges, and the fellow queens in front of a live audience; Runway Theme: Angelic White; Top Two: Manila Luzon and Monét X Change; Challenge Prize: $3,000 gift card from MuLondon and a wig wardrobe from RockStar Wigs; Lip-Sync Song: "Jump to It" by Aretha Franklin; Lip-Sync for Your Legacy Winners: Manila Luzon and Monét X Change; Bottom Four: Monique Heart, Naomi Smalls, Trinity The Tuck and Valentina; Eliminated: None
29	6	"LaLaPaRUza"	January 18, 2019
At the beginning of the episode the previously eliminated queens all return to the workroom. Manila Luzon and Monét X Change reveal that they both would have sent home Valentina from the competition. For this week's main challenge, the queens will perform in a lip-sync LaLaPaRUza smackdown. The previously eliminated queens, will choose one of the currently competing queens, in the order that they were eliminated in, to lip-sync against. The winner of the lip-sync will remain in the competition. The loser of the lip-sync will be eliminated. Manila Luzon and Monét X Change, who won last week's challenge, were given immunity from this challenge. On the runway, category is LaLaPaRUza Eleganza. The first lip-sync is between Jasmine Masters and Trinity The Tuck. They lip-sync to "Peanut Butter" by RuPaul ft. Big Freedia. Trinity The Tuck wins the lip-sync and Jasmine Masters sashays away. The second lip-sync is between Farrah Moan and Valentina. They lip-sync to "Kitty Girl" by RuPaul. Valentina wins the lip-sync and Farrah Moan sashays away. The third lip-sync is between Gia Gunn and Naomi Smalls. They lip-sync to "Adrenaline" by RuPaul ft. Myah Marie. Naomi Smalls wins the lip-sync and Gia Gunn sashays away. The final lip-sync is between Latrice Royale and Monique Heart. They lip-sync to "Sissy That Walk" by RuPaul. Latrice Royale and Monique Heart both win the lip-sync, and Latrice Royale officially returns to the competition.: Main Challenge: Perform in a lip-sync LaLaPaRUza smackdown; Runway Theme: LaLaPaRUza Eleganza; Lip-Sync Songs: "Peanut Butter" by RuPaul ft. Big Freedia, "Kitty Girl" by RuPaul, "Adrenaline" by RuPaul ft. Myah Marie, and "Sissy That Walk" by RuPaul; Lip-Sync for Your Life Winners: Trinity The Tuck, Valentina, Naomi Smalls, Monique Heart and Latrice Royale; Returned: Latrice Royale
30	7	"Queens of Clubs"	January 25, 2019
For this week's main challenge, the queens will team up to create and host their own night club.: Club 96 - Naomi Smalls and Valentina; Club Hive - Latrice Royale, Manila Luzon and Trinity The Tuck; The Blackhole - Monét X Change and Monique Heart; On the runway, category is Plastique Fantastique. Latrice Royale, Manila Luzon, Monét X Change and Trinity The Tuck receive positive critiques, with Latrice Royale and Trinity The Tuck being announced as the top two. Naomi Smalls and Valentina receive negative critiques, and are announced as the bottom two. Latrice Royale and Trinity The Tuck lip-sync to "You Spin Me Round (Like a Record)" by Dead or Alive. Latrice Royale wins the lip-sync and decides to eliminate Valentina from the competition.: Guest Judges: Rita Ora and Susanne Bartsch; Main Challenge: In teams, create and host your own night club; Runway Theme: Plastique Fantastique; Top Two: Latrice Royale and Trinity The Tuck; Challenge Prize: A $2,500 gift card to The Crème Shop and a $3,000 gift card to J.J. MALIBU; Lip-Sync Song: "You Spin Me Round (Like a Record)" by Dead or Alive; Lip-Sync for Your Legacy Winner: Latrice Royale; Bottom Two: Naomi Smalls and Valentina; Eliminated: Valentina; Farewell Message: "UGH! I HAVE TO PACK! Love you all! Valentina"
31	8	"RuPaul's Best Judy's Race"	February 1, 2019
At the beginning of the episode, Trinity The Tuck reveals that she would have sent home Valentina from the competition, had she won the lip-sync. For this week's main challenge, the queens will makeover their best Judy's. On the runway, category is Best Judy's. Monét X Change, Monique Heart, Naomi Smalls and Trinity The Tuck receive positive critiques, with Monét X Change and Naomi Smalls being announced as the top two. Latrice Royale and Manila Luzon receive negative critiques, and are announced as the bottom two. Monét X Change and Naomi Smalls lip-sync to "Come Rain or Come Shine" by Judy Garland. Naomi Smalls wins the lip-sync and decides to eliminate Manila Luzon from the competition.: Guest Judges: Frances Bean Cobain and Ellen Pompeo; Main Challenge: Makeover your best Judy's; Runway Theme: Best Judy's; Top Two: Monét X Change and Naomi Smalls; Challenge Prize: A trip for two to Iceland with complimentary first class airfare from WOW air and a four night stay at Design Hotel from Pink Iceland for the queens, and a $1,000 gift card from Klein Epstein & Parker for the Judy's.; Lip-Sync Song: "Come Rain or Come Shine" by Judy Garland; Lip-Sync for Your Legacy Winner: Naomi Smalls; Bottom Two: Latrice Royale and Manila Luzon; Eliminated: Manila Luzon; Farewell Message: "DRIVER! Kill it! See you out there! Manila"
32	9	"Sex and the Kitty Girl"	February 8, 2019
At the beginning of the episode, Monét X Change reveals that she would have sent home Manila Luzon from the competition, had she won the lip-sync. For this week's main challenge, the queens will star in a mockumentary of "Sex and the City" called "Sex and the Kitty, Girl 3".: Latrice Royale plays Cynthia; Monét X Change plays Kristin; Monique Heart plays K-Jo; Naomi Smalls plays SJP; Trinity The Tuck plays Kim; On the runway, category is Cat Couture. Monique Heart and Trinity The Tuck receive positive critiques, and are announced as the top two. Latrice Royale, Monét X Change and Naomi Smalls receive negative critiques, and are announced as the bottom three. Monique Heart and Trinity The Tuck lip-sync to "When I Think of You" by Janet Jackson. Trinity The Tuck wins the lip-sync and decides to eliminate Latrice Royale from the competition.: Guest Judges: Jason Wu and Felicity Huffman; Main Challenge: Star in a mockumentary of "Sex and the City" called "Sex and the Kitty, Girl 3"; Runway Theme: Cat Couture; Top Two: Monique Heart and Trinity The Tuck; Challenge Prize: A $3,000 gift card from The Diva's Jewels and a three night stay for two at The Standard East Village in New York; Lip-Sync Song: "When I Think of You" by Janet Jackson; Lip-Sync for Your Legacy Winner: Trinity The Tuck; Bottom Three: Latrice Royale, Monét X Change, and Naomi Smalls; Eliminated: Latrice Royale; Farewell Message: "STILL A Queen! BYE! CYA! Latrice"
33	10	"Super Queen Grand Finale"	February 15, 2019
At the beginning of the episode, Monique Heart reveals that she would have sent home Latrice Royale from the competition, had she won the lip-sync. For the final challenge of the season, the queens will write, record, and perform their own verses to RuPaul's song "Super Queen". On the runway, category is All Star Eleganza. Monique Heart and Naomi Smalls are eliminated, leaving Monét X Change and Trinity The Tuck as the top two queens of the season. They lip-sync to "Fighter" by Christina Aguilera. It is revealed that Monét X Change and Trinity The Tuck are both the winners.: Guest Judges: Todrick Hall; Main Challenge: Write, record, and perform their own verses to RuPaul's song "Super Queen"; Runway Theme: All Star Eleganza; Eliminated: Monique Heart and Naomi Smalls; Final Two: Monét X Change and Trinity The Tuck; Lip Sync Song: "Fighter" by Christina Aguilera; Winners of RuPaul's Drag Race All Stars Season Four: Monét X Change and Trinity The Tuck

== Ratings ==
Viewership and ratings per episode of RuPaul's Drag Race All Stars season 4
No.	Title	Air date	Rating (18–49)	Viewers (millions)
1	"All Star Super Queen Variety Show"	December 14, 2018	0.23	0.513
2	"Super Girl Groups, Henny"	December 21, 2018	0.23	0.510
3	"Snatch Game of Love"	December 28, 2018	0.25	0.632
4	"Jersey Justice"	January 4, 2019	0.24	0.488
5	"Roast in Peace"	January 11, 2019	0.23	0.512
6	"LaLaPaRUza"	January 18, 2019	0.25	0.566
7	"Queens of Clubs"	January 25, 2019	0.29	0.647
8	"RuPaul's Best Judy's Race"	February 1, 2019	0.25	0.542
9	"Sex and the Kitty Girl"	February 8, 2019	0.27	0.549
10	"Super Queen Grand Finale"	February 15, 2019	0.27	0.598

== See also ==
- Queen of Queens, 2019 remix album featuring "Super Queen"
