= Justin Martindale =

American stand-up comedian

- Born: San Antonio, Texas, United States

Comedy career
- Medium: Stand-up comedy, podcasting, television, film
- Genres: Observational comedy; satire
- Subjects: LGBTQ culture; everyday life; human sexuality; popular culture

Justin Martindale is an American stand-up comedian. Born in San Antonio, Texas, he is based in Los Angeles since 2008.

Martindale was a writer for the E! network Joan Rivers television series Fashion Police and a judge on E!'s The Funny Dance Show, as well as a performer on MTV's Acting Out.

In 2022, Martindale was a co-writer and performer on the Halloween-themed variety special Huluween Dragstravaganza that premiered on Hulu.
