= Mo Heart =

American drag performer and singer (born 1986)

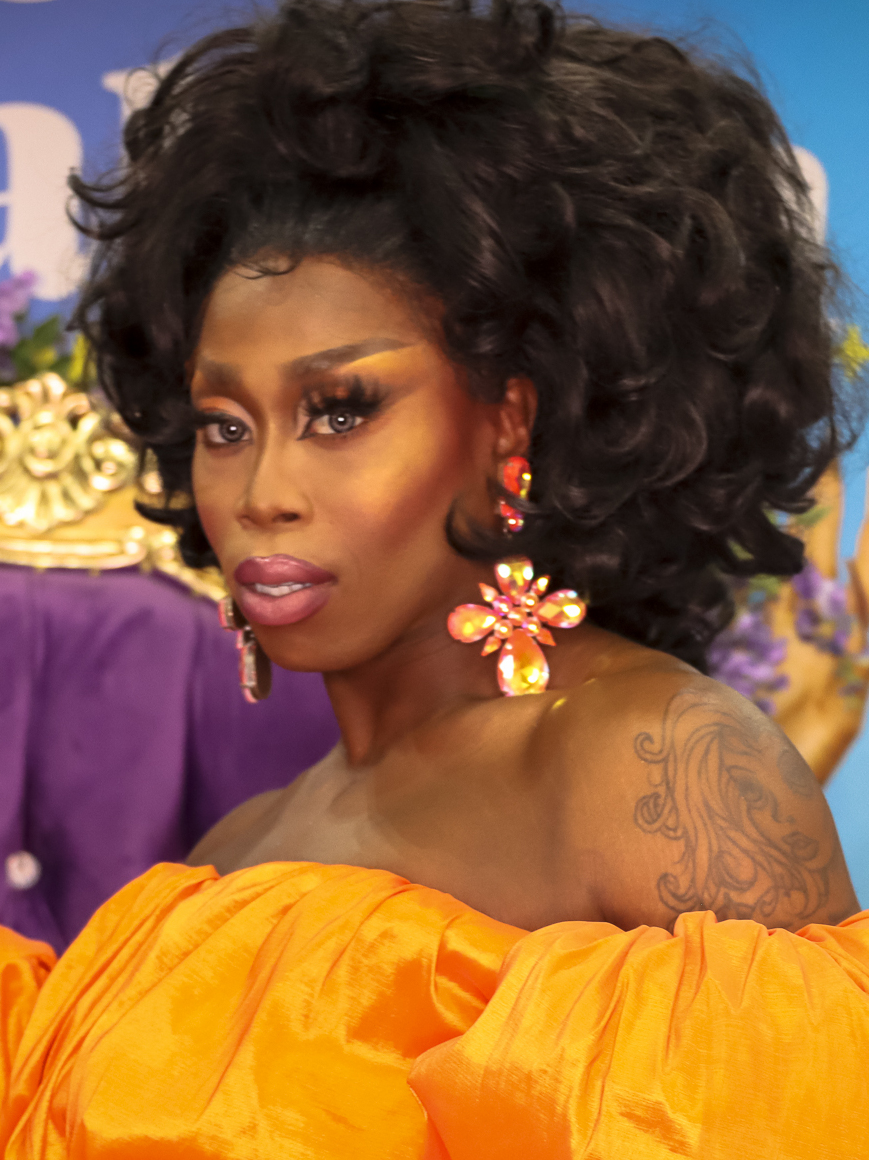
- Mo Heart in 2022
- Born: Kevin Leandrew Richardson; May 22, 1986 (age 40); Long Island, New York, U.S.
- Other name: Monique Heart
- Education: International House of Prayer University
- Years active: 2011–present
- Known for: RuPaul's Drag Race (season 10); RuPaul's Drag Race All Stars (season 4); RuPaul's Drag Race: UK vs. the World (series 1)

Mo Heart, formerly Monique Heart, is the stage name of Kevin Leandrew Richardson (born May 22, 1986), an American drag queen, reality television personality, and recording artist best known for competing on the tenth season of RuPaul's Drag Race (2018), the fourth season of RuPaul's Drag Race: All Stars (2018–2019), and the first series of RuPaul's Drag Race: UK vs. the World (2022). Since first appearing on Drag Race in 2018, Mo Heart has appeared in a number of web series produced by World of Wonder, including a starring role in Manic Moments With Monique Heart, and hosted her own podcast, Ace of Hearts with Monique Heart. In January 2019, she released her debut single "Brown Cow Stunning", and later released her debut extended play Beloved SoS 6.3 in 2020.

== Early life ==
Richardson was born on May 22, 1986, on Long Island, New York. He spent time in areas in Long Island which includes Roosevelt, New York and Freeport, New York. He also stayed in Bedford-Stuyvesant with his father when he was growing up. Richardson was often teased at school for being different. He moved to Virginia in 2000 before moving to Kansas City, Missouri after graduating from high school and studied the Bible at the International House of Prayer University in Grandview, where he experienced conversion therapy.

== Career ==
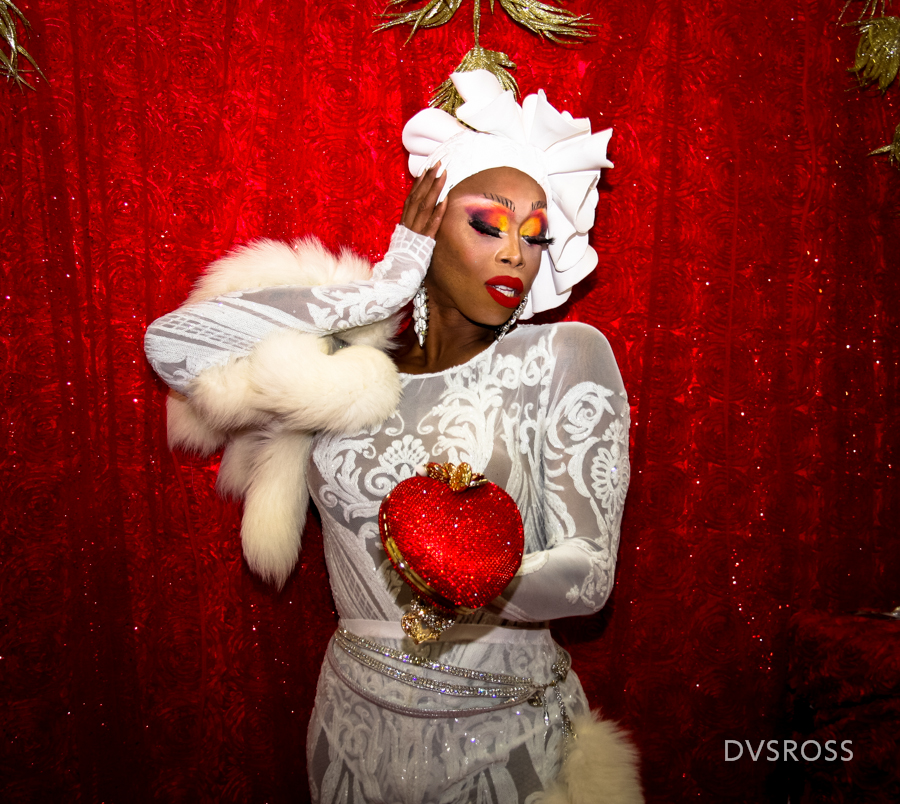
Mo Heart in 2018

Richardson's original drag name was Monique Kutabetch Heart and later changed to Monique Heart. Some other rejected drag names were Ariana Styles, Nevah, Jiz Zonra, and Kisha Amillion. He created "Monique Heart" in 2011, and began a career as a drag queen at Hamburger Mary's, emceeing bingo and hosting Sunday drag brunch.

Mo Heart first auditioned for the eighth season of RuPaul's Drag Race but was unsuccessful. Two years later, she would audition for the tenth season of RuPaul's Drag Race and this time succeeded in qualifying to be a contestant. Before being accepted on the season, Mo Heart was ready to quit drag, but decided to continue. She placed eighth overall, after losing a lip sync to "Cut to the Feeling" by Carly Rae Jepsen against The Vixen. Mo Heart was confirmed to be one of the contestants competing in the fourth season of RuPaul's Drag Race: All Stars on November 9, 2018. After not winning any challenges in her original season, Mo Heart won three main challenges during All Stars, eventually reaching Top 4. She was a runner-up alongside Naomi Smalls, finishing in joint 3rd/4th place to Monét X Change and Trinity the Tuck. Mo Heart's catchphrases on the show were quoted by Rihanna, Alexandria Ocasio-Cortez, and Lizzo.

Mo Heart was announced as part of the cast for the first season of RuPaul's Secret Celebrity Drag Race, a Drag Race spin-off where Drag Race alumni transform celebrities into drag queens. On March 5 and 6, Mo Heart performed alongside fellow drag race alumni Bebe Zahara Benet, Bob the Drag Queen, The Vixen, Peppermint, and Shea Couleé in the Nubia Tour, a live drag show featuring and produced by Black drag queens. In August, Mo Heart will start in her very own World of Wonder Presents web series called Manic Moments with Monique Heart.

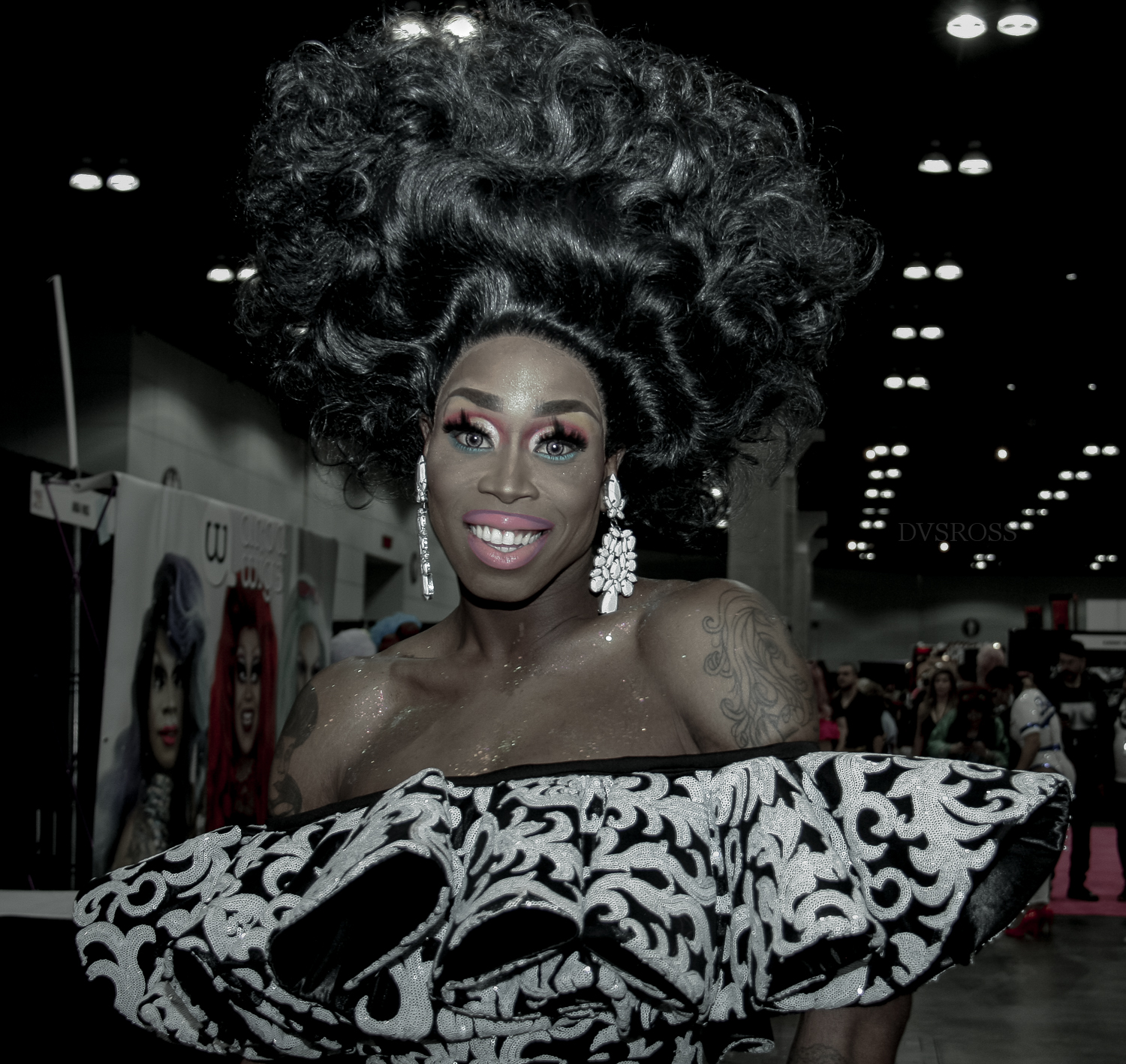
Mo Heart in 2019

In June 2021, Mo Heart was a featured performer for the second annual It Gets Better: A Digital Pride Experience. She hosted her own podcast, Ace of Hearts with Monique Heart.

Mo Heart hosted the Amazon Music original fashion-themed TV series, The Walk In, where she interviewed celebrities as they show off some of their iconic fashion moments throughout their careers. Featured guests included Lil Nas X, Rico Nasty, and Jax. Mo Heart owns her own beauty company, MoBeauty.

In January 2022, Mo Heart was announced as one of the nine contestants on the first series of RuPaul's Drag Race: UK vs. the World, now going by her new name. Regarding the name change, she said:

The reason I changed my name [is] because I’m growing as an artist [...] I believe that artists should always evolve and grow and I just felt like, I as an individual just want to give more heart, more love, more everything and just for branding, it just makes sense to be just 'Mo'.

In the penultimate episode, Mo Heart placed in the Top 2, and lip-synced to "Toy" by Netta, but lost to Jujubee. Mo Heart went onto compete in the Top 4 finale, and placed second to Blu Hydrangea.

=== Music ===
Mo Heart performed her debut single "Brown Cow Stunning" on the premiere episode of RuPaul's Drag Race: All-Stars, and was released on January 4, 2019. A music video for the song was released the same day. Mo Heart appeared in the music video for "Soak It Up" by fellow Season 10 contestant Monét X Change and season 8 winner Bob the Drag Queen. On September 4, Mo Heart released another single, "SUKM (Kiss Me)", as well as an accompanying lyric video, the debut single for her EP, Beloved SoS 6.3, which was released in 2020.

== Personal life ==
Richardson first realized he was gay at the age of 17 while working a shift at Burger King. He is a Christian. In 2019, he moved to Los Angeles, and as of 2021, currently resides in Palm Springs.

== Discography ==
=== EPs ===
Title	Details
Beloved SoS 6.3 (with KOIL)	Released: January 24, 2020; Label: Self-released; Formats: digital download
Redemption	Released: June 25, 2022; Label: Self-released; Formats: digital download

=== Singles ===
==== As lead artist ====
Title	Year	Album
"Brown Cow Stunning"	2018	non-album single
"SUKM (Kiss Me)"	2019	Beloved SoS 6.3
"Hot Sauce & High Heels" (Kinky Boots Remix) (with KOIL)	2020	Non-album single
"Redemption"	2022	Redemption
"God's Been Good to Me"	2022	Redemption
"Come See About Me"	2022	Redemption

==== Featured singles ====
Title	Year	Album
"Errybody Say Love" (RuPaul featuring Naomi Smalls, Monique Heart, Farrah Moan, and Monét X Change)	2018	non-album single
"Super Queen" (RuPaul featuring Naomi Smalls, Monét X Change, Monique Heart, & Trinity the Tuck)	2019	non-album single
"I'm a Drag Queen" (feat. Leland, Freddy Scott, Brooke Villyani, Alyssa Edwards, Vanessa Vanjie Mateo, and Monique Heart)	2020	non-album single
"Better by Myself" (JORDY and Monique Heart)	2020	non-album single
"Living My Life in London (Cast Version)" (RuPaul featuring the cast of RuPaul's Drag Race UK vs The World)	2022	non-album single
"The Big Opening" (Ginger Minj and Monét X Change featuring the cast of Huluween Dragstravaganza)	2022	non-album single

== Filmography ==
=== Film ===
Year	Title	Role	Notes	Ref(s)
2020	Nubia: Amplified	Herself	OutTV original	
2021	Being Bebe	Herself	Archive footage	

=== Television ===
Year	Title	Role	Notes	Ref
2018	RuPaul's Drag Race	Herself	Contestant (8th place); Season 10	
2018	RuPaul's Drag Race: Untucked	Herself	Contestant (8th place); Season 10	
2018–2019	RuPaul's Drag Race All Stars	Herself	Contestant (3rd/4th place); Season 4	
2019	KSHB-TV	Herself	Guest	
2020	AJ and the Queen	Miss Terri Tory	Guest appearance	
2020	Hey Qween!	Herself	Guest	
2020	RuPaul's Secret Celebrity Drag Race	Herself	Mentor	
2020	For Christmas Sake: The Movie Musical	Cupid	Musical short film	
2022	Nubia Amplified: The Series	Herself	Panelist	
2022	RuPaul's Drag Race: UK vs. the World	Herself	Contestant (Runner-Up); Series 1	
2022	iCarly	Auntie Histamine	Guest appearance	
2022	Trixie Motel	Herself	Guest appearance	
2022	Huluween Dragstravaganza	Herself	Hulu original	

=== Music videos ===
Year	Title	Artist	Ref
2018	"Soak It Up"	Monét X Change	
2019	"Brown Cow Stunning"	Herself	
2020	"Hot Sauce and High Heels (Kinky Boots Remix)"	Herself	
2020	"Keep That Same Energy"	Widow Von'Du ft. Shilow	
2020	"Sitting Alone in the VIP"	Alaska Thunderfuck featuring Kandy Muse	

=== Web series ===
Year	Title	Role	Notes	Ref
2017	Crazy X Girlfriend	Herself	Guest	
2018	Cosmo Queens	Herself	Guest	
2018	Queen to Queen	Herself	Alongside The Vixen	
2018	Countdown to the Crown	Herself	Season 10	
2019	Review With a Jew	Herself	Guest	
2019	Whatcha Packin'?	Herself	Season 10, All Stars 4	
2019	Radio Andy	Herself	Guest	
2019	Queen's Court	Herself	Guest	
2019	The Stan Game	Herself	Guest	
2019	Yvie's Odd School	Herself	Episode: "Quick Drag with Monique Heart"	
2019	Drag Queens React	Herself	Episode: "RuPaul's Drag Race UK"	
2019	Envy of My Boogie	Herself	Episode: "Dancing for Your Tips with Monique Heart"	
2020	Bobbin' Around	Herself	Episode: "Nubia"	
2020	Alyssa's Secret	Herself	Episode: "Manic Moments with Monique Heart"	
2020	Elevate Your Slay	Herself	Guest	
2020	Working Out Is a Drag	Herself	Guest	
2020	Transformations	Herself	Guest	
2020	Manic Moments with Monique Heart	Herself	Star	
2020	The X Change Rate	Herself	Episode: "Monique Heart"	
2021	The Pit Stop	Herself	Guest	
2021	Binge	Herself	Podcast by Entertainment Weekly	
2021–present	The Walk In	Herself	Host; produced by Amazon Music	
2022	Bring Back My Girls	Herself	Guest	
