= Susanne Bartsch =

Event producer

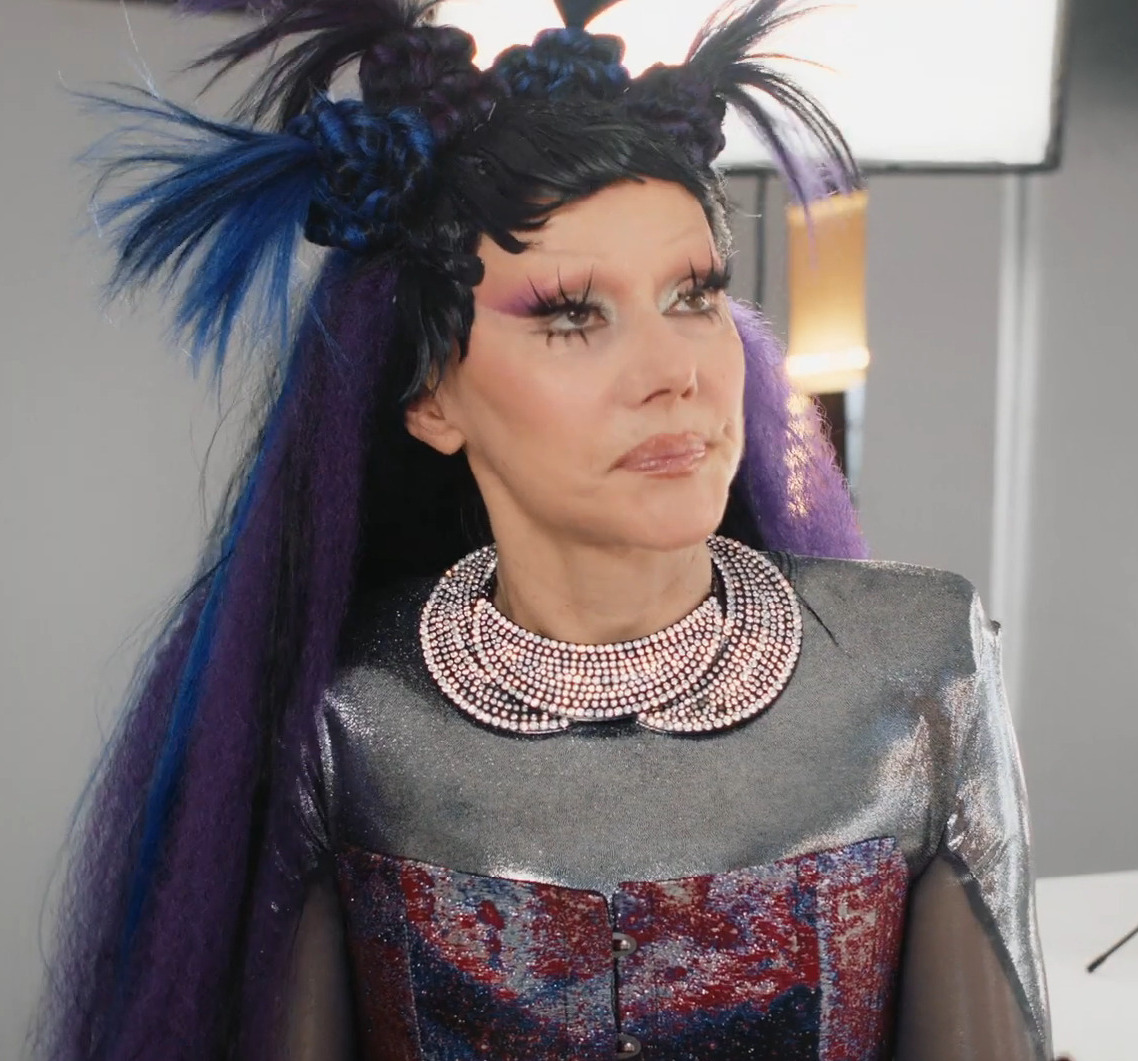
- Bartsch in 2023
- Born: Susanne Hedwig Bärtsch; September 19, 1951 (age 75); Bern, Switzerland
- Occupation: Event producer
- Spouse: David Barton (m. 1995; sep. 2010)
- Children: 1

Susanne Bartsch (née Susanne Hedwig Bärtsch; born 19 September 1951) is a Swiss event producer primarily active in New York City.

Her monthly parties at the Copacabana in late-1980s New York City united the haute and demi-monde and made her an icon of New York nightlife. "Ms. Bartsch's name is the night life equivalent of a couture label," according to The New York Times, "thanks to the numerous extravaganzas she staged in cities from Montreal to Miami."

== Life and career ==
Born in Bern, Switzerland, Susi, as she was called as a child, was the youngest of three children of Mina (born Enz) and Werner Alfred Bärtsch, a cabinetmaker. Bartsch left her family at 17 and moved to London, where she became an intimate of such celebrities as Jimmy Page and Malcolm McLaren. She moved to New York City for love in February 1981 and lived in the Chelsea Hotel. She opened a clothing boutique in SoHo that gave exposure to new British names, designers and labels, including Vivienne Westwood, Leigh Bowery, BodyMap, John Galliano, and milliner Stephen Jones. She also helped launch the careers of young American designers Alpana Bawa and Michael Leva, and was a precursor and influence upon the Club Kids movement of the time.

By the late 1980s, the American economy was slowing, and "edgy" clothing was becoming harder to sell; Bartsch began organizing weekly parties at prominent New York nightclubs, such as Savage, Bentley's, and, finally, the Copacabana.

It was the time of AIDS and Bartsch was losing her friends to the epidemic. To raise awareness and money, she organised the first big AIDS charity ball, the Love Ball, in 1989, which raised US $400,000 (equivalent to $1,000,000 in 2025) to help fight HIV and AIDS. For the first time, elements of Harlem ball culture were introduced to a national audience. Bartsch took part in other philanthropic work, like running annual holiday toy-drives with her partner, David Barton.

In 2015, The Museum at FIT mounted an exhibit celebrating Bartsch's costumes. In May 2025, Susanne Bartsch made a return to Switzerland with her exhibition “Transformation!” at Zürich's Museum für Gestaltung. The retrospective presents over 35 of her extravagant fashion looks and coincides with the launch of the Zurich Pride Festival, marking her cultural influence and ongoing creative journey.

== Private life ==
Bartsch has a son, Bailey Bartsch Barton (born 1993), with bodybuilder and gym owner David Barton, whom she married in 1995 and divorced in 2010.

== Filmography ==
- Susanne Bartsch: On Top (2017)
- RuPaul's Drag Race All Stars (2019 & 2025; Season 4 & Season 10), Guest judge
