= Trinity the Tuck =

American drag queen

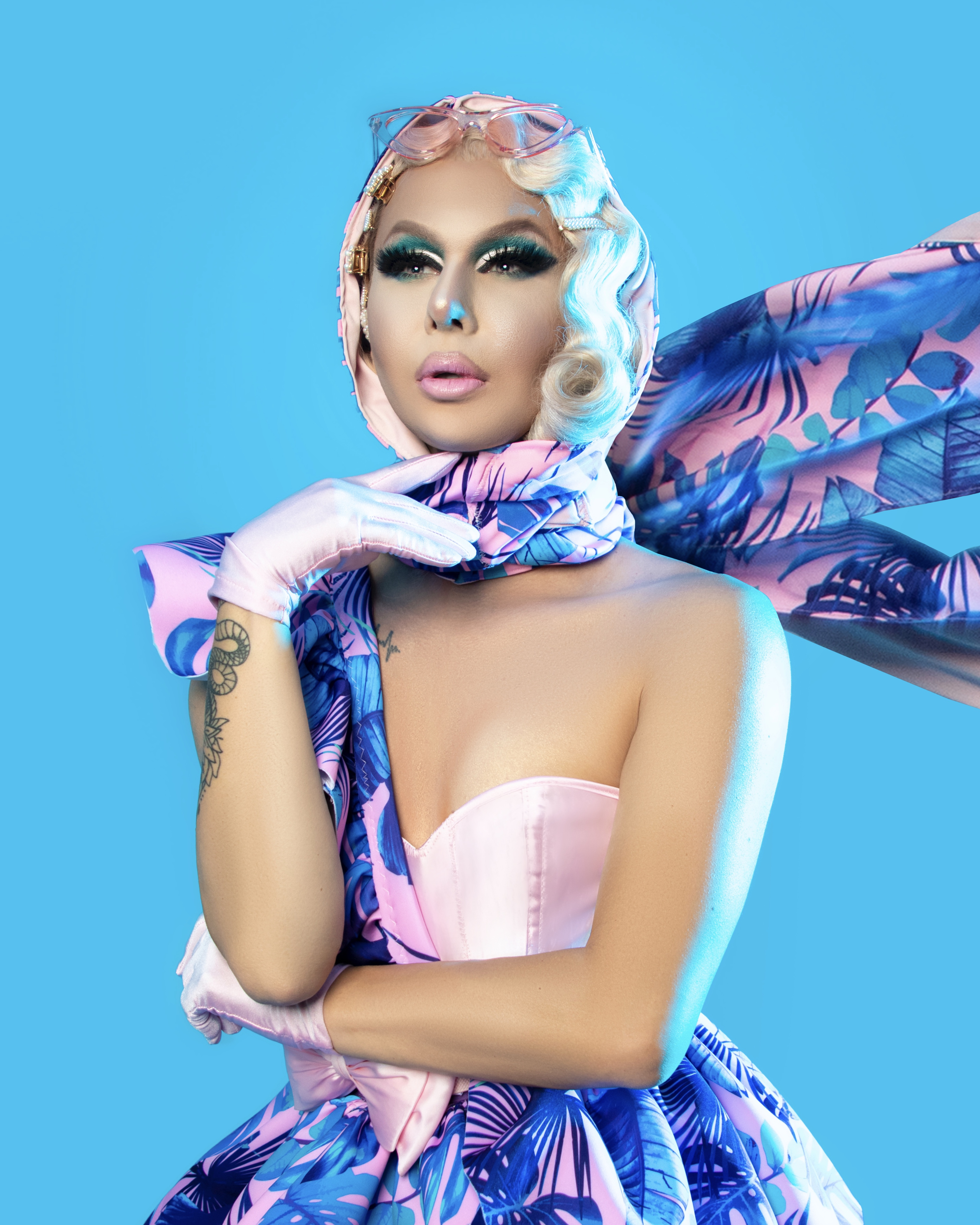
- Trinity The Tuck in 2020
- Born: Ryan A. Taylor; December 10, 1984 (age 41); Birmingham, Alabama, U.S.
- Occupations: Drag queen; television personality; recording artist
- Television: RuPaul's Drag Race (season 9); RuPaul's Drag Race All Stars (season 4, season 7)
- Website: www.trinitythetuck.com

Ryan A. Taylor, known professionally as Trinity "The Tuck" Taylor or just Trinity the Tuck (born December 10, 1984), is an American drag queen, television personality, and recording artist best known for having competed on the ninth season of RuPaul's Drag Race and for having won the fourth season of RuPaul's Drag Race All Stars, shared with Monét X Change. She additionally competed on the seventh season of RuPaul's Drag Race All Stars, placing third.

As a Drag Race contestant, she is known for her crass comedic style, opulent sense of fashion, and eponymous tucking ability, and she currently holds the record for most challenge wins across the franchise, with eleven.

== Early life ==
Taylor was born in Birmingham, Alabama, to April Renee Dunaway and is of Irish descent. Her mother contracted HIV and subsequently died. From the age of 8, Taylor was raised by her grandparents. She grew up in Trussville and Springville, attending Springville High School before dropping out. Her drag mother is Jordan Kennedy and her drag father is legendary male entertainer and pageant promoter/judge, Bob Taylor.

== Career ==
Trinity was named Miss Pulse by Pulse nightclub in 2011. She has won several national pageants, including National Entertainer of the year (against Alyssa Edwards) in 2014 and Miss National Renaissance 2016. She has also performed worldwide as a backup dancer for Andy Bell from Erasure.

=== RuPaul's Drag Race ===
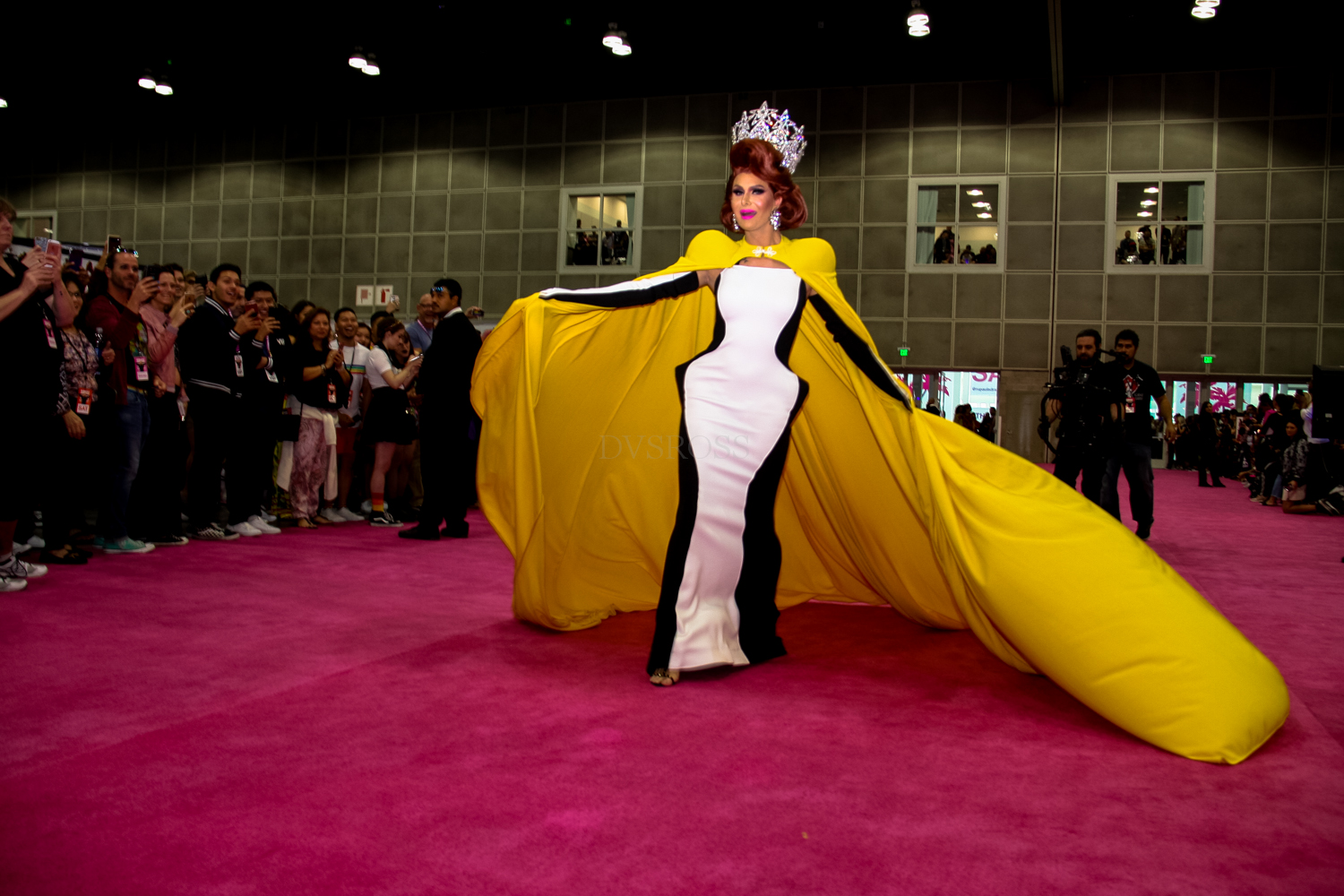
Trinity in 2019

In February 2017, Trinity was announced being among fourteen contestants for the ninth season of RuPaul's Drag Race. She won three challenges during the course of the competition, in episodes three, seven and ten. Trinity placed in the top four overall, after losing a lip sync to "Stronger" by Britney Spears against Peppermint. She was referenced in a skit on Saturday Night Live in May 2017.

Trinity was announced to compete on the fourth season of RuPaul's Drag Race All Stars on November 9, 2018. She was referred to as Trinity the Tuck instead of Trinity Taylor. Following her appearance on All Stars, Trinity was interviewed by Vogue for paying homage to a famous Prada dress worn by Sarah Paulson. Paulson publicly thanked Trinity for the special honor through several of her social media platforms. Trinity later won the season in a tie with Monét X Change, having placed in the top two four times throughout the competition (in episodes one, three, seven, and nine) as well as winning two lipsyncs which gave her the power to eliminate Jasmine Masters in episode one and Latrice Royale in episode nine.

She was cast to be one of ten Drag Race alumni to be on RuPaul's Celebrity Drag Race, where she served as a mentor for Loni Love.

In April 2022, it was announced that Trinity would be competing on the seventh season of RuPaul's Drag Race All Stars, the first all winners edition of the franchise. Trinity won four challenges, resulting in her holding the record for the greatest total number of challenge wins across all franchises (eleven across her three seasons).

=== Other ventures ===
In 2019, Trinity was featured on Botched for lip correction surgery.

On November 3, 2019, Trinity launched her podcast Werk with Trinity the Tuck, which features recurring and special guests. She has also continued to release new episodes of her YouTube series Talking with the Tuck.

Trinity appeared in the music video for the song "You Need to Calm Down" by Taylor Swift as Lady Gaga.

In 2020, Trinity appeared in the Netflix original AJ and the Queen as a well-known pageant drag queen.

Trinity was featured on Out Magazine, Gay Times, PinkNews and various other press publications for her tribute project where she recreated iconic runway looks from previous RuPaul's Drag Race winners. The project, a collaboration with her boyfriend Leo Llanos, has garnered her high praise from fans, Drag Race alumni and press outlets for its captivating imagery and reinvented fashion styles. Trinity, along with her All Stars 4 co-winner Monét X Change, collaborated with Llanos to recreate looks from To Wong Foo to celebrate the end of their reign. In June 2019, a panel of judges from New York magazine placed her 15th on their list of "the most powerful drag queens in America", a ranking of 100 former Drag Race contestants.

In June 2020, Trinity interviewed Cyndi Lauper, as part of the YouTube series We Stan, to talk about the Stonewall Riots and the importance of activism.

In 2020, Trinity launched her all inclusive digital drag competition, Love for the Arts on Twitch, where contestants from all over the world compete to find out which contestant is the best drag artist of them all.

In 2021, Trinity appeared on Celebrity Karaoke Club Drag Edition as a contestant. Trinity ultimately won the competition, beating out fellow Drag Race alumni, Manila Luzon and The Vivienne.

In 2022, Trinity, in partnership with Producer Entertainment Group, launched their own brand of flavored vodka, courtesy of Serv Vodka.

In 2024 Trinity starred as Mama Sue Flay in the Tubi horror comedy film Slay, alongside fellow Drag Race alumni Cara Melle, Crystal Methyd and Heidi N Closet.

=== Music ===
During the first episode of All Stars 4, she premiered an original comedy song titled "The Perfect Tuck" during the episode's variety show and won the challenge. The song was released for digital download on the same day. Her second solo single, a dance track called "The Face, the Body", was released on January 25, 2019. A music video for her third single, "I Call Shade", was released on February 14, 2019, and features Peppermint. The music video has over a million views. Her debut album Plastic premiered at number 9 on the Billboard Comedy Albums chart. She appeared in the music videos for Latrice Royale's "Excuse the Beauty" and Aja's "I Don't Wanna Brag". On November 29, 2019, Trinity released a promotional holiday single called Trinity Ruins Christmas. In 2021, Trinity released Mood Swing, an EP including the singles "Witch" and "Call Me Mommy Daddy" featuring Jozea Flores. The following year, Trinity released the lead single for her album Ego "Walk. Slay. Serv. Repeat."

In November 2023, Trinity partnered with songwriter and producer Drew Louis to release Trinity Ruins Christmas: The Musical, a drag musical album inspired by Charles Dickens' 1843 novella A Christmas Carol and the Grinch. Features on the album are Trinity's fellow RuPaul's Drag Race contestants Alaska Thunderfuck, Ginger Minj, Jimbo, Manila Luzon, and Kylie Sonique Love.

In an interview with Wonderland in February 2024, Drew Louis announced that he and Trinity were working on a new dark-pop album titled Sinematic. In April 2024, Trinity announced via Instagram the lead single "Til Death Becomes Us" with fellow Drag Race contestant Jujubee was coming out April 26, 2024. The single was inspired by the 1992 cult classic film Death Becomes Her. Sinematic was released May 31, 2024, and is a concept album based on the seven deadly sins. She released single "Six Six Sex" alongside Sinematic (Deluxe) featuring Shontelle Sparkles and RuPaul's Drag Race season 17 contestants Sam Star and Jewels Sparkles and drag daughter Shontelle Sparkles.

== Personal life ==
On March 31, 2022, she came out as non-binary. She uses she/they pronouns. She has had plastic surgery, including having her ears pinned and a rhinoplasty by Dr. Miami's Michael Salzhauer.

As of at least mid-2017, Taylor lives in Orlando, Florida.

== Filmography ==
=== Television ===
Year	Title	Role	Notes	Ref
2017	RuPaul's Drag Race (season 9)	Contestant	Finalist	
2018–19	RuPaul's Drag Race All Stars (season 4)	Contestant	Winner	
2019	Botched	Herself	Guest	
2020	AJ and the Queen	Danielle Dupri	Guest appearance; Episode "Dallas"	
2020	RuPaul's Celebrity Drag Race	Herself/Mentor	RuPaul's Drag Race Spin-Off	
2020	Watch What Happens Live with Andy Cohen	Herself	Season 17, Episode 43	
2020	RuPaul's Drag Race All Stars (Season 5)	Herself (Guest)	Episode 8: "Clap Back"	
2021	Celebrity Karaoke Club Drag Edition	Herself/Contestant	Winner	
2022	RuPaul's Drag Race All Stars (season 7)	Contestant	3rd place	
2022	Countdown to All Stars 7: You're a Winner Baby	Herself	VH1 special	
2022	The View	Herself	Guest	
2023	Drag Me to Dinner	Herself	Hulu original	
2024	Slay	Mama Sue Flay	Tubi original film	
2025	Worst Cooks in America: Celebrity Edition	Herself	Contestant	

=== Music videos ===
Year	Title	Artist
2018	"Excuse the Beauty"	Latrice Royale
2018	"I Don't Wanna Brag"	Aja
2019	"The Face The Body"	Herself
2019	"I Call Shade"	Herself
2019	"You Need to Calm Down"	Taylor Swift
2024	"'Til Death Becomes Us"	Herself

=== Web series ===
Year	Title	Role	Notes	Ref
2016–present	Talking with The Tuck	Herself	Ongoing Web Series	
2017	Drag Queen Carpool	Herself	Guest, one episode	
2017	RuPaul's Drag Race: Untucked	Herself	Season 9	
2018	Wow Presents	Herself		
2018	Hey Qween!	Herself	1 Episode	
2018	Cosmopolitan	Herself	Cosmo Queens	
2019–present	Werk with Trinity the Tuck	Host	Podcast	
2020	We Stan	Herself	Web Series	
2020-22	The Pit Stop	Herself (Guest)	3 episodes	
2020	Love for the Arts	Host		
2021	Jack Daniel's Tennessee Fire Presents Drag Queen Summer Glamp	Herself		
2022	Around the Table	Herself	Guest, By Entertainment Weekly	
2022	BuzzFeed Celeb	Herself	Guest	
2022	Friendship Test	Herself	Guest, By Glamour	
2022	Drip or Drop?	Herself	Guest, By Cosmopolitan	

== Discography ==
All credits adapted from Spotify and Apple Music.

=== Studio albums ===
Title	Details	Executive Producer	Peak chart positions
Title	Details	Executive Producer	US Comedy
Plastic	Released: February 22, 2019; Label: Producer Entertainment Group; Formats: Digital download, streaming; Track listing: 1. "The Face, The Body"; 2. "Dear Diary (Interlude)"; 3. "I Call Shade (feat. Peppermint)"; 4. "The Bitch"; 5. "2 for 1 Special (Interlude)"; 6. "Under the Knife"; 7. "She's Werkin'"; 8. "Private Dick (Interlude)"; 9. "Where Are the Jokes?"; 10. "2 B Free"; 11. "...and World Peace (Interlude)"; 12. "M.I.E."; 13. "The Perfect Tuck"	-	9
Ego	Released: July 22, 2022; Label: Self-released; Formats: Digital download, streaming; Track listing: 1. "Walk.Slay.Serv.Repeat."; 2. "Run It (feat. Rhea Litré and Shontelle Sparkles)"; 3. "Twirl"; 4. "Sexology"; 5. "FEMBOYS"; 6. "Come Get It (feat. Monét X Change)"; 7. "She Nasty"; 8. "Southern Hospitality"	Tomas Costanza	-
Trinity Ruins Christmas: The Musical	Released: November 17, 2023; Label: Producer Entertainment Group; Formats: Digital download, streaming	Drew Louis	-
Sinematic	Released: May 31, 2024; Label: Producer Entertainment Group; Formats: Digital download, streaming	Drew Louis	-

=== Extended plays ===
Title	Details
Mood Swing	Released: October 1, 2021; Label: Producer Entertainment Group; Formats: Digital download; Track listing: 1. "Witch"; 2. "Call Me Mommy, Daddy (feat. Jozea Flores)"; 3. "Lie To Me"; 4. "I Call Shade - Drew G Remix"; 5. "The Face, The Body - Erik Vilar Remix"

=== Singles ===
==== As lead artist ====
Title	Year	Album	Writer(s)	Producer(s)
"The Perfect Tuck"	2018	Plastic	Major Scales	Major Scales
"The Face, the Body"	2019	Plastic	Tyler Stone	Markaholic, Tyler Stone
"I Call Shade" (featuring Peppermint)	2019	Plastic	Tyler Stone	Tyler Stone
"Trinity Ruins Christmas"	2019	Non-album single	Ryan Taylor, Mark Byers, Jennifer Whitlock	Mark Byers
"Witch"	2021	Mood Swing	Trinity the Tuck, Tyler Stone	Tyler Stone
"Call Me Mommy, Daddy" (featuring Jozea Flores)	2021	Mood Swing	Tyler Stone	Tyler Stone
"Walk. Slay. Serv. Repeat."	2022	Ego	Tomas Costanza, Trinity the Tuck, Ash Gordon, Paul Coultrop	Tomas Costanza
"Come Get It" (featuring Monét X Change)	2022	Ego	Tomas Costanza, Trinity the Tuck, Ash Gordon, Paul Coultrop	Tomas Costanza
"Femboys"	2022	Ego	Tomas Costanza, Trinity the Tuck, Ash Gordon, Paul Coultrop	Tomas Costanza
"Run It" (featuring Rhea Litré and Shontelle Sparkles)	2022	Ego	Tomas Costanza, Trinity the Tuck, Ash Gordon, Paul Coultrop	Tomas Costanza
"Til Death Becomes Us" (featuring Jujubee)	2024	Sinematic	Drew Louis, Jayelle, Coen Hutton	Drew Louis
"Six Six Sex" (featuring Jewels Sparkles, Sam Star, and Shontelle Sparkles)	2024	Sinematic (Deluxe)	Drew Louis, Jayelle, Coen Hutton	Drew Louis
“It’s A Wrap”	2024	Non-album singles	Drew Louis, Ryan Taylor	Drew Louis
"Haus" (featuring Jewels Sparkles, Sam Star, and Allura The Doll)	2025	Non-album singles	Drew Louis, Ryan Taylor, Allura The Doll	Drew Louis

==== As featured artist ====
Title	Year	Album
"Category Is" (RuPaul featuring Peppermint, Shea Coulee, Sasha Velour, & Trinity Taylor)	2017	Non-album single
"Don't Funk It Up" (RuPaul featuring Trinity The Tuck, Valentina, Manila Luzon, Latrice Royale, & Gia Gunn)	2018	Non-album single
"Super Queen" (RuPaul featuring Naomi Smalls, Monét X Change, Monique Heart, & Trinity The Tuck)	2019	Non-album single
"Legends" (Cast Version) (RuPaul featuring the cast of RuPaul's Drag Race All Stars, season 7)	2022	Non-album single
"Titanic" (MSTR) (with the cast of RuPaul's Drag Race All Stars, season 7)	2022	Non-album single
“Got It From Her” (Sam Star featuring Trinity the Tuck)	2025	Non-album single
“Calling The Corners” (Shontelle Sparkles featuring Angelica Ross, Hym, & Trinity the Tuck)	2025	Butterfly Effect (Deluxe Edition)

== Tours ==
- Werk the World
- War on the Catwalk
- A Drag Queen Christmas
- Haters Roast
- Plastic World Tour

== Awards and nominations ==
Year	Award giving body	Category	Work	Results	Ref.
2019	Reality Television Awards	Fan Favorite	RuPaul's Drag Race	Won	
2019	MTV Video Music Awards	Video of the Year	Taylor Swift's "You Need to Calm Down"	Won	

Preceded by Trixie Mattel	Winner of RuPaul's Drag Race All Stars; US All Stars 4 with Monét X Change	Succeeded by Shea Couleé
