= Monét X Change =

American drag queen (born 1990)

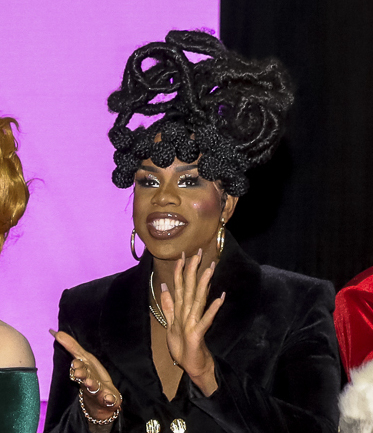
- Monét X Change in 2022
- Born: Kevin Akeem Bertin; February 19, 1990 (age 36); Brooklyn, New York, U.S.
- Citizenship: United States; St. Lucia
- Education: Rider University
- Occupations: Drag queen; singer; television personality; talk show host; podcaster
- Television: RuPaul's Drag Race (season 10); RuPaul's Drag Race All Stars (season 4); RuPaul's Drag Race All Stars (season 7); The Traitors 4
- Musical career
- Instrument: Vocals
- Label: The Randall House
- Website: monetxchange.com

Monét X Change (born February 19, 1990) is the stage name of Kevin Akeem Bertin, an American drag queen, singer, podcaster, and reality television personality. She is known for competing on the tenth season of RuPaul's Drag Race (2018), on which she placed sixth and was crowned the season's Miss Congeniality, and for winning the fourth season of RuPaul's Drag Race All Stars (2018–2019) alongside Trinity the Tuck. She returned to compete in the seventh season of RuPaul's Drag Race All Stars, an all-winners season, where she placed runner-up.

She currently co-hosts the podcast Sibling Rivalry (with Bob the Drag Queen), and formerly hosted Ebony and Irony (with Lady Bunny). She also hosts the Dropout show Monét's Slumber Party and her podcast Monét Talks.

== Early life ==
Bertin was born in Brooklyn, New York City. At six months old, he moved to Castries, Saint Lucia, where he was adopted by his aunt and uncle. He moved back to Brooklyn when he was 10, growing up in East Flatbush, Brooklyn and attended the Professional Performing Arts School in Manhattan. He later moved to The Bronx as an adult. He trained in opera performance at Westminster Choir College of Rider University.

Monét X Change started doing drag in 2012 in New York City. The first drag pageant she won was the sixth annual Gay Caribbean USA Pageant on September 27, 2014, representing Saint Lucia. Her drag sister is RuPaul's Drag Race season 8 winner, Bob the Drag Queen, and her drag mother is Honey Davenport, making her a member of the Davenport drag family.

== Career ==
=== 2018–2022: RuPaul's Drag Race ===
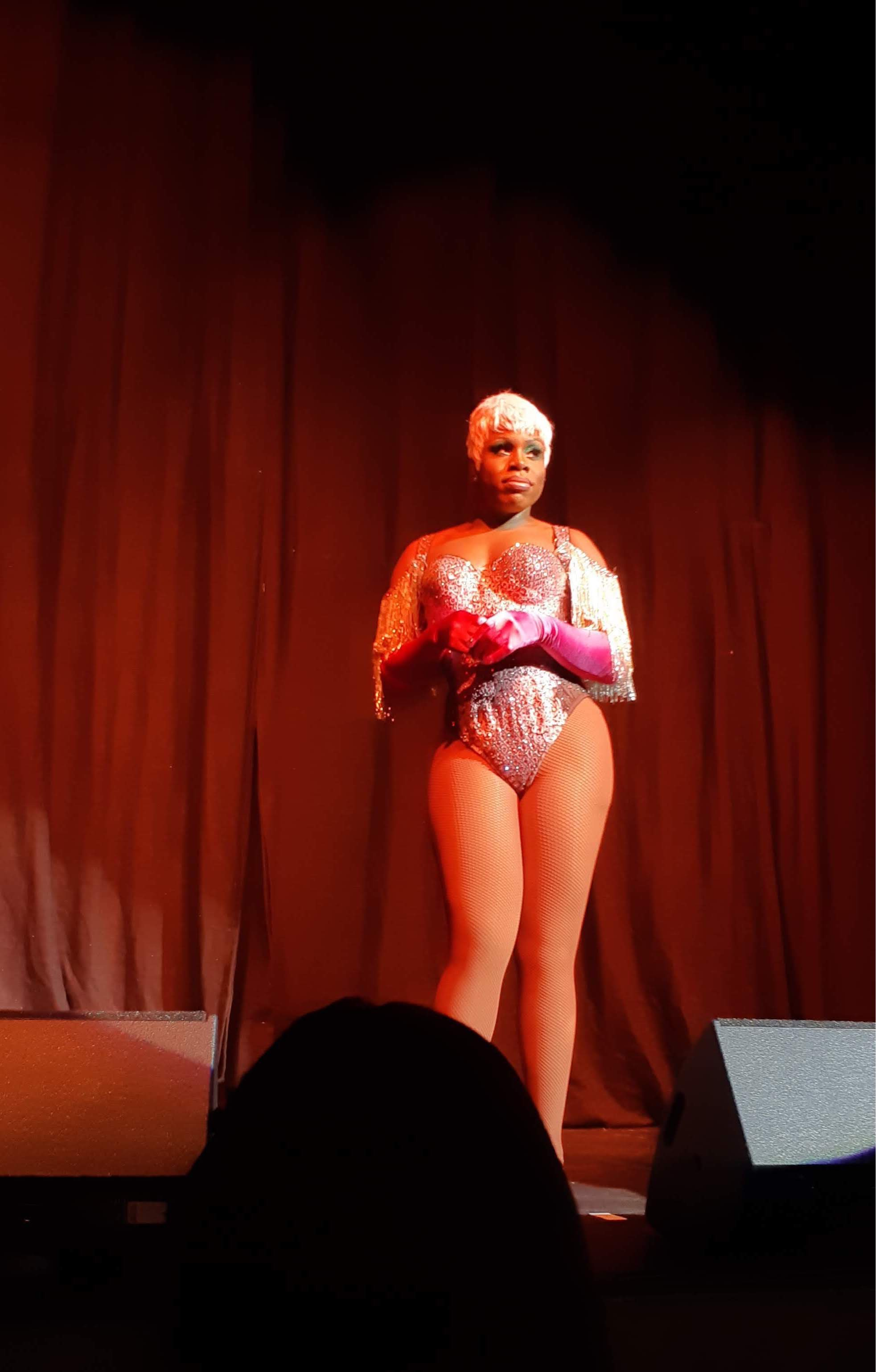
Monét X Change performing in 2019, after competing on season 10 of Drag Race

Monét X Change was announced as one of fourteen contestants competing on the tenth season of RuPaul's Drag Race on February 22, 2018. She had been an alternate for the ninth season but was not cast. She was eliminated in episode ten, placing sixth overall. She was named Miss Congeniality during the season's finale, and is the first holder of the title to have been voted by her fellow contestants. In the first episode of her season of Drag Race, Monét X Change made a dress decorated with kitchen sponges, which became a running joke throughout the rest of the series and inspired a number of Internet memes amongst fans online.

Monét X Change is a co-host of the podcast Sibling Rivalry with her drag sister Bob the Drag Queen. The first episode premiered on March 11, 2018. She appeared as a guest in an episode of What Would You Do on July 6, 2018. Monét also toured across the United States and Europe with her one-person show, "Call Me By Monét."

She appeared in a Pepsi commercial with Cardi B in February 2019. On February 15, 2019, she was inducted into the RuPaul's Drag Race All Stars Hall of Fame alongside Trinity the Tuck after winning RuPaul's Drag Race All Stars Season 4, becoming the first black winner of the spin-off.

In May, Monét revealed that she would be hosting her own weekly talk show called The X Change Rate.

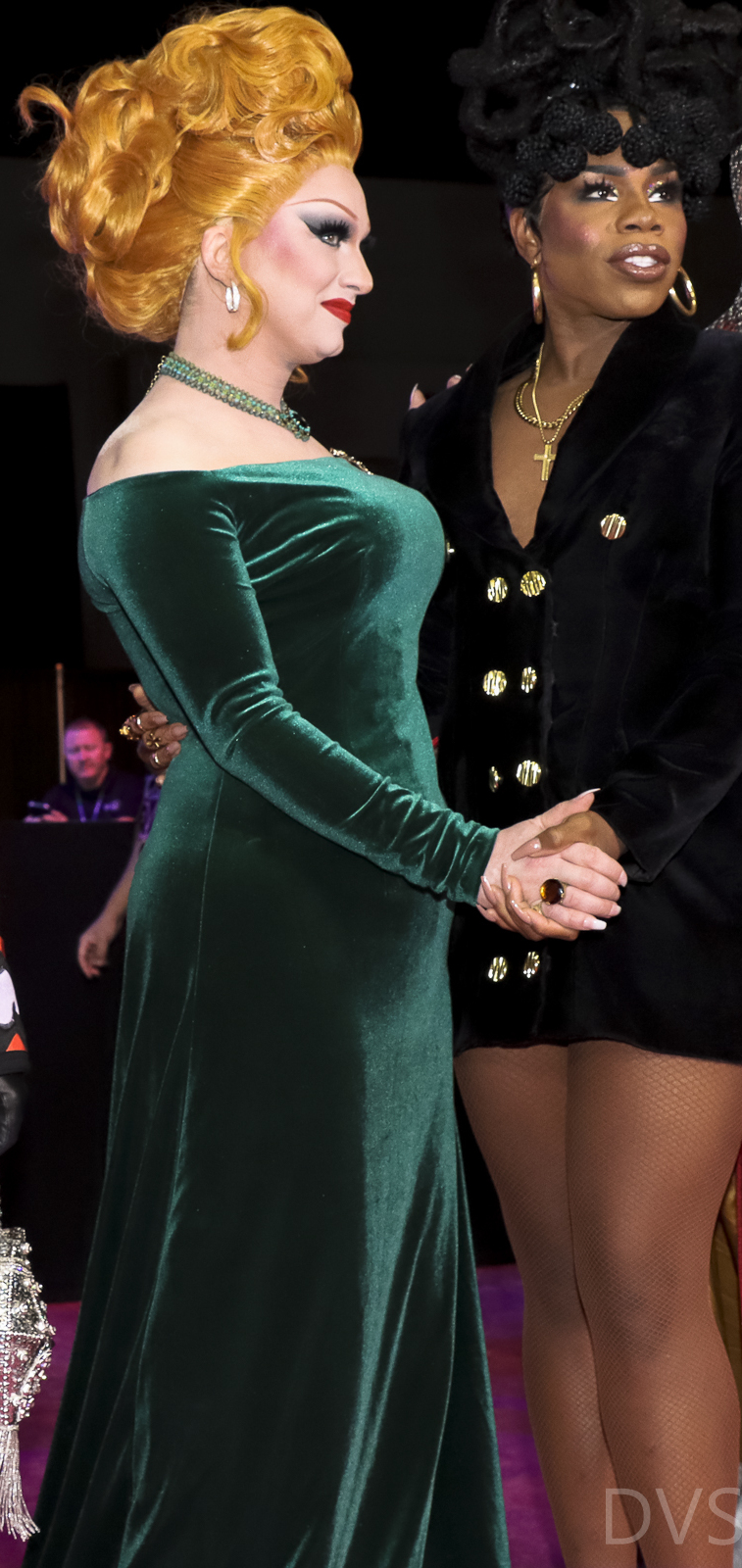
Monét X Change with fellow All Stars season 7 competitor Jinkx Monsoon in 2022

In June 2019, Monét X Change was one of 37 drag queens to be featured on the cover of New York magazine. She was one of the inspirations for Sina Grace's character of Shade, Marvel's first drag queen superhero.

On October 22, 2019, Monét X Change was announced as part of the cast for the first season of RuPaul's Celebrity Drag Race, a Drag Race spin-off where Drag Race alumni transform celebrities into drag queens, which premiered in 2020. In January 2021, she launched another podcast, Ebony and Irony, co-hosted by Lady Bunny. In February 2023, she and Bob the Drag Queen launched their line of cosmetics, BOMO Beauty.

In April 2022, Monét X Change was announced as one of the eight returning winners that would be competing in seventh season of RuPaul's Drag Race All Stars, the first ever all-winners season of Drag Race. During the competition, Monét X Change placed in the top in three competitive episodes, before ultimately finishing as runner-up to winner Jinkx Monsoon.

=== 2023–present: Appearances on Dropout ===
In July 2023, Monét X Change appeared on the Dungeons & Dragons themed show Dungeons and Drag Queens, which was also the 18th season of the actual play anthology series Dimension 20 on Dropout. She later made guest appearances on the Dropout shows Dirty Laundry and Um, Actually. In June 2024, it was announced that Monét X Change will host her own variety talk show on Dropout called Monét's Slumber Party. The first episode premiered on July 19, 2024. In 2025, she reprised her role in the second season of Dungeons and Drag Queens.

In March 2024, she was a guest on the CBS comedy game show After Midnight.

Monét X Change is a founding member of Drag PAC, a political action committee intended to push Gen Z voters to turn out for LGBTQ+ rights for the 2024 United States presidential election.

In March 2026, Monét X Change appeared on Jeopardy! YouTube Edition as a contestant.

In November 2026, it was announced Monét X Change will make their West End debut in Matthew López's The Legend of Georgia McBride @sohoplace in London.

=== Music ===
Bertin is a classically trained opera singer with a bass voice.

Monét X Change released her first original single, "Soak It Up", on May 25, 2018, the same day as her elimination episode on Drag Race. She released her debut EP, Unapologetically, on February 22, 2019. In May 2022, Monét X Change portrayed the voice of Goldie Vandersnatch in Alaska's Drag: The Musical (Studio Cast Recording), a studio recording of a planned stage production about two rival drag bars that go head-to-head while struggling through financial troubles. In February 2023, Monét X Change starred as the Duchess of Krakenthorp in the Minnesota Opera's production of The Daughter of the Regiment.

== Personal life ==
Bertin has two younger brothers from his biological mother, with whom he reconnected in his 30s. His biological father was a drug lord and was executed by a cartel.

Bertin is non-binary and uses she/her and he/him pronouns out of drag.

Bertin has worked with multiple brands including Sephora; Royalty & Legacy, an expansion pack for The Sims 4; Samsung; Audible; Atlantis Events; Tubi; and Cash App.

In September 2025, Bertin announced that he was engaged to his longtime partner Andy Short. In June 2026, Bertin announced on social media that he and Short were no longer in a relationship.

== Filmography ==
=== Film ===
Year	Title	Role	Notes
2018	A Queen for the People	Himself	Documentary by Bob the Drag Queen
2019	The World of Madame X	Drag Queen	Short film by Madonna
2026	Stop! That! Train!	Press	

=== Television ===
Year	Title	Role	Notes	Ref
2017	Dating My Mother	Drag Queen	Television Film	
2018	RuPaul's Drag Race (Season 10)	Himself	Contestant; 6th Place (Miss Congeniality)	
2018	RuPaul's Drag Race: Untucked (Season 9)	Himself	Contestant; 6th Place (Miss Congeniality)	
2018	What Would You Do? (Season 14)	Himself	Guest	
2018–2019	RuPaul's Drag Race All Stars (Season 4)	Himself	Contestant; Winner	
2019–2022	The View	Himself	Guest	
2019	Brunch with Tiffany	Himself	Guest	
2019	RuPaul's Drag Race (Season 11)	Himself	Guest	
2020	RuPaul's Secret Celebrity Drag Race (Season 1)	Himself	Mentor	
2020	RuPaul's Drag Race All Stars (Season 5)	Himself	Guest ("Lip Sync Assassin")	
2020	RuPaul's Drag Race All Stars: Untucked (Season 2)	Himself	Guest ("Lip Sync Assassin")	
2020	Lovecraft Country	Himself	Drag Queen; Episode: "Strange Case"	
2021	The Sherry Vine Variety Show	Himself	Guest appearance	
2021	CBS This Morning	Himself	Guest	
2021	The Bachelorette (Season 17)	Himself	Guest	
2021	KVVU-TV	Himself	Guest	
2022	Getting Curious with Jonathan Van Ness	Himself	Netflix original	
2022	Close Enough	Margo (voice)	HBO Max original	
2022	The Kelly Clarkson Show	Himself	Guest	
2022	RuPaul's Drag Race All Stars (Season 7)	Himself	Contestant; Runner-up	
2022	RuPaul's Drag Race All Stars: Untucked (Season 4)	Himself	Contestant; Runner-up	
2022	Countdown to All Stars 7: You're a Winner Baby	Himself	VH1 special	
2022	Trixie Motel	Himself	Guest	
2022	RuPaul's Secret Celebrity Drag Race (Season 2)	Himself	"Queen Supreme Mentor"	
2022	Huluween Dragstravaganza	Himself	Hulu original	
2022	Dr. Jackie: Unlicensed Therapist	Himself	OUTtv original	
2022	Canada's Drag Race: Canada vs. the World (Season 1)	Himself	Guest judge	
2023	The Simpsons	Himself	Episode: "My Life as a Vlog"	
2024	RuPaul's Drag Race All Stars (Season 9)	Himself	Special guest; Episode: "Snatch Game of Love"	
2024	Everybody Still Hates Chris	Titney Houston (voice)	Episode: "Everybody Still Hates Bullies"	
2025	Survival of the Thickest	Himself	Guest	
2026	The Traitors (Season 4)	Himself	Contestant (Eliminated; 17th place)	

=== Theatre ===
Year	Title	Role	Theatre	Ref(s)
2020	Death Drop	Summer Raines	Garrick Theatre	

=== Web series ===
Year	Title	Role	Notes	Ref(s)
2017	Daniel's Desk	Himself	Episode 1 Guest	
2018	Monét's Herstory X Change	Himself	Host	
2018	Queen to Queen	Himself	Guest, with Miz Cracker	
2018	Countdown to the Crown	Himself	Season 10	
2018	Cosmo Queens	Himself	Season Three, episode Nine	
2018–2019	Fashion Photo RuView	Himself	Special guest, Two episodes	
2018–Present	Sibling Rivalry	Himself	Host	
2019	Review with a Jew	Himself	Guest, All Stars 4 Episode 3	
2019	Ask Me Another	Himself	Podcast; guest	
2019	Monét XPosé	Himself	Host	
2019	Camp Confessions	Himself	Guest, Episode 34	
2019–2021	The X Change Rate	Himself	Host, Executive Producer	
2019	Detailz	Himself	Guest	
2020	The Pit Stop	Himself	Guest; 2 episodes	
2020	Bob Live!	Himself	Guest	
2020	Werq the World	Himself	Featured queen	
2020	Pepp Talks	Himself	Guest	
2021	I Like to Watch UK	Himself	Guest; 3 episodes	
2021	Macbeth	Three Witches	Play on Podcast Production	
2021	Ugh! You're So Good!	Himself	Podcast; guest	
2021	Hive Minds are Better Than One	Himself	Guest	
2021	Drag Tots	Error Message	Season 2	
2022	The Pit Stop	Himself	Season 14 Host	
2022	The Plant Based Way with Monét	Himself	Host	
2022	Around the Table	Himself	Guest	
2022	BuzzFeed Celeb	Himself	Guest	
2022	Friendship Test	Himself	Guest	
2022	Drip Or Drop?	Himself	Guest	
2022	Portrait of a Queen	Himself	Guest	
2022	Bullseye with Jesse Thorn	Himself	Podcast; Guest	
2023	Sissy That Talk Show with Joseph Shepherd	Himself	Podcast; Guest	
2023	Glam Slam	Himself	Host	
2023	Dirty Laundry	Himself	Episode: "Who Came Out to Their High School Girlfriend Via Jesus Christ?"	
2023, 2025	Dimension 20: Dungeons and Drag Queens	Troyánn	Main role; 10 episodes	
2024	Monét's Slumber Party	Himself	Host; 6 episodes	
2024	Um, Actually	Himself	Episode: "Justice League, The Legend of Zelda, Animal Crossing"	
2024–Present	Monét Talks	Himself	Host	
2025	Parlor Room	Himself	Episode: "Monikers"	
2026	Jeopardy! YouTube Edition	Himself	Guest	

== Discography ==
=== Albums ===
==== Comedy albums ====
Title	Details
Fist of Glory	Released: June 16, 2023; Label: Comedy Dynamics; Formats: Digital download, streaming

=== Extended plays ===
Title	Details	Peak chart positions	
Title	Details	US Heat	US Indie
Unapologetically	Released: February 22, 2019; Label: The Randall House; Formats: Digital download, streaming	18	25
Unapologetically: Live Acoustic Session	Released: November 26, 2020; Label: Self-released; Formats: Digital download, streaming	—	—
Grey Rainbow, Vol. 1	Released: May 17, 2024; Label: Producer Entertainment Group; Formats: Digital download, streaming; Track listing: 1. "Grey Rainbow"; 2. "U on U"; 3. "Too Bad"; 4. "Like What I Like"; 5. "Rotation (feat. London Hill)"; 6. "Streetlight"; 7. "Brayla's Rainbow"; 8. "Body"	—	—

=== Singles ===
==== As lead artist ====
Title	Year	Album
"Soak It Up" (solo or featuring Bob the Drag Queen)	2018	non-album single
"There for You"	2019	Unapologetically
"March"	2020	non-album singles
"Love Like This"	2021	non-album singles
"Vi ravviso, o luoghi ameni"	2022	non-album singles
"The Big Opening" (with Ginger Minj and the cast of Huluween Dragstravaganza)	2022	Huluween Dragstravaganza
"Body"	2024	Grey Rainbow, Vol.1

==== Featured singles ====
Title	Year	Album
"Cher: The Unauthorized Rusical" (RuPaul featuring Aquaria, Eureka, Kameron Michaels, Miz Cracker, Monét X Change, and The Vixen)	2018	non-album singles
"Errybody Say Love" (RuPaul featuring Naomi Smalls, Monique Heart, Farrah Moan, and Monét X Change)	2018	non-album singles
"Super Queen (Cast Version)" (RuPaul featuring Naomi Smalls, Monique Heart, Monét X Change, and Trinity the Tuck)	2019	non-album singles
"Legends" (Cast Version) (RuPaul featuring the cast of RuPaul's Drag Race All Stars, season 7)	2022	non-album singles
"Titanic" (MSTR) (The cast of RuPaul's Drag Race All Stars, season 7)	2022	non-album singles

=== Music videos ===
Year	Title	Artist	Ref(s)
2016	"Fantasy"	Acid Betty	
2018	"Strange Fruit"	Himself	
2018	"Soak It Up"	Himself	
2019	"Unapologetically: The Visual EP"	Himself	
2019	"God Control"	Madonna	
2020	"Mask, Glove, Soap, Scrubs"	Todrick Hall	
2020	"March"	Himself	
2021	"Love Like This"	Himself	

== Awards and nominations ==
Year	Award	Category	Work	Result	Ref.
2019	WOWIE Awards	Best Podcast	Sibling Rivalry	Nominated	
2021	Queerty Awards	Podcast	Sibling Rivalry	Nominated	
2022	Queerty Awards	Podcast	Sibling Rivalry	Nominated	
2022	WOWIE Awards	Best Podcast	Sibling Rivalry	Nominated	
2022	WOWIE Awards	Best TV Moment	The Bachelorette (with Shea Couleé)	Nominated	
2023	Queerty Awards	Podcast	Sibling Rivalry	Won	
2023	GLAAD Media Awards	Outstanding Podcast	Sibling Rivalry	Won	
2023	Webby Awards	Podcasts - Diversity, Equity & Inclusion (People's Voice)	Sibling Rivalry	Won	
2024	GLAAD Media Awards	Outstanding Podcast	Sibling Rivalry	Nominated	
2025	GLAAD Media Awards	Outstanding Podcast	Sibling Rivalry	Nominated	
2025	Queerty Awards	Best Web Series	Dungeons and Drag Queens	Won	

== See also ==
- Drag culture in New York City
- LGBTQ culture in New York City
- List of LGBTQ people in New York City

Preceded by Trixie Mattel	Winner of RuPaul's Drag Race All Stars; US All Stars 4 with Trinity the Tuck	Succeeded by Shea Couleé
