= Trixie Mattel discography =

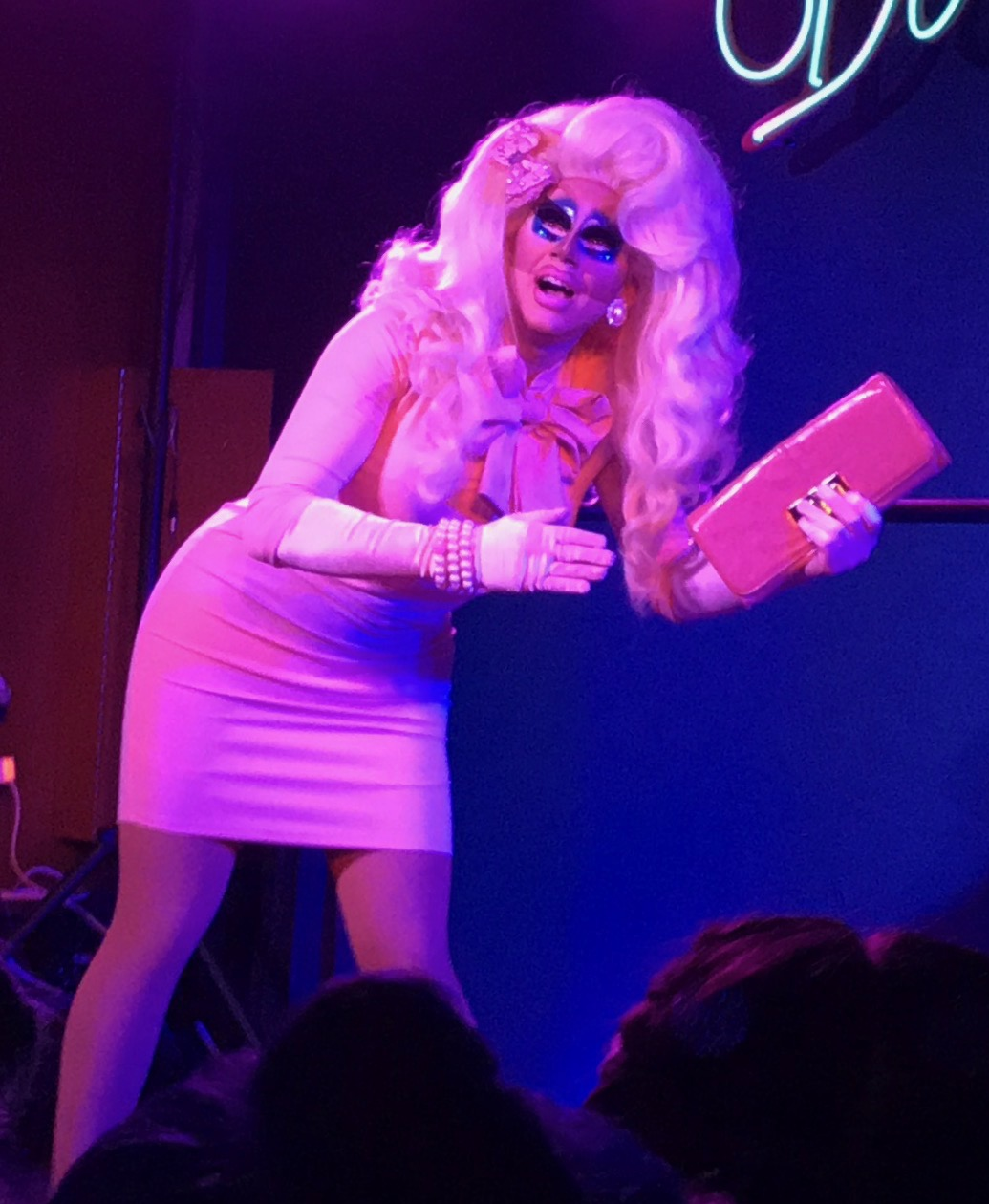
- Trixie Mattel performing in 2017
- Studio albums: 4
- EPs: 6
- Compilation albums: 1
- Singles: 22
- Music videos: 17
- Remixes: 7

The discography of American drag queen, singer-songwriter, and comedian Trixie Mattel consists of four studio albums, six extended plays, one compilation album, twenty-two singles (including five as a featured artist), ten promotional singles, seven remixes, and seventeen music videos.

== Albums ==
=== Studio albums ===
List of studio albums, with selected chart positions, showing other relevant details
Title	Details	Peak chart positions								
Title	Details	US Curr.	US Folk	US Indie	US Heat.	AUS	NZ Heat.	SCO	UK Cou.	UK Ind.
Two Birds	Released: May 2, 2017; Label: Self-released; Formats: CD, digital download	57	16	6	2	—	9	93	5	28
One Stone	Released: March 16, 2018; Label: Self-released; Formats: CD, digital download	58	16	10	1	85	—	66	—	19
Barbara	Released: February 7, 2020; Label: PEG, ATO; Formats: CD, LP, digital download, streaming	66	—	—	—	— (Note: Barbara did not enter the ARIA Albums Chart, but peaked at number 21 on the ARIA Digital Album Chart.)	—	—	—	— (Note: Barbara did not enter the UK Independent Albums Chart, but peaked at number 16 on the UK Indie Album Breakers Chart.)
The Blonde & Pink Albums	Released: June 24, 2022; Label: PEG; Formats: LP, CD, digital download, streaming	42	—	—	17	—	—	—	—	50
"—" denotes a recording that did not chart or was not released in that territory.

=== Compilation albums ===
List of studio albums, with selected chart positions, showing other relevant details
Title	Details	Peak chart positions			
Title	Details	US Heat	US Ind.	US Folk	US Rock Sales
Two Birds/One Stone	Released: November 30, 2018; Label: ATO; Formats: CD, LP	7	36	19	48

== Extended plays ==
List of extended plays, with other relevant details
Title	Album details
Greener (as Brian Firkus)	Released: 2009; Label: Self-released; Format: CD
Homemade Christmas	Released: December 1, 2017; Label: Self-released; Format: Digital download, streaming
Trixie Mattel: Moving Parts (The Acoustic Soundtrack)	Released: December 20, 2019; Label: Producer Entertainment Group; Format: Digital download
Full Coverage, Vol. 1	Released: April 30, 2021; Label: Producer Entertainment Group; Format: LP, Digital download, streaming
Looking Good, Feeling Gorgeous	Released: June 2, 2023; Label: Producer Entertainment Group; Format: Digital download, streaming; Track listing: 1. "Looking Good, Feeling Gorgeous" (radio mix); 2. "Looking Good, Feeling Gorgeous" (extended mix); 3. "Looking Good, Feeling Gorgeous" (acapella); 4. "Looking Good, Feeling Gorgeous" (instrumental); 5. "Solid Pink Disco"
BOP! (with Vanessa Williams and Lion Babe)	Released: July 26, 2024; Label: Mellian Music, Mod Squad; Format: Digital download, streaming
'Till Death Do Us Part	Released: October 2, 2026; Label: Producer Entertainment Group; Format: Digital download, streaming; Track listing: 1. "'Till Death Do Us Part"; 2. "Polish Moon"; 3. "Ghost on the Moon"; 4. "Vampire"; 5. "I'm in Love with a Ghost"; 6. "Tell Me When It's Over"

== Singles ==
=== As lead artist ===
Title	Year	Peak chart positions		Album
Title	Year	SCO	UK DL	Album
"Mama Don't Make Me Put On the Dress Again"	2017	—	—	Two Birds
"Moving Parts (Acoustic)" (Note: The studio version of "Moving Parts" is included on One Stone.)	2018	83	—	Non-album singles
"Yellow Cloud"	2019	—	—	Non-album singles
"Malibu"	2020	—	—	Barbara
"Stranger" (featuring Lavender Country)	2020	—	—	Non-album single
"Video Games"	2020	66	89	Full Coverage, Vol. 1
"Blister in the Sun"	2021	—	—	Full Coverage, Vol. 1
"Jackson" (featuring Orville Peck)	2021	—	—	Full Coverage, Vol. 1
"Hello Hello"	2021	—	—	The Blonde & Pink Albums
"This Town" (featuring Shakey Graves)	2022	—	—	The Blonde & Pink Albums
"C'mon Loretta"	2022	—	—	The Blonde & Pink Albums
"White Rabbit" (featuring Michelle Branch)	2022	—	—	The Blonde & Pink Albums
"Looking Good, Feeling Gorgeous"	2023	—	—	Looking Good, Feeling Gorgeous
"Bop!" (with Vanessa Williams and Lion Babe)	2024	—	—	Bop! and Survivor
“Supermodel (You Betta Work)“ (featuring Vincint)	2025	—	—	Non-album singles
"Gay HBO Max Song"	2025	—	—	Non-album singles
"Ring My Bell" (with VNSSA)	2025	—	—	Non-album singles
“Hella Good” (with Bonnie McKee)	2026	—	—	Non-album singles
"Hung Up"	2026	—	—	Non-album singles
“Turn Me On” (with Jayelle)	2026	—	—	Non-album singles
"—" denotes a recording that did not chart or was not released in that territory.

=== As featured artist ===
Title	Year	Peak chart positions	Album
Title	Year	US Elec.	Album
"Drag Up Your Life" (RuPaul featuring The Cast of RuPaul's Drag Race All Stars, Season 3)	2018	—	Non-album singles
"Kitty Girl (All Stars 3 Remix)" (RuPaul featuring The Cast of RuPaul's Drag Race All Stars, Season 3)	2018	18	Non-album singles
"Ding Dong! (Vigiletti Remix)" (Katya featuring Trixie Mattel)	2021	—	Vampire Fitness (Remixed)
"Cosmic Colors" (Ash Gordon featuring Trixie Mattel)	2022	—	Ash Gordon
"Red Side of The Moon" (The Wild Things featuring Trixie Mattel)	2023	—	Friends With Benefits

=== Promotional singles ===
Title	Year	Album
"I'll Wear Your Ring (Acoustic Demo)"	2017	Non-album single
"Break Your Heart"	2018	One Stone
"Little Sister (Studio City Acoustic)" (with Brandon James Gwinn)	2018	Non-album single
"Jesse Jesse"	2020	Malibu
"Gold"	2020	Malibu
"We Got the Look"	2020	Malibu
"Ding Dong!" (Katya featuring Trixie Mattel)	2020	Vampire Fitness
"Red Side of The Moon (Live)" (The Wild Things featuring Trixie Mattel)	2023	Non-album singles
"Seen My Man" / "Shadow" (Spotify Singles)	2024	Non-album singles
"Bad Woman (Trixie Mattel Remix)" (with Paloma Faith)	2025	Non-album singles

== Other charted songs ==
Title	Year	Peak chart positions	Album
Title	Year	US Comedy Digital	Album
"Christmas Without You"	2017	4	Homemade Christmas
"The Night Before Contact" (featuring Katya Zamolodchikova)	2017	5	Homemade Christmas
"All I Want for Christmas Is Nudes"	2017	3	Homemade Christmas

== Other appearances ==
Title	Year	Other artist(s)	Album
"Geronimo"	2015	RuPaul	RuPaul Presents CoverGurlz 2
"Eggs"	2016	Lucian Piane, Ginger Minj	RuPaul's Drag Race: The Rusical
"Aileen" (Jolene parody)	2018	Willam Belli	Now That's What I Call Drag Music, Vol. 1
"Chapstick"	2019	Todrick Hall	Haus Party, Pt. 1
"Ding Dong!"	2020	Katya	Vampire Fitness
"Ding Dong!" (Markaholic remix)	2021	Katya	Vampire Fitness (Remixed)
"Play (Trixie Mattel Remix)"	2026	Jennifer Lopez, Drew Louis	J.Lo (25th Anniversary Edition)

== Remixes ==
Title	Year	Artist(s)
Official remixes
"Bad Woman" (Trixie Mattel Remix)	2025	Paloma Faith
"Play" (Trixie Mattel Remix)	2026	Jennifer Lopez
"Same Parts" (Trixie Mattel Remix)	2026	Tatianna featuring Katya
"I'll Believe in Anything" (Trixie Mattel Remix)	2026	Wolf Parade
Unofficial remixes
"My Humps" (Trixie Mattel Remix)	2023	Black Eyed Peas
"Barbie Girl" ("I'm Your Dolly" Trixie Mattel Remix)	2024	Aqua
"Her" (Trixie Remix)	2024	Megan Thee Stallion
"Pump It Up! (Endor Remix)" (Trixie Remix)	2025	Danzel, Endor
"Sugar, Spice & Everything Nice"	2025	Original remix/Mash-up
"The Little House" (Trixie Remix)	2025	David Rose

== Music videos ==
=== As lead artist ===
Title	Year	Director	Ref.
"Mama Don't Make Me Put On the Dress Again"	2017	Billy Butler	
"Break Your Heart"	2018	Billy Butler	
"Little Sister" (Studio City Acoustic) (with Brandon James Gwinn)	2018	—N/a	
"Yellow Cloud"	2019	Brad Hammer	
"Jesse Jesse"	2020	The Gordh Brothers	
"Gold"	2020	The Daniel Gordh	
"Malibu"	2020	The Daniel Gordh	
"We Got the Look"	2020	Trixie Mattel	
"Stranger" (featuring Lavender Country)	2020	Dekel Lazimi-Lev	
"Video Games"	2020	Nick Goldston	
"Blister in the Sun"	2021	Assaad Yacoub	
"Jackson" (featuring Orville Peck)	2021	Assaad Yacoub	
"Hello Hello"	2021	Assaad Yacoub	
"This Town" (featuring Shakey Graves)	2022	Matt Amato	
"C'mon Loretta"	2022	Assaad Yacoub	
"White Rabbit" (featuring Michelle Branch)	2022	Assaad Yacoub	
"Looking Good, Feeling Gorgeous"	2023	Assaad Yacoub	

=== As featured performer ===
Title	Artist(s)	Year	Director
"The T"	Alaska Thunderfuck, Adore Delano	2016	Ben Simkins
"Kitty Girl"	RuPaul, Kennedy Davenport, Trixie Mattel, Shangela, BeBe Zahara Benet	2018	—N/a
"Super Queen"	RuPaul, Monét X Change, Monique Heart, Naomi Smalls, Trinity the Tuck	2019	—N/a
"Started"	Iggy Azalea	2019	Colin Tilley
"Ding Dong"	Katya, Trixie Mattel	2020	Andrew Yang
