= Gagged (EP) =

2015 extended play by Violet Chachki

EP by Violet Chachki
- Released: June 30, 2015
- Genre: Dance-pop; glam rock; queer punk
- Length: 16:17
- Label: Sidecar; Producer Entertainment Group
- Producer: Tomas J. Costanza; Tommy Lee

Singles from Gagged
- 1. "Bettie" Released: June 2, 2015; 2. "Vanguard" Released: June 30, 2015

Gagged is an extended play (EP) by American drag queen Violet Chachki—a stage persona of Paul Jason Dardo—that was digitally released on June 30, 2015, through Sidecar Records and Producer Entertainment Group. Violet, who won the seventh season of the reality competition series RuPaul's Drag Race, decided to record an EP to expand her brand and to have her own music to use for videos and live performances. She was inspired by her experience as a dominatrix's assistant, and by the branding and merchandising work of Drag Race host RuPaul. Violet wrote all of the songs on Gagged with Tomas Costanza and Ashley Gordon. Mötley Crüe drummer Tommy Lee co-wrote and co-produced a track for the EP.

The EP is a collection of dance-pop, glam rock, and queer punk tracks that discuss sex, confidence, gender expression, gender identity, and gender norms. Violet wanted her music to reflect her background of modeling and performing in nightclubs in Atlanta. Violet referred to the EP as industrial music and electronic dance music (EDM). Music critics identified the EP's BDSM influences, most notably in its title. Violet likened her vocals to talking and did not view herself as a singer.

Gagged received positive reviews from critics, who praised its production and overall approach, as well as Violet's personality. The EP was supported by two singles—"Bettie" and "Vanguard"—and both were promoted with music videos. Both songs and videos were highlighted in reviews. Critics considered "Bettie" one of the best songs by a RuPaul's Drag Race contestant, and Violet's aerial silk performance in the music video for "Vanguard" received praise. Gagged appeared on three US Billboard charts, peaking at number 11 on the Top Dance Albums chart, and at number 48 on the Independent Albums and the Heatseekers Albums charts.

== Background and recording ==
Paul Jason Dardo started performing in drag as Violet Chachki at age 19. She (Note: Violet Chachki uses both she/her and they/them pronouns. The article uses feminine pronouns for Violet for consistency, and to match what is used in the citations.) was mainly inspired by Bettie Page, a 1950s BDSM and pin-up model, and by sexual fetishism in general; Violet felt drawn to "the severity of it", and viewed it as an "extreme form of glamour and sexuality". She modeled and performed in nightclubs in Atlanta, learning from other drag queens and from the Internet, and studied fashion design at the Savannah College of Art and Design for a year. After auditioning for the sixth season of the reality competition television show RuPaul's Drag Race, Violet Chachki participated in and won its seventh season in 2015. As part of her participation in the show, Violt recorded a parody of RuPaul's 2014 single "Sissy That Walk", took part in a musical adaptation of a scene from John Waters's 1972 film Pink Flamingos, and performed a cover version of RuPaul's 2007 song "Drop That Pimp" for the 2015 compilation album RuPaul Presents: CoverGurlz 2.

I wanted to create something as a sort of soundtrack to the avant-garde visuals I create. I love fetish because the line between right and wrong is blurred in a controlled, safe way. It is harmless fun that can really give new meaning to someone's otherwise humdrum life. I also love the fashion!

—Violet Chachki, World of Wonder (2015)

RuPaul inspired Violet to further pursue music. She wanted to emulate RuPaul's focus on branding and merchandising, describing music as a way to "present a total package to people". Violet preferred to have her own songs for performances and videos. In the HuffPost, Oscar Raymundo wondered if this approach was indicative of drag's future, with "queen as auteur with complete creative control". Violet was also inspired by clowns and her work as a dominatrix's assistant. She described herself as a visual person who often feels like a clown, which she said was "kind of the only visual people had for entertainment" in the past. In a 2025 interview with Out, Violet said she first released music to promote herself as "fetish-y [and] dark", and to develop those aspects of her drag persona.

For Gagged, Violet co-wrote all five of its tracks with Tomas J. Costanza and Ashley Gordon, (Note: Several articles refer to Gagged as an album rather than an EP, and during an interview with Gay Times, Violet also referred to it as an album.) who have frequently worked on music with drag queens. The Guardian's Brian O'Flynn listed Constanza as an example of how RuPaul's Drag Race contestants often collaborate with the same songwriters and producers, typically for music he considered "straight-to-dancefloor, bass-heavy bangers". Mötley Crüe drummer Tommy Lee co-wrote and co-produced the song "Bettie" after he was contacted and asked to send any "racy and bad ass" songs to Violet. Costanza co-produced and mixed "Bettie", which was recorded at the Killingsworth Recording Company and mastered by Tom Coyne.

== Music and lyrics ==
Critics had varying opinions of Gagged's genre, referring to it as dance-pop, glam rock, and queer punk. Tiffany Frandsen for Salt Lake City Weekly referred to the EP as "dance-pop electronic erotica". Violet described Gagged as industrial music and electronic dance music (EDM), and said it was influenced by music she would listen to while drinking wine. She wanted her music to reflect her background in nightclubs, describing her goal for the EP as bringing "a drag queen album to the next level". In Harper's Bazaar India, Jishnu Bandyopadhyay said Violet's music has a "dark, more industrial sound" he considered a "sonic counterpoint to the dazzling persona she presents on stage".

Violet said "Bettie", which she called dark, sexy, and upbeat, is representative of the EP. Critics have identified the song's genre as EDM, electroclash, electronic music, and industrial music. The track's production includes what Pitchfork's Andy Emitt called "drum-machine pounding", a "grating, wobbly synth riff", race car sounds, and "digital androgyne cries of 'ohh!'".

Gagged is about sex, confidence, gender expression, gender identity, and gender norms. Violet identified confidence as her primary message, especially when playing with gender. Gender norms are both referenced and subverted in "Bettie"; Dallas Voice's J. Denton Bricker noted the lyrics address "fetish roles and presentation versus reality". Billboard journalists noted BDSM influences throughout the EP. Oscar Raymundo said by titling the EP Gagged, Violet shows she is a "fetish queen at heart". Metro Weekly's Connor J. Hogan said Violet is "reminding us who's in charge" with the EP, which he said focuses on bondage.

Frandsen interpreted the song titles "Harlequin", "Vanguard", and "Show Off" as having "no shame, no secrets". "Vanguard" is about ways queer people can find support and strength together, which Violet likened to a military unit, and being a leader in the drag community. While promoting Gagged, Violet did not identify herself as a singer, saying she used "more sexy talking and raspy vocals, dark and fetishy". According to Emitt, Violet performs "Bettie" with a "scratchy voice", which he compared to Madonna's vocals on her 1992 single "Erotica".

== Release and promotion ==
Sidecar Records and Producer Entertainment Group released Gagged on June 30, 2015, on digital outlets such as the iTunes Store and streaming services. It was later credited as being released through Violet Chachki LLC. The EP has appeared on three US Billboard charts, peaking at number 11 on the Top Dance Albums chart, and number 48 on the Independent Albums and the Heatseekers Albums charts. In 2025, Violet said she had forgotten about her older music and had considered removing some of her songs from Spotify. Bernardo Sim of Out wrote she may not identify with the "freak-in-the-sheets" persona for "Bettie".

=== Singles ===
"Bettie" was released as Gagged's lead single on June 2, 2015, and was supported by a music video that premiered the previous day. The top-three finalists of RuPaul's Drag Race's seventh season—Violet, Ginger Minj, and Pearl—released music videos for their singles on the same day. Michael Serrato directed the video for "Bettie", which begins in a kitchen with Violet styled as what Tiffany Frandsen described as a "bored but sensual Donna Reed". The tone shifts in the song's chorus as Violet sexually dominates two young men and uses erotic electrostimulation on them. Violet wanted the video to explore dualities in sexual fetishism, and was inspired by the way Bettie Page stopped modeling to become a born-again Christian. Music critics named "Bettie" as one of the best songs by a RuPaul's Drag Race contestant. Andy Emitt praised the single and its music video for challenging typical depictions of sexuality, especially by having a femme, genderqueer person as the dominant.

"Vanguard" was promoted as Gagged's second single on June 30, 2015. In the music video, which was also directed by Serrato, transphobic men target Violet at a fast-food restaurant, and customers help her fight against them. The video was inspired by an incident in which Violet was harassed in an Australian McDonald's, although she said it did not involve a physical confrontation. Scenes depicting the incident are interspersed with scenes showing Violet stripteasing as part of an aerial silk performance, which was highlighted in reviews.

== Critical reception ==
Gagged received a positive response from some critics for its production and overall approach. Joe Lynch for Billboard appreciated that Violet avoided camp in favor of a more artistic style for her music. (Note: Camp is often associated with drag queens.) In Out & About Newspaper, Stephen Wyatt said EP contains "five dynamic club tracks that make you want to get up and dance", and Tiffany Frandsen described the songs as "smoky, coy, and energetic". Violet's attitude on Gagged was also praised. While discussing the EP, Frandsen said Violet consistently demonstrated a sense of confidence, and J. Denton Bricker said she had a "unique and enduring spunkiness".

== Track listing ==
All tracks were written by Violet Chachki, Tomas J. Costanza, and Ashley Gordon, except where noted. Credits adapted from Spotify and WOW Presents Plus: (Note: Gagged is only available digitally, and streaming services, such as Spotify, only credit songwriters for the tracks. WOW Presents Plus offers more complete credits for the song "Bettie".)

No.	Title	Writer(s)	Producer(s)	Length
1.	"Bettie"	Tommy Lee; Ashley Gordon; Tomas J. Costanza; Violet Chachki	Costanza; Lee	3:09
2.	"Harlequin"			3:31
3.	"La Petite Mort"			2:53
4.	"Vanguard"			3:15
5.	"Show Off"			3:29
Total length:				16:17

== Personnel ==
Credits adapted from Spotify and WOW Presents Plus:

- Violet Chachki – performer, songwriting (all tracks)
- Ashley Gordon – songwriting (all tracks)
- Tomas J. Costanza – songwriting, mixed (all tracks), production (1)
- Tommy Lee – songwriting, production (1)
- Tom Coyne – mastering (1)
