= The Blonde & Pink Albums =

Studio album by Trixie Mattel
- Released: June 24, 2022
- Studio: GoldWave Studios
- Genre: Power pop; pop rock; alternative rock
- Length: 37:46
- Label: Producer Entertainment Group
- Producer: Ashley Levy; Nick Goldston; Tomas Costanza

Trixie Mattel chronology
Full Coverage, Vol. 1 (2021)	The Blonde & Pink Albums (2022)	Looking Good, Feeling Gorgeous (2023)

Singles from The Blonde & Pink Albums
- 1. "Hello Hello" Released: November 12, 2021; 2. "This Town" Released: January 28, 2022; 3. "C'mon Loretta" Released: April 15, 2022; 4. "White Rabbit" Released: August 19, 2022

The Blonde & Pink Albums are a double album and collectively the fourth studio album by American drag queen and singer-songwriter Trixie Mattel, released on June 24, 2022, by Producer Entertainment Group. The album was promoted by the singles "Hello Hello", "This Town", and "C'mon Loretta" prior to release and includes collaborations with Shakey Graves and Michelle Branch.

== Composition ==
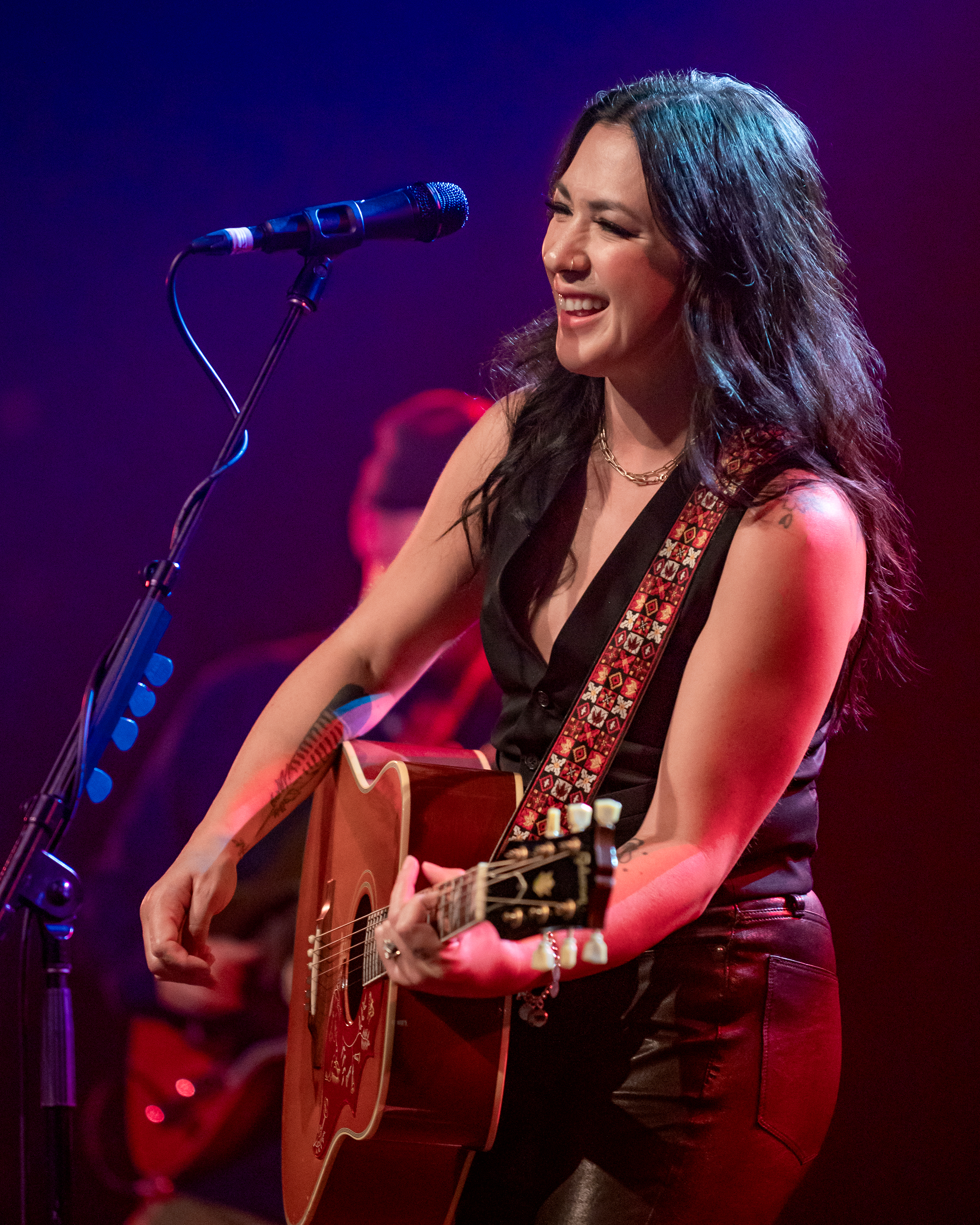
Michelle Branch

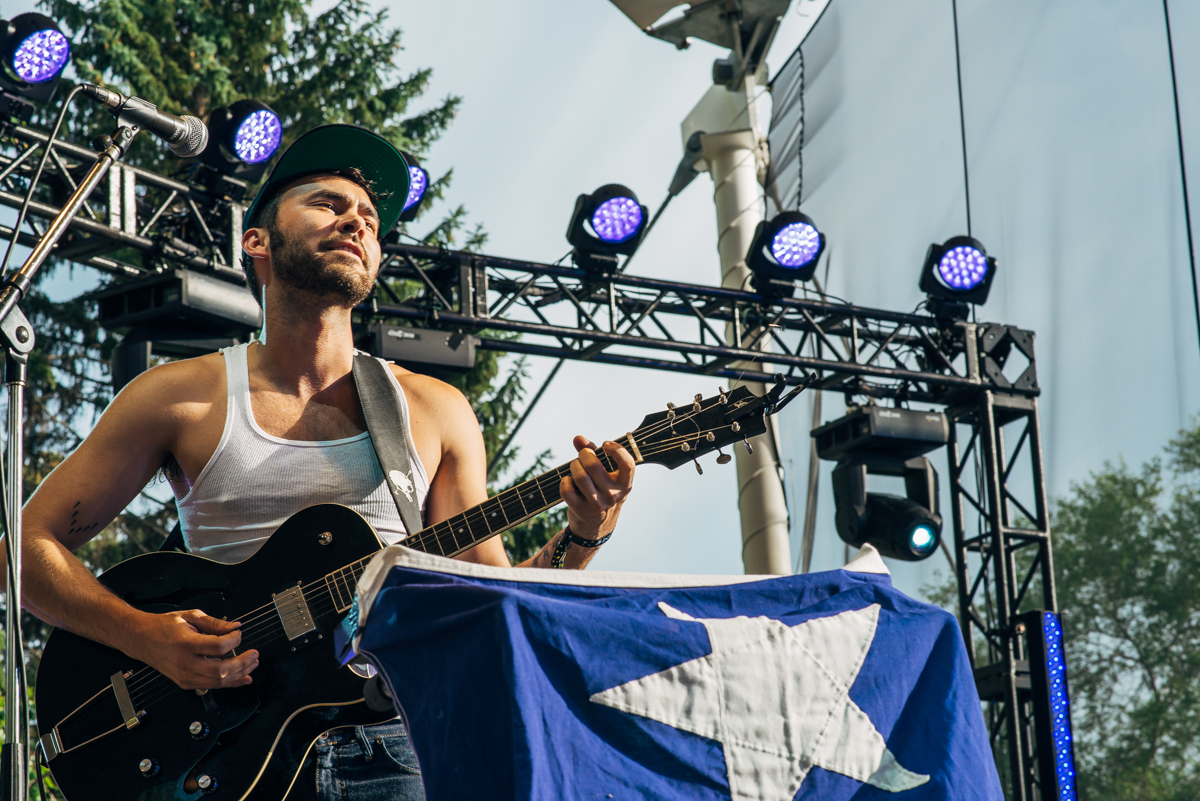
Shakey Graves

The Blonde & Pink Albums primarily consist of power pop, pop rock, and alternative rock songs, a departure from her earlier country and folk style. Many songs evoke new wave bands like Cheap Trick, Blondie, and The Romantics. "Goner" is a "breezy, '90s-meets-'70s acoustic pop anthem" inspired by Sheryl Crow. "Hello Hello" combines surf and garage rock and echoes the "addictive, shout-til-you drop hooks" of The Go-Go's. Texas Monthly described "This Town" as "an aching tribute to the Wisconsin town that made her". The magazine said, "The song is both nostalgic for the simple pleasures of small-town life and a bittersweet reflection on the darker aspects of her hometown: the limited options, alcoholism, and abuse." "C'mon Loretta" was described by MTV upon release as "a sun-soaked, buzzy rock jam similar to Trixie's recent singles", while American Songwriter called it a "mind-melding homage tune" with "an early 2000s rocking feel in the vein of New York rockers The Strokes" and Billboard called the concept "strange" but said the garage rock song was a "slam-dunk for Mattel".

When interviewed by Out Mattel said that the two albums "aren't meant to be starkly different as much as they're meant to be companions. There aren't songs on one that couldn't belong on the other". On the albums including covers of songs by The Go-Go's and Cheap Trick, Mattel said she "had to" cover "Vacation" because she was "obsessed" with the band and sought to reimagine it as "something a little more somber and reflective" after performing it as a ballad on tour; she decided to cover "I Want You to Want Me" on the album because Mattel and her producers had already used the song as a reference point for the production of many of the songs and she was told the song would sound great with her voice.

== Promotion ==
Mattel released "Hello Hello" on November 12, 2021, as the lead single from The Blonde & Pink Albums. The song's music video, directed by Mattel's frequent collaborator Assaad Yacoub with choreography by Laganja Estranja, was released on the same day and went on to win a Queerty Award in the Indie Music Video category. "This Town" featuring Shakey Graves followed as the second single on January 28, 2022 and received a music video directed by Matt Amato. On April 8, 2022, Mattel announced the tracklist of the two sides of the album via social media; a week later on April 15, 2022 "C'mon Loretta", inspired by the story of Loretta Lynn, was released as the album's third single. The music video, released the same day and also directed by Yacoub, takes inspiration from Billie Jean King's 1973 "Battle of the Sexes" tennis victory against Bobby Riggs. "Stay the Night" was featured in the trailer for Mattel's Discovery+ series Trixie Motel, released on May 4, 2022, and was used as the series' opening theme; Mattel said that she wrote the song before the television deal had been struck but believed that a network would purchase the rights to it and wrote "Stay the Night" as the theme song. On May 31, 2022, Mattel performed "This Town" on Jimmy Kimmel Live! with Shakey Graves. On June 6, 2022, Mattel published a video on her YouTube channel announcing the release of a mini merchandise box set in support of the album, featuring items including a lyric book, a press-on nails kit, a tote bag with the album cover printed on it and a "Hello Hello" keychain. A music video for "White Rabbit" was released on August 17, 2022, again directed by Yacoub and featuring Mattel as a "Playboy bunny, a bandleader, and a fashion model", with the song being officially released as the album's fourth single two days later on August 19, 2022.

== Critical reception ==
Professional ratings
Review scores
Source	Rating
AllMusic	4/5 stars

AllMusic contributor Matt Collar wrote, "Part of Mattel's appeal is that while her drag style is often over-the-top high-concept glam, her music is charmingly straightforward and The Blonde & Pink Albums are hooky, sugar-coated pop fun". Olivia McCormack, writing for The Washington Post, pointed out that the double album "highlights her new, sunny style" and that Mattel's music stands out among drag performers for "zeroing in on the importance of lyricism".

== Track listing ==
The Blonde Album track listing
No.	Title	Writer(s)	Producer(s)	Length
1.	"Goner"	Brian Firkus	Nick Goldston	2:36
2.	"Boyfriend"	Ashley Levy; Firkus; Tomas Costanza	Levy; Costanza	2:19
3.	"C'mon Loretta"	Levy; Firkus; Costanza	Levy; Costanza	2:53
4.	"Love You in HiFi"	Levy; Firkus; Costanza	Levy; Costanza	2:24
5.	"Hello Hello"	Levy; Firkus; Costanza	Levy; Costanza	2:36
6.	"I Want You to Want Me"	Rick Nielsen	Constanza	3:38
7.	"New Thing"	Levy; Firkus; Costanza	Levy; Costanza	2:11

The Pink Album track listing
No.	Title	Writer(s)	Producer(s)	Length
1.	"White Rabbit" (featuring Michelle Branch)	Firkus; Goldston	Goldston	2:55
2.	"Stay the Night"	Levy; Firkus; Costanza	Constanza	2:23
3.	"Who Loves You Baby"	Firkus	Constanza	2:46
4.	"Girl of Your Dreams"	Levy; Firkus; Costanza	Constanza	2:35
5.	"Wake Up"	Firkus; Goldston	Goldston	2:44
6.	"This Town" (featuring Shakey Graves)	Firkus	Goldston	2:48
7.	"Vacation"	Charlotte Caffey; Kathy Valentine; Jane Wiedlin	Goldston	2:58
Total length:				37:46

== Personnel ==
- Trixie Mattel – lead vocals
- Michelle Branch – featured vocals
- Tomas Costanza – mixing engineer, mastering engineer
- Nick Goldston – mixing engineer, mastering engineer
- Shakey Graves – featured vocals
- Jon Sams – artwork photography

== Charts ==
Chart performance for The Blonde & Pink Albums
Chart (2022)	Peak position
UK Independent Albums (OCC)	50
US Heatseekers Albums (Billboard)	17
US Top Album Sales (Billboard)	66
