= Red 4 Filth =

Studio album by Alaska Thunderfuck
- Released: September 23, 2022
- Length: 38:37
- Label: Producer Entertainment Group
- Producer: B-Chroma; Skyler Cocco; Tomas Costanza; Ivan and Peter; Jordan Palmer; Chester Krupa; Zach Miller; Jay Stolar; SWAN

Alaska Thunderfuck chronology
Drag: The Musical (Studio Cast Recording) (2022)	Red 4 Filth (2022)

Singles from Red 4 Filth
- 1. "Red" Released: September 10, 2021; 2. "Beautiful (Night 4 a) Breakdown" Released: October 4, 2021; 3. "Without Your Love" Released: October 4, 2021; 4. "Wow" Released: October 29, 2021; 5. "XOXOY2K" Released: November 19, 2021; 6. "Ask Me" Released: November 19, 2021; 7. "22" Released: December 22, 2021; 8. "Uh" Released: January 7, 2022; 9. "I Am Her (She Is Me)" Released: May 6, 2022; 10. "Girlz Night" Released: June 3, 2022

Red 4 Filth is the fourth studio album by American drag queen and recording artist Alaska Thunderfuck, released on September 23, 2022. The album was promoted by ten pre-release singles, "Red", "Beautiful (Night 4 a) Breakdown", "Without Your Love", "Wow", "XOXOY2K", "Ask Me", "22", "Uh", "I Am Her (She Is Me)", and "Girlz Night". The album was supported by her first North American headlining tour in fall 2022. Red 4 Filth takes its name from a fake perfume she created on the fifth season of RuPaul's Drag Race.

== Background and composition ==
The majority of the album was written during COVID-19 lockdowns. In an interview with Thrillist, Alaska said that the album was inspired by the sounds of 1990s and 2000s music, citing Weezer, Aqua, Toni Braxton, and Britney Spears as specific touchpoints. In the music video for "Wow", Alaska performed out of drag with LA-based band the Disciplez as her backing band. "XOXOY2K" is a Europop track with electronic club beats that is inspired by early 2000s nostalgia. "Ask Me" is an Ace of Base-inspired pop song. "22" sees Alaska sing to her younger self and to "any young person who has ever felt like she didn't belong".

== Critical reception ==
Professional ratings
Review scores
Source	Rating
Metro Weekly	2/5 stars

Sean Maunier of Metro Weekly wrote that "as inseparable as camp and comedy are from the Alaska brand, Red 4 Filth feels like it’s trying to be a more straightforward pop record, with some mixed results", and called the Drag Race references featured throughout the album "stale" given that Alaska is "four albums in, and so far removed from her time on the reality series". Maunier concluded that "Alaska managed to make the transition from reality star to recording artist better than most, but having set the bar high for herself, Red 4 Filth can’t help but come up short" and in spite of her "charisma and inimitable attitude", her most recent album lacks "the lightning in a bottle that made Anus work so well".

== Track listing ==
Red 4 Filth track listing
No.	Title	Writer(s)	Producer(s)	Length
1.	"Beautiful (Night 4 a) Breakdown"	Chester Krupa; Ferras; Jesse Saint John; Jordan Palmer; Justin Honard; Nick Laughlin; Jay Stolar	Ivan and Peter; Krupa; Stolar	3:32
2.	"All That She Wants"	Jenny Berggren; Jonas Berggren; Linn Berggren; Ulf Ekberg	Tomas Costanza	3:26
3.	"XOXOY2K"	Stolar; JBach; Saint John; Palmer; Honard; Laughlin	Ivan and Peter; Palmer; Krupa; Stolar	2:54
4.	"Red"	Andrew Rosario; Krupa; Stolar; JBach; Palmer; Honard; Skyler Cocco	Ivan and Peter; Palmer; Krupa; Cocco; Stolar	2:56
5.	"Ask Me"	Ferras; JBach; Saint John; Palmer; Honard; Laughlin; Stolar	Ivan and Peter; Palmer; Stolar	2:32
6.	"Wow"	Stolar; JBach; Honard; Krupa	Ivan and Peter; Palmer; Krupa; Stolar	2:40
7.	"Uh"	Rosario; Palmer; Honard; Stoler; Zach Miller	Ivan and Peter; Stolar; Miller	2:49
8.	"Without Your Love"	B-Chroma; Krupa; Ferras; Stolar; JBach; Palmer; Honard; SWAN	Ivan and Peter; B-Chroma; Krupa; Palmer; Stolar; SWAN	3:01
9.	"22"	Rosario; Palmer; Honard; Stolar; Miller	Ivan and Peter; Stolar; Miller	3:45
10.	"Girlz Night" (featuring Stephanie's Child)	Honard; Stolar; JBach; Jon Buscema; Laughlin	Ivan and Peter; Stolar	2:30
11.	"I Am Her (She Is Me)" (featuring Ts Madison)	Rocco Giovannoni; Laughlin; SWAN; Vanegas; Palmer; Saint John; Stolar; Ferras; Rosario; Ts Madison	Ivan and Peter; Stolar; Palmer; B-Chroma	2:43
12.	"More Than Enough (2 Me)"	Honard; Palmer; Saint John; JBach; Stolar; Krupa	Palmer; Stolar; Ivan and Peter; Krupa	3:00
13.	"Mmm Mmm Mmm"	Noah Longworth McGuire; Nathan Irving Flaks; Honard; JBach; Stolar; Krupa; Rosario	McGuire; Flaks; Stolar; Ivan and Peter; Krupa	2:49
Total length:				38:37
