= Making the Grade =

Making the Grade may refer to:

- Making the Grade (1929 film), an American comedy film
- Making the Grade (TV series), a 1982 American television series
- Making the Grade (1984 film), an American teen comedy film
- "Making the Grade!", a 1989 episode of The Raccoons
- Making the Grade (album), a 2002 album by Diffuser
- "Making the Grade", a 2006 episode of My Gym Partner's a Monkey
- "Making the Grade", a season 2 episode of The Loud House
- Making the Grade: The Economic Evolution of American School Districts
