= Drag: The Musical =

Off-broadway musical about drag arts

- Off-Broadway promotional poster
- Music: Tomas Costanza; Justin Andrew Honard; Ash Gordon
- Lyrics: Tomas Costanza; Justin Andrew Honard; Ash Gordon
- Book: Tomas Costanza; Justin Andrew Honard; Ash Gordon
- Premiere: 23 September 2022: The Bourbon Room, Los Angeles
- Productions: 2022 Los Angeles; 2024 Off-Broadway
- Awards: 2024 Queerty Award for Live Theater

Drag: The Musical is an Off-Broadway musical with music, lyrics and book by Tomas Costanza, Ash Gordon, and winner of RuPaul's Drag Race All Stars season 2 Alaska Thunderfuck.

== Background ==
Drag: The Musical was originally released as a concept album written by Alaska Thunderfuck, Tomas Costanza, and Ash Gordon. In May 2022, Drag: The Musical (Studio Cast Recording) was released, and featured Alaska Thunderfuck, Bob the Drag Queen, Divina de Campo, Ginger Minj, Jujubee, Lagoona Bloo, Peppermint, Monét X Change, Margaret Cho, Fortune Feimster, Michelle Visage, Max von Essen, and Nick Adams.

== Productions ==
=== Los Angeles (2022–2024) ===
A workshop version of the show was held in June 2022. The first official run started at the Bourbon Room on Hollywood Boulevard in September 2022, concluding the following month. In March 2024, they returned for a two-week run.

=== Off-Broadway (2024–2025) ===
On October 21, 2024, Drag: The Musical debuted Off-Broadway at the New World Stages. Liza Minnelli was announced as a producer ahead of the premiere, and was featured in an audio prologue. While the show generally received positive reviews from the critics, TheWrap and New York Theater Guide noted that the ending was unsatisfying, and that the show could trim the fluff. They ended the run on April 27, 2025.

== Casts ==
Character	Los Angeles 2022	Off-Broadway 2024		
Kitty Galloway	Alaska Thunderfuck	Alaska Thunderfuck	Alaska Thunderfuck	Jimbo
Alexis Gillmore	Nick Adams	Nick Adams	Nick Adams	Nick Adams
Tom Hutchinson	Joey McIntyre	Joey McIntyre	Joey McIntyre	Adam Pascal
Drunk Jerry	Jamie Torcellini	Eddie Korbich	Eddie Korbich	Eddie Korbich
Gloria Schmidt	J. Elaine Marcos	J. Elaine Marcos	J. Elaine Marcos	J. Elaine Marcos
Rita LaRitz	J. Elaine Marcos	J. Elaine Marcos	J. Elaine Marcos	J. Elaine Marcos
Savannah St. James	Jan Sport	Jan Sport	Jan Sport	Jan Sport
The Tigress	Jujubee	Jujubee	Jujubee	Jujubee
Tuna Turner	Lagoona Bloo	Lagoona Bloo	Lagoona Bloo	Lagoona Bloo
Dixie Coxworth	Alysha Deslorieux	Britney Campbell	Bre Jackson	Liisi LaFontaine
Popcorn	Jackie Cox	Manila Luzon	Luxx Noir London	Luxx Noir London
Puss Puss DuBois	Nick Laughlin	Nick Laughlin	Nick Laughlin	Nick Laughlin
Brendan Hutchinson	Kayden Koshelev	Remi Tuckman & Yair Keydar	Remi Tuckman & Yair Keydar	Remi Tuckman & Yair Keydar
Swings	—N/a	Kodiak Thompson, Cameron Mitchell Bell, Adrian Villegas	Kodiak Thompson, Cameron Mitchell Bell, Adrian Villegas	Kodiak Thompson, Cameron Mitchell Bell, Adrian Villegas
Ensemble	—N/a	Teddy Wilson Jr, Christine Shepard, Kodiak Thompson, Nicholas Kraft, Peli Woods		

=== Notable replacements ===
- Gloria Schmidt: Lisa Helmi Johanson
- Dixie Coxworth: Tamika Lawrence
- Brendan Hutchinson: Beau Coddou and Dylan Patterson

== Studio cast recording (2022) ==
DRAG: The Musical (Studio Cast Recording)

Studio album by Alaska Thunderfuck and the original studio cast of Drag: The Musical
- Released: May 13, 2022
- Length: 63:32
- Label: PEG; Killingsworth; Craft; Concord Theatricals
- Producer: Tomas Costanza

Alaska Thunderfuck and the original studio cast of Drag: The Musical chronology
Vagina (2019)	DRAG: The Musical (Studio Cast Recording) (2022)	Red 4 Filth (2022)

Singles from Drag: The Musical
- 1. "Drag Is Expensive" Released: May 5, 2022

Drag: The Musical (Studio Cast Recording) is a concept album written by Alaska Thunderfuck, Ash Gordon, and Tomas Costanza, and is the source material for Drag: The Musical. It was released on May 13, 2022, by PEG Records, Killingsworth Recording Company, Craft Recordings, and Concord Theatricals. The album features a large ensemble cast including Alaska Thunderfuck, Bob the Drag Queen, Divina de Campo, Ginger Minj, Jujubee, Lagoona Bloo, Peppermint, Monét X Change, Margaret Cho, Fortune Feimster, Michelle Visage, Max von Essen, and Nick Adams. "Drag Is Expensive" was released as a single on May 5, 2022.

=== Track listing ===
All tracks are written by Alaska Thunderfuck, Ash Gordon, and Tomas Costanza.

Drag: The Musical (Studio Cast Recording)
No.	Title	Performer(s)	Length
1.	"Welcome to the Fishtank"	Bob the Drag Queen; Divina de Campo; Lagoona Bloo; Michelle Visage; Monét X Change; Nick Adams	4:02
2.	"She's All That"	Adams	2:09
3.	"Cathouse Fever"	Ginger Minj; Jujubee; Peppermint	2:57
4.	"Queen Kitty"	Alaska Thunderfuck; De Campo; Minj; Bloo	2:49
5.	"The Accounting Song"	Max von Essen	2:44
6.	"Drag Is Expensive"	De Campo; Bloo; Von Essen; X Change; Adams	3:56
7.	"Wigs"	Minj; Jujubee; Peppermint	1:52
8.	"Gay as Hell"	Jamie Torcellini	1:31
9.	"Gloria Schmidt"	Fortune Feimster; Von Essen; Visage	1:52
10.	"Out of Your League"	Thunderfuck	2:41
11.	"Miriam Mintz"	Margaret Cho; Thunderfuck	1:00
12.	"She's Such a Bitch"	Thunderfuck; De Campo; Minj; Jujubee; Bloo; X Change; Adams; Peppermint	5:50
13.	"It's So Pretty"	Adams; Jack Rodman	2:45
14.	"I'm Just Brendan"	Rodman	1:58
15.	"We Need Money"	De Campo; Bloo; Von Essen; Visage; X Change; Adams	2:33
16.	"I Don't Like You But I Like You"	Visage; Von Essen	3:11
17.	"Girls Like Us"	Peppermint	2:51
18.	"Jerry's Dead"	De Campo; Rodman; Bloo; Von Essen; Visage; Nick Adams	2:22
19.	"Two Bitches are Better Than One"	Thunderfuck; Adams	3:02
20.	"Real Queens"	X Change; Thunderfuck	2:14
21.	"Welcome to the Catfish"	Bob the Drag Queen; De Campo; Minj; Jujubee; Bloo; Peppermint	3:28
22.	"Brendan Is His Name"	Rodman; Jujubee; De Campo; Peppermint; Bloo; Minj	2:20
23.	"Get It Together"	Thunderfuck; De Campo; Minj; Rodman; Jujubee; Bloo; Visage; X Change; Adams; Peppermint	3:25
Total length:			63:32

== Awards and nominations ==
=== Los Angeles production ===
Year	Award	Category	Result
2023	Queerty Awards	Live Theater	Won

=== New York production ===
Year	Award	Category	Nominee	Result
2025	Queerty Awards	Live Theater		Won
2025	GLAAD Media Awards	Special Recognition		Won
2025	Lucille Lortel Awards	Outstanding Musical		Nominated
2025	Lucille Lortel Awards	Outstanding Choreographer	Spencer Liff	Nominated
2025	Lucille Lortel Awards	Outstanding Lead Performer in a Musical	Alaska Thunderfuck	Nominated
2025	Lucille Lortel Awards	Outstanding Featured Performer in a Musical	Jujubee	Nominated
2025	Lucille Lortel Awards	Outstanding Featured Performer in a Musical	Eddie Korbich	Nominated
2025	Lucille Lortel Awards	Outstanding Costume Design	Marco Marco	Nominated
2025	Drama League Awards	Outstanding Production of a Musical		Nominated
2025	Drama League Awards	Distinguished Performance	Alaska Thunderfuck	Nominated
2025	Outer Critics Circle Awards	Outstanding New Off-Broadway Musical		Won
2025	Outer Critics Circle Awards	Outstanding Lead Performer in an Off-Broadway Musical	Nick Adams	Won
2025	Outer Critics Circle Awards	Outstanding Lead Performer in an Off-Broadway Musical	Alaska Thunderfuck	Nominated
2025	Outer Critics Circle Awards	Outstanding Featured Performer in an Off-Broadway Musical	Eddie Korbich	Nominated
2025	Outer Critics Circle Awards	Outstanding Featured Performer in an Off-Broadway Musical	J. Elaine Marcos	Nominated
2025	Dorian Award	Outstanding LGBTQ Off-Broadway Production		Nominated
2025	Dorian Award	Outstanding Lead Performance in an Off-Broadway Production	Alaska Thunderfuck	Nominated
2025	Dorian Award	Outstanding Lead Performance in an Off-Broadway Production	Jujubee	Nominated
