= Vampire Fitness =

2020 EP by Katya

EP by Katya
- Released: November 13, 2020
- Genre: Electro-industrial; progressive electronic
- Length: 17:54
- Language: English; Portuguese; Russian; Italian
- Label: Producer Entertainment Group
- Producer: Tomas Costanza

Katya chronology
| Vampire Fitness (2020) | Vampire Fitness (Remixed) (2021) |

Singles from Vampire Fitness
- 1. "Come in Brazil" Released: November 6, 2020

Vampire Fitness is the debut extended play by American drag performer Katya Zamolodchikova (known mononymously as Katya), released by Producer Entertainment Group on November 13, 2020. The EP features guest appearances by fellow RuPaul's Drag Race contestants Alaska Thunderfuck and Trixie Mattel.

== Composition ==
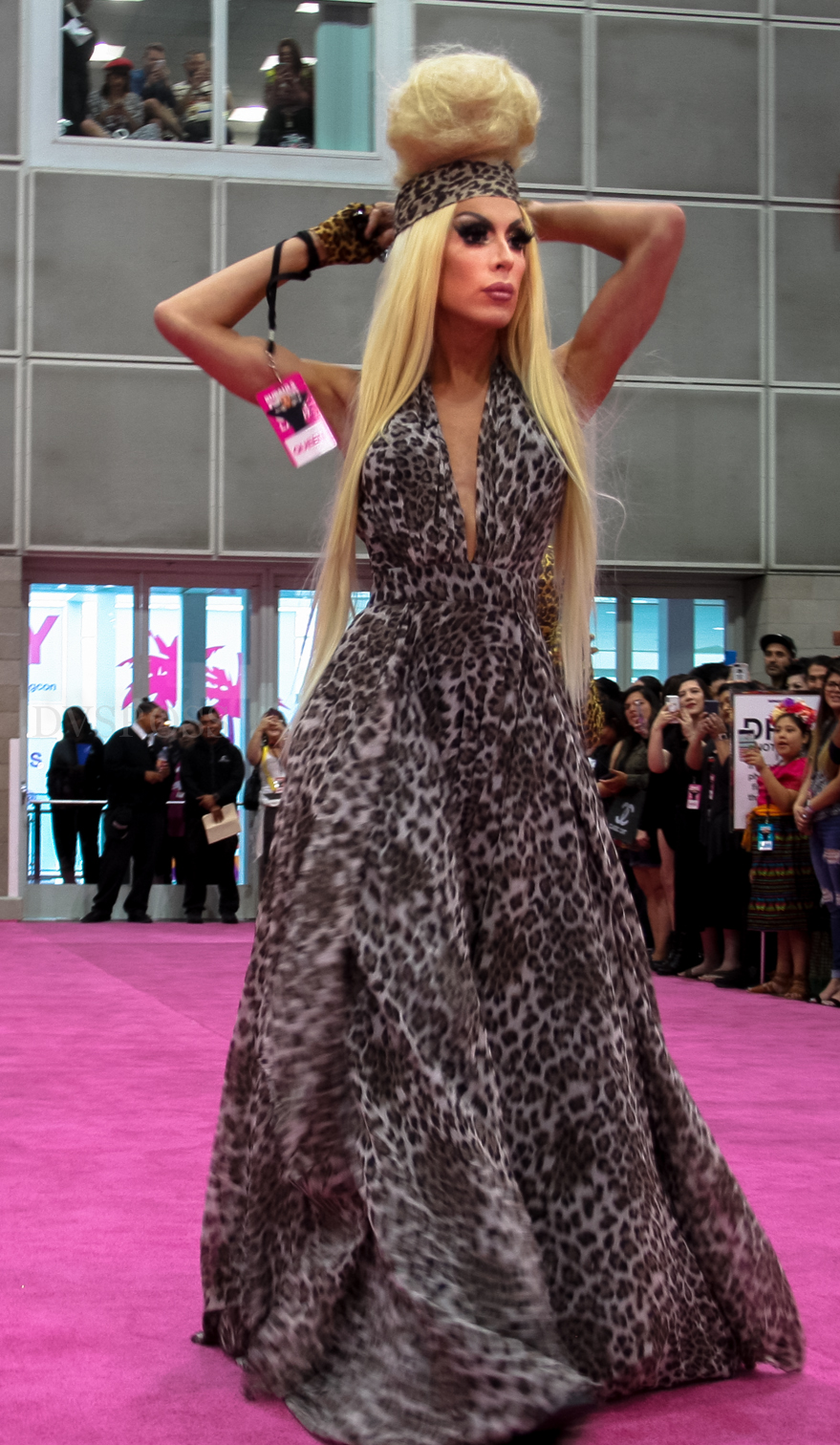
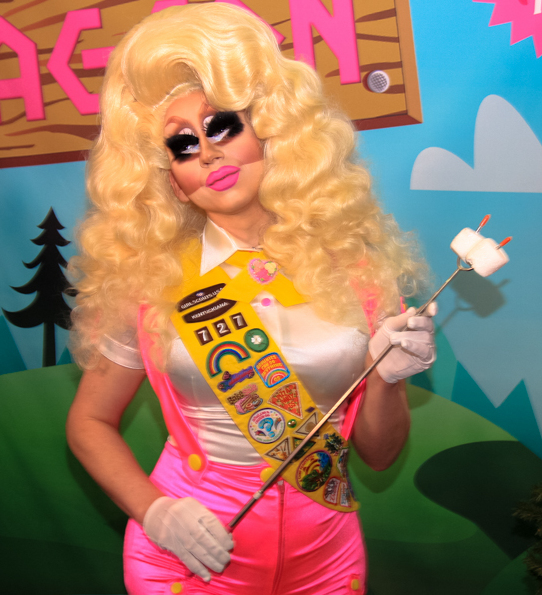
Vampire Fitness features guest appearances by fellow RuPaul's Drag Race contestants Alaska Thunderfuck (left) and Trixie Mattel (right).

The EP has five tracks, which Katya has described as "a dark and brooding international musical boat ride through the brain and mouth of famous cross-dresser". The overall sound of the EP is designed to resemble "the soundtrack to a late-night gym for vampires".

"Come in Brazil", which features fellow RuPaul's Drag Race contestant Alaska Thunderfuck, has been described as a "divine intercontinental expression of lust as the pair crafts a lush soundscape inspired by incessant fan pleas for drag queens to perform in the song's titular South American nation". The song is about anilingus and has a Portuguese chorus. Katya has said of the song, "These are things I learned not through reading books or watching television programs, but through people screaming them at me all the time."

Katya has described "ГЛАЗ" as "a very experimental song" and said, "At one point we recorded me having an orgasm and then shrieking as I was being violently murdered. Then we were like, 'What if an alien chipmunk were to go through that thing?' It's just fun. But it's a real groovy beat."

"Ding Dong!" features Drag Race alumnae and frequent collaborator Trixie Mattel. Katya has described the song as a "bar mitzvah barn-burner" and said Trixie Mattel was "really cooperative" during the songwriting process. The song was influenced by Eurodance and Svetlana Loboda's song "Boom Boom", and references Jame Gumb, the real name of the fictional character Buffalo Bill in Thomas Harris' novel The Silence of the Lambs (1988).

"Ravioli" is about the pasta of the same name and has been described as "a milestone for fluid representation as it touches on five different variations of the bodily liquid, ranging from that of humans to dogs, cats, and even rodents". Katya has said the body fluids are mentioned "mostly for the purposes of rhyming in the songwriting".

The spoken word track "Be Your Own Dentist" has Katya offer advice for removing one's own teeth in "linguistic construction that's not really a song, but not really full slam poetry, either". She has said of the piece:

I love those guided meditations, but I always find them to be a little bit boring. So, spice it up! What if we just, you know, take out your own teeth... I thought it would be funny if kids with good manual dexterity could get some pliers, they stumble upon the track on their headphones, and push comes to shove, and little Susie Q's got no teeth!

== Release and promotion ==
The EP was released digitally on November 13, 2020, preceded by the release of the lead single "Come in Brazil" on November 6. Following Katya's announcement of the EP, Trixie Mattel tweeted, "Can I just say I have heard this whole thing and none of you have any way of preparing yourselves for the sounds featured on this lively EP." A music video for "Ding Dong!" featuring Trixie Mattel was released on November 20. A music video for "Come in Brazil" featuring Alaska Thunderfuck followed on December 18.

== Reception ==
Entertainment Weekly's Joey Nolfi called the EP a "musical experiment" and a "digital distortion of European dance, sex, orgasmic wailing, the sounds of murder, spoken sermons about self-administered dentistry, and, of course, Italian cuisine, all tied together as a 'multi-pronged, many-tiered assault' on listeners with 'consonant clusters' found in Russian pop songs". He called "Ding Dong!" "a stark genre departure from Mattel's typical brand of folk-rock realness". Christopher Rudolph of Logo TV's NewNowNext said the EP sees Katya giving "serious Nosferatu vibes".

== Track listing ==
All tracks are written by Ashley Levy and Paul Coultrup. All tracks are produced by Tomas Costanza.

| No. | Title | Length |
|---|---|---|
| 1. | "Come in Brazil" (featuring Alaska Thunderfuck) | 3:06 |
| 2. | "ГЛАЗ" | 2:42 |
| 3. | "Ding Dong!" (featuring Trixie Mattel) | 2:50 |
| 4. | "Ravioli" | 2:23 |
| 5. | "Be Your Own Dentist" | 6:53 |
| Total length: | | 17:54 |

== Remix EP ==
Vampire Fitness (Remixed)

EP (remix) by Katya
- Released: April 23, 2021
- Length: 12:10
- Language: Russian; Italian; English
- Label: Producer Entertainment Group

Katya chronology
| Vampire Fitness (2020) | Vampire Fitness (Remixed) (2021) |

Singles from Vampire Fitness (Remixed)
- 1. "Ding Dong! (Vigiletti Remix)" Released: April 16, 2021

On April 23, 2021, PEG Records released a four-track remix EP entitled Vampire Fitness (Remixed), consisting of remixes of Vampire Fitness songs "Ding Dong!" and "Ravioli". The Vigiletti remix of "Ding Dong!" featuring Trixie Mattel was released as the EP's lead single a week earlier on April 16, 2021.

=== Track listing ===
| No. | Title | Remixer | Length |
|---|---|---|---|
| 1. | "Ding Dong!" (featuring Trixie Mattel) (Vigiletti remix) | Vigiletti | 2:56 |
| 2. | "Ding Dong!" (featuring Trixie Mattel) (Markaholic remix) | Markaholic | 2:49 |
| 3. | "Ravioli" (featuring M¥SS KETA) (Tortellini remix) | M¥SS KETA | 2:26 |
| 4. | "Ravioli" (Delizioso remix) | Bright Light Bright Light | 3:58 |
| Total length: | | | 12:10 |
