= Ash Gordon =

American singer-songwriter

- Born: Ashley Levy
- Origin: Long Island, NY
- Genres: Pop
- Occupation: Singer · songwriter
- Years active: 2020–present
- Label: Pulse Music Group

Ashley Gordon (née Levy), known professionally as Ash Gordon, is an American singer-songwriter. She is signed to Pulse Music Group. She is best known for her work with RuPaul's Drag Race contestants Trixie Mattel & Katya, and for co-writing Drag: The Musical with Alaska Thunderfuck.

== Career ==
=== Songwriting ===
In June 2022, Gordon released her single "Everyone Is A Little Bit Gay" featuring Alaska Thunderfuck. Wonderland described the song as "...an ode to expressing your sexuality as you desire".

In May 2023, Gordon co-wrote the titular single for the Drag Isn't Dangerous digital fundraiser with Drew Louis and Ocean Kelly.

=== Drag: The Musical ===
Gordon co-wrote Drag: The Musical with Tomas Costanza and Alaska Thunderfuck, which was released as a concept album Drag: The Musical (Studio Cast Recording) on May 13, 2022. That following September, it was turned into a stage production at The Bourbon Room in Hollywood, California. Gordon told Playbill that the song "I'm Just Brendan" was "...one of the most important songs in the musical. Knowing that, we rewrote it about 22 times". Drag: The Musical premiered Off-Broadway in October 2024 at the New World Stages

== Discography ==
=== Songwriting and production credits ===
Year	Title	Artist(s)	Album	Writer(s)	Producer(s)
2024	“All Hallows’ Eve”	Boulet Brothers	Non-album singles	Ashley Gordon, Dracmorda Boulet, Swanthula Boulet, Tomas Costanza, Tyler Connaghan	Tomas Costanza, Ashley Gordon
2024	"Enough"	Sapphira Cristál	Non-album singles	Ash Gordon, James Blaszko, O'Neill Haynes, Ocean Kelly	Ocean Kelly
2024	"Miss Jesus Christ"	Trinity the Tuck	Sinematic	Ash Gordon, Drew Louis, Jayelle	Drew Louis
2024	"Long Time Coming"	New Kids on the Block	Still Kids	Ash Gordon, Joey McIntyre, Sean Thomas	Ash Gordon, Sean Thomas
2023	"Toys (Spanglish Version)"	Lagoona Bloo	Underwater Bubble Pop	Ash Gordon, David Brumfield, Jarina De Marco, Lagoona Bloo, Paul Coultrup, Tomas Costanza	Tomas Costanza, Paul Coultrup
2023	"Toys"	Lagoona Bloo	Underwater Bubble Pop	Ash Gordon, David Brumfield, Lagoona Bloo, Paul Coultrup, Tomas Costanza	Tomas Costanza, Paul Coultrup
2023	"Gods of Death"	Boulet Brothers	The Boulet Brothers' Dragula Season 5 Soundtrack	Ash Gordon, Tomas Costanza, Dracmorda Boulet, Swanthula Boulet, Paul Coultrup	Tomas Costanza
2023	"Spit"	Brude	Non-album singles	Ash Gordon, Matt Trivigno	Matt Trivigno
2023	"Drag Isn't Dangerous"	Jayelle, Ocean Kelly	Non-album singles	Ash Gordon, Drew Louis, Ocean Kelly	Drew Louis
2022	"Come Alive"	Little Glee Monster	Journey	Ash Gordon, Mags Duval, 星野純一	No producer credited
2022	"Ascension"	Boulet Brothers	Non-album single	Ash Gordon, Tomas Costanza, Dracmorda Boulet, Swanthula Boulet, Paul Coultrup	Tomas Costanza
2022	"She Nasty" (featuring Yvie Oddly)	Trinity the Tuck	Ego	Ash Gordon, Jovan Bridges, Paul Coultrup, Ryan Taylor, Tomas Costanza	Tomas Costanza
2022	"Femboys" (featuring Jan Sport)	Trinity the Tuck	Ego	Ash Gordon, Paul Coultrup, Ryan Taylor, Tomas Costanza	Tomas Costanza
2022	"Twirl (Toni Ni Remix)"	Trinity the Tuck	Ego	Ash Gordon, Paul Coultrup, Ryan Taylor, Tomas Costanza	Tomas Costanza
2022	"Run It" (featuring Shontelle Sparkles)	Trinity the Tuck	Ego	Ash Gordon, Paul Coultrup, Toby Marlow, Ryan Taylor, Tomas Costanza	Tomas Costanza
2022	"Sexology"	Trinity the Tuck	Ego	Ash Gordon, Paul Coultrup, Ryan Taylor, Tomas Costanza	Tomas Costanza
2022	"Ego (Megamix)"	Trinity the Tuck	Ego	Ash Gordon, Paul Coultrup, Ryan Taylor, Tomas Costanza	Tomas Costanza
2022	"Sexology (Bright Light Bright Light Remix)"	Trinity the Tuck	Ego	Ash Gordon, Paul Coultrup, Ryan Taylor, Tomas Costanza	Tomas Costanza
2022	"Twirl"	Trinity the Tuck	Ego	Ash Gordon, Paul Coultrup, Ryan Taylor, Tomas Costanza	Tomas Costanza
2022	"Come Get It" (featuring Monét X Change)	Trinity the Tuck	Ego	Ash Gordon, Kevin Bertin, Paul Coultrup, Ryan Taylor, Tomas Costanza	Tomas Costanza
2022	"Southern Hospitality"	Trinity the Tuck	Ego	Ash Gordon, Paul Coultrup, Ryan Taylor, Tomas Costanza	Tomas Costanza
2022	"She Nasty"	Trinity the Tuck	Ego	Ash Gordon, Paul Coultrup, Ryan Taylor, Tomas Costanza	Tomas Costanza
2022	"Flamin' Hot"	Sharon Needles	Absolute Zero	Ash Gordon, Paul Coultrup, Aaron Coady, Tomas Costanza	Tomas Costanza
2022	"Boogie Man"	Sharon Needles	Absolute Zero	Ash Gordon, Paul Coultrup, Aaron Coady, Tomas Costanza	Tomas Costanza
2022	"Fruit Fly"	Sharon Needles	Absolute Zero	Ash Gordon, Paul Coultrup, Aaron Coady, Tomas Costanza	Tomas Costanza
2022	"I Love You"	Sharon Needles	Absolute Zero	Ash Gordon, Paul Coultrup, Aaron Coady, Tomas Costanza	Tomas Costanza
2022	"Size Queen"	Sharon Needles	Absolute Zero	Ash Gordon, Paul Coultrup, Aaron Coady, Tomas Costanza	Tomas Costanza
2022	"Absolute Zero"	Sharon Needles	Absolute Zero	Ash Gordon, Paul Coultrup, Aaron Coady, Tomas Costanza	Tomas Costanza
2022	"This And That"	The Blah Blah Blahs	Non-album single	Ashley Gordon, Jarina De Marco, Tomas Costanza, Xander Rushie	Tomas Costanza
2022	"Boyfriend"	Trixie Mattel	The Blonde & Pink Albums	Ash Gordon, Brian Firkus, Tomas Costanza	Ash Gordon, Tomas Costanza
2022	"C'mon Loretta"	Trixie Mattel	The Blonde & Pink Albums	Ash Gordon, Brian Firkus, Tomas Costanza	Ash Gordon, Tomas Costanza
2022	"Love You in HiFi"	Trixie Mattel	The Blonde & Pink Albums	Ash Gordon, Brian Firkus, Tomas Costanza	Ash Gordon, Tomas Costanza
2022	"Stay The Night"	Trixie Mattel	The Blonde & Pink Albums	Ash Gordon, Brian Firkus, Tomas Costanza	Ash Gordon, Tomas Costanza
2022	"Hello Hello"	Trixie Mattel	The Blonde & Pink Albums	Ash Gordon, Brian Firkus, Tomas Costanza	Ash Gordon, Tomas Costanza
2022	"Girl Of Your Dreams"	Trixie Mattel	The Blonde & Pink Albums	Ash Gordon, Brian Firkus, Tomas Costanza	Ash Gordon, Tomas Costanza
2022	"New Thing"	Trixie Mattel	The Blonde & Pink Albums	Ash Gordon, Brian Firkus, Tomas Costanza	Ash Gordon, Tomas Costanza
2022	"Miriam Mintz"	Drag: The Musical Studio Cast	Drag: The Musical (Studio Cast Recording)	Justin Honard, Ash Gordon, Tomas Costanza	Tomas Costanza
2022	"Wigs"	Drag: The Musical Studio Cast	Drag: The Musical (Studio Cast Recording)	Justin Honard, Ash Gordon, Tomas Costanza	Tomas Costanza
2022	"Cathouse Fever"	Drag: The Musical Studio Cast	Drag: The Musical (Studio Cast Recording)	Justin Honard, Ash Gordon, Tomas Costanza	Tomas Costanza
2022	"Out Of Your League"	Drag: The Musical Studio Cast	Drag: The Musical (Studio Cast Recording)	Justin Honard, Ash Gordon, Tomas Costanza	Tomas Costanza
2022	"We Need Money"	Drag: The Musical Studio Cast	Drag: The Musical (Studio Cast Recording)	Justin Honard, Ash Gordon, Tomas Costanza	Tomas Costanza
2022	Jerry's Dead"	Drag: The Musical Studio Cast	Drag: The Musical (Studio Cast Recording)	Justin Honard, Ash Gordon, Tomas Costanza	Tomas Costanza
2022	"I'm Just Brendan"	Drag: The Musical Studio Cast	Drag: The Musical (Studio Cast Recording)	Justin Honard, Ash Gordon, Tomas Costanza	Tomas Costanza
2022	"Welcome To The Fishtank"	Drag: The Musical Studio Cast	Drag: The Musical (Studio Cast Recording)	Justin Honard, Ash Gordon, Tomas Costanza	Tomas Costanza
2022	"Brendan Is His Name"	Drag: The Musical Studio Cast	Drag: The Musical (Studio Cast Recording)	Justin Honard, Ash Gordon, Tomas Costanza	Tomas Costanza
2022	"Drag Is Expensive"	Drag: The Musical Studio Cast	Drag: The Musical (Studio Cast Recording)	Justin Honard, Ash Gordon, Tomas Costanza	Tomas Costanza
2022	"The Accounting Song"	Drag: The Musical Studio Cast	Drag: The Musical (Studio Cast Recording)	Justin Honard, Ash Gordon, Tomas Costanza	Tomas Costanza
2022	"She's Such A Bitch"	Drag: The Musical Studio Cast	Drag: The Musical (Studio Cast Recording)	Justin Honard, Ash Gordon, Tomas Costanza	Tomas Costanza
2022	"She's All That"	Drag: The Musical Studio Cast	Drag: The Musical (Studio Cast Recording)	Justin Honard, Ash Gordon, Tomas Costanza	Tomas Costanza
2022	"Two Bitches Are Better Than One"	Drag: The Musical Studio Cast	Drag: The Musical (Studio Cast Recording)	Justin Honard, Ash Gordon, Tomas Costanza	Tomas Costanza
2022	"Gay As Hell"	Drag: The Musical Studio Cast	Drag: The Musical (Studio Cast Recording)	Justin Honard, Ash Gordon, Tomas Costanza	Tomas Costanza
2022	"I Don't Like You But I Like You"	Drag: The Musical Studio Cast	Drag: The Musical (Studio Cast Recording)	Justin Honard, Ash Gordon, Tomas Costanza	Tomas Costanza
2022	"Get It Together"	Drag: The Musical Studio Cast	Drag: The Musical (Studio Cast Recording)	Justin Honard, Ash Gordon, Tomas Costanza	Tomas Costanza
2022	"Welcome To The Catfish"	Drag: The Musical Studio Cast	Drag: The Musical (Studio Cast Recording)	Justin Honard, Ash Gordon, Tomas Costanza	Tomas Costanza
2022	"Real Queens"	Drag: The Musical Studio Cast	Drag: The Musical (Studio Cast Recording)	Justin Honard, Ash Gordon, Tomas Costanza	Tomas Costanza
2022	"Queen Kitty"	Drag: The Musical Studio Cast	Drag: The Musical (Studio Cast Recording)	Justin Honard, Ash Gordon, Tomas Costanza	Tomas Costanza
2022	"Gloria Schmidt"	Drag: The Musical Studio Cast	Drag: The Musical (Studio Cast Recording)	Justin Honard, Ash Gordon, Tomas Costanza	Tomas Costanza
2022	"It's So Pretty"	Drag: The Musical Studio Cast	Drag: The Musical (Studio Cast Recording)	Justin Honard, Ash Gordon, Tomas Costanza	Tomas Costanza
2022	"Girls Like Us"	Drag: The Musical Studio Cast	Drag: The Musical (Studio Cast Recording)	Justin Honard, Ash Gordon, Tomas Costanza	Tomas Costanza
2020	"Ding Dong!" (featuring Trixie Mattel)	Katya	Vampire Fitness	Ash Gordon, Paul Coultrup	Tomas Costanza
2020	"Come in Brazil" (featuring Alaska Thunderfuck)	Katya	Vampire Fitness	Ash Gordon, Paul Coultrup	Tomas Costanza
2017	"Battle Axe"	Sharon Needles	Battle Axe	Ash Gordon, Aaron Coady	Tomas Costanza
2017	"Cocaine & Fuck"	Sharon Needles	Battle Axe	Ash Gordon, Aaron Coady	Tomas Costanza
2015	"Your Makeup Is Terrible"	Alaska Thunderfuck	Anus	Ash Gordon, Justin Honard, Jeremy Mark Mikush, Tomas Costanza	Tomas Costanza, Paul Coultrup
2015	"Nails" (featuring Jeremy Mark Mikush)	Alaska Thunderfuck	Anus	Ash Gordon, Justin Honard, Jeremy Mark Mikush, Tomas Costanza	Tomas Costanza, Paul Coultrup
2015	"This Is My Hair"	Alaska Thunderfuck	Anus	Ash Gordon, Justin Honard, Tomas Costanza	Tomas Costanza, Paul Coultrup
2013	"This Club Is a Haunted House (featuring RuPaul)	Sharon Needles, RuPaul	PG-13	Ash Gordon	No producer credited

=== Studio albums ===
Title	Details
Ash Gordon II	Released: July 15, 2022; Label: Self-released; Formats: Digital download, streaming; Track listing: 1. "Everyone Is A Little Bit Gay" (featuring Alaska Thunderfuck); 2. "WIN/WIN"; 3. "Viva Electric" (featuring Bob the Drag Queen); 4. "Chicka Boom Boom; 5. "Hit Different"; 6. "All I See Is Gold" (featuring Bonavega); 7. "Connection"; 8. "I Want It"
Ash Gordon	Released: July 15, 2022; Label: Self-released; Formats: Digital download, streaming; Track listing: 1. "Alright Alright Alright"; 2. "Good On Ya"; 3. "I Wanna Be A DJ"; 4. "Cosmic Colors" (featuring Trixie Mattel); 5. "Nice Personality"; 6. "Feel Like This"; 7. "YES"; 8. "Come and Get It" (featuring Earl St. Clair)

==== Singles ====
Title	Year	Writer(s)	Producer(s)
"What a Wonderful World"	2024	Bob Thiele, George David Weiss	No producer credited
"Everyone Is A Little Bit Gay" (featuring Alaska Thunderfuck)	2022	Ash Gordon, Justin Honard, Paul Coultrup, Tomas Costanza	Tomas Costanza
"Cosmic Colors" (featuring Trixie Mattel)	2022	Ash Gordon, Brian Firkus, Tomas Costanza	No producer credited

=== As featured artist ===
==== Singles ====
Title	Artist	Year	Writer(s)	Producer(s)
"Revolution" (Vinyl Motel featuring Ash Gordon)	Vinyl Motel	2022	Tomas Costanza, Tyler J Connaghan	Tomas Costanza
"We Got It" (Vinyl Motel featuring Ash Gordon)	Vinyl Motel	2022	Tomas Costanza, Tyler J Connaghan	Tomas Costanza

== Awards and nominations ==
Year	Award-giving body	Category	Work	Results	Ref.
2023	Queerty Awards	Live Theater	Drag: The Musical	Won	
