= Lagoona Bloo =

American drag queen

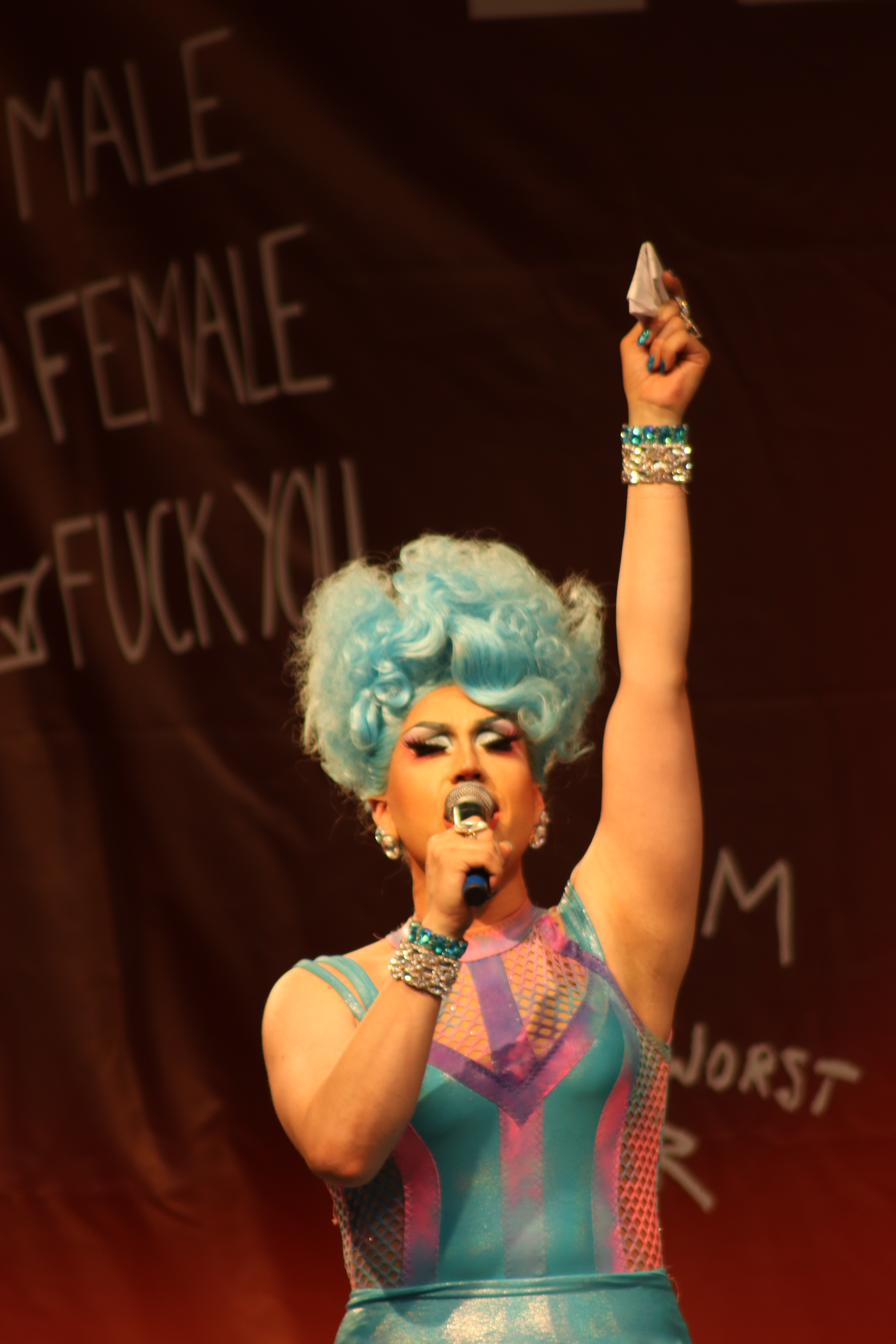
- Lagoona Bloo in 2019
- Born: David Brumfield; Prairieville, Louisiana, U.S.
- Occupation: Recording artist
- Website: www.lagoonabloo.com

Lagoona Bloo is the stage name of David Brumfield, a New York City-based recording artist and drag queen.

== Career ==
In 2021, Lagoona entered the music scene when she wrote and released her first two singles, "Greedy With My Love" (which has accrued over 400,000 streams on Spotify) and “Hands”, along with her debut EP, AQUA, and her original holiday bop, "Bloo Christmas." In 2022, she released new singles "C U Tonight", "Sticky Sweet" (with RuPaul's Drag Race alum, Lemon), and "Say It To The Sky". In 2023, Lagoona released the single "Still Around" and a cover of "Boom, Boom, Boom, Boom!!" featuring Alaska, which is the first single off of her debut studio album Underwater Bubble Pop. Her debut studio album, Underwater Bubble Pop, was released on April 26th, 2024.

Lagoona is the recipient of two 2022 Glam Awards for Best Vocalist and Best Cabaret Show (for Bloos in the Night). As a member of drag pop vocal trio Stephanie's Child (with drag sisters Jan and Rosé), Lagoona appeared on NBC's The Voice (alongside Jessie J) and America's Got Talent. Stephanie's Child released their first EP, Christmas Dolls: Volume I at the end of 2020, and were most recently featured on Alaska's song, "Girlz Night" from her studio album Red 4 Filth.

Lagoona was also featured on an episode of Netflix's Emmy award-winning series Nailed It! where she and her teammate Selma Nilla brought home the top prize.

Lagoona has been featured in national commercials for Uber and Beats by Dr. Dre, as well as multiple social media campaigns for Bubly Sparkling Water (with Kim Petras). Some of Lagoona's most notable live performances include World Pride, London Pride, singing with the American Pops Orchestra, opening for Vincint at Irving Plaza, and originating the role of Tuna Turner in "Drag: The Musical" at The Bourbon Room in Los Angeles and Off-Broadway at New World Stages in New York City. Lagoona also appears on its soundtrack on the songs "Welcome To The Fishtank" and "Drag Is Expensive." She opened for RuPaul's Drag Race All Stars Season 2 winner Alaska Thunderfuck on her 34-city Red 4 Filth tour. She most recently opened for Aqua in New York City on June 26, 2023.
