= Drag Isn't Dangerous =

2023 charity telethon

- Genre: Telethon
- Created by: Producer Entertainment Group
- Directed by: John Mark
- Presented by: Justin Martindale; Peppermint
- Theme music composer: Ash Gordon; Ocean Kelly; Drew Louis
- Opening theme: "Drag Isn't Dangerous"
- Country of origin: United States
- Original language: English

Production
- Executive producers: Emerson Collins; Matt Weaver
- Running time: 270 minutes
- Production companies: Five Senses Reeling; GLAAD; OutTV; Q.Digital; Serv Vodka; Trixie Cosmetics

Original release
- Network: Moment; Twitch; YouTube
- Release: May 7, 2023

Drag Isn't Dangerous: A Digital Fundraiser is a charity livestream telethon organized by the Producer Entertainment Group, that was held on May 7, 2023, from 7:00 pm to 11:30 pm (EDT). It was aimed to raise awareness that supports drag and trans organizations. The telethon was hosted by comedian Justin Martindale and drag performer Peppermint, and featured many prominent celebrities and drag performers.

The telethon event lasted for 270 minutes and raised over US$523,000; all the proceeds went to several LGBTQ+ organizations, including GLAAD, GLSEN, and the ACLU Drag Defense Fund. A charity single was also released, performed by Jayelle and Ocean Kelly.

== Background ==
The Tennessee Adult Entertainment Bill was introduced in Tennessee in late February 2023, which bans public "adult cabaret performance" in front of children in the state of Tennessee. This bill was marked as "vague" and "authoritarian" in what it considers an "adult cabaret performance" although it defines it as a "male or female impersonators who provide entertainment that appeals to a prurient interest."

The bill was signed on March 2, 2023, by Republican governor Bill Lee. Tennessee is the first state in the United States to restrict public drag performances, and went into effect on July 1, 2023. This bill sparked outrage throughout the United States, including among politicians and drag queens. A federal judge of the United States District Court for the Western District of Tennessee, Tommy Parker, halted the Tennessee bill citing First Amendment concerns. Other states in the US, such as Arizona, Oklahoma, and Texas, have introduced similar anti-drag bills in 2023.

== Development and planning ==
Promotional poster for the telethon

In March 2023, Producer Entertainment Group co-partnered with Black Queer Town Hall to create a telethon campaign named, Drag Isn't Dangerous, with several companies and organizations co-presenting it. They planned the telethon event to "raise awareness and funds for LGBTQ+ causes and organizations that support drag and trans performers".

The campaign event premiered on May 7, 2023, at 4:00 pm (PDT). Online tickets were made available after the online telethon was announced for $20 via the livestreaming service Moment. An official pre-show fundraiser was later set up for people to donate, through Tiltify. Campaign merch was also released to the public, with all proceeds going to the telethon.

Many drag queens, such as Sherry Vine and Jackie Beat, announced their inclusion. The lineup also revealed several RuPaul's Drag Race contestants would take part in the event, such as Ginger Minj, Bob the Drag Queen, Jinkx Monsoon, Manila Luzon, and Trixie Mattel. Frankie Grande, Brandon Stansell, and Justin Martindale also joined the event.

In mid-April, many actors and comedians such as Margaret Cho, Leslie Jones, Ts Madison, Amy Schumer, and Charlize Theron, signed up for the telethon event. Throughout the telethon's social media, they revealed an official line-up of the event with over one-hundred participants. Jacob Slane mentioned in a BroadwayWorld article, Matt Weaver was the co-executive producer of the telethon.

== Main event ==
The telethon occurred in Los Angeles, with drag queen Peppermint and comedian Justin Martindale being the main hosts. Alaska Thunderfuck and actor Adam Shankman, were co-hosting at some points in the telethon. An official GoFundMe campaign was launched for people to donate. Celebrity phone operators included: Candis Cayne, Ginger Minj, Jinkx Monsoon, Kelly Mantle, Kerri Colby, Laganja Estranja, Monét X Change, Jai Rodriguez, Sherry Vine, Johnny Sibilly, Tammie Brown, Trinity the Tuck, and Vincint. The telethon was broadcast live, exclusively through Moment. It was also covered online such as YouTube and Twitch, though some parts were removed from its Moment deal.

=== Timeline ===
The show began at 7:00 pm EDT. The telethon consisted of musical performances, pre-taped appearances, speeches, conversations between celebrity operators and donors calling in, and comedic skits.

- 7:00 pm – Ginger Minj and Kelly Mantle talk about drag being in danger in a skit
- 7:05 pm – Peppermint and Justin Martindale introduce the telethon event and phone operators
- 7:30 pm – Trixie Mattel performs "Malibu"
- 9:48 pm – Bob the Drag Queen, in a pre-recorded video, performs "Bitch Like Me"
- 9:53 pm – Idina Menzel, Tom Kitt, and Elizabeth Gillies are featured; Menzel performs "Light"
- 10:23 pm – Salina EsTitties and Sherry Vine perform a skit in which they explain to Nadya Ginsburg that drag is not dangerous
- 10:27 pm – Jinkx Monsoon performs "The Lavender Song"
- 10:42 pm – Alaska Thunderfuck and Peaches perform "Hit Me with Your Best Shot"
- 10:46 pm – Jinkx Monsoon and Peaches perform "Wuthering Heights"
- 10:53 pm – The Boulet Brothers discuss the differences between drag
- 11:08 pm – Ginger Minj performs "I Am What I Am"
- 11:20 pm – Monét X Change, in a pre-recorded video, performs "Light of a Clear Blue Morning"
- 11:30 pm – Martindale, Peppermint, Shankman, and Alaska Thunderfuck tally up the number of donations and end the telethon

== Discography ==
A charity single was released on the same day as the telethon premiere, May 7, titled "Drag Isn't Dangerous" (2023). The single is performed by Jayelle and Ocean Kelly, written by Ashley Gordon, Drew Louis, and Ocean Kelly, and produced by Drew Louis. All the revenue from the song's downloads will be donated to the telethon.

List of singles, with selected details, showing year released
Title	Year	Songwriters	Producer	Ref.
"Drag Isn't Dangerous" (performed by Jayelle and Ocean Kelly)	2023	Ashley Gordon, Drew Louis, Ocean Kelly	Drew Louis	

== Aftermath ==
Thanks to your generosity we were able to raise over half a million dollars for the Drag Isn't Dangerous fund to gift our beneficiaries to combat this rash of harmful anti-LGBTQIA+ legislation.

— Jacob Slane and David Charpentier, crediting people who donated to the telethon.

At the end of the telethon event, their official GoFundMe campaign received over $523,000, including the ticket sale made from Moment. Trixie Mattel and Katya Zamolodchikova announced that "they'll host a livestream of the final night" of their tour, Trixie and Katya Live: The Last Show (2023), a portion of their funds will be donated to the telethon's campaign. All of the proceeds is set to be donated to "GLAAD, GLSEN, HeadCount, Black Queer Town Hall," and others.

Money raised for the 2023 charity telethon
Moment ticket sale	GoFundMe fundraiser	Total amount raised
$208,000	$315,000	$523,000+

== See also ==
- Drag panic – a moral panic that stems from the belief that drag, when exposed to minors, can be harmful, due to its perception as sexual in nature.
- LGBT rights in the United States – showcasing the history of LGBT rights from the United States, changing significantly.
- List of Drag Race contestants – features a list of various contestants from a drag reality competition franchise.
