= Diffuser (band) =

American rock band

- Origin: Long Island, New York, United States
- Genres: Alternative rock; pop punk; hard rock
- Years active: 1994–2004; 2007–present
- Labels: Chamberlain; Hollywood
- Members: Tomas Costanza; Anthony Cangelosi; Peter Schojan; Dan Leo

Diffuser is an American rock band from Long Island, New York, that was formed in 1994 by Tomas Costanza (lead vocals and guitar), Anthony Cangelosi (guitar), Lawrence Sullivan (bass) and Billy Alemaghides (drums).

== History ==
Originally the band was called Flu Thirteen and released a 7-inch entitled Edgar's Airwaves and an album entitled Spin Cycle before being signed to The Medicine Label. After being signed they released their second album titled In the Foul Key of V.

The band signed with major label Hollywood Records in 2001 and changed their name to Diffuser. In 2001 the band released their first album on Hollywood Records titled Injury Loves Melody. Their single "Karma" was included on the Mission: Impossible 2 soundtrack; it peaked at number 20 on the Billboard Mainstream Rock Tracks chart and No. 26 on the Modern Rock Tracks chart.

Sullivan and Alemaghides left the band in 2003 and were replaced by Peter Schojan and Dan Leo on bass and drums respectively. In March the band toured the country with Simple Plan, Gob and Madcap. Their second album, Making the Grade, was released in July of that year. The songs "I Wonder" and "Get It On" were used in the 2003 movie Freaky Friday. The song "Get It On" also appeared on the soundtrack for the Outlaw Volleyball video game. The first 150,000 copies of the video game contained a bonus music sampler from Diffuser.

In the fall of that year the band joined Hoobastank and The All-American Rejects on the Nokia Unwired Tour. The band did their final US tour in January 2004 with Spitalfield and Silverstein, followed by a tour in Japan in March. In April Hollywood Records dropped them, and they disbanded shortly after. Dan later joined Action Action with ex-members of The Reunion Show and Count the Stars. Diffuser has recently gotten back together and, according to their Myspace, plan to release a new album in spring of 2008 and re-release some Flu Thirteen albums. Diffuser has recently started recording their album Sincerely, Wasting Away, posting this on their MySpace page:

Hello friends, long time no talk. I hope everything is well by you. We just wanted to give everyone an update that we are currently in the studio recording our next record. Things have been going great, and we're stoked for it. We just finished tracking drums and some guitars, and it's been a blast. We will keep you updated...so for now, enjoy your holidays and stay safe!

On May 24, 2008, Diffuser uploaded two new songs from the upcoming album on their MySpace page, entitled "Falling Down" and "Free".

== Band members ==
Current lineup:

- Tomas Costanza - Guitar/Vocals
- Anthony Cangelosi - Guitar
- Peter Schojan - Bass
- Dan Leo - Drums
- Additional Musician - Keith Hille - Guitar

Former members:

- Lawrence Sullivan - Bass (1994–2003)
- Billy Alemaghides - Drums (1994–1995; 2000–2003)
- Brian Fawcett - Guitar (Flu Thirteen)(1994–1998)
- Chris Sanchez - Drums (1998–2000)

== Discography ==
Flu Thirteen:

- Edgar's Airwaves 7-inch - 1995
- Spin Cycle - 1996
- In the Foul Key of V - 1998

Diffuser:

- 35/Leaving With A California Tilt 7-inch - 2000
- Injury Loves Melody - January 23, 2001
- Making the Grade - July 15, 2003
- Sincerely, Wasting Away - August 19, 2008
- The Encore (EP) - August 23, 2024

== Videography ==
- "Karma" (2001)
- "Get It On" (2003)

== Other projects ==
Costanza played bass for The Never Enders from 2005 until the band split in 2006. They released one album, Air Raid Romance, on Indianola Records and shot one video for the single "Broken". The Never Enders are currently working on their new album.

- The Never Enders website
- The Never Enders' MySpace

Leo joined Action Action in 2004 and is still currently in the band. They are currently working on their follow-up to 2006's An Army of Shapes Between Wars which was released on Victory Records.

- Action Action website
- Action Action's MySpace
