= Making the Grade: The Economic Evolution of American School Districts =

2009 book by William Fischel

Making the Grade : The Economic Evolution of American School Districts is a 2009 non-fiction book by William A. Fischel. It is published by the University of Chicago Press.

The book argues that, in the words of Floyd M. Hammack of New York University, "local school districts have been and remain a crucial element in American educational policy."

The book states that voters supported changes in the American educational system and changes happened because of the voters; for example, the concept of one room schools was in rural areas due to their local circumstances, but schools then consolidated into larger schools when voters decided they should do so at the ballot box.

== Background ==
Fischel had written journal articles on the topic prior to creating the book.

== Contents ==
The book has six chapters. Four of them are original to the book while the other two were adapted from journals. Fischel has analyses of the geographies of school districts, with Google Earth data presented.

Fischel argued that many land owners wanted to have their land be worth more money, so they supported increased financing into public schools in proximity, and having a common school calendar.

The work also describes why some communities rejected the concept of school vouchers.

== Reception ==
Sun Go of the Korea Institute of Public Finance praised the book for being "rich in insights" about its topic. He praised the journal-derived articles for being "well adapted".

Floyd M. Hammack of New York University wrote that
