= Stephanie's Child =

American musical group

- Origin: United States
- Members: Jan Sport; Lagoona Bloo; Rosé

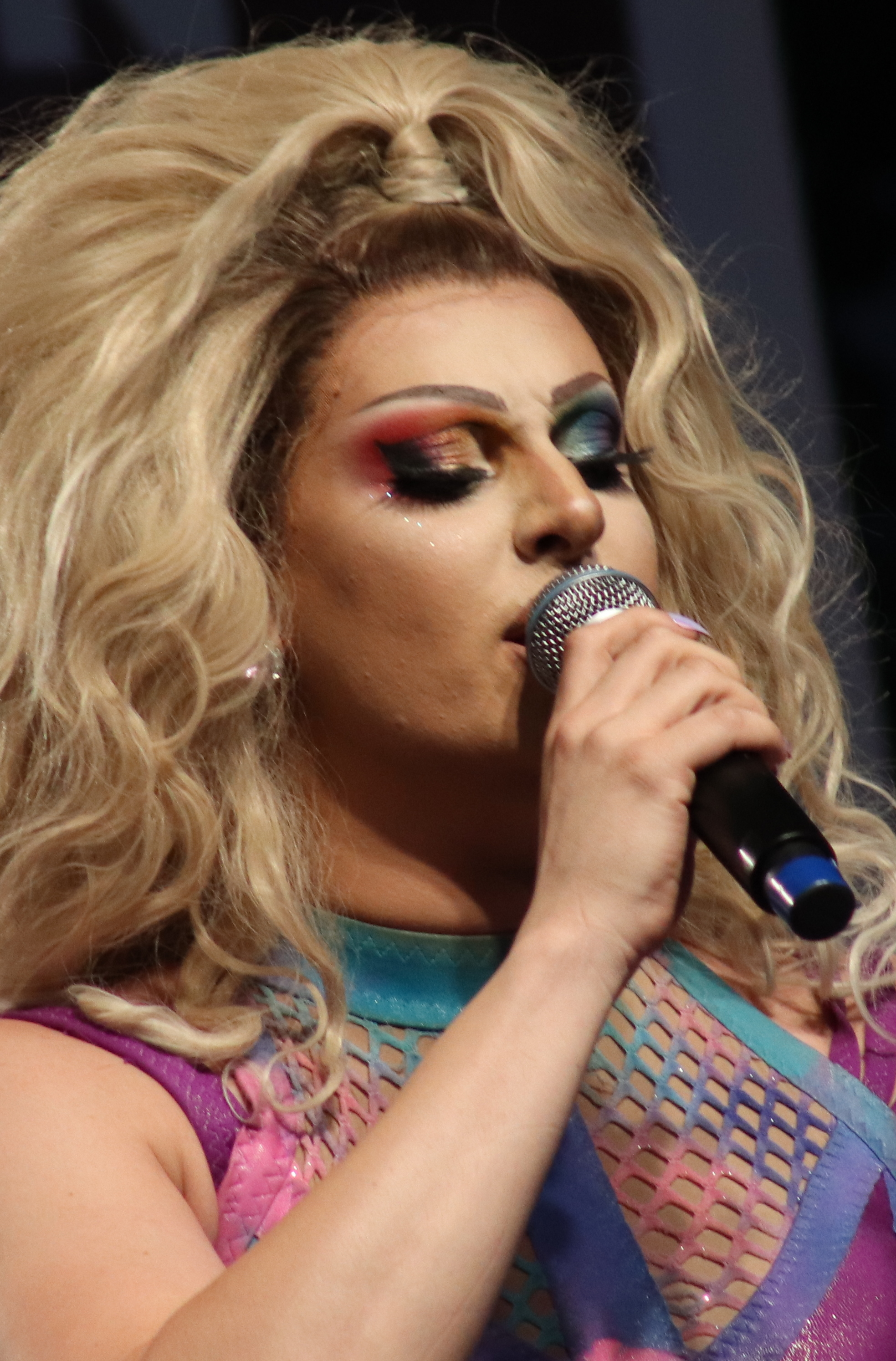
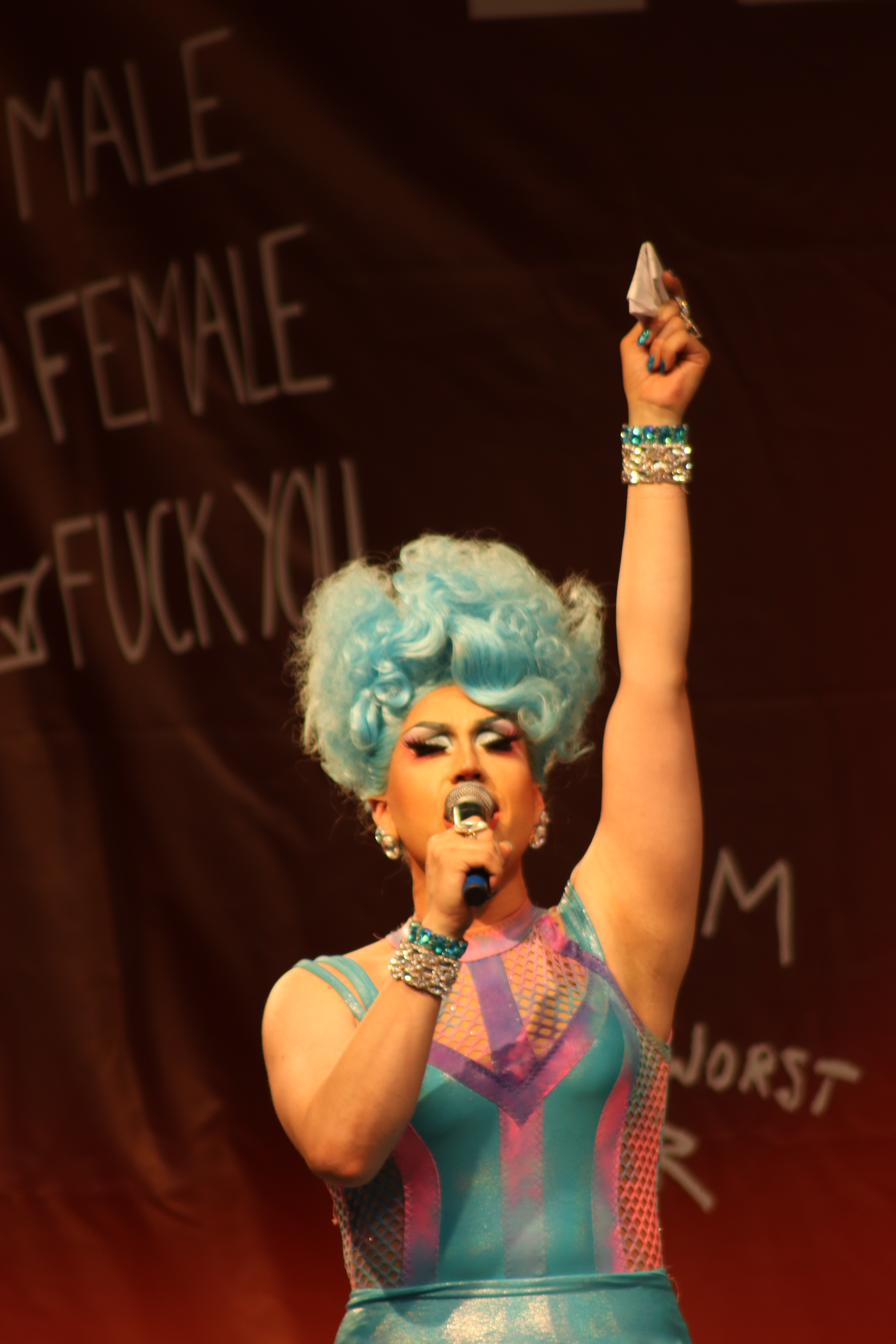
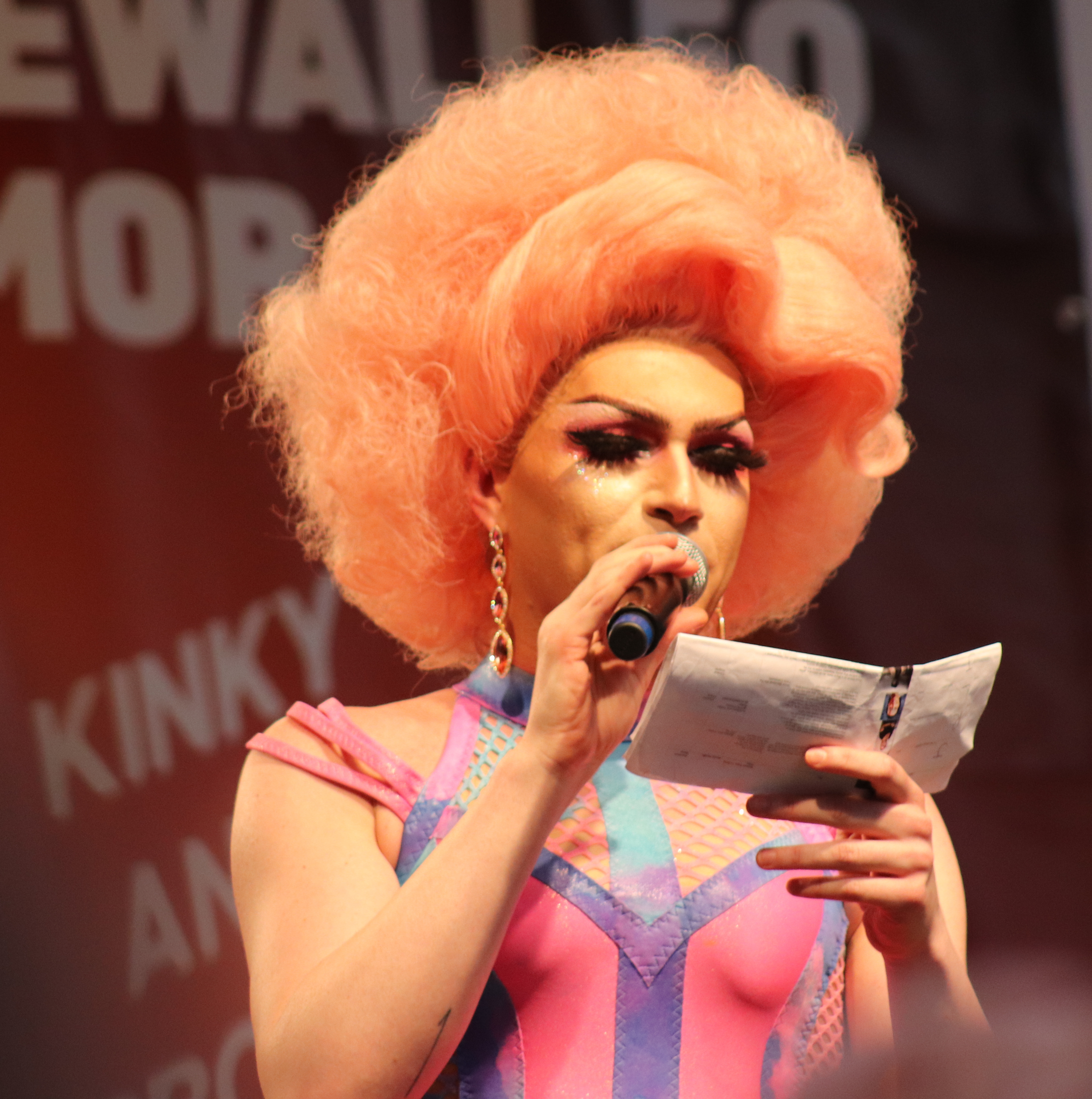
Stephanie's Child members Jan Sport (left), Lagoona Bloo (center), and Rosé (right)

Stephanie's Child is a musical group consisting of drag performers Jan Sport, Lagoona Bloo, and Rosé. The trio appeared on The Voice in 2017 performing with Jessie J and contestant Chris Weaver and auditioned for the fourteenth season of America's Got Talent where they performed "Bang Bang" in the auditions but were eliminated in the judge cuts portion after performing a medley of Demi Lovato's "Sorry Not Sorry" and "Confident". They released the holiday EP Christmas Dolls, Vol. 1 in 2020.

== Filmography ==
=== Television ===
- The Voice
- America's Got Talent

== Discography ==
=== EPs ===
- Christmas Dolls, Vol. 1 (2020)

=== Featured singles ===
- "Girlz Night" (Alaska Thunderfuck featuring Stephanie's Child) (2022)

== See also ==
- List of drag groups
