= Sincerely, Wasting Away =

Studio album by Diffuser
- Released: August 19, 2008
- Genres: Pop-punk; hard rock
- Label: Chamberlain

Diffuser chronology
Making The Grade (2003)	Sincerely, Wasting Away (2008)

Sincerely, Wasting Away is the third studio album by American rock band Diffuser. It was released on August 19, 2008 by Chamberlain Records. The title of the album come from the lyric "Yours sincerely, wasting away" from the 1967 song by The Beatles, "When I'm Sixty-Four". The band released the album after reuniting the group from its prior disbandment.

== Track listing ==
No.	Title	Length
1.	"This Is Perfection"	3:00
2.	"Free"	2:59
3.	"1-2-3-4 Dracula!"	3:46
4.	"Caught In A Dull Moment"	3:18
5.	"All Is Said And Done"	4:00
6.	"Falling Down"	2:52
7.	"Lift"	3:25
8.	"In My Life Again"	3:31
9.	"Redefined"	3:35
10.	"Shallow"	3:04
