= Gay HBO Max Song =

2025 song by Trixie Mattel

Single by Trixie Mattel
- Released: 2025
- Label: WaterTower Music

"Gay HBO Max Song" is a 2025 song by Trixie Mattel. The song references The Comeback, Euphoria, Girls, Scars of Beauty, Sex and the City, Succession, Trixie and Katya, and The White Lotus.
