= Making the Grade (album) =

Making The Grade

Studio album by Diffuser
- Released: July 15, 2003
- Recorded: September to October 2002
- Genre: Pop-punk
- Length: 41:00
- Label: Hollywood
- Producer: Mark Trombino

Diffuser chronology
Injury Loves Melody (2001)	Making The Grade (2003)	Sincerely, Wasting Away (2008)

Professional ratings
Review scores
Source	Rating
Allmusic	3/5 stars

Making The Grade is the second studio album by American rock band Diffuser, released on July 15, 2003 by Hollywood Records. It featured the band moving away from the hard rock style on their 2001 studio album Injury Loves Melody to more of a pop-punk style similar to Sum 41. The songs "I Wonder" and "Get It On" were used in the 2003 movie Freaky Friday. The song "Get It On" and "New High" also appeared on the soundtracks for the Outlaw Volleyball and NHL Hitz Pro video games, respectively.

It was produced by Mark Trombino, who has worked with bands such as blink-182, Jimmy Eat World, Sugarcult, and Finch.

== Track listing ==
All tracks are written by Tomas Costanza except where otherwise stated.

No.	Title	Writer(s)	Length
1.	"New High"	Costanza, Cangelosi	2:42
2.	"Get It On"		3:10
3.	"Only in the Movies"		2:54
4.	"Why"		4:00
5.	"I Wonder"		3:24
6.	"Far and in Between"		3:17
7.	"Breakaway"		3:17
8.	"Here's to You"		2:39
9.	"She's All Mine"		3:11
10.	"Long Way from Home"		5:44
11.	"Nothing Left to Say"	Costanza, Cangelosi	3:13
12.	"Avoid the Friction"		3:18

== Personnel ==
- Mark Trombino - Producer, Recording, Mixing
- Jason Cupp - Assistant Engineer
- Dean Nelson - Assistant Engineer
- Justin Smith - Assistant Engineer
- Dan Certa - Additional Pro Tools
- Brian Gardner - Mastering
- Peter Malkin - Management
- Enny Joo - Art Direction and Design
- Anthony Cangelosi - Art Direction and Design
- Justin Stephens - Cover Photo
- Debra Herman - Management
- Jason Jordan - A+R
