= Jan Sport =

American drag queen (born 1993)

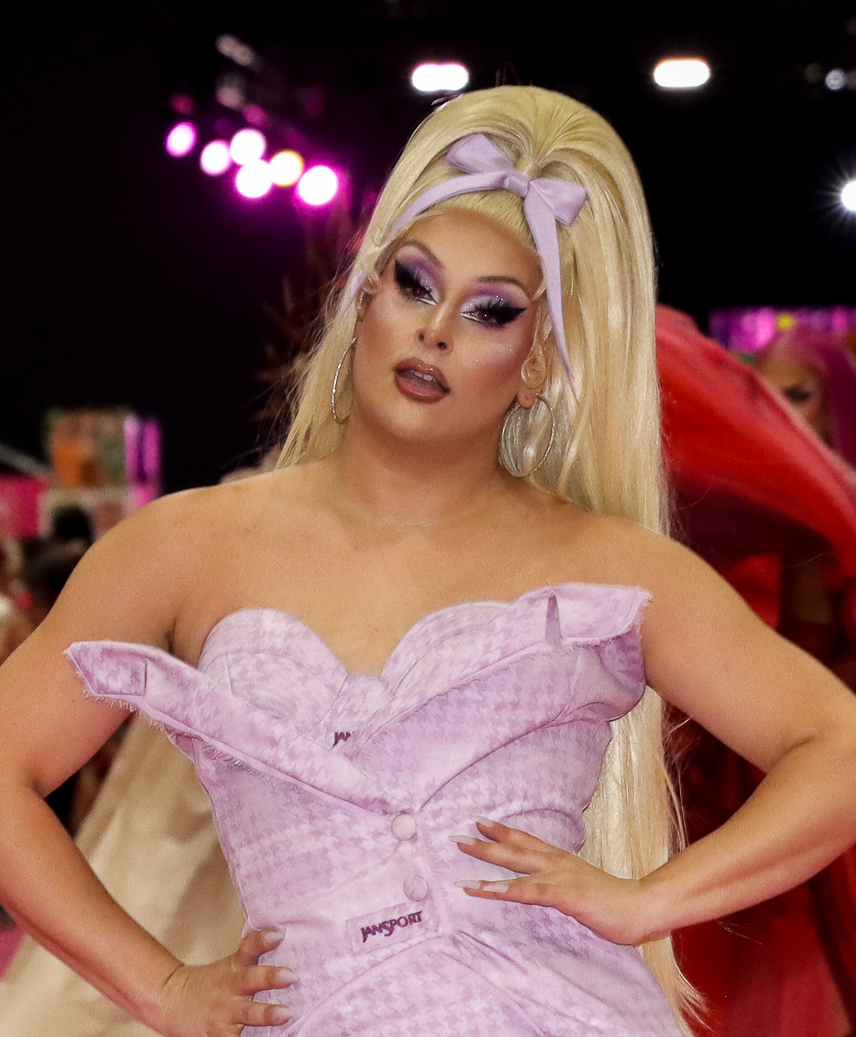
- Jan at RuPaul's DragCon LA, 2024
- Born: Charles Joseph Mantione; June 11, 1993 (age 33); Old Bridge, New Jersey, U.S.
- Other names: Jan; Charlie Mantione
- Education: Boston Conservatory (BFA)
- Occupations: Drag queen, singer
- Known for: RuPaul's Drag Race (season 12); RuPaul's Drag Race All Stars (season 6)
- Partner: EJ Dohring (engaged)

Jan Sport, sometimes known simply as Jan, is the stage name of Charlie Mantione (born Charles Joseph Mantione; June 11, 1993), an American drag queen and singer based in New York City, who came to international attention on the twelfth season of RuPaul's Drag Race. On May 26, 2021, she was announced as one of the 13 contestants on the sixth season of RuPaul's Drag Race All Stars, where she placed 7th overall.

== Early life ==
Mantione was born on June 11, 1993, in Old Bridge Township, New Jersey. He grew up Catholic and attended the all-boys Catholic school, Christian Brothers Academy. While attending school, he participated in both sports and theater. Mantione was an avid soccer player until he turned 17. Mantione participated in a number of school productions such as Oklahoma! and played Troy Bolton in a production of High School Musical. He attended the Boston Conservatory (which has since merged with the Berklee College of Music) for musical theater.

== Career ==
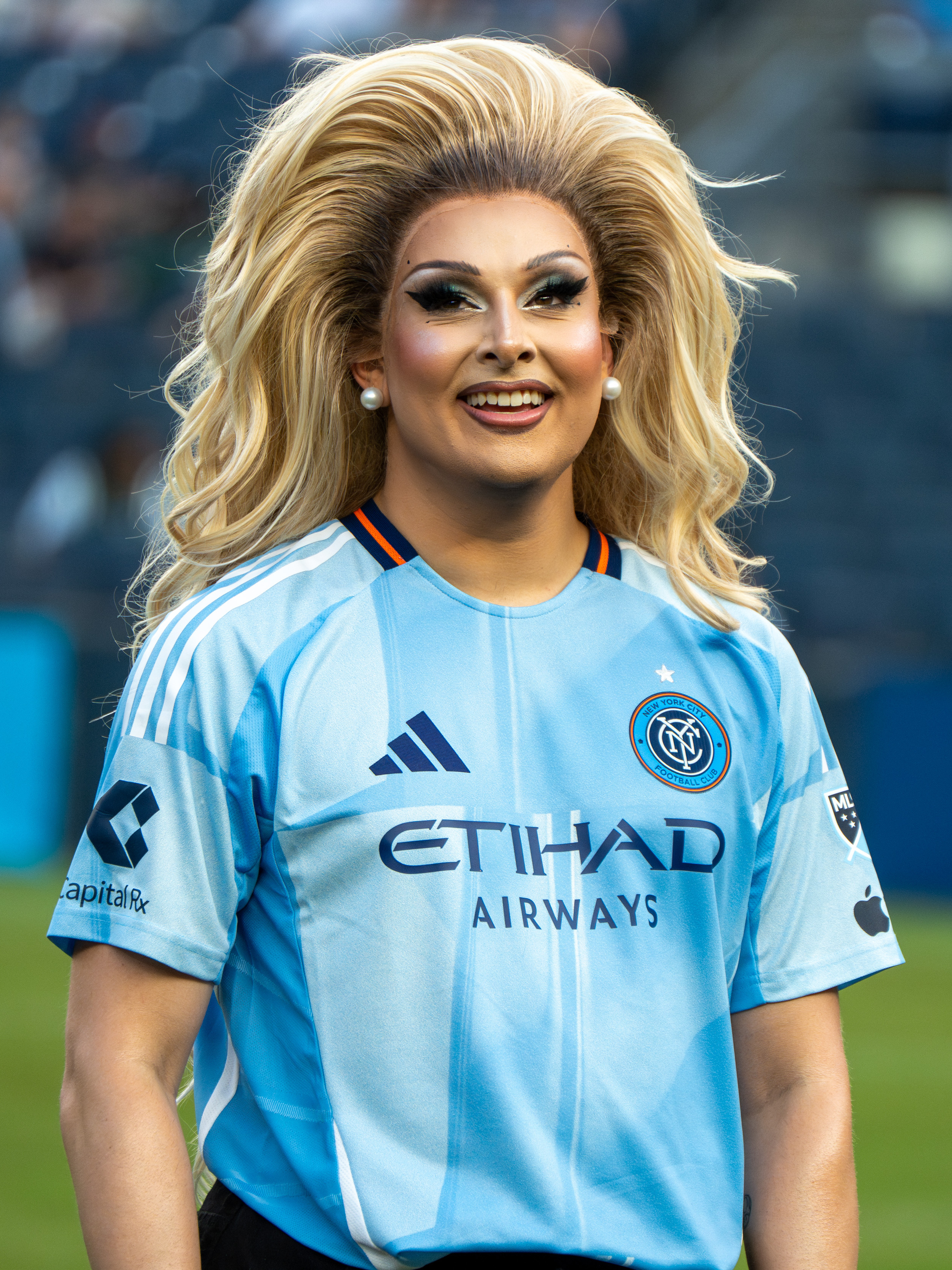
Jan Sport in 2025

Mantione considers his drag "birthday" to be July 8, 2016. Mantione formed the pop group Stephanie's Child along with queens Rosé and Lagoona Bloo in 2018. His drag mother is Alexis Michelle. In 2018, he won the title of Breakthrough Artist and was nominated for Best Vocalist at the 2018 NY Nightlife Awards. When he first started drag, he frequently appeared as a Kris Jenner impersonator.

Mantione appeared on The Voice Season 13 finale with Jessie J and competed on America's Got Talent with Stephanie's Child.

=== RuPaul's Drag Race ===
Jan's casting on the twelfth season of RuPaul's Drag Race was announced on January 23, 2020. On the show, she is referred to as simply "Jan" to avoid trademark issues with the backpack brand. She ended up in the bottom two in episode eight and was eliminated after losing a lip-sync to Widow Von'Du, finishing in eighth place.

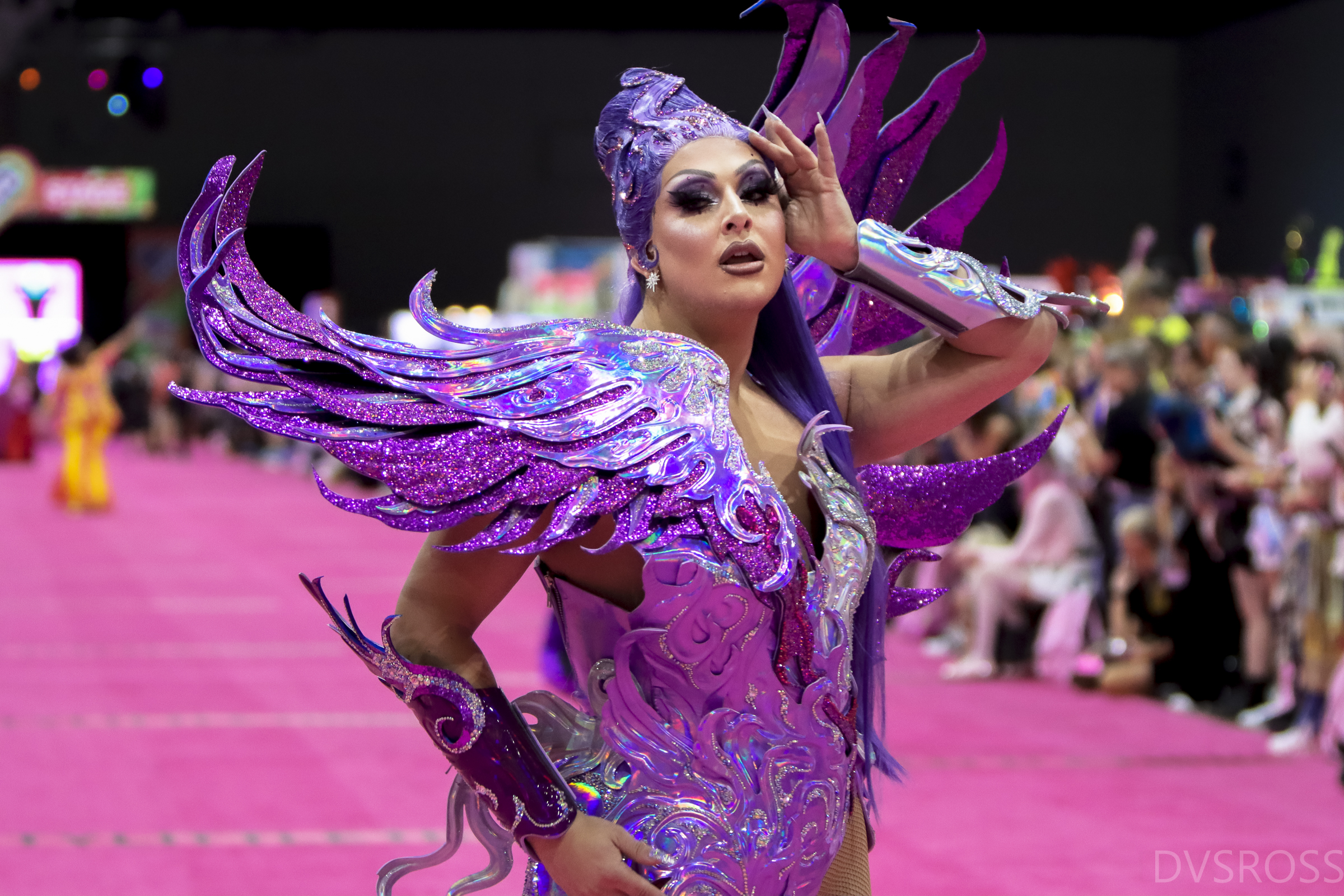
Jan at RuPaul's DragCon LA in 2022

While the show was airing, Jan contributed to a YouTube web series called Jan's Jukebox where she performed covers of the songs that queens had lip-synced to on the show that week, such as "S&M" by Rihanna and "This Is My Night" by Chaka Khan. The latter performance, which was the song she lip-synced to on the episode in which she was eliminated, was dedicated to her grandfather who had died due to complications of COVID-19.

On May 26, 2021, it was revealed that Jan would return to compete on RuPaul's Drag Race All Stars Season 6 alongside 12 other contestants. On the 4th episode of the show, she won the main challenge (Halftime Headliners) for her impression of Lady Gaga at the 2017 Halftime show and later lost the Lip-Sync For Your Legacy to Britney Spears' "Womanizer" against Lip-Sync Assassin Jessica Wild. She ultimately placed seventh, being eliminated by Trinity K. Bonet in episode 7. Her elimination marks the first time in All Stars history where the Lip-Sync Assassin (Alexis Mateo) revealed both of the bottom queens’ names (Jan and Pandora Boxx) as a result of a tie from the group vote. RuPaul revealed that, under such circumstances, the tie would have to be broken by the Top All-Star of the week (Trinity K. Bonet).

== Personal life ==
In April 2026, Mantione announced that he is engaged to his longtime partner, actor EJ Dohring.

== Filmography ==
Year	Title	Role	Notes
2021	The Bitch Who Stole Christmas	Jane McBeige	Produced by MTV Entertainment Studios and World of Wonder

=== Television ===
Year	Title	Role	Notes
2017	The Voice	Herself (with Stephanie's Child and Jessie J)	Special Guest
2019	America's Got Talent	Herself (with Stephanie's Child)	Contestant
2020	RuPaul's Drag Race (season 12)	Herself	Contestant (8th place)
2020	RuPaul's Drag Race: Untucked	Herself	Contestant (8th place)
2021	RuPaul's Drag Race All Stars (season 6)	Herself	Contestant (7th place)
2021	RuPaul's Drag Race All Stars: Untucked	Herself	Contestant (7th place)
2023	57th Annual CMT Music Awards	Herself	Performer with Kelsea Ballerini, Manila Luzon, Kennedy Davenport & Olivia Lux

=== Web series ===
Year	Title	Role	Notes	Ref
2020	Jan's Jukebox	Herself	Creator	
2020	Review with a Jew	Herself	Guest	
2020	Whatcha Packin	Herself	Guest	
2020	The X-Change Rate	Herself	Guest	
2020	Out of the Closet	Herself	Guest	
2020	Cosmo Queens	Herself	Guest	
2020	Bring Back My Ghouls	Herself	Guest	
2021	Whatcha Packin’	Herself	Guest	
2021	Ruvealing the Look	Herself	Guest	
2023	Unpacked with Jan Sport	Herself	Host; Podcast	
2023	Glam Slam	Herself	Contestant	

- Bring Back My Girls (2022, 2023)

== Discography ==
=== Singles ===
- "Slag Wars" (with The Cock Destroyers and Andrew Barret Cox, featuring Mark Mauriello and Hayley Moir) (2020)
- "Gay Hands Up" (with Peppermint and Alaska) (2021)
- "Jantasy" (with Andrew Barret Cox, Lagoona Bloo, Kelly McIntyre, Tony Clements, and Emily Trumble) (2021)
- "Call of the Wild" (with Andrew Barret Cox) (2025)

=== Featured singles ===
- "You Don't Know Me" (with the cast of RuPaul's Drag Race Season 12) (2020)
- "Madonna: The Unauthorized Rusical" (with the cast of RuPaul's Drag Race Season 12) (2020)
- "The Shady Bunch" (with the cast of RuPaul's Drag Race Season 12) (2020)
- "Show Up Queen" (with the cast of RuPaul's Drag Race All Stars Season 6) (2021)
- "Gemini (Two Sides of the Same Coin)" (Retrograde The Musical featuring Jan) (2025)

=== As a part of Stephanie's Child ===
- Christmas Dolls, Vol. 1 (2020)

== Titles ==
Competition	Title	Year
Lady Liberty (NYC)	Winner	2016
NY Nightlife Awards	Breakthrough Artist (winner)	2018
NY Nightlife Awards	Best Vocalist (nominee)	2018

== See also ==
- Drag culture in New York City
- LGBTQ culture in New York City
- List of LGBTQ people in New York City
