= Tomas Costanza =

Producer, musician, recording artist

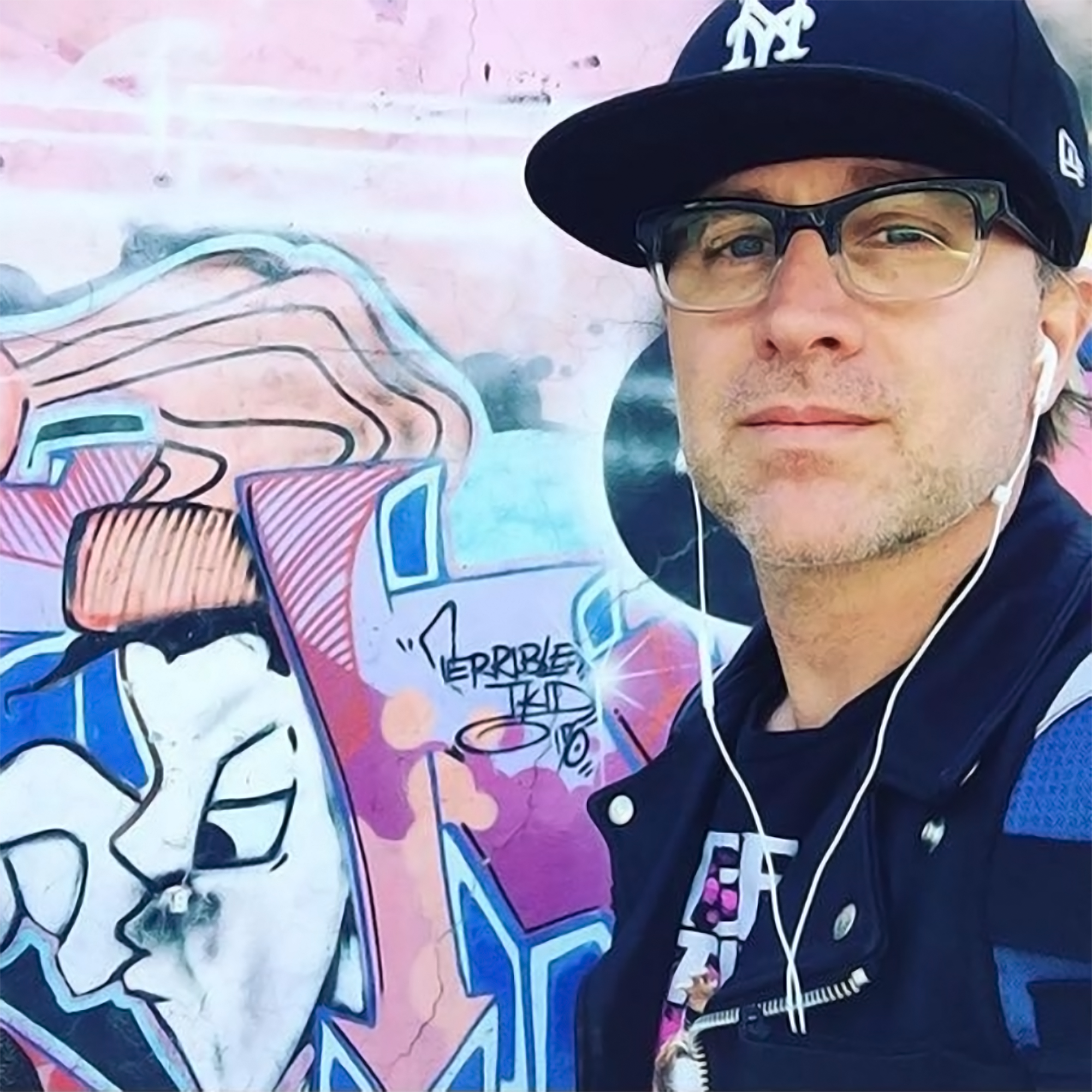
- Tomas Costanza

Background information
- Born: September 2, 1976 (age 50)
- Origin: Long Island, New York
- Genres: indie, pop punk, pop, alternative rock, rock, hip hop, metal
- Occupations: record producer, musician, playwright
- Instruments: Guitar, Vocals, Piano, Drums, Keyboard, Bass, Synthesizer
- Years active: 1999–present
- Website: www.killingsworth.info

Tomas Costanza (born September 2, 1976) is a certified-platinum American record producer, songwriter and composer. He is the founder of Killingsworth Recording Company and co-creator of DRAG: The Musical. Costanza has co-written and produced 12 Billboard number-one albums, collaborated with major artists, and secured more than a thousand licensed music placements across television, film and advertising.

== Early life and education ==
Costanza was born in North Massapequa, New York. He attended the High School of Performing Arts, where he studied classical composition with professors from the Juilliard School, and later enrolled at Berklee College of Music before leaving to pursue a career as a recording artist.

== Career ==
=== Diffuser ===
In 1998, Costanza founded the band Flu Thirteen, later renamed Diffuser. The band signed with Hollywood Records in 2000, releasing Injury Loves Melody (2001) and Making the Grade (2003). Diffuser’s music was featured in several films, including Mission: Impossible 2, Freaky Friday, Confessions of a Teenage Drama Queen, Mean Girls, and Summer Catch.

The group disbanded in 2003 but reunited in 2007 to release Sincerely, Wasting Away. In 2024, all four original members reunited again to release The Encore, their first studio album in over 20 years.

=== A&R and Killingsworth Recording Company ===
Following Diffuser’s initial breakup, Costanza joined Hollywood Records as an A&R scout under Bob Cavallo and Jason Jordan while also working as a Seven Peaks songwriter for Disney. He later served as Head of A&R for Chamberlain Records/Universal. In 2003, he founded Killingsworth Recording Company in New York, which expanded to Los Angeles in 2008. Through Killingsworth, Costanza has written, produced, and licensed music for brands including Apple, Google, Amazon, Target, Ford, and Galaxy, and for promos on NBC, ABC, CBS, HBO, Showtime, Netflix, Marvel, WWE, and Call of Duty.

=== Production and Songwriting ===
As a producer and songwriter, Costanza has collaborated with Macklemore, Darren Criss, Rachel Platten, 2 Chainz, Icona Pop, and Trixie Mattel. He has cowritten and produced twelve Billboard 200 number-one albums and ranked among Billboard (magazine) top five sync writers for seven consecutive years (2015–2021). His work has appeared in shows such as Grey’s Anatomy, American Horror Story, How to Get Away with Murder, The Good Wife, Dexter, and RuPaul’s Drag Race, as well as educational and documentary series for CBS, Comedy Central, Disney, Viceland, and Discovery.

=== Musical Theatre ===
==== DRAG: The Musical ====
Costanza co-created and produced DRAG: The Musical, which premiered in Los Angeles in 2022, returned in 2024, and transferred Off-Broadway to New World Stages in October 2024. The production ran for seven months and became the most nominated Off-Broadway musical of 2024 with 17 nominations including:

- One nomination at the Off Broadway Alliance Awards for Best Musical
- Six nominations at the 40th Annual Lucille Lortel Awards (2025), including Outstanding Musical, Outstanding Lead Performer, Outstanding Featured Performer (2), Outstanding Choreographer, and Outstanding Costume Design
- Two nominations at the 91st Annual Drama League Awards
- Seven nominations at BroadwayWorld Off-Broadway Awards, including a win for Best New Musical/Los Angeles (2022)
- Five nominations and two wins (Outstanding New Off-Broadway Musical and Outstanding Lead Performer - Nick Adams) at the 2025 Outer Critics Circle Awards
- Three nominations at the 2025 Dorian Theater Awards
- The Queerty Awards, Best Live Theatrical Show (2022 and 2024) (winner)

In 2025, GLAAD presented the show with a special recognition award at the 36th Annual GLAAD Media Awards for spotlighting the LGBTQ+ community.

In addition to its stage success, a live cast album was recorded during the Off-Broadway run and released on April 25, 2025. Produced by Costanza and Liza Minnelli, the album reached the top 10 on the Billboard Cast Albums chart. Minnelli joined the producing team ahead of the show’s New York opening—her first time producing a full-length musical—and contributed a voiceover cameo in the show and on the album.

A London production is planned for 2026.

== Upcoming projects ==
Costanza is developing Astrologia, co-written with Spencer Liff, scheduled for workshops in 2026 and a New York run in 2027.

== Advocacy ==
Beyond his artistic career, Costanza is an advocate for autism awareness and partners with The Nicholas Center to support children on the spectrum.
