= Producer Entertainment Group =

- Founded: 2011; 14 years ago
- Founder: David Charpentier; Jacob Slane
- Distributor: Alternative Distribution Alliance
- Country of origin: United States
- Location: Burbank, California
- Official website: producerentertainment.com

Producer Entertainment Group (PEG), also affiliated with Producer Entertainment Group Records (PEGR), is an American talent management firm and production company based in Burbank, California. The group manages LGBTQ+ talent across the globe, including past competitors from the Drag Race franchise.

== History ==
=== 2011–2019: Early beginnings and lawsuit ===
The talent management company was founded in 2011 by both David Charpentier and Jacob Slane, and is managed by them along with Ryan Aceto.

In 2016, Producer Entertainment Group launched the first official world tour named RuPaul's Drag Race: Battle of the Seasons, which featured a lineup of contestants from the reality series. The tour ran through 2016, visiting over 60 cities around the world.

On April 4, 2017, drag queen Adore Delano filed a lawsuit against the management company, alleging that they had embezzled millions of dollars that were owed to them from appearance fees, record sales, and concerts. Delano alleging had earned $2.5 million over the past three years and was only paid $300,000. The company denied the allegations made from the singer and retaliated with a countersuit against Delano. The lawsuit was dismissed by a judge who awarded no money to either party.

Between 2018 and 2019, PEG partnered with talent agencies Clear Talent Group and The Benedetti Group (fka Executive PR and Talent) and was labeled a "super firm" by The Hollywood Reporter. In 2019 PEG also announced a music distribution deal with Warner Music Group’s Alternative Distribution Alliance. During this time, PEG Records also released the first Billboard #1 charting album from a drag artist.

=== 2020–present: New business ventures ===
In response to the COVID-19 pandemic entertainment shutdown in 2020, the entertainment company partnered with GLAAD and Amazon to announce "Digital Drag Fest", an online LGBT and drag festival. They have also partnered up with the Grammy Museum for the online festival. PEG also partnered with talent agency ICM Partners to jointly represent clients including Katya Zamolodchikova and Trixie Mattel.

In March 2021, OUTtv Media Group announced a joint venture with Producer Entertainment Group to launch "OUTtv USA" on Apple TV, this marks the streaming service's first LGBTQ streaming channel.

In September 2021, Producer Entertainment Group debuted a vodka line in collaboration with the Mexican distillery Casa Maestri. The line, titled SERV Vodka, consists of six flavors each inspired by a drag queen on the PEG roster: pineapple (Manila Luzon); pink lemonade (Trixie Mattel); mixed berries (Trinity the Tuck); blood orange (Sharon Needles); green apple (Monét X Change); and original (Alaska Thunderfuck).

In October 2022, the talent management company announced a collaboration with Warner Chappell Music, launching "PEG Music Publishing".

In March 2023, when the Tennessee drag ban bill came into effect, PEG partnered with several companies and organizations to create a telethon campaign named, Drag Isn't Dangerous. Many artists from their roster are taking part in the event, such as Ginger Minj and Jinkx Monsoon.

== Signed artists ==
=== Current ===
The roster is listed in alphabetical order.

- Alaska 5000
- BeBe Zahara Benet
- Brandon Stansell
- Bob the Drag Queen
- Boulet Brothers
- Darienne Lake
- Desmond is Amazing
- Divina de Campo
- Eureka
- Ginger Minj
- Gottmik
- Jackie Beat
- Jiggly Caliente
- Jimbo
- Jinkx Monsoon
- Jujubee
- Justin Martindale
- Katya Zamolodchikova
- Lady Bunny
- Manila Luzon
- Miz Cracker
- Monét X Change
- Peppermint
- Plane Jane
- Salina EsTitties
- Sapphira Cristál
- Sharon Needles
- Sherry Vine
- Thorgy Thor
- Trinity the Tuck
- Trixie Mattel
