= Sengiin Oyun-Erdene =

Mongolian contortionist

Sengiin Oyun-Erdene (Mongolian: Сэнгийн Оюун Эрдэнэ; born 1993, Mongolia) is a Mongolian actress of the Cirque du Soleil and contortionist.

In 2024, contortionist Oyun-Erdene broke the record listed in Guinness World Records by performing the most contortion roll push-ups in 30 seconds, beating the previous record of 21 with her 24, thereby, she became the Guinness World Records title holder. In total, Mongolian contortionist did 28 push-ups, but several push-ups were not counted due to incorrect technique.

Guinness World Records Adjudicator Megan Bruce said,

I knew the cast of Cirque du Soleil were good, but seeing these record attempts in person and up close was something else. I was amazed by the level of flexibility and upper body strength shown by Oyun-Erdene and Lucie’s attempt was lightning fast as she managed to beat the record with at least five seconds to spare. Congratulations to both performers for breaking such physically demanding record titles.
