= Séptimo Día - No Descansaré =

Former Cirque du Soleil production

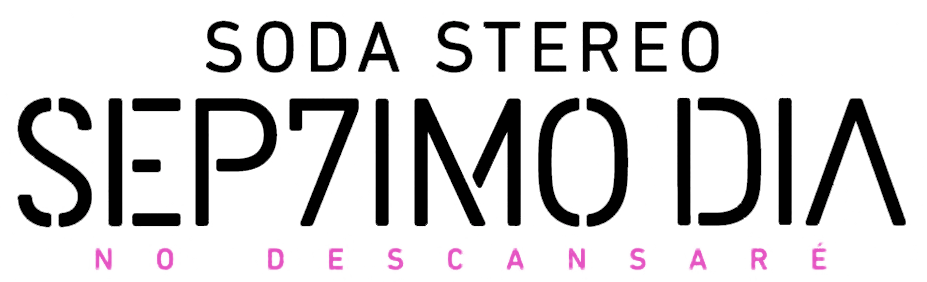
- Logo for Cirque du Soleil's Sép7imo Día - No Descansaré
- Company: Cirque du Soleil
- Genre: Contemporary circus
- Show type: Touring show
- Date of premiere: 9 March 2017 (Buenos Aires)
- Final show: 23 September 2018 (Buenos Aires)

Creative team
- Creative Guide: Jean-François Bouchard; Charles Goron; Diego Saenz; Daniel Kon
- Director: Michel Laprise
- Director of Creation: Chantal Tremblay
- Costume Designer: Dominique Lemieux
- Acrobatic Performance Designer: Germain Guillemot
- Sound Designer: Hernan Hupieri
- Projections: Mathieu St-Arnaud
- Sceneographer: Heather Shaw
- Acro Equipment Designer: Ewen Seagal

Other information
- Preceded by: Luzia (2016)
- Succeeded by: Volta (2017)
- Official website

Séptimo Día - No Descansaré (stylized as Sép7imo Día) was a touring arena show by Cirque du Soleil, inspired by the music of Argentine band Soda Stereo.

== Acts ==
- Skipping ropes
- Aerial revolver
- Hand balancing
- Arms and legs ballet
- Hair hang
- TV Overdose
- Diabolo
- Russian cradle
- Sand painting
- Water tank
- Aerial chains and grill
- Campfire
- Suspended pole
- Power track and banquine

== Music ==
The music for the show was produced and mixed by the two surviving members of the band Soda Stereo, Zeta Bosio and Charly Alberti, and was co-produced by Adrián Taverna, who created new versions and mash-ups of the songs especially for the show.

The following tracks are from the official album (and live show soundtrack) and feature remixes and mashups of the band's songs:

1. En El Séptimo Día (Prologue)
2. Cae el Sol / Planta (Opening Celebration)
3. Picnic en el 4to B / Te Hacen Falta Vitaminas / Mi Novia Tiene Bíceps (Skipping Ropes)
4. Ella Usó, Un Misil (Character Transition)
5. Prófugos (Aerial Revolver)
6. En Remolinos (Handbalancing on Canes)
7. Crema de Estrellas (Arms and Legs Ballet)
8. Cuando Pase el Temblor (Transition)
9. Luna Roja (Hair Hang)
10. Fue (Transition)
11. Sobredosis de TV (TV Overdose)
12. Planeador (with samples from Disco Eterno) / Persiana Americana (Diabolo)
13. Signos (Russian Cradle Wheel)
14. Un Millón de Años Luz (Sand Painting)
15. Hombre al Agua (Water Tank)
16. En La Ciudad de la Furia (Aerial Grill and Chains)
17. Crema de estrellas / Te Para Tres (Campfire)
18. Primavera Cero (Suspended Pole)
19. Sueles dejarme sólo (instrumental) / Corazón Delator (Fast Track Setup)
20. De Música Ligera (with samples from X-Playo) (Fast Track and Banquine)
21. Terapia de amor intensiva (Finale)

== Tour ==
Séptimo Día unusually began its arena tour in Argentina (instead of in Montreal, where Cirque du Soleil's touring shows usually premiere), as it was the country of origin of the band Soda Stereo, on which the show's concept was based.
