= Jaures Kombila =

Gabonese contortionist

Jaures Kombila is a 21st-century Gabonese contortionist who is so flexible that he has been accused of witchcraft.

== Early life ==
Kombila's body was flexible from a young age.

== Career ==
Kombila works as a professional contortionist. His unusual flexibility has led to stigma and him being accused of being a witch.

As of September 2022, over 115,500 people followed Kombila's TikTok channel.
