= Goloborodko =

Goloborodko or Holoborodko (Cyrillic: Голобородько) is a gender-neutral Ukrainian surname. Notable people with the surname include:

- Aleksandr Goloborodko (born 1938), Ukrainian-born Russian actor
- Alexey Goloborodko (born 1994), Russian contortionist
- Vasily Petrovych Goloborodko, fictional character in the Ukrainian TV series Servant of the People
- Vasyl Holoborodko (born 1945), Ukrainian poet
