= Marinelli bend =

Contortion posture

Marinelli bend is a form of contortion posture in which the performer (most often female) supports their whole body weight only by biting onto a mouth grip attached to a short post in a backbend position with their buttocks sitting on their own head. It is considered to be one of the most difficult and dangerous contortion positions, and is usually the climax during a contortion performance.

== Etymology ==
This name comes from the contortionist and international theatrical agent H.B. Marinelli (1864-1924).

== Double Marinelli bend ==
This is a Marinelli bend in which the contortionist performs a Marinelli position with another contortionist doing a handstand on their top so that the former is holding the weight of two persons only by their mouth. This is considered to be an extremely difficult contortion act, and is exclusively performed by Mongolian or sometimes Chinese contortionists. The bend normally lasts for 5–6 seconds from the moment the Marinelli bend contortionist releases their hands from the floor.

== Triple Marinelli bend ==
This is a Marinelli bend in which the contortionist performs a Marinelli position with two other contortionists on their top so that the one in Marinelli bend is holding the weight of three persons only by their mouth. From all available documented records only one trio of contortionists have managed to achieve it.

== Spinning Marinelli bend ==
This is a Marinelli bend in which the contortionist performs a Marinelli position on specially built equipment that can slowly spin 360 degrees.

== Duration record ==
Contortionist Tsatsral Erdenebileg from Mongolia is the current Guinness World Record holder for the longest Marinelli bend achieved at 4 minutes 17 seconds on 24 Jul 2013. She broke her own previous record held in May for 2 minutes and 34 seconds.

The prior record was held by Iona Luvsandorj for 50 seconds in 2009.
