= Christine Danton =

Australian contortionist

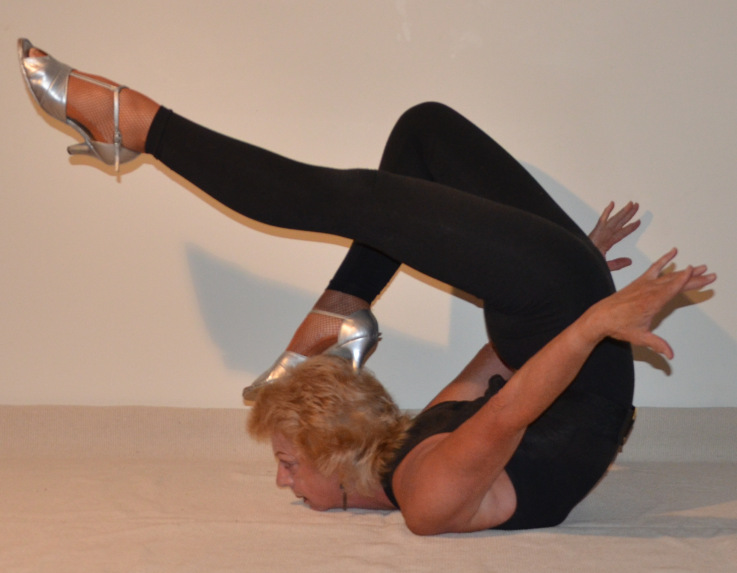
The Amazing Cristina at 66

Christine Danton (Shillaker), professionally billed as "The Amazing Cristina" (aged: 80–82) is an Australian contortionist who still performed her contortion act at the age of 71 in 2016. Celebrating over 50 years as a professional performer, Christine has been featured on several TV Shows, including "Just for the Record" and "Australia's Got Talent", and has worked internationally in theatre, film and circus. In the early 1960s while performing in Europe, Christine was asked to pose for the medical journal "Hypermobility of Joints", and it was those b&w images that were used in early (and possibly later) editions of that publication. Christine performs her contortion act on a regular basis and is also in great demand as an "After Dinner Speaker".

Christine started her professional career as a dancer/contortionist in the early days of Australian television in Adelaide and went on to tour internationally as a featured cabaret artist.
