= Joseph Clark (contortionist) =

English contortionist

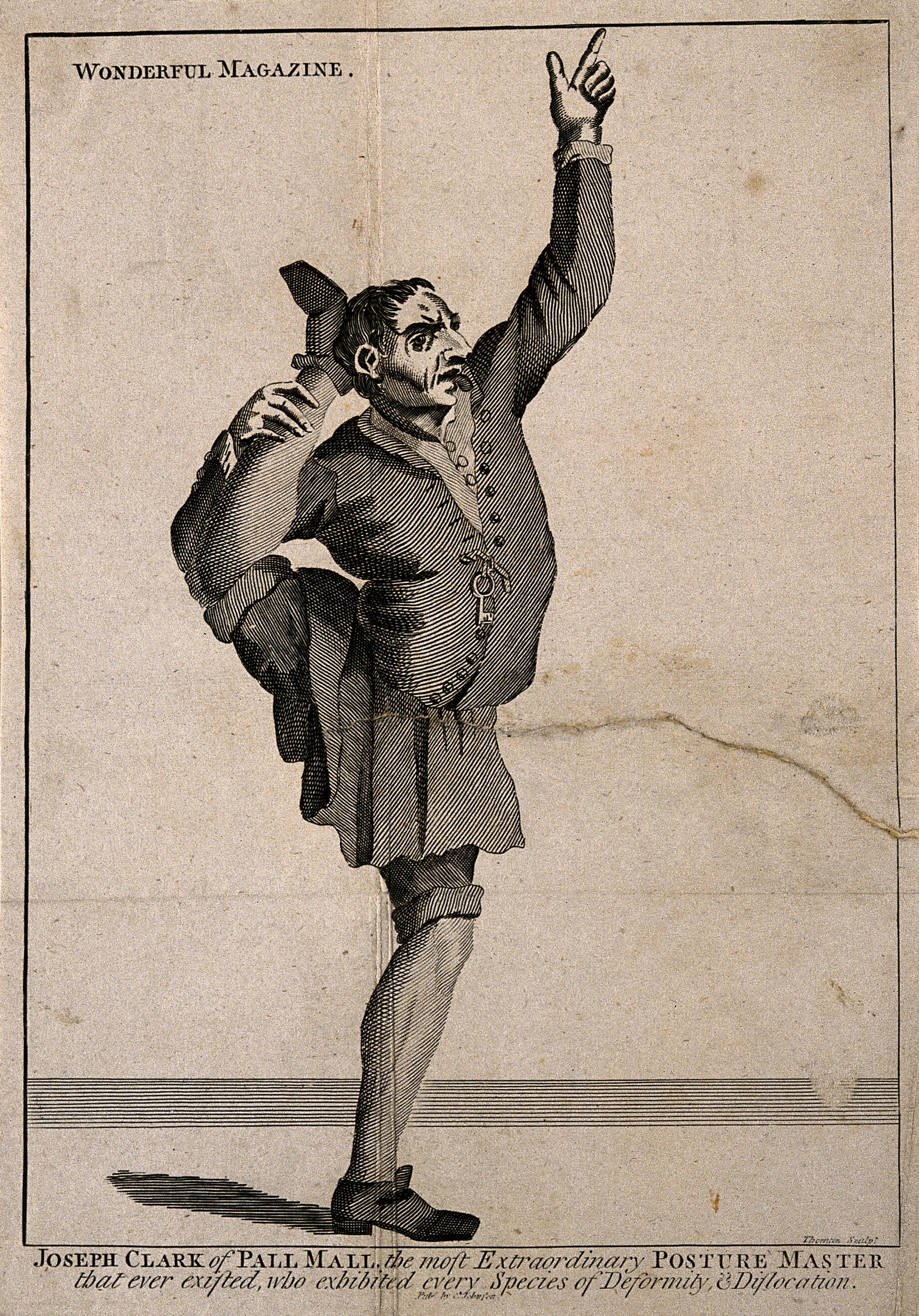
- Died: c. 1696
- Occupation: Contortionist

Joseph Clark (died c. 1696) was an English contortionist.

== Biography ==
Clark of Pall Mall, although a well-grown man, and inclining to stoutness, was enabled to contort his body in such a manner as to represent almost any kind of deformity and dislocation. The Guardian (No. 102) speaks of him as having been "the plague of all the tailors about town," for he would be measured in one posture, which he changed for another when his clothes were brought home. He even imposed upon the famous surgeon, James Molins, to whom he applied as a pretended patient. He dislocated the vertebræ of his back and other parts of his body in so frightful a fashion that Molins was shocked at the sight, and would not so much as attempt his cure. Among other freaks he often passed as a begging cripple with persons in whose company he had been but a few minutes before. Upon such occasions he would not only twist his limbs out of shape, but entirely alter the expression of his face. His powers of facial contortion are said to have been equally extraordinary. Clark was dead before 1697; John Evelyn, in his "Numismata," published in that year, mentions him as "our late Proteus Clark" (p. 277). A year later a brief account of him was communicated to the Royal Society (Phil. Trans. xx. 262). He is the subject of two drawings, by Marcellus Laroon, in Pierce Tempest's "Cryes and Habits of London," 1688.
