= David Burtka =

American actor and professional chef

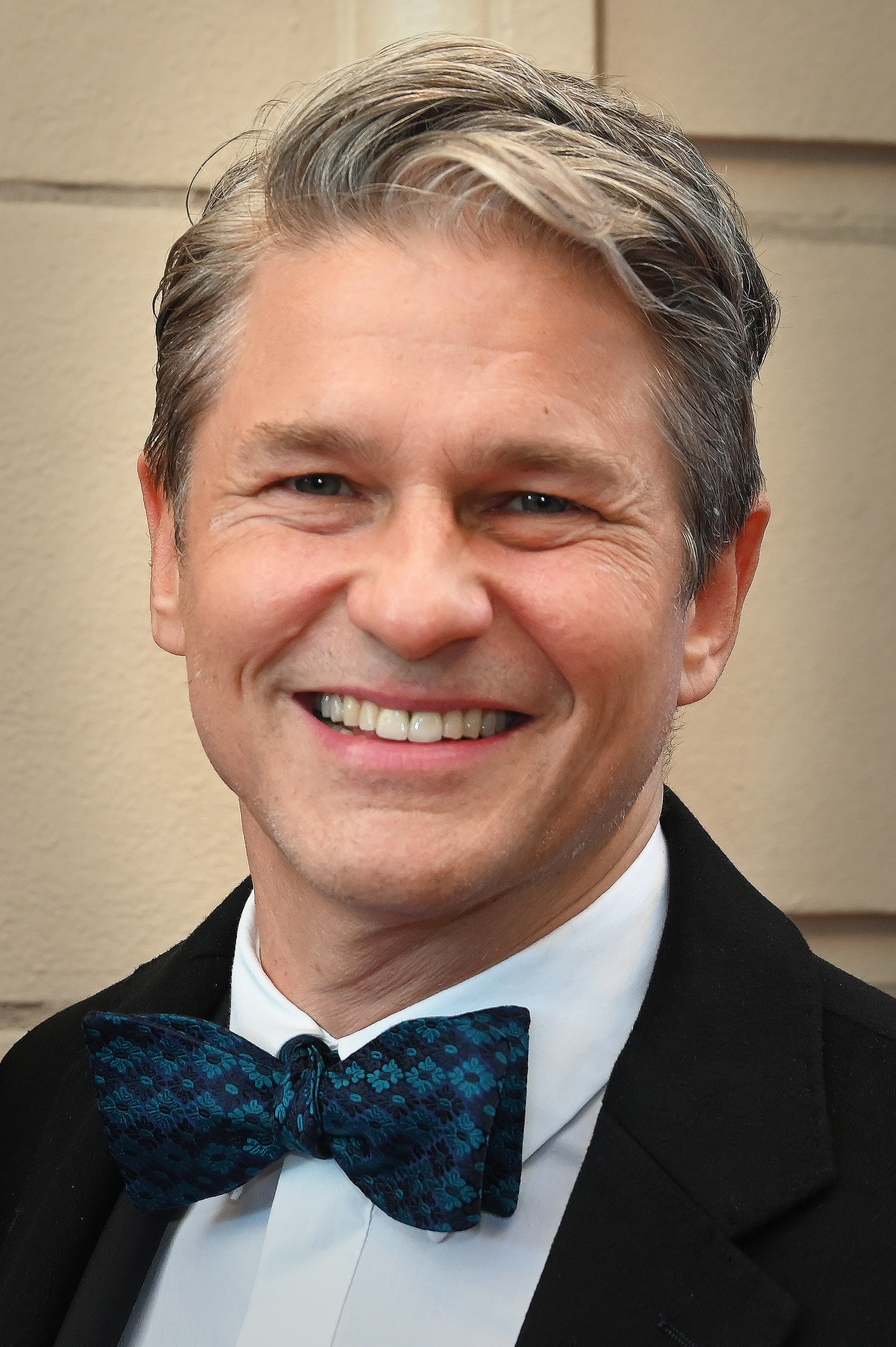
- Burtka in 2025
- Born: David Michael Burtka; May 29, 1975 (age 51); Dearborn, Michigan, U.S.
- Education: University of Michigan (BFA)
- Occupations: Actor; chef
- Years active: 1999–present (actor); 2009–present (chef)
- Spouse: Neil Patrick Harris (m. 2014)
- Children: 2

David Michael Burtka (born May 29, 1975) is an American actor and chef.

== Early life ==
David Burtka was born in Dearborn, Michigan, the son of Deborah A. Zajas (died 2008) and Daniel Burtka. He is of Polish descent. He grew up in Canton, Michigan, and graduated from Salem High School in 1993. He trained in acting at Interlochen Center for the Arts, obtained his Bachelor of Fine Arts from the University of Michigan and had further training at the William Esper Studios.

== Acting career ==
Burtka made his television debut in 2002 with a guest role on The West Wing. This was followed by a guest appearance on Crossing Jordan.

Burtka made his Broadway debut as Tulsa in the 2003 revival of Gypsy, which starred Bernadette Peters. He played The Boy in the American premiere of Edward Albee's The Play About the Baby, for which he won the 2001 Clarence Derwent Award for most promising male performer.

In 2004, Burtka originated the role of Matt Mateo in the musical The Opposite of Sex and reprised the role in the work's East Coast premiere in the summer of 2006.

Burtka appeared in seven episodes of How I Met Your Mother, playing Scooter, the former high school boyfriend of Lily Aldrin (Alyson Hannigan). Burtka made a cameo appearance in A Very Harold & Kumar 3D Christmas, as himself, opposite Neil Patrick Harris.

Burtka starred in Osiris Entertainment's 2013 film Annie and the Gypsy, and had a featured role in the 2014 film Dance-Off.

In 2015, Burtka returned to Broadway in a musical comedy, directed by David Hyde Pierce and entitled It Shoulda Been You. An Off-Broadway revival of Yasmina Reza's God of Carnage at Theatre Row featuring Burtka began previews on April 18, 2023, and opened on April 27, 2023. Burtka starred along with Carey Cox, Gabe Fazio and Christiane Noll.

== Culinary career ==
While living in Los Angeles, Burtka took a hiatus from acting full-time to become a professional chef. He graduated from Le Cordon Bleu College of Culinary Arts Pasadena in the summer of 2009; afterwards, he began running a Los Angeles catering company, "Gourmet MD". Burtka's cookbook, Life is a Party, a collection of recipes and tips on entertaining, was published in April 2019.

== Personal life ==
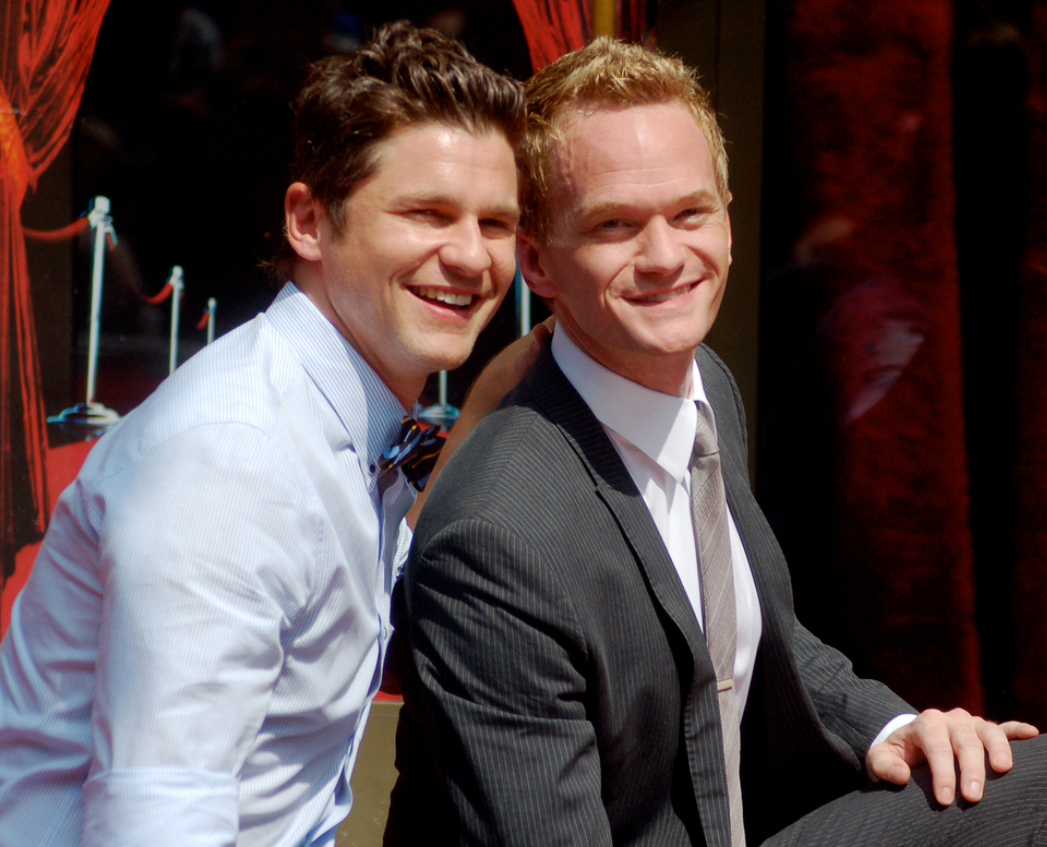
Burtka with his husband, Neil Patrick Harris, in September 2011.

Burtka was in a relationship with Lane Janger in the early 2000s, around the time Janger was expecting twins via surrogacy. Although not the biological or legal father of the children, Burtka helped raise them during his relationship with Janger, and has remained close to them after he and Janger split.

Burtka has been in a relationship with Neil Patrick Harris since April 2004. In October 2010 they became parents to twins, Harper and Gideon, who were born via a surrogate mother.

Following the passage of the Marriage Equality Act in New York on June 24, 2011, Burtka and Harris announced their engagement, stating that they had proposed to each other five years earlier but had kept the engagement secret until same-sex marriage became legal in their state. They married in Italy in September 2014.

== Filmography ==
=== Film ===
Year	Title	Role	Notes
1999	24 Nights	Toby	
2007	Worldly Possession	Andrew Bates	Television film
2007	Open House	Husband	Short film
2007	Army Guy	Keith	Short film
2011	A Very Harold & Kumar 3D Christmas	Himself	
2011	Gaysharktank.com	Broadway Guy	Short film
2012	Annie and the Gypsy	Martin	
2013	The Gay Christian Mingle	Alan	Short film
2014	Dance-Off	JT	
2020	Cicada	Bo	

=== Television ===
Year	Title	Role	Notes
2002	The West Wing	Bruce	Episode: "The Black Vera Wang"
2005	Crossing Jordan	Craig Heeley	Episode: "Total Recall"
2006–2014	How I Met Your Mother	Scooter	7 episodes
2007	CSI: NY	David King	Episode: "Down the Rabbit Hole"
2012–2013	Neil's Puppet Dreams	Himself	7 episodes
2013	Iron Chef America	Himself	Episode: "Zakarian vs. Chiarello: Scotch"
2014	RuPaul's Drag Race	Himself (guest judge)	Episode: "Drag My Wedding"
2015	Beat Bobby Flay	Himself (guest judge)	Episode: "No Training Wheels"
2015	American Horror Story: Freak Show	Michael Beck	Episode: "Curtain Call"
2018	A Series of Unfortunate Events	Mr. Willums	2 episodes
2020	Home Movie: The Princess Bride	Princess Buttercup	Episode: "Chapter Five: Life Is Pain"
2022	Uncoupled	Jerry	Episode: "Chapter 6"
2023	Drag Me to Dinner	Himself (judge)	10 episodes
2026	Elle	Chad	3 episodes

== Bibliography ==
- Life Is a Party: Deliciously Doable Recipes to Make Every Day a Celebration (2019), (ISBN 978-1538729892)
- Both Sides of the Glass: Paired Cocktails and Mocktails to Toast Any Taste (2025), (with Neil Patrick Harris) (ISBN 978-0593719862)

== See also ==
- LGBT culture in New York City
- List of LGBT people from New York City
- NYC Pride March
