= Keeping It 100! =

- RuPaul's Drag Race episode
- Episode no.: Season 8 Episode 1
- Presented by: RuPaul
- Original air date: March 7, 2016

Guest appearances
- Nicole Richie (guest judge); Mathu Andersen (photographer); BeBe Zahara Benet; Chad Michaels; Jinkx Monsoon; Latrice Royale; Morgan McMichaels; Raja; Raven; Shannel; Sharon Needles; Tyra Sanchez; Violet Chachki

Episode chronology
← Previous "Grand Finale"	Next → "Bitch Perfect"
- RuPaul's Drag Race season 8

"Keeping It 100!" is the first episode of the eighth season of the American television series RuPaul's Drag Race. It is the show's 100th episode overall, originally airing on March 7, 2016. The main challenge tasks contestants with recreating looks inspired by previous challenges on the show. Nicole Richie is a guest judge. Former contestant Morgan McMichaels makes a guest appearance, as do previous winners from the show as part of a photo shoot for the mini-challenge with Mathu Andersen. Former contestants Latrice Royale, Raven, and Shannel also make guest appearances, introducing themes on the runway.

Kim Chi wins the main challenge. Naysha Lopez is eliminated from the competition after placing in the bottom two and losing a lip-sync contest against Laila McQueen to "Applause" by Lady Gaga. The episode earned Zaldy a nomination in the Outstanding Costumes for a Variety, Nonfiction, or Reality Programming category at the 68th Primetime Emmy Awards.

== Episode ==
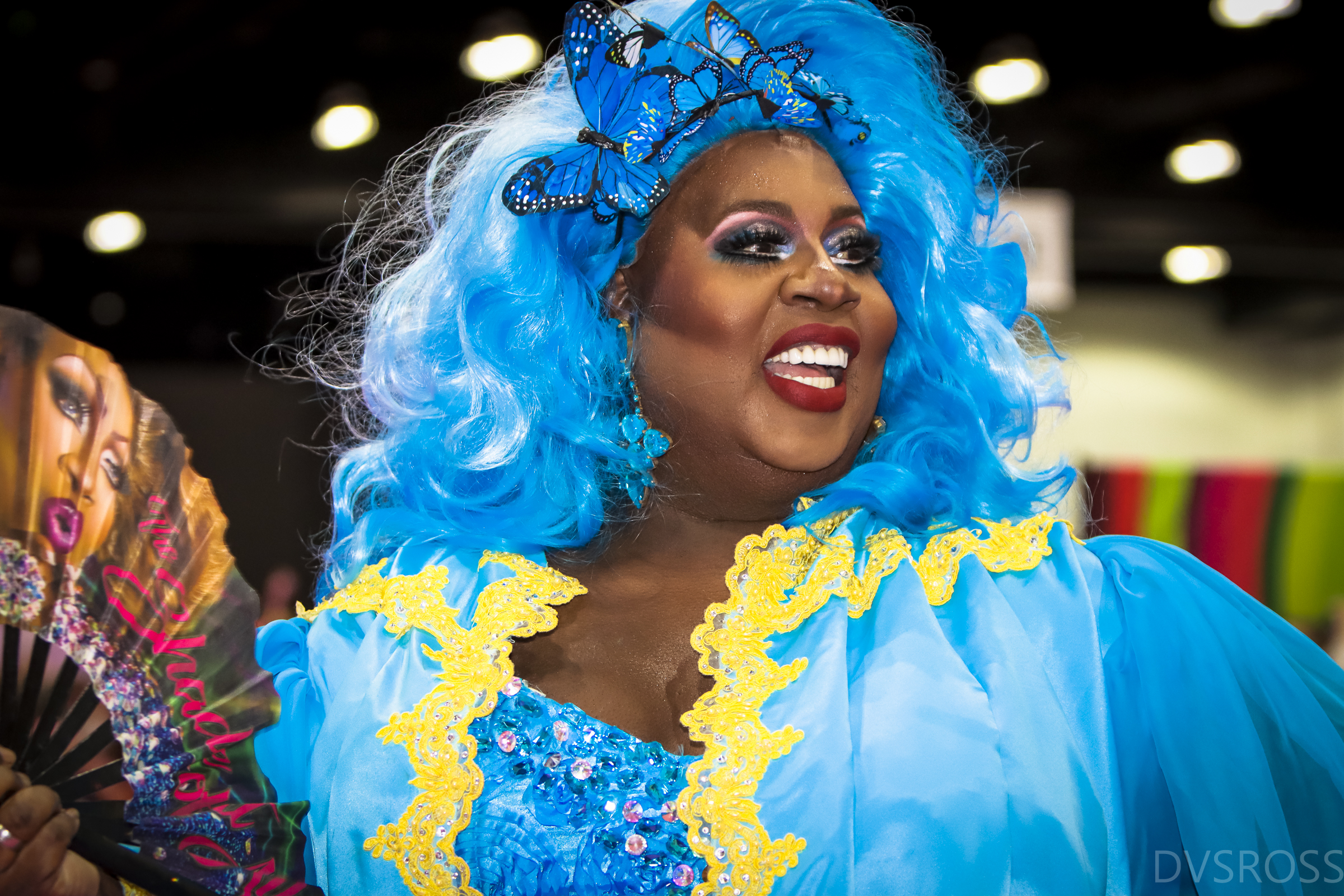
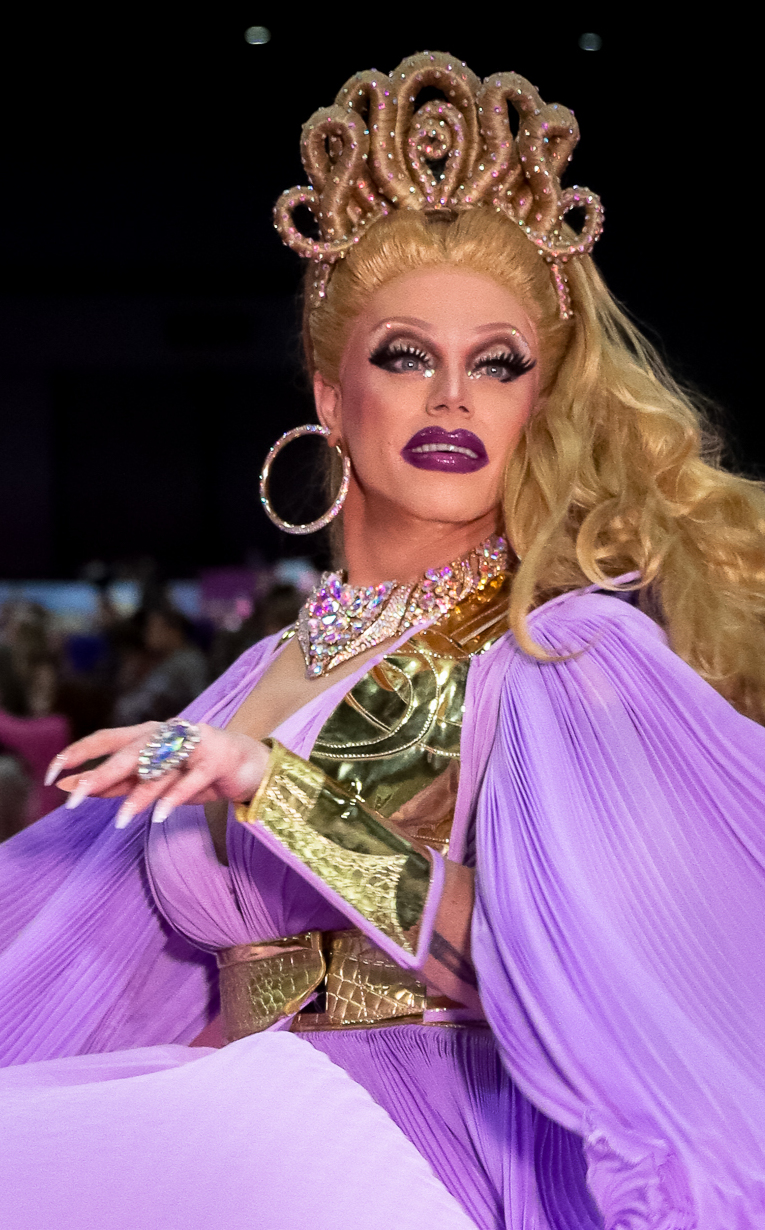
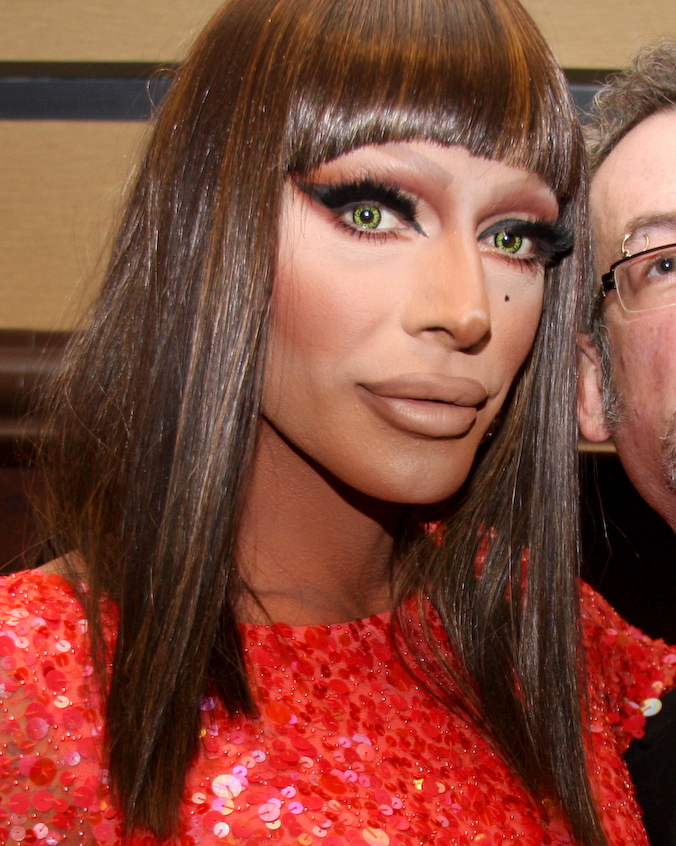
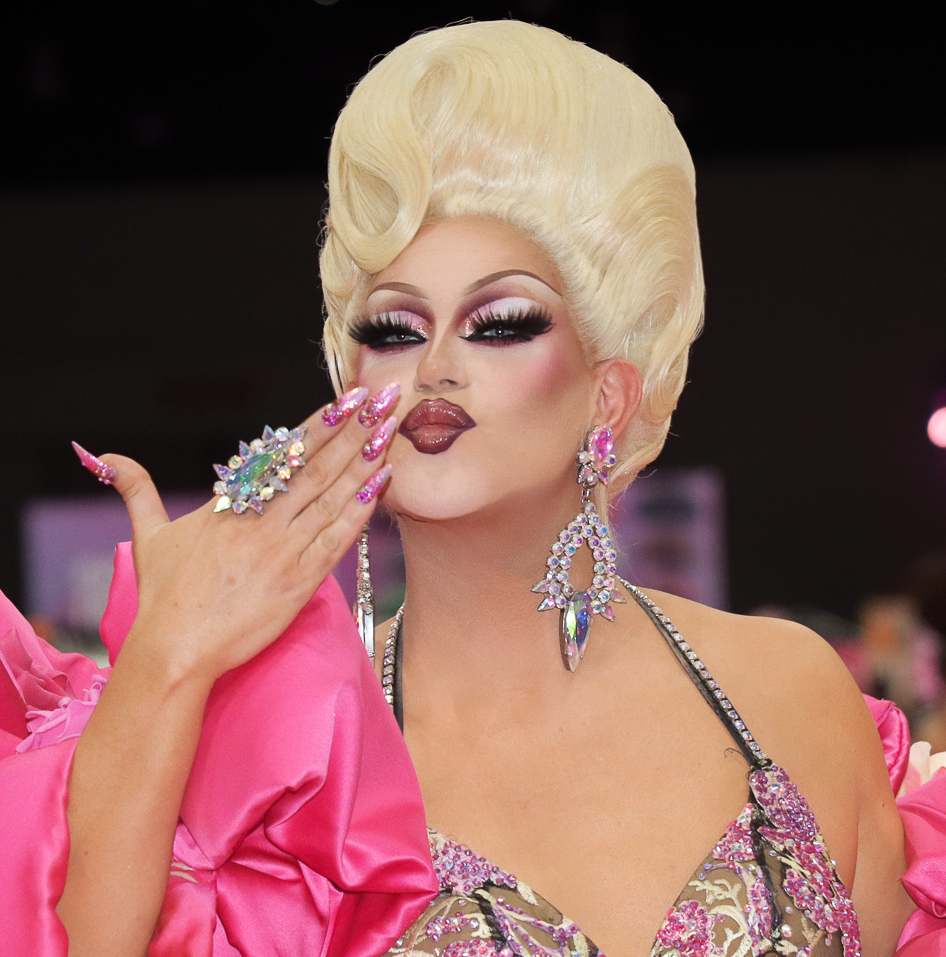
In addition to previous Drag Race winners, former contestants Latrice Royale (top left; pictured at RuPaul's DragCon LA in 2022), Morgan McMichaels (top right; pictured at the same event in 2023), Raven (bottom left; pictured in 2012), and Shannel (bottom right; pictured at RuPaul's DragCon LA in 2024) make guest appearances on the episode.

The season's twelve contestants enter the Werk Room one at a time. RuPaul greets the group and reveals the mini-challenge, which tasks contestants with posing in a photo shoot with Mathu Andersen featuring previous Drag Race winners. As the photo shoots conclude, the contestants get out of drag in the Werk Room. In the main stage area, RuPaul reveals the main challenge, which tasks contestants with recreating looks inspired by previous design challenges on the show. Morgan McMichaels makes a guest appearance to help determine which contestant would assign the themes. Robbie Turner is randomly selected. Presenters walk to runway to reveal the challenge themes:

- Shannel presents "Drag on a Dime" from season 1
- Latrice Royale presents "Pride Floats" from season 4
- Violet Chachki presents "Money Ball" from season 3
- Jinkx Monsoon presents "Sugar Ball" from season 5
- Tyra Sanchez presents "Glitter Ball" from season 6
- Chad Michaels presents "RuPocalyse Now!" from season 4
- Raja presents "Cake Couture" from season 3
- BeBe Zahara Benet presents "Hair Ball" from season 3
- guest Hello Kitty (as a mascot) presents "Hello Kitty Couture" from season 7
- Raven presents "Gone with the Window" from season 2
- members of the Pit Crew present "Queen Who Mopped Xmas" from season 3
- Sharon Needles presents "Bitch Ball" from season 4

Robbie Turner assigns the themes: "Drag on a Dime" for Naysha Lopez, "Money Ball" for Acid Betty, "Sugar Ball" for Cynthia Lee Fontaine, "Glitter Ball" for Chi Chi DeVayne, "RuPocalyse Now!" for Laila McQueen, "Cake Couture" for Thorgy Thor, "Hair Ball" for Kim Chi, "Hello Kitty Couture" for Dax ExclamationPoint, "Gone with the Window" for Bob the Drag Queen, and "Queen Who Mopped Xmas" for Derrick Barry. This unintentionally leaves Robbie Turner with the "Bitch Ball" theme. Back in the Werk Room, the contestants review the materials available to them and begin to create their looks. RuPaul returns and meets with the contestants individually to ask questions and offer advice.

On elimination day, the contestants finalize their looks in the Werk Room. Chi Chi DeVayne and Naysha Lopez discuss drag pageantry. Derrick Barry talks about impersonating Britney Spears. Kim Chi talks about hiding drag from her mother. Chi Chi DeVayne's outfit rips and she scrambles to repair the damage. On the main stage, RuPaul welcomes fellow judges Michelle Visage, Carson Kressley, and Ross Mathews, as well as guest judge Nicole Richie. The fashion show commences. After the contestants present their looks, the judges deliver their critiques, deliberate, then share the results. Kim Chi is declared the winner of the main challenge. Laila McQueen and Naysha Lopez place in the bottom two and face off in a lip-sync contest to "Applause" (2013) by Lady Gaga. Laila McQueens wins the lip-sync and Naysha Lopez is eliminated from the competition.

== Production and broadcast ==
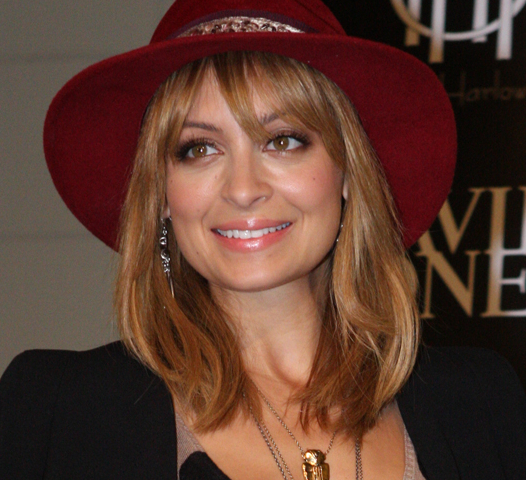
Nicole Richie (pictured in 2012) is a guest judge on the episode.

The episode originally aired on March 7, 2016. It honors the show's history.

Former winners appearing in the photo shoot include BeBe Zahara Benet, Tyra Sanchez, Raja, Sharon Needles, Chad Michaels, Jinkx Monsoon, and Violet Chachki. In lieu of Bianca Del Rio, there is also a circus clown.

=== Fashion ===
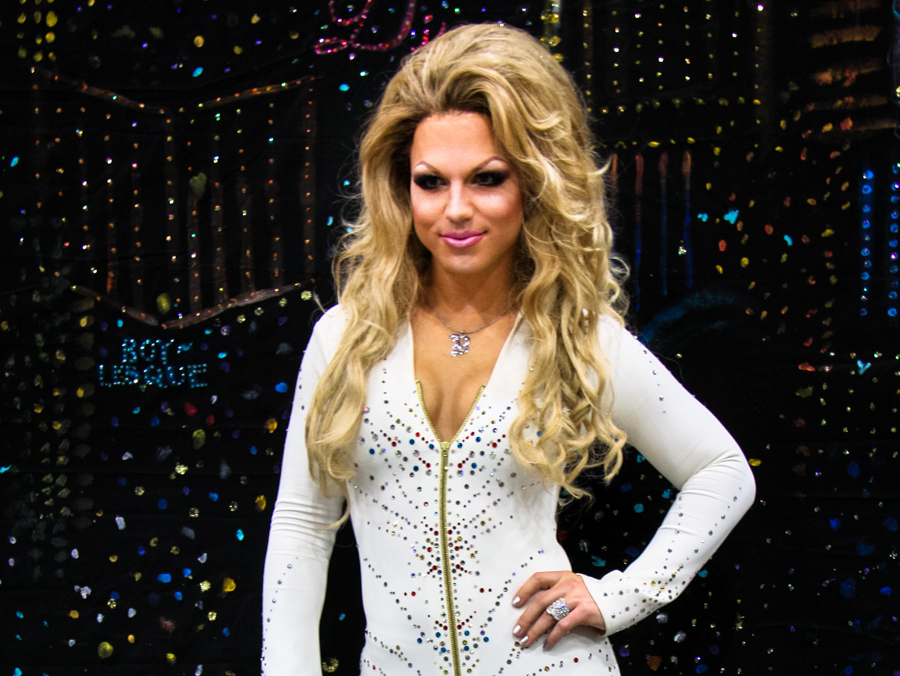
Derrick Barry's entrance look on the episode resembles singer Britney Spears; pictured is Derrick Barry with a similar look at RuPaul's DragCon LA in 2018.

For her entrance look, Naomi Smalls wears a short black dress, large earrings, and a blonde wig. Cynthia Lee Fontaine's dress is red and white and her jewelry is red. Dax ExclamationPoint resembles fictional Marvel Comics character Storm. Robbie Turner has a pink robe and a red wig. Kim Chi has a lavender dress and a matching wig with a gold headpiece. Thorgy wears a gold-and-red outfit and a red wig. Bob the Drag Queen has a black-and-white outfit and black high-heeled shoes. Laila McQueen has a Beetlejuice-inspired black-and-white outfit and a purple wig. Chi Chi DeVayne has a black dress and matching gloves. Resembling Spears, Derrick Barry wears a white outfit and a blonde wig. For his Werk Room entrance look, RuPaul has a green-and-white suit, a blue dress shirt, and an orange hat.

For the main stage, RuPau wears a pink dress with white polka dots and a blonde wig. For the fashion show, Acid Betty's dress is made of fake dollar bills. Bob the Drag Queen's dress is made of multiple patterns. Dax ExclamationPoint wears a short pink dress and she carries a stuffed toy. Naysha Lopez has a gold corset and a matching gold headpiece. Kim Chi has wigs on her shoulders and ears as a headpiece. She wears many necklaces and a blonde wig. Cynthia Lee Fontaine has a corset covered in candy. She removes her pink dress on the runway. Naomi Smalls wears a short gold dress and carries a blue float. Chi Chi DeVayne wears a silver dress and carries a disco ball. Thorgy Thor's dress is red and she wears a blonde wig. She carries a tray with a piece of cake and an oversized candle. Robbie Turner's dress is red and white; she has a blonde wig and walks with a white poodle. Derrick Barry has a red outfit and a blonde wig. She has Christmas-themed accessories and removes her skirt to reveal a wreath underneath. Laila McQueen has a jacket, black boots with a matching hat, and a red wig.

== Reception ==
Oliver Sava of The A.V. Club gave the episode a rating of 'A'. Bernardo Sim selected "Keeping It 100!" for the eighth season in Screen Rant's 2019 list of each season's best episodes. Sim said the episode is "fierce" and "stood the test of time". Sam Brooks ranked "Applause" number 153 in The Spinoff's 2019 "definitive ranking" of the show's 162 lip-syncs to date, writing, "To speak in Drag Race vernacular, Naysha brings Soccer Mom Realness. Which is to bring up another issue that often comes up with lip-syncs: sometimes a queen completely misses the energy of the song and approaches it in the wrong way. It might feel right from the inside, who can say, but to watch it can be painful." Brooks continued, "Naysha brings a handing-out-orange-quarters kind of energy to Lady Gaga's most hi-NRG single, and it does not work. On the other hand, Laila occasionally connects with the song, but not in the way it needs." Kevin O'Keeffe ranked the episode seventh in Xtra Magazine's 2020 list of the ten best episodes of all time.

The episode earned American fashion designer Zaldy a nomination in the Outstanding Costumes for a Variety, Nonfiction, or Reality Programming category at the 68th Primetime Emmy Awards.
