= Glitter Ball =

- RuPaul's Drag Race episode
- Episode no.: Season 6 Episode 11
- Original air date: April 28, 2014

Guest appearances
- Khloe Kardashian; Bob Mackie

Episode chronology
← Previous "Drag My Wedding"	Next → "Sissy That Walk"

"Glitter Ball" is the eleventh episode of the sixth season of the American television series RuPaul's Drag Race. It originally aired on April 28, 2014. The episode's main challenge tasks contestants with presenting three looks for a fashion show. Khloé Kardashian and Bob Mackie are guest judges. Adore Delano wins the episode's main challenge. BenDeLaCreme is eliminated from the competition after placing in the bottom two of the main challenge and losing a lip-sync contest against Darienne Lake to "Stronger (What Doesn't Kill You)" by Kelly Clarkson.

== Episode ==
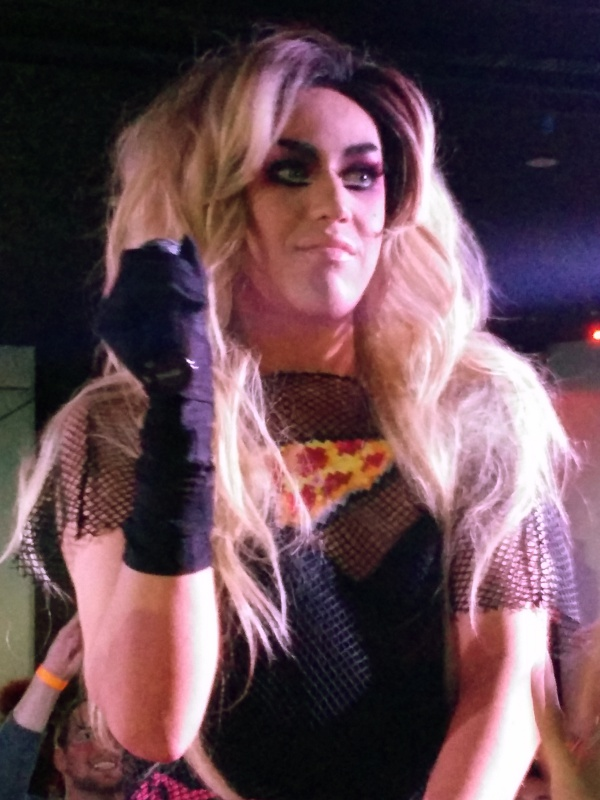
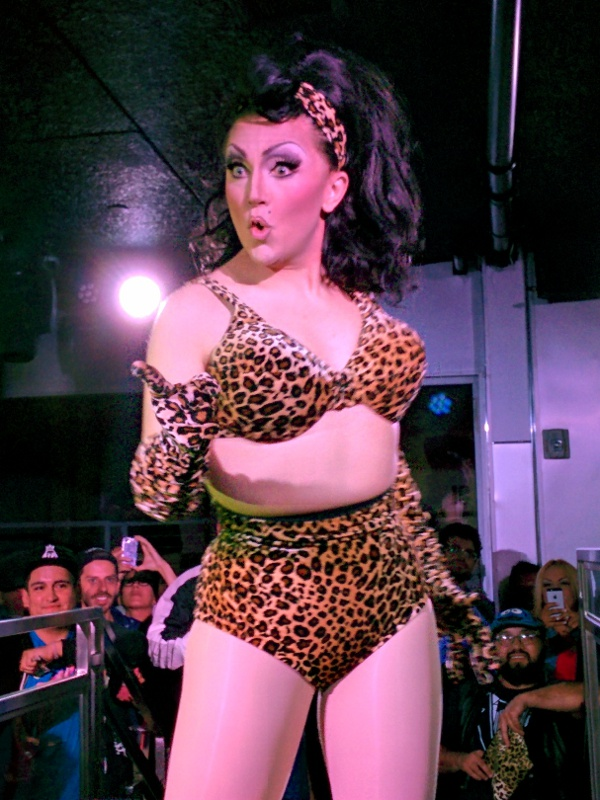
Adore Delano (top), who wins the episode's main challenge, and BenDeLaCreme (bottom), who is eliminated from the competition, performing in San Francisco in 2014.

The contestants return to the Werk Room after Joslyn Fox's elimination on the previous episode. On a new day, RuPaul greets the group and reveals the mini-challenge, which tasks the contestants with using puppets to impersonate a fellow competitor. Members of the Pit Crew enter and the contestants draw puppets randomly. After creating puppets, the impersonations commence. Adore Delano impersonates BenDeLaCreme, Bianca Del Rio impersonates Adore Delano, Darienne Lake impersonates Courtney Act, Courtney Act impersonates Darienne Lake, and BenDeLaCreme impersonates Bianca Del Rio. RuPaul declares BenDeLaCreme the winner of the mini-challenge.

RuPaul reveals the main challenge, which tasks the contestants with creating three looks for the Glitter Ball. The runway categories are "Banjee Girl Bling", "Platinum Card Executive Realness", and "Dripping in Jewels Eleganza". Some materials and gemstones are made available to the competitors. For winning the mini-challenge, BenDeLaCreme gets to pair jewels with contestants: Adore Delano has diamond, BenDeLaCreme has rose quartz, Bianca Del Rio has sapphire, Courtney Act has ruby, and Darienne Lake has topaz. RuPaul returns to the Werk Room to meet with contestants individually and offer advice. He reveals that Khloé Kardashian and Bob Mackie are guest judges. RuPaul also reveals that contestants must perform an opening number, with choreography led by BenDeLaCreme. The contestants rehearse choreography on the main stage, then make final preparations in the Werk Room for the fashion show.

On the main stage, RuPaul welcomes fellow judges Michelle Visage and Santino Rice, as well as the guest judges. The contestants perform the opening number, then the fashion show commences. RuPaul asks the contestants to share who they think should be eliminated from the competition. All of the contestants select Darienne Lake, including herself. The judges deliver their critiques, deliberate, then share the results with the group. Adore Delano and Bianca Del Rio receive positive critiques, and Adore Delano wins the challenge. BenDeLaCreme, Courtney Act, and Darienne Lake receive negative critiques, and Courtney Act is deemed safe. BenDeLaCreme and Darienne Lake place in the bottom and face off in a lip-sync contest to "Stronger (What Doesn't Kill You)" (2012) by Kelly Clarkson. Darienne Lake wins the lip-sync and BenDeLaCreme is eliminated from the competition.

== Production and broadcast ==
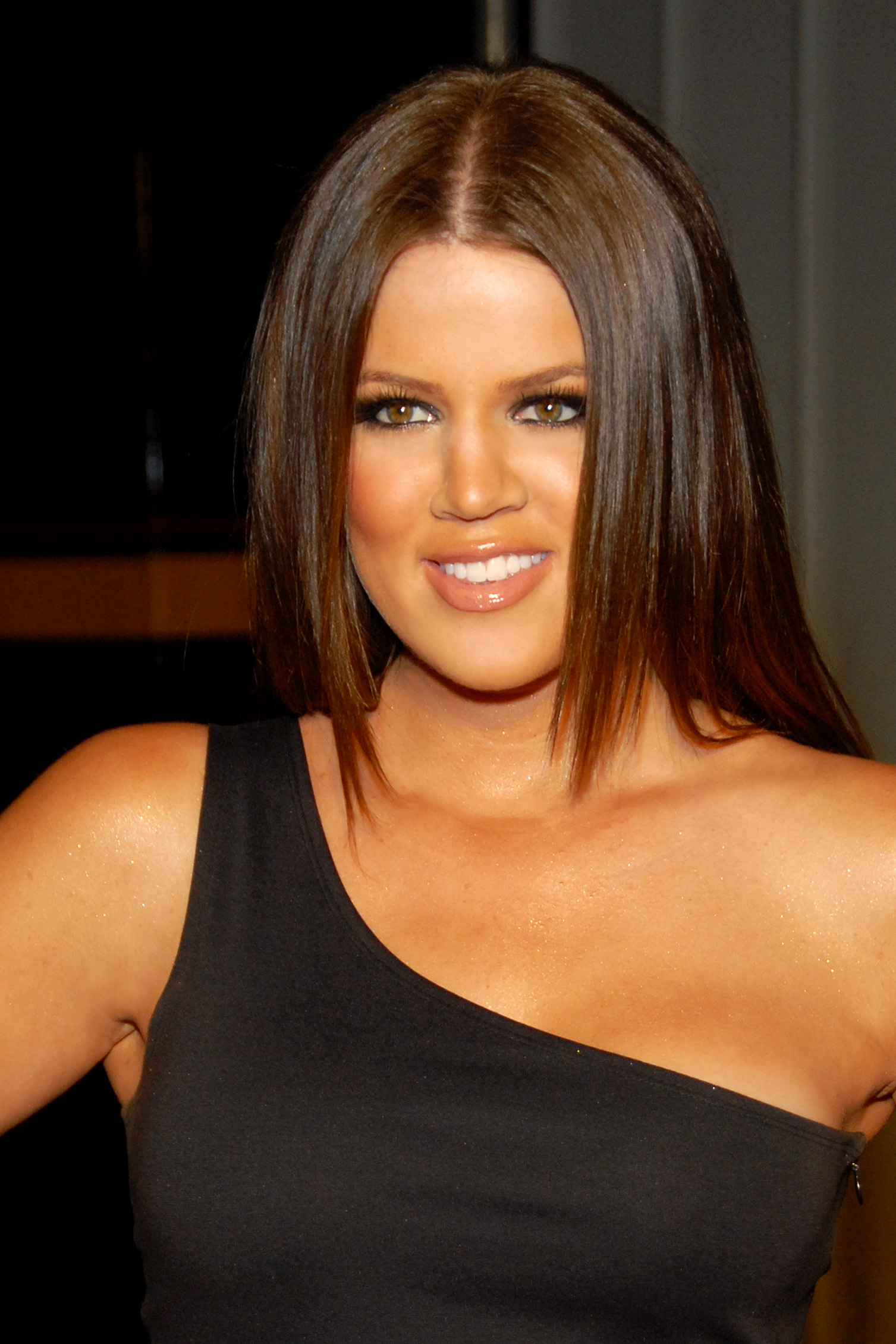
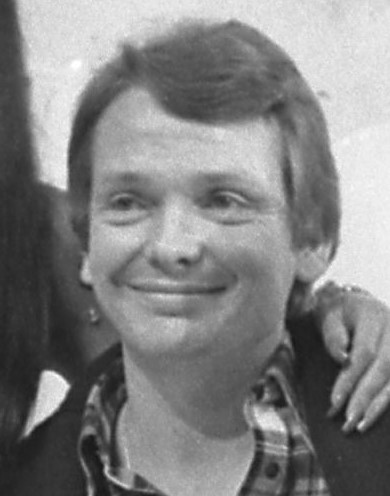
Khloé Kardashian (top, pictured in 2009) and fashion designer Bob Mackie (bottom, pictured in 1975) are guest judges.

The episode originally aired on April 28, 2014. Previously, Kardashian and Mackie were guest judges on the sixth season's second episode ("RuPaul's Big Opening: Part 2") and the fifth season's eleventh episode ("Sugar Ball"), respectively.

"Glitter Ball" is referenced in the eighth season episode "Keeping It 100!".

=== Fashion ===
RuPaul wears a pink dress for the main stage.

For the fashion show's "Banjee Girl Bling" category, BenDeLaCreme wears a short denim outfit and has an orange boa. Adore Delano has tall boots and a pink jacket. Bianca Del Rio has gold jewelry and large earrings. Darienne Lake has a colorful outfit and a blue wig. Courtney Act has a flannel shirt and denim shorts.

For "Platinum Card Executive Realness", BenDeLaCreme has a black and pink outfit with a headpiece. Adore Delano has a white dress shirt and black pants. Bianca Del Rio has a light blue suit and a red wig. Darienne Lake has a sequined top. Courtney Act has a short blonde wig and pretends to talk on a mobile phone.

For "Dripping in Jewels Eleganza", BenDeLaCreme has a can-can- and pin-up-inspired look. Adore Delano's dress is white and she has a matching wig. Bianca Del Rio wears a blue gown with a matching fascinator. Darienne Lake's dress is brown. Courtney Act has a red dress and matching accessories.

== Reception ==
Oliver Sava of The A.V. Club gave the episode a rating of 'A-'. In 2021, Josh Milton of PinkNews called "Glitter Ball" the season's worst episode. Brett White ranked Darienne Lake's runway look in Decider's 2022 list of the show's "pride looks" (rainbow theme). White said, "You can't fault Darienne Lake for bringing late '90s hacker/raver glitz to the Banjee Girl Bling category, because Adore Delano was the only one who understood the assignment. And honestly, you gotta give Darienne some cred for matching the hue of that electric blue wig to her makeup and the jumpsuit's racing stripe. The details are there even if the look is at the wrong function."

Chiffon Dior of Werrrk said, "based on the outrage online, most people felt like Ru sent the wrong queen home". Roy Ward of Vada Magazine wrote, "The shocking elimination of Seattle's beloved BenDeLaCreme ... hit the Drag Race fandom pretty hard this year." A writer for IndieWire ranked "Stronger" performance ninth in a list of the season's lip-syncs and wrote, "Darienne jumping around with a droopy, glittery peehole. Ben waving those spaghetti arms. Kelly Clarkson. It was all pretty weak." Timothy Allen included BenDeLaCreme's elimination in Queerty's 2014 list of the show's "most shocking and controversial moments". Allen said, "This may be THE most controversial elimination in the show's history and it has caused a massive uproar on social media." Kevin O'Keeffe ranked "Stronger" number 79 in INTO Magazine's 2018 "definitive ranking" of the show's lip-syncs to date. Sam Brooks ranked the contest number 131 in The Spinoff's 2019 "definitive ranking" of the show's 162 lip-syncs to date. In 2020, Andy Swift of TVLine wrote, "while DeLa was clearly the 'Stronger' competitor, RuPaul declared Darienne the victor, setting off an immediate social media firestorm". Sam Damshenas ranked BenDeLaCreme's loss third in Gay Times's 2021 list of the show's ten "most controversial" eliminations, writing: "This feels like the first Drag Race elimination that garnered significant uproar from the fandom. When BenDeLaCreme was eliminated at the top five by frenemy Darienne Lake ... fans launched a petition asking RuPaul to bring Ben back into the competition, not realising the entire show was already filmed".
