= Jinny Jacinto =

Canadian contortionist

- Born: Jinny Jessica Jacinto; May 8, 1976 (age 48)
- Occupation: Contortionist

Jinny Jessica Jacinto (born May 8, 1976) is a Canadian contortionist, known for her work with the Cirque du Soleil, her television appearances and her role in the film Satie and Suzanne.

== Early life ==
Jacinto's parents were Peruvian by birth.

== Performances as a contortionist ==
Jacinto was a member of the Cirque du Soleil as one of four 12 to 14-year-old girls working in a contortionist troupe. She said that to perform as a contortionist "You just lie down on your stomach, bring your legs over your head, lift up your chest and you smile."

The four girls won a gold medal at the Festival Mondial Du Cirque De Demain in Paris in 1990.

In the dance show Tono, put on by the Ontario-based Red Sky Performance at the Coups de théâtre festival, reviewer Kathryn Greenaway described Jacinto's opening performance, which finished with her turning to "reveal a slender, elegant horse skull delicately balanced on her forearm" as "breathtaking". Choreographer Laronde said the casting of Jacinto was to "convey the otherworldliness of the shaman", continuing "when the shaman dreams, they often dream upside down, whereas normal people dream right-side up."

In 2004, Jacinto participated in an art installation by director Paulette Phillips entitled The Secret Life of Criminals. The piece was inspired by a police investigation into a woman's death. Phillips said the performance of Jacinto, who could "turn her body into a pretzel" and was "constantly in motion", suggested "the unknowable presented under a scientific gaze—Heisenberg's Uncertainty Principle at play, suggesting that the observer affects the observed."

== Television and theatre appearances ==
In 2001, Jacinto was cast in Robert Lepage's production of Zulu Time in R for Romeo. The production, which looked at the issues surrounding terrorists and air travel, was scheduled to open in September in New York and was cancelled following the September 11 attacks in the US.

In 2004, she appeared as part of the stage production Variété in a rag-doll performance.

Jacinto appeared in an advertising campaign for Residence Inn by Marriott created by McGarryBowen of New York. In the ad, Jacinto takes an apple from a bag on the kitchen counter, giving it a tennis serve into the air and effortlessly flipping herself into a hand stand on the counter, then catching the apple on her upper foot, all to illustrate in-room grocery delivery.
