= Drag My Wedding =

- RuPaul's Drag Race episode
- Episode no.: Season 6 Episode 10
- Presented by: RuPaul
- Original air date: April 21, 2014

Guest appearances
- David Burtka; Neil Patrick Harris

Episode chronology
← Previous "Queens of Talk"	Next → "Glitter Ball"

"Drag My Wedding" is the tenth episode of the sixth season of the American television series RuPaul's Drag Race. It originally aired on April 21, 2014. The episode's main challenge tasks the contestants with giving drag makeovers to heterosexual grooms for on-stage weddings with their spouses. Spouses David Burtka and Neil Patrick Harris are guest judges.

Bianca Del Rio wins the episode's mini-challenge and main challenge. Joslyn Fox is eliminated from the competition after placing in the bottom and losing a lip-sync contest against Adore Delano to "Think" by Aretha Franklin.

== Episode ==
For the episode's mini-challenge, the contestants are tasked with creating abstract paintings using their bodies in honor of same-sex marriage. Bianca Del Rio wins the mini-challenge. For the main challenge, the contestants are tasked with giving drag makeovers to heterosexual grooms for on-stage weddings with their partners. Spouses David Burtka and Neil Patrick Harris are guest judges. BenDeLaCreme and Bianca Del Rio receive positive critiques, and Bianca Del Rio wins the challenge. Adore Delano, Darienne Lake, and Joslyn Fox receive negative critiques, and Darienne Lake is deemed safe. Adore Delano and Joslyn Fox place in the bottom and face off in a lip-sync to "Think" (1968) by Aretha Franklin. Adore Delano wins the lip-sync and Joslyn Fox is eliminated from the competition.

== Production and broadcast ==
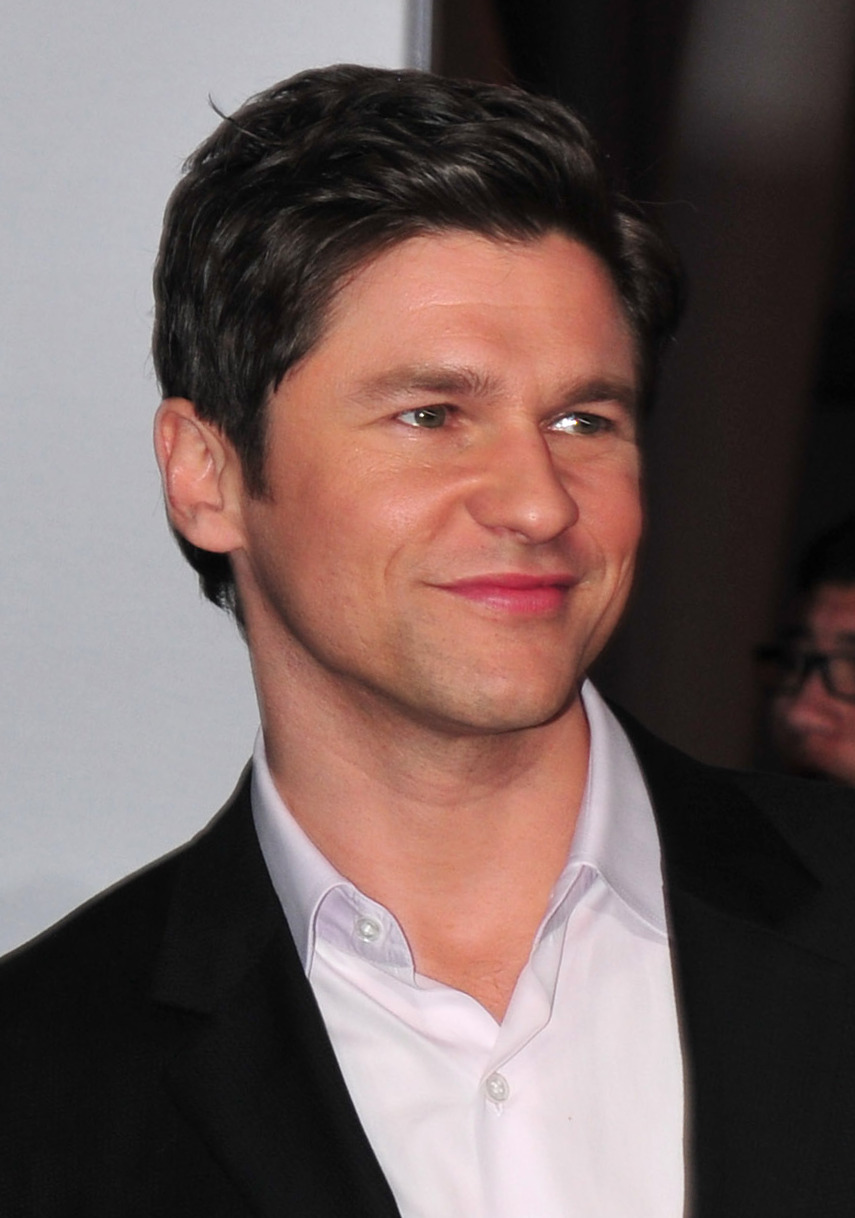
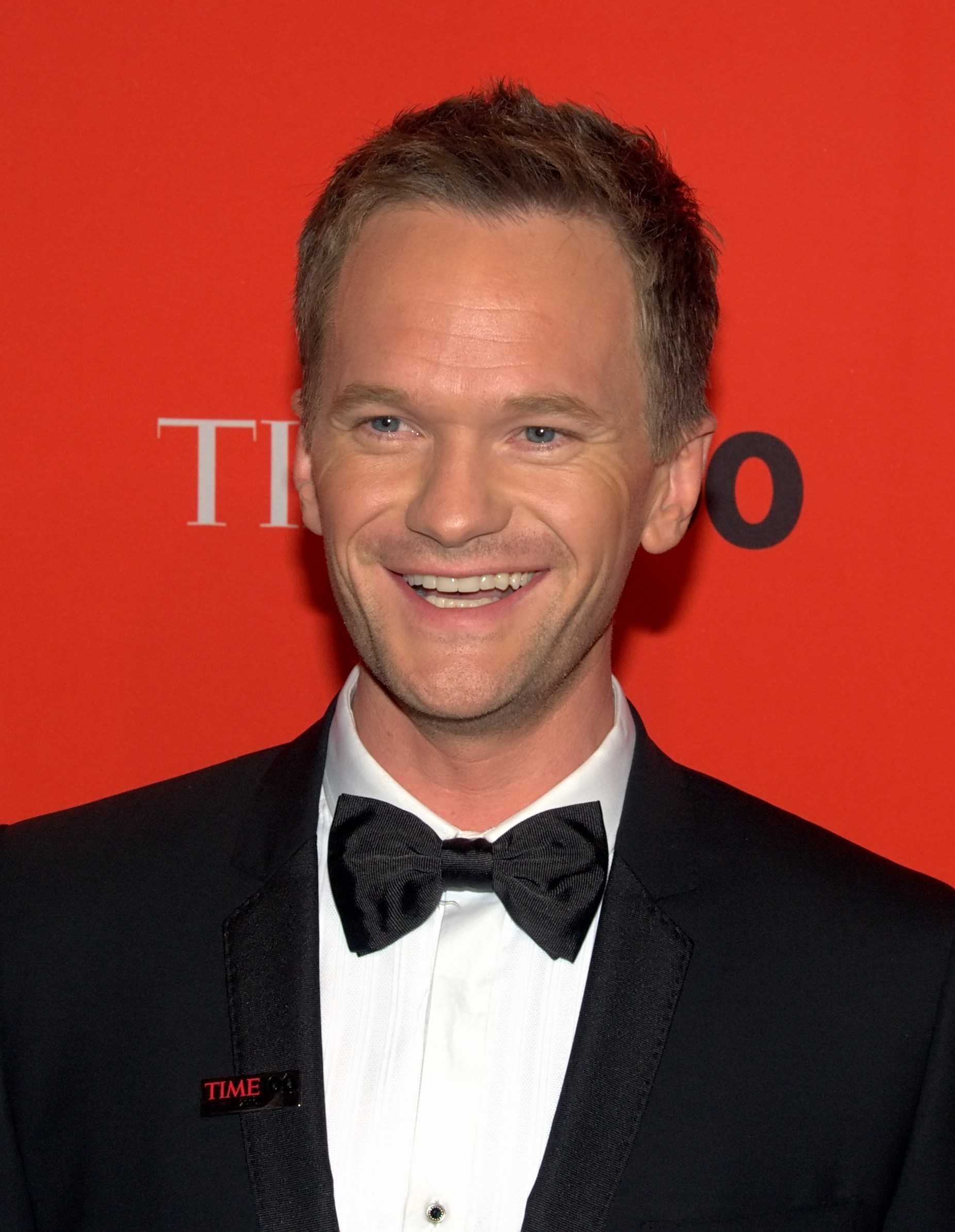
Spouses David Burtka (left) and Neil Patrick Harris (right) are guest judges.

The episode originally aired on April 21, 2014.

Anneliese Cooper of Bustle said, "Wives sported some fly Marlene-Dietrich-circa- Morocco -style tuxes, and the gents were made up by our beloved contestants." Joslyn Fox's groom was reluctant to get a makeover.

== Reception ==
Oliver Sava of The A.V. Club gave the episode a rating of 'B-'. Gregory Rosebrugh of IndieWire said it "was a bit of a dud compared to previous episodes". Victor D. Infante of the Telegram & Gazette called the lip-sync contest "fierce". Contrastingly, Jeremy Feist of Xtra Magazine said the lip-sync was "not a great performance". Kevin O'Keeffe ranked the "Think" performance number 46 in INTO Magazine's 2018 "definitive ranking" of the show's lip-sync contests to date. Sam Brooks ranked the performance number 127 in The Spinoff's 2019 "definitive ranking" of the show's 162 lip-syncs to date, writing: "Two young high energy queens are unfortunately given the task of lip-syncing to a soulful, high energy Aretha Franklin song. There are no survivors."
