= Volta (Cirque du Soleil) =

Contemporary circus show

- Logo for Cirque du Soleil's Volta
- Company: Cirque du Soleil
- Genre: Contemporary circus
- Show type: Touring show
- Date of premiere: April 20, 2017 (Montreal)
- Final show: March 8th, 2020 (Los Angeles, CA)

Creative team
- Writer and Director: Bastien Alexandre
- Director of Creation: Jean Guibert
- Set Design: Bruce Rodgers
- Choreographer: Julie Perron
- Lighting Designer: Martin Labrecque
- Costume Designer: Zaldy Goco
- Composer: M83
- Video Content Designer: Thibaut Duverneix
- Sound Designer: Jean-Michel Caron
- Props Designer: Anne Séguin Poirier
- Acrobatic Performance Designer: Philippe Aubertin; Rob Bollinger
- Acrobatic Equipment and Rigging Designer: Jaque Paquin
- Makeup Designer: Eleni Uranis
- Character’s guide: Manon Beaudoin

Other information
- Preceded by: Séptimo Día - No Descansaré (2017)
- Succeeded by: Crystal (2017)
- Official website

Volta was a touring circus show by the Cirque du Soleil and was based on extreme sports; the principal character is a game-show host named Waz.

It is the company's 41st production since 1984, and its 18th show presented under the Big Top. The director of creation is Jean Guibert; Bastien Alexandre is writer and director.

== Story ==
According to the booklet for the show's soundtrack, Waz is the host of a game show, Quid Pro Quo, where people called Greys compete to become Elites. He lost touch with his inner soul in the pursuit of fame. After meeting Ela, the chief of a group called Free Spirits, Waz sets out on a journey he does not expect. Throughout his adventure, Waz becomes enlightened by memories from his childhood as he encounters the Free Spirits who open the doors to the inner soul that Waz has long kept shut and find his free.

== Acts ==
Acts include:

- Mr. Wow Show: Rope skipping (and more)
- Precision walk, roller skates, and hand to hand on unicycle
- Acro lamp
- Trampowall
- Flatland BMX & ballet duo
- Swiss rings/bungee
- Acrobatic ladders
- Shape diving
- Hair suspension
- Aerial straps
- Contemporary dance
- BMX

=== Acts in rotation ===
- Aerial hoop (in rotation with hair suspension)

=== Retired acts ===
- Rope duo
- Tightwire
- Trials bike
- B-ball
- Parkour
- Baton twirling

== Music ==
Anthony Gonzalez, from the French music band M83, was asked to write the musical score. The soundtrack was released on 20 September 2017 in digital format and on streaming services.

=== Vocalists ===
- Darius Harper - From April 2017 (Montreal) to March 8, 2020 (Los Angeles, CA)
- Camilla Bäckman - From April 2017 (Montreal) to March 8, 2020 (Los Angeles, CA)

== Incidents ==
=== Death of Yann Arnaud ===
On March 17, 2018, aerialist Yann Arnaud died of injuries sustained when he fell 20 feet during an aerial straps performance in Tampa Bay, Florida. Planned performances in Tampa Bay and New Jersey were cancelled.

== Tour ==
The show began its Grand Chapiteau tour in North America in its newly designed white and grey big top designed to help reduce environmental impact by reducing heat penetration into the tent.

A show in Redmond was cancelled due to an equipment malfunction.

== Impact of the COVID-19 pandemic ==
In March 2020, Cirque du Soleil suspended all of its 44 active shows worldwide due to the COVID-19 pandemic, which brought the company into a state of financial collapse with a debt of over $1 billion. Even though the company was able to come back and reopen many of its shows, other shows, including Axel, Totem, and Volta were permanently closed.

Volta performed its last show in Los Angeles, CA on March 8, 2020.
