= Zaldy =

American fashion designer

- Born: Salvador Goco; 1966 (age 59–60); Cheshire, Connecticut, U.S.
- Education: Parsons School of Design; Fashion Institute of Technology (BFA)
- Awards: Emmy Award for Outstanding Costumes for a Variety, Nonfiction, or Reality Programming (2017, 2018, 2019)

Zaldy Goco (born 1966), also known mononymously as Zaldy, is a Filipino-American fashion designer. In 1995, he was featured as a model in a British television advertisement for Levi's. Zaldy was named one of Out magazine's Out 100 in 2006. He was the costume designer for Michael Jackson's This Is It concerts, Lady Gaga's Monster Ball Tour, and Britney Spears's Femme Fatale Tour. Zaldy designed the costumes for the Cirque du Soleil shows Michael Jackson: The Immortal World Tour, Michael Jackson: One, and Volta. He was also the head designer for Gwen Stefani's fashion line L.A.M.B. He has received five Emmy nominations, winning in 2017, 2018, and 2019 for Outstanding Costumes for a Variety, Nonfiction, or Reality Programming due to his work on RuPaul's Drag Race.

== Early life ==
Zaldy was born in Cheshire, Connecticut. His first name is Salvador, but his parents called him Zaldy from birth. His grandmother sparked his interest in fashion.

== Education ==
Zaldy studied at Parsons School of Design in the 1980s but completed his education in 1990 at the Fashion Institute of Technology.

== Modeling ==
Zaldy walked the runways for notable designers such as Thierry Mugler, Jean-Paul Gaultier, and Vivienne Westwood, modeling women's clothing. He also modeled men's clothing in a Japanese advertising campaign for Paul Smith. In 1995, Zaldy, appearing in drag, starred in a Levi's television commercial with the song Tune On, Tune In, Cop Out, which was banned in the United States and aired only late at night in the United Kingdom. This Levi's advertisement was noted for marking a rise in the prominence of drag in pop culture.

== Photoshoots and red carpets ==
Various celebrities have worn Zaldy's clothing in notable photoshoots or on red carpets. Beyoncé wore a Zaldy dress on the cover of the November 2005 issue of Vanity Fair. Film producer Lisa Maria Falcone, producer for 127 Hours, wore a Zaldy dress to the 83rd Academy Awards. Kesha wore a Zaldy dress to the 2012 MTV Video Music Awards. Chloe x Halle both wore Zaldy to the 2016 BET Hip Hop Awards; their stylist for the event, Zerina Akers, said: "I always like to use young, new talent, because I feel like we see so much of the same thing in fashion and on the red carpet. I thought it was fresh."

== Stage and concert performances ==
Zaldy designed his first stage costume for Lady Miss Kier, the singer of Deee-Lite, who saw him at a club wearing a mirror-studded catsuit and asked him to make her a similar outfit. His first time designing stage outfits for an entire musical group was for Scissor Sisters' 2006 performance at the Coachella Valley Music and Arts Festival. He later designed the costumes for the Japanese band Exile. Zaldy was hired by Michael Jackson to create costumes for the This Is It concert residency, that wound up not happening due to Jackson's death. He would eventually collaborate with Cirque du Soleil in two productions centered around Jackson's music, Michael Jackson: The Immortal World Tour and Michael Jackson: One, as well as the touring circus show Volta.

== RuPaul ==
In the late 1980s, Zaldy met the American drag queen RuPaul at a nightclub in Union Square, Manhattan. He has been designing his drag outfits since 1992. RuPaul wore Zaldy's outfits in the music video for his 1993 single "Supermodel (You Better Work)" and the Netflix series AJ and the Queen.

Zaldy also designed RuPaul's suit for the 2019 Met Gala.

=== RuPaul's Drag Race ===
Zaldy designs the gowns for RuPaul on RuPaul's Drag Race. He works with three other team members and an assortment of other craftspeople, including painters, beaders, and graphic designers.

For his work on Drag Race, Zaldy has received five Primetime Emmy Award nominations, winning three times in the category of Outstanding Costumes for a Variety, Nonfiction, or Reality Programming. He was first nominated for the 68th Primetime Creative Arts Emmy Awards for the season 8 premiere, "Keeping It 100!" He received a second nomination, alongside Perry Meek, for the 69th Primetime Creative Arts Emmy Awards for the season 9 premiere, "Oh. My. Gaga!" Zaldy and Meek won this Emmy. He received a third nomination in this category in 2018 for the season 10 premiere "10s Across the Board". In 2019, he won an Emmy for the episode "Trump: The Rusical" alongside Art Conn, who designed Michelle Visage's outfit.

Zaldy appeared as a guest judge alongside Kesha on season 9, episode "Makeovers: Crew Better Work," and made a guest appearance in the season 12, episode "You Don't Know Me." He also appeared as a guest judge on the RuPaul's Drag Race All Stars season 6, episode "Show Up Queen".

Year	Award	Category	Show	Episode	Result	Ref.
2016	Primetime Emmy Award	Outstanding Costumes for a Variety, Nonfiction, or Reality Programming	RuPaul's Drag Race	Keeping It 100!"	Nominated	
2017	Primetime Emmy Award	Outstanding Costumes for a Variety, Nonfiction, or Reality Programming	RuPaul's Drag Race	"Oh. My. Gaga!" (Shared with Perry Meek)	Won	
2018	Primetime Emmy Award	Outstanding Costumes for a Variety, Nonfiction, or Reality Programming	RuPaul's Drag Race	"10s Across the Board"	Won	
2019	Primetime Emmy Award	Outstanding Costumes for a Variety, Nonfiction, or Reality Programming	RuPaul's Drag Race	"Trump: The Rusical" (shared with Art Conn)	Won	
2020	Primetime Emmy Award	Outstanding Costumes for a Variety, Nonfiction, or Reality Programming	RuPaul's Drag Race	"I'm That Bitch"	Nominated	

== Works cited ==
- Carter, Lee (June 3, 2007). "Everyone loves Zaldy". The Independent. No. 901. pp. 52–53.
- Feldman, Jenny (July 2005). "Notes From the Underground: Zaldy Goco Spins a Darkly Beautiful Signature Collection of Victorian-Goth Coats and Dresses". Elle. Vol. 20, no. 11. p. 38.
- Kedves, Jan (2013). "Zaldy: Costume Designer, New York & Las Vegas". Talking Fashion: From Raf Simons to Nick Knight in their own Words. Munich: Prestel. pp. 116–121. ISBN 978-3-7913-4823-0.
- Nepales, Ruben V. (October 31, 2009). "Spotlight on two Fil-Ams in 'This Is it'". Philippine Daily Inquirer. p. G1.
- Van Meter, William (September 7, 2014). "Zaldy, Onetime Club Kid, Model and Costumer to Pop Stars, Returns to Fashion Week". The New York Times. Vol. 163, no. 56, 617. p. 18ST.

== General references ==
- Amed, Imran (January 21, 2010). "Zaldy Goco talks about designing for Michael Jackson and Lady Gaga, Part I". The Business of Fashion.
- Amed, Imran (January 21, 2010). "Zaldy Goco talks about designing for Michael Jackson and Lady Gaga, Part II". The Business of Fashion.
- Chermayeff, Catherine; David, Jonathan; Richardson, Nan (1995). "Mathu and Zaldy". Drag Diaries. Chronicle Books. pp. 62–74. ISBN 9780811808958.
- Gardner, Chris (June 7, 2018). "Inside 'RuPaul's Drag Race' Costume Exhibit Opening With Fan Favorites, Michelle Visage". The Hollywood Reporter.
- Geiger, Daniel (February 3, 2014). "Lady Gaga's designer opens SoHo HQ". Crain's New York Business. Vol. 30, no. 5. p. 20.
- Kaplan, Julee (5 February 2008). "Zaldy Goes Contemporary for Everlast". WWD.
- Lee, Ashley (June 2, 2013). "Making Zombies With 'LED Guts' for Cirque's 'Michael Jackson One'". The Hollywood Reporter.
- McDonald, Patrick (July 28, 2003). "High Brow: Interview with Zaldy". Paper. Archived from the original on November 30, 2020.
- Mellors, Coco (October 20, 2009). "The fashion designer pop stars love: Zaldy". W Magazine.
- Peng, Elizabeth (May 2, 2016). "This Is What It Looks Like When Artificial Intelligence Designs a Dress for the Met Gala". Vogue.'
- Pignatelli, Benedetta (August 19, 2015). "Susanne Bartsch. Amazing creativity". Italian Vogue. No. 780. p. 134.
- Shellhammer, Bradford (September 16, 2005). "Love. Angel. Music. Zaldy". HX Magazine. No. 732. p. 18. ISSN 1524-0339.
- WWD Staff (September 11, 2014). "Zaldy RTW Spring 2015". WWD.
- "New York toasts Pinoy fashion designer". Good News Pilipinas. Archived from the original on May 13, 2007.
