= Leilani Franco =

British contortionist

- Born: Leilani Lemuela Franco; 9 April 1986
- Other names: Lucky Franco, Luna Luna, Lala Franco, Bendy Girl
- Occupations: Contortionist, Experimental Artist

Leilani "Lucky" Franco, (born. 9 April 1986) is a British contortionist based in London and Berlin.

She is most well known for appearances of a 2012 Britain's Got Talent semi-finalist, 2012 Das Supertalent semi-finalist and 2011 Eurovision solo dancer in Turkey. She has Guinness World Records for travelling a distance of 20 m (65 ft 7 in) in a back-bent position in a time of 10.05 seconds and the fastest contortion roll over a distance of 20 m (65 ft 7 in) in a time of 17.47 seconds.

She performs as a freelancer with several companies in London and Berlin, such as NoFit State Circus, Cirque du Soleil, Cirque Eloize, The Box Soho, and Little Big World.

== Early life ==
Franco began her career at the age of six. In her youth, she studied piano, dance, martial arts and gymnastics until the age of sixteen in Manila, Philippines. There she joined the Philippine Ballet Theatre. Then she attended École nationale de cirque in Montreal, Quebec, Canada from 2005, where she received the Diploma of Contortion and Circus Arts in 2008 and a minor in Chinese pole dancing.

== Works ==
From 2008 to 2010, Franco worked exclusively with Cirque Éloize as a contortionist. In 2011, she moved to London to work as a freelance artist in clubs and cabarets such as The Box Soho, Cafe de Paris, Supperclub, The Old Vic Tunnels Edinburgh Fringe Festival and at various shows with the old Boom Boom club (now Boom and Bang Circus) in South Bank, London.

Since 2013, she has participated in the show Little Big World by Sebastiano Toma in Germany. Additionally, she worked in the show Dummy at Chameleon Theatre as a replacement.

== Awards and career highlights ==
- 2013 Guinness World Records – 3 World records
- 2013 UK Circus Meximus – finalist
- 2012 Das Supertalent – semi-finalist
- 2012 Britain's Got Talent – semi-finalist
- 2012 Stoli UK Original's – winner, subject of the documentary produced by Stoli, directed by Martin Smith
- 2011 SolyCirco Festival GOP – Star of Tomorrow Award
- 2011 Eurovision – solo dancer for Turkey with the rock group Yüksek Sadakat
- 2010 Cirque du Demain Paris – Coup de Coeur Award for Leilani and Sancho duo, bboy and contortionist

== Personality ==
Franco is currently attending BA Contemporary Media Practice at the University of Westminster and is expected to graduate in the summer 2014. There she experiments her advanced potentials in performance by blending and integrating different media arts such as film-making, new media, installations with contortion. While she studies different media voluntarily in the academic field, she also shows her interests in expanding her artistic field. She has founded a production company, Twisted Arthouse, and is producing and starring in her upcoming film project.
