= Frontbend =

Contortion position

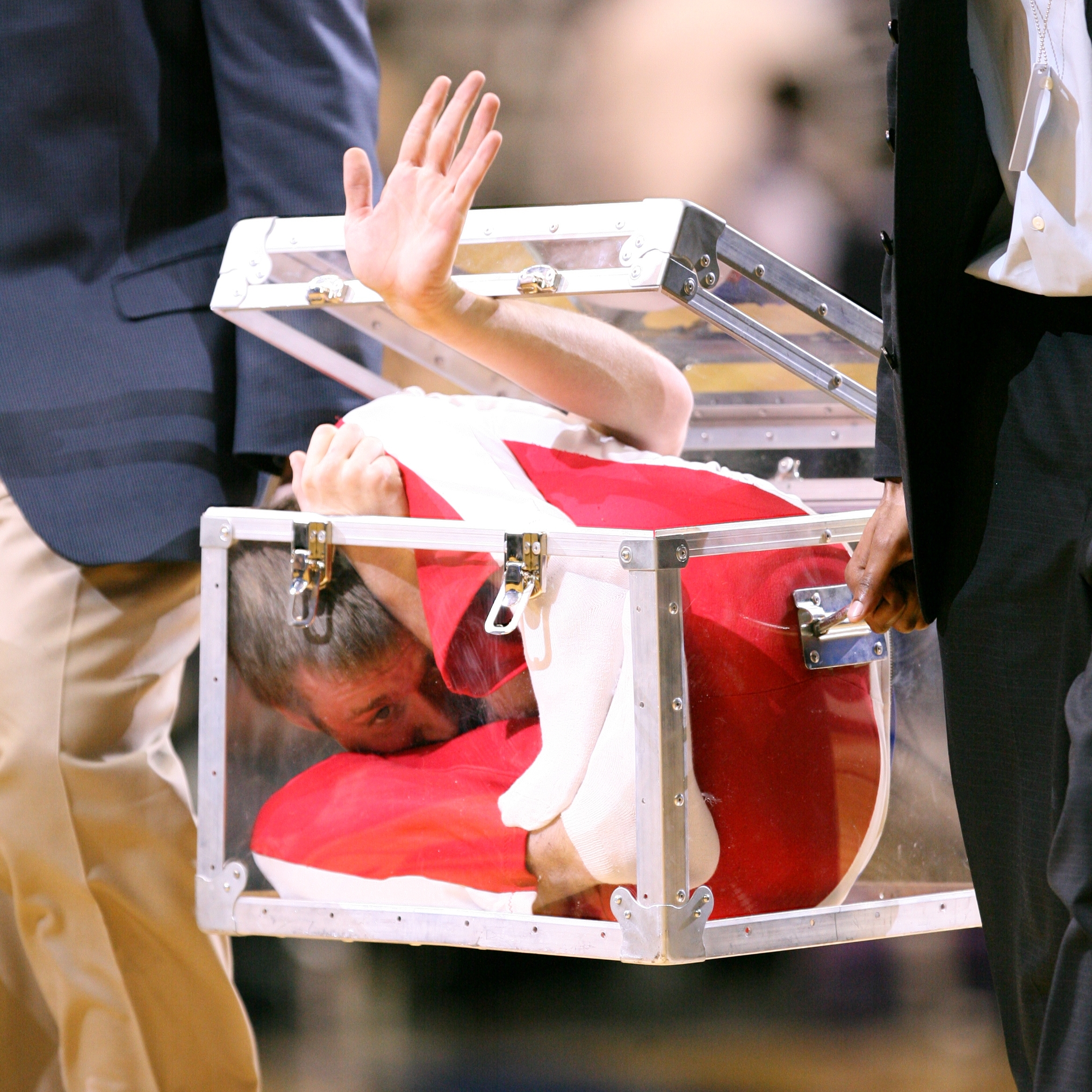
This contortionist has used a frontbend to fit himself in this small trunk

A frontbend is a contortion position where the body is curved forward at the hips and spine. In an extreme frontbend, some contortionists can place the backs of their knees behind their shoulders.

== See also ==
- Paschimottanasana (seated forward bend with legs straight)
- Uttanasana (standing forward bend with legs straight)
- Kurmasana "Tortoise pose" (seated forward bend with arms under straight legs)
- Bowing
