= Major Zamora =

Major Zamora was a dime museum performer in the late 1890s. Born in St. Johns, Zamora was a physical dwarf who specialized in feats of contortionism and enterology (squeezing into impossibly small spaces, or getting inside a sealed container without disturbing it) and, as an offshoot of this, was a feature escape artist before the advent of Houdini. He was billed, alternately, as "The Triple-jointed Dwarf" and "The Triple-jointed Wonder." His ad hype claimed he was 'triple-jointed' in all the connections of his body. Zamora performed in circus acrobat tights, and sported the large handlebar moustache so common in men's grooming of the 1890s. Zamora stood 32 inches (0.81 m) in height and weighed 54 pounds (24 kg).

Zamora's features were squeezing himself in and out of an oversized, but still quite small, bottle, and escaping after being tied, chained, handcuffed and locked inside a small, upright box. Zamora is referred to in Panorama of Magic by Milbourne Christopher, and in Learned Pigs and Fireproof Women by Ricky Jay.

Zamora married Tina Goughman, who was billed as the "smallest living woman" and was 4 inches taller than the Major.
