= Alexey Goloborodko =

Russian contortionist (born 1994)

Aleksei Goloborodko
- Born: December 1994 (age 31); Tula, Russia
- Other names: Snakeman
- Years active: 1998-Present
- Known for: Minute of fame, Voyage de la Vie, LUZIA, contortion ability

Aleksei I. Goloborodko (Russian: Алексей Голобородько, Russian pronunciation: [ɐlʲɪkˈsʲej ɡəɫɐbɐˈrotʲkə], born 1994) is a Russian contortionist. In addition to contortion, he has trained in classical and modern dance and Chinese martial arts. He has performed in various arts festivals and competitions, television programs, circuses, and shows. He is currently in the Cirque du Soleil show Luzia.

== Early life ==
Goloborodko was born in Tula, Russia. Goloborodko's mother said that his natural flexibility sometimes scared people. He was then spotted by his coach-to-be, Vladislav Afanasievich Rodin, in the Circus Circle in Tula.

== Career ==
=== Festivals and awards ===
Goloborodko has participated in many circus and arts festivals and competitions.

- Winner of the first prize for his contortion performance at a Circus Festival in Russia in 2003
- Bronze medalist at the international children's circus competition in Monte Carlo, Dec 2007
- Medal winner at the Moscow Youth Festival of Circus Arts
- Medal winner at the Circus Festival in the city of Ivanovo
- Winner at the Festival of arts and sports Golden Lily Kyiv, 27 Oct 2007
- Special Jury Prize - "Dancing Rubber" Sixth Moscow International Youth Festival of Circus Arts 2007
- Winner of a gold medal at the VII Youth Delphic Games of Russia, Novosibirsk, May 2008. An absolute winner in the "Circus" category
- Third place - Second World Delphic Games Saratov, Russia. Circus - Age group 10–30, 19–25 September 2008
- Silver Medal at 8th China Wuhan International Acrobatics Art Festival, Hubei Province, China, 26 Oct 2008
- Youngest participant in the III Festival of Circus and Arts, Ishevsk, Russia, March 2010

=== Television appearances ===
A documentary program about him was made for Russian television channel REN-TV, in 2003, when he was aged nine.

In late 2007 Goloborodko took part in the TV talent competition:- Минута Славы, or Minuta Slavy - "A Minute Of Fame". The Russian show from the "Got Talent" franchise. This was the event that made him a household name throughout his country, and brought him to the attention of many abroad as well.

In the first round he performed a ballet and contortion routine: The Swan. The musical accompaniment was Ave Maria by Charles Gounod, played on wine glasses, crystal xylophone and bass guitar by the St. Petersburg trio Crystal Harmony. There was a very enthusiastic response from the audience, and he won easily.

In the second round the act was: Sun God, based on a classical Indian dance. Goloborodko's elaborate costume was designed to look as though it was made from gold and jewels. The music was a recorded version of Recuerdos de la Alhambra by Francisco Tárrega. Again there was an ecstatic response from the audience, and again he won the round.

In the third round Goloborodko performed Obsession, his trademark contortion act using two folding chairs. The audience loved it, the judges apparently did not, and the eventual winner of the competition was Dmitry Bulkin, with his acrobatic performance on a vertical pole. There was a complaint by Rodin that Bulkin had misled the organizers of the competition, by claiming to be an amateur, and a car mechanic by trade, when he had actually performed in the Cirque du Soleil, and other prestigious circuses.

In February 2010 he took part in the Channel TF1 French TV Talent Show Qui Sera le Meilleur ce Soir? He won the first round, a one on one competition with twelve-year-old Swiss contortionist Zoé Pauli-Bruttin. In the final, however, the judges opined that he came across as a professional intruding into a contest for amateurs, and he lost to Loan and Emeryck, two much younger children with a dance act.

=== Live performances ===
Goloborodko has become a regular performer at the circus, having worked at Circo Massimo, Rome, in July 2008, Circus Sarasota, Florida, in Feb/March 2009, and Circus Conelli, Zurich, in November 2009. He has also performed on board a cruise ship SuperStar Virgo, operating in South-East Asia, in June–August 2009.

From June 2010 to June 2011 he appeared as "The Game Master... a friendly and mischievous sprite" in "Voyage de la Vie" at Resorts World Sentosa in Singapore. This production, billed as a "circus theatre spectacular", tells the story of a boy's coming of age, through song and dance and circus arts.

During November and December 2011 Goloborodko appeared in a variety show at the GoEasy Charisma Cabaret Lounge in Würenlingen, Switzerland.

In April 2016 he joined the world-renowned circus company Cirque du Soleil, performing contortion with their touring show Luzia.
