= Luzia (Cirque du Soleil) =

Touring Cirque du Soleil show on Mexican culture

- Logo for Cirque du Soleil's Luzia
- Company: Cirque du Soleil
- Genre: Contemporary circus
- Show type: Touring show
- Date of premiere: April 21, 2016 (Montreal)

Creative team
- Conception and director: Daniele Finzi Pasca

Other information
- Preceded by: Paramour (2016)
- Succeeded by: Sép7imo Día - No Descansaré (2017)
- Official website

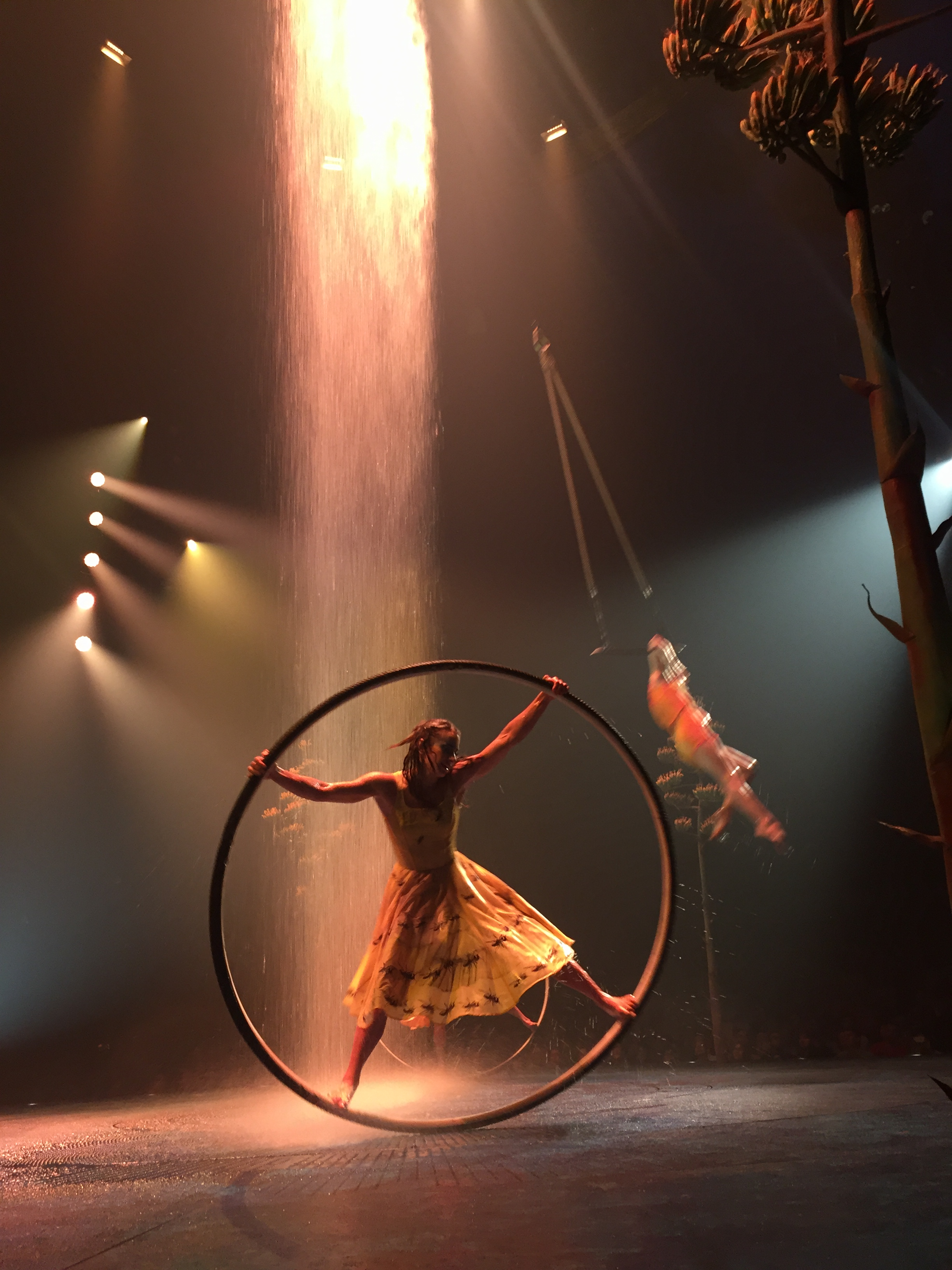
Cyr wheel act from Luzia

Luzia is a Cirque du Soleil show inspired by the richness of the Mexican culture. The name Luzia fuses the sound of luz ("light" in Spanish) and lluvia ("rain"), two elements at the core of the show's creation.

Luzia has a cast of 44 artists from 15 countries; it is Cirque du Soleil's 38th production since 1984, and its 17th show presented under the Big Top. Its creative team comprises 16 creators under the artistic guidance of director Daniele Finzi Pasca.

== Music ==
The music listed below is from the soundtrack released at the premiere of the show, but does not represent the live music in the show. The soundtrack was recorded in partnership with 'Bostich + Fussible' (real names: Ramón Amezcua and Pepe Mogt) who remixed some of the Luzia songs composed by Simon Carpentier. In an interview with Billboard.com, Alain Vinet, Cirque du Soleil's musical director explained the reason for the partnership: "Normally, the albums come out six months down the road, or a year down the road [after the show opens], because when we are in creation, the musicians are really, really busy; it’s impossible for us to take them out of the creation. But the mandate was for us to have the CD for the opening of the show. The only way we could achieve this was to outsource the production of the CD, and that is why we went with Nortec."

Track titles as they appear in order on the CD:

1. "Asi Es La Vida" (Hoop diving on treadmills)
2. "Tiembla La Tierra" (Adagio)
3. "Flores En El Desierto" (Cyr wheel and trapeze)
4. "Pambolero" (Football dance)
5. "Pez Volador" (Handbalancing)
6. "Los Mosquitos" (Masts and poles)
7. "Alebrijes" (Contortion)
8. "Tlaloc" (Aerial straps)
9. "Cierra Los Ojos" (Water curtain)
10. "Fiesta Finale" (Curtain call)

== Tour ==
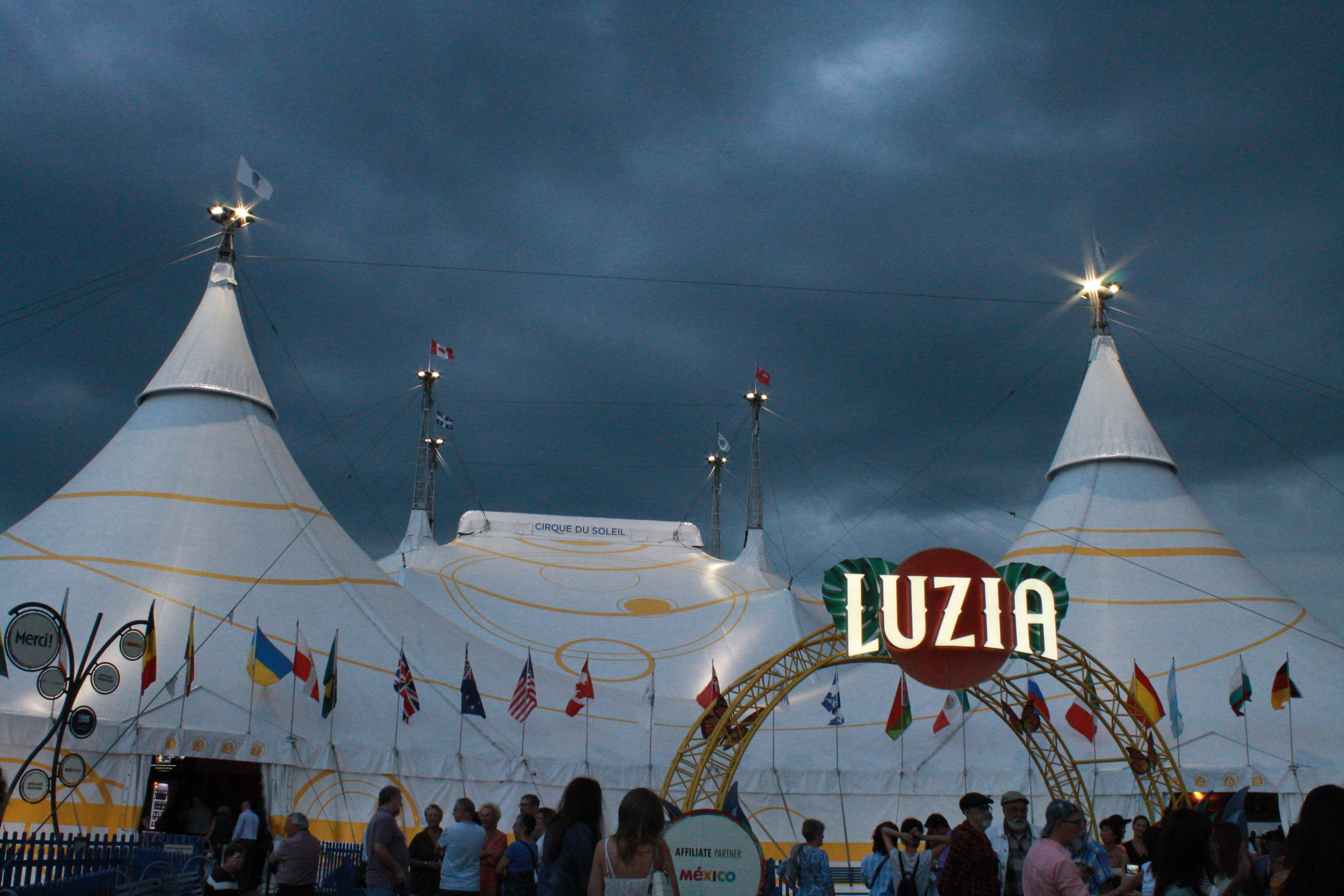
The grand chapiteau for Luzia in Toronto, September 2016

Luzia began its Grand Chapiteau tour in North America in a white and yellow Big Top whose solar system elements reflect the importance of space, and especially the moon, in Mexican culture. The main tent is white with yellow curves to represent the paths of the planets around the moon, and the artistic tent is yellow to represent the sun. A Tapis Rouge tent was introduced at the San Francisco run.

== Rain curtain and pool ==
A notable aspect of Luzia is the center-stage rain curtain which was created by French company Aquatique Show. The rain truss consists of a rotating chassis with a line of individually-controlled valves to precisely release water, creating patterns and images. The chassis also has twelve lights to illuminate and emphasize the rain, and the floor of the stage is perforated to let water drain. The falling rain displays common Mexican patterns, animals, and foliage/trees.

The stage features a 3,000-liter (790-U.S.-gallon) pool and a separate truck outside of the tent with a 3,500-liter (920-U.S.-gallon) tank to store water for the pool and rain curtain during/in-between shows. The system also allows the water of the pool to be pumped to the truck so it can be filtered and cleaned. The water temperature is kept in the upper 30s (~100 °F) for the comfort of the performing artists.

== Critical reception ==
The Guardian, "Luzia is one of the company’s stronger shows and also brings surprises and engaging, tongue-in-cheek characters."

Los Angeles Times, "The result feels less like a circus than some sort of high-end tech trade show, the acts seemingly rushed through on the way to the next gadgetry display."
