= Velma Adkerson =

American burlesque dancer and clothing designer

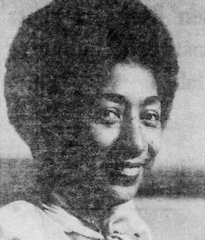
- Adkerson in 1976
- Born: October 12, 1922; Atlanta, Georgia
- Died: October 14, 2012 (aged 90); Anchorage, Alaska
- Other names: Miss Wiggles, Tanya Patterson
- Occupations: dancer, clothing designer
- Known for: contortion

Velma "Miss Wiggles" Adkerson (October 12, 1922- October 14, 2012) was a burlesque dancer known for touring the United States with acts such as Louis Jordan and Chuck Berry. Adkerson was a contortionist who was a popular act in the 1950s and 1960s.

== Early life and education ==
Adkerson was born Velma Thomas in Atlanta, Georgia in 1922 to Arthur Thomas, a preacher, and Lillie (Williams) Thomas, one of four children. She sometimes said she was born in Ethiopia. She enjoyed dancing early in life. She also had a bout with polio as a young person, used a wheelchair for two years, and underwent several operations as a result. She said that her dancing helped her manage the results of the polio.

== Career ==
Adkerson moved to New Orleans to dance professionally when she was nineteen, in the 1940s. She performed in nightclubs with a contortionist routine and was billed as "Snake Hips" for the first eight years of her career. In the waning days of vaudeville, she would perform in all-white clubs as a "break in" act, one that was "a comic yet appreciable exotic diversion." This paved the way for other Black performers to play in those clubs. She moved from New Orleans to Los Angeles, met a booking agent named Johnny Robinson, and began touring the US in nightclubs and theaters.

She performed in Texas, including a long run at the Eastwood Club in San Antonio where she performed for over 20 years from 1954 through 1977. She went on the road in 1955 as part of a touring group which included Chuck Berry and Arthur Prysock. She claimed to be at Jack Ruby's club in Dallas when JFK was shot. In the early 1960s she was said to be earning $700 per week.

Her dancing was mainly performed upside down while balanced on a stool or chair, rotating and gyrating on the chair to music. Adkerson clarified that she was a dancer, not a stripper or an exotic dancer, despite advertising sometimes saying that she was both. She stated that she would mimic a striptease, removing her dress but having a bodysuit on underneath, while other reports said that she ended her act in "pasties and a g-string."

She met and married entertainment columnist and bail bondsman Fred Adkerson while performing in Alaska in 1963. The two of them traveled extensively, often taking cruises. While she was mostly retired after 1978, her last performance was on a cruise, at age 80, entertaining other passengers. The couple raised six children, some their own and some adopted.

== Post-dancing career ==
Adkerson settled in Anchorage, Alaska after her dancing career and began working as a clothing designer. She was heavily into public service, both through direct acts of charity—taking people into her home who were in difficult situations—and more general activities—creating clothing for runway shows, which she would also perform at, with the proceeds going to charity.
