= Hair hang =

Aerial circus act

The hair hang is an aerial circus act where performers (usually young women) are suspended by their hair, performing acrobatic poses and/or manipulation. Performers hang suspended by their hair, which is tied into a hairhang rig; the techniques used to tie the performer's hair and the acrobatic techniques involved in the act are key.

The impressive tensile strength of human hair isn’t generally recognized, coinciding with strong audience reactions to the stunt. A single strand can potentially carry a weight of up to 100 grams (3.5 oz).

Hair hanging acts are prominently featured in the Cirque du Soleil touring productions Volta and Bazzar. In 2020, American violinist Lindsey Stirling hung from her hair while playing her signature piece "Crystalize" as part of her Home for the Holidays virtual concert.

== See also ==
- Circus skills
- Iron jaw (circus)
