= Contortion =

Performance art using skills of extreme physical flexibility

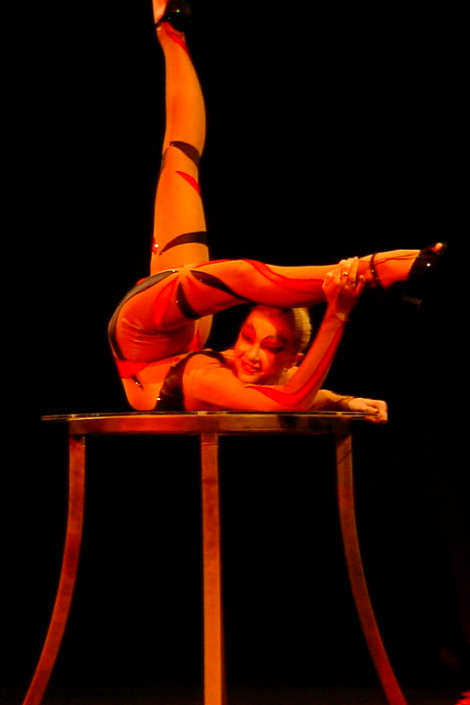
Contortionist Julia Akmaletdinova performing at the International Contortion Convention, 2003

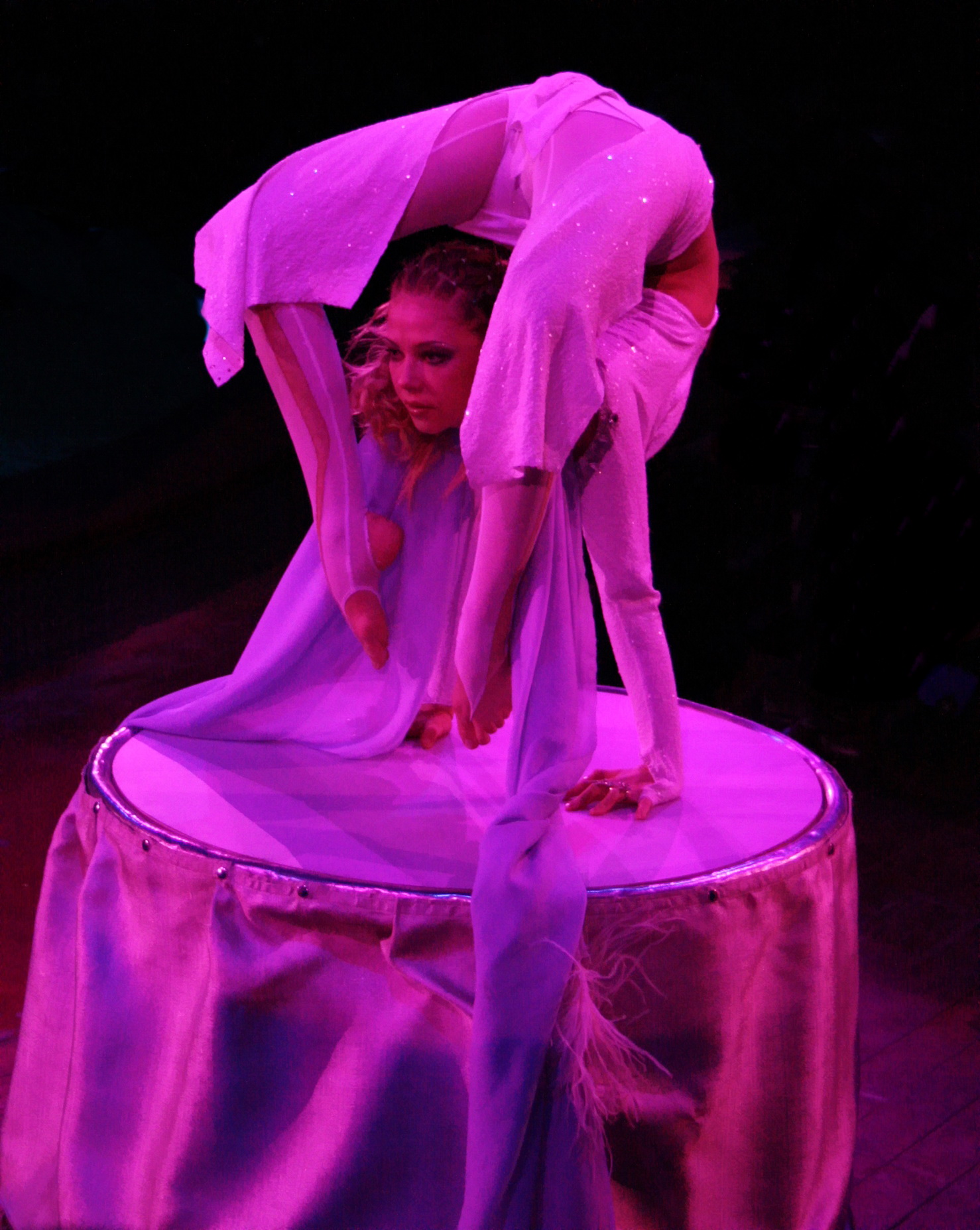
Contortionist Maria Efremkina performing in 2010.

Contortion (sometimes contortionism) is a performance art in which performers called contortionists showcase their skills of extreme physical flexibility. Contortion acts often accompany acrobatics, circus acts, street performers and other live performing arts. Contortion acts are typically performed in front of a live audience. An act will showcase one or more artists performing a choreographed set of moves or poses, often to music, which require extreme flexibility. The physical flexibility required to perform such acts greatly exceeds that of the general population. It is the dramatic feats of seemingly inhuman flexibility that captivate audiences.

== Skills ==
Many factors affect the flexibility of performers including age, genetics, stature, and adherence to rigorous physical training routines. Most contortionists are generally categorized as "frontbenders" or "backbenders", depending on the direction in which their spine is most flexible. Relatively few performers are equally adept at both. Individuals with hypermobility, such as those with EDS, may possess an increased range of motion. However, this can lead to joint instability and a higher risk of injury. Therefore, extensive strength training and conditioning are essential to stabilize joints and prevent overextension.

Skills performed by contortionists include:

- Frontbending skills such as folding forward at the waist with the legs straight, or placing one or both legs behind the neck or shoulders with the knees bent (called a human knot).
- Backbending skills such as touching one's head to one's feet, or all the way to the buttocks (called a head-seat), while standing, lying on the floor, or in a handstand. A Marinelli bend is a backbend while supported only by a grip at the top of a short post that is held in the mouth.
- Splits and oversplits (a split of more than 180 degrees) may be included in frontbending or backbending acts. An oversplit may be performed while the feet are supported by two chairs or by two assistants.
- Enterology is the practice of squeezing one's body into a small, knee-high box or other contained space which initially appears to audiences as being too small to contain the performer. Also known as ‘body packing’.
- Dislocations of the shoulders or hip joints are sometimes performed as a short novelty act by itself. One example is lifting the arm to the side until it passes behind the head and lies across the top of the shoulders; also referred to as bone breaking.

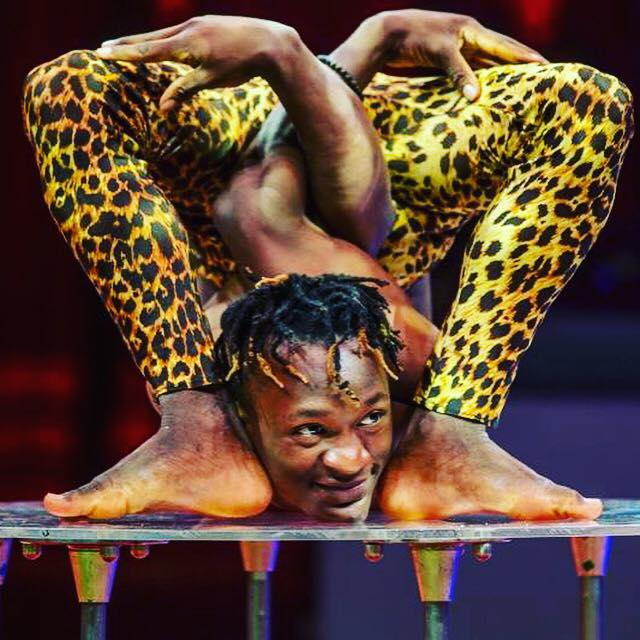
Hussein Yoga performing a combination of a cheststand and dislocation

== Risks ==
Contortionists with hypermobility are at an elevated risk of joint dislocations, subluxations, and soft tissue injuries due to the increased range of motion and decreased joint stability. However, the belief that contortionists invariably suffer long-term injuries is a misconception. Many develop exceptionally strong core and stabilizing muscles, which are vital for injury prevention. Few people can safely attempt extreme contortion poses, so the strength required is often underappreciated.

Evidence from medical studies is limited. A 2008 study by Peoples et al. used whole-spine dynamic magnetic resonance imaging (MRI) to examine five contortionists aged 20 to 49. The study documented limbus vertebrae, intervertebral disc bulges, and disc degeneration in some participants, and three reported back pain. Given the very small sample size, these findings are preliminary and cannot be generalized to all contortionists. They suggest that extreme spinal movements may contribute to certain spinal changes, but further research with larger cohorts is necessary to fully understand long-term spinal health implications.

It is also worth noting that a large number of contortionists retire perfectly healthy, demonstrating that with proper conditioning, technique, and strength training, many performers can maintain long-term musculoskeletal health. Proper conditioning, proprioceptive training, and injury prevention strategies are vital to mitigate risks.

== Performances ==
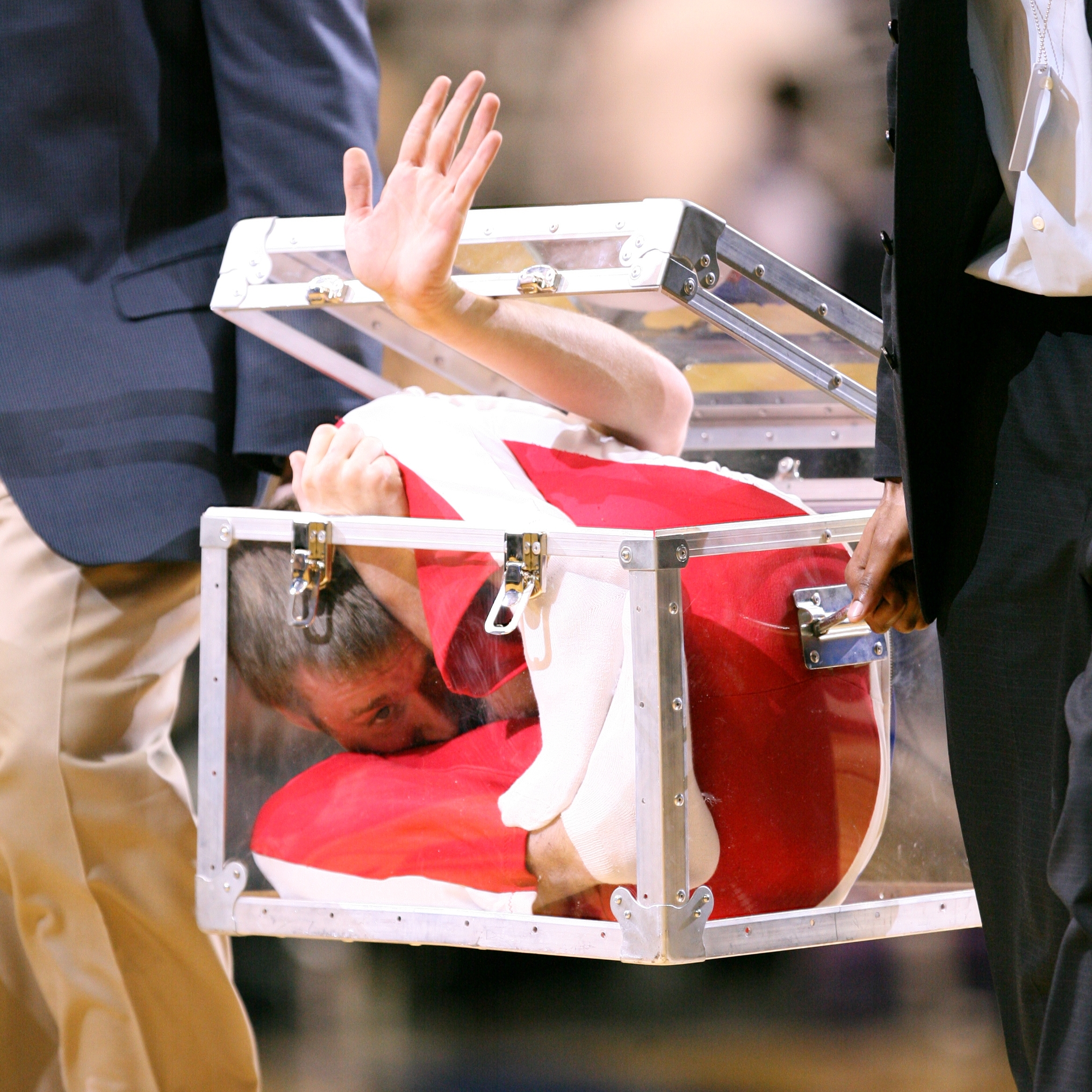
This man in a trunk is an example of enterology.

Contortion acts are highly variable; many incorporate elements of humor, drama, shock, sensuality, or a blend of styles. Contortion may be incorporated into other types of performance, such as dance and theater.

- An adagio act is an acrobatic dance in which one partner lifts and carries the other partner as she/he performs splits and other flexible poses.
- In a rag doll or golliwogg act, one or two assistants bend, shake and carry the contortionist in such a way as to create the illusion that the disguised performer is actually a limp, life-sized doll. The act often ends by stuffing the doll into a small box.
- Contortion positions can be performed on a Spanish web, an aerial act consisting of a rope with a hand/foot loop that is spun by someone underneath.
- Contortionists might manipulate props during their performance, for instance spinning hula hoops or juggling rings, balancing towers of wine glasses, or playing a musical instrument - such as Max Smith, AKA "The Musical Contortionist," a sideshow performer who played the banjo whilst in a series of contorted positions.

A contortionist may perform alone or may have one or two assistants, or up to four contortionists may perform together as a group.

In the past, contortionists were associated almost exclusively with circuses and fairs. More recently they have also been found performing in nightclubs, amusement parks, in magazine advertisements, at trade shows, on television variety shows, in music videos, and as warmup acts or in the background at music concerts.

The Ross Sisters were American contortionists most famous for their musical rendition of 'Solid Potato Salad' in the 1944 movie Broadway Rhythm. In addition, contortion photos and digital movie clips are traded by fans on the Internet, and several web sites provide original photos of contortion acts for a monthly fee, or sell videotapes of performances through the mail.

Some loose-jointed people are able to pop a joint out of its socket without pain, thereby making it difficult to determine if a joint is dislocated without medical examination such as an X-ray. However, as long as the joint socket is the right shape, most extreme bends can be achieved without dislocating the joint. Actual dislocations are rarely used during athletic contortion acts since they make the joint more unstable and prone to injury, and a dislocated limb cannot lift itself or support any weight.

== History ==
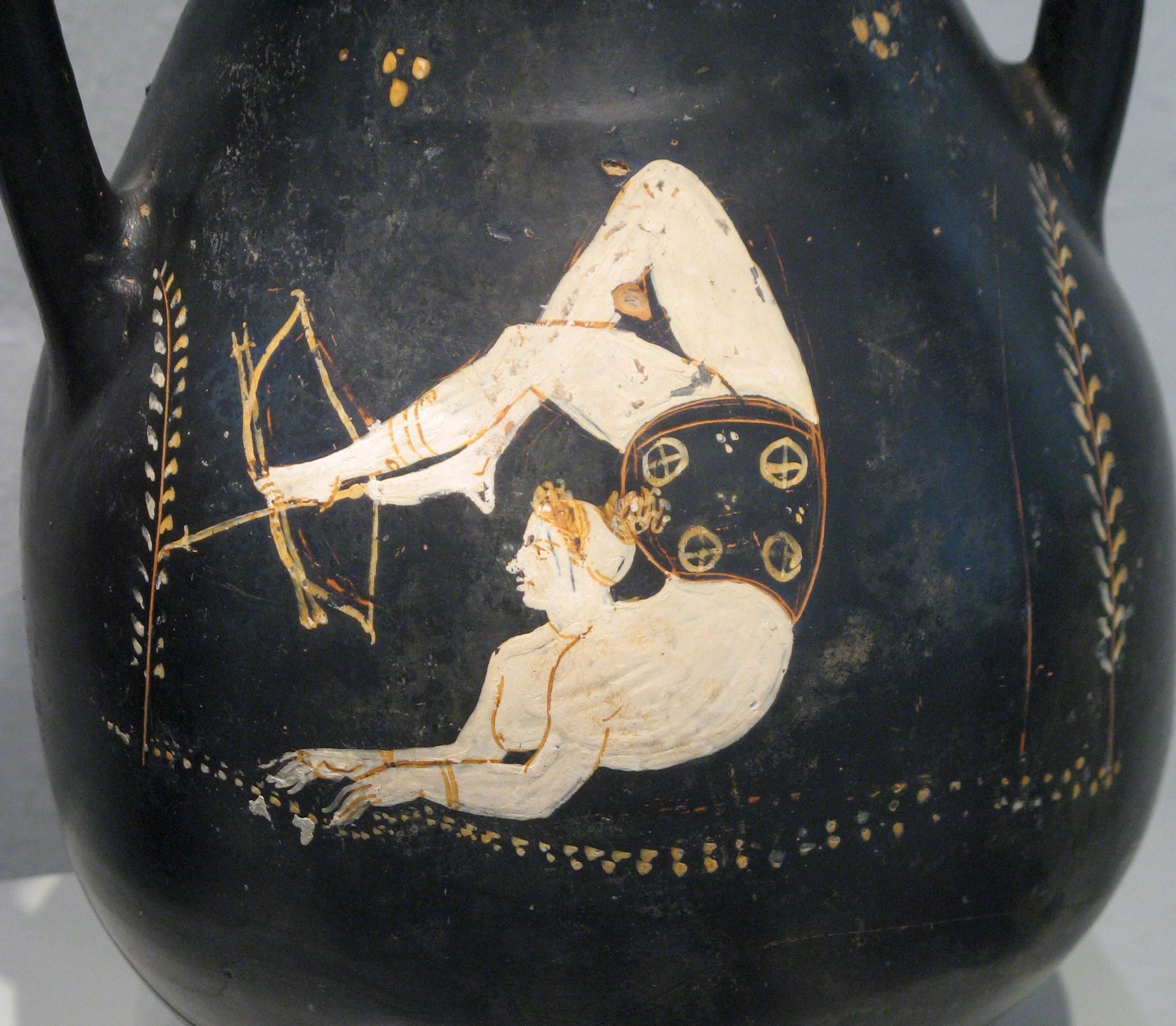
Female contortionist shooting a bow and arrow with her feet (Greek Gnathia style pelike, 4th century BC

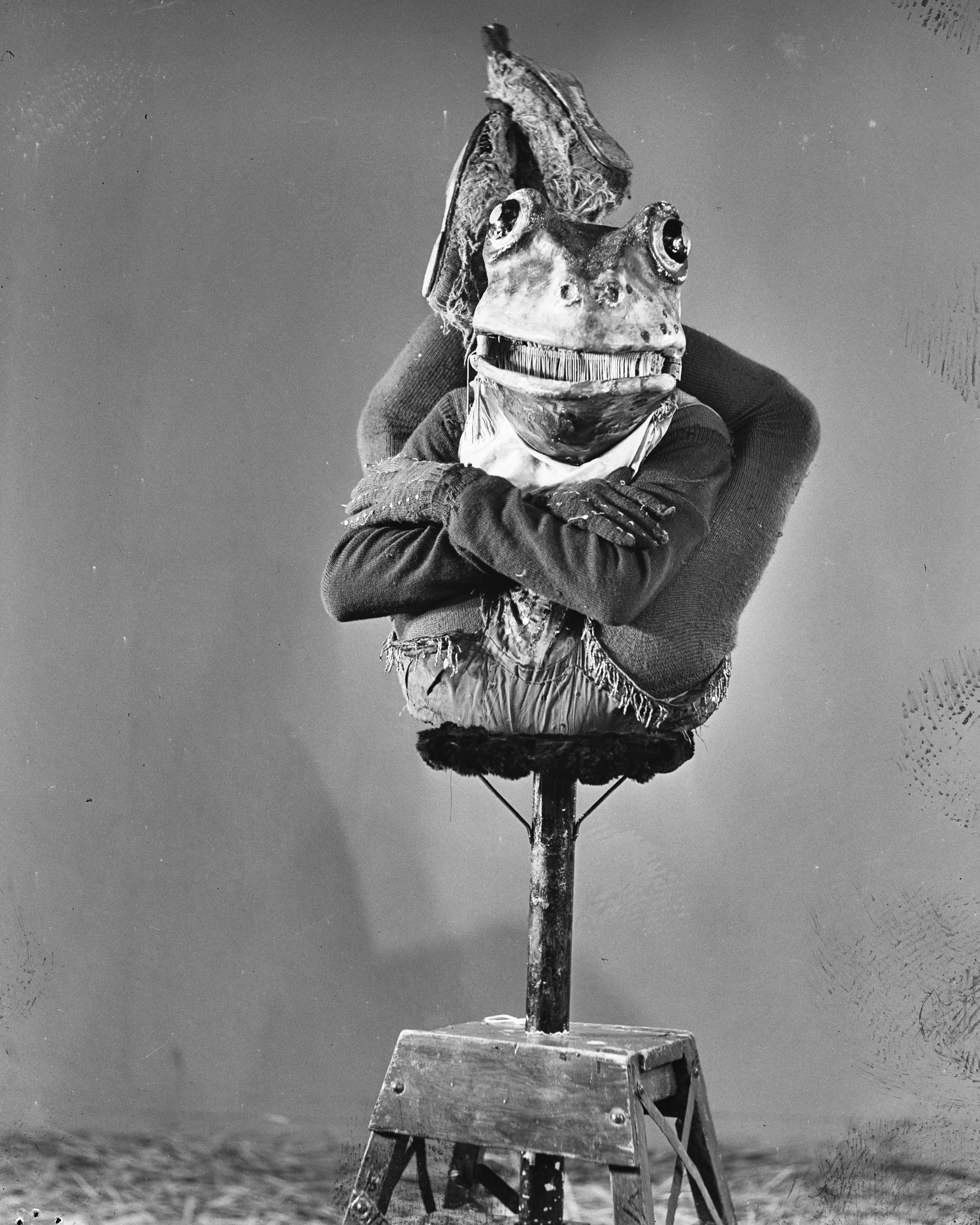
Contortionist David Mitchell, Sydney, 1942

The primary origins of contortion take place in Asian traditions. In China and Mongolia, traditional Buddhist Cham dances would incorporate contortion into their movement. The success of these dances then encouraged the act to expand into other forms of performance. Contortion also found similarities and expressions in the Hindu doctrine of yoga. Throughout daily meditation, yoga practitioners work to assume many similar poses to those in the performance-based contortion. The recognition of these similarities in various practices and thoughts brought contortion into more clear and explicit light. For those in the Chinese tradition, contortion is typically performed as a feat of acrobatics, used to dazzle the audience with the unusual shapes built before them. According to Chinese historical records, early contortionism originated in China during Western Zhou Dynasty (1045-771 BC), which matured in Sui Dynasty (581–618).

== List of notable contortionists ==
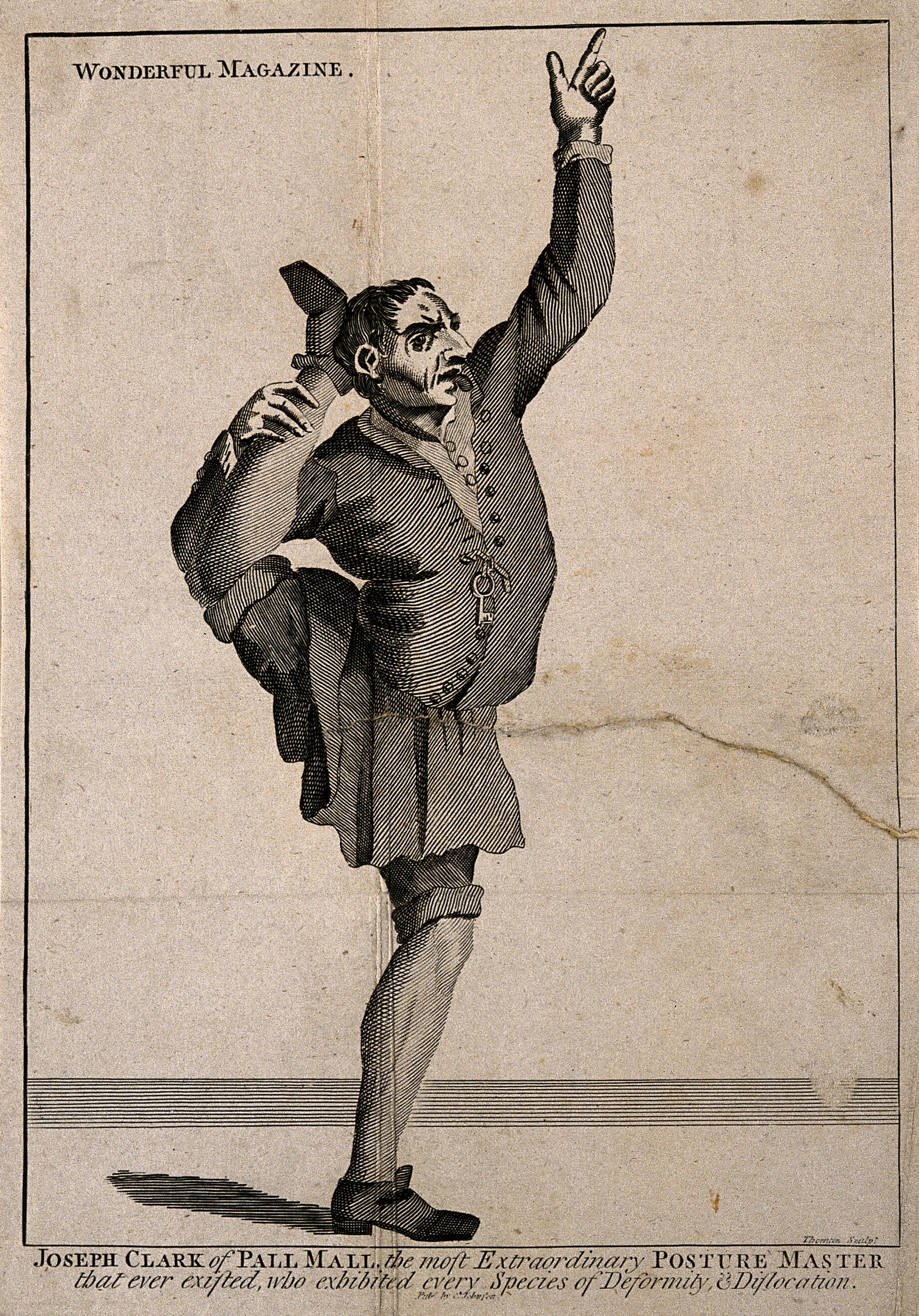
Line engraving of Joseph Clark of Pall Mall, London, "the most extraordinary Posture Master"

- Velma Adkerson - American contortionist known as "Miss Wiggles"
- Arne Arnardo – Norwegian circus performer
- Christine Danton – Australian contortionist who appeared on Australia's Got Talent
- Sofie Dossi – American contortionist and YouTuber who appeared in season 11 of America's Got Talent
- Leilani Franco – British contortionist who appeared on Britain's Got Talent
- Takako Fuji – Japanese actress
- Alexey Goloborodko – Russian contortionist
- Jinny Jacinto - Canadian contortionist who has performed with Cirque du Soleil
- Doug Jones – American actor and creature performer
- Irina Kazakova – Russian contortionist and gymnast
- Anna McNulty - YouTuber, Canadian Contortionist
- Bonnie Morgan – American actress and contortionist who used contortion when playing Colette in Netflix's A Series of Unfortunate Events
- Olga Pikhienko – Russian contortionist and circus performer
- The Ross Sisters – Trio of sisters who were singers, dancers, and acrobats
- Daniel Browning Smith's exceptional flexibility is attributed to hypermobile Ehlers–Danlos syndrome. However, he also emphasizes the importance of rigorous strength training and conditioning to maintain joint stability and prevent injuries associated with hypermobility.
- Major Zamora – Canadian dwarfish dime museum contortionist and escape artist

== Glossary ==
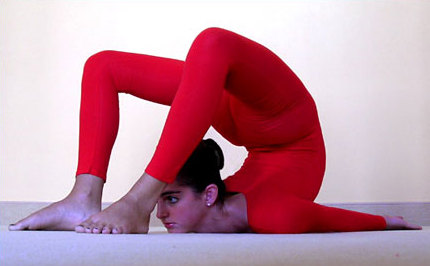
Example of a chest stand

- Backbend - Any pose with an unusual degree of backward bending at the waist and/or any portion of spine while standing, kneeling, resting on the floor, or while suspended.
- Box act (also called: body packing; enterology; packanatomicalization) - Circus act in which a contortionist squeezes his/her body into a small box or transparent container.
- Chest stand - Any backbending pose in which the performer's chest is resting on the floor for support.
- Dislocate - 1. [verb] To injure a joint by temporarily forcing the bone out of its normal socket. 2. [noun] In men's gymnastics, a rotating of the shoulders when performing a backwards turn on the still rings. Many skills in acrobatics appear to involve dislocating a joint, when they actually do not.
- Durvasa's pose or crane pose - Named for the mythological Indian sage, Durvasa, who supposedly assumed this pose during his years of penance: to stand on one foot with the other leg lifted in front and placed behind the neck or shoulders.

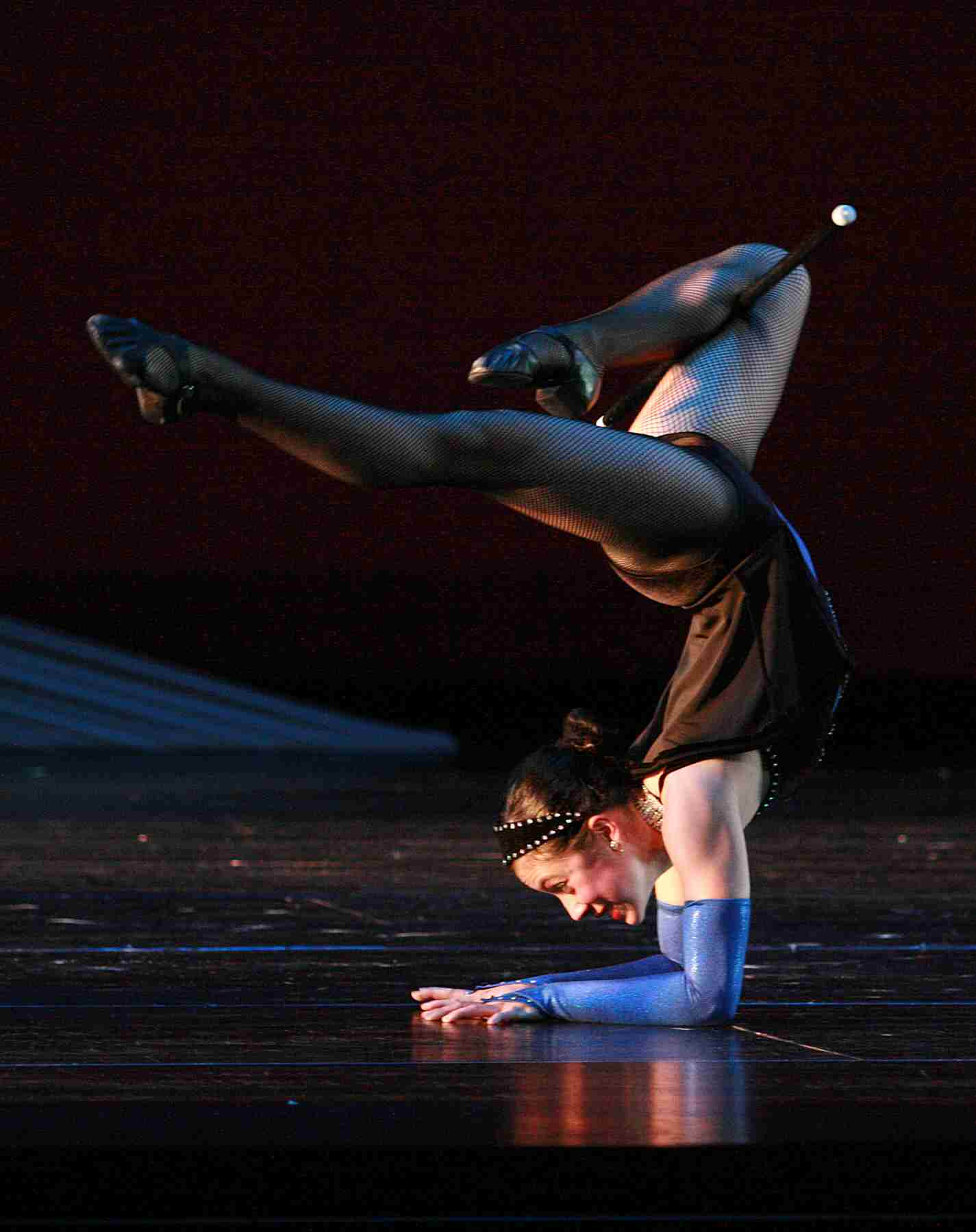
An elbow stand performed by an acro dancer

- Elbow stand - Any inverted pose in which the performer uses only the forearms on the floor for support.
- Frontbend - Any pose that features an unusual degree of frontward bending of the waist and/or spine, either with the legs together or parted.
- Front split (also called: stride split) - A split in which one leg is extended frontward and the other leg is extended backward, both at right angles to the trunk. Ideally, the hips are square facing to the front, while both legs are turned out from the hips.
- Hairpin - A pose in which one kneels down, sits on top of the feet, and bends backwards until the top of the head comes into contact with the tailbone; it may also done with a starting position on hands and knees.
- Headsit - An extreme backbend in which the top of the performer's head touches the buttocks; usually in a handstand or chest stand. Sometimes, a more extreme variation is done where the buttocks are positioned past the performer's head, while the lower back is on top of the head; this requires much more neck flexibility.
- Leg shouldering - A standing split in which the leg touches the shoulder. Can be done to the front, side, or rear.
- Marinelli bend - [from contortionist and international theatrical agent H. B. Marinelli (1864–1924)] A headsit with the legs extended, performed while supported only by a leather mouth grip at the top of a short post.
- Needle scale - A front split while standing on the forward foot, with the torso bent downward with the hands touching the floor, while the rear leg is extended vertically toward the ceiling.
- Ruppel fold: A contortion position named after Alina Ruppel in which the performer folds their torso forward while simultaneously bending one or both legs backward over the shoulders, creating a compact, layered shape. This position requires extreme spinal flexibility and core strength.
- Oversplit (also called: hypersplit) - Any split in which the angle formed by the legs measures greater than 180 degrees. It can be done to the front with either or both legs elevated, or in a straddle split with one or both legs elevated.
- Passive stretching (also called: static-passive stretching; assisted relaxed stretching) - 1. A static stretch (See: "static stretching") in which an external force (such as the floor or another person) holds the performer in the static position. 2. The practice of having a relaxed limb moved beyond its normal range of motion with the assistance of a partner. In "active stretching", in contrast, the limb is extended to its maximum range using only the muscles of that limb.
- Pike - To be bend forward at the waist with the legs and trunk kept straight.
- Pointe - In classical ballet, when a dancer uses special shoes (called pointe shoes or toe shoes) to dance en pointe (on their toes). The arch of the top of the foot is at its maximum when the dancer "pushes over", causing the heel of the foot to be almost directly over the toes. Difficult and often painful to learn, both men and women may benefit from studying pointe technique; however, most performance opportunities are for women only. Children do not begin to study pointe until they have years of experience and sufficient ankle strength, as well as being old enough to ensure that their bones are strong enough.
- Ragdoll act (also known as a golliwogg act) - A type of circus performance in which a contortionist, dressed in a loose-fitting clown costume, appears to be a lifeless, floppy doll. One or two assistants manipulate the contortionist's body, bending, rolling, and posing it in various ways, creating the illusion of a limp, inanimate object. The act culminates with the assistants squeezing the contortionist into a surprisingly small box, adding to the comedic and astonishing effect of the performance.
- Rhythmic gymnastics (also called: rhythmic sportive gymnastics (RSG); rhythmics) - Olympic sport for one woman (or 5 women in group competition) consisting of a balletic floor exercise which demonstrates leaps, turns, balance and flexibility while moving and tossing hand-held apparatus: a ball, a rope, a hoop, two clubs, or a ribbon. Men's rhythmic gymnastics currently exists in Japan, and is gaining worldwide acceptance.
- Rope act (also called: Spanish web) - Circus act in which an acrobat (usually female) performs exercises high above the floor while holding on to a long, vertically suspended rope, or hanging from a loop in the rope.
- Scale - In acrobatics, when the leg is raised toward the back and may be held with one hand while standing.
- Split (also called: the splits) - Any pose in which the legs are extended in opposite directions such that the angle of the legs is 180 degrees.
- Straddle split (also called: side split; box split; Chinese split; cut split) - A split in which the legs are extended to the left and right, until a 180 degree angle between the legs is reached.
- Tortoise position (also called: pancake) - A seated forward bend with the chest against the floor between the legs; the outstretched arms are also against the floor and underneath the knees.
- Triple fold - A variation of a chest stand where the knees bend and lower all the way down to the ground, allowing the shins to lie flat on the floor, resulting in a stacked position with three distinct layers: the chest, the thighs, and the shins, all aligned and in contact with the floor.
- Twisting split - An exercise in which the performer changes from a split with the left leg forward, to a straddle split, and then to a split with the right leg forward, by rotating the legs, and without using the hands for support.

== See also ==
- Artistic gymnastics
- Cirque du Soleil
- Rhythmic gymnastics
- Synchronised swimming
- Yoga

== Sources ==
- Louis, Michel (1974a). Contortionists. Contortionists. Vol. I. Europa Verlag.
- Louis, Michel (1974b). Contortionists. Contortionists. Vol. II. Europa Verlag.
