= Glamazon by Colorevolution =

- RuPaul's Drag Race episode
- Episode no.: Season 6 Episode 7
- Presented by: RuPaul
- Original air date: April 7, 2014

Guest appearances
- Lainie Kazan; Leah Remini

Episode chronology
← Previous "Oh No She Betta Don't!"	Next → "Drag Queens of Comedy"

"Glamazon by Colorevolution" is the seventh episode of the sixth season of the American television series RuPaul's Drag Race. It originally aired on April 7, 2014. The episode's main challenge tasks the contestants with filming infomercials for cosmetics products. Lainie Kazan and Leah Remini are guest judges. Laganja Estranja and Adore Delano win the main challenge. BenDeLaCreme and Darienne Lake place in the bottom and face off in a lip-sync contest to "Point of No Return" by Exposé, but no one is eliminated from the competition.

== Episode ==
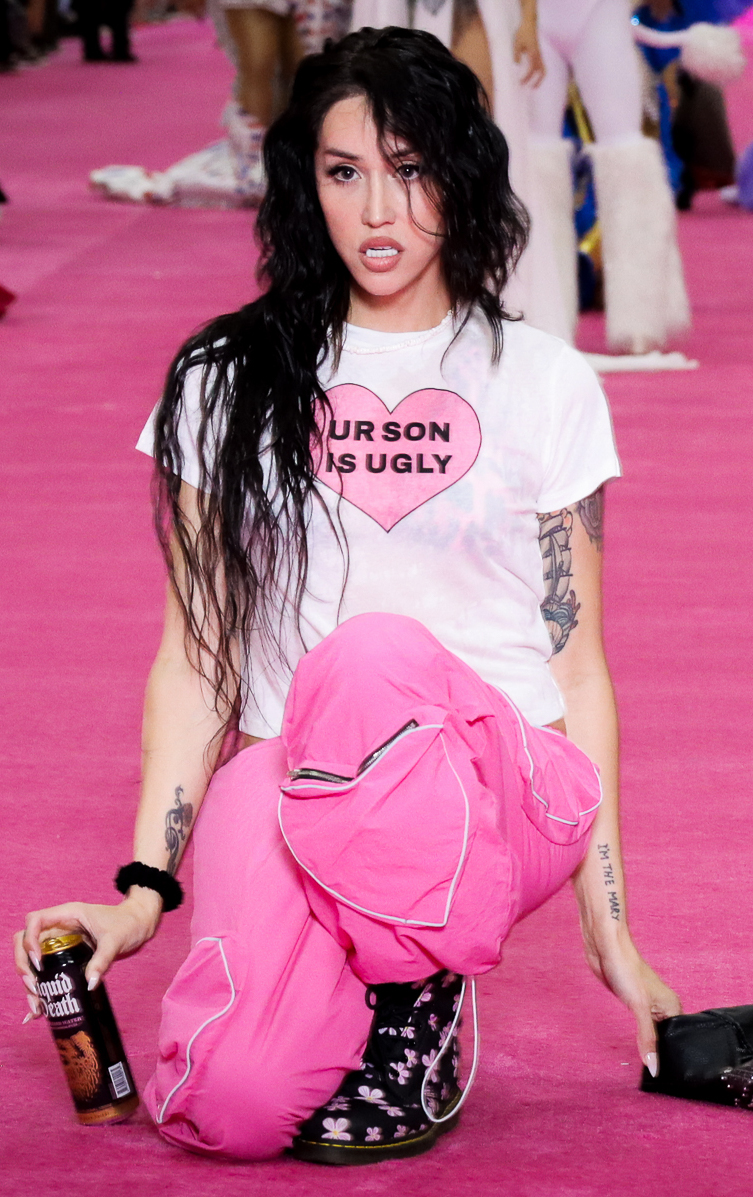
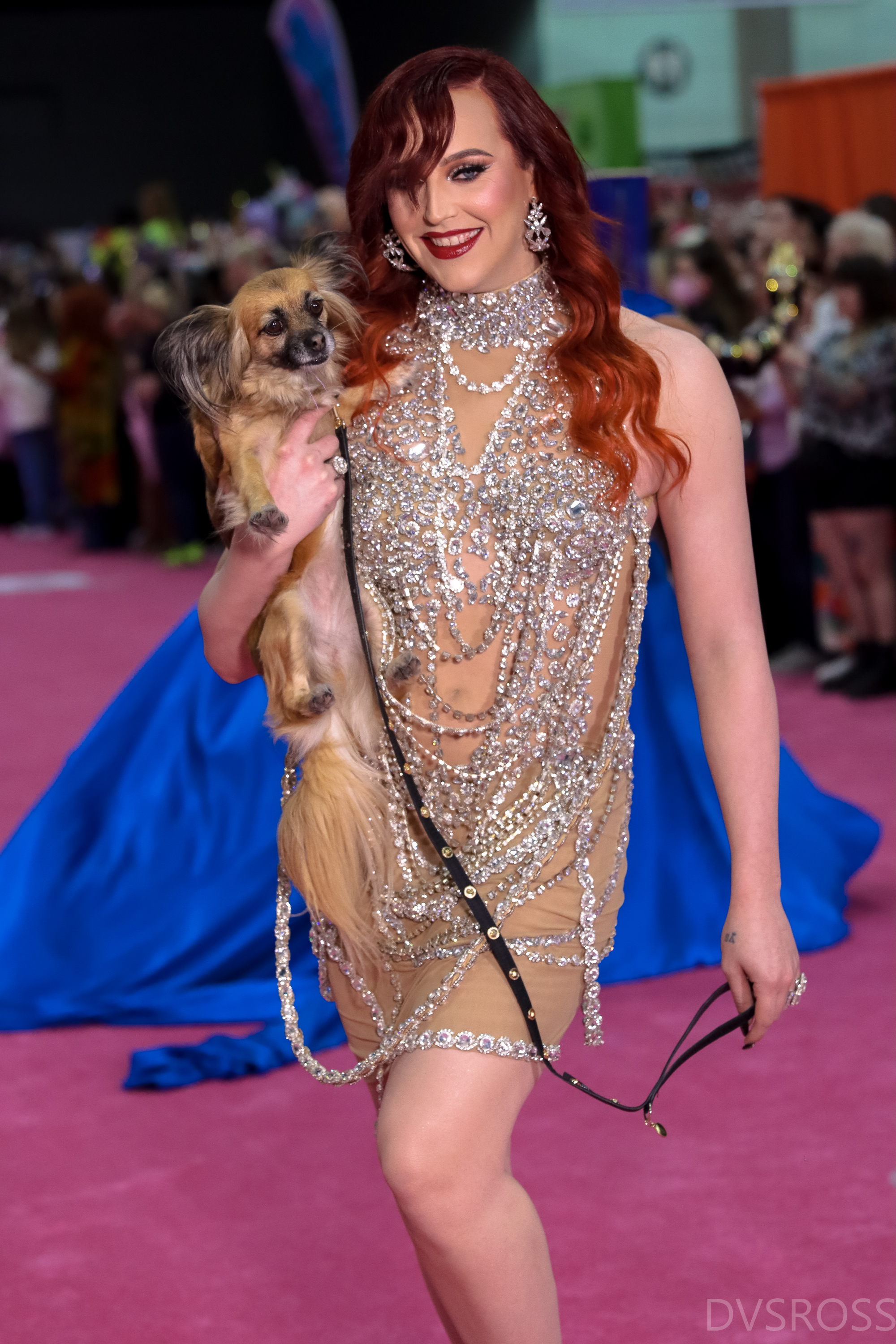
Adore Delano (left, pictured at RuPaul's DragCon LA in 2024) and Laganja Estranja (right, pictured at the same event in 2023) win the episode's main challenge.

The contestants return to the workroom after Milk's elimination on the previous episode. RuPaul greets the group and reveals the mini-challenge, which tasks the contestants with designing nails and hand modeling various fruits and vegetables. Laganja Estranja wins the mini-challenge. RuPaul then reveals the main challenge, which tasks the contestants with pairing up and filming an infomercial for RuPaul's Glamazon Cosmetics. The teams are Adore Delano and Laganja Estranja, BenDeLaCreme and Darienne Lake, Bianca Del Rio and Trinity K. Bonet, and Courtney Act and Joslyn Fox.

The pairs begin to rehearse in the workroom. RuPaul returns to meet with each team, asking questions and offering advice. The teams then film the commercials in front of a green screen with RuPaul and Michelle Visage as directors and members of the Pit Crew assisting. On elimination day, the contestants make final preparations in the workroom for the fashion show. There is tension between BenDeLaCreme and Darienne Lake.

On the main stage, RuPaul welcomes fellow judges Visage and Santino Rice, as well as guest judges Lainie Kazan and Leah Remini. RuPaul shares the assignment and runway category ("Black and White Drama"), then the fashion show commences. After the contestants present their looks, the contestants and judges watch the informercials. The judges deliver their critiques, deliberate, then share the results with the group. Adore Delano, Bianca Del Rio, Laganja Estranja, and Trinity K. Bonet receive positive critiques, and Adore Delano and Laganja Estranja both win the challenge. BenDeLaCreme, Courtney Act, Darienne Lake, and Joslyn Fox receive negative critiques, and Courtney Act and Joslyn Fox are deemed safe. BenDeLaCreme and Darienne Lake place in the bottom and face off in a lip-sync contest to "Point of No Return" (1985) by Exposé. Darienne Lake is declared the winner of the lip-sync, but BenDeLaCreme is saved and no one is eliminated from the competition.

== Production and broadcast ==
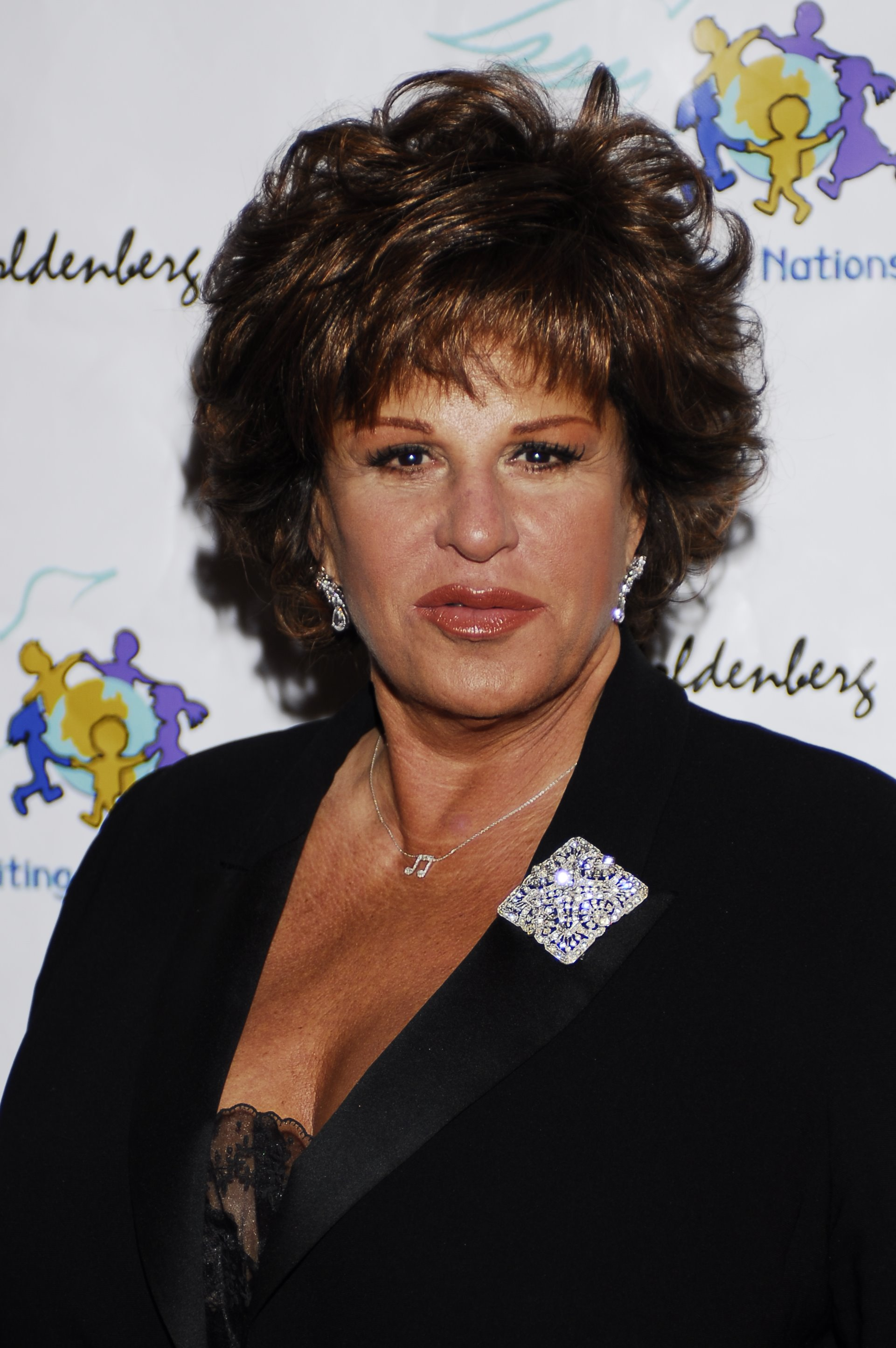
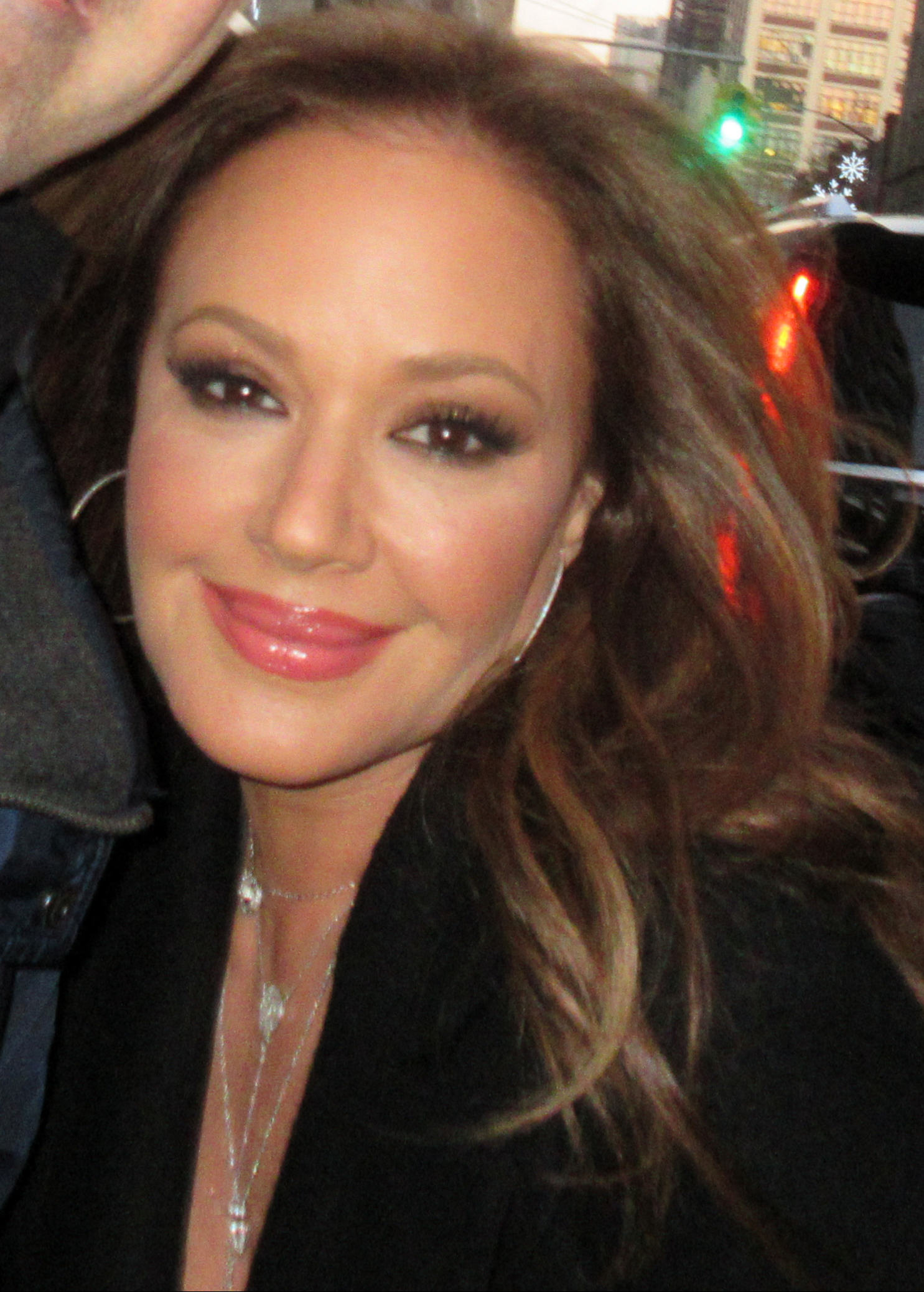
Lainie Kazan (left, pictured in 2007) and Leah Remini (right, pictured in 2018) are guest judges.

The episode originally aired on April 7, 2014. It was the show's fourth episode in which no contestant was eliminated.

=== Fashion ===
For the fashion show, Laganja Estranja has a tall and long wig. Adore Delano has a short dress and a black-and-white wig. Bianca Del Rio's dress is black on top and made of white tulle on the bottom. Trinity K. Bonet has a dice print on her dress and large earrings. BenDeLaCreme has an evil queen-inspired look with an embellished collar. Darienne Lake's dress is black on the bottom and white on the top. Courtney Act's cocktail waitress-inspired outfit has a bow tie and she carries a fish on a platter. Joslyn Fox wears a top hat with a white bow.

== Reception ==
Oliver Sava of The A.V. Club gave the episode a rating of 'A-'. Kevin O'Keeffe ranked the "Point of No Return" performance number 32 in INTO Magazine's 2018 "definitive ranking" of the show's lip-sync contests to date. Sam Brooks ranked the performance number 60 in The Spinoff's 2019 "definitive ranking" of the show's 162 lip-syncs to date, calling it "an example of literally one wrong move losing you a lip-sync". Bernardo Sim of Screen Rant called the lip-sync "iconic" in 2021. In 2023, Entertainment Weekly's Joey Nolfi called Darienne Lake's performance "iconic".
