= Reunited! (RuPaul's Drag Race season 6) =

Episode of RuPaul's Drag Race

- RuPaul's Drag Race episode
- Episode no.: Season 6 Episode 14
- Original air date: May 19, 2014

Episode chronology
← Previous "Countdown to the Crown"	Next → "Born Naked"
- RuPaul's Drag Race season 6

"Reunited!" is the fourteenth episode and finale of the sixth season of the American television series RuPaul's Drag Race. It was filmed at the Ace Hotel in downtown Los Angeles and originally aired on May 19, 2014. The episode sees the season's contestants reunite and the three finalists perform before a winner is crowned. BenDeLaCreme is named the season's Miss Congeniality and Bianca Del Rio wins the competition.

Former contestants Alaska, Jiggly Caliente, and Latrice Royale make guest appearances to ask questions from the audience. Ivy Winters and Jinkx Monsoon make appearances to announce this season's Miss Congeniality and competition winner, respectively.

== Episode ==
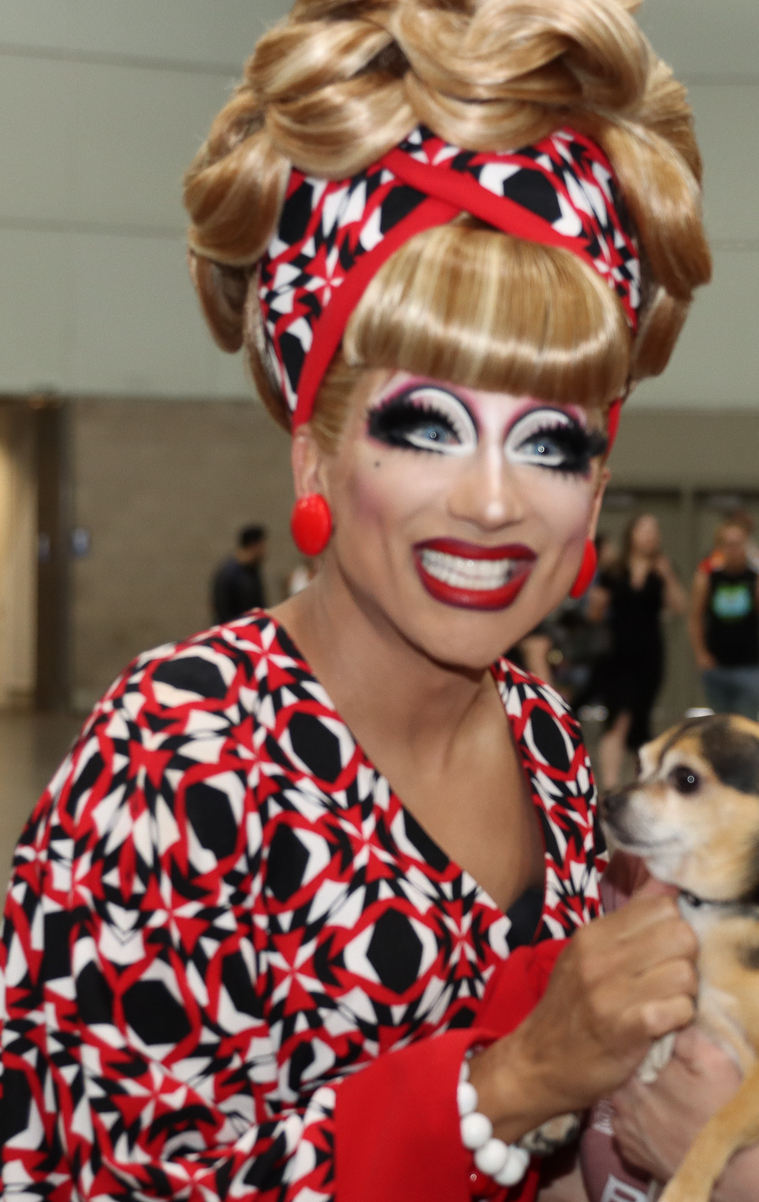
Bianca Del Rio (pictured in 2023) is crowned the season's winner.

From the Ace Hotel in downtown Los Angeles, all of the season's contestants return for the finale. The contestants perform choreography and present their looks individually on the runway. RuPaul enters the main stage, welcomes the audience, then takes a selfie with the contestants.

RuPaul interviews contestants, starting with Kelly Mantle and Magnolia Crawford, followed by Vivacious and April Carrión, then Gia Gunn and Milk, then Laganja Estranja and Trinity K. Bonet. RuPaul introduces a video montage about the history of drag, then RuPaul, the contestants, and the audience sing a song together. RuPaul interviews Joslyn Fox, BenDeLaCreme, and Darienne Lake, who receives a video message of support from her parents. The three finalists return to the stage and perform together. RuPaul introduces footage of a conflict between Adore Delano and Laganja Estranja, then the two contestants talk about their relationship.

From the audience, Latrice Royale, Alaska, and Jiggly Caliente ask questions to contestants. Joslyn Fox's fiancé Andre asks Joslyn Fox if she can get married. RuPaul officiates the wedding. Ivy Winters, last season's Miss Congeniality, returns to announce this season's title holder. BenDeLaCreme is named Miss Congeniality. RuPaul interviews the three finalists, as well as friends and family members in the audience, including Chaz Bono. Bianca Del Rio is declared the winner, making Adore Delano and Courtney Act the runners-up.

== Production and broadcast ==
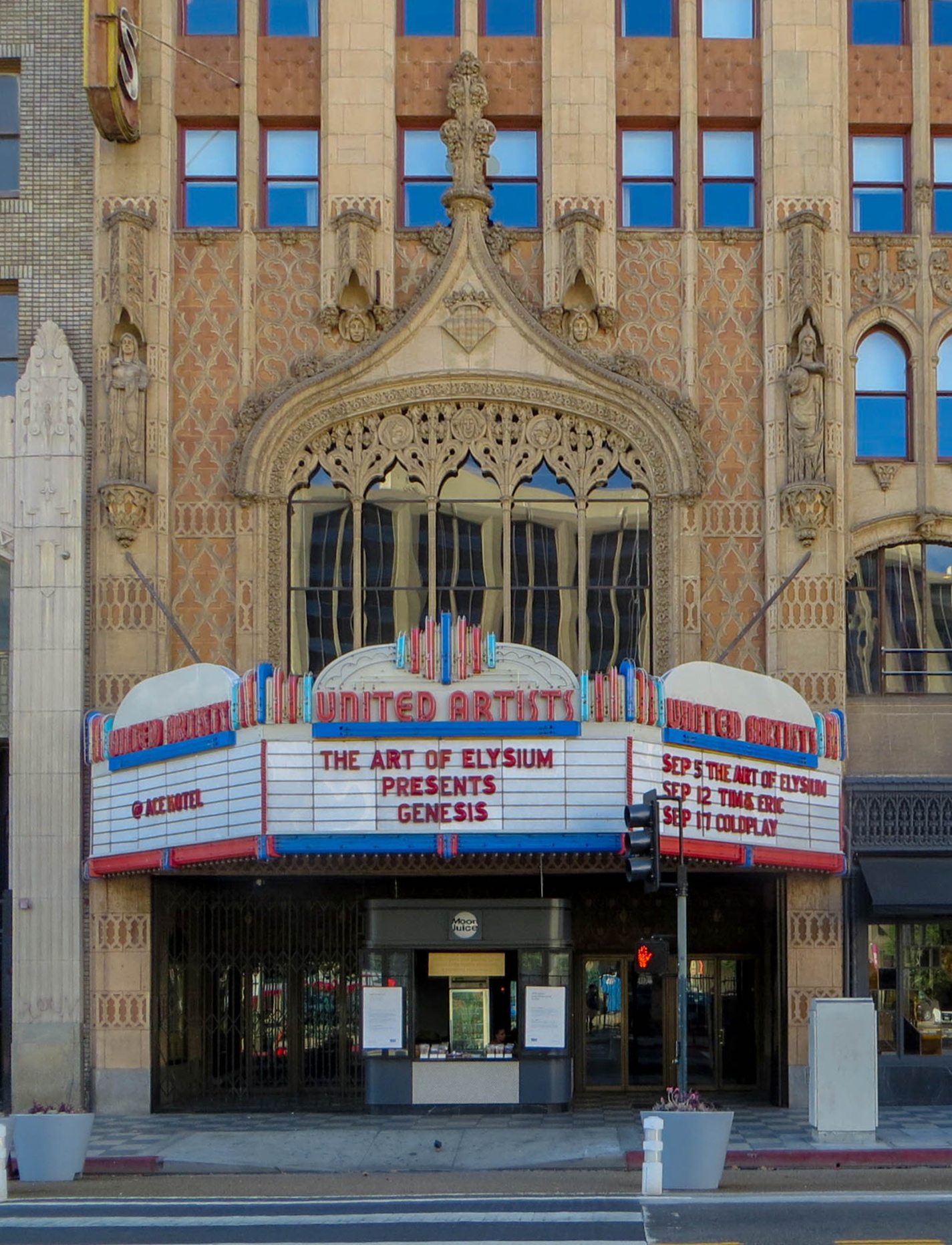
Exterior of the Ace Hotel theatre in Los Angeles, 2014

The episode originally aired on May 19, 2014.

In outros to commercial breaks, there are backup dancers. In one outro, the dancers wear figures of "Ornacia" on their heads (referencing an outfit previously worn by Vivacious). Among guests in the audience are judges Michelle Visage and Santino Rice, as well as former contestants such as Ongina and Victoria "Porkchop" Parker.

An alternative "tied win" was also filmed. The official finale viewing party was held at Tropicana Las Vegas.

=== Fashion ===
Kelly Mantle has a black dress and a red wig. Magnolia Crawford wears a colorful dress and a blonde wig. Vivacious has a gold-and-red dress with a gold headpiece. April Carrión has a gold outfit and a blonde wig. Gia Gunn wears a gold dress and a dark wig. Milk has a purple gown and a blonde wig. Laganja Estranja wears a purple and silver dress and a blonde wig. Trinity K. Bonet has a black dress and a long blonde wig. Joslyn Fox wears a gold dress and a red wig. BenDeLaCreme's dress is pink and gold and she has a dark wig. Darienne Lake's dress is black and she has a blonde wig. Adore Delano has a black-and-gold dress and a dark wig. Bianca Del Rio has a black dress and a matching headpiece. Courtney Act also as a black dress, a headpiece, and a blonde wig. RuPaul wears a blue dress and a blonde wig.

== Reception ==
Oliver Sava of The A.V. Club gave the episode a rating of 'A-'. In 2020, Bernardo Sim of Screen Rant wrote, "Many fans consider Drag Race season 6 the best year in the series. However, with such an exciting group of contestants and so much to talk about, the reunion certainly did not enter the herstory books." Sim gave the episode "middle-of-the-pack placement" in a list of the show's reunion episodes to date, opining: "It was fun to see more shadiness from Gia Gunn and Darienne Lake, as well as to get more quirkiness from BenDeLaCreme and Laganja Estranja. Moreover, it felt right for the show to prominently feature Vivacious and celebrate that style of drag. With that said, all of the great moments from season 6 of Drag Race happened throughout the season, which turned the reunion into more of a recap episode."
