= Oh No She Betta Don't! =

- RuPaul's Drag Race episode
- Episode no.: Season 6 Episode 6
- Presented by: RuPaul
- Original air date: March 31, 2014

Guest appearances
- Eve; Trina

Episode chronology
← Previous "Snatch Game"	Next → "Glamazon by Colorevolution"

"Oh No She Betta Don't!" is the sixth episode of the sixth season of the American television series RuPaul's Drag Race. It originally aired on March 31, 2014. The episode's main challenge tasks the contestants with writing, recording, and performing original verses to the song "Oh No She Betta Don't". Eve and Trina are guest judges. Adore Delano wins the main challenge. Milk is eliminated from the competition after placing in the bottom and losing a lip-sync contest against Trinity K. Bonet to "Whatta Man" (1993) by Salt-N-Pepa with En Vogue.

== Episode ==
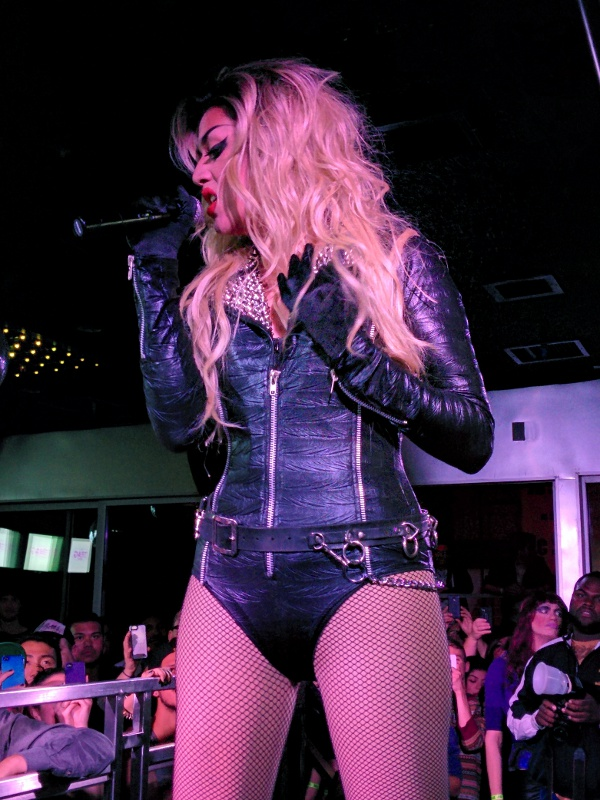
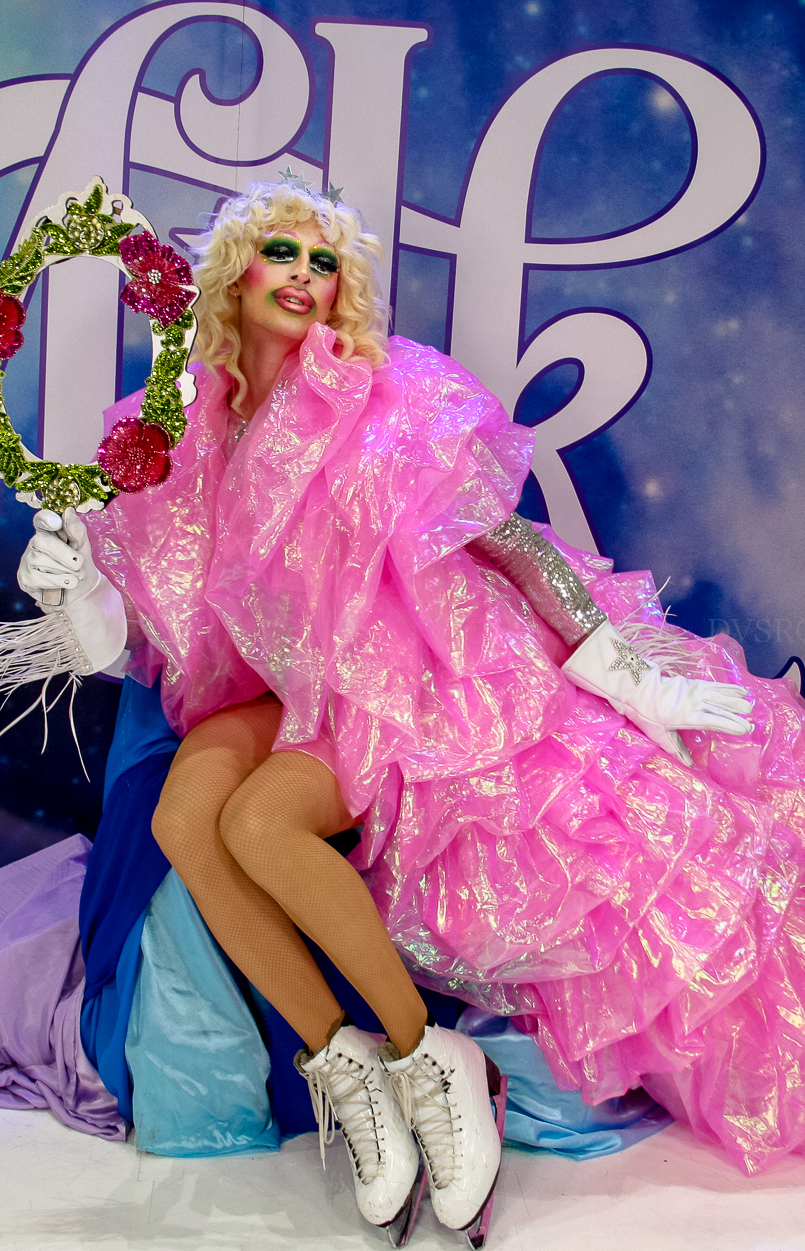
Adore Delano (pictured in 2014) wins the episode's main challenge; Milk (pictured at RuPaul's DragCon LA in 2019) is eliminated from the competition.

The contestants return to the workroom after Gia Gunn's elimination on the previous episode. Trinity K. Bonet discusses her HIV status. On a new day, RuPaul greets the group and reveals the mini-challenge, which tasks the contestants with "reading" (or playfully insulting) each other. Darienne Lake wins the mini-challenge. RuPaul reveals the main challenge, which tasks the contestants with writing, recording, and performing original verses to "Oh No She Betta Don't". As the winner of the mini-challenge, Darienne Lake gets to select her teammates. Team Panty Ho's includes Adore Delano, Bianca Del Rio, Courtney Act, Darienne Lake, and Laganja Estranja. Team Ru-Tang Clan includes BenDeLaCreme, Joslyn Fox, Milk, and Trinity K. Bonet.

The contestants begin to rehearse in the workroom. RuPaul returns and reveals that Eve and Trina will help with the challenge. The contestants get into drag for the rap performances, then film with Eve and Trina. On elimination day, the contestants make final preparations for the fashion show. Bianca Del Rio praises Trinity K. Bonet for sharing about her HIV status. Bianca Del Rio also discusses the death of a friend who had HIV/AIDS.

On the main stage, RuPaul welcomes fellow judges Michelle Visage and Santino Rice, as well as guest judges Eve and Trina. RuPaul reveals the runway category ("Crazy, Sexy, Cool", placing emphasis on favorite body parts), then the fashion show commences. After the contestants present their looks, the group watch the rap performances. The judges deliver their critiques, deliberate, then share the results with the group. Adore Delano, Bianca Del Rio, and Joslyn Fox receive positive critiques, and Adore Delano wins the challenge. Darienne Lake, Milk, and Trinity K. Bonet receive negative critiques, and Darienne Lake is deemed safe. Milk and Trinity K. Bonet place in the bottom and face off in a lip-sync contest to "Whatta Man" (1993) by Salt-N-Pepa with En Vogue. Trinity K. Bonet wins the lip-sync and Milk is eliminated from the competition.

== Production and broadcast ==
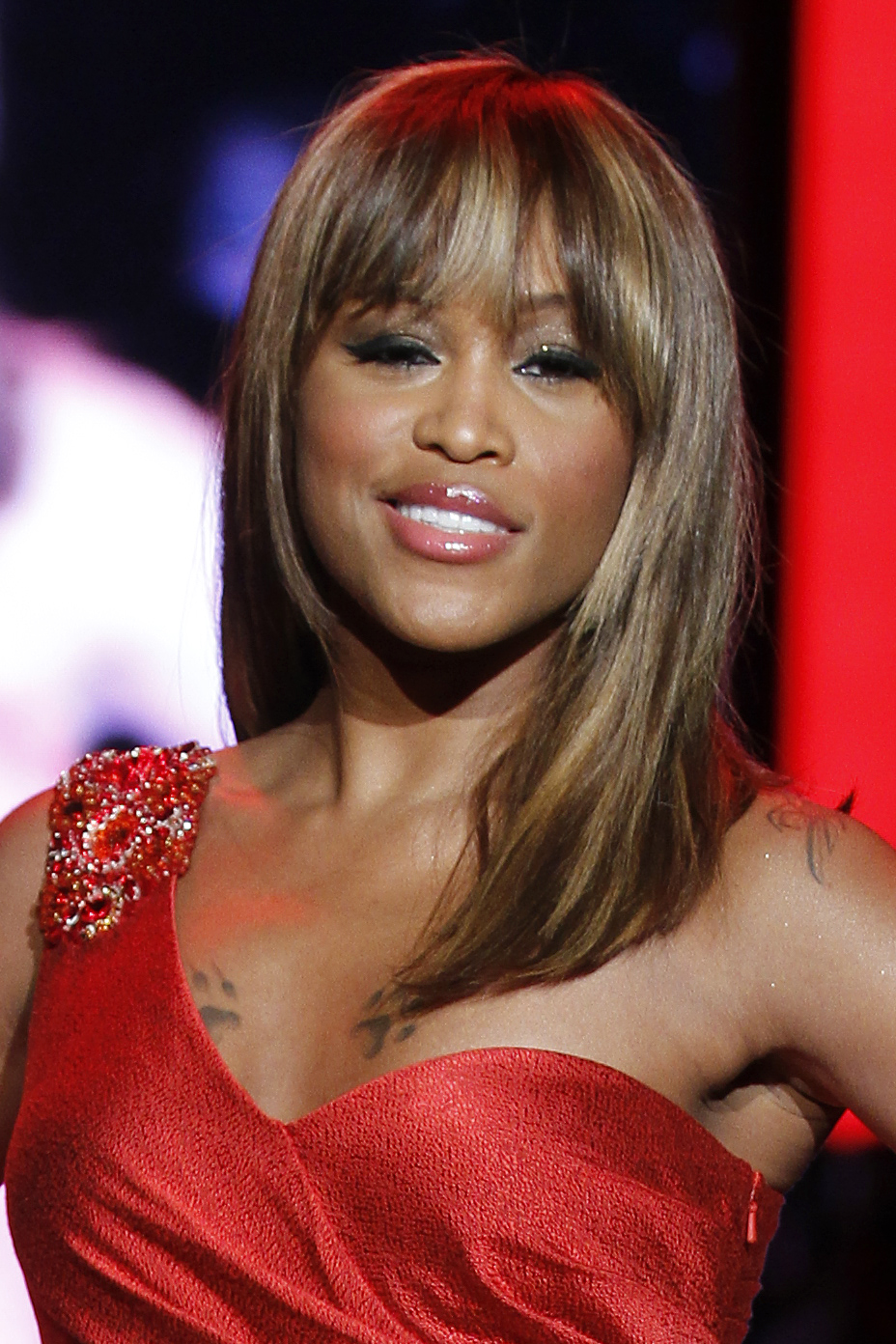
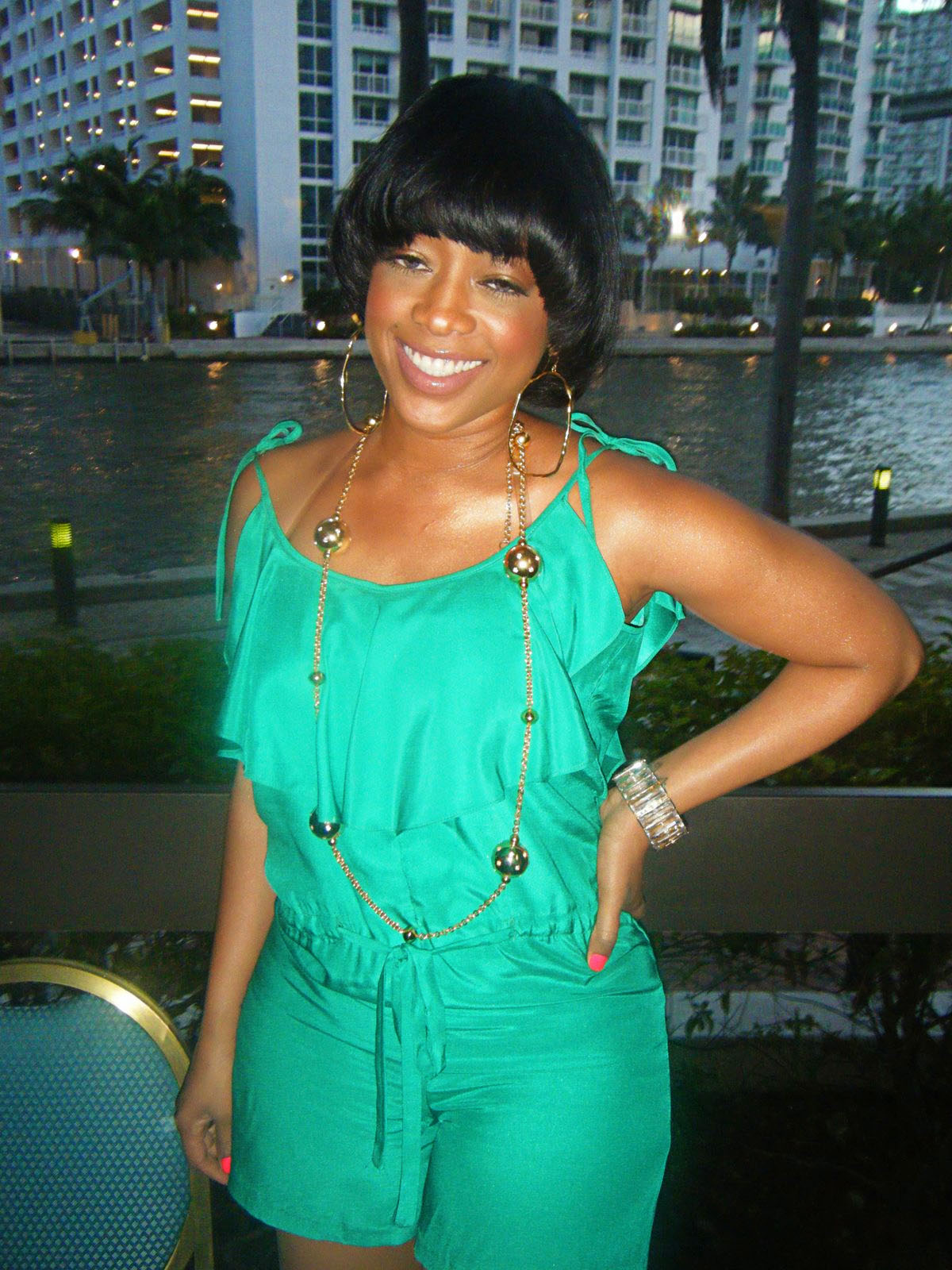
Eve (left) and Trina (right) are guest judges.

The episode originally aired on March 31, 2014.

=== Fashion ===
For the main stage, RuPaul wears a green dress and a red wig. Joslyn Fox wears an outfit with straps and tall black boots. BenDeLaCreme has a light blue dress with animal print and a matching hat. Trinity K. Bonet wears a hippie-inspired outfit and a long dark wig. Milk has a light blue dress, a blonde wig, and a bow in her hair. Laganja Estranja has a black outfit and tall shoes. Darienne Lake has jewels on her black dress and a blonde wig. Bianca Del Rio's dress is gold and she wears large earrings and a brown wig. Adore Delano's outfit is black. She is matching boots and gloves, plus a blonde wig. Courtney Act enters with a cover resembling a comforter, which she removes to reveal a purple swimsuit.

== Reception ==
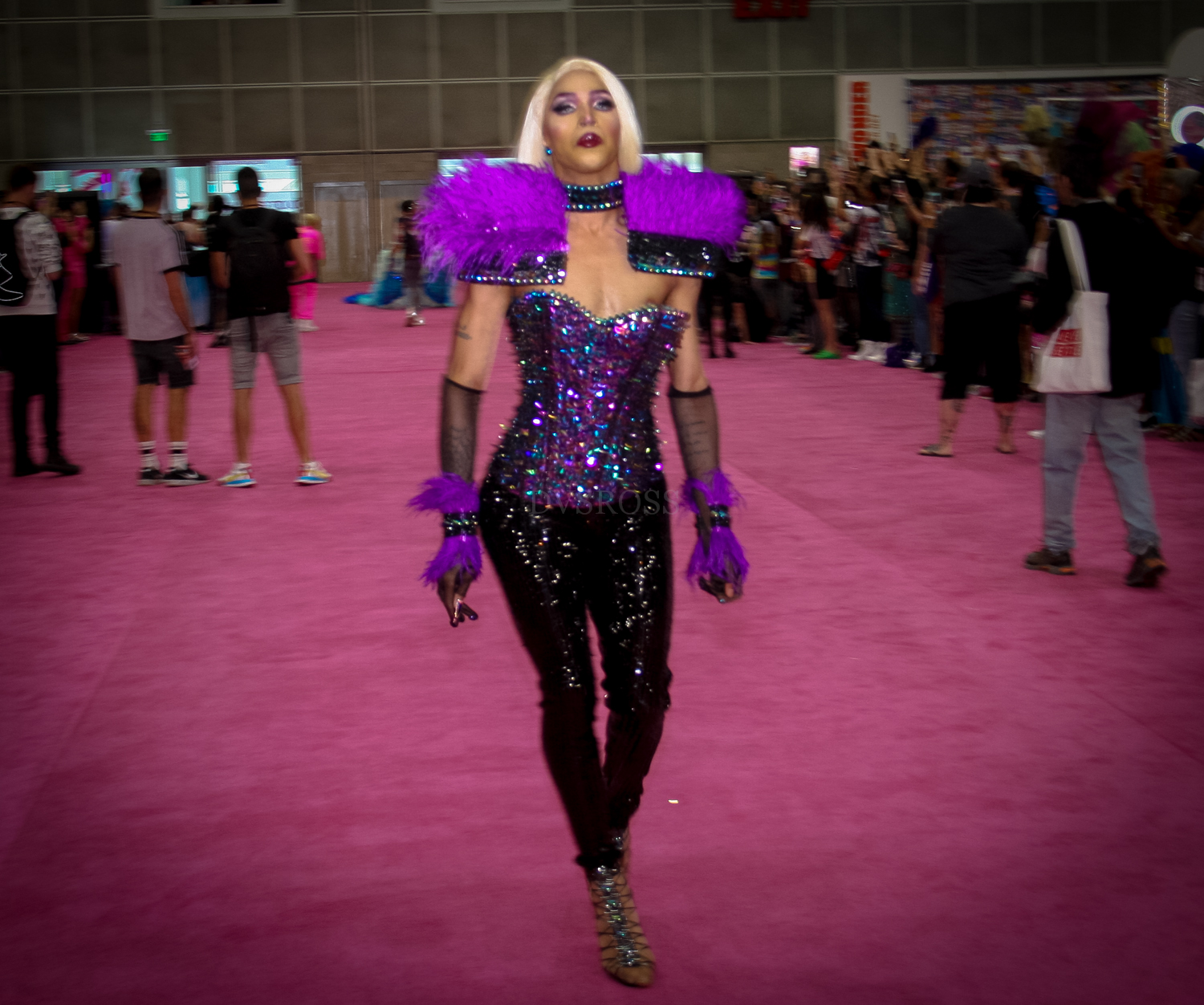
Trinity K. Bonet (pictured at RuPaul's DragCon LA in 2019) was praised for her performance during the lip-sync contest.

Oliver Sava of The A.V. Club gave the episode a rating of "B+". Matthew Tharrett of Queerty called the challenge "really underwhelming and rushed".

Sam Brooks ranked the "Whatta Man" performance 44 in The Spinoff's 2019 "definitive ranking" of the show's 162 lip-sync contests to date. David Levesley included the performance in GQ's 2019 overview of "the best lip syncs to watch if you want to get a real grip of the show", calling it the "best for sexuality vs comedy". Levesley wrote, "In 'Whatta Man', [Trinity K. Bonet] faces off against weirdo and consummate zaddy Milk: the latter chooses to play it as a comedy while Trinity gives you sex on a platter. It's a tale as old as time: playing a lip sync straight will always impress Ru over making it a parody of itself." In TV Guide's 2019 list of the show's thirteen best lip-syncs, Keisha Hatchett wrote: "Trinity K. Bonet's sultry performance of Salt-N-Pepa's 'Whatta Man' will be forever ingrained in our minds. By perfectly embodying the classic jam's laid-back vibe while adding her own spin, she really owned the lip sync and delivered something worth remembering." Bernardo Sim included the contest in Pride.com's 2023 list of the best lip-syncs from each season of the show, writing: "After struggling with so many of the challenges in that season, Bonet came alive during this lip sync and showed the judges what an incredible talent she is. Overall, this was one of the most thrilling and titillating lip syncs in Drag Race herstory."
