= Snatch Game (RuPaul's Drag Race season 6) =

- RuPaul's Drag Race episode
- Episode no.: Season 6 Episode 5
- Original air date: March 24, 2014

Guest appearances
- Gillian Jacobs; Heather McDonald

Episode chronology
← Previous "Shade: The Rusical"	Next → "Oh No She Betta Don't!"
- RuPaul's Drag Race season 6

"Snatch Game" is the fifth episode of the sixth season of the American television series RuPaul's Drag Race. It originally aired on March 24, 2014. The episode's main challenge tasks the contestants with impersonating celebrities in the Snatch Game. Gillian Jacobs and Heather McDonald are guest judges. BenDeLaCreme win's the main challenge. Gia Gunn is eliminated from the competition after placing in the bottom and losing a lip-sync contest against Laganja Estranja to "Head to Toe" by Lisa Lisa & Cult Jam.

== Episode ==
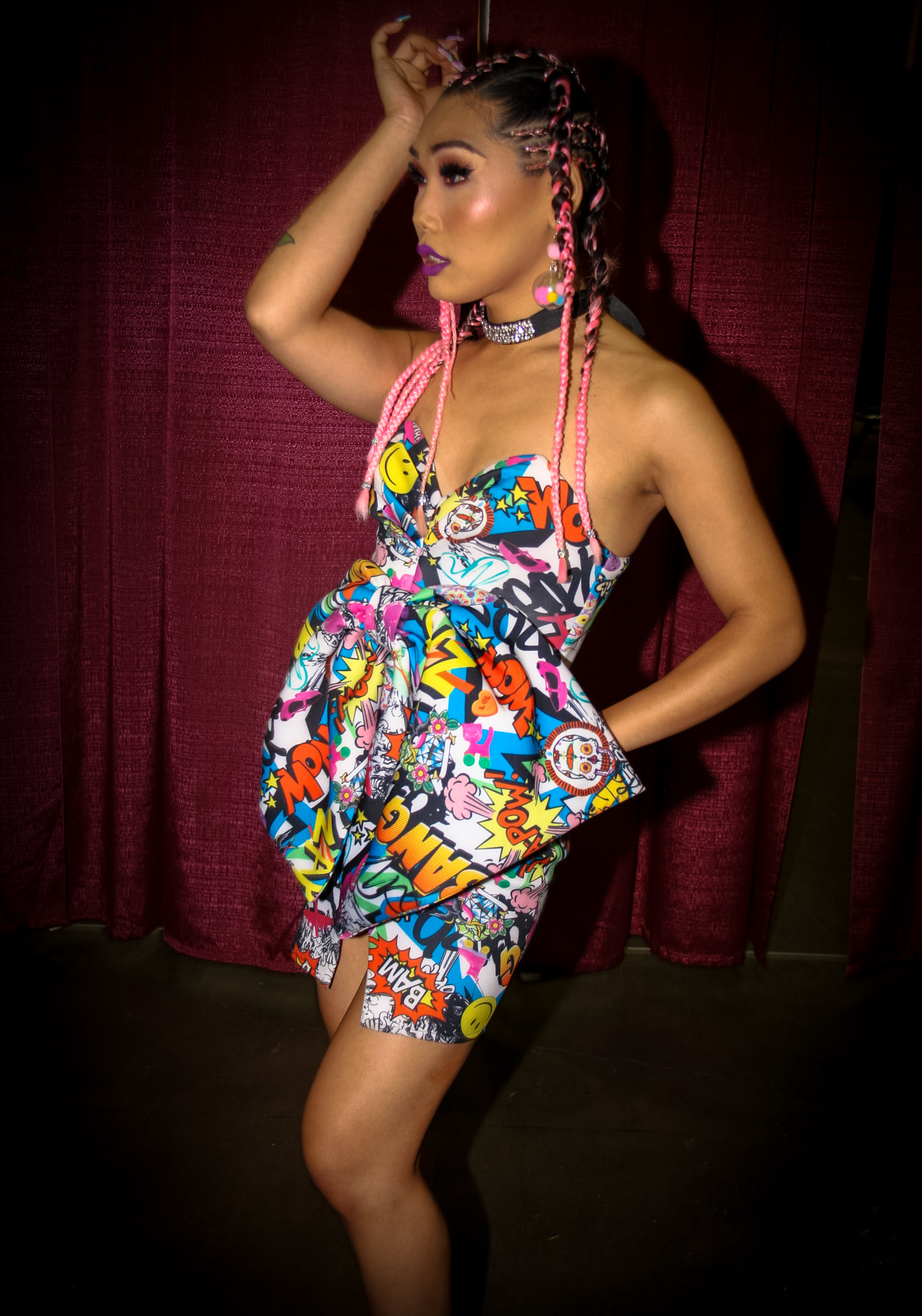
Gia Gunn is eliminated from the competition.

The contestants return to the workroom after April Carrión's elimination on the previous episode. On a new day, RuPaul greets the group and reveals the main challenge, which tasks the contestants with impersonating celebrities in the Snatch Game.

The contestants start to prepare for the game. RuPaul returns to the workroom to meet with each contestant, asking questions and offering advice. Before leaving, RuPaul shares the runway category ("Night of a Thousand Ru's"). The contestants make final preparations, then the game commences with Gillian Jacobs and Heather McDonald as celebrity guests. Following are the contestants and impersonated celebrities:

- Adore Delano as Anna Nicole Smith
- BenDeLaCreme as Maggie Smith
- Bianca Del Rio as Judge Judy
- Courtney Act as Fran Drescher
- Darienne Lake as Paula Deen
- Gia Gunn as Kim Kardashian
- Joslyn Fox as Teresa Giudice
- Laganja Estranja as Rachel Zoe
- Milk as Julia Child
- Trinity K. Bonet as Nicki Minaj

On elimination day, the contestants make final preparations for the fashion show. The group discuss body image and self-confidence. On the main stage, RuPaul welcomes fellow judges Michelle Visage and Santino Rice, as well as guest judges Jacobs and MacDonald. RuPaul shares the assignment of the main challenge and the runway category, then the fashion show commences. The judges deliver their critiques, deliberate, and share the results with the contestants. BenDeLaCreme is declared the winner. Gia Gunn and Laganja Estranja place in the bottom and face off in a lip-sync contest to "Head to Toe" (1987) by Lisa Lisa & Cult Jam. Laganja Estranja wins the lip-sync and Gia Gunn is eliminated from the competition.

== Production and broadcast ==
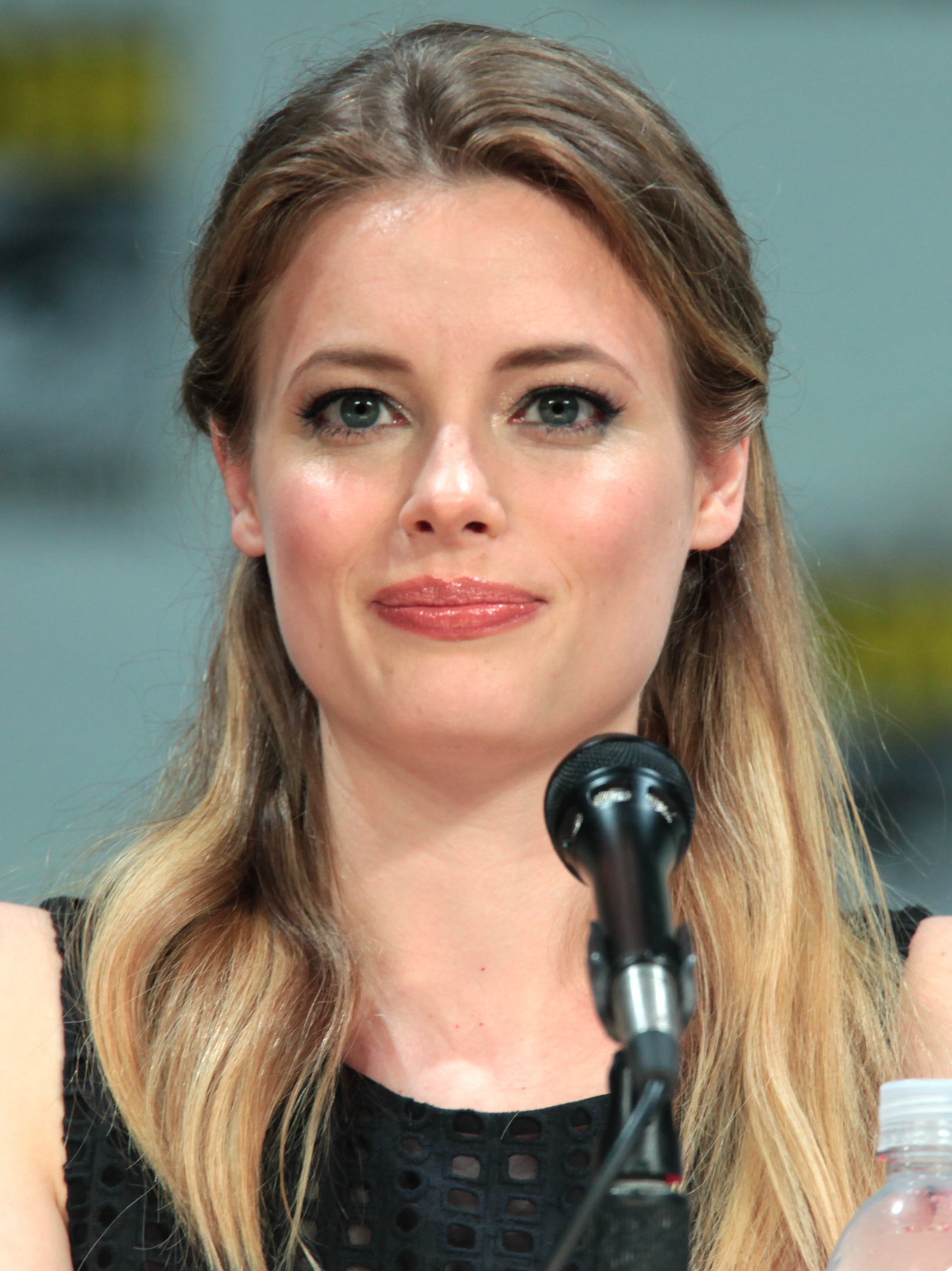
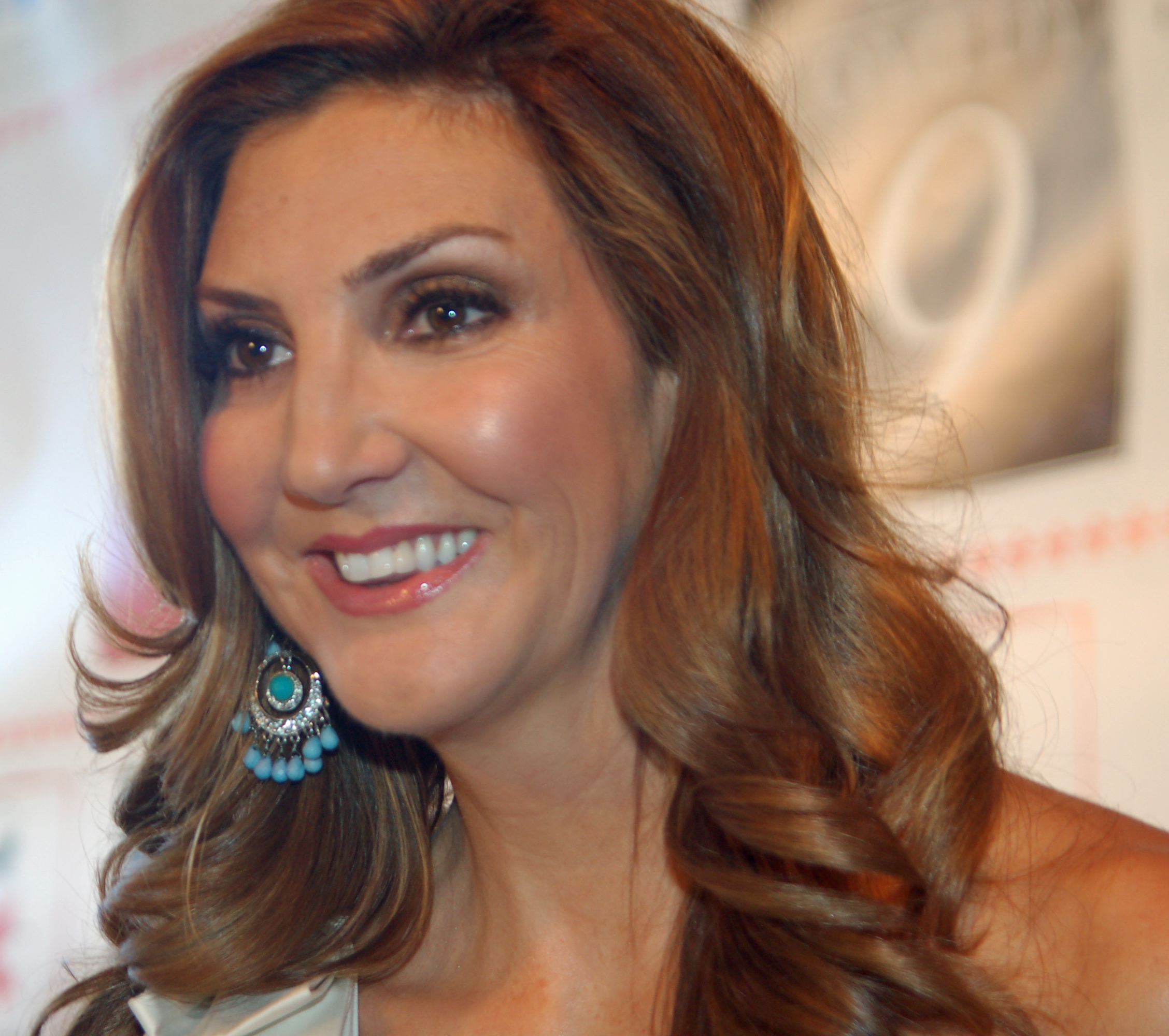
Gillian Jacobs (left) and Heather McDonald (right) are guest judges.

The episode originally aired on March 24, 2014.

=== Fashion ===
For the fashion show, Joslyn Fox has a black dress with a matching headpiece. Gia Gunn wears a blue dress and a large blonde wig. Darienne Lake has an Eartha Kitt-inspired dark outfit and a blonde wig. Laganja Estranja wears a black-and-purple outfit and a large blonde wig. Bianca Del Rio has a silver dress with matching accessories. Adore Delano wears a purple dress and a large blonde wig. Trinity K. Bonet has a green-and-white dress with feathers and a dark wig. BenDeLaCreme wears a yellow dress with a matching headpiece and a blonde wig. Courtney Act has a short dress with a cape resembling wings. Milk has a blue suit and glasses.

== Reception ==
Oliver Sava of The A.V. Club gave the episode a rating of 'A'. Kevin O'Keeffe ranked the "Head to Toe" performance number 102 in INTO Magazine's 2018 "definitive ranking" of the show's lip-sync contests to date. Sam Brooks ranked the contest number 121 in The Spinoff's 2019 "definitive ranking" of the show's 162 lip-syncs to date.
