= Drag Queens of Comedy =

- RuPaul's Drag Race episode
- Episode no.: Season 6 Episode 8
- Presented by: RuPaul
- Original air date: April 7, 2014

Guest appearances
- Jaime Pressly; Bruce Vilanch

Episode chronology
← Previous "Glamazon by Colorevolution"	Next → "Queens of Talk"

"Drag Queens of Comedy" is the eighth episode of the sixth season of the American television series RuPaul's Drag Race. It originally aired on April 7, 2014. The episode's main challenge tasks the contestants with performing stand-up comedy for the judges and a live audience. Actress Jaime Pressly and comedian Bruce Vilanch are guest judges. Bianca Del Rio wins the main challenge. Laganja Estranja is eliminated from the competition after placing in the bottom and losing a lip-sync contest against Joslyn Fox to "Stupid Girls" by Pink.

== Episode ==
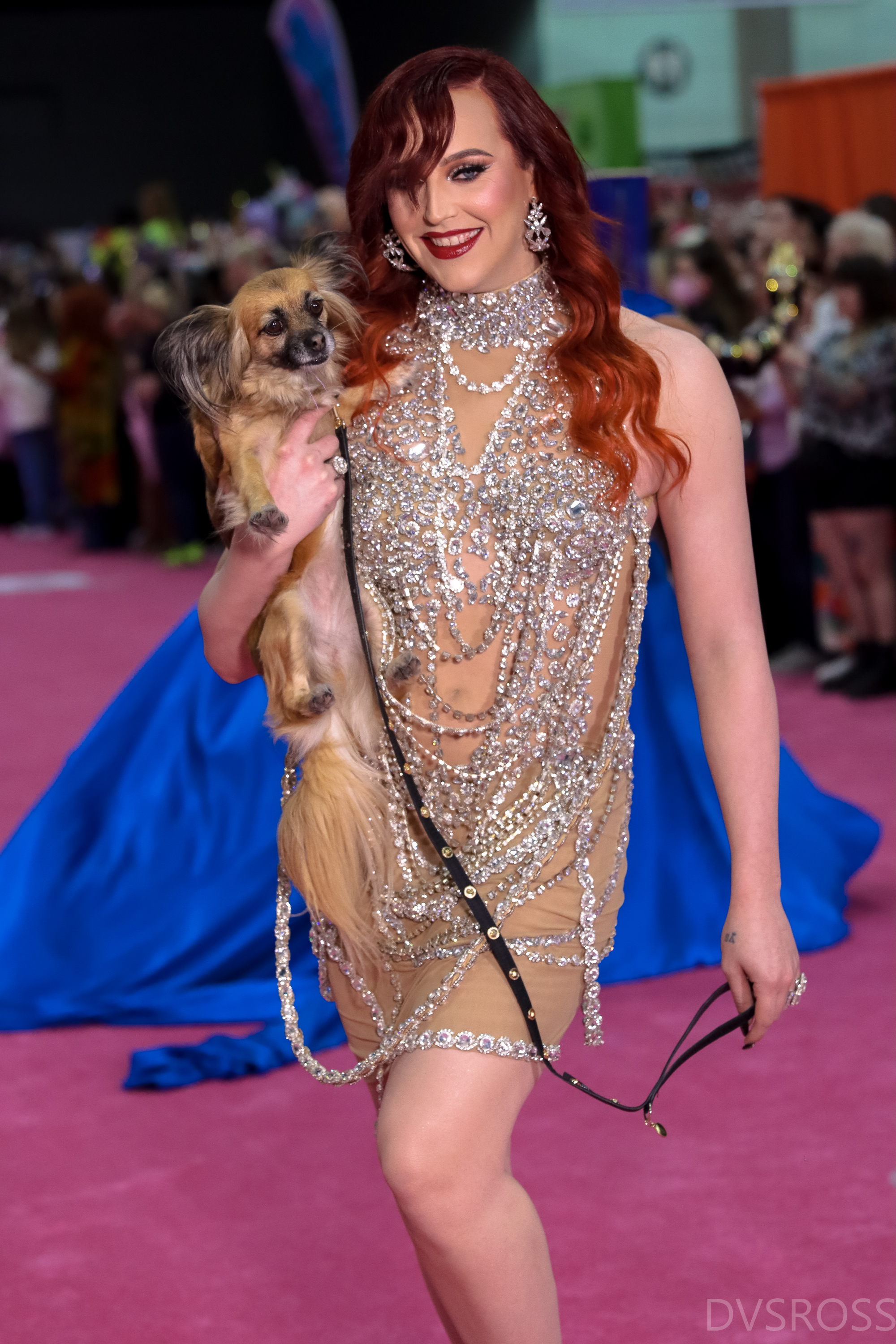
Laganja Estranja is eliminated from the competition.

The contestants return to the workroom after no one was eliminated on the previous episode. On a new day, RuPaul greets the group and reveals the mini-challenge, which tasks the contestants with lip-syncing upside-down to a RuPaul song. Joslyn Fox wins the mini-challenge. RuPaul reveals the main challenge, which tasks the contestants with performing stand-up comedy for judges and a live audience. As the winner of the mini-challenge, Joslyn Fox gets to decide the line-up order. The contestants begin to write their scripts. RuPaul returns to meet with each contestants individually, asking questions and offering advice. Before leaving, RuPaul reveals that the audience will be made of seniors. Joslyn Fox shares her decision about the line-up order.

On elimination day, the contestants make final preparations in the workroom for the comedy and fashion shows. Joslyn Fox talks about her relationship with her grandparents. On the main stage, RuPaul welcomes fellow judges Michelle Visage and Santino Rice, as well as guest judges Jaime Pressly and Bruce Vilanch. RuPaul shares the assignment, then the comedy show commences. The judges deliver their critiques, deliberate, then share the results with the group. Bianca Del Rio, Darienne Lake, and Trinity K. Bonet receive positive critiques, and Bianca Del Rio wins the challenge. BenDeLaCreme, Joslyn Fox, and Laganja Estranja receive negative critiques, and BenDeLaCreme is deemed safe. Joslyn Fox and Laganja Estranja place in the bottom and face off in a lip-sync contest to "Stupid Girls" (2006) by Pink. Joslyn Fox wins the lip-sync and Laganja Estranja is eliminated from the competition.

== Production and broadcast ==
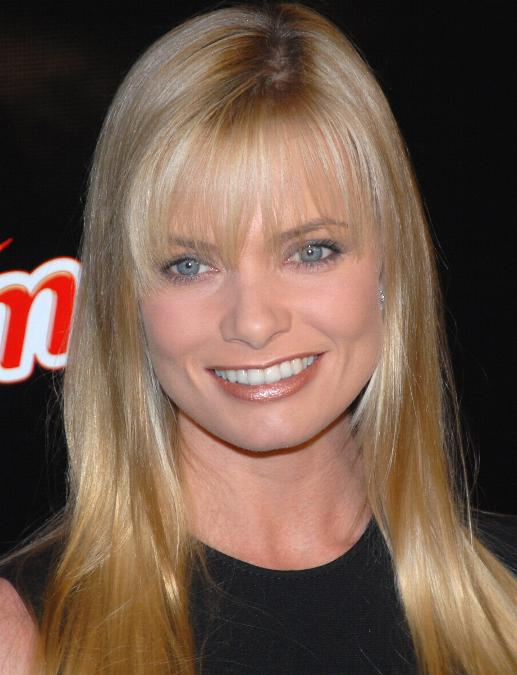
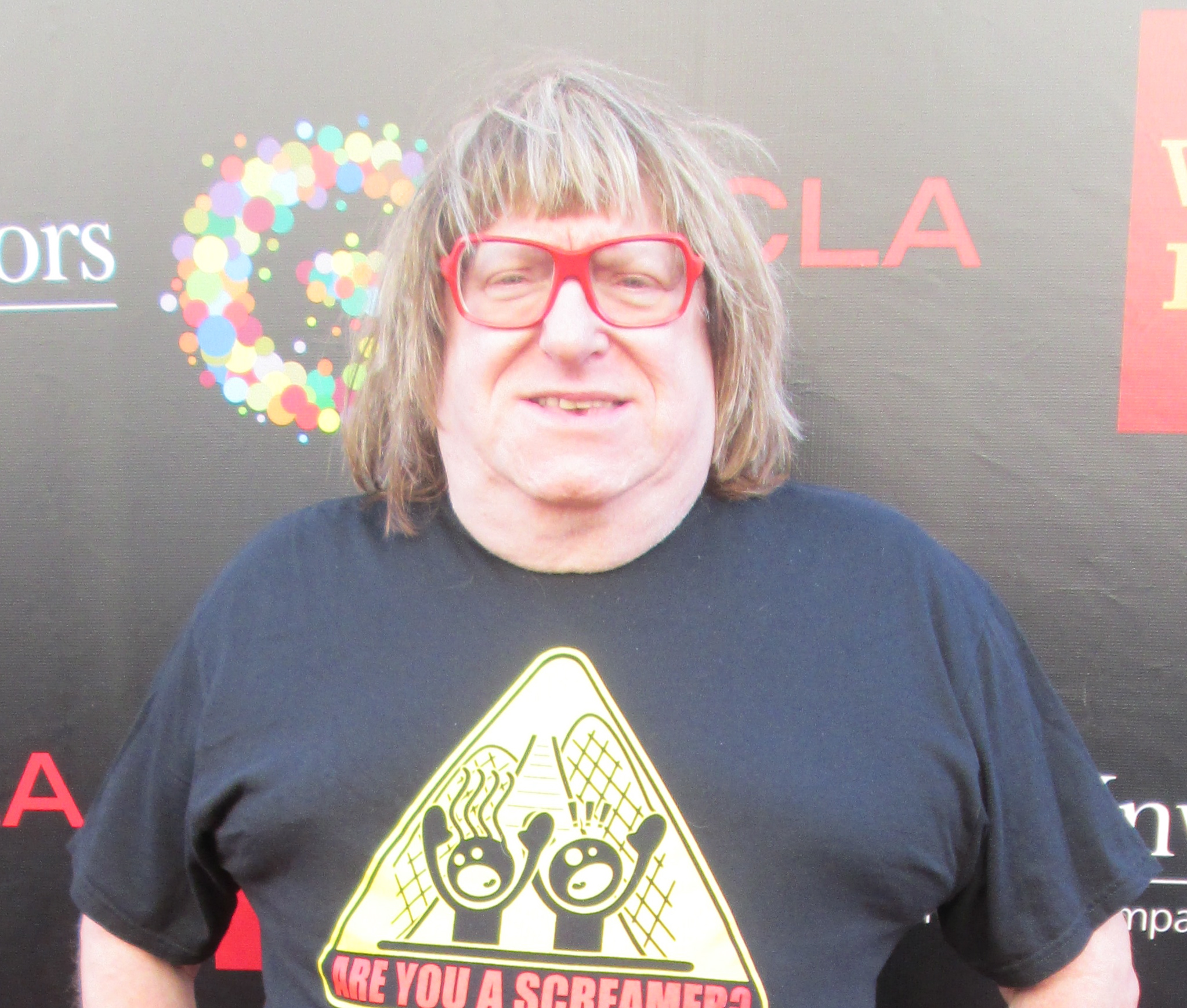
Jaime Pressly (top) and Bruce Vilanch (bottom) are guest judges.

The episode originally aired on April 7, 2014.

Both contestants perform a split during the final lip-sync contest.

=== Fashion ===
Adore Delano has a striped dress and a small hat on the top of her head. BenDeLaCreme has a short red dress and a matching headband. Bianca Del Rio wears a colorful long dress and a red wig. Courtney Act wears a black-and-gold outfit and a blonde wig. Joslyn Fox has a black-and-tan dress. Laganja Estranja has a colorful outfit with a purple tutu and a large pink wig, which she removes to reveal a short wig with a purple streak. Trinity K. Bonet colorful short dress and a short dark wig.

== Reception ==
Oliver Sava of The A.V. Club gave the episode a rating of 'A'. Katie Walsh of Slate described the final lip-sync contest as "organic, unplanned, unproduced, unadulterated talent that displays how lip-syncing is a skill, not just a party trick". Jeremy Feist of Xtra Magazine and Chiffon Dior of Werrrk called the simultaneously double split "epic" and "spectacular", respectively. In 2016, Brian Moylan of The Guardian opined, "Laganja Estranga was perhaps the most annoying thing on television since that never-ending beep that announces a test of the emergency broadcast system. But when she and Joslyn Fox did unplanned simultaneous splits while performing Pink's Stupid Girls during season six, it was the kind of moment that made everyone watching jump up off the couch and wag their fingers at the screen. Also, Laganja was sent packing after this number, so it is a twice blessed event." Kevin O'Keeffe ranked the performance number 13 in INTO Magazine's 2018 "definitive ranking" of the show's lip-syncs to date. Sam Brooks ranked the performance number 79 in The Spinoff's 2019 "definitive ranking" of the show's 162 lip-syncs to date. Keisha Hatchett ranked the performance twelfth in TV Guide's 2019 list of the show's best lip-syncs to date.
