= Queens of Talk =

- RuPaul's Drag Race episode
- Episode no.: Season 6 Episode 9
- Presented by: RuPaul
- Original air date: April 14, 2014

Guest appearances
- Paula Abdul; Chaz Bono; Georgia Holt

Episode chronology
← Previous "Drag Queens of Comedy"	Next → "Drag My Wedding"

"Queens of Talk" is the ninth episode of the sixth season of the American television series RuPaul's Drag Race. It originally aired on April 14, 2014. Paula Abdul, Chaz Bono, and Georgia Holt are guest judges, with the latter two being interviewed as part of the main challenge.

Courtney Act wins the episode's main challenge. Trinity K. Bonet is eliminated from the competition after placing in the bottom and losing a lip-sync contest against Adore Delano to "Vibeology" by Abdul.

== Episode ==
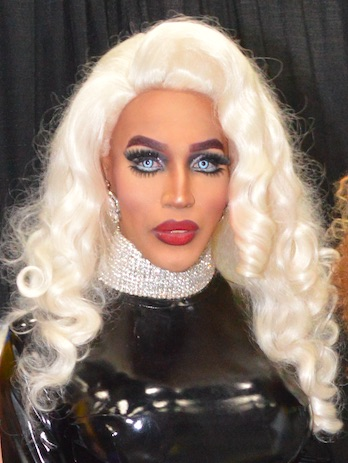
Trinity K. Bonet (pictured at RuPaul's DragCon LA in 2018) is eliminated from the competition.

The contestants return to the workroom after Laganja Estranja's elimination on the previous episode. On a new day, RuPaul greets the group and reveals the mini-challenge, which tasks the contestants with playing a hangman-inspired game called "Hung Men" with members of the Pit Crew. BenDeLaCreme wins the mini-challenge. RuPaul then reveals the main challenge, which tasks the contestants with hosting The RuPaul Show and interviewing guests Chaz Bono and Georgia Holt. The contestants begin to research the guests and otherwise prepare for the talk show. RuPaul returns to meet with the contestants individually, asking questions and offering advice. Before leaving, RuPaul reveals that Paula Abdul is a guest judge.

The contestants each interview Bono and Holt. On the main stage, RuPaul welcomes fellow judge Michelle Visage and Santino Rice, as well as guest judges Abdul, Bono, and Holt. RuPaul shares the assignment and runway category ("Animal Kingdom Couture"), then the fashion show commences. After the contestants present their looks, the judges deliver their critiques, deliberate, then share the results with the group. BenDeLaCreme and Courtney Act receive positive critiques, and Courtney Act wins the challenge. Adore Delano, Joslyn Fox, and Trinity K. Bonet receive negative critiques, and Joslyn Fox is deemed safe. Adore Delano and Trinity K. Bonet place in the bottom and face off in a lip-sync contest to "Vibeology" (1991) by Abdul. Adore Delano wins the lip-sync and Trinity K. Bonet is eliminated from the competition.

== Production and broadcast ==
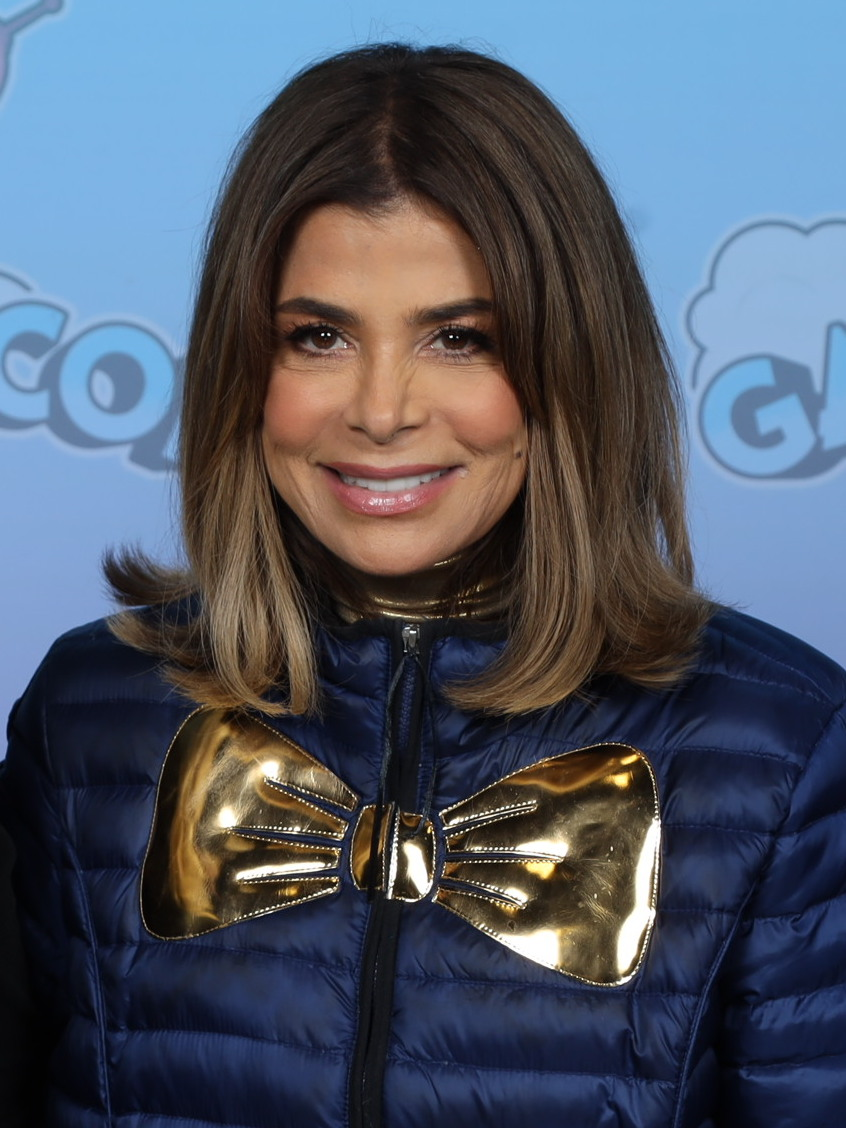
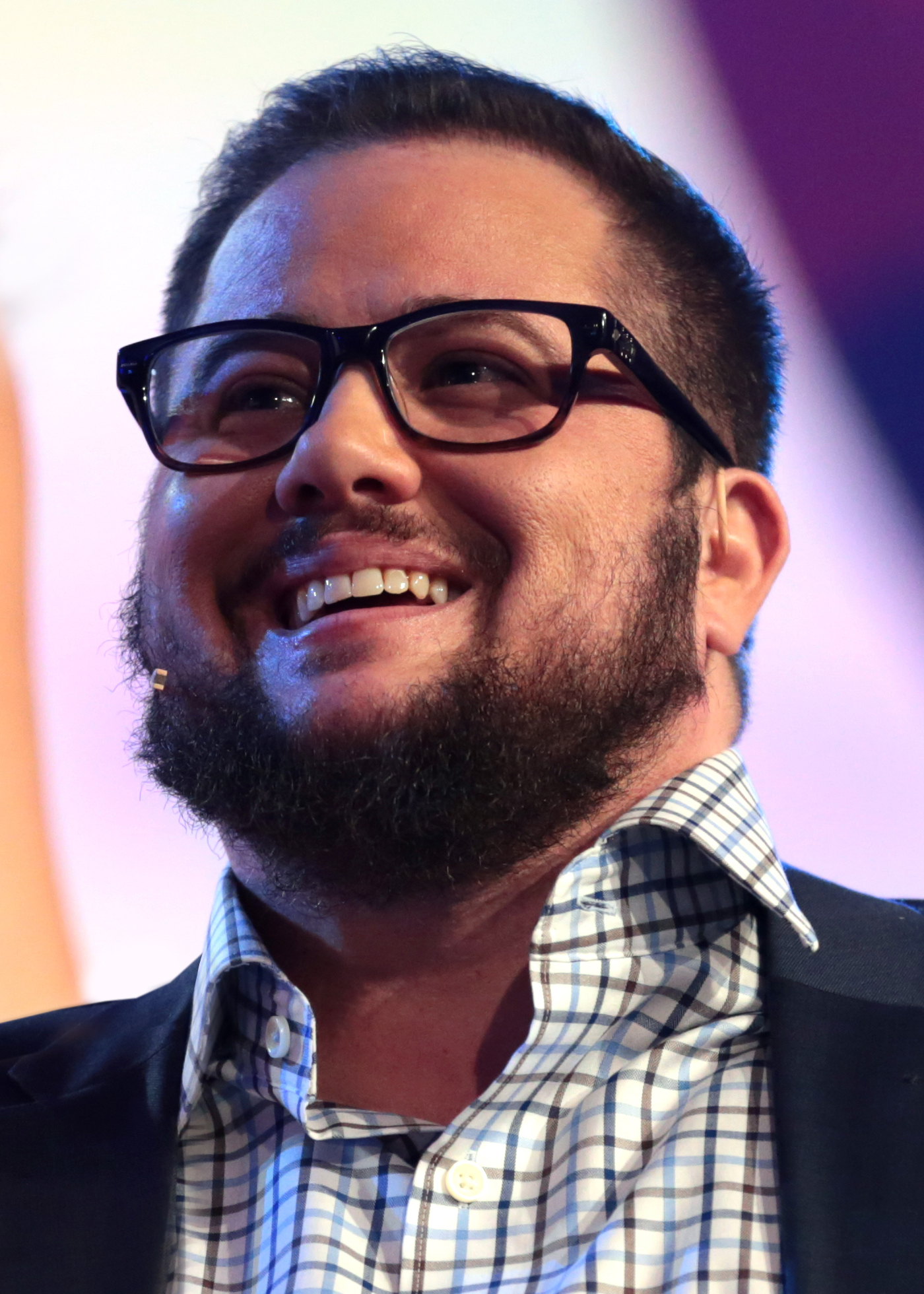
Paula Abdul (left, pictured in 2023) and Chaz Bono (right, pictured in 2017) are guest judges, along with Georgia Holt.

The episode originally aired on April 14, 2014.

=== Fashion ===
For the main stage, RuPaul wears a purple dress and a blonde wig. For the fashion show, Darienne Lake has an elephant-inspired grey dress with tusks for earrings. Adore Delano has a black panther-inspired outfit with an animal print, a long red wig, and a mask. BenDeLaCreme has an insect-inspired black, blue, and green outfit. Bianca Del Rio's outfit has a cheetah print, which she had also painted on her face. She wears a dark wig. Joslyn Fox has a short black-and-white dress with red shoes, a red wig, and a black headpiece. Trinity K. Bonet has as phoenix-inspired black-and-red outfit with feathers. Courtney Act wears a light blue outfit with large wings and a short blonde wig.

== Reception ==
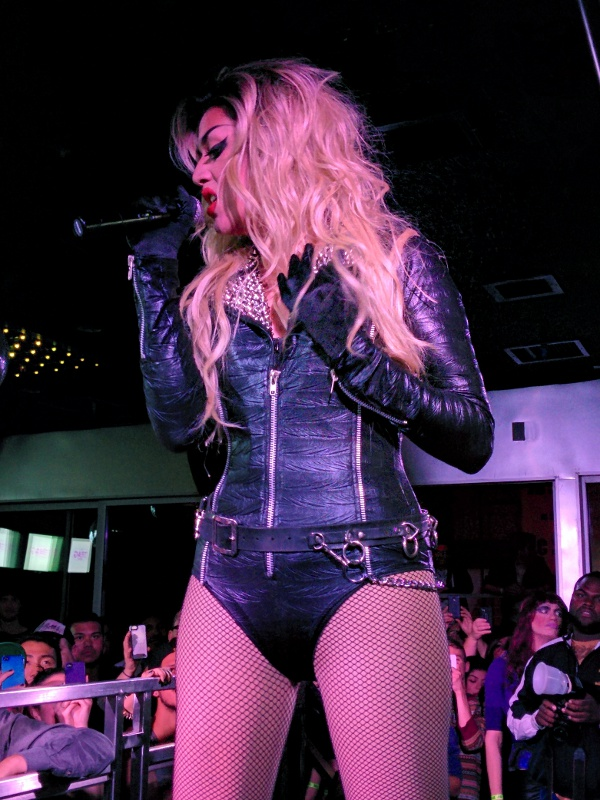
Adore Delano (pictured in 2014) wins the episode's lip-sync contest.

Oliver Sava of The A.V. Club gave the episode a rating of 'B+'. Stephen Daw included Abdul's participation in Billboard's 2018 list of the show's 50 best musical moments, writing: "As if having Chaz Bono and Georgia Holt weren't enough for one episode, RuPaul also managed to book Paula Abdul as an esteemed guest judge. The ... singer was clearly into the show, and even got to witness a legendary lipsync between Adore Delano and Trinity K. Bonet to her hit single." Daw selected the "Vibeology" performance for the magazine's 2024 list of the best lip-syncs from each of the show's main seasons, opining: "Had RuPaul not already saved BenDeLaCreme and Darienne Lake with their double shantay lip sync in episode 7, she would have saved both Trinity and Adore here."

Gregory Rosebrugh of IndieWire said Trinity K. Bonet's performance during "Vibeology" was "salacious". Lyndsey Parker of Rolling Stone called Adore Delano's performance "beyond-sickening". Kevin O'Keeffe ranked the "Vibeology" performance number 16 in INTO Magazine's 2018 "definitive ranking" of the show's lip-syncs. In 2019, Sam Brooks ranked the performance number 16 in The Spinoff's "definitive ranking" of the show's 162 lip-syncs, and David Levesley of the British version of GQ said Adore Delano and Trinity K. Bonet turned the song "into something electric and punchy". In 2020, Ryan Shea of Instinct said Trinity K. Bonet's performance "showed what an entertainer she really is". Ariana Bascom selected "Vibeology" for Screen Rant's 2022 list of the best lip-syncs from each season of the show, writing, "when the lights dimmed and [the song] started to play, Adore stepped up and proved that she was a lip sync assassin in her own right. Both queens delivered a fun and sensual lip sync, even playing off one another throughout the song. Trinity sashayed away and fans have been eagerly awaiting her All Stars return ever since."
