= RuPaul's Drag Race season 6 =

2014 season of RuPaul's Drag Race

RuPaul's Drag Race
- Season 6
- Promotional poster for season six
- Hosted by: RuPaul
- Judges: RuPaul; Michelle Visage; Santino Rice
- No. of contestants: 14
- Winner: Bianca Del Rio
- Runners-up: Adore Delano; Courtney Act
- Miss Congeniality: BenDeLaCreme
- Companion show: RuPaul's Drag Race: Untucked!
- No. of episodes: 14

Release
- Original network: Logo TV
- Original release: February 24 – May 19, 2014

Season chronology
- ← Previous; Season 5 Next → Season 7

The sixth season of RuPaul's Drag Race began airing February 24, 2014. Like the fifth season, the season featured 14 contestants competing for the title of "America's Next Drag Superstar". For the first time in the show's history, the season premiere was split into two episodes; the fourteen queens were split into two groups and the seven queens in each group competed against each other before being united as one group for the third episode.

Santino Rice and Michelle Visage returned as judges. Two new pit crew members, Miles Moody and Simon Sherry-Wood, joined Jason Carter and Shawn Morales. The winner of this season won a prize package that included a supply from Colorevolution Cosmetics and a cash prize of $100,000. This was also the first season where Absolut Vodka and Interior Illusions, Inc. were not sponsors for the show, more specifically for the Untucked episodes. The Interior Illusions Lounge was renamed to the Silver Lounge or FormDecor Lounge. The theme song played during the runway segment every episode was "Sissy That Walk" while the song playing during the credits is "Dance With U", both from the album Born Naked.

The winner of the sixth season of RuPaul's Drag Race was Bianca Del Rio, with Adore Delano and Courtney Act being the runners-up, and BenDeLaCreme being crowned season 6's Miss Congeniality.

== Contestants ==
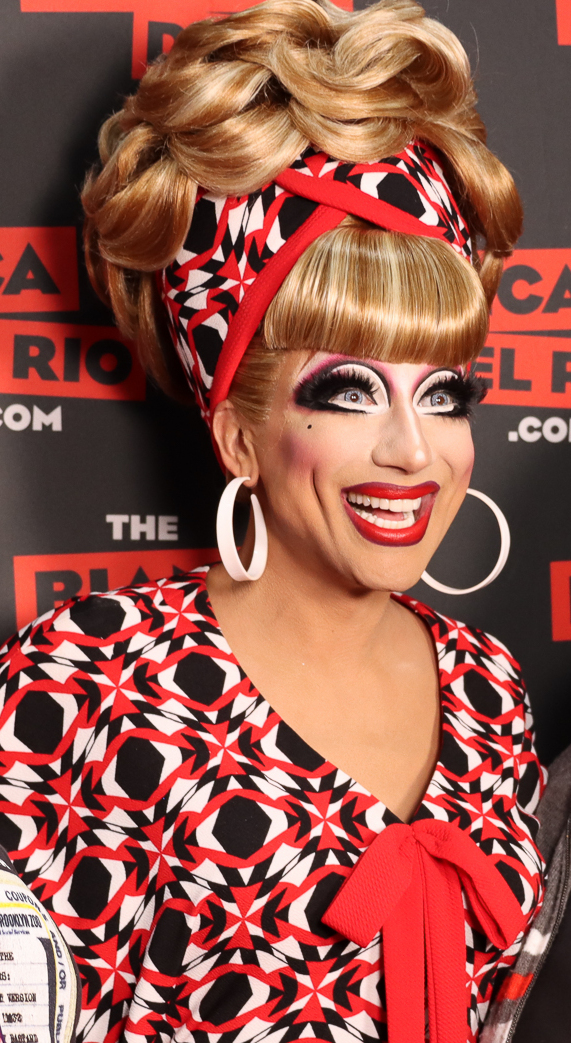
The winner, Bianca Del Rio

Ages, names, and cities stated are at time of filming.

Contestants of RuPaul's Drag Race season 6 and their backgrounds
Contestant	Age	Hometown	Outcome
Bianca Del Rio	37	New York City, New York	Winner
Adore Delano	23	Azusa, California	Runners-up
Courtney Act	31	West Hollywood, California	Runners-up
Darienne Lake (Note: Miss Darienne Lake is referred to as Darienne Lake on the show.)	41	Rochester, New York	4th place
BenDeLaCreme	31	Seattle, Washington	5th place (Note: BenDeLaCreme was voted Miss Congeniality by the viewers.)
Joslyn Fox	26	Worcester, Massachusetts	6th place
Trinity K. Bonet (Note: Trinity Kardashian Bonet is referred to as Trinity K. Bonet on the show.)	22	Atlanta, Georgia	7th place
Laganja Estranja	24	Los Angeles, California	8th place
Milk	25	New York City, New York	9th place
Gia Gunn	23	Chicago, Illinois	10th place
April Carrión	24	Guaynabo, Puerto Rico	11th place
Vivacious	40	New York City, New York	12th place
Kelly Mantle	37	Los Angeles, California	13th place (Note: Kelly Mantle and Magnolia Crawford competed respectively on the first and second episodes but, being eliminated in the two premieres, neither was in a higher place than the other.)
Magnolia Crawford	28	Seattle, Washington	13th place

== Contestant progress ==
Legend:

Bianca Del Rio won RuPaul's Drag Race season 6.
Adore Delano and Courtney Act were the runners-up.
BenDeLaCreme was voted Miss Congeniality (Miss C) by the viewers.
WIN indicates that the contestant won the challenge.
SAFE indicates that the contestant was declared safe by the judges.
BTM (Bottom) indicates that the contestant was up for elimination.
ELIM (Eliminated) indicates that the contestant was eliminated.
Guest indicates that the contestant returned as a guest.

Contestants progress with placements in each episode
Contestant	Episode												
Contestant	1	2	3	4	5	6	7	8	9	10	11	12	14
Bianca Del Rio		WIN	SAFE	SAFE	SAFE	SAFE	SAFE	WIN	SAFE	WIN	SAFE	SAFE	Winner
Adore Delano	SAFE		SAFE	SAFE	SAFE	WIN	WIN	SAFE	BTM	BTM	WIN	SAFE	Runner-up
Courtney Act		SAFE	SAFE	WIN	SAFE	SAFE	SAFE	SAFE	WIN	SAFE	SAFE	SAFE	Runner-up
Darienne Lake		BTM	WIN	SAFE	SAFE	SAFE	BTM	SAFE	SAFE	SAFE	BTM	ELIM	Guest
BenDeLaCreme	WIN		SAFE	SAFE	WIN	SAFE	BTM	SAFE	SAFE	SAFE	ELIM		Miss C
Joslyn Fox		SAFE	SAFE	SAFE	SAFE	SAFE	SAFE	BTM	SAFE	ELIM			Guest
Trinity K. Bonet		SAFE	SAFE	BTM	SAFE	BTM	SAFE	SAFE	ELIM				Guest
Laganja Estranja	SAFE		SAFE	SAFE	BTM	SAFE	WIN	ELIM					Guest
Milk		SAFE	SAFE	SAFE	SAFE	ELIM							Guest
Gia Gunn	SAFE		SAFE	SAFE	ELIM								Guest
April Carrión	SAFE		BTM	ELIM									Guest
Vivacious	BTM		ELIM										Guest
Magnolia Crawford		ELIM											Guest
Kelly Mantle	ELIM												Guest

== Lip syncs ==
Legend:

The contestant was eliminated after their first time in the bottom.
The contestant was eliminated after their second time in the bottom.
The contestant was eliminated after their third time in the bottom.
The contestant was eliminated after the lip sync to qualify for the finale.

Episode	Contestants			Song	Eliminated
1	Kelly Mantle	vs.	Vivacious	"Express Yourself" (Madonna)	Kelly Mantle
2	Darienne Lake	vs.	Magnolia Crawford	"Turn the Beat Around" (Vicki Sue Robinson)	Magnolia Crawford
3	April Carrión	vs.	Vivacious	"Shake It Up" (Selena Gomez)	Vivacious
4	April Carrión	vs.	Trinity K. Bonet	"I'm Every Woman" (Chaka Khan)	April Carrión
5	Gia Gunn	vs.	Laganja Estranja	"Head to Toe" (Lisa Lisa and Cult Jam)	Gia Gunn
6	Milk	vs.	Trinity K. Bonet	"Whatta Man" (Salt-n-Pepa, En Vogue)	Milk
7	BenDeLaCreme	vs.	Darienne Lake	"Point of No Return" (Exposé)	None
8	Joslyn Fox	vs.	Laganja Estranja	"Stupid Girls" (Pink)	Laganja Estranja
9	Adore Delano	vs.	Trinity K. Bonet	"Vibeology" (Paula Abdul)	Trinity K. Bonet
10	Adore Delano	vs.	Joslyn Fox	"Think" (Aretha Franklin)	Joslyn Fox
11	BenDeLaCreme	vs.	Darienne Lake	"Stronger (What Doesn't Kill You)" (Kelly Clarkson)	BenDeLaCreme
12	Adore Delano vs. Bianca Del Rio vs. Courtney Act vs. Darienne Lake			"Sissy That Walk" (RuPaul)	Darienne Lake

== Guest judges ==
Listed in chronological order:

- Adam Lambert, singer and actor
- Mike Ruiz, photographer
- Khloé Kardashian, television personality
- Lena Headey, actress
- Linda Blair, actress
- Lucian Piane, music producer and composer
- Sheryl Lee Ralph, actress, singer, and activist
- Gillian Jacobs, actress
- Heather McDonald, actress and comedian
- Eve, rapper and actress
- Trina, rapper
- Leah Remini, actress
- Lainie Kazan, actress and singer
- Bruce Vilanch, writer and actor
- Jaime Pressly, actress
- Chaz Bono, writer and activist
- Georgia Holt, actress and singer-songwriter
- Paula Abdul, singer, choreographer and television personality
- Neil Patrick Harris, actor
- David Burtka, actor and chef
- Bob Mackie, fashion designer

=== Special guests ===
Guests who appeared in episodes, but did not judge on the main stage.

Episode 4

- Our Lady J, screenwriter, producer and director

Episode 14

- Latrice Royale, Miss Congeniality of season 4 and contestant on All Stars season 1
- Alaska, contestant on season 5
- Jiggly Caliente, contestant on season 4
- Ivy Winters, Miss Congeniality of season 5
- Jinkx Monsoon, winner of season 5
- Judge Judy, court-show arbitrator, television producer, author, and former prosecutor and court judge (via video message)

== Episodes ==
No. overall	No. in season	Title	Original release date
66	1	"RuPaul's Big Opening"	February 24, 2014 (Note: A preview of the first episode was unveiled on February 17, showing all but the lipsync.)
Seven new queens enter the workroom. RuPaul then announces that this season will be a split premiere. For the first mini-challenge, the queens do a photoshoot while jumping off a platform. Laganja Estranja wins the mini-challenge. For the main challenge, the queens create an outfit inspired by a TV show.: Adore Delano - Here Comes Honey Boo Boo; April Carrión - Duck Dynasty; BenDeLaCreme - The Golden Girls; Gia Gunn - Keeping Up with the Kardashians; Kelly Mantle - Downton Abbey; Laganja Estranja - Dancing with the Stars; Vivacious - Game of Thrones; On the runway, April Carrión, BenDeLaCreme and Gia Gunn receive positive critiques, with BenDeLaCreme winning the challenge. Adore Delano, Kelly Mantle and Vivacious receive negative critiques, with Adore Delano being safe. Kelly Mantle and Vivacious lip-sync to "Express Yourself" by Madonna. Vivacious wins the lip-sync and Kelly Mantle is the first queen to sashay away.: Guest Judges: Adam Lambert and Mike Ruiz; Mini-Challenge: Photoshoot while jumping off a platform; Mini-Challenge Winner: Laganja Estranja; Main Challenge: Create an outfit inspired by a TV show; Challenge Winner: BenDeLaCreme; Challenge Prize: A custom jewel package by Fierce Drag Jewels; Bottom Two: Kelly Mantle and Vivacious; Lip-Sync Song: "Express Yourself" by Madonna; Eliminated: Kelly Mantle; Farewell Message: "Love u girlz! Rock your Pussies! XOXO Kelly Mantle P.S. Eat my Bacon!"
67	2	"RuPaul's Big Opening: Part 2"	March 3, 2014
The remaining seven queens enter the workroom. For this week's mini-challenge, the queens do a boudoir pillow fight with the pit crew photoshoot. Trinity K. Bonet wins the mini-challenge. For the main challenge, the queens create an outfit inspired by party supplies.: Bianca Del Rio - Luau Party; Courtney Act - Republican Party; Darienne Lake - St. Patrick's Day Party; Joslyn Fox - Quinceañera; Magnolia Crawford - Hoedown; Milk - Toga Party; Trinity K. Bonet - Princess Party; On the runway, Bianca Del Rio, Milk and Trinity K. Bonet receive positive critiques, with Bianca Del Rio winning the challenge. Darienne Lake, Joslyn Fox and Magnolia Crawford receive negative critiques, with Joslyn Fox being safe. Darienne Lake and Magnolia Crawford lip-sync to "Turn the Beat Around" by Vicki Sue Robinson. Darienne Lake wins the lip-sync and Magnolia Crawford sashays away.: Guest Judge: Khloe Kardashian; Mini-Challenge: Boudoir pillow fight with the pit crew photoshoot; Mini-Challenge Winner: Trinity K. Bonet; Main Challenge: Create an outfit inspired by party supplies; Challenge Winner: Bianca Del Rio; Challenge Prize: A $2,500 shopping spree from Fabric Planet; Bottom Two: Darienne Lake and Magnolia Crawford; Lip-Sync Song: "Turn the Beat Around" by Vicki Sue Robinson; Eliminated: Magnolia Crawford; Farewell Message: "ZOMG! Love you girlie girls! xoxo - Magnolia"
68	3	"Scream Queens"	March 10, 2014
The remaining twelve queens meet for the first time. For this week's mini-challenge, the queens pair up and create a beach themed lip-sync. Adore Delano and Milk win the mini-challenge. For this week's main challenge, the queens team up and star in horror film trailers for "Drag Race Me to Hell".: Team Adore Delano: Adore Delano, April Carrión, BenDeLaCreme, Gia Gunn, Laganja Estranja and Vivacious; Team Milk: Bianca Del Rio, Courtney Act, Darienne Lake, Joslyn Fox, Milk and Trinity K. Bonet; On the runway, category is Best Drag. Team Milk is the winning team, with Darienne Lake winning the challenge. Team Adore Delano is the losing team. Adore Delano, April Carrión and Vivacious receive negative critiques, with Adore Delano being safe. April Carrión and Vivacious lip-sync to "Shake It Up" by Selena Gomez. April Carrión wins the lip-sync and Vivacious sashays away.: Guest Judges: Lena Headey and Linda Blair; Mini-Challenge: Create a beach themed lip-sync in pairs; Mini-Challenge Winners: Adore Delano and Milk; Main Challenge: In teams, star in horror film trailers for "Drag Race Me to Hell"; Runway Theme: Best Drag; Challenge Winner: Darienne Lake; Challenge Prize: A 5-night stay at Island House Key West Resort; Bottom Two: April Carrión and Vivacious; Lip-Sync Song: "Shake It Up" by Selena Gomez; Eliminated: Vivacious; Farewell Message: "Girls you will be missed. Take the world by storm, educate the masses. Get it, rearrange it, internalize it. Turn it. - Vivacious"
69	4	"Shade: The Rusical"	March 17, 2014
For this week's mini-challenge, the queens have to guess a mashed up photo of someone and decide if it's a celebrity, or a drag queen. Adore Delano and BenDeLaCreme win the mini-challenge. For the main challenge, the queens perform in Shade: The Rusical. Team Adore Delano: Adore Delano plays Bad Penny; April Carrión plays Bertha; Joslyn Fox plays Amanda; Laganja Estranja plays Showgirl; Milk plays Les Mizabella; Team BenDeLaCreme: BenDeLaCreme plays Shady Lady; Bianca Del Rio and Trinity K. Bonet play Pageant Queens; Courtney Act plays Good Penny; Darienne Lake and Gia Gunn play Comedy Queens; On the runway, category is Tony Award Realness. Adore Delano, BenDeLaCreme and Courtney Act receive positive critiques, with Courtney Act winning the challenge. April Carrión, Darienne Lake and Trinity K. Bonet receive negative critiques, with Darienne Lake being safe. April Carrión and Trinity K. Bonet lip-sync to "I'm Every Woman" by Chaka Khan. Trinity K. Bonet wins the lip-sync and April Carrión sashays away.: Guest Judges: Lucian Piane and Sheryl Lee Ralph; Mini-Challenge: Female or She-male? (Note: This challenge was removed after the episode originally aired due to the usage of terms offensive to the trans community.); Mini-Challenge Winner: Adore Delano and BenDeLaCreme; Main Challenge: Shade: The Rusical; Runway Theme: Tony Award Realness; Challenge Winner: Courtney Act; Challenge Prize: 2 VIP packages to the Broadway musical Kinky Boots; Bottom Two: April Carrión and Trinity K. Bonet; Lip-Sync Song: "I'm Every Woman" by Chaka Khan; Eliminated: April Carrión; Farewell Message: "Love you girls, Echa' pa' lante, See you soon ❤️ April"
70	5	"Snatch Game"	March 24, 2014
For this week's main challenge, the queens play the Snatch Game. Gillian Jacobs and Heather McDonald star as the celebrity contestants. The cast consisted of: Adore Delano as Anna Nicole Smith; BenDeLaCreme as Maggie Smith; Bianca Del Rio as Judge Judy; Courtney Act as Fran Drescher; Darienne Lake as Paula Deen; Gia Gunn as Kim Kardashian; Joslyn Fox as Teresa Giudice; Laganja Estranja as Rachel Zoe; Milk as Julia Child; Trinity K. Bonet as Nicki Minaj; On the runway, category is Night of a Thousand RuPaul's. Adore Delano, BenDeLaCreme and Bianca Del Rio receive positive critiques, with BenDeLaCreme winning the challenge. Gia Gunn, Milk and Laganja Estranja receive negative critiques, with Milk being safe. Gia Gunn and Laganja Estranja lip-sync to "Head to Toe" by Lisa Lisa & Cult Jam. Laganja Estranja wins the lip-sync and Gia Gunn sashays away.: Guest Judges: Gillian Jacobs and Heather McDonald; Main Challenge: Snatch Game; Runway Theme: Night of a Thousand RuPaul's; Challenge Winner: BenDeLaCreme; Challenge Prize: 2 couture outfits from Syren Latex; Bottom Two: Gia Gunn and Laganja Estranja; Lip-Sync Song: "Head to Toe" by Lisa Lisa & Cult Jam; Eliminated: Gia Gunn; Farewell Message: "Bring out the big Gunns dudes. xoxo Gia Gunn"
71	6	"Oh No She Betta Don't!"	March 31, 2014
For this week's mini-challenge, the queens read each other to filth. Darienne Lake wins the mini-challenge. For the main challenge, the queens write, record, and perform verses to "Oh No She Betta Don't".: Team Panty Ho's: Adore Delano, Bianca Del Rio, Courtney Act, Darienne Lake and Laganja Estranja; Team Ru-Tang Clan: BenDeLaCreme, Joslyn Fox, Milk and Trinity K. Bonet; On the runway, category is Crazy, Sexy, Cool. Adore Delano, Bianca Del Rio and Joslyn Fox receive positive critiques, with Adore Delano winning the challenge. Darienne Lake, Milk and Trinity K. Bonet receive negative critiques, with Darienne Lake being safe. Milk and Trinity K. Bonet lip-sync to "Whatta Man" by Salt-n-Pepa with En Vogue. Trinity K. Bonet wins the lip-sync and Milk sashays away.: Guest Judges: Eve and Trina; Mini-Challenge: Reading is Fundamental; Mini-Challenge Winner: Darienne Lake; Main Challenge: Write, record, and perform verses to "Oh No She Betta Don't"; Challenge Winner: Adore Delano; Runway Theme: Crazy, Sexy, Cool; Challenge Prize: A collection of custom-made jewelry; Bottom Two: Milk and Trinity K. Bonet; Lip-Sync Song: "Whatta Man" by Salt-n-Pepa with En Vogue; Eliminated: Milk; Farewell Message: "It's Milkin' time! ❤️ you girls! Big + scary forever (drawing of cow udders)"
72	7	"Glamazon by Colorevolution"	April 7, 2014
For this week's mini-challenge, the queens design nails and hand model different fruits and vegetables. Laganja Estranja wins the mini-challenge. For the main challenge, the queens pair up and film an infomercial for RuPaul's Glamazon Cosmetics.: Adore Delano and Laganja Estranja; BenDeLaCreme and Darienne Lake; Bianca Del Rio and Trinity K. Bonet; Courtney Act and Joslyn Fox; On the runway, category is Black and White Drama. Adore Delano, Bianca Del Rio, Laganja Estranja and Trinity K. Bonet receive positive critiques, with Adore Delano and Laganja Estranja both winning the challenge. BenDeLaCreme, Courtney Act, Darienne Lake and Joslyn Fox receive negative critiques, with Courtney Act and Joslyn Fox being safe. BenDeLaCreme and Darienne Lake lip-sync to "Point of No Return" by Exposé. Darienne Lake is declared the winner of the lip-sync, but Ben is saved and no one goes home.: Guest Judges: Leah Remini and Lainie Kazan; Mini-Challenge: Design nails and hand model different fruits and vegetables; Mini-Challenge Winner: Laganja Estranja; Main Challenge: In pairs, film an infomercial for RuPaul's Glamazon Cosmetics; Runway Theme: Black and White Drama; Challenge Winners: Adore Delano and Laganja Estranja; Challenge Prize: A collection of skincare products from Lather; Bottom Two: BenDeLaCreme and Darienne Lake; Lip-Sync Song: "Point of No Return" by Exposé; Eliminated: None
73	8	"Drag Queens of Comedy"	April 7, 2014
For this week's mini-challenge, the queens lip-sync to a RuPaul song upside down. Joslyn Fox wins the mini-challenge. For the main challenge, the queens perform a stand-up comedy act in front of the judges and a live audience. On the runway, Bianca Del Rio, Darienne Lake and Trinity K. Bonet receive positive critiques, with Bianca Del Rio winning the challenge. BenDeLaCreme, Joslyn Fox and Laganja Estranja receive negative critiques, with BenDeLaCreme being safe. Joslyn Fox and Laganja Estranja lip-sync to "Stupid Girls" by Pink. Joslyn Fox wins the lip-sync and Laganja Estranja sashays away.: Guest Judges: Bruce Vilanch and Jaime Pressly; Mini-Challenge: Lip-sync to a RuPaul song upside down; Mini-Challenge Winner: Joslyn Fox; Main Challenge: Perform a stand-up comedy act in front of the judges and a live audience; Challenge Winner: Bianca Del Rio; Challenge Prize: A one-of-a-kind gown designed by Marco Marco; Bottom Two: Joslyn Fox and Laganja Estranja; Lip-Sync Song: "Stupid Girls" by Pink; Eliminated: Laganja Estranja; Farewell Message: "xoxo, Ganja"
74	9	"Queens of Talk"	April 14, 2014
For this week's mini-challenge, the queens play "Hung Men", a hangman inspired challenge. BenDeLaCreme wins the mini-challenge. For the main challenge, the queens guest host The RuPaul Show and interview Chaz Bono and Georgia Holt. On the runway, category is Animal Kingdom Couture. BenDeLaCreme and Courtney Act receive positive critiques, with Courtney Act winning the challenge. Adore Delano, Joslyn Fox and Trinity K. Bonet receive negative critiques, with Joslyn Fox being safe. Adore Delano and Trinity K. Bonet lip-sync to "Vibeology" by Paula Abdul. Adore Delano wins the lip-sync and Trinity K. Bonet sashays away.: Guest Judges: Chaz Bono, Georgia Holt, and Paula Abdul; Mini-Challenge: "Hung Men", a hangman inspired challenge; Mini-Challenge Winner: BenDeLaCreme; Main Challenge: Guest host The RuPaul Show and interview Chaz Bono and Georgia Holt; Runway Theme: Animal Kingdom Couture; Challenge Winner: Courtney Act; Challenge Prize: A wig wardrobe from Outfiters Wig and a one-year haircare supply from Aquage; Bottom Two: Adore Delano and Trinity K. Bonet; Lip-Sync Song: "Vibeology" by Paula Abdul; Eliminated: Trinity K. Bonet; Farewell Message: "Be cool, Be nice, Be you. xoxo TKB"
75	10	"Drag My Wedding"	April 21, 2014
For this week's mini-challenge, the queens do abstract paintings using their bodies in honor of same-sex marriage . Bianca Del Rio wins the mini-challenge. For the main challenge, the queens makeover grooms into brides for a drag wedding with their spouses. On the runway, BenDeLaCreme and Bianca Del Rio receive positive critiques, with Bianca Del Rio winning the challenge. Adore Delano, Darienne Lake and Joslyn Fox receive negative critiques, with Darienne Lake being safe. Adore Delano and Joslyn Fox lip-sync to "Think" by Aretha Franklin. Adore Delano wins the lip-sync and Joslyn Fox sashays away.: Guest Judges: Neil Patrick Harris and David Burtka; Mini-Challenge: Do abstract paintings using their bodies in honor of same-sex marriage; Mini-Challenge Winner: Bianca Del Rio; Main Challenge: Makeover grooms into brides for a drag wedding with their spouses; Challenge Winner: Bianca Del Rio; Challenge Prize: A trip for two to Hawaii; Bottom Two: Adore Delano and Joslyn Fox; Lip-Sync Song: "Think" by Aretha Franklin; Eliminated: Joslyn Fox; Farewell Message: "Forever Sisters: Keep It Foxy! Love Your Guts! Joslyn ❤️"
76	11	"Glitter Ball"	April 28, 2014
For this week's mini-challenge, the queens have a bitchfest with puppets. BenDeLaCreme wins the mini-challenge. For the main challenge, the queens create three looks for the Glitter Ball: Banjee Girl Bling, Platinum Card Executive Realness and Dripping in Jewels Eleganza.: Adore Delano - Diamond; BenDeLaCreme - Rose Quartz; Bianca Del Rio - Sapphire; Courtney Act - Ruby; Darienne Lake - Topaz; On the runway, Adore Delano and Bianca Del Rio receive positive critiques, with Adore Delano winning the challenge. BenDeLaCreme, Courtney Act and Darienne Lake receive negative critiques, with Courtney Act being safe. BenDeLaCreme and Darienne Lake lip-sync to "Stronger (What Doesn't Kill You)" by Kelly Clarkson. Darienne Lake wins the lip-sync and BenDeLaCreme sashays away.: Guest Judges: Bob Mackie and Khloe Kardashian; Mini-Challenge: Everybody Loves Puppets; Mini-Challenge Winner: BenDeLaCreme; Main Challenge: The Glitter Ball; Runway Themes: Banjee Girl Bling, Platinum Card Executive Realness, and Dripping in Jewels Eleganza; Challenge Winner: Adore Delano; Main Challenge Prize: A costume from Kicka Custom Design; Bottom Two: BenDeLaCreme and Darienne Lake; Lip-Sync Song: "Stronger (What Doesn't Kill You)" by Kelly Clarkson; Eliminated: BenDeLaCreme; Farewell message: "Dear top 4- howz it going? I'm doing pretty good. Sometimes you have to have Mama Ru yell atcha a bunch of times before it sinks in. I guess I never reached that number of times, Darian. I knew the second I was up against you i waz out the door. You get it lady. I wish you all the luck in the world and only harbor enough resentment to write a long pointless message that you will have to clean and clean and clean and clean. But fo real tho you girlz are my heroes. XX BDLC"
77	12	"Sissy That Walk"	May 5, 2014
For the final challenge of the season, the queens star in RuPaul's music video "Sissy That Walk" and act in two different acting scenes. On the runway, category is Best Drag. RuPaul then tells the queens that they will all be lip-syncing, and one queen will be eliminated and not move on to the finale. The four remaining queens then lip-sync to "Sissy That Walk" by RuPaul. Darienne Lake is then eliminated, with Adore Delano, Bianca Del Rio and Courtney Act being the finalists of the season.: Special Guests: Mathu Andersen and Jamal Sims; Main Challenge: Star in RuPaul's music video "Sissy That Walk" and act in two different acting scenes; Runway Theme: Best Drag; Lip-Sync Song: "Sissy That Walk" by RuPaul; Eliminated: Darienne Lake
78	13	"Countdown to the Crown"	May 12, 2014
This week's episode takes a look back on the highlights, low-lights, and previously unseen footage from the season using various countdowns. In addition, past contestants Alaska, Jinkx Monsoon, Jujubee, Latrice Royale, Manila Luzon, Raja, Raven, Shangela Laquifa Wadley, Sharon Needles (impersonating Michelle Visage), and Tammie Brown also appeared, giving their opinions on the season and the contestants.
79	14	"Reunited!"	May 19, 2014
All the queens return for the live grand finale. It is announced that BenDeLaCreme is this season's Miss Congeniality. It is then announced that Bianca Del Rio is the winner, leaving Adore Delano and Courtney Act as the runners-up.: Miss Congeniality: BenDeLaCreme; Runners-up: Adore Delano and Courtney Act; Winner of RuPaul's Drag Race Season Six: Bianca Del Rio

== Controversy ==
Use of the term "Shemale" in the "Female or She-male?" challenge of episode 4 led to complaints over transphobic slang specifically from the season contestants Gia Gunn and Courtney Act, as well as previous contestants Carmen Carrera, Willam Belli, and Kylie Sonique Love. Logo temporarily removed the episode from all platforms and stopped using "You've got she-mail" as the video message intro. Episode 4 was eventually put back up on streaming services with the "Female or She-male?" mini-challenge segment removed. From Season 7 onwards, the catchphrase "She done already done had herses!" was used as the new video message intro.

== Soundtrack ==
In this season the theme song for the series remains unchanged from the original season, only being condensed to a shorter length to allow for more show time. As in previous seasons, while RuPaul enters walking the runway before the judging each episode his song "Cover Girl" plays; an instrumental version of the song continues to play while he introduces the judges and celebrity guests. The main musical change-up of the season comes during the runway while each contestant struts, modeling their looks. As in each previous season, the song changes to promote more album and/or single sales for RuPaul. The song this season played during the segment is "Sissy That Walk", from RuPaul's album Born Naked. Also from the album "Dance with U" plays at the end of each episode while the remaining queens dance on the runway, exiting the stage.

Born Naked essentially serves as a soundtrack for the season. Its release coincided with the season premiere, primarily for promotional reasons. However, in the time just after Logo's release of the season 6 "Meet the Queens" interviews, which announced and introduced the season's cast, an album entitled The CoverGurlz was released digitally presented by RuPaul, meant to promote the upcoming season. The single "Oh No She Better Don't" was also released during the season.

=== RuPaul Presents: The CoverGurlz ===
RuPaul Presents: The CoverGurlz

Compilation album by RuPaul
- Released: January 28, 2014
- Recorded: 2013
- Genre: Dance
- Length: 49:27
- Label: World of Wonder

RuPaul chronology
Glamazon (2011)	RuPaul Presents: The CoverGurlz (2014)	Born Naked (2014)

RuPaul Presents: The CoverGurlz is a 2014 compilation album by entertainer RuPaul, featuring the season 6 cast of his show RuPaul's Drag Race. The album was released on January 28, 2014. The album was only released digitally to iTunes and Amazon.

==== Background ====
Although previous winners and top-three contestants have been given the chance to collaborate with RuPaul either on a song^{[a]} or by performing in one of the artist's music videos, respectively, this album marks the first time in RuPaul's Drag Race history that an album has been produced which features every contestant from the season.

The compilation consists of 14 covers of songs previously released by RuPaul, performed by all of the RuPaul's Drag Race season 6 contestants. It features tracks originally from RuPaul's albums Champion and Glamazon, as well as his extended play SuperGlam DQ, and the 2013 non-album single "Lick It Lollipop". The album also features an outtake from Champion entitled "Let's Turn the Night", reproduced with new vocals by Jason Carter and Miles Davis Moody of the RuPaul's Drag Race pit crew. April Carrión's cover of "Sexy Drag Queen" also features Jipsta from the original version of the song.^{[b]}

As promotion for both the season's contestants and the, then, upcoming season, each contestant is also featured in a short music video for their cover ending with a montage of clips from their respective audition tapes. World of Wonder also produced a music video for the pit crew's song "Let's Turn the Night", which also promoted RuPaul's, then, recently released fragrance Glamazon, released as part of a limited edition make-up line with Colorevolution Cosmetics.

==== Release history ====
Before the compilation's release, RuPaul confirmed on Twitter that a new album, in which each of the Season 6 contestants covered a song from his catalog, would be coming out.

==== Reception ====
The week of release the compilation album debuted at number 6 on the iTunes Dance album chart.

==== Track listing ====
(All writing credits adapted from the liner notes of the albums the songs originally appeared.)

No.	Title	Writer(s)	Length
1.	"Let's Turn the Night" (featuring The Pit Crew)	RuPaul Charles*Lucian Piane	3:40
2.	"Ladyboy" (featuring Gia Gunn)	RuPaul Charles*Lucian Piane	2:33
3.	"Tranny Chaser" (featuring Joslyn Fox)	RuPaul Charles*Lucian Piane	3:56
4.	"I Bring the Beat" (featuring Vivacious)	RuPaul Charles*Lucian Piane	3:22
5.	"Superstar" (featuring Adore Delano)	RuPaul Charles*Lucian Piane	3:29
6.	"Click Clack (Make Dat Money)" (featuring Bianca Del Rio)	RuPaul Charles*Lucian Piane	3:09
7.	"Destiny Is Mine" (featuring Milk)	RuPaul Charles*Lucian Piane	2:58
8.	"Devil Made Me Do It" (featuring BenDeLaCreme)	RuPaul Charles*Lucian Piane	2:59
9.	"Lick It Lollipop" (featuring Darienne Lake)		3:13
10.	"Glamazon" (featuring Magnolia Crawford)	RuPaul Charles*Lucian Piane	4:02
11.	"Main Event" (featuring Kelly Mantle)	RuPaul Charles*Lucian Piane	2:52
12.	"Champion" (featuring Courtney Act)	RuPaul Charles*Lucian Piane	3:27
13.	"Jealous of My Boogie" (featuring Laganja Estranja)	RuPaul Charles*Lucian Piane	3:06
14.	"Cover Girl" (featuring Trinity K. Bonet)	RuPaul Charles*Lucian Piane	3:01
15.	"Sexy Drag Queen" (featuring April Carrión with Jipsta)	RuPaul Charles	3:40
Total length:			49:27
