= Milk (drag queen) =

American drag queen and figure skater

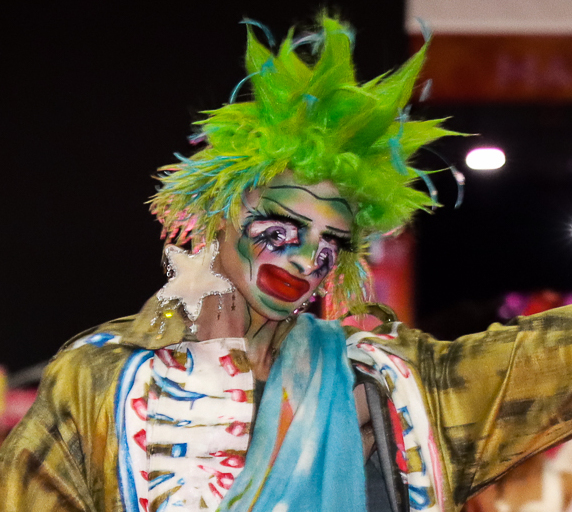
- Milk at RuPaul’s DragCon, 2024
- Born: Daniel P. Donigan; June 23, 1987 (age 39); Syracuse, New York, U.S.
- Occupations: Drag queen, model, Figure skater
- Television: RuPaul's Drag Race (season 6); RuPaul's Drag Race All Stars (season 3)
- Spouse: Veer Nanavatty (m. 2026)
- Website: bigandmilky.com

Milk (born June 23, 1987) is the stage name of Daniel P. Donigan, an American drag performer and former figure skater who came to attention on the sixth season of RuPaul's Drag Race, and the third season of RuPaul's Drag Race: All Stars.

== Early life ==
Donigan was raised in Syracuse, New York. He served as an altar boy at his Catholic church and attended Catholic school. He first came out as gay to his mom. He stated, "I always knew I was different. I liked figure skating when all the other boys didn't. I hated basketball when all the other boys liked it." He began ice skating at age 9. He said that he and his dad "never had a very close relationship."

Voice actor Tom Kenny is his cousin.

== Career ==
=== Drag ===
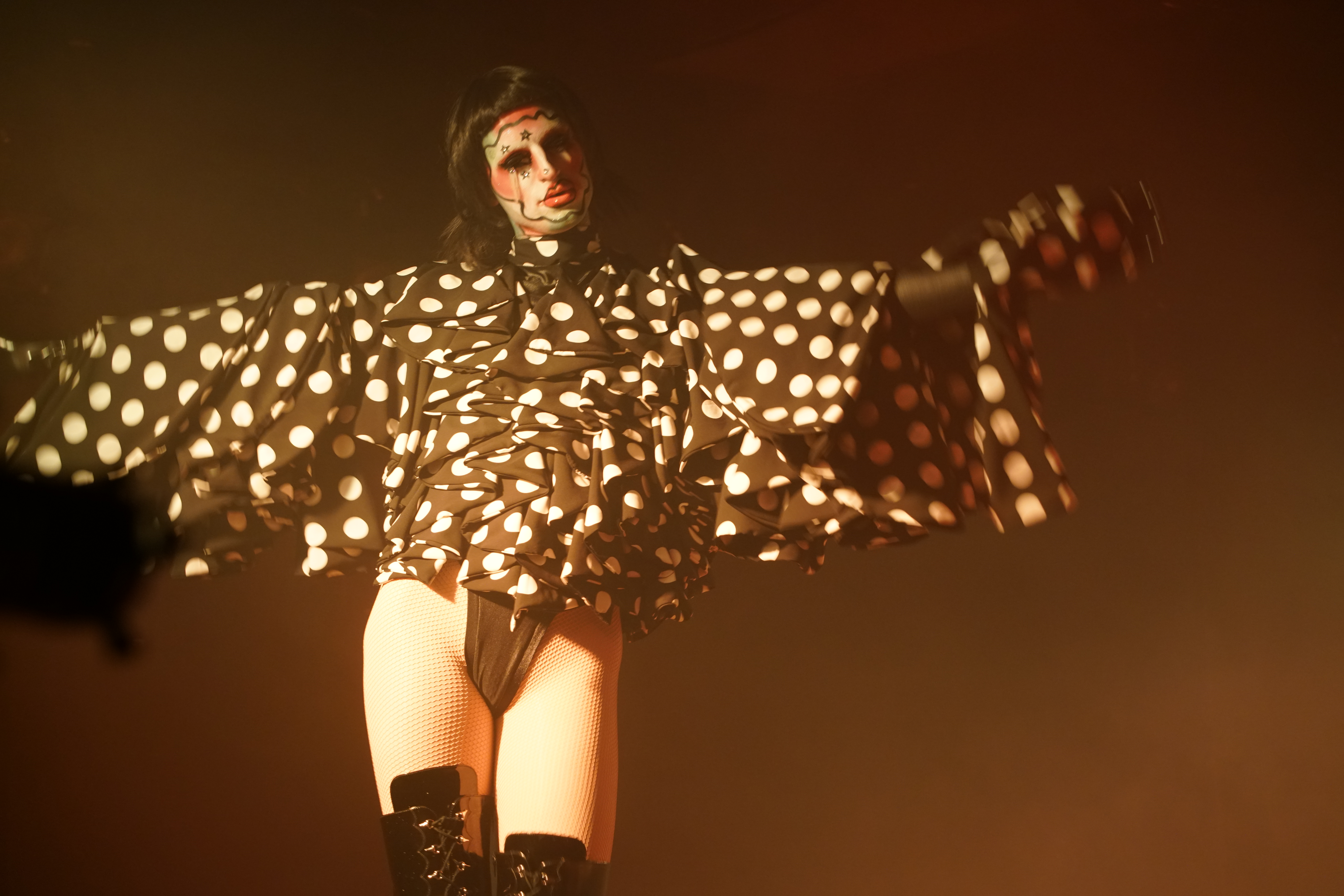
Milk at the White Rabbit Cabaret

After moving to New York City in 2012, Donigan began a full-time career as a drag performer. Donigan first gained attention when he appeared on season six of RuPaul's Drag Race in 2014. Out of 14 contestants, Milk placed ninth overall, losing a lip-sync to Trinity K. Bonet in the sixth episode. On October 20, 2017, Donigan was announced as one of the 10 contestants for RuPaul's Drag Race All Stars 3. He was eliminated by Kennedy Davenport in the third episode, placing 8th. He again placed ninth after Morgan McMichaels returned to the competition.

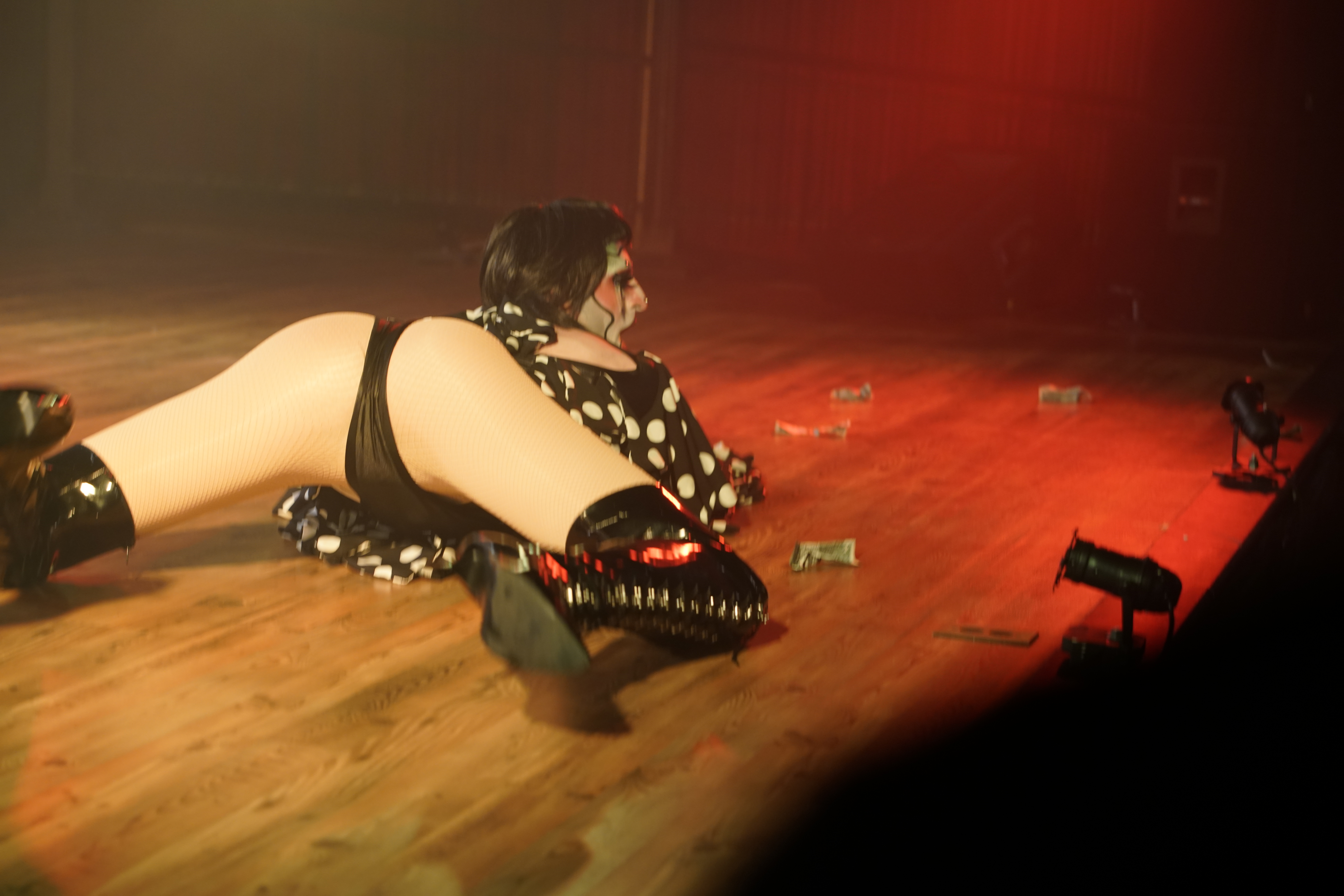
Milk at the White Rabbit Cabaret

Outside of Drag Race, Donigan has modeled for Marc Jacobs's Spring/Summer 2016 Campaign and Vivienne Westwood's S/S 2018 campaign. He was featured in Perry Ellis's Fall 2018 collection. In print work, he was featured on the cover of Hello Mr. magazine's third issue and featured in the third issue of Gayletter and in the January 2018 issue of Gay Times. He was featured in a 2014 issue of Next Magazine. He was announced as the new face of Madonna's skincare line, MDNA Skin. In 2017, Milk appeared as Madonna in a video promoting the skincare range, dressing in several of her iconic costumes.

=== Figure skating ===
Donigan is a former figure skater who qualified to the 2009 U.S. Figure Skating Championships in Junior Ice Dance. He retired from competitive skating in 2009. He returned to competition in 2025, winning first place in the Gold Solo Pattern Dance and Gold Solo Free Dance categories at the U.S. Eastern Adult Sectional Championships.

He performed at the Bryant Park Figure-Skating Rink for the Guys On Ice event as charity for the Ali Forney Center.

== Music ==
Donigan formed the group The Dairy Queens in 2016, whose first single, "Milk It", was released on July 2, 2016. He then released his first solo single, "Touch the Fashion, Change Your Life", which he performed live on the first episode of All Stars 3 in 2017.

== Personal life ==
Donigan is Catholic and gay. He was in an open relationship with James B. Whiteside, principal dancer with American Ballet Theatre, for 12 years. In October 2020, Donigan announced on Instagram that they have amicably split. In April 2026, Donigan married Veer Nanavatty. Donigan currently lives in New York City.

== Filmography ==
=== Television ===
Year	Title	Role	Notes
2014	RuPaul's Drag Race (season 6)	Herself	Contestant (9th place)
2016	Skin Wars	Herself	Episode: "Miss Skin Wars"
2018	RuPaul's Drag Race All Stars (season 3)	Herself	Contestant (9th place)
2019	Hey Qween!	Herself	Guest
2019	Watch What Happens Live with Andy Cohen	Herself	Guest

=== Music Videos ===
Year	Title	Artist	Ref.
2020	Fashion Blogger	Rhyme So	

=== Web ===
Year	Title	Role	Notes	Ref.
2014	James St. James: Transformations	Himself	Guest	
2014–2018	Milk's LegenDAIRY Looks	Himself	Host	
2014–2017	#MarcoMarcoShow Backstage	Himself	Model	
2014	Ring My Bell	Himself	Guest	
2015	Drag Queens React	Himself	Part 2	
2017	$TRANGER$ FOR CA$H	Himself	With Kim Chi	
2017	How to Makeup	Himself	Episode: "Milk's Finishing Touches"	
2017	Craiglist Missed Connections	Himself	Guest	
2018	Whatcha Packin'	Himself	Guest	
2018	M.U.G.	Himself	With Kim Chi	
2020	BBC Sport	Himself	Guest	
2022	Out of the Closet	Himself	Guest	
2023	Glam Slam	Himself	Contestant	

== Discography ==
Singles

Year	Song	Ref(s)
2016	"Milk It"	
2018	"Touch the Fashion"	

=== Featured singles ===
Title	Year	Album
"Sitting on a Secret" (RuPaul featuring Aja, Chi Chi DeVayne, Milk, Morgan McMichaels, & Thorgy Thor)	2018	Non-album single

== See also ==
- Drag culture in New York City
- LGBTQ culture in New York City
- List of LGBTQ people from New York City
