= Joslyn Fox =

American drag performer

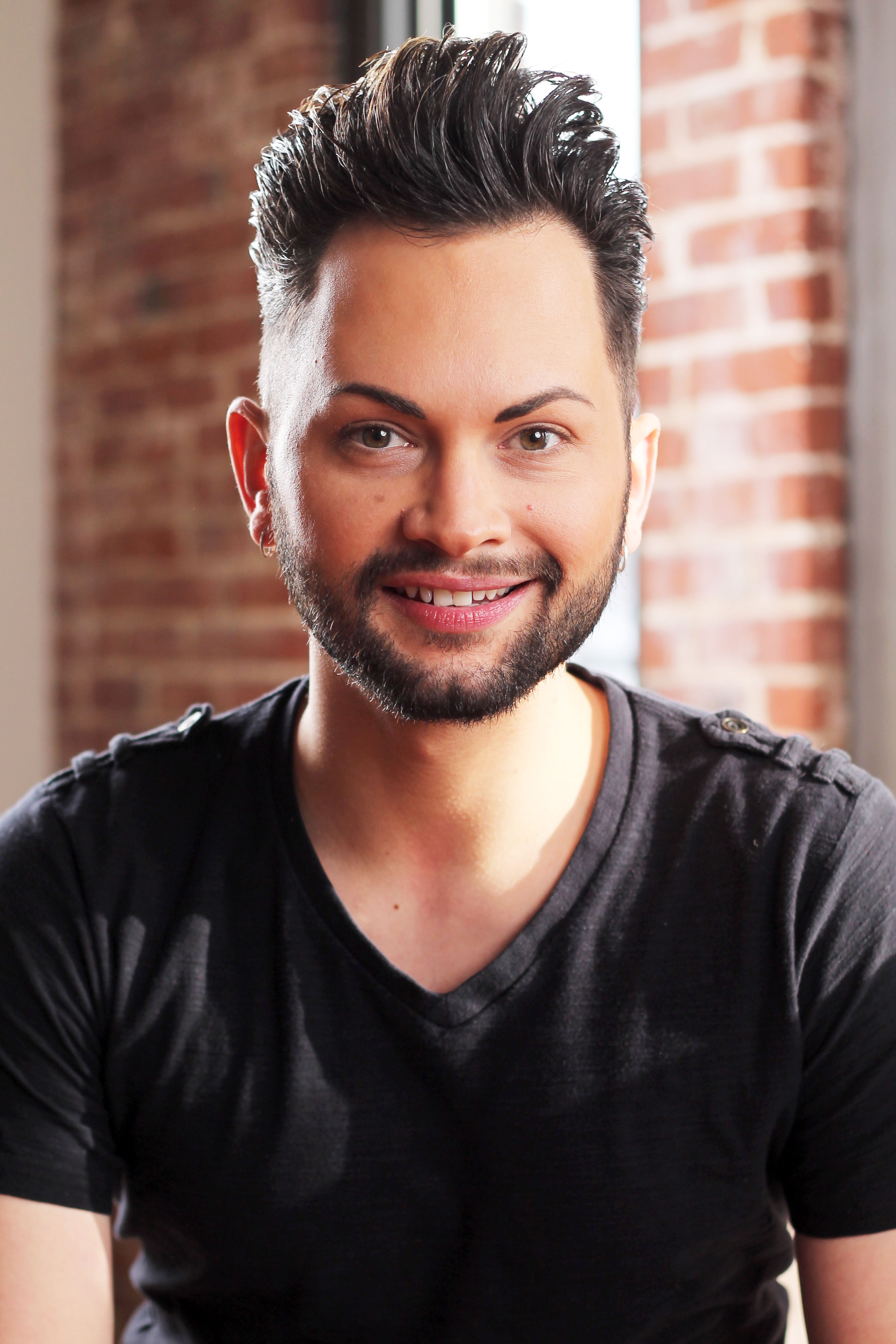
- Fox in 2017
- Born: Patrick Allen Joslyn; July 27, 1986 (age 40); Auburn, Massachusetts, U.S.
- Occupation: Drag queen
- Known for: RuPaul's Drag Race (season 6)
- Website: joslynfox.com

Joslyn Fox is the stage name of Patrick Allen Joslyn (born July 27, 1986), an American drag performer most known for competing on the sixth season of RuPaul's Drag Race.

== Career ==
Joslyn Fox competed on the sixth season of RuPaul's Drag Race where she placed sixth after being eliminated in the tenth episode. Hanne Low ranked her number 19 in Screen Rant's list of "13 Queens Eliminated Too Soon (And 7 Who Stayed Too Long)".

== Personal life ==
Joslyn lives in Worcester, Massachusetts as of 2021. He was born to Suzanne Allen Joslyn.

== Filmography ==
=== Film ===
Year	Title	Role	Ref
2016	Hurricane Bianca	Joslyn Fox	

=== Television ===
Year	Title	Role	Notes	Ref
2014	RuPaul's Drag Race (season 6)	Herself	Contestant (6th place)	
2014	RuPaul's Drag Race: Untucked (season 6)	Herself	Contestant (6th place)	
2016	Skin Wars	Herself	Episode: "Miss Skin Wars"	
2022	Julia	Herself	Episode: "Crepes Suzette"	
