= Trinity K. Bonet =

American drag queen, performer, celebrity impersonator, actor and singer

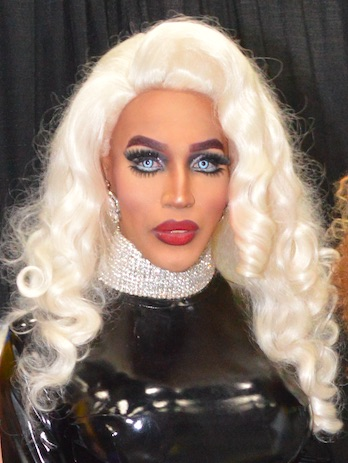
- Trinity K. Bonet at Rupaul's Drag Con LA in 2018
- Born: January 31, 1991 (age 35); Jacksonville, Florida, U.S.
- Other name: Veronica Jones Jr.
- Occupations: Drag queen, performer, impersonator, actor, singer
- Years active: 2006–present
- Known for: RuPaul's Drag Race (season 6); RuPaul's Drag Race All Stars (season 6)

Veronica Jones Jr. (born January 31, 1991), better known by the stage name Trinity Kardashian Bonét, is an American drag queen, performer, celebrity impersonator, actor and singer who came to international attention on the sixth season of RuPaul's Drag Race in 2014. Bonet released her first single, "I'm a Drag Queen" on September 6, 2017, and the accompanying music video was later released on October, 18. On May 26, 2021, she was announced as part of the cast for RuPaul's Drag Race All Stars Season 6 alongside 12 other contestants.

== Early life ==
Jones was born to Veronica Jones on January 31, 1991 in Jacksonville, Florida. Her mother is a lesbian and the family moved to Miami, Florida when she was a kid and grew up there. She started doing drag when she was fifteen years old. She was diagnosed as HIV positive in 2012. She was living in Atlanta, Georgia before competing on RuPaul's Drag Race. Her drag mother was the late Byanka Monroe, an Atlanta area entertainer that died in 2011, prior to her competing on RuPaul's Drag Race.

== Career ==
Bonet was announced as one of fourteen contestants for the sixth season of RuPaul's Drag Race in 2014. She was in the bottom two and lip synced three times during the show. She first beat April Carrion with a lip sync to Chaka Khan's "I'm Every Woman". She then beat Milk in a lip sync to "Whatta Man" by Salt-N-Pepa. She was sent home by Adore Delano in the third time, lip syncing to Paula Abdul's "Vibeology". During the show, Bonet revealed her HIV positive status, becoming the second contestant in the show's history to do so, after Ongina.

After Drag Race, Bonet walked for Marco Marco's 2014 runway show at L.A. fashion week, with other alumni. She was one of thirty drag queens featured in Miley Cyrus's 2015 VMA performance.

She received online support from Cardi B in 2018, praising Bonet's lip sync to "I Like It". She performed a lip sync tribute in front of Monica at the Scandalo Nite Club. She was the second alternate to the Miss Gay UsofA pageant in 2018.

Bonet appeared as a Whitney Houston impersonator for an opening sketch of the June 3, 2019 episode of The Ellen DeGeneres Show. That same month, New York magazine named Bonet one of the top 100 Most Powerful Drag Queens in America. She portrayed Cardi B in the music video for Taylor Swift's "You Need to Calm Down" on June 17.

On May 26, 2021, it was revealed that she would return as a competitor on the 6th season of Rupaul's Drag Race All Stars alongside 12 other contestants. On the 3rd episode of the season (Side Hustles) she won the main challenge for her acting and comedy skills and later on lost the Lip-Sync For Your Legacy to Dua Lipa's "Physical" against Lip-Sync Assassin Laganja Estranja.

In January 2022, Bonet was added to the rotating cast of a dozen Drag Race queens in RuPaul's Drag Race Live!, a Las Vegas show residency at the Flamingo Las Vegas. In March, Bonet, alongside the rest of the RuPaul's Drag Race Live! cast, performed with Katy Perry during her Play concert residency at Resorts World Las Vegas.

=== Music ===
Bonet released her first single, "I'm a Drag Queen" featuring Norman Ebony on September 6, 2017. A music video was released on October 18.

== Personal life ==
Jones came out as a transgender woman in December 2024.

== Filmography ==
=== Television ===
Year	Title	Role	Notes
2014	RuPaul's Drag Race	Herself	Contestant (7th place)
2014	RuPaul's Drag Race: Untucked	Herself	
2015	2015 MTV Video Music Awards	Herself	Backup dancer
2019	The Ellen DeGeneres Show	Herself	Whitney Houston impersonator (June 3, 2019 episode)
2020	Personal Injury Court	Herself	Guest
2021	RuPaul's Drag Race All Stars (season 6)	Herself	Contestant (5th Place)
2021	RuPaul's Drag Race All Stars: Untucked	Herself	Contestant (5th Place)

=== Music videos ===
Year	Title	Artist	Ref.
2014	"Cover Girl"	Herself (RuPaul cover)	
2017	"I'm a Drag Queen"	Herself (featuring Norman Ebony)	
2019	"You Need to Calm Down"	Taylor Swift	

=== Web series ===
Year	Title	Role	Ref.
2014	Watcha Packin'?	Herself	
2014	Ring My Bell	Herself	
2016	Hey Qween!	Herself	
2019	Bootleg Opinions	Herself	
2021	Paint Me Bitch	Herself	
2021	Whatcha Packin'	Herself	
2021	Ruvealing the Look	Herself	

== Discography ==
=== Singles ===
Year	Title
2017	"I'm a Drag Queen"

==== As featured artist ====
Title	Year	Album	Ref(s)
"Show Up Queen" (The Cast of RuPaul's Drag Race All Stars, Season 6)	2021	Non-album single	
