= Alycia Delmore =

American actress in films and theater

Alycia Delmore (born 1977) is an American actress in films and theater.

== Early life and education ==
Delmore was born in Seattle, Washington. She attended Roosevelt High School and studied at Western Washington University.

== Career ==
She is most famous for her role in Lynn Shelton's 2009 comedy film Humpday in the role of Anna, the wife of Ben (played by Mark Duplass). She also appears in Shelton's What The Funny in the role of Sarah.

She plays Kyler Mallory, fictional London stock broker in Her Interactive Inc's video game, Nancy Drew: The Haunting of Castle Malloy. She also landed a role in Seattle Shakespeare Company's Pericles. In 2015, Delmore joined the cast of Wes Hurley's acclaimed comedy series Capitol Hill along with Jinkx Monsoon, Guinevere Turner and Sarah Rudinoff.

== Filmography ==
=== Film ===
Year	Title	Role	Notes
2006	We Go Way Back	Felicia	
2008	What the Funny	Sarah	
2009	Humpday	Anna	
2010	Late Autumn	Catherine	
2011	The Off Hours	Mandy	
2011	Gayby	Linda	
2013	Touchy Feely	Ellen	
2014	Koinonia	Wife	
2016	The Architect	Caitlin	
2016	Simple Creature	Sophia	
2017	Take Me	Natalie	
2017	Outside In	Tara	
2017	Dismissed	Rachel Butler	
2021	Potato Dreams of America	American Teacher	

=== Television ===
Year	Title	Role	Notes
2012	Grimm	Vet Manager	Episode: "Woman in Black"
2015	Capitol Hill	Mayor's Attorney	Episode: "The New Mayor"
2017	Rocketmen	Mary	7 episodes

=== Video games ===
Year	Title	Role
2008	Nancy Drew: The Haunting of Castle Malloy	Kyler Mallory
2008	Nancy Drew Dossier: Lights, Camera, Curses	Casbah Gossiper
