= University of Washington School of Drama =

American drama school is Seattle, Washington

Coordinates: 47°39′34″N 122°18′24″W

School of Drama
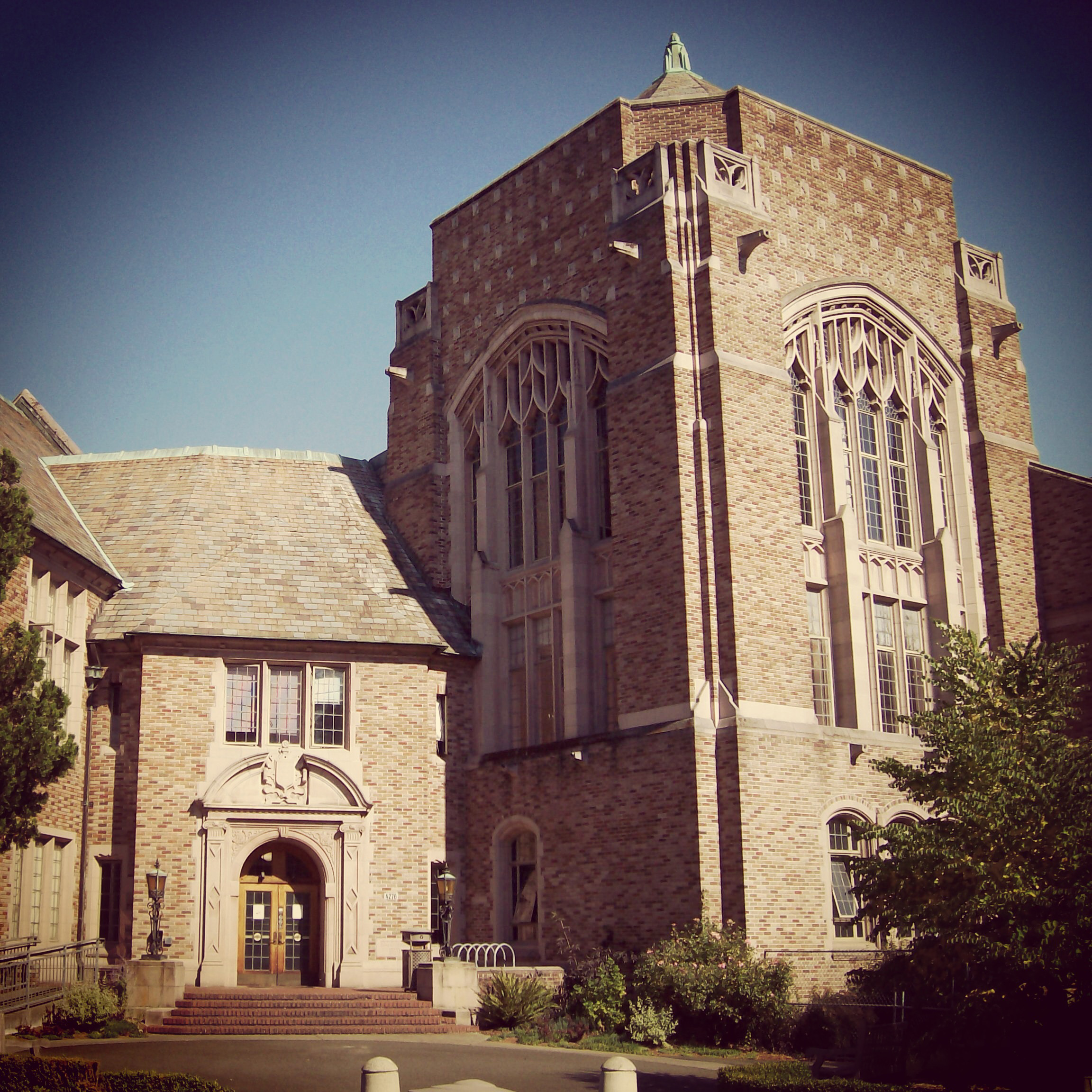
- Hutchinson Hall, home of the School of Drama
- Type: Public drama school
- Established: 1940
- Parent institution: University of Washington College of Arts and Sciences
- Director: Geoff Korf
- Undergraduates: 100
- Postgraduates: 45
- Location: Seattle, Washington, U.S.
- Website: drama.washington.edu

The School of Drama is a department-level drama school within the Arts Division at the College of Arts and Sciences at the University of Washington. It provides undergraduate and graduate degree programs.

Founded in 1940, the School of Drama offers a bachelor's degree and MFA degrees in directing, design, and acting. A Ph.D. in history theory and criticism is also offered. The MFA programs have outstanding reputations as top programs in the country. Each year, the MFA programs admit up to six actors, up to six design students, (two each for costume, scenic design, and lighting), up to three for the Ph.D. program and, every other year, two students are chosen for directing. The School of Drama presents a full subscription season of six productions every academic year, which feature MFA students and undergraduates. The Undergraduate Theater Society (UTS) founded by undergraduate James Newman in 1992, self-produces a season of its own.

== History ==
The University of Washington School of Drama traces its origins to 1919 when Glenn Hughes, a recent graduate of Stanford University, joined the faculty of the Department of Dramatic Art, a part of the English Department. Though he came to the University of Washington as a poetry fellow, Hughes soon became determined to create a first-rate drama school. From 1930 to 1961 Hughes led the Department, which became the School of Drama (SoD) in 1941. He wrote more than 60 plays; wrote and edited various literary and scholarly publications; launched one of the West Coast's first foreign film series, and established the drama program as the center of theatrical life in Seattle. Under Hughes’ leadership, the drama program became a center of Seattle's theatrical life and a respected part of its cultural milieu. In 1961, Hughes retired and was succeeded by Gregory A. Falls. Falls created the Professional Actor Training Program (PATP), a prestigious BFA (now MFA) program that placed the school among the nation's top professional acting conservatories and initiated the Ph.D. program in theatre history, theory, and criticism. It was during this time that the stream of UW drama graduates began pooling in Seattle. Graduates and former faculty stayed in the city, founding their own theatres and forming the genesis of what is today one of the country's most active and diverse theatre communities.

The School's role in establishing Seattle's vibrant theatre life was seminal. Founders and artistic directors of many of Seattle's leading theatres were first students or faculty at the School of Drama. Falls founded ACT Theatre. Duncan Ross became artistic director of the Seattle Repertory Theatre for over a decade. Alumnus M. Burke Walker founded The Empty Space Theatre, which remained in the artistic forefront for over 35 years, and former faculty member Arne Zaslove was artistic director for nearly twenty years at the Bathhouse Theatre. Alum Jenny McLauchlan Carlson was co-founder of Seattle Children's Theatre, one of the nation's leading theatres for youth, and alumnae Linda Hartzell spent 32 seasons as its artistic director. The late Ruben Sierra, alumnus and former faculty member, created one of the country's first ethnic theatre companies, The Group Theatre (formerly the Group Theatre at the Ethnic Cultural Center), which was later led by Tim Bond, a directing graduate of the UW who served as associate artistic director at Oregon Shakespeare Festival for 11 years and producing artistic director for Syracuse Stage and who is now Artistic Director of TheatreWorks Silicon Valley. Even the enormously successful Oregon Shakespeare Festival was founded by alum Angus L. Bowmer.

More recently, the Washington Ensemble Theatre was founded in 2004 by nine alumni representing every one of the school's programs. Two years later, Washington Ensemble Theatre was awarded “Best of the Fringe” by Seattle's alternative newspaper, The Stranger. Other companies founded by recent alumni include The Horse in Motion and Azeotrope theatre companies.

== Programs ==
=== Undergraduate Education (BA) ===
The Bachelor of Arts in Drama provides a general knowledge of the art of theatre and a foundation for further study or training. The major consists of a program of required courses that introduce students to the core of the art and a selection of elective courses. Majors can also elect to specialize in theatre performance or theatre design.

=== Graduate Education ===
Graduate Education at the School of Drama consists of a Doctor of Philosophy (Ph.D.) degree in theatre history, theory, and criticism and the professional Master of Fine Arts (MFA) degrees in Acting, Directing, and Design. Time after time, these degree programs are nationally recognized as top in their field. Graduate students are taught and advised by an energetic faculty, all of whom regularly work in the professional arena.

==== Doctor of Philosophy (Ph.D.) ====
The Ph.D. program provides comprehensive training in theatre scholarship with a dual emphasis on theatre history and dramatic criticism. The three-year plan of study addresses a full range of Western and Non-Western literature and practice. Through their work with Drama 101 and 201 (the SoD's general humanities courses), Ph.D. candidates gain valuable teaching experience while playing an essential role in the education of majors from every degree program offered by the University. Professor Scott Magelssen is the head of the PhD program.

==== Professional Director Training Program (MFA) ====
The Directing Program is a three-year interdisciplinary program designed to equip its students to lead and innovate at the highest levels. The course of study provides students with a wide range of practical training, production experience, and intellectual development. Two candidates are admitted to the program every other year. Nationally recognized director Valerie Curtis-Newton is the head of the directing program.

==== Design Program (MFA) ====
The Design Program is a three-year program preparing students for professional careers as scenic, costume, and lighting designers. The program fosters individual artistic vision as students grapple with intellectual and aesthetic issues and learn to think critically and creatively. The Design Program requires both theoretical and realized production work, culminating in a thesis production and professional portfolio presentations. Costume designer Deborah Trout is the head of the design program.

==== Professional Actor Training Program (PATP) (MFA) ====
The PATP is a three-year conservatory MFA program that prepares students to become top-level professional actors equipped with sensibilities and skills that will serve them throughout their careers. The program promotes the integration of all aspects of performance training. The mission of the program is to develop artists grounded in theatrical tradition who can think for themselves, who are flexible, and whose work is honest, powerful, and present within the varying demands of theatre, film, and television. Jeffrey Fracé, an expert in devised theatre and former member of SITI Company, is the head of the PATP.

== Production Season ==
- Each year, the SoD produces a subscription season of six shows produced in one of three theatres.
- PATP actors are provided with a mainstage production and a workshop level production each quarter.
- Students in the directing program are provided with two mainstage productions; a workshop in year two, and one fully funded thesis production in year three.
- The Undergraduate Program is provided with one or two mainstage productions each year, as well as casting, design, and technical opportunities in other productions.
- The Undergraduate Theater Society produces its own season in The Cabaret every year.

== Notable alumni ==
=== Acting ===
- Lenne Klingaman, actor, Waitress
- Marya Sea Kaminski, Artistic Director, Pittsburgh Public Theater
- Barzin Akhavan, actor, Network
- Frances Farmer, actor
- Daryl Anderson, actor (Lou Grant)
- John Aylward, actor (ER)
- Michael Christensen, actor (founder of Big Apple Circus and Clown Care Unit)
- Robert Culp, actor (I Spy)
- Linda Emond, actor (Life X3, 1776)
- Harry Groener, actor (Cats (Tony Award Nominee), Crazy for You, Spamalot, Buffy the Vampire Slayer)
- Clu Gulager, actor (The Tall Man, The Last Picture Show)
- Gregg Henry, actor (Body Double, The Riches)
- Wes Hurley, actor, filmmaker (Capitol Hill)
- Richard Karn, actor (Home Improvement)
- Marc Kenison, actor, aka Waxie Moon (Capitol Hill, Waxie Moon in Fallen Jewel)
- Jane Lawrence, actor (Originated the role of Gertie Cummings in Oklahoma!)
- Kyle MacLachlan, actor (Sex and the City, Desperate Housewives)
- Joel McHale, actor (The Soup, Community)
- Jeffrey Combs, actor (Re-Animator, Star Trek: Enterprise, The 4400)
- Peg Phillips, actor (Northern Exposure)
- Pamela Reed, actor (Jericho, Kindergarten Cop, Junior)
- Marc Singer, actor (The Beastmaster, V)
- Jean Smart, actor (Samantha Who? (Emmy Award), Garden State, Designing Women)
- Lois Smith, actor (Hollywoodland, Five Easy Pieces, 2 time Tony Award Nominee)
- Ann Sothern, actor (The Ann Sothern Show, The Whales of August)
- Dawn Wells, actor (Mary Ann in Gilligan's Island)
- Rainn Wilson (degree partially fulfilled), actor (The Office)
- Christopher Evan Welch (The Crucible, Streetcar Named Desire, narrator in Vicky Cristina Barcelona)
- Amy Kim Waschke, actor (four seasons at Oregon Shakespeare Festival, "The Inexplicable Redemption of Agent G")
- Aaron Blakely, actor (The Man in the High Castle)

=== Directing ===
- Tim Bond, Artistic Director, TheatreWorks Silicon Valley
- Valerie Curtis-Newton, director, Head of Directing, UW School of Drama
- Rebecca Lynn Brown, director
- Desdemona Chiang, director
- Rita Giomi, director
- Chuck Harper, director
- Linda Hartzell, director
- John Lovick, magician
- Tlaloc Rivas, director
- Lee Shallat, director
- Peggy Shannon, director
- Stepan Simek, director
- Christine Sumption, director
- Leslie Swackhamer, director
- M. Burke Walker, director
- Malika Oyetimein, director

=== Design ===
- Evan Alexander, scenic design (Bespoke Draftsman, 2016 Democratic National Convention & Super Bowl XLIX)
- Christopher L. Brown, scenic design (Production Designer, Insecure, Mad Men, The Romanoffs)
- Laura Drawbaugh, costume design (Costume Designer, All My Children)
- Kim Gill, costume design
- Allison Leach, costume design (Costume Designer, The Assassination of Gianni Versace: American Crime Story & Max Steel)
- Andrew Lieberman, scenic design (Associate Professor, NYU Tisch)
- Matthew Smucker, scenic design
- Jennifer Zeyl, scenic design (Artistic Director, Intiman Theatre)

=== Ph.D. ===
- Charlotte Canning, Director of Graduate Studies (University of Texas, Austin)
- Ellen Donkin, professor and author (Hampshire College)
- Alan Read, professor and author (Rotherheim University, London)
- Tamara Underiner, Director of Ph.D. program in Interdisciplinary Studies (Arizona State University)
- John Lutterbie, Director of Theatre (SUNY, Stoneybrook)
- Katie Johnson, professor and author (Miami University)
- Katrin Sieg, professor and author (Georgetown University)
- Lisa Jackson-Schebetta, professor and author (Skidmore College), President-elect, American Theatre and Drama Society, Editor, Theatre History Studies
- Samer Al-Saber, professor (Stanford University)
- Michelle Granshaw, Director of Graduate Studies, professor, and author (University of Pittsburgh)

== Facilities ==
Hutchinson Hall is home to the School. It houses six large studios, general classrooms, faculty, staff, and graduate student offices, design studios, a lighting lab, a Ph.D. seminar room, and computer space.

- Costume Shop is located in Hutchinson Hall.
- Drama Library is located in Hutchinson Hall.

Drama Scene Shop: Two former auto mechanic spaces offer accommodation for carpentry, metal work, paint, electric, and prop shop activities. Also in the Scene Shop are faculty and staff offices and properties storage.

Glenn Hughes Penthouse Theatre is the first purpose-built theatre in the round in the United States and seats 161. It has been placed on the National Register of Historic Places.

The Floyd and Delores Jones Playhouse is a historic theatre with a thrust stage and seats 208. Its grand re-opening, since renovation began in 2007, was October 30, 2009.

Meany Studio Theatre is in Meany Hall and is an end-stage theatre seating 253.

The Cabaret is a designated black-box theatre exclusively for undergraduate use and productions and is located in Hutchinson Hall.
