= John Lovick (magician) =

American magician, writer, and director

- Education: Montana State University (BA); University of Washington (MFA)
- Occupation: Magician

John Lovick is an American magician, writer, and director. Since the 1990s he has performed as a magician throughout the United States and Canada, as well as England, Australia, New Zealand, and Malaysia.

His performing alter ego, Handsome Jack, is a regular performer at the Magic Castle (the Academy of Magical Arts) in Hollywood, where he has served on the Board of Trustees, and where he won their 2016 Parlour Magician of the Year Award after 13 nominations. He is also the author of several books and many cover articles for the MAGIC and Genii magazines, for both of whom he has been an associate editor. In January 2018 he was featured on Genii's cover.

Lovick has invented numerous popular magic effects and regularly lectures at magic conventions. In 2006 he compiled and authored "SWITCH: Unfolding the $100 Bill Change," a comprehensive guide to the bill-switch magic trick, including its history, performance theory, and presentation ideas. He has also written “Experience: The Magic of Jon Allen”, “Mayhew: What Women Want”, "Five by Dani DaOrtiz", "Get Outta My Way, I'm Going to Hell", and co-authored “The Paper Engine”, "Repertoire", and "All In". He produced the popular magic demonstration DVD, "Reparation," which teaches his influential method for the Torn and Restored Card. In August 2016 he released a book detailing his professional magic repertoire, "The Performance Pieces & Divertissements of the Famous Handsome Jack, etc.", published by SquashPublications.com. A best seller in the magic world, its first printing sold out in fewer than three months. He co-wrote with Asi Wind a book of Wind's creations, "Repertoire", released in the spring of 2018.

On July 20, 2015, Lovick (as Handsome Jack) appeared on Penn & Teller: Fool Us and fooled them with an original Torn and Restored handbill, combined with a presentational angle involving a "Grappler" that he purchased from Harry Anderson. On April 2, 2018, Penn & Teller featured Lovick (as Handsome Jack) as the only guest performer on their one-off special "Penn & Teller: April Fool Us".

In the fall of 2022, he directed Asi Wind's award-winning off-Broadway show, "Inner Circle", which ran for over a year at the Judson Theatre in New York City.

He is currently on the faculty of the USC School of Dramatic Arts, where he is an adjunct lecturer. He lives in Los Angeles, California.

== Early life and education ==
Lovick grew up in Libby, Montana. He graduated from Montana State University before attending the University of Washington School of Drama for graduate studies, where he received an MFA in theatre direction.

== Publications ==
- MAGIC Magazine (contributing editor)
- Genii Magazine (associate editor)
- “The Paper Engine” (co-author) (2002, Hermetic Press)
- "SWITCH: Unfolding the $100 Bill Change" (2006, Murphy's Magic Supplies)
- “Experience: The Magic of Jon Allen” (2009, Vanishing Inc.)
- “Mayhew: What Women Want” (2014, Hermetic Press)
- "The Performance Pieces & Divertissements of the Famous Handsome Jack, etc." (2016, Squash Publications)
- "Secrets" by Anthony Owen (additional material by John Lovick) (2017, Vanishing Inc.)
- "Repertoire" by Asi Wind (with John Lovick) (2018)
- "Before We Begin" by Asi Wind (edited by John Lovick) (2020, Vanishing Inc.)
- "Get Outta My Way, I'm Going to Hell" (2021), book 9 of Vanishing Inc.'s Astonishing Essay series.
- "Five from Dani DaOrtiz" (2022)
- "Vallarino" (2023, Vanishing Inc.)
- "Piff the Magic Book" (co-written by John Lovick) (2023, Vanishing Inc.)
- "All In" (co-author with Allan Ackerman)(2024, Vanishing Inc.)
- "Repertoire II" by Asi Wind (with John Lovick) (2024)
- "Six from Dani DaOrtiz" (2025)

== Awards ==
- 2015 Penn & Teller: Fool Us Trophy
- 2016 Parlour Magician of the Year, Academy of Magical Arts
- 2016 Billy McComb/Jay Marshall Parlour Magician Award
- 2016 Allan Slaight "Sharing Secrets" Award
