= Waxie Moon =

Waxie Moon may refer to:

- Waxie Moon (performer), gender-bending neo-burlesque persona of the performer Marc Kenison
- Waxie Moon (film), a documentary directed by Wes Hurley about the performer

== See also ==
- Waxing moon
