= Azeotrope (theatre) =

Seattle-based theater company

- Formation: 2010
- Type: Theatre group
- Location: Seattle, USA
- Artistic director(s): Richard Nguyen Sloniker, Desdemona Chiang
- Notable members: Red Light Winter, Jesus Hopped the 'A' Train

Azeotrope is Seattle-based theatre company specializing in new work that focuses on bringing voice and representation to the marginalized and invisible.

== History ==
Azeotrope was founded in 2010 by Seattle actor Richard Nguyen Sloniker and director Desdemona Chiang, who met as graduate students at the University of Washington School of Drama. The company debuted its first production, Red Light Winter by Adam Rapp, and was subsequently invited to participate in ACT Theatre's Central Heating Lab program. In 2012, they produced Jesus Hopped the 'A' Train by Stephen Adly Guirgis, which won the 2012 Gregory Awards for Outstanding Production, Outstanding Direction, Outstanding Scenic Design, and Outstanding Supporting Actor; as well as the Gypsy Lee Rose awards and Footlight Awards.

Azeotope's most noted production to date is Sound by Don Nguyen, bilingual play performed in American Sign Language and spoken English, featuring a mixed ensemble of Deaf and hearing actors.

In 2018, they produced Building the Wall by Robert Schenkkan, a two actor drama set in the near dystopian future where President Donald Trump's anti-immigration policies lead to the mass detention of thousands of people and devastating consequences.

== Awards and honors ==
- 2013 Gypsy Rose Lee Awards - Excellence in Direction of a Play (Desdemona Chiang, Gruesome Playground Injuries)
- 2012 Gregory Awards - Outstanding Production (Jesus Hopped the A Train)
- 2012 Gregory Awards - Outstanding Director (Desdemona Chiang)
- 2012 Gregory Awards - Outstanding Set Design (Deanna Zibello, Jesus Hopped the A Train)
- 2012 Gregory Awards - Outstanding Supporting Actor (Ray Tagavilla, Jesus Hopped the A Train)
