= Colby Keller =

American pornographic actor and artist

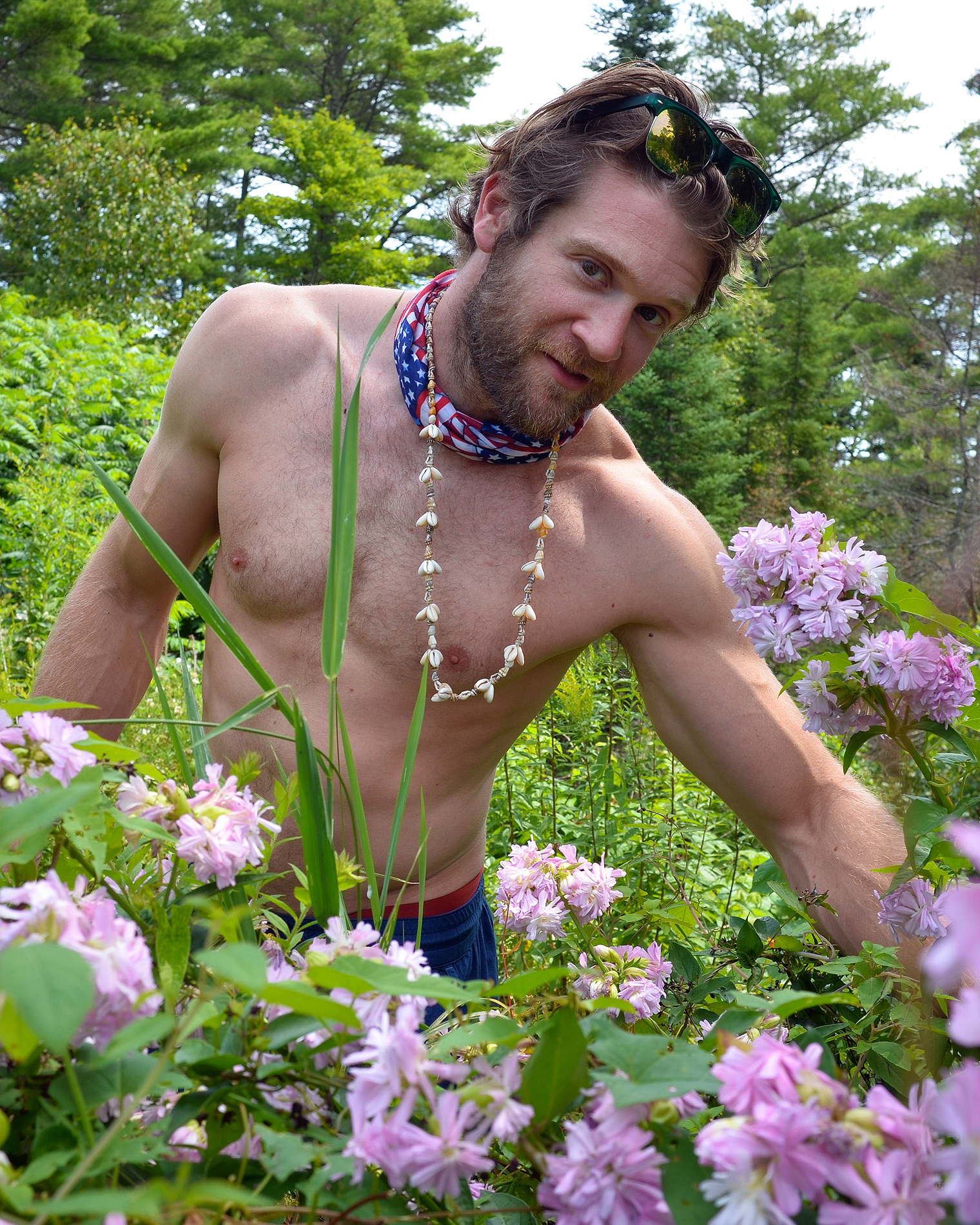
- Keller in Maine, 2014
- Born: October 18, 1980 (age 46); Ypsilanti, Michigan, U.S.
- Other name: Colby
- Education: University of Houston (BA); Maryland Institute College of Art (MFA)
- Height: 6 ft 2 in (1.88 m)

Richard John Sawka II (born October 18, 1980), better known as Colby Keller, is an American visual artist and former pornographic actor. His career in porn film started in 2004 at Sean Cody and subsequently expanded to include such studios as Cocksure Men, Randy Blue, Titan Men, Falcon, CockyBoys and Men.com. Keller has also appeared in the short Zolushka, a gay retelling of Cinderella, and in the series Capitol Hill, both by the filmmaker Wes Hurley.

== Biography ==
Born October 18, 1980, in Michigan, Colby Keller was raised in Texas where he graduated from the University of Houston with a bachelor's degree in anthropology. In addition, he is a graduate of The Maryland Institute College of Art, with a Master of Fine Arts (MFA) in visual and performing arts.

During his time performing in gay porn, Keller continued to work as an artist. His two most notable art projects are Pieces of Eight and Everything But Lenin, both collaborative performance pieces. Pieces of Eight involved multiple projects and multiple collaborations while Everything But Lenin involved giving away all of his earthly possessions with the exception a large metal plaque of Lenin and was precipitated by an eviction notice presented to residents of his Baltimore apartment complex in March 2014. Those who took part received a signed certificate as project participants.

In addition to his porn performances and art projects, Keller appeared in a series of sex advice videos (titled In Bed With Colby Keller) for Manhunt. The series ran from 2012 until 2014 and resulted in 62 videos.

In 2012, Keller appeared in a masquerade-themed music video for the song "After Dark", by dance artists Undercover. And, in his 2013 music video for "Cannibal", Natti Vogel enlisted Keller to play a hooded witch to his tempted Hansel in a recreation of Hansel and Gretel.

In 2013, Keller collaborated with artist Cameron Stalheim on a project called Myth as Object, which resulted in a 2014 exhibit as Stalheim's MFA graduating thesis at the Maryland Institute College of Art. Keller's body was cast in silicone to create a thirty-foot long merman sculpture in his likeness.

In 2014, Keller sold his belongings and began a project Colby Does America, composed of porn scenes filmed across every state in the United States.

In 2016, Keller was presented the Cybersocket Web Award for Best Personality. He is a featured model in the 2016 Spring/Summer Vivienne Westwood Mirror the World campaign.

In 2017, he appeared in two episodes of the third season of EastSiders.

== Politics ==
Keller is a communist who credits his communist beliefs to a strict Christian upbringing with the Assemblies of God.

Keller voted for Donald Trump in the 2016 United States presidential election, stating, "I'm going to vote for Trump! I think he's a destabilizing force ... I don't support or endorse any of Trump’s policies. I just think it'll escalate the problem, which is the best we can hope for."

== Partial filmography ==
Year	Title	Production company
2004	Solo	Sean Cody
2005	Alabama Takedown	Titan Media
2006	Men of Deepwater Beach	Titan Media
2008	Leo Giamani	Randy Blue
2009	XXX	Falcon Studios
2009	Naked Kombat	Kink
2010	Samuel Colt	Cocksure Men
2010	Tales From Last Summer	Dragon Media
2010	Laid Off	Falcon Studios
2010	Depths of Desire	Falcon Studios
2011	The Other Side of Aspen VI: Angelo Marconi	Falcon Studios
2011	Bold Moves	Falcon Studios
2011	Indiscretion	Falcon Studios
2011	Late Night Hit	Hard Friction
2011	The Sauna	Men.com
2011	Alone on the Range	Raging Stallion
2011	Golden Gate 2: Ashley Ryder	Naked Sword
2012	Cole Streets	Cocksure Men
2012	MILK IT	Treasure Island Media
2012	The Boardroom	Men.com
2012	Lousy Artist	Men.com
2012	Secret Rendez-Vous	Men.com
2012	The Vandal	Men.com
2012	Dirty Director	Dragon Media
2013	A Thing of Beauty: Part One	CockyBoys
2013	A Thing of Beauty: Free To Be Me	CockyBoys
2013	A Thing of Beauty: The Gift	CockyBoys
2013	Talk To Me	CockyBoys
2013	Armed Forces Physical	Dragon Media
2013	Cowboys Part 1	Falcon Studios
2013	Releasing Nerves	Men.com
2013	Dream Team	Naked Sword
2013	Relentless	Raging Stallion
2014	XXXMas Special: Colby Keller & Tayte Hanson	CockyBoys
2014	Gay of Thrones Part 4	Men.com
2014	Colby Does Maryland	Colby Does America
2014	Zolushka	
2015	Capitol Hill	HuffPost
2015	Premiere: BCALLA FW15 Collection Colby Does NY	CockyBoys/Colby Does America
2016	High Maintenance	HBO
2017	EastSiders	Netflix

== See also ==
- List of male performers in gay porn films
