= Market Magic Shop =

Magic shop at Pike Place Market in Seattle, Washington, U.S.

Coordinates: 47.6084°N 122.3409°W

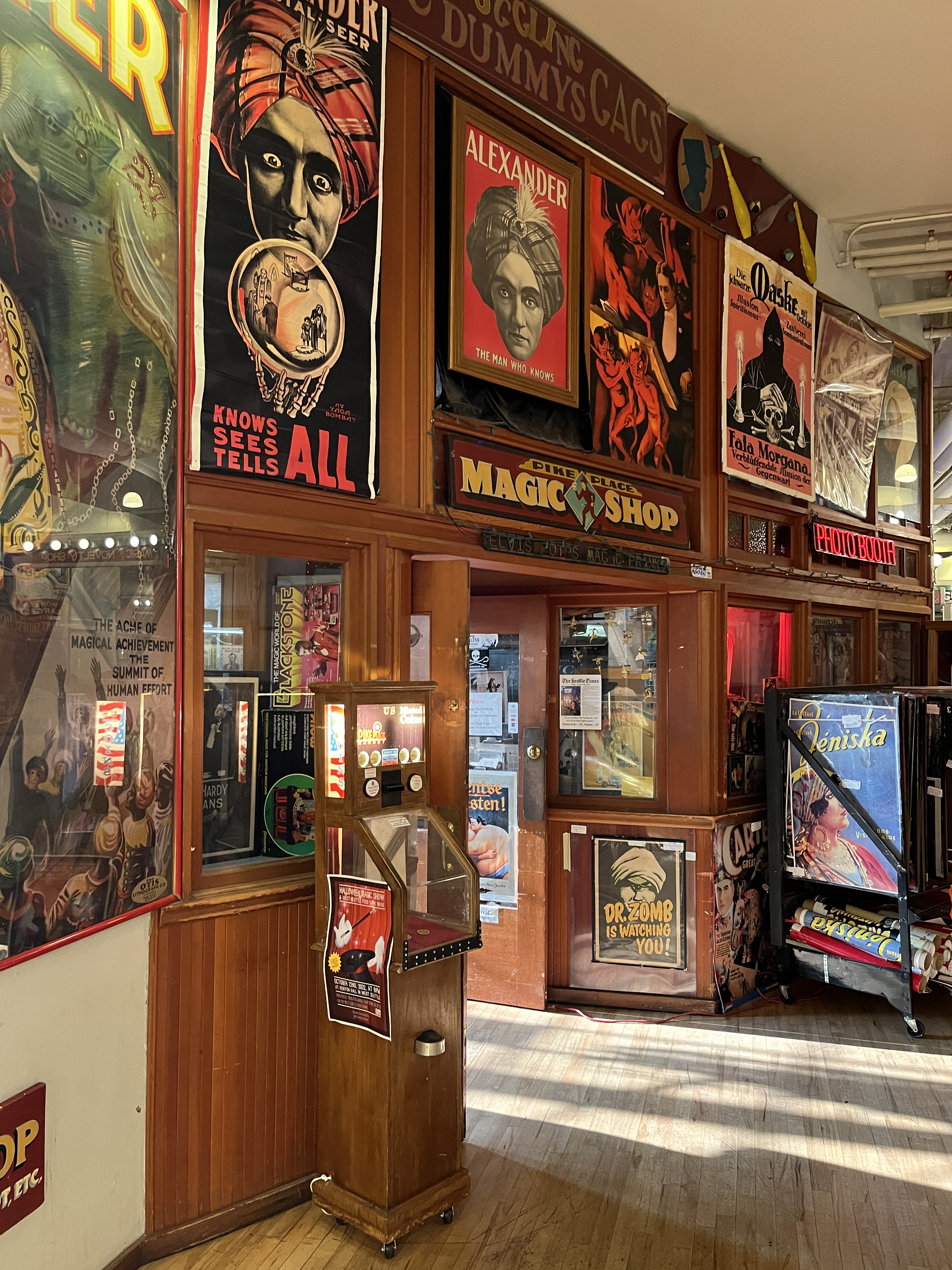
- The shop's entrance, 2022
- Founded: 1974; 52 years ago
- Headquarters: 1501 Pike Place Apt, 427, Seattle, Washington, United States
- Owners: Sheila Lyon; Darryl Beckmann

The Market Magic Shop (also known as the Market Magic & Novelty Shop and the Pike Place Magic Shop) is a magic store at Seattle's Pike Place Market, in the U.S. state of Washington.

== Description ==
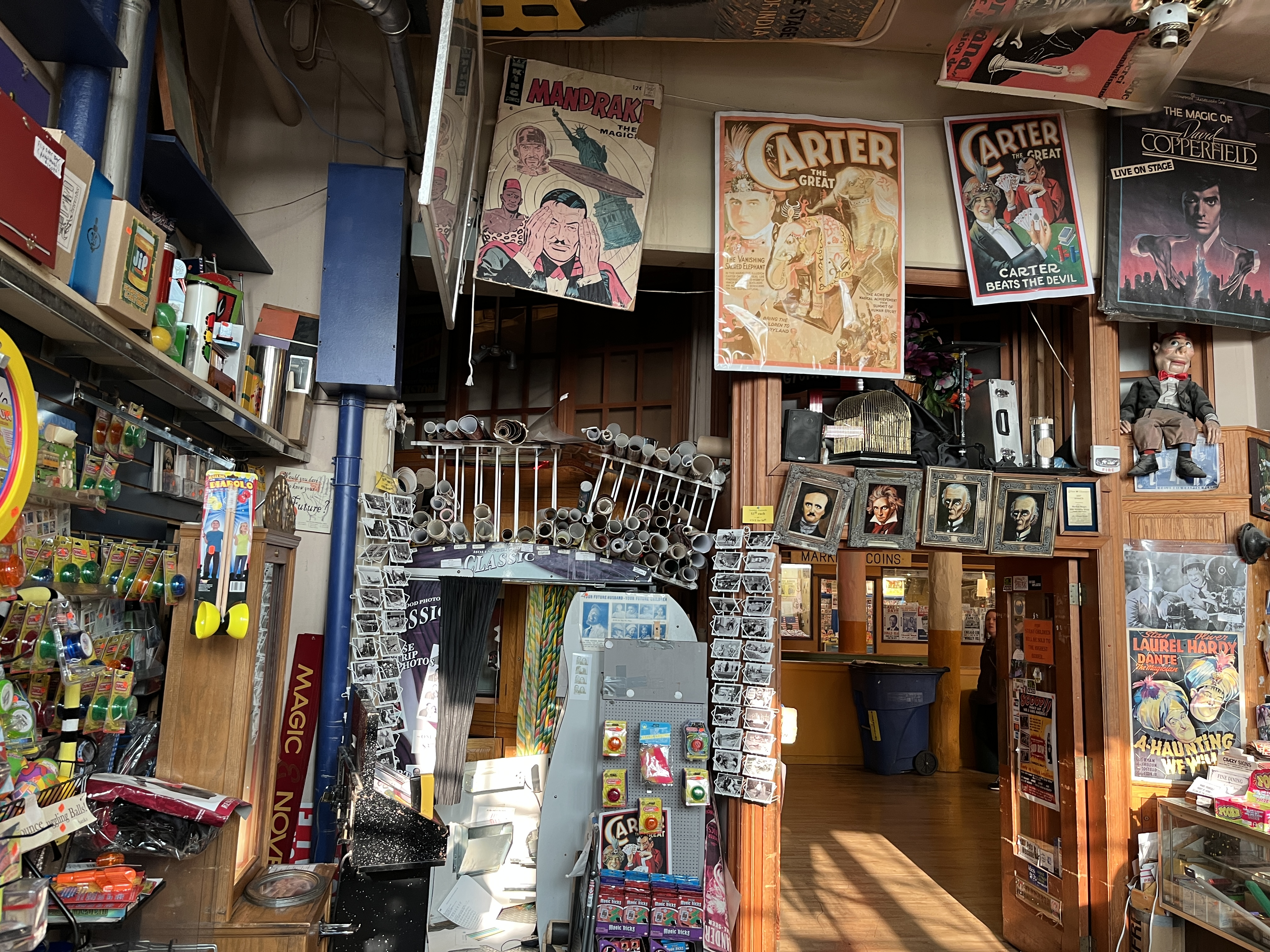
Interior, 2022

The magic store is located at Pike Place Market in Central Waterfront, Seattle. Frommer's says, "Located on the Down Under's fourth level, the Market Magic Shop sells all kinds of tricks and paraphernalia for magicians." In 2018, John Prentice of Seattle Refined wrote, "Market Magic stocks a wide variety of reasonably priced miracles starting at under $10, something for every age and skill level, from complete kits for the beginner to complex illusions used by the best in the business." The shop has stocked century-old posters, juggling pins, practical joke devices, and various tricks.

Operated by spouses Sheila Lyon and Darryl Beckmann, the business has been described by Harrison Jacobs of Business Insider as one of the oldest operating magic shops in the United States and a "staple" of Pike Place Market. Employees are professional magicians and the shop also has an automated fortune-telling machine.

== History ==
Market Magic Shop was established in 1974. The business received relief funding during the COVID-19 pandemic, and attempted to attract visitors using social media.

== Reception ==
In 2016, Brian Kelly of the Bainbridge Island Review described the business as an "iconic magic shop in the Pike Place Market that's been a must-see for visitors and tourists to Seattle for more than 40 years". Sarah Anne Lloyd of Curbed Seattle has said visiting the shop "is a pretty mandatory part of the Pike Place Market experience, with all the classics of a Houdini-style magic store -- illusion supplies, sleight-of-hand tricks, pranks, that kind of thing".

Lonely Planet has said, "Selling fake dog poop, stink bombs, water-squirting rings and magic tricks, this Pike Place magic shop is heaven for aspiring magicians, school kids, and grown-ups who wish they were still school kids.
