= Luly Yang =

Taiwanese-American fashion designer

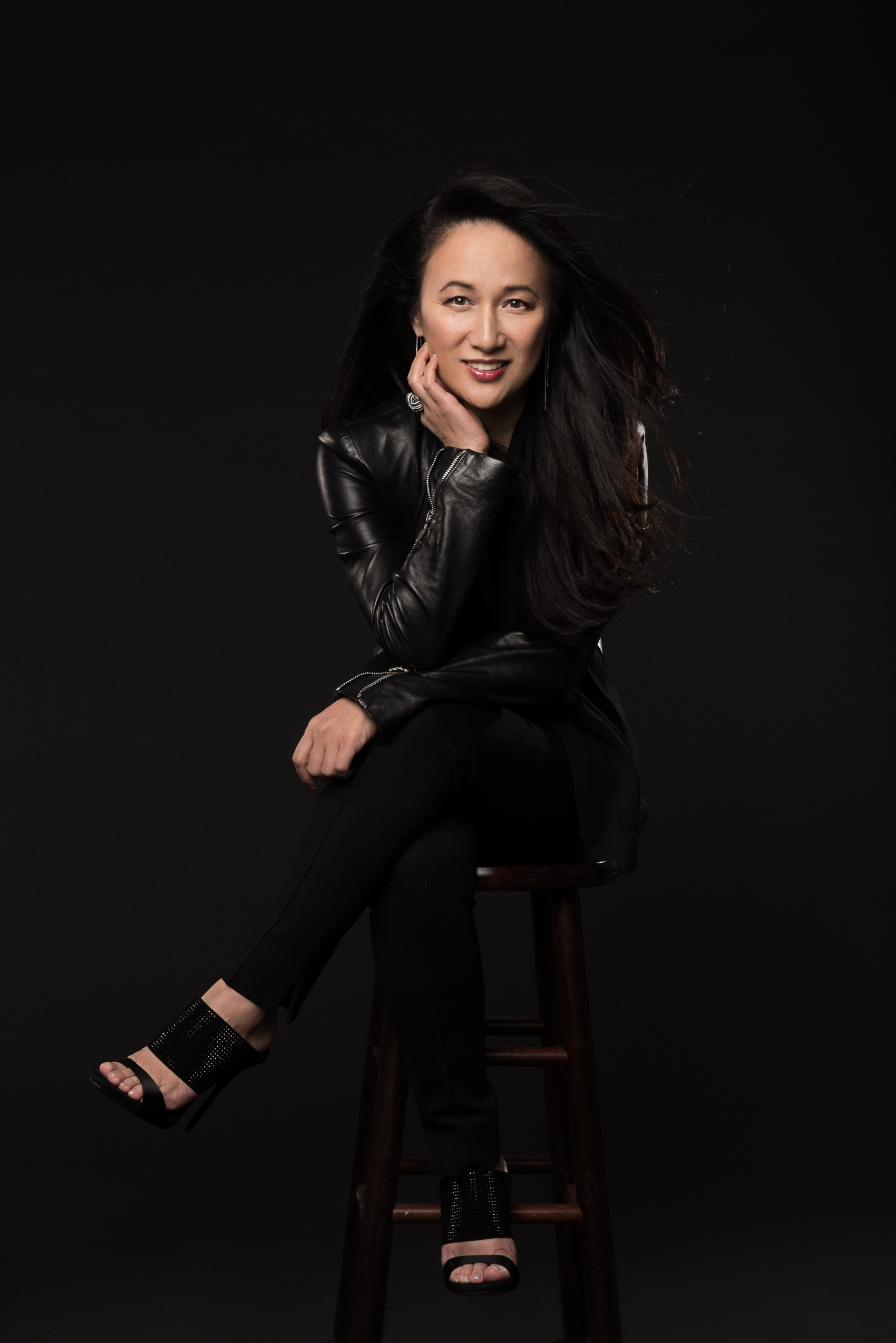
- Yang in 2016
- Born: Taiwan
- Education: University of Washington (BA)
- Occupation: Fashion designer
- Website: lulyyang.com

Luly Yang is a Taiwanese-American fashion designer.

Yang founded a couture fashion, Luly Yang Couture, in 2000 in Seattle. After completing the uniform design for Alaska Airlines employees in 2018, Yang founded Luly Yang Design Group.

== Early life and education ==
Yang was born in Taiwan. Her family moved to Bellevue, Washington, when she was ten years old.

Yang received a Bachelor of Arts degree with a major in graphic design from the School of Art + Art History + Design at the University of Washington in 1990.

== Career ==
In 1999, Yang created her signature Monarch Butterfly Gown for a fashion show benefiting the Art with Heart Foundation, and began a move into fashion design.

Yang founded her couture fashion, Luly Yang Couture, in 2000 in Seattle. In 2004, she moved her design studio to the Fairmont Olympic Hotel on 4th Avenue in Downtown Seattle.

In 2008, Yang showcased her couture and bridal collections at The Fairmont Hotel in Beijing as well as accessories designed for the new location. Her collections became available in Europe five years later when he work was exhibited at the department store Popp & Kretschmer in Vienna, Austria.

In 2007, Yang was commissioned by the Pan Pacific Hotel to design their new uniforms for their grand opening in Anaheim, California. In 2009, she was invited to design the costumes for Teatro ZinZanni, whose cast included Liliane Montevecchi.

In 2016, Yang was selected to redesign the uniforms for Alaska Airlines. These uniforms was originally planned to be worn by Alaska Airlines staff members in 2018. They eventually rolled out in 2019. The design of the uniforms was inspired by Chinese culture. Such features include resemblances to a qipao and a "Chinese-style" collar.

=== Philanthropy ===
Yang's shows have additionally benefited non-profit organizations such as Camp Korey, Seattle Children's Hospital, Swedish Medical Center, Susan G. Komen For the Cure, Treehouse, Pacific Northwest Ballet, Smuin Ballet San Francisco, Seattle Symphony, Fred Hutch Cancer Research Center, and Providence Senior & Community Services. Luly Yang worked with Russell Wilson to raise funds for Strong Against Cancer.

== Reception ==
Luly Yang has the following awards.

- The Nellie Cashman “Woman Business Owner of the Year” Award 2007
- Puget Sound Business Journal “Women of Influence” 2010, For outstanding business and philanthropic contributions to the Puget Sound Community
- The Knot “Best of Weddings Pick” 2008, 2009, 2010, 2012.
- University of Washington 150th years of Creativity “Timeless Award” 2012.
- Puget Sound Business Journal “Woman of Influence” 2012
- Hong Kong Association of Washington, HKAW “Outstanding Business Leader Award” 2015
- Induction into the Robert Chinn Foundation's Asian Hall of Fame
