= School of Art + Art History + Design =

Art school at the University of Washington

Coordinates: 47°39′30.72″N 122°18′23.14″W

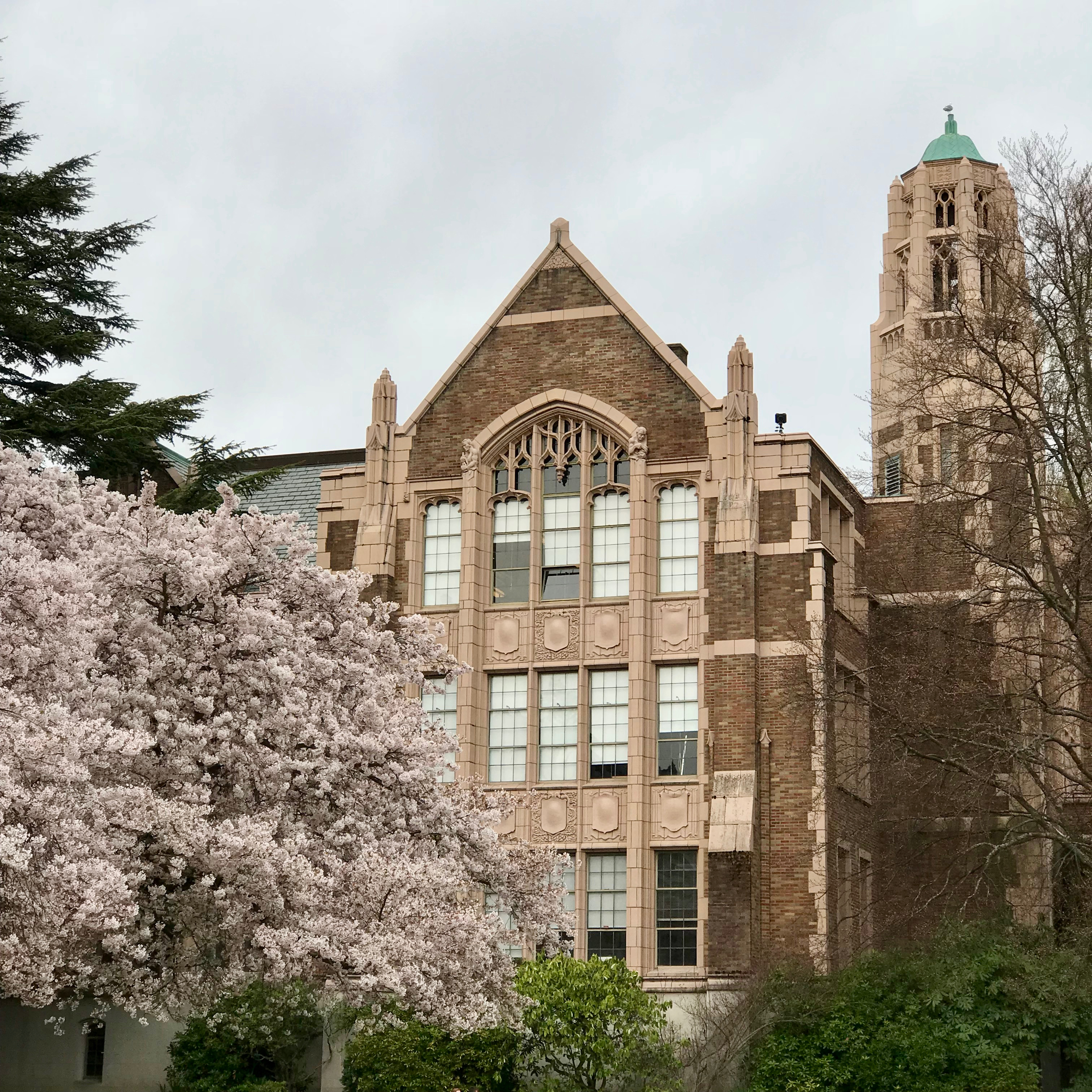
- Art Building
- Type: Public art school
- Established: 1935
- Parent institution: University of Washington College of Arts and Sciences
- Director: Annabelle Gould
- Academic staff: 79
- Administrative staff: 24
- Students: 608
- Undergraduates: 564
- Postgraduates: 44
- Location: Seattle, Washington
- Website: art.washington.edu

The School of Art + Art History + Design is a department-level school within the Arts Division at the College of Arts and Sciences at the University of Washington. The school offers undergraduate and graduate degree programs.

== History ==
Art has been taught at the University of Washington off and on since around 1890. The School of Art was established in 1935. The school was renamed the School of Art + Art History + Design in 2015. The school is under the Arts Division at the College of Arts and Sciences at the University of Washington. It offers undergraduate and graduate degree programs.

There have been nine directors of the school from 1935 to the present. The current director is Annabelle Gould, who is also a Professor of Design: Visual Communication Design.

The school was one of the first to offer Master of Fine Arts degrees in the United States. It is in the top 20 best fine arts graduate programs as ranked by U.S. News & World Report.

== Divisions and degrees ==
The school consists of three divisions to represent the three major areas of study.

The Division of Art grants Bachelor of Arts (BA) degrees with concentrations in Painting + Drawing, Photo/Media, and 3D4M: ceramics + glass + sculpture. It also offers Master of Fine Arts (MFA) degrees in New Genres, Painting + Drawing, and 3D4M: ceramics + glass + sculpture.

The Division of Art History grants Bachelor of Arts (BA), Master of Arts (MA), and Doctor of Philosophy (PhD) degrees.

The Division of Design offers Bachelor of Design (BDes) degrees in Interaction Design, Industrial Design, and Visual Communication Design. It also grants Master of Design (MDes) degrees.

== Faculty and staff ==
The school has more than 35 full-time faculty, 30 affiliate/adjunct faculty, and a number of part-time instructors each year. There are more than 20 staff members who provide administrative, curatorial, and technical services.

Several of the faculty have won major honors and awards. In the Division of Art, Aaron Flint Jamison was a 2017 Hallie Ford Fellow and had work included in the 2017 Whitney Biennial; Sangram Majumdar received a 2023 Gottlieb Foundation' grant, a 2018 New York Foundation for the Arts grant in Painting; and a 2010 Purchase Award from American Academy of Arts and Letters; Helen O'Toole was a winner of the 2015 Contemporary Northwest Art Awards and has received a 2016 John Simon Guggenheim Memorial Foundation Fellowship; Timea Tihanyi won a 2018 Neddy Artist Award.; Whitney Lynn is a 2024 Black Cube Artist Fellow. In the Division of Art History, Estelle Lingo was a 2016–2018 Andrew W. Mellon Professor at the National Gallery of Art's Center for Advanced Study in the Visual Arts (CASVA); Haicheng Wang received a 2017 New Directions Fellowship from The Andrew W. Mellon Foundation; and Marek Wieczorek is a 2020 NIAS Fellow at the Netherlands Institute for Advanced Study in the Humanities and Social Sciences. In the Division of Design, Kristine Matthews won a 2018 Educator Award from the Society for Experiential Graphic Design (SEGD). She and her firm, Studio Matthews, have won multiple awards, including 2019 recognition from Communication Arts for an exhibition about University of Washington OMA&D. Sang-gyeun Ahn was an Amazon Catalyst Fellow. Interaction Design faculty Audrey Desjardins and Axel Roesler have won research awards from Mozilla and Google respectively.

== Facilities ==
The school's primary home is the Art Building on the main campus of the University of Washington in Seattle. It is part of the Liberal Arts Quadrangle, commonly known as the Quad. This building contains numerous teaching studios, classrooms, and offices. It also houses the Art Library, which is part of the University of Washington Libraries. The school's main exhibition space, the Jacob Lawrence Gallery, is in the Art Building. The gallery is named after Jacob Lawrence, who taught in the school from 1970–1985 and is one of the school's most well-known faculty members.

Two other facilities are part of the school. The Ceramic and Metal Arts Building houses studios and production spaces for ceramics, glass, and sculpture. It also has two exhibition galleries. The Sand Point Gallery and studio spaces are in Building 5 in Magnuson Park.

== Notable alumni ==
- Graham Boettcher
- Dale Chihuly
- James Claussen
- Chuck Close
- Renee Erickson
- Joe Feddersen
- Anne Focke
- Bill Holm
- Steve Kaneko
- Harold Kawaguchi
- Alison Wyckoff Milliman
- Marvin Oliver
- Mark Randall
- Jenny Sabin
- Roger Shimomura
- Barbara Earl Thomas
- George Tsutakawa
- Rodrigo Valenzuela
- Patti Warashina
- Maurice Woods
- Art Wolfe
- Jonas Wood
- Robin Wright
- Luly Yang
