= BenDeLaCreme =

American drag performer

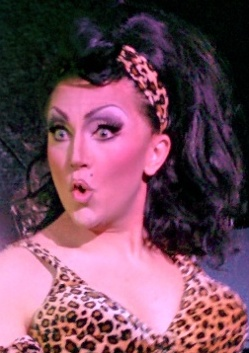
- BenDeLaCreme performing in 2014
- Born: Benjamin Brock Hamlet Putnam; September 24, 1981 (age 45); Litchfield, Connecticut, U.S.
- Education: School of the Art Institute of Chicago
- Occupations: Drag performer; Burlesque performer
- Known for: RuPaul's Drag Race (season 6); RuPaul's Drag Race All Stars (season 3)
- Title: Miss Congeniality
- Predecessor: Ivy Winters
- Successor: Katya Zamolodchikova
- Musical career
- Origin: Seattle, Washington, U.S.
- Website: bendelacreme.com

BenDeLaCreme (born September 24, 1981) is the stage persona of Benjamin Brock Hamlet Putnam, an American drag queen, burlesque performer, and actor based in Seattle, Washington. He is known for being a contestant on the sixth season of RuPaul's Drag Race and the third season of RuPaul's Drag Race: All Stars. He is also known for his solo shows Ready To Be Committed, Terminally Delightful, Inferno A-Go-Go and Cosmos, and as co-creator and host of burlesque revues Freedom Fantasia and Homo for the Holidays.

== Early life ==
Putnam grew up in Litchfield, Connecticut, attending Litchfield High School and Walnut Hill School, from which he graduated in 2000. During his performance on Drag Race, Putnam revealed that he was bullied as a child for being overweight, "weird", and gay. His mother, who had been the positive voice to counteract this, died of cancer when he was 13 years old. Putnam was also open about his struggles with depression, revealing that his "terminally delightful" drag persona helped him overcome this.

== Artistry ==
Putnam's stage name is a play off the French term crème de la crème, which, translated, means "cream of the cream" or "best of the best", combined with a play on his given first name. He commonly refers to himself as either "Ben" or "DeLa" to distinguish between the private, male persona (Ben) and public, female one (DeLa). He is also sometimes referred to as "Bendela", a take on the name Vendela. In an interview with Artes Magazine, he explained "I consider BenDeLaCreme to be the very best of Ben which is the name of the gentleman that I share a body with. DeLa is how I refer to the lady part of me. If you say Ben you're talking to that guy. If you say DeLa you are talking to me."

Putnam credits his interest in drag and burlesque to seeing Varla Jean Merman's Holiday Ham in Boston in 2001. He was inspired by Merman's theatrical, character-driven approach to drag performance. DeLa considers drag to be "an inherently political act", an opportunity to encourage people to think about complex issues related to gender and sexuality through humor and theatre. Her solo shows combine comedy, song, burlesque, dance, and video clips (often DeLa herself in other roles). DeLa's costume style is reminiscent of iconic 1950s pin-up girls. She cites dancer and actress Ann Miller as an early influence.

== Career ==
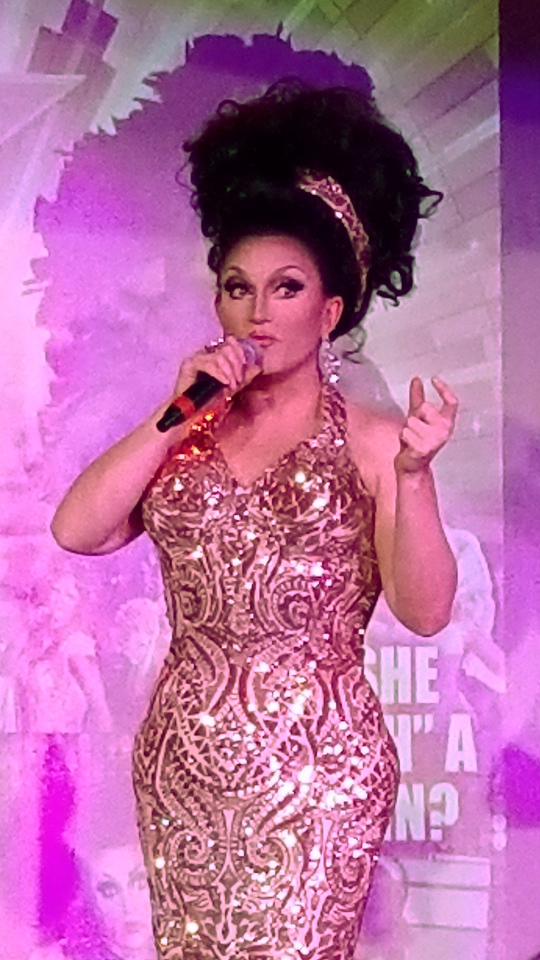
BenDeLaCreme performing during RuPaul's Drag Race All Stars season 3, 2018

Putnam's career began in Chicago in 2002, while he was pursuing a BFA degree at the School of the Art Institute of Chicago from 2001 to 2003. Although his course of study focused on painting, he found himself more interested in performance art.

Her first opportunities to perform came at drag revues at Chicago-area gay bars. Early on, she was exposed to a more explicitly feminist, message-driven side of drag culture by the Chicago Kings, a drag king troupe with which she frequently performed as the token "queen". At the same time, DeLa made a conscious decision to present a more positive, cheerful persona during her shows, even when addressing serious subject matter such as prejudice, death, and depression.

Since the mid-2000s, she has been based in Seattle, Washington. She is the hostess for The Atomic Bombshells burlesque troupe and teaches at Seattle's Academy of Burlesque. DeLa has collaborated with many members of the Seattle burlesque community, including Drag Race Season 5 winner Jinkx Monsoon. She runs the theatrical production company DeLouRue Presents, creating and performing in popular holiday revue shows Freedom Fantasia and Homo for the Holidays, with burlesque duo Kitten La Rue and Lou Henry Hoover, her friends and frequent collaborators.

BenDeLaCreme's touring solo shows include Terminally Delightful, Cosmos, and Inferno A-Go-Go. She has also appeared in several films by filmmaker Wes Hurley, including the documentary Waxie Moon, Waxie Moon in Fallen Jewel, and as a narrator of the series Capitol Hill.

At the 2019 MAC Awards, BenDeLaCreme was presented with an award in the category "Major Impersonation/Characterization/Drag Artist" for her show Inferno A-Go-Go.

In December 2020, BenDeLaCreme's collaboration film with Jinkx Monsoon, The Jinkx and Dela Holiday Special was released, and can be streamed on Hulu.

In 2023, BenDeLaCreme was announced to be a part of Unilever’s "United We Stand" program.

== RuPaul's Drag Race ==
In 2014, BenDeLaCreme appeared in the sixth season of RuPaul's Drag Race, where she placed fifth and was voted Miss Congeniality by viewers. In 2018, she appeared in the third season of RuPaul's Drag Race: All Stars, where, after a record-breaking fifth challenge win in episode 6, she chose to eliminate herself, claiming she had already proven herself and that she felt the other remaining contestants wanted the crown more than she did. Many fans were shocked at this decision, as her track record heavily favored her to win the entire competition. DeLa is the only Drag Race contestant so far to win five challenges in a single season, win four episodes consecutively and, at the time, win the "Snatch Game" challenge on more than one season (later joined by season 7 and All Stars 6 contestant Ginger Minj, as well as Season 5 and All Stars 7 contestant Jinkx Monsoon).

== Personal life ==
She dated Gus Lanza from 2015 to 2023. Putnam says they are still best friends and business partners. She owns two cats, Wayne and Garth, and a dog, Reggie.

== Filmography ==
=== Film ===
Year	Title	Role
2014	Drag Becomes Her	Herself
2015	Waxie Moon in Fallen Jewel	Herself
2019	Trixie Mattel: Moving Parts	Herself
2020	The Jinkx and DeLa Holiday Special	Herself
2020	Happiest Season	Miss L'Teau

=== Television ===
Year	Title	Role	Notes
2014	RuPaul's Drag Race	Contestant	Season 6; 5th place, Miss Congeniality
2014	RuPaul's Drag Race: Untucked	Contestant	Season 6
2018	RuPaul's Drag Race All Stars	Contestant	Season 3; 6th place after self elimination
2021	Dragging the Classics: The Brady Bunch	Greg Brady	
2022	Queer for Fear: The History of Queer Horror	Herself	3 episodes
2023	The Daily Show	Herself	Guest
2023	Drag Me to Dinner	Herself	Hulu original reality series
2023	Celebrity Family Feud	Herself	Guest

=== Web series ===
Year	Title	Role	Notes	Ref.
2014	Capitol Hill	Herself	Presenter	
2014	Transformations	Herself	Guest	
2014	Ring My Bell	Herself	Guest	
2018	Whatcha Packin'	Herself	Guest	
2018	How To Makeup	Herself	Episode: "Unclockable Hairline"	
2022	Binge Queens	Herself	Recurring	
2023, 2025	The Pit Stop	Herself	Guest with Jinkx Monsoon in 2023	

=== Podcasts ===
Year	Title	Role	Notes	Ref.
2023	Minor Revelations (with Drew Droege)	Herself	Guest	
2023	Hello Isaac (with Isaac Mizrahi)	Herself	Guest	
2023	The Fire UpStairs	Herself	Guest	

== Discography ==
=== As lead artist ===
Song	Year	Album
"Internationolidays" (with Jinkx Monsoon)	2021	Non-album singles
"Looking at the Lights" (with Jinkx Monsoon)	2022	Non-album singles

=== As featured artist ===
Year	Title	Album
2016	"The Nativity Twist"	Christmas Queens 2
2018	"Drag Up Your Life" (RuPaul featuring BeBe Zahara Benet, BenDeLaCreme, Kennedy Davenport, Shangela, & Trixie Mattel)	Non-album single

== Awards and nominations ==
Year	Award giving body	Category	Work	Results	Ref.
2020	Queerty Awards	Drag Royalty	Herself	Nominated	
2021	Queerty Awards	Lockdown LOL	The Jinkx and DeLa Holiday Special	Won	
2024	Queerty Awards	Live Theater	The Jinkx & DeLa Holiday Show	Won	

== See also ==
- LGBT culture in Seattle
- The Jinkx and DeLa Holiday Show
