= Hermetic Press =

Publishing Company in Seattle, Washington, USA

- Parent company: Penguin Magic
- Status: Defunct
- Founded: 1990; 36 years ago
- Founder: Stephen Minch
- Defunct: 2016; 10 years ago
- Country of origin: United States
- Distribution: National
- Nonfiction topics: Magic and mentalism
- Owner: Penguin Magic
- Official website: hermeticpress.com penguinmagic.com

Hermetic Press was an American publishing company based in Seattle, specializing in technical literature on magic tricks and mentalism. The company specialized in high quality books and often produces limited edition volumes with fine binding.

== History ==
The company was founded in 1990 by Stephen Minch who "after writing books on magic for seventeen years, decided to try publishing them as well."

In addition to the technical publications, the company has also published magic historical and biographical books, including a translation of J. Prevost's "Clever and Pleasant Inventions", from 1584, a biography on Lulu Hearst, the "magnetic girl" who became a star in the 19th century, and the autobiography of Milo & Roger

Among the company's publications are works by Alex Elmsley, Max Maven, Tommy Wonder and Juan Tamariz.

In 2016, Hermetic Press merged with Penguin Magic, which now publishes books under the Hermetic Press imprint.
