= James Claussen =

American painter

- Born: Iowa City, Iowa, US
- Education: Kansas City Art Institute, B.F.A.; University of Washington, M.F.A.
- Occupations: Lithographer, Painter, Professor
- Known for: Lithography, Abstract Painting

James Claussen is a contemporary American lithographer and abstract painter. His lithography is distinguished by the technique of drawing directly on the stone surface as a second drawing process. His paintings combine surrealism with abstraction.

== Biography ==
Born in Iowa City, Iowa, Claussen received a bachelor's in fine arts in painting and printmaking from the Kansas City Art Institute where he was a student of William Wind McKim who was a student of Thomas Hart Benton. Claussen also holds a master's in fine arts in painting and printmaking from the University of Washington School of Art + Art History + Design where he studied with Jacob Lawrence and Glen Alps. Lawrence was Claussen's graduate advisor. Claussen has lectured widely on lithography and is currently a professor at the San Francisco Art Institute and the Academy of Art University in San Francisco. Claussen's lithographs appear as illustrations in books including The Sea Within Us by Lawrence Ferlinghetti and the California Society of Printmakers: One Hundred Years, 1913-2013 and on magazine covers including New Letters: A Magazine of Fine Writing. His work is included in collections of corporations and numerous museums globally. These include the Victoria & Albert Museum in London, the Nelson-Atkins Museum of Art, the Ackland Art Museum, the University of Iowa Stanley Museum of Art, the Smithsonian Institution, Pratt Institute, the University of Wisconsin Chazen Museum of Art, the deCordova Museum in Boston, and the National Museum of Fine Arts in Rio de Janeiro, Brazil. Claussen's shows have included 19 solo exhibitions and 76 group exhibitions. His solo exhibitions include shows at the Peninsula Museum of Art, Cedar Rapids Museum of Art, Albrecht-Kemper Museum of Art, Gary Francis Fine Art in Alameda, California, and the George Krevsky Gallery in San Francisco. Claussen's work is also displayed in the Oakes-Wood House in Iowa City which is the former home of lithographer and painter Grant Wood. Claussen is a former vice president of the California Society of Printmakers.

== Work ==
The Seattle Times calls Claussen's lithographs “great precision of line and texturing and an imagery markedly different from the abstract images of most contemporary printmakers.” According to the Kansas City Star, Claussen operates at “a high level of care and craft.” The Star describes Claussen's work as “gentle surrealism” which means “pictures formed of accumulated and disparate images that seem to float through a field of ether.” New Letters: a Magazine of Fine Writing quotes Claussen as saying “as objective as the realism of drawn objects may seem, their meaning is ruled by the imaginative eye.” Claussen's lithographs have been reproduced in numerous media outlets including San Francisco magazine, San Jose Mercury News, Oakland Tribune, Iowa Press-Citizen, Saint Joseph Gazette and Artslant magazine.
