= Dan Lauria =

American actor

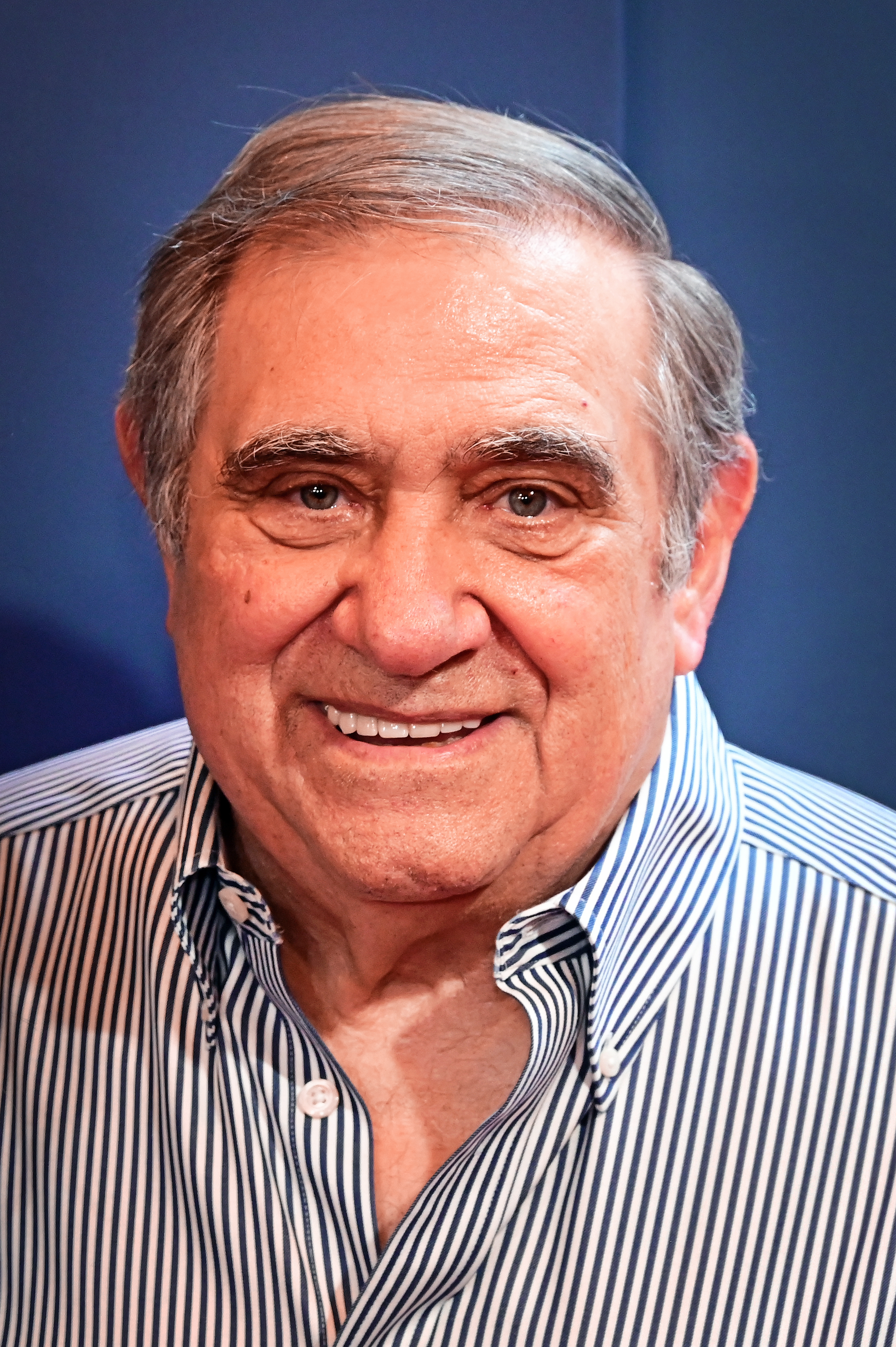
- Lauria in 2026
- Born: Daniel Joseph Lauria; April 12, 1947 (age 79); Brooklyn, New York City, U.S.
- Education: Lindenhurst High School (1965); Southern Connecticut State University (1970)
- Years active: 1962–present
- Spouse: Eileen Cregg (m. 1991; div. 2001)
- Military career
- Branch: United States Marine Corps
- Service years: 1970–1973
- Rank: Captain (O-3)
- Conflicts: Vietnam War

Daniel Joseph Lauria (born April 12, 1947) is an American actor, who played the role of Jack Arnold in The Wonder Years (1988–1993), Jack Sullivan on Sullivan & Son (2012–2014), and Al Luongo on Pitch (2016–2017).

== Early life ==
Born in Brooklyn, New York, Lauria spent his formative years on the South Shore of Long Island, specifically Suffolk County in the village of Lindenhurst; there, he attended Lindenhurst High School, graduating in 1965. He graduated from Southern Connecticut State University in 1970. A Vietnam War veteran, Lauria served as an officer in the United States Marine Corps from 1970–73.

== Career ==
Lauria's early appearances included roles in episodes of Scarecrow and Mrs. King, Hunter, Growing Pains, L.A. Law and Cagney & Lacey, as well as the films Stakeout (1987) and Another Stakeout (1993).

Lauria is best known for his portrayal of Jack Arnold, the stern, but loving, money-conscious father on the TV series The Wonder Years, which ran from 1988 to 1993. He also played Commanding Officer, USA in 1996's Independence Day and NASA Administrator James Webb in the 1998 TV miniseries From the Earth to the Moon. He has also appeared in a 1997 episode of Boy Meets World, starring Ben Savage, the younger brother of Fred Savage, Lauria's on-screen son in The Wonder Years. He appeared as Coach Hamstrung in The Three Stooges N.Y.U.K. on AMC in 2000. More recently he has appeared as Police Commissioner Eustace Dolan in The Spirit (2008).

Lauria appeared on stage in New York in the summer of 2006 in an off-Broadway production of A Stone Carver by William Mastrosimone with Jim Iorio and Elizabeth Rossa. He also had a small role in a season two episode of Army Wives, as well as a season one episode of The Mentalist. In 2009, Lauria has appeared as General Lee Whitworth, M.D. in Criminal Minds season 4. In late 2009, Lauria returned to the off-Broadway stage, appearing as Jimmy Hoffa in Brian Lee Franklin's Good Bobby, a fictionalized account of Robert F. Kennedy's rise.

In 2010, Lauria appeared as Vince Lombardi in the Broadway play Lombardi. The play received positive reviews, with sportswriter Jim Hague commenting, "Lauria truly becomes Vince Lombardi. You almost forget you're watching an actor. He's Lombardi through and through, down to the wire-framed glasses and intimidating scowl." North Bergen football coach Vince Ascolese, who met Lombardi, commented "I really felt like he was Lombardi. It was uncanny." Lauria's portrayal of Lombardi was used during the NFL on FOX introduction to Super Bowl XLV, where one of the two participating teams was the Green Bay Packers; the team Lombardi coached to victories in the first two Super Bowls in 1967 and 1968. The Packers went on to defeat the Pittsburgh Steelers in that game.

In 2012, Lauria played the part of Jean Shepherd in the Broadway production of A Christmas Story: The Musical, a role which he reprised off-Broadway at Madison Square Garden in 2013. From 2012 through 2014, he played Jack Sullivan on the Steve Byrne sitcom Sullivan & Son. From 2016 through 2017, he played Al Luongo on the drama series Pitch. In 2021, Lauria starred as a right-wing conspiracy theorist who marries a Russian mail-order bride in Wes Hurley's autobiographical dramedy Potato Dreams of America. In 2024, he played Tip O'Neill in the Ronald Reagan biopic film Reagan.

Lauria served one year as a Department of Veterans Affairs celebrity hospital visitor, during which he toured many VA hospitals, meeting patients.

== Personal life ==
For a relatively brief period (including at least the spring, summer and fall of 1990), Lauria was involved in the last of three "much publicized failed romances" of Growing Pains star Joanna Kerns (all of which took place during the six years following her 1985 divorce). Notwithstanding a number of notable professional collaborations (culminating in a joint, 1989 post-Christmas guest spot on Good Morning America), (Note: Following late-80s Growing Pains guest spots, Lauria was Kern's onscreen spouse in the 1990 TV-movie The Great Los Angeles Earthquake; moreover, their ongoing stage collaboration formed the basis for a joint Good Morning America appearance on December 27, 1989.) Lauria, as of December 1990, remained unwilling to commit, and—wishing to "avoid a lot of tears"—the pair agreed to a pre-Christmas separation.

Almost exactly one year later, in December 1991, at St. John's Nepomucene Church on East 66th Street in Manhattan, Lauria married Eileen Cregg, a "former employee at a New York City radio station." They remained married at least as late as the summer of 2000, but appear to have gotten divorced—or been in the process of obtaining that divorce—by the beginning of 2001.

== Filmography ==
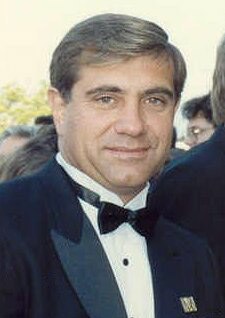
Lauria at the 41st Primetime Emmy Awards on September 17, 1989

=== Film ===
Year	Title	Role	Notes
1981	C.O.D.	Secret Service Man	
1983	Without a Trace	Baker	
1985	South Bronx Heroes	FBI Agent	
1986	9 1/2 Weeks	Janitor	
1987	Stakeout	Phil Coldshank	
1993	Another Stakeout	Phil Coldshank	
1995	Excessive Force II: Force on Force	Orlando Franco	
1996	No One Could Protect Her	Greg Coming	
1996	Independence Day	Commanding Officer	
1998	True Friends	Pauley	
1998	Wide Awake	Father Peters	
1999	Strange in My House	Dennis	
1999	A Wake in Providence	Rudy	
2001	Full Disclosure	Clive Carter	
2001	Ricochet River	Coach Garth	
2002	Contagion	General Ryker	
2002	Outside the Law	Detective Froman	
2002	High Times Potluck	Carmine	
2003	Dead Canaries	Vito Scaldafieri	
2005	The Signs of the Cross	Mr. Coyne	
2005	Jesus, Mary and Joey	Father Gino	
2006	Big Momma's House 2	Crawford	
2008	Dear Me	Mr. Hunt	
2008	The Spirit	Eustace Dolan	
2009	Alien Trespass	Chief Dawson	
2009	Donna on Demand	Detective Lewis	
2009	Dead Air	Fred	
2009	InSearchOf	Reverend Blackwell	
2010	The Waiter	Father Parks	
2011	Here's the Kicker	Dave Berry	
2011	Life of Lemon	Arthur	
2013	Make Your Move	Parole Officer Foster	
2014	Sister	Jeffrey Presser	
2017	The Concessionaires Must Die!	Jack Fisk	
2017	An American Dog Story	Paw Poochini	
2017	Locating Silver Lake	Speaker	
2020	The Eagle and the Albatross	Al Wiserman	
2020	The Way Back	Gerry Norris	
2020	Holidate	Wally	
2021	Potato Dreams of America	John	
2024	Reagan	Tip O'Neill	

=== Television ===
Year	Title	Role	Notes
1982	Muggable Mary, Street Cop	Vince Palucci	Television film
1984	Mickey Spillane's Mike Hammer	John Shane	Episode: "Kill Devil"
1985–1987	Scarecrow and Mrs. King	Rogan, Foster	2 episodes
1986	Hunter	Broder	2 episodes
1986–1987	Growing Pains	Dan, Hockey Coach	2 episodes
1987	L.A. Law	Joseph Sears	Episode: "Prince Kuzak in a Can"
1987	Wiseguy	Jack Phillips	Episode: "A Deal's a Deal"
1987	Sledge Hammer!	Chris Raker	Episode: "A Clockwork Hammer - S2E1"
1987–1988	Cagney & Lacey	Harry Dupnick	4 episodes
1988	David	John	Television film
1988–1993	The Wonder Years	Jack Arnold	Main role
1990	The Great Los Angeles Earthquake	Steve Winslow	Television film
1993	In the Line of Duty: Ambush in Waco	Bob Blanchard	Television film
1995	Amazing Grace	Harry Kramer	5 episodes
1995	Burke's Law	Jimmy Jackson	Episode: "Who Killed Cock-a-Doodle Dooley?"
1996	JAG	Colonel Matt 'Gooch' Anderson	Episode: "Survivors"
1996	Terror in the Family	Todd Marten	Television film
1996–1997	Party of Five	Russ Petrocelli	6 episodes
1997	Boy Meets World	Judge Lamb	Episode: "Wheels"
1997	Prison of Secrets	Ed Crang	Television film
1997	Walker, Texas Ranger	Salvatore Matacio	Episode: "A Father's Image"
1997	Dr. Quinn, Medicine Woman	Samuel Morrison	Episode: "Safe Passage"
1998	From the Earth to the Moon	James Webb	2 episodes
1999	Batman Beyond	Bill Wallace (voice)	Episode: "Earth Mover"
2000	Static Shock	Sean Foley (voice)	Episode: "Sons of the Fathers"
2000	Diagnosis: Murder	Donald Purdy	Episode: "Murder by Remote"
2001	Smallville	Walt Arnold	Episode: "Hothead"
2003	JAG	Allen Blaisdell	4 episodes
2003, 2011	Law & Order: Special Victims Unit	Peter Kurtz, Ray Masters	2 episodes
2003	7th Heaven	Andrew Hampton	Episode: "Life and Death"
2005	Ghost Whisperer	Ellis Conway	Episode: "Voices"
2007	Psych	Bill Peterson	Episode: "Poker? I Barely Know Her"
2007	The Bronx Is Burning	Detective Borelli	Episode: "The Seven Commandments"
2007	The Black Donnellys	Franny Kenny	Episode: "Wasn't That Enough?"
2008	How I Met Your Mother	Nolan	Episode: "Not a Father's Day"
2009	Leverage	Nicky Moscone	Episode: “The Wedding Job”
2009	The Mentalist	Santino Battaglia	Episode: "Red Sauce"
2009	Criminal Minds	Lee Whitworth	Episode: "Amplification"
2010	Law & Order: Criminal Intent	Sal	Episode: "Inhumane Society"
2011	Nurse Jackie	Carl	Episode: "The Astonishing"
2011–2012	Harry's Law	Raymond Gillot	2 episodes
2012	NCIS: Los Angeles	James Cleary	Episode: "The Dragon and the Fairy"
2012–2014	Sullivan & Son	Jack Sullivan	Main role
2013	Person of Interest	Stanley Amis	Episode: "Proteus"
2013	The Good Wife	Ronnie Erickson	Episode: "Outside the Bubble"
2012–2015	Perception	Joe Moretti	5 episodes
2014	Hot in Cleveland	J.J.	3 episodes
2015	Grey's Anatomy	Martin Davis	Episode: "Don't Dream It's Over"
2015, 2019	Blue Bloods	Stan Rourke	2 episodes
2016	Pitch	Al Luongo	10 episodes
2016	Royal Pains	Mr. Sacani	2 episodes
2017	The Night Shift	Doug	Episode: "Keep the Faith"
2017	Elementary	Louis Garmendia	Episode: "High Heat"
2017	NCIS	Morgan Cade	Episode: "Ready or Not"
2018	Christmas at Grand Valley	Frank	Television film
2018	Man with a Plan	Frank	Episode: "Out with the In-Laws"
2018	Shameless	Mo White	3 episodes
2018–2021	This Is Us	Mr. Damon	3 episodes
2019	The Resident	Simon Ortiz	Episode: "Adverse Events"
2021	MacGyver	Lenny Krengel	Episode "Quarantine + N95 + Landline + Telescope + Social Distance"
2021	The Goldbergs	Arnie Wofsy	Episode: "The William Penn Years"
2023	Fantasy Island	Lou Hutchinson	Episode: "War of the Roses (and the Hutchinsons)"
2023	The Good Doctor	Mr. Ermey	Episode: "Loves Labor"

=== Stage ===
Year	Title	Role	Notes
1978	Game Plan	Johnny Ryan	Theatre Four, Off-Broadway
1980	All My Sons	Dr. Jim Bayliss	Veterans Ensemble Theatre Company, Off-Broadway
1980	Marlon Brando Sat Right Here	Nick the Cripple	Boltax Theater, Off-Broadway
1989	Other People's Money	Lawrence Garfinke (Replacement)	Minetta Lane Theatre, Off-Broadway
2002	Hearts	Donald Waldman	Long Wharf Theatre
2004	Ears on a Beetle	Howard Ballantine	DR2 Theater, Off-Broadway
2004	Leading Ladies	Doc Myers	Cleveland Play House
2005	The Winning Streak	Omar	George Street Playhouse
2005	Inspecting Carol	Larry Vauxhall	George Street Playhouse
2006	A Stone Carver	Augustino	Mill Hill Playhouse
2006	A Stone Carver	Augustino	SoHo Playhouse, Off-Broadway
2006	The Value of Names	Leo	George Street Playhouse
2008	The Ones That Flutter	Roddy	The Public Theater, Off-Broadway
2009	Good Bobby	Jimmy Hoffa	59E59 Theater, Off-Broadway
2010	Lombardi	Vince Lombardi	Circle in the Square Theatre, Broadway
2012	A Christmas Story: The Musical	Jean Shepard	Lunt-Fontanne Theatre, Broadway
2014	Dinner With the Boys	Charlie	New Jersey Repertory
2015	Dinner With the Boys	Charlie	Acorn Theatre, Off-Broadway
2017	Love Letters	Andrew Makepeace Ladd III	New Jersey Repertory
2018	The Stone Witch	Simon Grindberg	Westside Theatre, Off-Broadway
2021	Morning's at Seven	Theodore Swanson	Theater at St. Clements, Off-Broadway
2024	Just Another Day	Woman	Theater 555, Off-Broadway
2025	Just Another Day	Woman	Ireland Tour
2025	Just Another Day	Woman	Odyssey Theatre
2025	Just Another Day	Woman	New Jersey Repertory
