= The Architect (2016 film) =

- Directed by: Jonathan Parker
- Written by: Catherine DiNapoli; Jonathan Parker
- Produced by: Catherine DiNapoli; Jonathan Parker; Patrick Peach; Lars Ulrich
- Starring: Parker Posey; Eric McCormack; James Frain
- Cinematography: Svetlana Cvetko
- Edited by: David Scott Smith
- Music by: Niels Bye Nielsen
- Production company: Tarwathie Films
- Release dates: 20 May 2016 (Seattle International Film Festival); 30 September 2017 (US)
- Running time: 95 minutes
- Country: United States
- Language: English

The Architect is a 2016 American comedy-drama film directed by Jonathan Parker, starring Parker Posey, Eric McCormack and James Frain.

== Cast ==
- Parker Posey as Drew
- Eric McCormack as Collin
- James Frain as Miles Moss
- John Carroll Lynch as Conway
- Pamela Reed as Colin's Mother
- John Aylward as Drew's Father
- Dana Milican as Reese
- Alycia Delmore as Caitlin
- Michael Panes as Adjuster

== Reception ==
Larry Williams of the Hartford Courant called the film "entertaining" despite having "plausibility issues".

The Hollywood Reporter called the film a "light riff on bougie aspirations."

Alison Gillmore of the Winnipeg Free Press wrote that while the film "really understands the modern middle-class status anxiety surrounding real estate and renovations", it "remains a tonal mess, not quite sure if it wants to be satire, sitcom or a Lifetime movie-of-the-week."

Ken Eisner of The Georgia Straight wrote that the "sharply written script makes McCormack too much of a materialistic stick-in-the-mud, dampening our investment in the couple’s emotional real estate."
