= Desdemona Chiang =

- Born: 1979 or 1980 (age 44–45); Taipei, Taiwan
- Education: University of California, Berkeley (BA); University of Washington, Seattle (MFA)

Desdemona Chiang is a Taiwan-born American theatre director, and co-artistic director of Azeotrope in Seattle, Washington. Her directing credits include the Guthrie Theater, Alley Theatre, South Coast Repertory, Oregon Shakespeare Festival, Seattle Repertory Theatre, California Shakespeare Theater, Playmakers Repertory Company, and ACT Theatre. She directs in a variety of genres, including Shakespeare, new plays, and musicals.

== Early life ==
Chiang was born in Taipei, Taiwan, and immigrated to California in the United States when she was three years old. She attended the University of California, Berkeley to study pre-medicine. She became interested in the theatre after taking an introduction to acting class, and graduated with a double major in Biology and Theatre. In 2009, she earned a Master of Fine Arts Degree in Theatre Directing at the University of Washington School of Drama.

== Career ==
In 2010, Chiang co-founded Azeotrope with her graduate school colleague Richard Nguyen Sloniker, to create theatre focused on stories about invisible and marginalized people. Their production, Sound by Don Nguyen, was a bilingual show performed in American Sign Language and spoken English, and featured a mixed ensemble of deaf and hearing actors. Chiang co-directed with Seattle-based deaf actor Howie Seago.

Some of Chiang's productions include a re-imagined The Winter's Tale at the Oregon Shakespeare Festival set in Dynastic China and New World America featuring an Asian American and multicultural cast, As You Like It at California Shakespeare Theater where the forest of Arden is transformed into an urban jungle, and a modern-day setting of The Crucible at PlayMakers Repertory Company. She has also directed at numerous regional theatres across America, including the Alley Theatre in Houston, Guthrie Theatre in Minneapolis, and South Coast Repertory in Costa Mesa, CA.

In 2016, Chiang received the Vilcek Foundation's Award for Creative Promise in Theatre.

== Awards and nominations ==
- 2011 and 2020 Drama League TV/Film Fellowships
- 2019 Princess Grace Award - Robert and Gloria Hausman Theater Honor
- 2016 Vilcek Award for Creative Promise in Theatre
- 2016 Gregory Award for Outstanding Direction - Constellations
- 2015 Gregory Award for Outstanding Direction - Measure for Measure
- SDC Sir John Gielgud Fellowship in Classical Theatre
- 2012 Gregory Award for Outstanding Direction - Jesus Hopped the A Train
