= Oakes-Wood House =

Historic house in Iowa, United States

- U.S. National Register of Historic Places
- U.S. Historic district – Contributing property
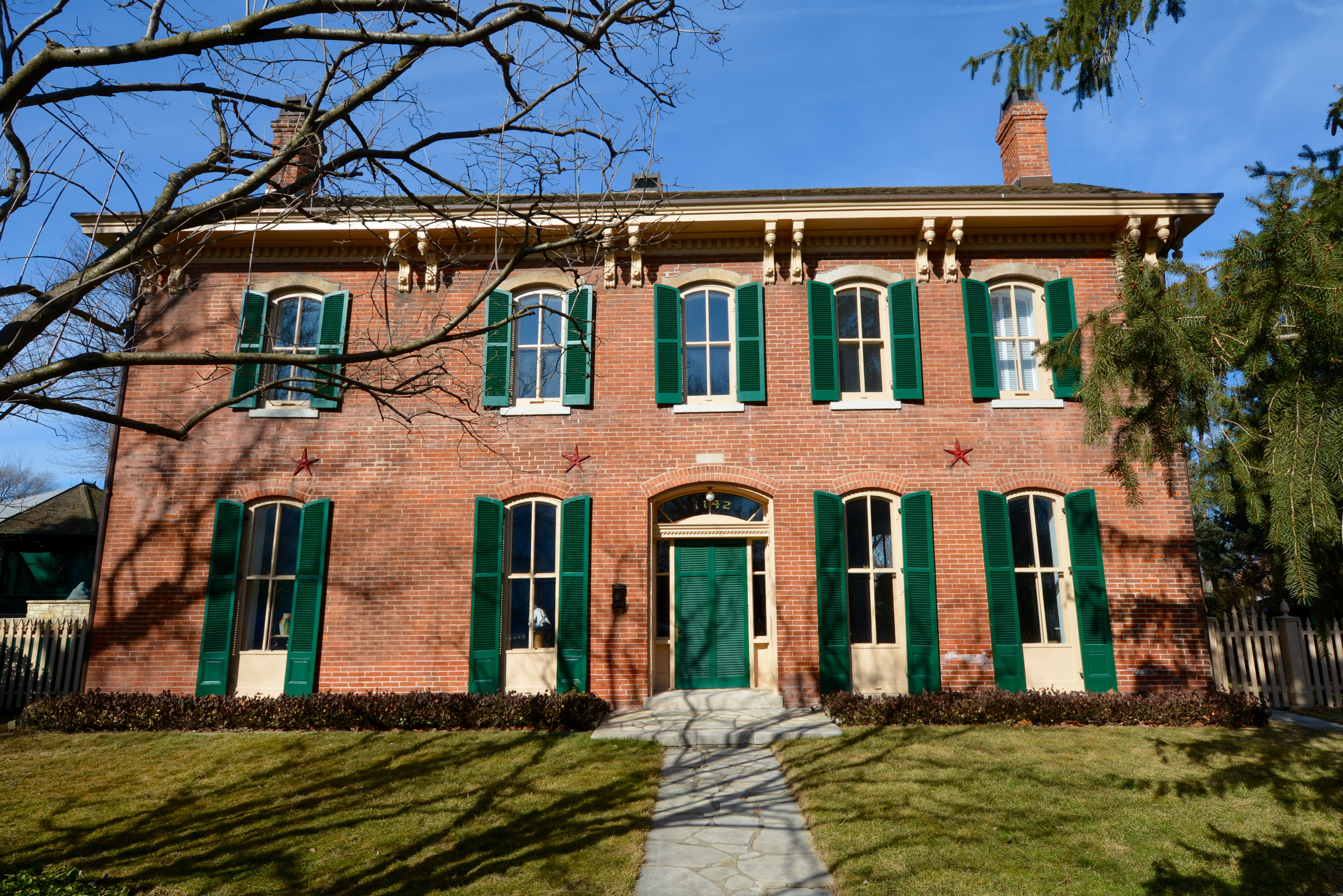

- Location within Iowa Location within the United States
- Location: 1142 E. Court St., Iowa City, Iowa
- Coordinates: 41°39′25.1″N 91°31′05.4″W
- Area: less than one acre
- Built: 1858
- Architectural style: Italianate
- Part of: Longfellow Historic District (ID02001023)
- NRHP reference No.: 78001227
- Added to NRHP: April 14, 1978

The Oakes-Wood House, also known as the Grant Wood House, is a historic building located in Iowa City, Iowa, United States. Nicholas Oakes, who established one of the first brickyards in town, built this house in 1858. The two-story brick Italianate structure features a T-shape floor plan, low gable roof, bracketed eaves, and three brick chimneys.

Its most important association is regionalist artist Grant Wood, who lived here from 1936 and until his death in 1942. He restored the house during his ownership. The paintings he completed here include: Portrait of Nan (1938), Haying (1939), New Road (1939), Parson Weems' Fable–Washington Cherry Tree (1939) and Adolescence (1940). He also experimented with lithography and among the prints he created here include: Seedtime and Harvest, January, and December Afternoon. Also on display is a lithograph by James Claussen who was born in Iowa City. Wood taught painting at the University of Iowa's School of Art while he lived here, and wrote Revolt Against the City in which he stated his beliefs in the value and importance of regionalism in art. The house was individually listed on the National Register of Historic Places in 1978. In 2002 it was included as a contributing property in the Longfellow Historic District.
