= Longfellow Historic District =

Historic district in Iowa, United States

- U.S. National Register of Historic Places
- U.S. Historic district
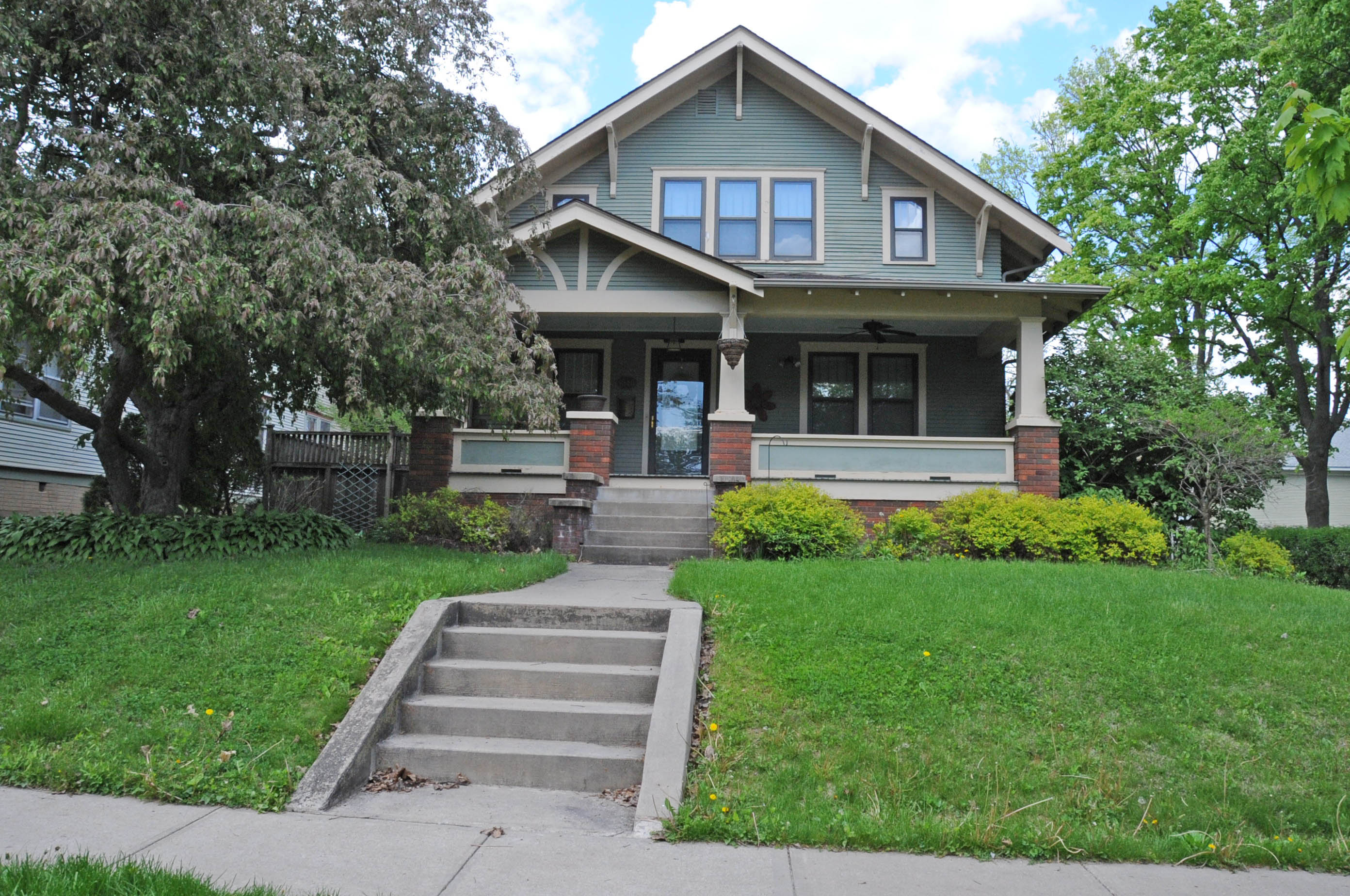

- Location within Iowa Location within the United States
- Location: Roughly bounded by Court, Rundell, Sheridan, and the western boundary of Longfellow School, Iowa City, Iowa
- Coordinates: 41°39′16″N 91°30′59″W
- Area: 63.8 acres (25.8 ha)
- Architect: O.H. Carpenter, et.al.
- Architectural style: Italianate; Queen Anne; American Foursquare; Dutch Colonial; Greek Revival
- MPS: Iowa City MPS
- NRHP reference No.: 02001023
- Added to NRHP: September 12, 2002

The Longfellow Historic District is a nationally recognized historic district located in Iowa City, Iowa, United States. It was listed on the National Register of Historic Places in 2002. At the time of its nomination, it consisted of 355 resources, which included 250 contributing buildings, 103 non-contributing buildings, and two non-contributing structures. As the University of Iowa expanded in the early 20th-century new sections were being added to the city. The Longfellow neighborhood, named after the local elementary school completed in 1919, was part of this expansion. The northern part of the neighborhood along East Court Street developed in the 19th century because the street connected the city center to the Muscatine road. The rest of the neighborhood was platted on farm land in 1908 and 1914. A trolley line was completed to the area in 1910, leading to the creation of suburban development.

Most of the houses in the neighborhood were completed between 1910 and 1940. The structures are small to medium-sized and reflect the styles that were popular at the time, particularly the American Craftsman. Two architect designed buildings were works of two architects that are not well known: O.H. Carpenter for the E.T. Davis house on Court Street, and G.L. Lockart for Longfellow School. The Oakes-Wood House (1858), one of the older houses in the neighborhood that was owned by artist Grant Wood, was individually listed on the National Register of Historic Places.
