= Potato Dreams of America =

2021 film by Wes Hurley

- Theatrical release poster
- Directed by: Wes Hurley
- Written by: Wes Hurley
- Starring: Hersh Powers; Tyler Bocock; Sera Barbieri; Marya Sea Kaminski; Dan Lauria; Lea DeLaria; Jonathan Bennett; Lady Rizo
- Cinematography: Vincent Pierce
- Edited by: Wes Hurley
- Music by: Catherine Joy; Joshua Kohl
- Distributed by: Dark Star Pictures
- Release dates: March 16, 2021 (SXSW); January 14, 2022 (United States)
- Running time: 97 minutes
- Country: United States
- Language: English

Potato Dreams of America is a 2021 American autobiographical coming-of-age comedy-drama film written and directed by Wes Hurley.

== Plot ==
After leaving her abusive alcoholic husband, Lena lives in Vladivostok, Soviet Union, with her young son, nicknamed Potato. The boy often escapes into fantastical reality of his own imaginary film – for example, picturing his parents doing an acrobatic Apache dance when they are actually fighting.

At school, Potato finds himself rebelling against waning communist ideology, where a living portrait of Vladimir Lenin literally watches the kids as they take a class photo. Lena works as a doctor in prison, facing death threats from her corrupt supervisor who wants her to certify suspicious prisoner deaths as accidents. After a renegade TV channel starts showing pirated American movies, Lena and Potato fall in love with and escape into Hollywood's happy endings.

Meanwhile, Potato meets Jesus Christ at his Sunday school and brings his new imaginary friend home. One day Lena discovers an ad for applying to a mail-order bride catalogue and decides to try it out. Terrorized by bullies at school, Potato starts to suspect that he's gay but even Jesus can not help him there. Constantly being put down by Tamara - Lena's chronically discouraging mother - Potato and Lena dream of coming to America. Their prayers are answered when an older Seattle man, John, replies to Lena's ad and decides to bring them to the US.

Lena and Potato are thrilled to arrive to Seattle, but they soon find out that John is a right-wing religious fundamentalist and a conspiracy theorist. The mother and son have to tread gently around him while negotiating their new immigrant lives. Potato tries to fit in at school while Lena gets a job working at a Mexican food restaurant. When Potato comes out to his mother, Lena is supportive but warns him not to tell John - as he would throw them out and send them back to Russia. Their lives are turned upside down when John discovers that Potato has been renting Gregg Araki's The Living End from the local video store.

== Cast ==
- Hersh Powers - Russian Potato
- Tyler Bocock - American Potato
- Sera Barbieri - Russian Lena
- Marya Sea Kaminski - American Lena
- Jonathan Bennett - Jesus
- Dan Lauria - John
- Lea DeLaria - Tamara
- Lady Rizo - Virgin Mary
- Lauren Tewes - Nina Ivanovna

== Structure & Themes ==
Potato Dreams of American is split into two very different narrative and visual styles as it portrays Russia and the US. The USSR/Russia is filmed on highly stylized theatrical sets and is full of moments of magic realism. The characters speak English without a Russian accent. Hurley compared the intended effect to American productions of Chekhov's plays which do not employ Russian accent as it would be distracting.

The US half of the film is shot with a more realistic approach, while the two leads speak English with a thick Russian accent. Hurley stated that the perception and context of language was a very important element of the film leading to this unusual structure of the film. Hurley added that the feeling of child-like vulnerability experienced by immigrants barely speaking their new language play a major role in how they are perceived by the audience. This contrasts with the same characters living in their native country where language is not a consideration.

The choice to imbue Russian scenes with magic realism and heightened theatricality had both practical and creative reasons. Potato Dreams of America was made on a micro-budget, making it impossible to create large realistic sets of 1980s Russia. Hurley also stated that magic realism helps shape the narrative in a way that a child would remember it. The world of 1990's Seattle on the other hand was influenced by happy endings of early 1990s American comedies that Potato and his mother watched in Russia.

Catherine Joy scored the American half of the film, while Joshua Kohl scored the Russian half - reinforcing the separateness of the two worlds. For the Russian scenes Hurley credited the works of Derek Jarman, Rainer Werner Fassbinder and especially Mishima: A Life in Four Chapters (1985) as inspiration.

== Development ==
Hurley stated that the film is very closely based on true events and that he first wrote the script in 2013 following the controversy about holding Olympic Games in Sochi. Hurley's muse for the script was long-time friend and collaborator, Marya Sea Kaminski, who would play Lena. The feature builds on his short doc Little Potato which covers the same story but in 15 minutes and the VR piece Potato Dreams which only covers the Russian part of Lena and Potato's story.

All three films screened at South by Southwest, with Little Potato winning the Oscar-qualifying Jury Prize in 2016 and landing at The Atlantic and The Criterion Channel. Several elements of magic realism are shared by the feature and the VR short, including Potato's parents’ Apache dance and Vladimir Lenin represented as a malevolent living entity. Hurley and producer Mischa Jakupcak began pre-production on the feature shortly after receiving Creative Capital award for the project.

== Reception ==
The film premiered at South by Southwest in 2021 where it was nominated for Grand Jury Prize and subsequently had its European premiere at Deauville American Film Festival where it was nominated for Special Grand Prize along with Sean Baker's Red Rocket and Pig. The film won several audience and jury awards at festivals around the world including Outstanding Screenplay at Outfest and Best Supporting Performance for Lea DeLaria at Tallgrass Film Festival.

Cult filmmaker John Waters praised the film's performances and comedic timing after attending its screening at Provincetown International Film Festival. Following its limited theatrical run, the film was positively received by critics and audiences, certified Fresh by Rotten Tomatoes with 91% approval from critics and 85% approval by audiences on the site.

Salon named Potato Dreams of America one of "9 of the Best Movies About American Immigrants" along with Everything Everywhere All At Once, Brooklyn and Scarface. The Bay Area Reporter wrote: "Hurley harvests his storytelling skills, resulting in a bumper crop of emotions, with laughter and tears in equal measure." While Variety stated that: "The very existence of Potato Dreams of America is its own happy ending: It’s a calling card, at least, that prompts curiosity over what stories, or whose stories, Hurley will tell next."

Special edition DVD and Blu-Ray were released by the film's US distributor Dark Star, featuring an essay by Guinevere Turner and director's commentary by Hurley.

== Film References ==
While exploring the impact cinema has on its main characters Potato Dreams of America references many American films. The first American film aired by the renegade channel 3 is Working Girl. Later Potato has a sexual awakening during the Bolo Yeung and Jean-Claude Van Damme fight from Kickboxer. Potato's friend recounts watching Total Recall, prompting Potato to make up a non-existent sequel to Star Wars. When getting a makeover from her girlfriends, Lena listens to one of them retell the plot of Pretty Woman. In the States, Potato is obsessed with Gregg Araki's The Living End, while it's mentioned that John loves Taxi Driver.
