= University of Washington College of Arts and Sciences =

College at the University of Washington

Coordinates: 47°39′14″N 122°18′28″W

College of Arts and Sciences
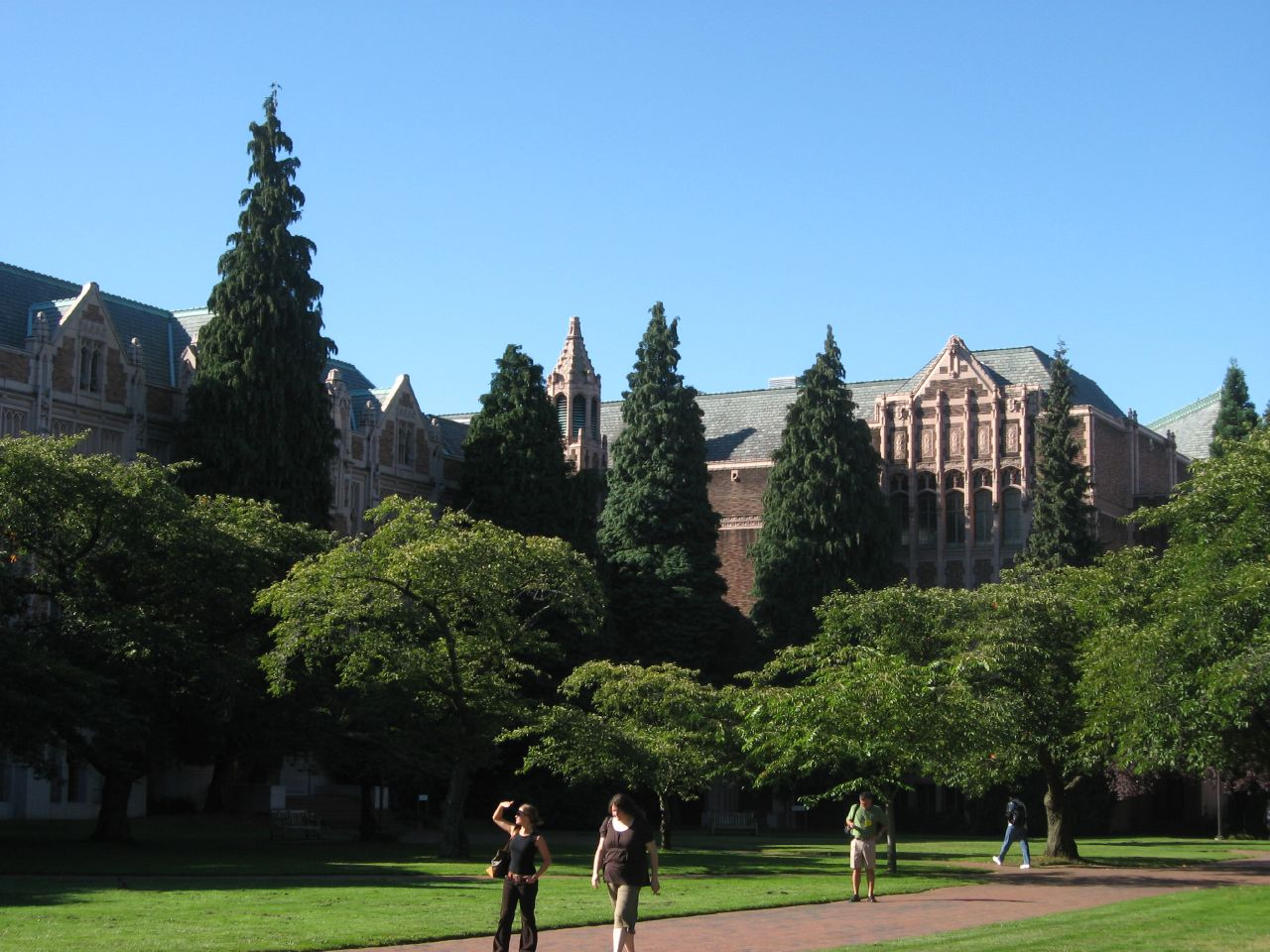
- Liberal Arts Quadrangle
- Type: Public
- Established: 1861; 165 years ago
- Parent institution: University of Washington
- Dean: Dianne Harris
- Academic staff: 925 FTE
- Students: 21,913
- Location: Seattle, Washington, U.S.
- Website: artsci.washington.edu

The College of Arts and Sciences (CAS) is the arts and sciences college of the University of Washington. It is organized into four academic divisions: Arts, Humanities, Natural Sciences, and Social Sciences. Each division includes various academic departments. There are four department-level schools at the College: the School of Art + Art History + Design, the School of Drama, the School of Music, and the Jackson School of International Studies.

In autumn 2022, the College of Arts and Sciences offered more than 5,400 courses and had an enrollment of 21,913 students, making it the largest college of the University of Washington.

== History ==
The College of Arts and Sciences is considered to have been established in 1861, when the University of Washington itself was founded. However, the College was technically incorporated when the Territorial Legislature enacted "An Act to Incorporate the University to the Territory of Washington". Section 9 of the Act stipulated that the university have four departments: literature, science and the arts; law; medicine; and a military department. However, only literature, science, and music were available according to territorial newspaper advertisements announcing the opening of the university placed by Daniel Bagley in September 1861.

== Organization ==
=== Arts Division ===
The Arts Division includes all of the university's arts units. It includes two academic departments and three department-level schools:

- School of Art + Art History + Design
- Department of Dance
- Department of Digital Arts and Experimental Media
- School of Drama
- School of Music

It includes the following institutes:

- Henry Art Gallery
- Burke Museum of Natural History and Culture
- Meany Center for the Performing Arts

=== Humanities Division ===
The Humanities Division includes the following academic departments:

- Department of Asian Languages and Literature
- Department of Cinema and Media Studies
- Department of Classics
- Department of Comparative History of Ideas
- Department of English
- Department of French and Italian Studies
- Department of German Studies
- Department of Linguistics
- Department of Middle Eastern Languages and Cultures
- Department of Scandinavian Studies
- Department of Slavic Languages and Literatures
- Department of Spanish and Portuguese Studies

=== Natural Sciences Division ===
The Natural Sciences Division includes the following academic departments:

- Department of Applied Mathematics
- Department of Astronomy
- Department of Biology
- Department of Chemistry
- Department of Mathematics
- Department of Physics
- Department of Psychology
- Department of Speech and Hearing Sciences
- Department of Statistics

=== Social Sciences Division ===
The Social Sciences Division includes the following academic departments:

- Department of American Ethnic Studies
- Department of American Indian Studies
- Department of Anthropology
- Department of Communication
- Department of Economics
- Department of Gender, Women and Sexuality Studies
- Department of Geography
- Department of History
- Jackson School of International Studies
- Department of Law, Societies, and Justice
- Department of Philosophy
- Department of Political Science
- Department of Sociology

== Centers and institutes ==
The College contains more than 30 centers and institutes, including the Center for Labor Studies, Institute for Learning and Brain Sciences, Institute for Nuclear Theory, and Simpson Center for the Humanities.

== See also ==
- College of arts and sciences
