= Capitol Hill (TV series) =

American web series

- Genre: Comedy-horror
- Created by: Wes Hurley
- Starring: BenDeLaCreme; Waxie Moon; Jinkx Monsoon; Colby Keller; Jonathan Crimeni
- Country of origin: United States
- Original language: English
- No. of seasons: 2

Production
- Executive producer: Wes Hurley
- Production locations: Seattle, Washington
- Running time: 6-8 minutes

Original release
- Network: HuffPost
- Release: March 3, 2014 – July 9, 2015

Capitol Hill is a comedy-horror soap opera web series, which premiered on HuffPost in 2014. The series was created, written, directed and produced by Wes Hurley. The show is named after Seattle's historic Capitol Hill neighborhood.

Both inspired by and parodying TV shows of the 1970s and 1980s such as Murder, She Wrote, Dynasty, and Charlie's Angels, the series focuses on young and innocent Roses Smell (Waxie Moon) who escapes from Portland, and finds romance and stardom as a TV personality in Seattle. Capitol Hill is both a dark comedy and a queer deconstruction of narrative cliches and traditional gender norms. Other influences cited by Hurley include anime, Giallo and Twin Peaks.

== Cast ==
=== Main ===
- Waxie Moon as Roses Smell
- Robbie Turner as Dottie Pearl
- BenDeLaCreme as herself
- Jinkx Monsoon as Celeste Dahl
- Alexandra Tavares as Tanya
- Jonathan Crimeni as Mayor
- Colby Keller as himself
- Mark Siano as George

=== Recurring ===
- Guinevere Turner as therapist
- Annette Toutonghi as Mother Terisha
- Charles Leggett as Holy Godfather
- Jason Carter as Father Dick
- Aleksa Manila as Helena Pen Poison
- Miss Indigo Blue as Poops Smell
- Zoe Scofield as Demon
- Sarah Rudinoff as Anna Zhopova
- Jennifer Jasper as Sister Malvina
- Jackie Hell as Dinky Pie

== Season One ==
In the first season, Roses runs away from Portland, which in the show is portrayed as a Deep South community populated by inbred cannibals and illiterate rednecks. Upon her arrival in Seattle, Roses instantly makes a new best friend - Tanya (Alexandra Tavares) - who takes her in and finds her a job on a local TV news station. When the resident queen bee Dottie Pearl (played by Robbie Turner) falls ill, Roses has an opportunity to host Pearl's news segment. The TV station's sleazy owner, George Hall (Mark Siano), is so impressed with Roses' performance that he gives her a new talk show called "Women in the Workplace". While hosting one of the episodes of "Women in the Workplace", Roses befriends the world's most popular and controversial nun, Mother Terisha. Mother Terisha recruits Roses to go undercover to a gay bar to spy on gay activists who are ruining her reputation. But instead of aiding Mother Terisha, Roses, disguised as a gay man, falls in love with a handsome bartender, Michelle. After meeting Helena Pen Poison, the world's most famous forensic scientist and mystery writer, Roses agrees to help the investigation against Mother Terisha, with grave consequences. Meanwhile, Dottie Pearl gets possessed by a demonic being who uses Dottie to get closer to Roses. Each episode is introduced by BenDeLaCreme.

This season was presented as a series of 10 episodes. Subsequently, the series played at many film festivals including Geneva International Film Festival Tous Ecrans, Raindance, Seattle Lesbian & Gay Film Festival, Mix Brasil Festival and Oslo/Fusion.

The first season was nominated for Best Comedy Series, Best Makeup, Best Production Design, Best Cinematography and earned Harmony Arnold the Best Costumes award at the Indie Series Awards. The first season was also nominated for Best Series at Geneva International Film Festival Tous Ecrans and Best Production Design at the Miami Webfest.

== Season Two ==
Season 2 trailer starring Kenneth "Kenny" Brain of Big Brother, Waxie Moon and Baby Bear premiered in August 2015 on Out and WorldofWonder.com. Season 2 premiered in October 2015 with Jinkx Monsoon, Colby Keller, Jason Carter, Jackie Hell, Sarah Rudinoff and Guinevere Turner joining the cast.
