= Waxie Moon in Fallen Jewel =

- Directed by: Wes Hurley
- Written by: Wes Hurley; Marc Kenison
- Produced by: Wes Hurley; Harmony Arnold; Jennifer Zeyl; Marc Kenison
- Starring: Waxie Moon; Sarah Rudinoff; Marya Sea Kaminski; El Vez; John Osebold; Inga Ingenue; Erin Emlyn Badenhop; Jackie Hell
- Cinematography: Wes Hurley
- Edited by: Wes Hurley
- Music by: Eric Lane Barnes; Jerry Peerson; The Little Penguins; Jeremiah Oliver; Sarah Rudinoff
- Production company: I Ate My Eyes Films
- Release date: 2011
- Running time: 70 minutes
- Country: United States
- Language: English

Waxie Moon in Fallen Jewel is a 2011 pop-art musical comedy from cult filmmaker Wes Hurley. It stars the renowned performance artist Marc Kenison as his gender-bending burlesque personae Waxie Moon, as well as The Stranger Genius-award winners Sarah Rudinoff, Marya Sea Kaminski and John Osebold, Nick Garrison, Keira McDonald, Sage Price, Brandon Petty, Erin Emlyn Badenhop, Inga Ingenue, Lou Henry Hoover, with memorable cameos by Jinkx Monsoon, Lynn Shelton and Jackie Hell, among others. The film also features an original soundtrack with music by Campfire OK, Jose Bold, Gretta Harley, We Are Golden, the Little Penguins and Brendan Patrick Hogan. Two songs were arranged and recorded exclusively for the film by Eric Lane Barnes — his original composition "Everything is on Fire" performed by Sarah Rudinoff and a techno version of "Cold Song" performed by Nick Garrison. Wade Madsen, Anna Allen, Inga Ingenue and Waxie Moon choreographed the film's many dance sequences. Several hundred looks were created for over 200 performers by the costume and makeup designer Harmony Arnold. The Genius-award winner Jennifer Zeyl served as the art director for the film.

Although primarily a comedy, Waxie Moon in Fallen Jewel experiments with narrative structure by switching genres to mirror Waxie's social standing and emotional state, and in the process eschews Hollywood's traditional treatment of its female protagonists. Other experimental elements in the film include the generous use of Bertolt Brecht's alienation effect and its highly stylized movement and blocking, which often references choreographers such as Martha Graham.

== Release ==
The film premiered in Tel Aviv and went on to screen in Scotland and Japan. After its initial premiere in Seattle, Waxie Moon in Fallen Jewel became a local cult favorite. In Seattle the film continues to screen monthly in the tradition of The Rocky Horror Picture Show with live performances and hosts such as Jinkx Monsoon, Jett Adore, BenDeLaCreme and Sarah Rudinoff. Many of these screenings benefit local charities.

In 2015 the film was released on DVD and streaming video by Ariztical Entertainment under the title Fallen Jewel. The DVD release features an introduction by Jinkx Monsoon.
