= Waxie Moon (film) =

- Directed by: Wes Hurley
- Written by: Wes Hurley
- Produced by: Wes Hurley
- Starring: Waxie Moon; Miss Dirty Martini; Miss Indigo Blue; Paula the Swedish Housewife; BenDeLaCreme
- Cinematography: Wes Hurley
- Edited by: Wes Hurley
- Music by: Eric Lane Barnes; Jerry Peerson; The Little Penguins; Jeremiah Oliver; Sarah Rudinoff
- Production company: I Ate My Eyes Films
- Release date: 2015
- Running time: 70 minutes
- Country: United States
- Language: English

Waxie Moon is a documentary directed by Wes Hurley and centered on the gender-bending Juilliard-trained burlesque performer, Waxie Moon. The film captures the burgeoning and mostly-queer neo-burlesque community in Seattle in the 2000s. It features interviews with dozens of performers and artists, including the burlesque icons Miss Dirty Martini and Tigger!, author and performer Marya Sea Kaminski, drag superstar BenDeLaCreme, and many others. The film also includes the original song, titled "Waxie Moon", which was inspired by James Bond scores. The song was composed by Eric Lane Barnes of the Seattle Men's Chorus and Seattle Women's Chorus, and performed by Sarah Rudinoff and Paul Rosenberg.

Waxie Moon premiered in Austin, Texas, and went on to screen at the Anthology Film Archives, Echo Park Film Center, and at many festivals around the world, including a dozen screenings in Seattle. The film won Best Local Film at the Seattle Lesbian & Gay Film Festival, Jury Award for Best Film at Queer Fruits Film Festival in Australia, and Best Film, Best Director, Best Cinematography, Best Editing and Best Soundtrack at Love Unlimited Film Festival. It is available on video from TLAvideo.
