= What the Funny =

American comedy digital media company

- Company type: Private
- Industry: Internet, digital media
- Genre: Comedy
- Founders: Marlon Wayans; Randy Adams; Peter D. Coleman
- Headquarters: Hollywood, California, United States
- Website: whatthefunny.com

What The Funny was an urban comedy digital media company founded by comedian Marlon Wayans and Funny or Die co-founder Randy Adams, and industry veteran Peter D. Coleman. The studio was located on the lot at Sunset Gower Studios.

The site had partnerships with former American Idol contestant and YouTube star Todrick Hall and Houston rapper Trae tha Truth.
