= Asi Wind =

Israeli magician

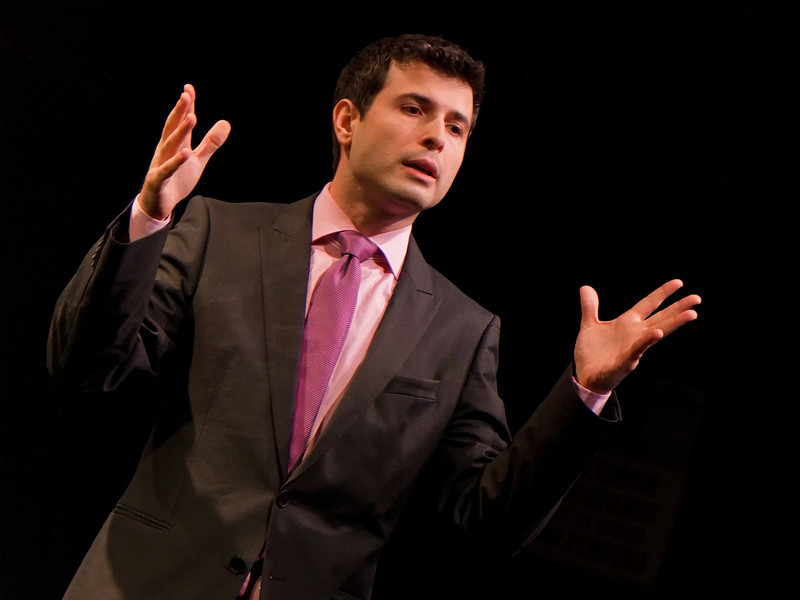
Asi Wind at IBM

Asi Wind is an Israeli-American magician.

== Early life ==
Asi Wind was born in Holon, Israel. At birth he was named Asi Betesh, however, he disliked his last name and its connections to his heritage, and now goes by Asi Wind - taken from the Israeli photographer Noam Wind. Both of Asi's parents were Jewish, his father being descended from Syria, and his mother being descended from Iraq. He first discovered magic because of his uncle, but he didn't learn his first trick until he was 13. When he was 13, he went to a magic shop in Tel Aviv, and to learn his first trick, he spent 50 shekels. In 2001, Asi moved to New York after visiting his brother in New York City.

== Magic career ==
In 2022, Asi Wind had the show "Inner Circle" at Judson Theater. In 2024, Asi Wind had a six-month long run of his show "Incredibly Human" in London's West End at the Underbelly Boulevard. Currently, Wind is doing a tour through the USA and Australia with his new show "More than Magic". He also works as a consultant for magicians, including the magician David Blaine.

Asi has also published 6 magic books: Second Wind, Repertoire II, Repertoire, Magic Between Friends, Before we Begin, and Inner Circle Program, including a French version of Repertoire.
