= Magic store =

Establishment selling materials for performing magic tricks

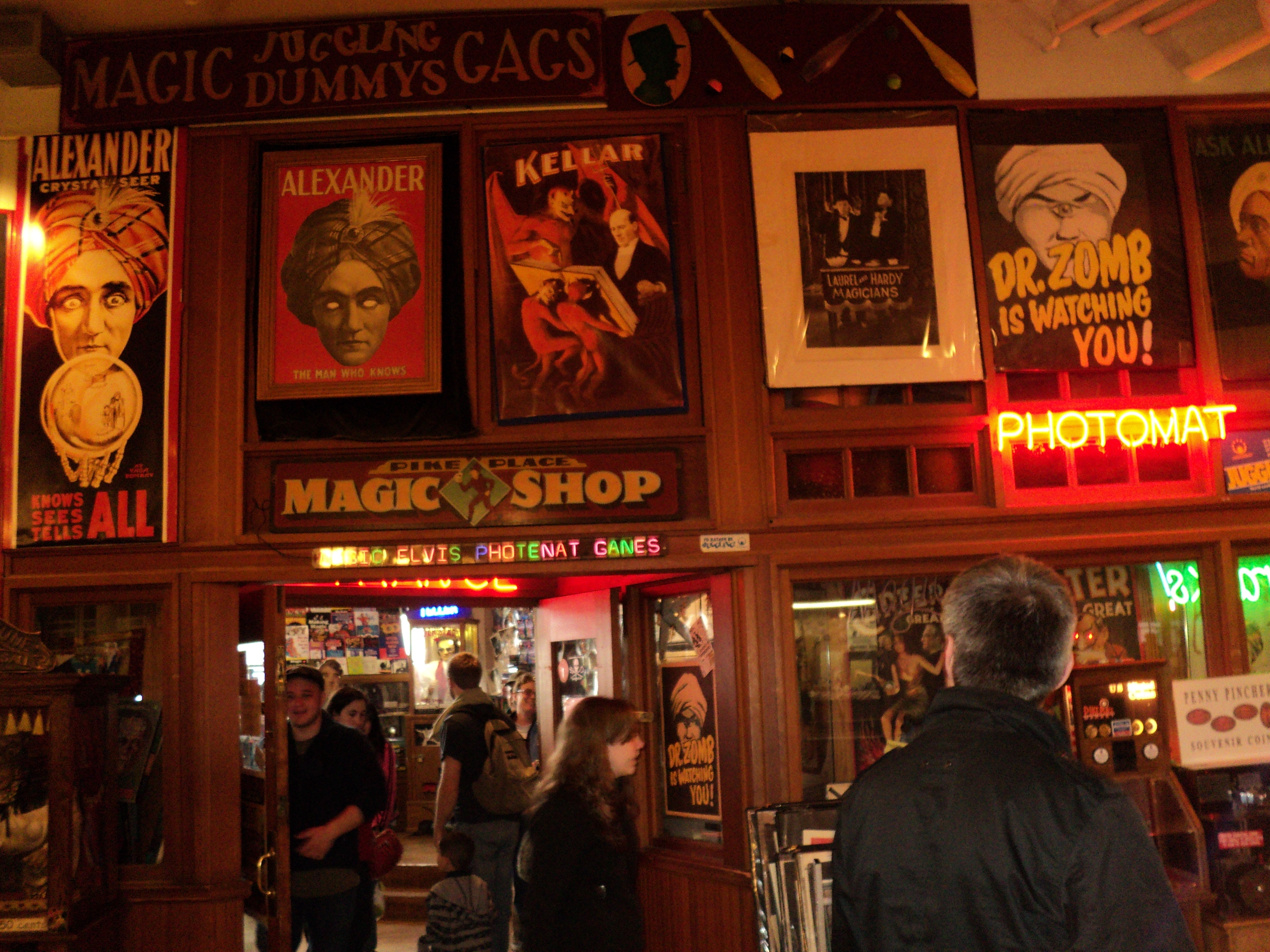
A magic shop in Seattle, displaying posters of famous magicians and also advertising "gags"

A magic store (also magic shop or magician's supply shop) is an establishment which sells materials for performing magic tricks. Magic shops often also sell practical jokes and novelty items, and frequently serve as informal gathering places for amateur magicians, with some hosting organized magic clubs.
