= Waxie Moon (performer) =

Transexual performer

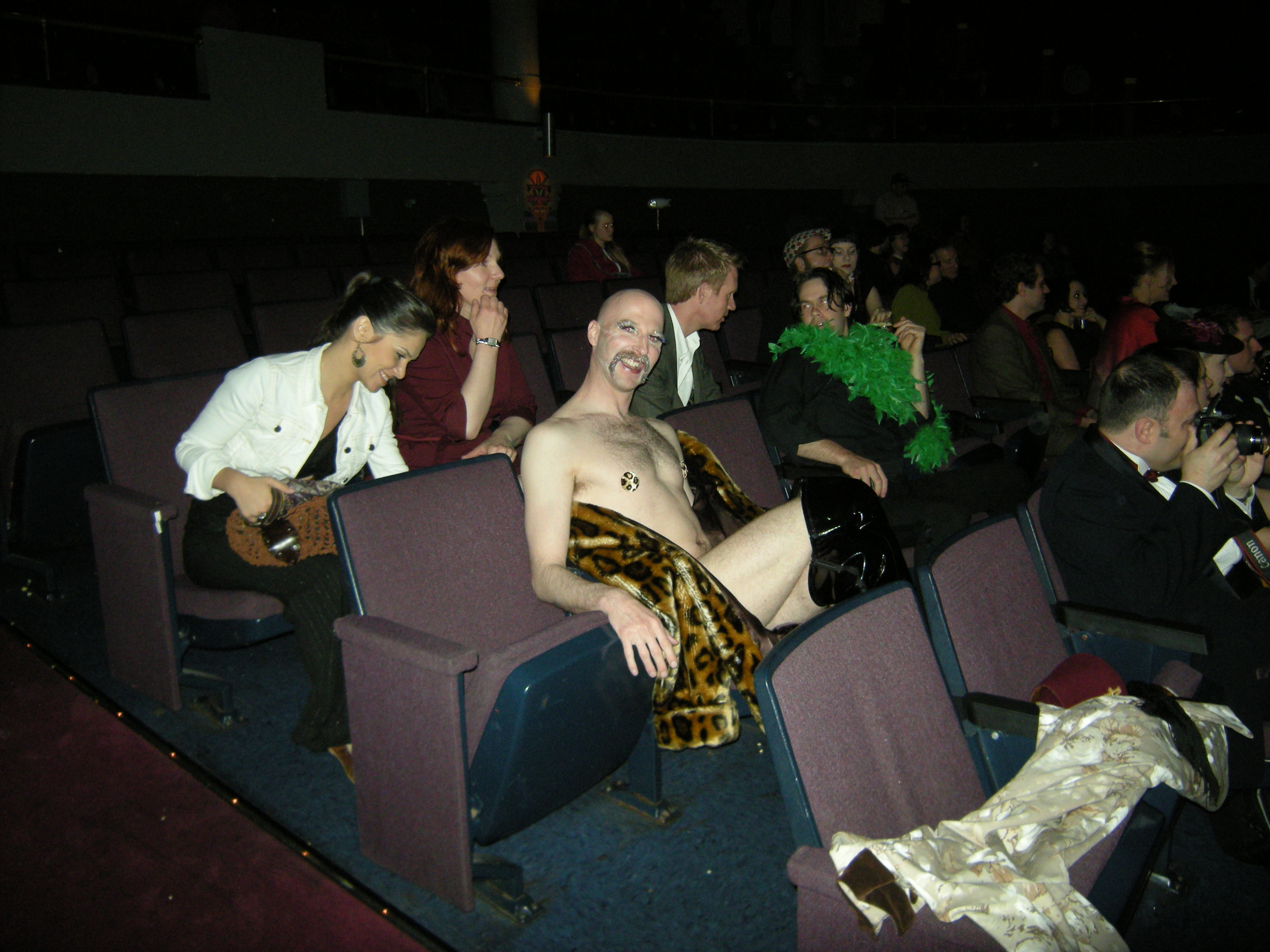
Waxie Moon in the audience at the premiere of the documentary A Wink and a Smile at the Egyptian Theater, Seattle, Washington, USA, as part of the 2008 Seattle International Film Festival

Waxie Moon is a gender-bending neo-burlesque persona of the performer Marc Kenison. Kenison studied modern dance at Juilliard School and acting at University of Washington. During his six years dancing for the José Limón Company, Kenison performed for the White House and toured other parts of the world, including the war-torn Sarajevo and El Salvador. After co-founding the Washington Ensemble Theater in Seattle, Kenison turned to burlesque and created Waxie Moon, whom he describes as "the gender-blending queer lady boylesque performance art solo stripping sensation".

In 2009 Waxie Moon became the subject of Wes Hurley's documentary of the same name. The documentary Waxie Moon won several awards including Best Local Film at the Seattle Gay and Lesbian Film Festival, Jury Award at Queer Fruits Festival in Australia and Best Film at Love Unlimited Film Festival. The film is distributed by TLA Video. Waxie Moon is also the star and co-writer of Waxie Moon in Fallen Jewel, a cult comedy directed by Wes Hurley and was featured in A Wink and a Smile by Deirdre Timmons.

In 2009 Waxie Moon, Lou Henry Hoover and Inga Ingenue co-founded the dance troupe "Dance Belt" which has been voted the Sexiest Dance Troupe by The Stranger.

In 2014, artist Anna-Lisa Notter unveiled a large mural of Waxie Moon above Seattle's iconic Pike Place Market.

Waxie Moon is the star of Wes Hurley's acclaimed comedy series Capitol Hill which premiered in 2014 on Huffington Post and is distributed in Europe by OutTV.
