= Sarah Rudinoff =

American actress, singer, and writer (born 1971)

- Born: August 26, 1971 (age 55); Alexandria, Virginia, U.S.
- Education: Pitzer College
- Occupations: Actress, singer, writer, real estate agent
- Notable work: Hedwig and the Angry Inch, These Streets, Wonderful Town, On the Town
- Awards: Genius Award (2004)

Sarah Rudinoff (born August 26, 1971) is an American actress, singer, and writer. She was the recipient of a 2004 Genius Award from the Seattle, Washington alternative weekly newspaper The Stranger.

== Life and career ==
Born in Alexandria, Virginia, and raised on the island of Kauai, Rudinoff, a self-described "half-Episcopalian, half-Jew" has lived and worked in a number of North American cities. She has appeared in Negative Space and Richard Foreman's Ontological Hysteric in New York City and in several new plays at the Mark Taper Forum in Los Angeles; as of 2006 she is based in Seattle. Described by David-Edward Hughes of Talkin' Broadway, as "a big-boned, whiskey voiced stunner", she has appeared in many of Seattle's professional theatres including starring as Ruth in "Wonderful Town" and Hildy in "On the Town" at the 5th Avenue Theatre. Rudinoff is probably best known to rock audiences for her turn as Yitzhak in the original Seattle production Hedwig and the Angry Inch and her solo shows Broad Perspective (1998), Go There (2003) or The Last State (2004), a piece about growing up haole in Hawaii.

In presenting her the Genius Award, Sean Nelson of The Stranger wrote that she "is one of maybe 10 performers in town who have achieved the distinction of local stardom in non-rock-band live performance. She sings like a demon, equally comfortable belting rock, jazz, or blues... Rudinoff is not the kind of actress who 'disappears' into the roles she plays. She's the kind of actress who explodes out of her roles with heroic, instinctive, and fearless performances." The rival Seattle Weekly named her "Best Woman in Man's Clothing" for her title role in Ubu, Ki Gottberg’s reworking of Alfred Jarry's Ubu plays.

As a musician and singer Rudinoff makes music with We Are Golden and in 2010 she was included in photography book chronicling 100 Seattlites that make a difference to culture in the city – A Seattle 100.

Rudinoff is a star of Wes Hurley's musical comedy Waxie Moon in Fallen Jewel in which she plays two roles and performs the musical number "Everything is On Fire". Rudinoff also sang the title song composed by Eric Lane Barnes for the documentary Waxie Moon also directed by Hurley.

In 2013 Sarah Rudinoff and Gretta Harley premiered their original play, These Streets based on real-life stories of female rockers during the Grunge era of Seattle's music scene. As part of their research for the play Rudinoff, Harley and filmmaker Wes Hurley conducted dozens of video interviews of female musicians of the era, including Vanessa Veselka and Carla Torgerson of The Walkabouts.

Rudinoff is a graduate of Iolani School and Pitzer College. She works as a real estate agent.
