= Wes Hurley =

Russian-American writer and filmmaker

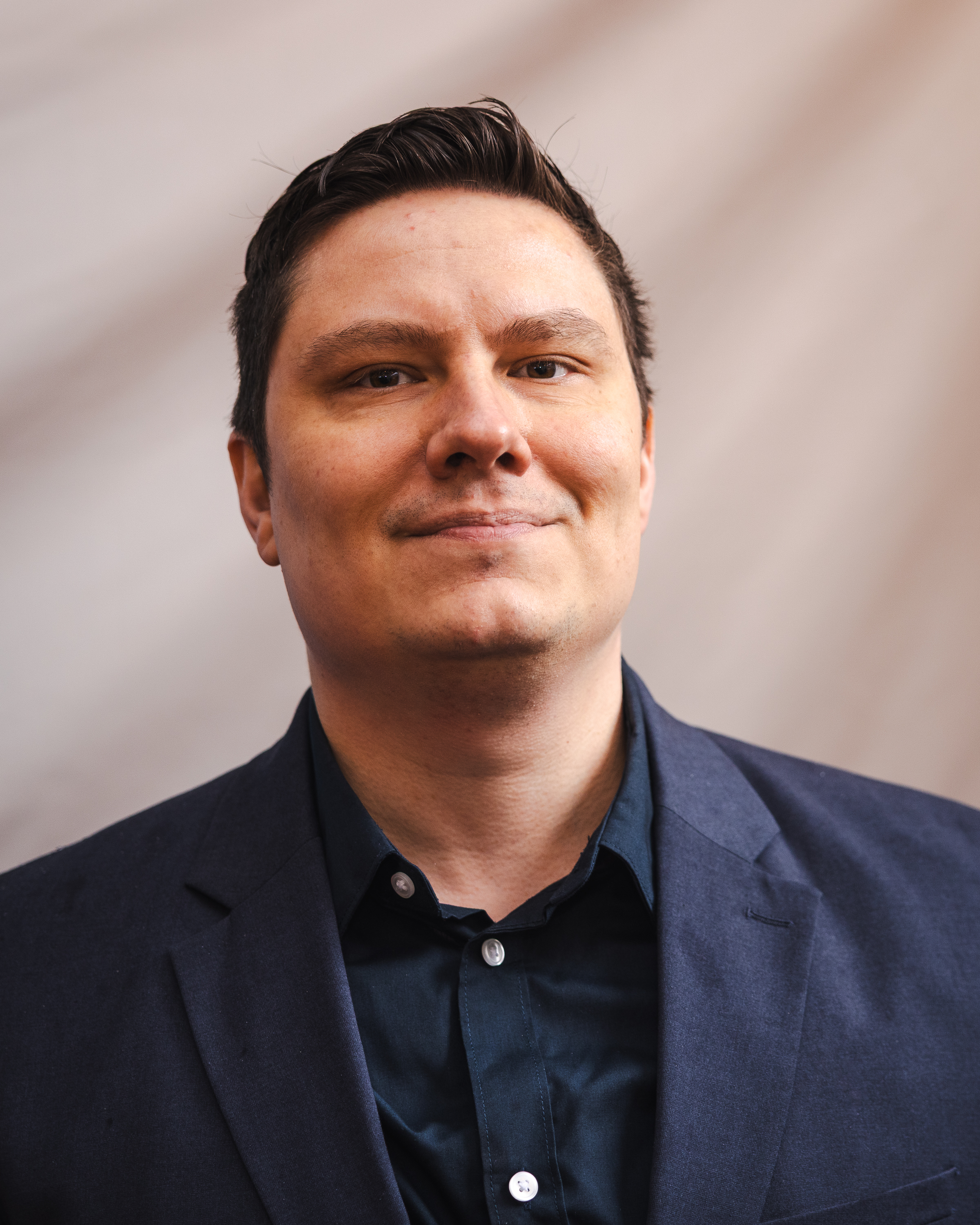
- Hurley in 2025
- Born: Vasili Naumenko; Vladivostok, Russian SFSR, Soviet Union
- Occupations: Film director, film producer
- Years active: 2005-present

Wes Hurley is a Russian-American writer and filmmaker. He has collaborated with many theater, drag, and cabaret performers in Seattle and raised awareness of human rights violations in Russia.

== Early life and education ==
Born and raised in Vladivostok, Russian SFSR, Soviet Union (present-day Vladivostok, Russia), Hurley moved to Seattle in the 1990s at the age of 16 with his mother after she married an American.

== Career ==
Hurley's films, many with gay themes, include Waxie Moon, Waxie Moon in Fallen Jewel, Zolushka, Rusalka, and the web and later TV series Capitol Hill, which premiered in 2014. He has also collaborated with theater, cabaret, and drag performers including Waxie Moon, Sarah Rudinoff, Jinkx Monsoon, BenDeLaCreme, and Jackie Hell, and raised awareness of human rights violations in Russia.

His film Little Potato had its online premiere on Topic and was later picked up by The Atlantic and Criterion Channel. The short is also a Vimeo Staff pick, was short-listed by The Wrap and nominated for Best Short by Cinema Eye Honors. The companion VR piece Potato Dreams premiered at American Film Institute Film Festival and International Documentary Film Festival Amsterdam.

In 2021, Hurley completed Potato Dreams of America - a dark autobiographical comedy starring Dan Lauria, Lea DeLaria, Jonathan Bennett, Sera Barbieri, Tyler Bocock, Marya Sea Kaminsky, Hersh Powers, Lady Rizo, Sophia Mitry Schloss and Lauren Tewes. The film premiered in Narrative Competition at SXSW on March 16, 2021 and subsequently had its European premiere at Deauville American Film Festival where it was nominated for Grand Prize along with Sean Baker's Red Rocket and Pig. The film won several audience and jury awards at festivals around the world including Outstanding Screenplay at Outfest for Hurley and Best Supporting Performance for Lea DeLaria at Tallgrass Film Festival. Cult filmmaker John Waters praised the film's performances and comedic timing after attending its screening at Provincetown International Film Festival. Following its limited theatrical run, the film was positively received by critics and audiences, certified Fresh by Rotten Tomatoes with 91% approval from critics and 85% approval by audiences on the site. Salon named Potato Dreams of America one of "9 of the Best Movies About American Immigrants" along with Everything Everywhere All At Once, Brooklyn and Scarface. The Bay Area Reporter wrote: "Hurley harvests his storytelling skills, resulting in a bumper crop of emotions, with laughter and tears in equal measure." While Variety stated that: "The very existence of Potato Dreams of America is its own happy ending: It’s a calling card, at least, that prompts curiosity over what stories, or whose stories, Hurley will tell next." Hurley has been a regular contributor to Huffington Post.

== Personal life ==
Hurley realized he was gay before leaving Russia; he came out to his mother when he was 16. His autobiographical short film Little Potato, co-directed by Nathan Miller, tells the story of their migration, his adolescence, and his mother's relationship with her spouse, who ultimately came out as transgender.

== Honors ==
In 2013 Hurley was chosen as one of the Artists of the Year by City Arts magazine, along with Megan Griffiths, Macklemore, Ryan Lewis, and Jinkx Monsoon. He was chosen as a Person to Watch in 2015 by The Advocate. In 2019 he won a Creative Capital grant. Little Potato won over two dozen awards from around the world including Jury Awards at South by Southwest, Oslo Fusion, Sarasota Film Festival, Annapolis Film Festival, USA Film Festival and Audience Awards at Outfest, Ashland Independent Film Festival and Mardi Gras Film Festival. For Potato Dreams of America, Hurley was nominated for Grand Jury Award at SXSW and Special Grand Prize at Deauville Film Festival and won Outstanding Screenplay from Outfest and Audience Award at Seattle Queer Film Festival. Hurley also helped produce Yes I Am: The Ric Weiland Story for director, Aaron Bear. Narrated by Zachary Quinto and featuring Bill Gates, film won Special Recognition at GLAAD Media Awards. In 2024, Hurley was awarded Seattle International Film Festival Courageous Documentary Filmmaking Grant for his new film on Shelly's Leg.
