= Shade: The Rusical =

- RuPaul's Drag Race episode
- Episode no.: Season 6 Episode 4
- Presented by: RuPaul
- Original air date: March 17, 2014

Guest appearances
- Lucian Piane (guest composer and judge); Sheryl Lee Ralph (guest judge); Our Lady J (guest pianist)

Episode chronology
← Previous "Scream Queens"	Next → "Snatch Game"

"Shade: The Rusical" is the fourth episode of the sixth season of the American television series RuPaul's Drag Race. It originally aired on March 17, 2014. The episode's main challenge tasks the contestants with performing in a Rusical (musical theatre production) with music composed by Lucian Piane. Piane and Sheryl Lee Ralph are guest judges and Our Lady J is a guest pianist. Courtney Act wins the main challenge and April Carrión is eliminated from the competition after placing in the bottom and losing a lip-sync contestant against Trinity K. Bonet to "I'm Every Woman" by Chaka Khan.

== Episode ==
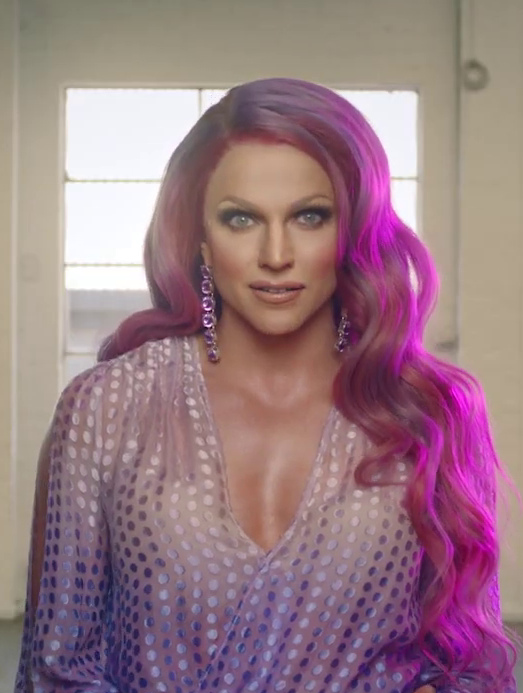
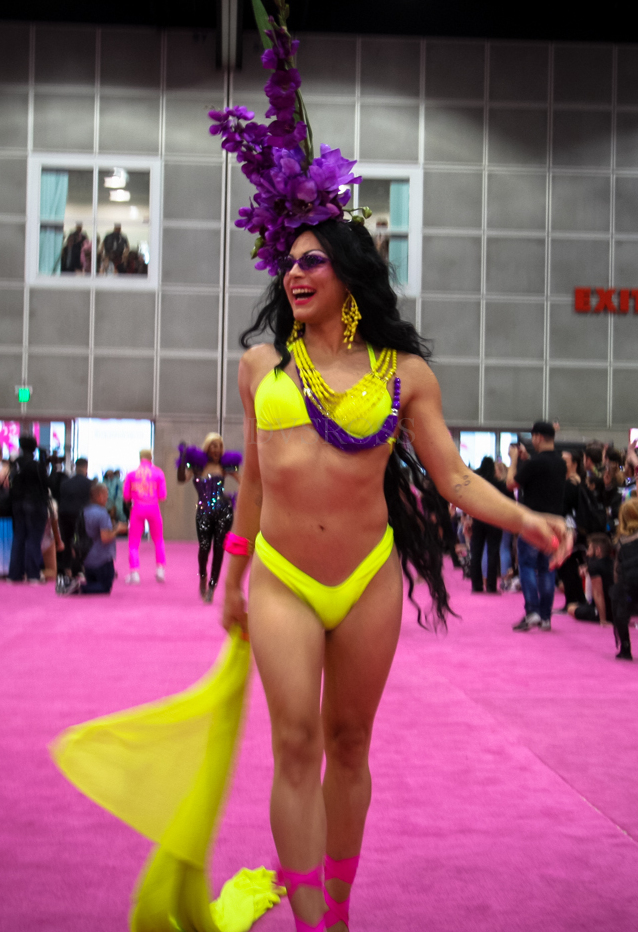
Courtney Act (pictured) wins the episode's main challenge; April Carrión (left, pictured at RuPaul's DragCon LA in 2019) is eliminated from the competition.

The contestants return to the work room after Vivacious's elimination on the previous episode. On a new day, RuPaul greets the group and reveals the main challenge, which tasks the contestants with singing live in a Rusical (musical theatre production) with music composed by Lucian Piane. Adore Delano and BenDeLaCreme are captains and get to select their fellow teammates and assign the roles. Both groups begin to rehearse in the workroom. RuPaul returns to meet with each group, asking questions and offering advice. Before leaving, RuPaul reveals that the runway category for the fashion show is "Tony Awards Glamour".

On the main stage, the contestants rehearse with Piane and his sister Denise, who is a guest choreographer, as well as pianist Our Lady J. Back in the workroom, the contestants make final preparations for the musical and fashion show. Adore Delano and Courtney Act talk about their appearances on American Idol and Australian Idol, respectively. Gia Gunn shares about her experience performing kabuki.

On the main stage, RuPaul welcomes fellow judges Michelle Visage and Santino Rice, as well as guest judges Piane and Sheryl Lee Ralph. RuPaul reveals the assignment, then the contestants perform the Rusical. After the contestants present their runway looks in the fashion show, the judges deliver their critiques, deliberate, then share the results with the group. Adore Delano, BenDeLaCreme, and Courtney Act are deemed the top three contestants, and Courtney Act is declared the winner of the main challenge. April Carrión, Darienne Lake, and Trinity K. Bonet receive negative critiques, and Darienne Lake is deemed safe. April Carrión and Trinity K. Bonet place in the bottom and face off in a lip-sync contest to "I'm Every Woman" (1978) by Chaka Khan. Trinity K. Bonet wins the lip-sync and April Carrión is eliminated from the competition.

== Production and broadcast ==
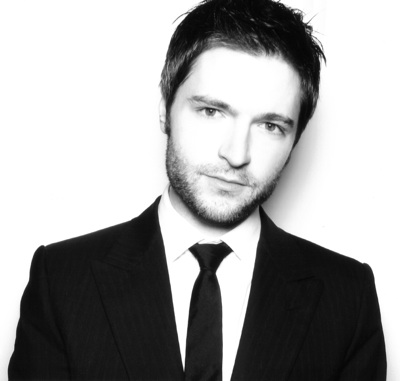
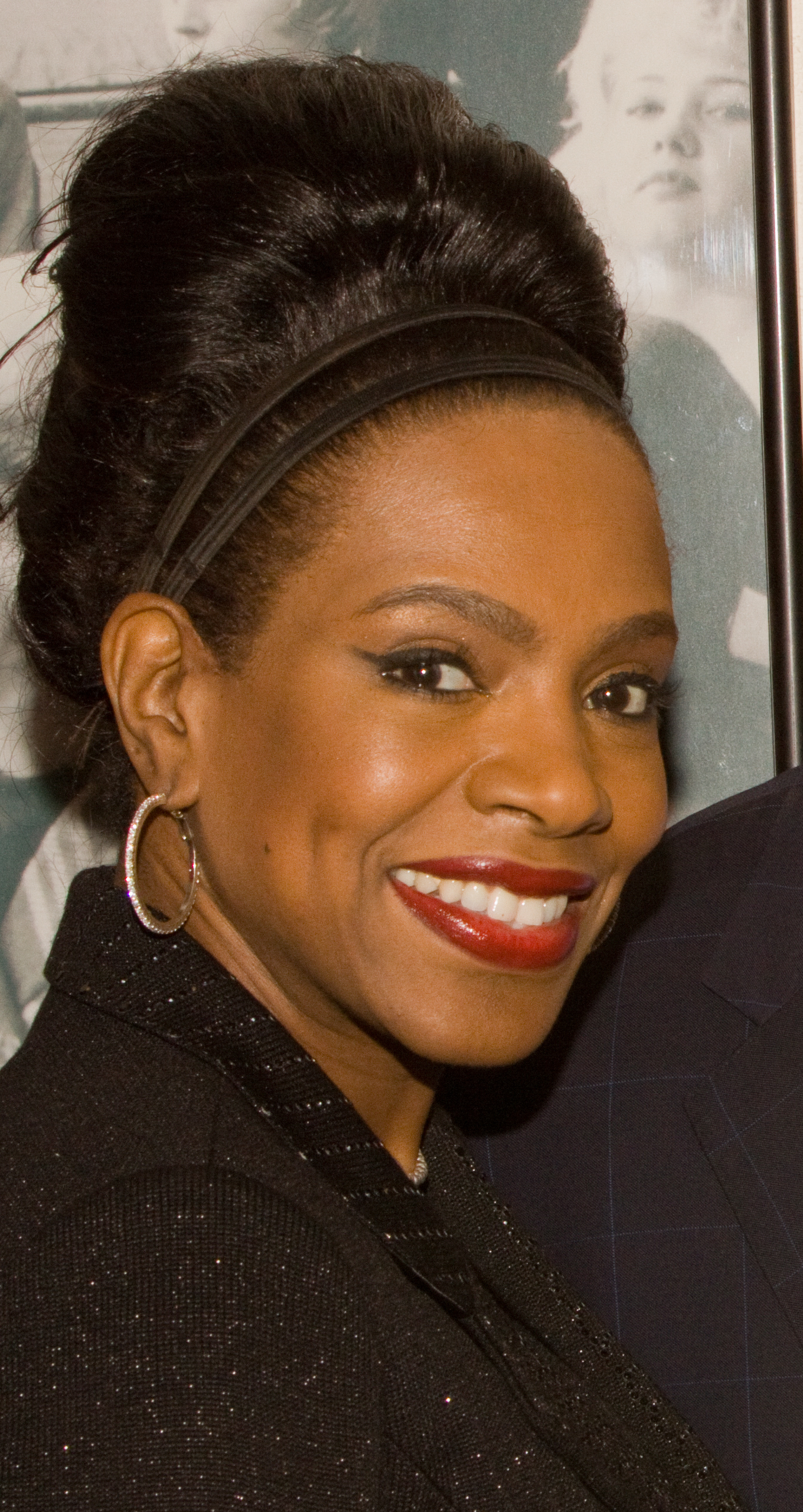
The episode's Rusical features music by Lucian Piane (pictured), who is a guest judge along with Sheryl Lee Ralph (left, pictured in 2012).

The episode originally aired on March 17, 2014.

The show's executive producers decided to include a musical theatre challenge after seeing the cast had two singers who competed in singing competitions. In 2025, Bernardo Sim of Out magazine described "Shade" as the "first-ever actual Rusical in the series". Daniel Reynolds of The Advocate described the Rusical as "a modern-day morality play".

=== Fashion ===
For the fashion show, Bianca Del Rio wears a gold dress. Trinity K. Bonet wears a purple gown and a brown wig. Darienne Lake's dress is green. BenDeLaCreme has an asymmetrical red dress. Courtney Act has a pink dress and a pink wig. Laganja Estranja. Adore Delano has a black outfit with sequins and a long brown wig. April Carrión wears a white dress and a red wig. Joslyn Fox's dress is light blue. Milk gives the illusion of being pregnant.

== Reception ==
Oliver Sava of The A.V. Club gave the episode a rating of 'B+'. Michelle Konopka Alonzo included Ralph in Screen Rant's 2022 overview of the show's best guest judges to date, saying she "was hilariously witty and highly perceptive, and gave some of the queens valuable advice". Alonzo also wrote, " Sheryl's guest appearance gave off a strong motherly vibe, and it was clear that the entertainer and activist really wanted the queens to perform to the best of their abilities... Sheryl was not only an entertaining guest judge, but enjoyed her time getting to know the queens on season 6."

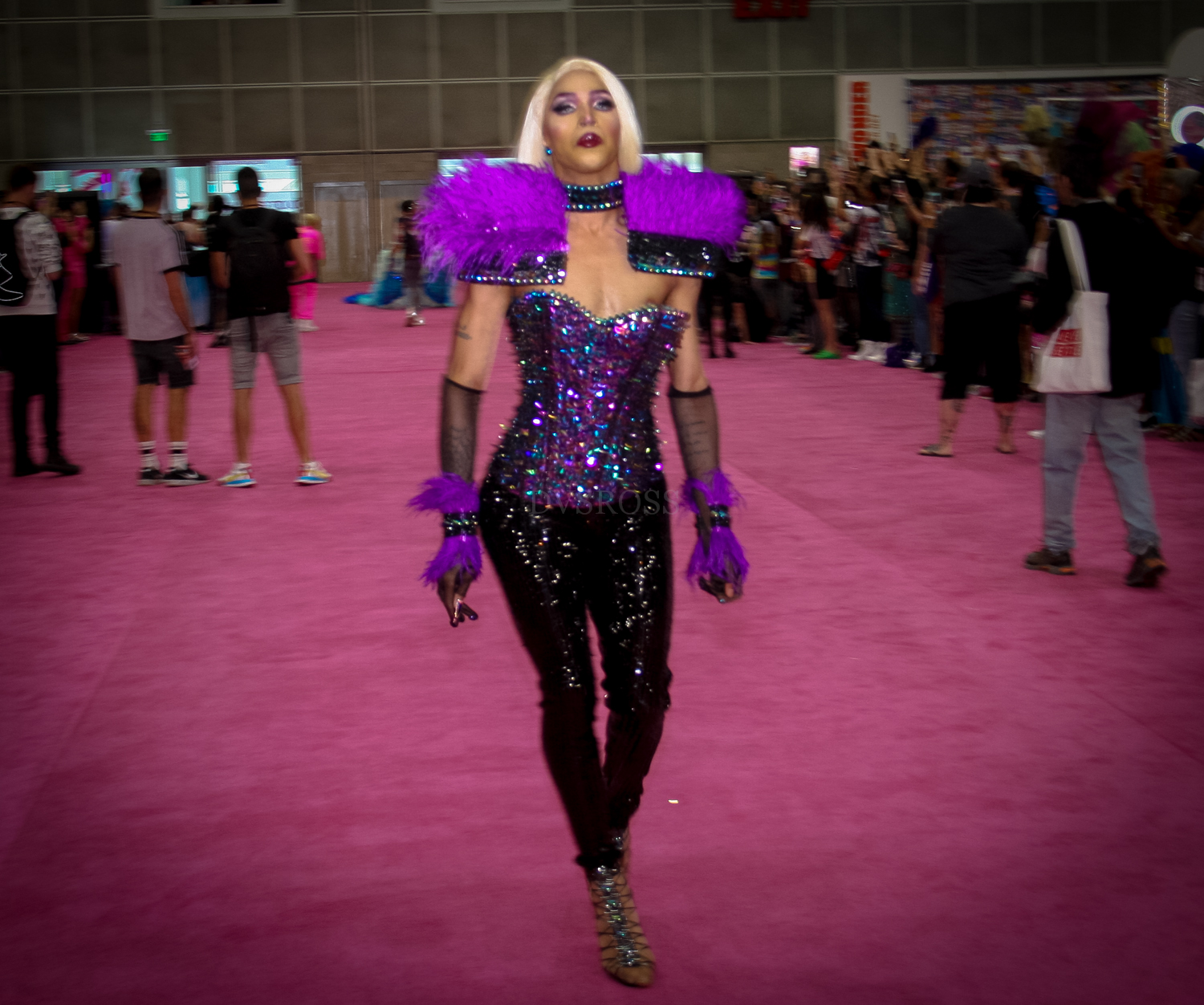
Trinity K. Bonet (pictured at RuPaul's DragCon LA in 2019) wins the episode's lip-sync contest.

IN Magazine ranked "Shade" the seventh best Rusical on Drag Race in 2018. In 2020, Bernado Sim of Screen Rant said the Rusical was among the show's best and called "Shade" an "absolute fan-favorite". Bradley Johnston ranked "Shade" first in Junkee's 2021 list of the show's Rusicals and wrote, "It's hands down one of the greatest seasons the show has ever produced, and a worthy winner of best Rusical." Stephen Daw of Billboard ranked "Shade" ninth in a 2023 list of the show's Rusicals. Charlie Duncan ranked "Shade" sixth in PinkNews's 2024 ranking of Rusicals to date.

Kevin O'Keeffe ranked the "I'm Every Woman" performance number 20 in INTO Magazine's 2018 "definitive ranking" of the show's lip-sync contests to date. Sam Brooks ranked the performance number 24 in The Spinoff's 2019 "definitive ranking" of the show's 162 lip-syncs to date, writing: "Joyous, beautiful, incredible, Linda Evangelista, Christy Turlington. This performance is every woman." Dylan Kickham ranked the song seventh in Elite Daily's 2021 list of the show's "most memorable" lip-syncs. Kickham wrote, "All of Trinity's lip syncs have been iconic, but nothing can match the energy of her very first time serving it up on the Drag Race stage. She proved she was a force to be reckoned with by perfectly encapsulating the confident diva attitude of Chaka Khan's 'I'm Every Woman,' complete with fan snaps and a trip down the stage’s stairs. April definitely held her own, but there was just no denying the power of Trinity." In 2025, Marcus Wratten of PinkNews said the lip-sync contest was the season's best.

== See also ==
- Sheryl Lee Ralph filmography
