= Scream Queens (RuPaul's Drag Race) =

- RuPaul's Drag Race episode
- Episode no.: Season 6 Episode 3
- Presented by: RuPaul
- Original air date: March 10, 2014

Guest appearances
- Linda Blair; Lena Headey

Episode chronology
| ← Previous "RuPaul's Big Opening: Part 2" | Next → "Shade: The Rusical" |

"Scream Queens" is the third episode of the sixth season of the American television series RuPaul's Drag Race. It originally aired on March 10, 2014. The episode's main challenge tasks the contestants with acting in trailers for horror films. Linda Blair and Lena Headey are guest judges. Darienne Lake wins the main challenge. Vivacious is eliminated from the competition after placing in the bottom two and losing a lip-sync contest against April Carrión to "Shake It Up" by Selena Gomez.

== Episode ==
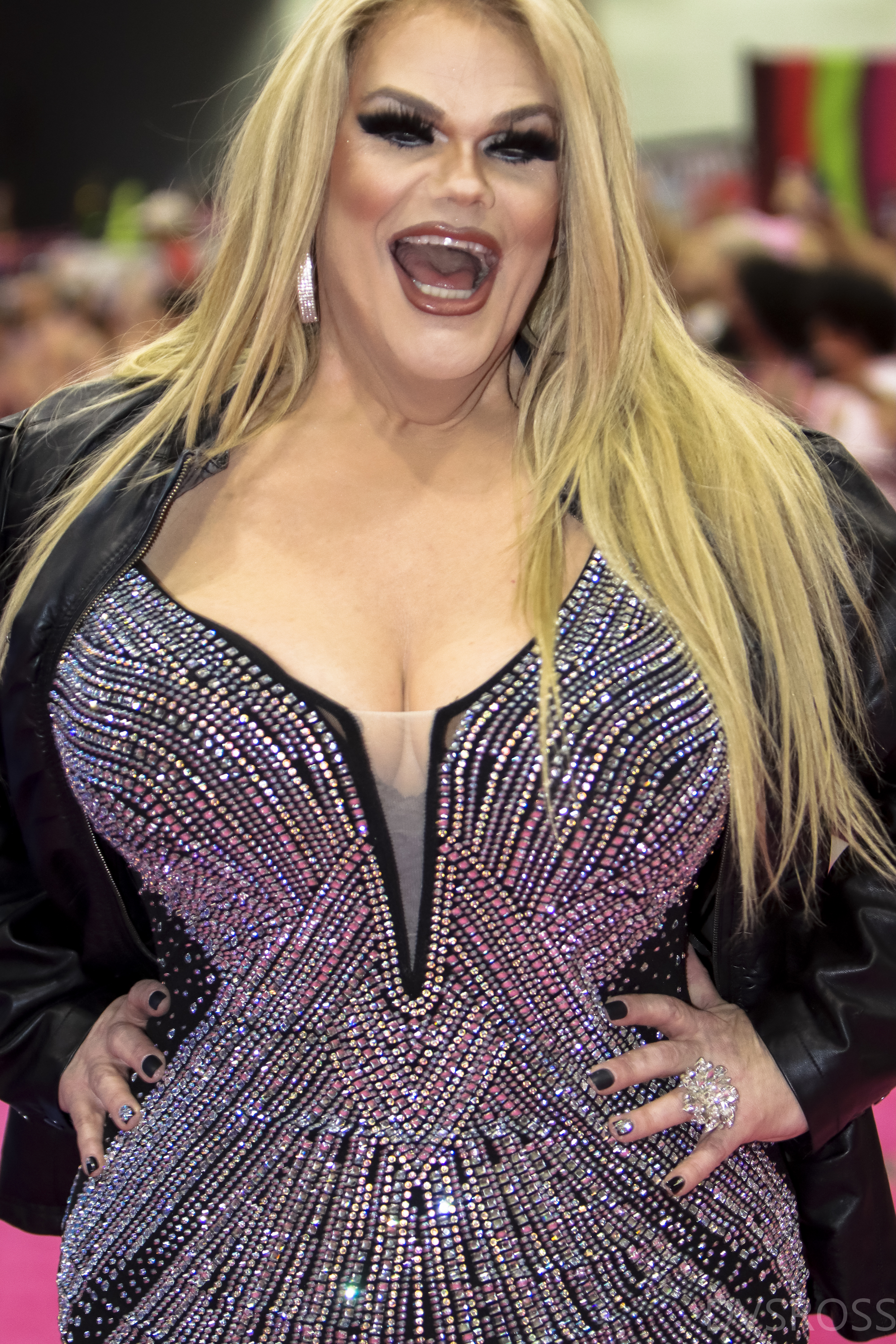
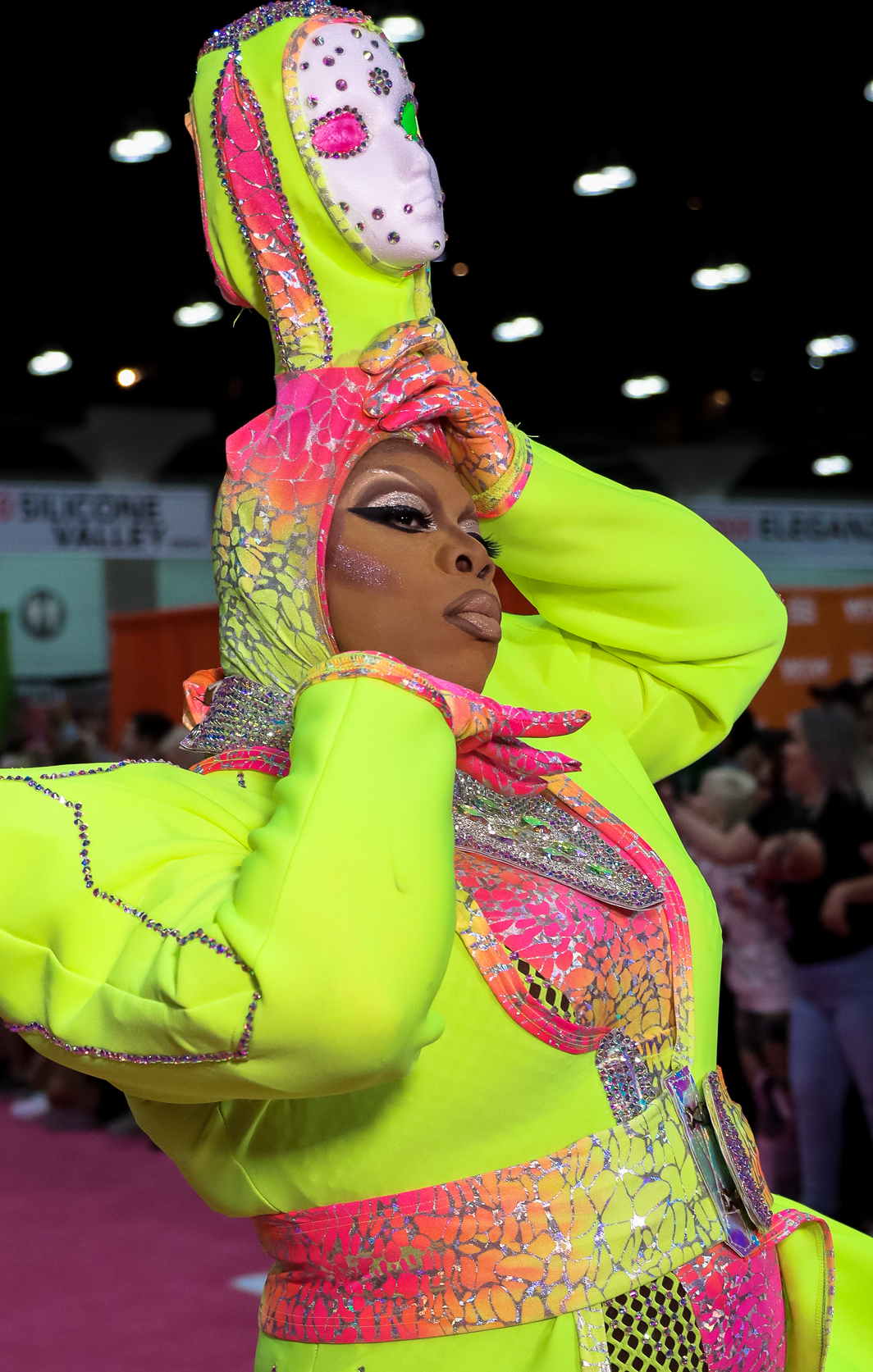
Darienne Lake (left, pictured at RuPaul's DragCon LA in 2018) wins the episode's main challenge; Vivacious (pictured at the same event in 2023) is eliminated from the competition.

In the Werk Room, the two groups of contestants meet for the first time. On a new day, RuPaul greets the merged group and reveals the mini-challenge, which tasks the contestants with pairing up to create characters and lip-sync to RuPaul's song "Click Clack" on a beach set. Adore Delano and Milk win the mini-challenge. RuPaul then reveals the main challenge, which tasks the contestants with starring in trailers for the fictional horror film franchise Drag Me to Hell. One is set in the 1960s and the other is set in the 1980s. As the winners of the mini-challenge, Adore Delano and Milk are team captains and select their fellow team members. Following are the teams:

- Team Adore Delano (1980s theme): Adore Delano, April Carrión, BenDeLaCreme, Gia Gunn, Laganja Estranja, and Vivacious
- Team Milk (1960s theme): Bianca Del Rio, Courtney Act, Darienne Lake, Joslyn Fox, Milk, and Trinity K. Bonet

The members of each group decide on their roles, then begin to learn their lines. The groups film with RuPaul and Michelle Visage. On elimination day, the contestants make final preparations in the Werk Room for the fashion show. Vivacious talks about being a club kid. Trinity K. Bonet talks about wanting to be a Beyoncé impersonator.

On the main stage, RuPaul welcomes fellow judges Visage and Santino Rice, as well as guest judges Linda Blair and Lena Headey. RuPaul shares the runway category ("Best Drag"), then the fashion show commences. After the contestants present their looks, the group watches the two trailers. The judges deliver their critiques, deliberate, then share the results with the group. Team Milk is the winning team, and Darienne Lake wins the challenge. Team Adore Delano is the losing team. Adore Delano, April Carrión, and Vivacious receive negative critiques, and Adore Delano is deemed safe. April Carrión and Vivacious place in the bottom and face off in a lip-sync contest to "Shake It Up" by Selena Gomez. April Carrión wins the lip-sync and Vivacious is eliminated from the competition.

== Production and broadcast ==
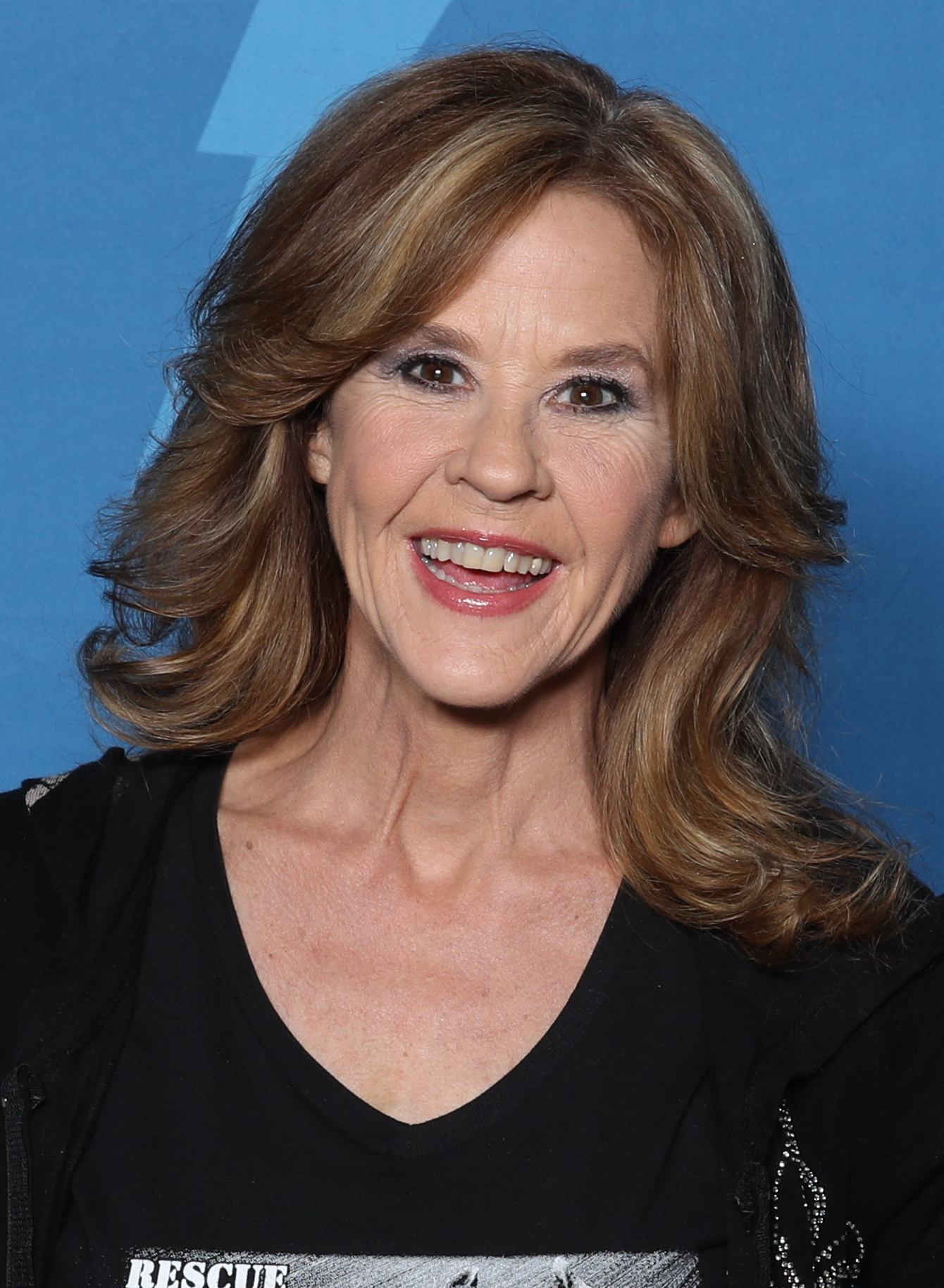
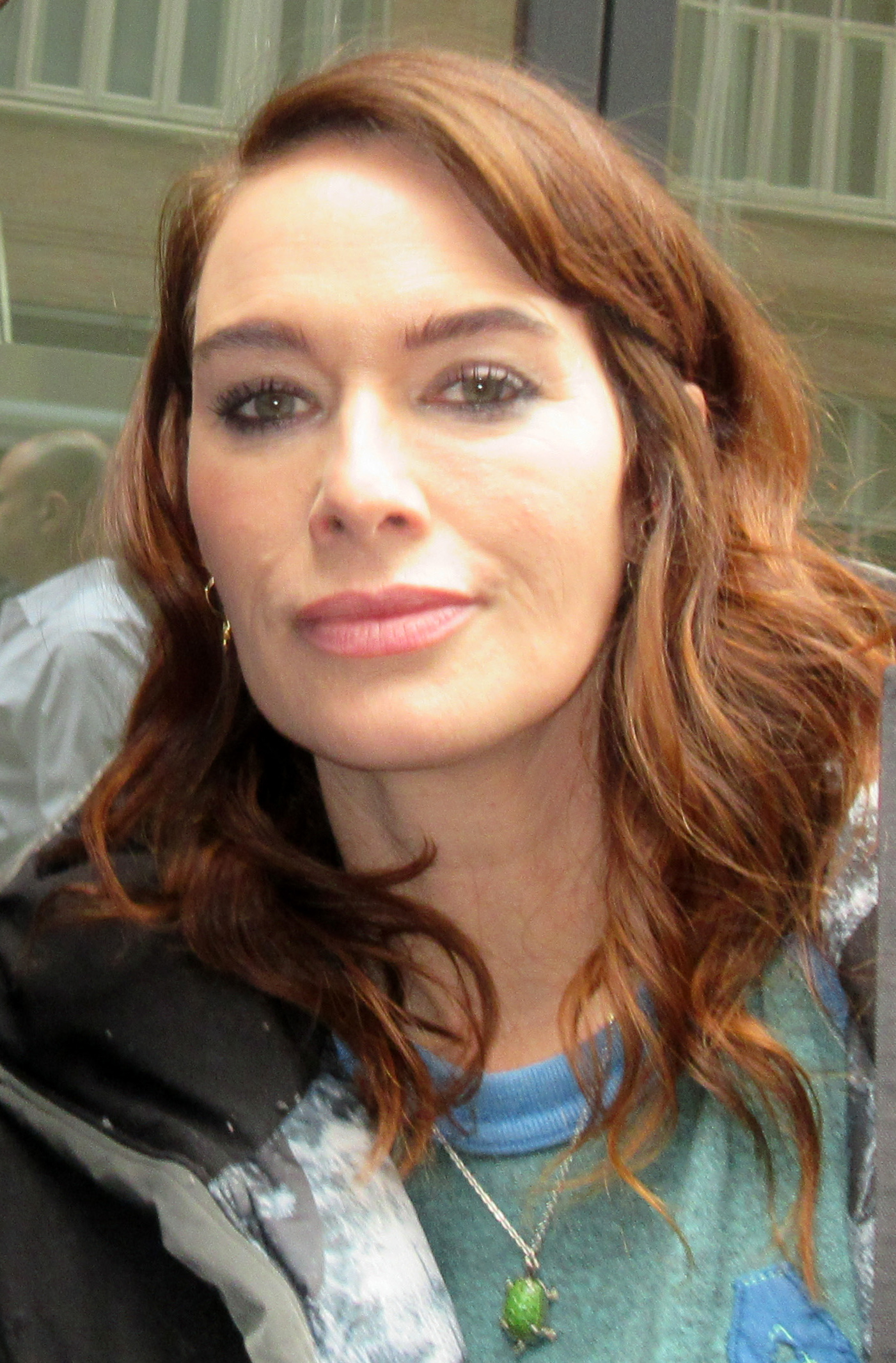
Linda Blair (left, pictured in 2018) and Lena Headey (right, pictured in 2019) are guest judges.

The episode originally aired on March 10, 2014.

In her trailer, Dairenne Lake plays a head-only role.

=== Fashion ===
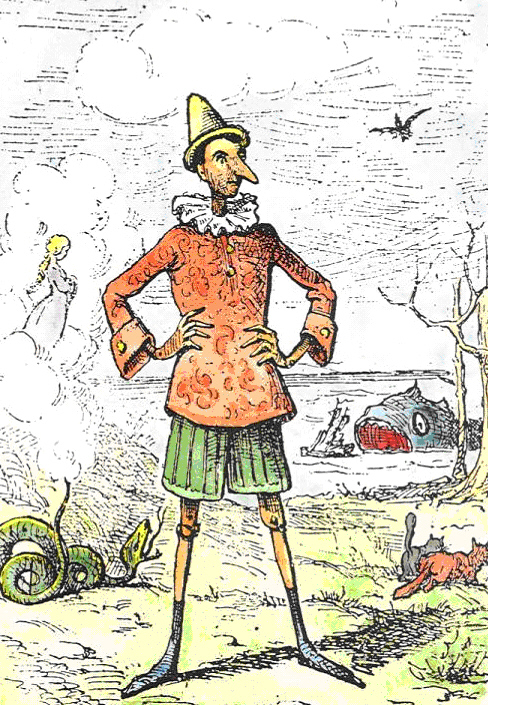
For the fashion show, Milk wears an outfit inspired by the fictional character Pinocchio (pictured is an illustration by Enrico Mazzanti).

For the main stage, RuPaul wears a black-and-red dress. For the fashion show, Biana Del Rio wears a widow-inspired dress. Courtney Act's outfit is inspired by the flag of Australia. Joslyn Fox has a disco-inspired gold dress. Trinity K. Bonet wears an orange dress and matching jewelry. Milk has a Pinnochio-inspired outfit with a long fake nose. Darienne Lake's silver outfit has a cape. April Carrión wears a yellow outfit and she carries an umbrella with materials hanging to give the illusion of rain. Laganja Estranja has a peach dress and a tall fascinator. Gia Gunn's bodysuit is black, green, and purple. She wears a headpiece. Adore Delano has a black dress and a large red wig. BenDeLaCreme has a pin-up-inspired pink outfit with an animal print and a large bow on the back. She wears a headpiece resembling cat ears. Vivacious has a black-and-red outfit with large spikes.

== Reception ==
Oliver Sava of The A.V. Club gave the episode a rating of 'A-'. Jom Elauria included the main challenge in Screen Rant's 2022 list of the show's ten best main challenges requiring contestants to act. Elauria said Team Milk "did well as they acted the campy lines with conviction and heart" and Team Adore Delano "had difficulty as they forgot their lines, missed their cues, and failed to follow directions properly". Elauria also opined, "Overall, the challenge was thoroughly entertaining, but it was Team Milk that nailed the campy-horror vibe that the judges wanted to see." In 2023, Josh Korngut included Drag Me to Hell in Pride.com's 2023 list of the show's ten best horror film references, calling the acting challenge "one of the most memorable in all of Drag Race Herstory". Korngut wrote, "This challenge showcased performances to die for, including a winning role by Darienne Lake as a ghoulish, but ultimately misunderstood, head in a box... While this challenge has virtually nothing to do with the outstanding namesake Drag Me to Hell, it's still one of the best horror moments from the franchise." In 2025, Marcus Wratten of PinkNews said the main challenge "was genuinely well-written and worth our time".

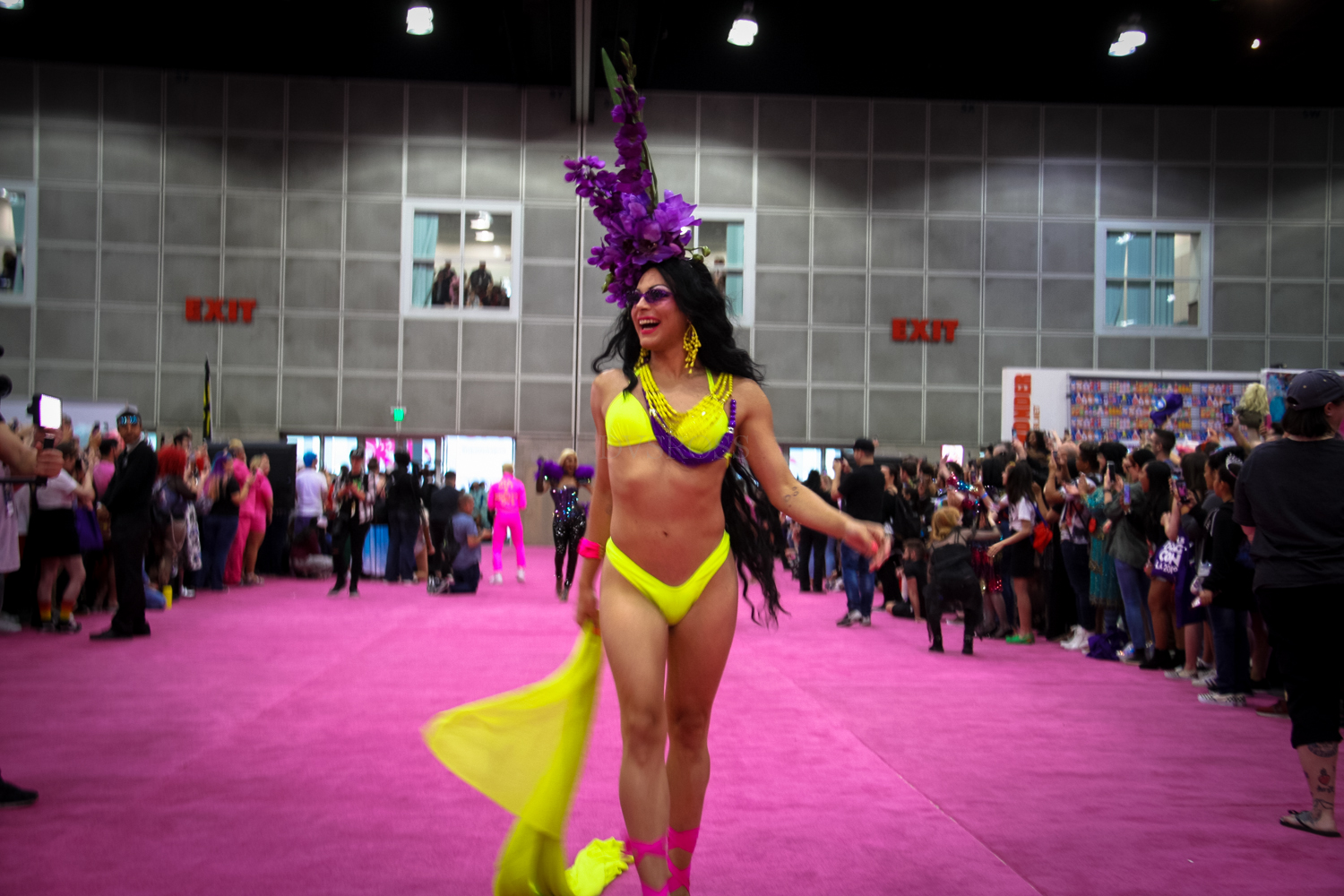
April Carrión (pictured at RuPaul's DragCon LA in 2019) wins the lip-sync contest.

Gregory Rosebrugh said of the lip-sync contest: "However unremarkable the song is, both queens brought cheeky, high-energy performances for which we will fondly remember their short runs in this competition. No other queen in season six can walk like Vivacious, and April's physical resemblance to Selena Gomez is almost eerie." Bernardo Sim included Vivacious in Screen Rant's 2018 list of fifteen contestants who were eliminated "for crazy reasons". Sim described the lip-sync as "baffling" and said Vivacious "apparently fell short and was sent home, despite being a clearly more talented contestant than April, who was sent home the next episode." Kevin O'Keeffe ranked the "Shake It Up" performance number 108 in INTO Magazine's 2018 "definitive ranking" of the show's lip-sync contests to date. Sam Brooks ranked the contest number 83 in The Spinoff's 2019 "definitive ranking" of the show's 162 lip-syncs to date. Daniel Welsh included Vivacious in HuffPost UK's 2020 list of eleven contestants "who sashayed away too soon". Welsh wrote:

This is no disrespect to April Carrión. She was probably the worthy winner of the lip sync, delivering the performance most loyal to Selena Gomez’s Shake It Up. But therein lies the problem, the two queens are such different performers that April was always going to be at an advantage. Had the lip sync routine been to a track a bit closer to the middle of their abilities, we could easily imagine this having gone a different way.

== See also ==
- Lena Headey filmography
- LGBTQ themes in horror films
- "Screech" (Canada's Drag Race)
