= RuPaul's Big Opening =

- RuPaul's Drag Race episode
- Episode no.: Season 6 Episode 1
- Presented by: RuPaul
- Original air date: February 24, 2014

Guest appearances
- Adam Lambert; Mike Ruiz

Episode chronology
← Previous "Reunited"	Next → "RuPaul's Big Opening: Part 2"

"RuPaul's Big Opening" (sometimes subtitled "Part 1") is the first episode of the sixth season of the American television series RuPaul's Drag Race. It originally aired on February 24, 2014. The episode's main challenge tasks the contestants with presenting three looks in a fashion show. Adam Lambert and Mike Ruiz are guest judges. BenDeLaCreme wins the main challenge. Kelly Mantle is eliminated from the competition after placing in the bottom and losing a lip-sync contest against Vivacious to "Express Yourself" by Madonna.

== Episode ==
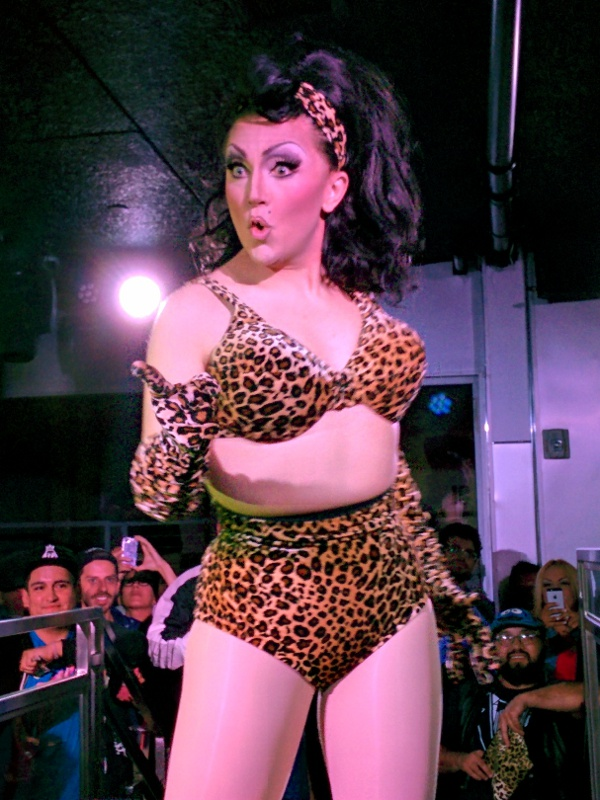
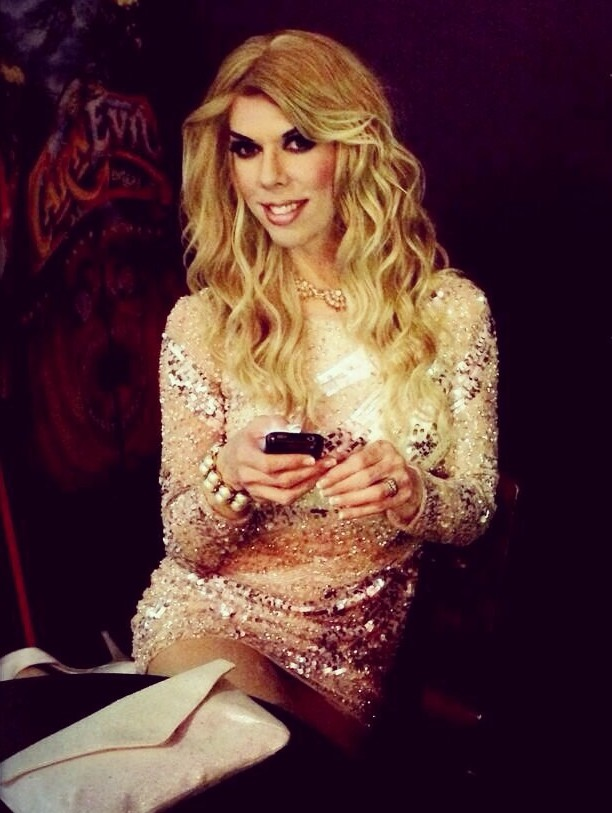
BenDeLaCreme (left, pictured in 2014) win's the episode's main challenge; Kelly Mantle (right) is eliminated from the competition.

Seven new contestants enter the Werk Room. RuPaul greets the group and announces that this season will be a split premiere. For the first mini-challenge, the contestants are tasked with participating in a photo shoot while jumping off a platform. Mike Ruiz is the photographer and members of the Pit Crew, including Shawn Morales, assist with the photo shoot. After reviewing the photographs, RuPaul declares Laganja Estranja the winner of the mini-challenge.

RuPaul then takes the group to a studio with a truck with of boxes and introduces the main challenge, which tasks the contestants with creating an outfit inspired by a TV show, using materials from a themed box. As the winner of the mini-challenge, Laganja Estranja is taken with assigning the TV shows to each contestant. Following are the contestants and TV shows:

- Adore Delano – Here Comes Honey Boo Boo
- April Carrión – Duck Dynasty
- BenDeLaCreme – The Golden Girls
- Gia Gunn – Keeping Up with the Kardashians
- Kelly Mantle – Downton Abbey
- Laganja Estranja – Dancing with the Stars
- Vivacious – Game of Thrones

In the Werk Room, RuPaul meets with each contestant to ask questions and offer advice. Before leaving, RuPaul shares that Adam Lambert is a guest judge. On the main stage, RuPaul welcomes fellow judges Michelle Visage and Santino Rice, as well as guest judges Lambert and Ruiz. RuPaul shares the assignment, then the fashion show commences. After the contestants present their looks, the judges deliver their critiques, deliberate, then share the results with the group. April Carrión, BenDeLaCreme, and Gia Gunn receive positive critiques, and BenDeLaCreme wins the challenge. Adore Delano, Kelly Mantle, and Vivacious receive negative critiques, and Adore Delano is deemed safe. Kelly Mantle and Vivacious place in the bottom and face off in a lip-sync contest to "Express Yourself" (1989) by Madonna. Vivacious wins the lip-sync and Kelly Mantle is eliminated from the competition.

== Production and broadcast ==
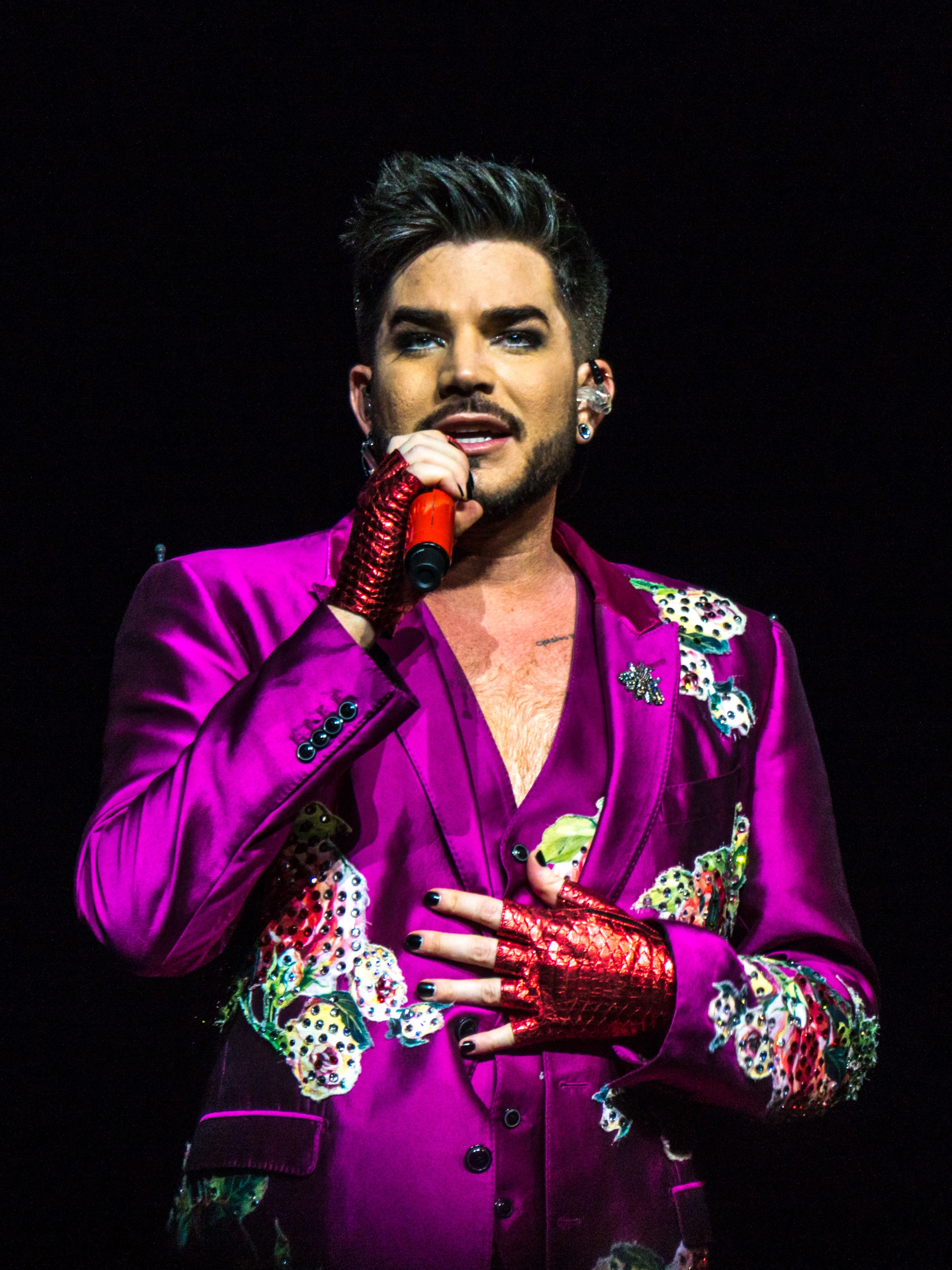
Adam Lambert (pictured in 2017) is a guest judge.

The episode originally aired on February 24, 2014.

During the mini-challenge Vivacious says the head on the top of her outfit is called Ornacia. The season's finale had an "ode" to Ornacia.

=== Fashion ===
For her entrance look, Adore Delano wears a short red dress, matching gloves, and a green wig. BenDeLaCreme wears a green dress and gold shoes. Gia Gunn has a black-and-white swimsuit, a large circular handbag, and a long ponytail. Laganja Estranja wears a colorful short dress and she has a small hat with long feathers. April Carrión's outfit is inspired by scouting. Kelly Mantle has a black dress with pink heart symbols, as well as sunglasses. Vivacious wears a Leigh Bowery-inspired outfit with a head on top; she pulls down a zipper to reveal her face.

For the fashion show, Gia Gunn wears a black-and-white outfit with black shoes. April Carrión's outfit has plaid. Laganja Estranja's outfit is black and silver. Kelly Mantle has a long blue dress and red hair. Visage says Kelly Mantle's top resembles strips of bacon. Adore Delano has a blue dress with a pink belt, pink shoes, and a pink wig. Vivacious has a light purple dress and crows on her wrists. BenDeLaCreme has a colorful outfit and a headpiece. In 2021, Amii Johnson of Screen Rant wrote, "DeLa’s conceptual, couture gown hugged every curve of their body. In fact, the construction was so impeccable that it’s difficult to believe that DeLa put it together with hot glue (and desperation) alone. Finished with a striking headpiece, and a cheesecake in hand, this garment was a runway look to remember."

== Reception ==
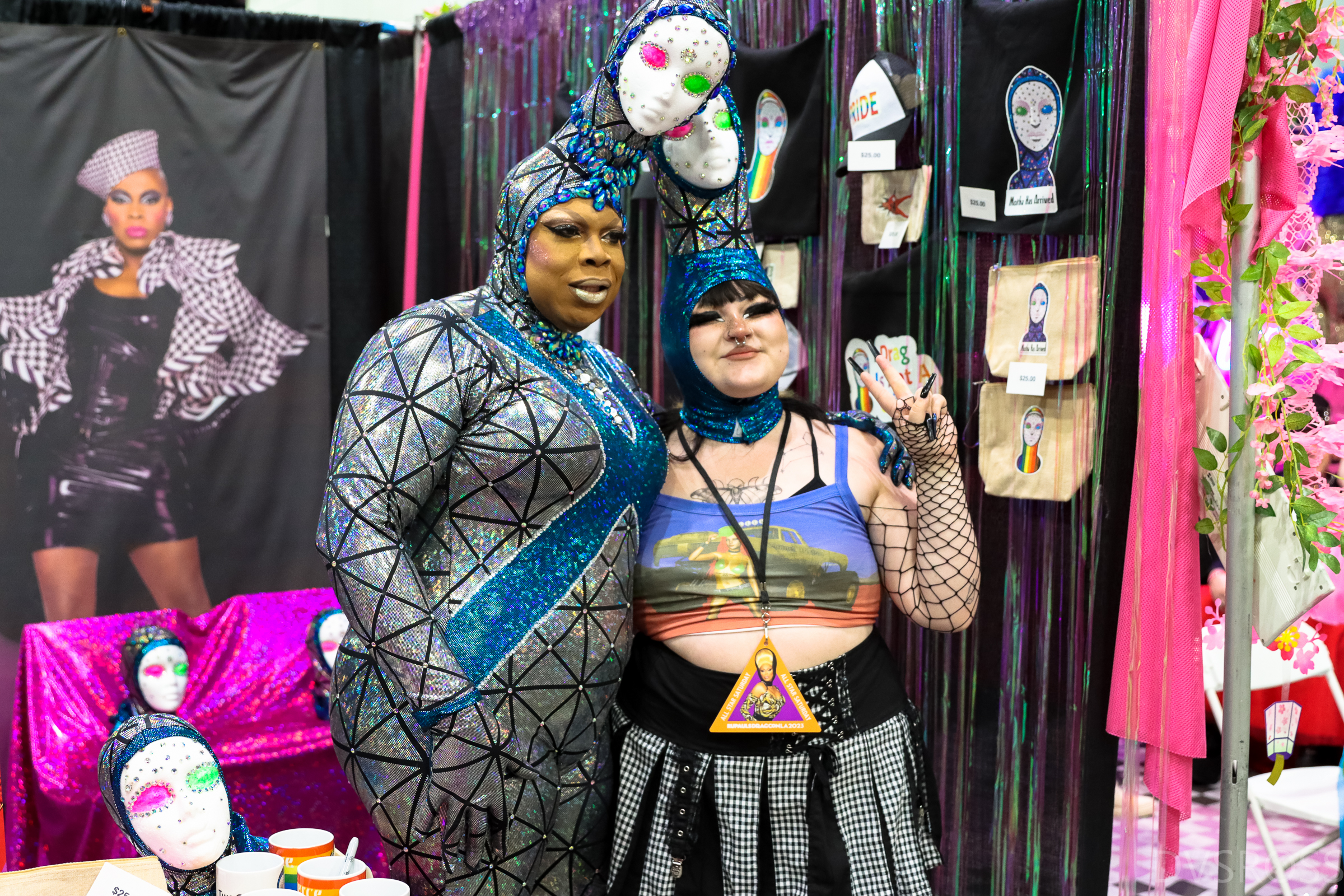
Vivacious (left) wearing an outfit with Ornacia at RuPaul's DragCon LA in 2023.

Kevin O'Keeffe ranked the "Express Yourself" performance number 116 in INTO Magazine's 2018 "definitive ranking" of the show's lip-sync contests to date. He wrote, "Fun fact: We had to rewatch this lip sync for this list, and within two days, we've already forgotten what happened in it. Vivacious did a lot of walking, we think? This is the worst kind of Drag Race lip sync: If you're going to blow it, at least make it memorable!" Sam Brooks ranked "Express Yourself" number 132 in The Spinoff's 2019 "definitive ranking" of the show's 162 lip-syncs to date. Mariana Fernandes included April Carrión in Screen Rant's 2019 list of ten "design challenge runner-ups that should have won" and wrote, "this win belonged to April Carrión, and her edgy backless number inspired by Duck Dynasty. It was a departure for her in terms of looks, and it showed just how versatile this talented queen actually was. It was a shame we didn't see more of her." The website's Caitlin Griffin included Vivacious and Ornacia in a 2021 list of the season's ten "most memorable moments" and quipped, "Ultimately, Ornacia ended up being more of a standout than the drag queen who wore her."
