= Scream Queens =

Scream Queens may refer to:

- Scream Queens (2008 TV series), an American reality series
- Scream Queens (2015 TV series), an American comedy horror series
- "Scream Queens" (RuPaul's Drag Race), a 2014 episode of the American television series RuPaul's Drag Race

== See also ==
- Scream queen
- Scream, Queen! My Nightmare on Elm Street, a 2019 American documentary film
