= Fair Game =

Fair Game may refer to:

== Film ==
- Fair Game (1928 film), a German silent drama film
- Fair Game (1986 film), an Australian action film
- Fair Game (1988 film), an Italian thriller-horror film
- Fair Game, a 1994 television film starring Lena Headey
- Fair Game (1995 film), an American action thriller
- Fair Game (2005 film), an American romantic comedy
- Fair Game (2010 film), an American biographical political drama

== Literature ==
- "Fair Game" (short story), a 1959 short story by Philip K. Dick
- Fair Game (memoir), a 2007 book by Valerie Plame Wilson; basis for the 2010 film (see above)
- Fair Game, a 1974 novel by Paula Gosling; basis for the 1995 film (see above)
- Fair Game, a 2012 fantasy novel by Patricia Briggs

== Music ==
- Fair Game, a 1990s American band fronted by Ron Keel
- Fair Game (EP), by the Sports, 1978
- "Fair Game", a song by Crosby, Stills & Nash from CSN, 1977

== Television episodes ==
- "Fair Game" (Falcon Crest), 1986
- "Fair Game" (Heartbeat), 1994
- "Fair Game" (Homeland), 2017
- "Fair Game" (The King of Queens), 2000
- "Fair Game" (Nash Bridges), 2001
- "Fair Game" (Stargate SG-1), 1999

== Other uses ==
- Fair Game (radio program), a 2007–2008 Public Radio International program hosted by Faith Salie
- Fair game (Scientology), a Church of Scientology policy
- Fair Game, a 1957 Broadway play starring Sam Levene

== See also ==
- "Fare Game", a 2006 episode of CSI: NY
- Fairgame$, a cancelled video game developed by Jade Raymond's Haven Studios
