= Lena Headey filmography =

Lena Headey is an English actress and producer. Headey studied acting at Shelley College where she performed in a number of school productions at the Royal National Theatre. She made her film debut in the 1992 mystery drama Waterland. After appearing in a series of supporting parts throughout the 1990s, she went on to find fame for lead performances in big-budget films such as the fantasy film The Brothers Grimm (2005) and the action film 300 (2007), portraying Gorgo, Queen of Sparta, a role she yet again played in 300: Rise of an Empire (2014).

She gained international recognition in 2011 with the HBO fantasy drama series Game of Thrones for her portrayal of Cersei Lannister. As of 2016, Headey has received consecutive Primetime Emmy nominations from 2014 to 2016 and 2018 to 2019, and one Golden Globe Award nomination. In 2017, Headey became one of the highest paid actors on television and earned £2 million per episode of Game of Thrones.

Headey played the villain Ma-Ma in the science fiction action film Dredd (2012). The following year she appeared in the horror film The Purge (2013). She then starred in the historical comedy horror Pride and Prejudice and Zombies (2016).

== Film ==
Key
†	Denotes films that have not yet been released

Table featuring feature films with Lena Headey
Year	Title	Role	Notes	Ref.
1992	Waterland	Young Mary		
1993	The Remains of the Day	Lizzie		
1993	Century	Miriam		
1993	The Summer House	Margaret	Film also known as Clothes in the Wardrobe	
1994	The Jungle Book	Katherine "Kitty" Brydon		
1995	The Grotesque	Cleo Coal		
1997	Face	Connie		
1997	Mrs Dalloway	Young Sally		
1998	The Man with Rain in His Shoes	Sylvia Weld		
1999	Inside-Out	Window Dresser	Short film	
1999	Onegin	Olga		
2000	Ropewalk	Allison		
2000	Gossip	Cathy Jones		
2000	Aberdeen	Kaisa		
2001	The Parole Officer	Emma		
2002	Anazapta	Lady Matilda Mellerby		
2002	Possession	Blanche Glover		
2002	Ripley's Game	Sarah Trevanny		
2003	The Actors	Dolores		
2003	No Verbal Response	Megan Pillay	Short film	
2005	The Brothers Grimm	Angelika		
2005	The Cave	Dr. Kathryn Jennings		
2005	Round About Five	Girlfriend	Short film	
2005	Imagine Me & You	Luce		
2006	Vacancy	Pam Bishop	Short film	
2007	300	Gorgo, Queen of Sparta		
2007	The Contractor	DI Annette Ballard	Direct-to-DVD	
2007	St Trinian's	Miss Dickinson		
2008	The Broken	Gina McVey		
2008	The Red Baron	Käte Otersdorf		
2008	Whore	Mom		
2009	The Devil's Wedding	The Devil's Bride	Short film; Also executive producer	
2009	Laid to Rest	Cindy	Direct-to-DVD	
2009	Tell-Tale	Elizabeth Clemson		
2010	Pete Smalls Is Dead	Shannah		
2012	Dredd	Madeline "Ma-Ma" Madrigal		
2013	The Purge	Mary Sandin		
2013	The Mortal Instruments: City of Bones	Jocelyn Fray		
2014	The Adventurer: The Curse of the Midas Box	Monica		
2014	Low Down	Sheila Albany		
2014	300: Rise of an Empire	Gorgo, Queen of Sparta		
2015	Zipper	Jeannie Ellis		
2015	Unity	Narrator	Documentary	
2016	Pride and Prejudice and Zombies	Lady Catherine de Bourgh		
2016	Kingsglaive: Final Fantasy XV	Lunafreya Nox Fleuret	Voice; English dub	
2017	Thumper	Ellen		
2018	Leading Lady Parts	Herself	Short film	
2019	Fighting with My Family	Julia Bevis		
2019	The Flood	Wendy	Also executive producer	
2019	The Trap	—N/a	Short film; director and writer	
2021	Twist	Sikes		
2021	Gunpowder Milkshake	Scarlet		
2022	9 Bullets	Gypsy		
2022	Thor: Love and Thunder	Unknown	Deleted scenes	
2022	DC League of Super-Pets	Lara	Voice	
2025	Long Pork	Unknown	Short film	
2025	H Is for Hawk	—N/a	Producer	
2025	Normal	Moira		
2025	Ballistic	Nance Redfield		
TBA	Red, White & Royal Wedding †	Princess Catherine	Post-production	

== Television ==
Table featuring television programs with Lena Headey
Year	Title	Role	Notes	Ref.
1993	Screen Two	Margaret	Episode: "The Clothes in the Wardrobe"	
1993	Spender	Emily Goodman	2 episodes	
1993	How We Used To Live	Grace Palmer	3 episodes	
1993	Soldier Soldier	Shenna Bowles	3 episodes	
1994	Fair Game	Ellie	Television film	
1994	MacGyver: Trail to Doomsday	Elise Moran	Television film	
1995	Devil's Advocate	Clare Rigby	Television film	
1995	Loved Up	Sarah	Television film	
1996	Ballykissangel	Jenny Clark	Episode: "The Things We Do for Love"	
1996–1997	Band of Gold	Colette	8 episodes	
1997	Kavanagh QC	Natasha Jackson	Episode: "Diplomatic Baggage"	
1997	The Hunger	Steph Reynolds	Episode: "Ménage à Trois"	
1998	Merlin	Queen Guinevere	2 episodes	
2002	The Gathering Storm	Ava Wigram	Television film	
2004	The Long Firm	Ruby Ryder	2 episodes	
2006	Ultra	Penny / Ultra	Pilot	
2008–2009	Terminator: The Sarah Connor Chronicles	Sarah Connor	31 episodes	
2009	The Super Hero Squad Show	Black Widow / Mystique	Voice, episode: "Deadly Is the Black Widow's Bite!"	
2011	White Collar	Sally	Episode: "Taking Account"	
2011–2019	Game of Thrones	Cersei Lannister	62 episodes	
2013	Sesame Street	Herself	Episode: "Simon Says"	
2014–2017	Uncle Grandpa	Aunt Grandma	Voice, 4 episodes	
2015–2019	Danger Mouse	Jeopardy Mouse	Voice, 9 episodes	
2017–2018	Trollhunters: Tales of Arcadia	Morgana le Fay/The Pale Lady	Voice, 13 episodes	
2018	Sally4Ever	Herself	Episode: "Episode 4"	
2018–2020	Rise of the Teenage Mutant Ninja Turtles	Big Mama	Voice, 9 episodes	
2019	The Dark Crystal: Age of Resistance	Maudra Fara	Voice, 6 episodes	
2019–2021	Infinity Train	Amelia, The Conductor, Teacher	Voice, 9 episodes	
2020	Wizards: Tales of Arcadia	Morgana le Fay	Voice, 9 episodes	
2021–2024	Masters of the Universe	Evil-Lyn, Majestra	Voice, 14 episodes	
2023	White House Plumbers	Dorothy Hunt	5 episodes	
2023–2024	Beacon 23	Aster Calyx	9 episodes; also executive producer (season 1)	
2025	The Abandons	Fiona Nolan	7 episodes	
2026	Youth	—N/a	Writer, 1 episode	
2027	Blackmere †	TBA	Post-production	
TBA	New-Gen †	Thea	Voice; in production	

== Music videos ==
Table featuring music videos with Samuel L. Jackson
Year	Title	Artist	Notes	Ref.
2004	"Bellissimo"	Ilya		
2017	"Ill Ray (The King)"	Kasabian		
2019	"You Mean the World to Me"	Freya Ridings	Director	
2020	"Miracle"	Madeon	Director	

== Video games ==
Table featuring video games with Lena Headey
Year	Title	Voice role	Ref.
2009	Risen	Patty / Cathy / Jasmin / Lily	
2012	Dishonored	Callista Curnow	
2014–2015	Game of Thrones	Cersei Lannister	
2021	The Artful Escape	Tastemaker	

== Audio ==
Table featuring audio with Lena Headey
Year	Title	Role	Notes	Ref.
2023	White House Plumbers Podcast	Herself	Episode 4	
