= RuPaul's Big Opening: Part 2 =

- RuPaul's Drag Race episode
- Episode no.: Season 6 Episode 2
- Presented by: RuPaul
- Original release date: March 3, 2014

Guest appearances
- Khloé Kardashian (guest judge); Mike Ruiz (guest photographer)

Episode chronology
← Previous "RuPaul's Big Opening"	Next → "Scream Queens"

"RuPaul's Big Opening: Part 2" is the second episode of the sixth season of the American television series RuPaul's Drag Race. It originally aired on March 3, 2014. The episode's main challenge tasks the contestants with creating outfits using themed party supplies. Khloé Kardashian is a guest judge and Mike Ruiz is a guest photographer for the mini-challenge. Bianca Del Rio wins the main challenge. Magnolia Crawford is eliminated from the competition after placing in the bottom and losing a lip-sync contest against Darienne Lake to "Turn the Beat Around" (1976) by Vicki Sue Robinson.

== Episode ==
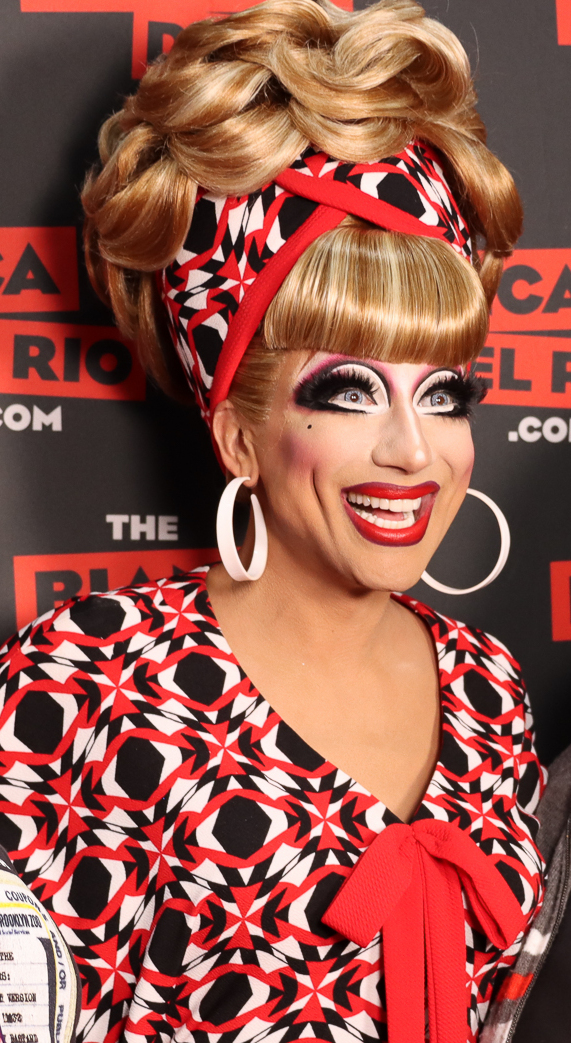
Bianca Del Rio (pictured at RuPaul's DragCon LA in 2023) wins the episode's main challenge.

The first group of contestants return to the workroom after Kelly Mantle's elimination from the competition. Gia Gunn writes a message on the mirror for the second group of contestants. On a new day, contestants from the second group enter the workroom one at a time. The contestants notice the mirror message and the leftover party supplies. RuPaul greets the contestants and explains that the first group has already competed and someone has already been eliminated. RuPaul then reveals that someone from the second group will be eliminated before the two groups merge.

For the mini-challenge, the contestants are tasked with participating in a photo shoot featuring a pillow fight with members of the Pit Crew, including Shawn Morales. Mike Ruiz is the guest photographer. After RuPaul reviews the photographs, Trinity K. Bonet is declared the winner of the mini-challenge. RuPaul then reveals the main challenge, which tasks the contestants with creating a haute couture outfit using themed party supplies. As the winner of the mini-challenge, Trinity K. Bonet is tasked with assigning party themes to each contestant. Following are the contests and party themes:

- Bianca Del Rio – Luau Party
- Courtney Act – Republican Party
- Darienne Lake – St. Patrick's Day Party
- Joslyn Fox – Quinceañera
- Magnolia Crawford – Hoedown
- Milk – Toga Party
- Trinity K. Bonet – Princess Party

The contestants unbox their party materials and begin to create their outfits. RuPaul returns to the workroom to meet with each contestant, asking questions and offering advice. Before leaving, RuPaul reveals that Khloé Kardashian is a guest judge. On elimination day, the contestants make final preparations in the workroom for the fashion show. On the main stage, RuPaul welcomes fellow judges Michelle Visage and Santino Rice, as well as guest judge Kardashian. RuPaul reveals the assignment, then the fashion show commences. After the contestants present their looks, the judges deliver their critiques, deliberate, then share the results with the group. Bianca Del Rio, Milk, and Trinity K. Bonet receive positive critiques, and Bianca Del Rio wins the challenge. Darienne Lake, Joslyn Fox, and Magnolia Crawford receive negative critiques, and Joslyn Fox is deemed safe. Darienne Lake and Magnolia Crawford place in the bottom and face off in a lip-sync contest to "Turn the Beat Around" (1976) by Vicki Sue Robinson. Darienne Lake wins the lip-sync and Magnolia Crawford is eliminated from the competition. At the end of the episode, the two groups merge in the workroom.

== Production and broadcast ==
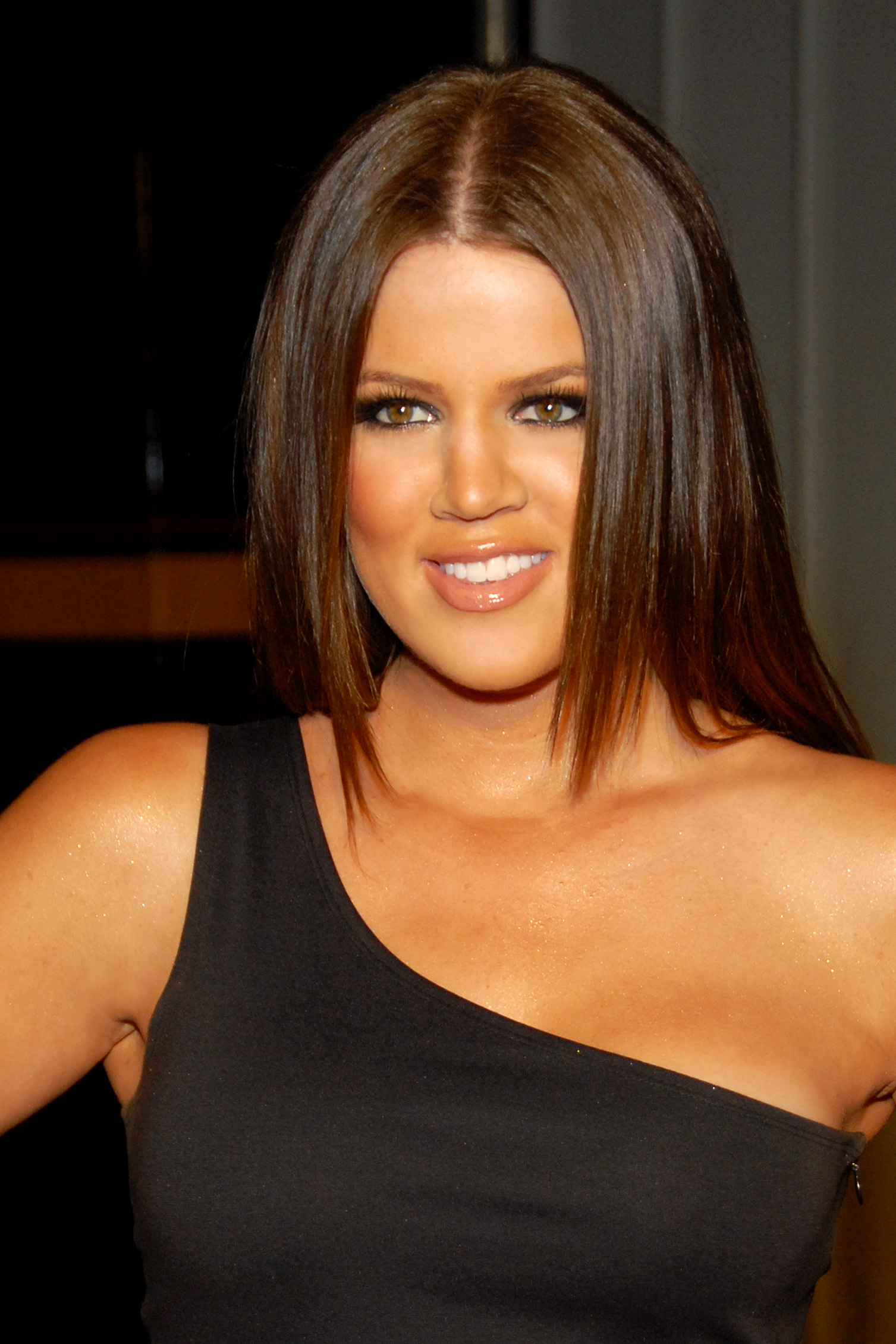
Khloé Kardashian (pictured in 2009) is a guest judge.

The episode originally aired on March 3, 2014. Darienne Lake's performance during the lip-sync contest was "full of hand-jives and face-face-face". Magnolia Crawford did not know the lyrics to the song.

=== Fashion ===
For her entrance look, Bianca Del Rio's dress is black, red, and white. Trinity K. Bonet's outfit is black. Joslyn Fox wears a short dress with an animal print. Milk has a red jacket, black leggings and shoes, and a black hat. Magnolia Crawford has a black-and-white outfit with gold jewelry and a blonde wig. Courtney Act wears a short dress with matching shoes, large gold earrings, and a blonde wig. Darienne Lake has a blue dress with matching earrings and a red wig.

For the fashion show, Trinity K. Bonet's outfit is silver and has a large collar; she also wears a tiara. Biana Del Rio has a colorful dress and she carries a drink in a coconut shell. Darienne Lake's outfit has a black bottom and a green top. Magnolia Crawford's outfit has a cow print and she wears a red shoes and a large blonde wig. Joslyn Fox has a colorful outfit and a flower bouquet. Courtney Act has a blue outfit with matching shoes and a long blonde wig. Milk has a white outfit, black shoes, a headpiece, and a beard.

== Reception ==
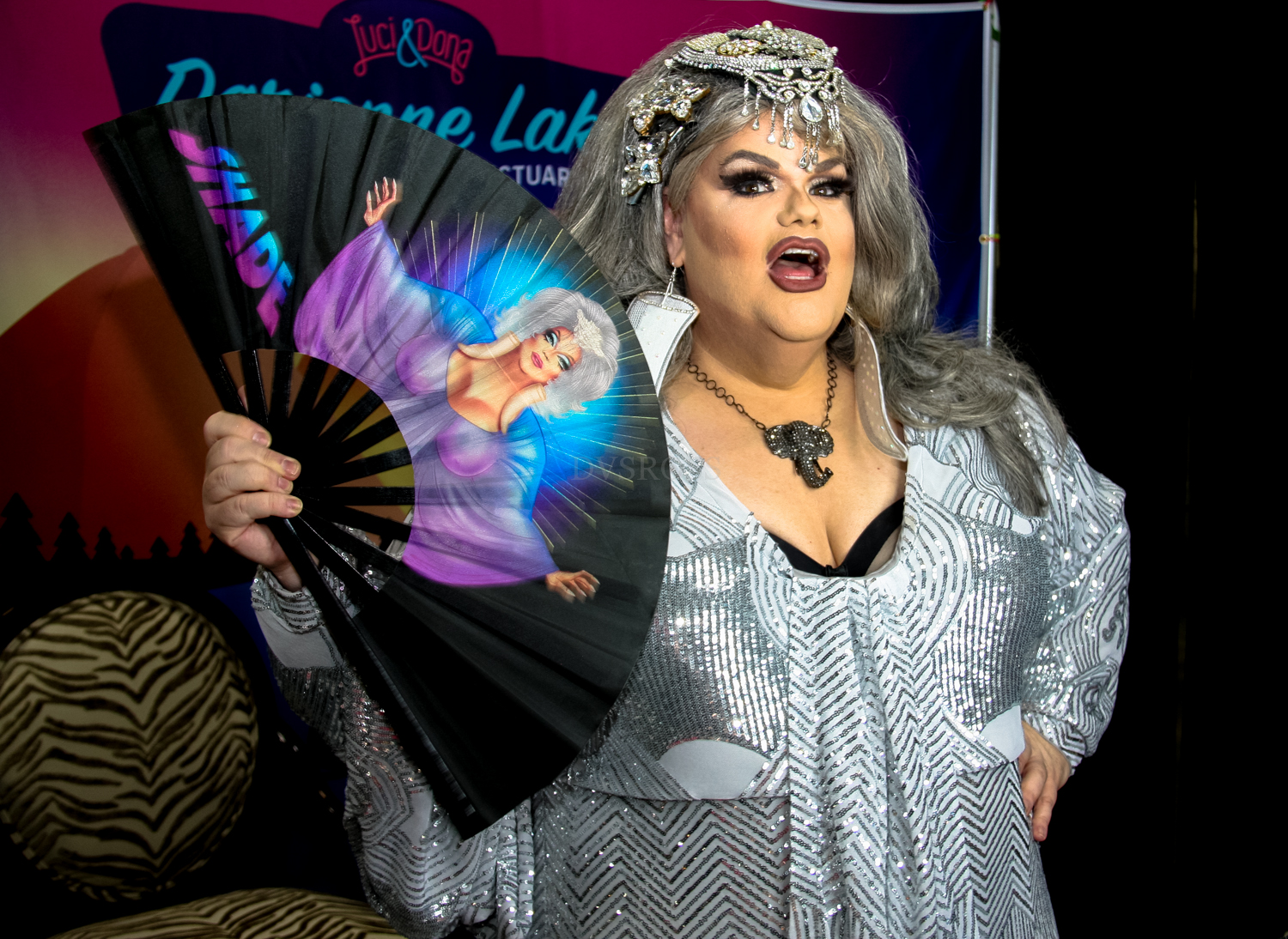
Darienne Lake (pictured at RuPaul's DragCon LA in 2019) wins the episode's lip-sync contest.

Oliver Sava of The A.V. Club gave the episode a rating of 'A'. Mariana Fernandes included Milk in Screen Rant's list of ten "design challenge runner-ups that should have won" and said, "[Bianca Del Rio] looked great, but Milk looked better. The addition of facial hair was iconic and the first piece of evidence that this tall glass of Milk had a very specific identity and style that simply couldn't be replicated. She deserved this win, and we're still salty about it." The website's Sara McCreery included Magnolia Crawford in a 2023 list of the show's ten "worst losers", based on the episode.

Jeremy Feist of Xtra Magazine said Darienne Lake "destroyed" Magnolia Crawford, writing: "It's not even a contest. Magnolia doesn't even know the words, which is weird since 'Turn the Beat Around' is practically an instructional song. Anyway, she loses and no one feels bad about it." Gregory Rosebrugh of IndieWire wrote, "Even before 'Turn the Beat Around' was over Magnolia had this 'I'm fucked' look on her face. It was all really disappointing, and I am now stumped as to how Magnolia made it into the top fourteen." Kevin O'Keeffe ranked the performance number 78 in INTO Magazine's 2018 "definitive ranking" of the show's lip-sync contests to date. Sam Brooks ranked the performance number 149 in The Spinoff's 2019 "definitive ranking" of the show's 162 lip-syncs to date.
