= Sheryl Lee Ralph filmography =

The following is a select filmography of American actress Sheryl Lee Ralph.

== Filmography ==
=== Film ===
Year	Title	Role	Notes
1977	A Piece of the Action	Barbara Hanley	
1988	Oliver & Company	Rita (voice)	
1989	The Mighty Quinn	Lola Quinn	
1989	Skin Deep	Receptionist	
1990	To Sleep with Anger	Linda	
1992	Mistress	Beverly	
1992	The Distinguished Gentleman	Miss Loretta	
1993	Sister Act 2: Back in the Habit	Florence Watson	
1994	The Flintstones	Mrs. Reneè Pyrite	
1995	White Man's Burden	Roberta Wellison	
1995	Lover's Knot	Charlotte Lee	
1996	Bogus	Ruth Clark	
1997	Jamaica Beat	Sylvia Jones	
1998	The Easter Story Keepers	Risa (voice)	Video
1998	Secrets	-	Short
1999	Personals	Chantal Jones	
1999	Unconditional Love	Linda Cray	
1999	Deterrence	Gayle Redford	
2000	Lost in the Pershing Point Hotel	Nurse Betty Redford	
2007	Frankie D	Mama D	
2010	The Cost of Heaven	Paulette Randolph	
2010	Blessed and Cursed	Lady Elise Wright	Also executive producer
2012	Christmas in Compton	Abuta	
2017	Just Getting Started	Roberta	
2018	Step Sisters	Yvonne Bishop	
2018	No Sleep 'Til Christmas	Mrs Wright	
2020	The Comeback Trail	Bess Jones	
2021	Prepared	Dr. Richards	Short
2023	The Young Wife	Angelique	
2024	The Fabulous Four	Kitty	Also executive producer
2025	Ricky	Joanne	
TBA	Octet †	Paula	Filming

=== Television ===
Year	Title	Role	Notes
1978	Baa Baa Black Sheep	Elizabeth	Episode: "A Little Bit of England"
1978	A.E.S. Hudson Street	Nurse	Episode: "Shut Down"
1978	Husbands, Wives & Lovers	Joelle	Episode: "Murray Gets Sacked and Paula Gets Hired"
1978	Good Times	Vanessa Blake	Episode: "J.J and the Plumber's Helper"
1978	The Krofft Comedy Hour	Various Characters	Television film
1979	Wonder Woman	Bobbie	Episode: "The Starships Are Coming"
1979	The Jeffersons	Jeanie	Episode: "Louise's Convention"
1982	The Neighborhood	Doris Campbell	Television film
1983	The Jerry Lewis MDA Labor Day Telethon	Herself	Episode: "1983"
1983	Search for Tomorrow	Laura McCarthy	Regular cast
1984	V: The Series	Glenna	Episode: "The Overload"
1985	Code Name: Foxfire	Maggie Bryan	Main cast
1985	Miss Universe 1985	Herself	Judge
1986	Hunter	Josie Clifford	Episode: "The Return of Typhoon Thompson"
1986	Pros and Cons	Roberta	Television film
1986–89	It's a Living	Ginger St. James	Main cast (season 4-6)
1987	Wordplay	Herself/Celebrity Panelist	Recurring guest
1987	L.A. Law	Renee Quintana	Episode: "Beef Jerky"
1987	Amazing Stories	Show Singer	Episode: "Gershwin's Trunk"
1987	Sister Margaret and the Saturday Night Ladies	Corelle	Television film
1988	Family Feud	Herself/Celebrity Contestant	Episode: "All Star Special: Funny Women vs. Funny Men Game 1-3"
1990	Falcon Crest	Mooshy Tucker	Recurring cast (season 9)
1990	New Attitude	Vicki St. James	Main cast
1991	The Gambler Returns: The Luck of the Draw	Miss Rosalee	Television film
1992	An Evening at the Improv	Herself/Host	Episode: "Episode #9.6"
1992–93	Designing Women	Etienne Toussaint Bouvier	Recurring cast (season 7)
1993	No Child of Mine	Marjorie Duncan	Television film
1993–94	George	Maggie Foster	Main cast
1994	Witch Hunt	Hypolita Laveau Kropotkin	Television film
1994–96	Soul Train	Herself/Guest Host	2 episodes
1995	Street Gear	Sarah Davis	Main cast
1996–2001	Moesha	Deidra "Dee" Mitchell (née Moss)	Main cast (season 1-5), recurring cast (season 6)
1997	Wild On!	Herself	Episode: "Wild on Jamaica"
1997–2000	Recess	Mrs. LaSalle (voice)	Guest cast (season 1 & 4)
1998	The Wild Thornberrys	Lioness #2 (voice)	Episode: "Flood Warning"
1999	The Directors	Herself	Episode: "The Films of Norman Jewison"
1999	Sabrina, the Teenage Witch	Zsa Zsa Goowhiggie	Episode: "What Price Harvey?"
1999	The Parkers	Dee Mitchell	Episode: "Daddy's Girl"
1999–2001	Hollywood Squares	Herself/Panelist	Recurring guest
2000–01	The District	Lt. Dee Banks	Recurring cast (season 1)
2001	The Test	Herself/Panelist	Episode: "The Stripper Test"
2001	The Jennie Project	Dr. Pamela Prentiss	Television film
2002	Justice League	Cheetah/Barbara Ann Minerva (voice)	Episode: "Injustice for All"
2002	The Proud Family	Diana Parker (voice)	Guest cast (season 1-2)
2002–03	Static Shock	Trina Jessup (voice)	Recurring cast (season 2)
2003	Whoopi	Florence	Episode: "She Ain't Heavy, She's My Partner"
2003	Las Vegas	Janet Ellis	Episode: "Luck Be a Lady"
2004	Justice League Unlimited	Cheetah/Barbara Ann Minerva (voice)	Episode: "Kids' Stuff"
2005	Barbershop	Claire	Recurring cast
2006	Real Life Divas	Herself	Episode: "Sheryl Lee Ralph"
2006	7th Heaven	Nurse Yvonne Rockwell	Episode: "And Baby Makes Three"
2006	ER	Gloria Gallant	Recurring cast (season 12)
2007	Exes and Ohs	Reverend Ruby	Episode: "There Must Be Rules..."
2008	Baisden After Dark	Herself	Episode: "Has Black Comedy Become a Hot Ghetto Mess?"
2008	My Super Sweet 16	Herself	Episode: "Etienne"
2008	Hannah Montana	Clarice Johnson	Episode: "We're All on This Date Together"
2009	Beverly Hills Groomer	Herself	Episode: "Grooming Up"
2010	E! True Hollywood Story	Herself	Episode: "Usher"
2010	Inside	Herself/Narrator	Episode: "Polygamy: Life in Bountiful"
2010	Running Russell Simmons	Herself	Episode: "You Only Live Once"
2010	Zevo-3	Grams (voice)	Episode: "Control"
2011, 2019	Young Justice	Amanda Waller (voice)	2 episodes
2011	Tyler Perry's House of Payne	Felicia	Episode: "The Rich and Payneless"
2012	Celebrity Wife Swap	Herself	Episode: "Niecy Nash/Tina Yothers"
2013	Life After	Herself	Episode: "Sheryl Lee Ralph: Life After Dreamgirls"
2013	Smash	Cynthia Moore	Episode: "The Song"
2013	JD Lawrence's Community Service	Carolyn	Main cast
2013–15	Instant Mom	Maggie Turner	Main cast
2013–20	Ray Donovan	Claudette Boone	Recurring cast (season 1-2 & 7)
2014	RuPaul's Drag Race	Herself/Guest Judge	Episode: "Shade: The Rusical"
2014	Oprah: Where Are They Now?	Herself	Episode: "Darva Conger, Brigitte Nielsen & Original Dreamgirl Sheryl Lee Ralph"
2014	2 Broke Girls	Genét Bromberg	Episode: "And the Not Broke Parents"
2014	One Love	Carolyn Winters	Main cast
2014	See Dad Run	Vanessa Ralph	Guest cast (season 2-3)
2014	Nicky, Ricky, Dicky & Dawn	Ms. Edin Dumont	Episode: "The Sad Tail of Gary-Chip-Tiny-Elvis-Squishy-Paws"
2015	Unsung	Herself	Episode: "Jennifer Holliday"
2016	Being	Herself	Episode: "Sheryl Lee Ralph"
2016	Unsung Hollywood	Herself	Episode: "Sheryl Lee Ralph"
2016	Criminal Minds	Hayden Montgomery	Recurring cast (season 11)
2017	Brunch with Tiffany	Herself	Episode: "Episode Two: Sheryl Lee Ralph"
2017	One Mississippi	Felicia Hollingsworth	Recurring cast (season 2)
2017	Christmas at Holly Lodge	Nadine	Television film
2017–19	MacGyver	Mama Emma Colton	Guest cast (season 1-3)
2018	We Are Washington	Herself	Episode: "The Wedding Experience & Groom and Grub"
2018	The Quad	Ula Pettiway	Recurring cast (season 2)
2018	Claws	Matilde Ruval	Recurring cast (season 2)
2018	No Sleep 'Til Christmas	Mrs. Wright	Television film
2019	Diva Defined	Herself/Host	Main host
2019	Fam	Rose	Main cast
2019	A Black Lady Sketch Show	Asia's Mother	Episode: "3rd & Bonaparte Is Always in the Shade"
2019	Christmas Hotel	Marnie	Television film
2020	Fashionably Yours	Janet	Television film
2020	Christmas Comes Twice	Miss Nelson	Television film
2020–22	Motherland: Fort Salem	President Kelly Wade	Recurring cast
2021	History of the Sitcom	Herself	Recurring guest
2021	Christmas in My Heart	Ruthie Sampson	Television film
2021–present	Abbott Elementary	Barbara Howard	Main cast
2022	Soul of a Nation	Herself	Episode: "X / o n e r a t e d – The Murder of Malcolm X and 55 Years to Justice"
2022	Celebrity Family Feud	Herself/Contestant	Episode: "Abbott Elementary vs. Hacks and Kal Penn vs. Erika Christensen"
2022	How We Roll	Loretta	Episode: "The Big Secret"
2023	Celebrity Wheel of Fortune	Herself/Contestant	Episode: "Janelle James, Sheryl Lee Ralph and Chris Perfetti"
2023	Praise Petey	Boss (voice)	Episode: "Taxi to the South!"
2023	Young Love	Additional voices	2 episodes
2023	Bob's Burgers	Esmeralda (voice)	Episode: "The Amazing Rudy"
2025	It's Always Sunny in Philadelphia	Barbara Howard	Crossover episode: "The Gang F****s Up Abbott Elementary"
2025	Big City Greens	Suzette Blair (voice)	Episode: "Short Wait"
2025	Weather Hunters	Ms. Joyce (voice)	Main cast

=== Documentary ===
Year	Title	Role	Notes
2011	Kiss and Tell: The History of Black Romance in Movie	Narrator	
2016	Struggle and Triumph: The Legacy of George Washington Carver	Narrator	Short

=== Theater ===
Year	Title	Role	Notes
1980	Swing	Helen	
1980	Reggae	Faith	Original Broadway production
1981	Dreamgirls	Deena Jones	Original Broadway production
2002	Thoroughly Modern Millie	Muzzy Van Hossmere	Original Broadway production
2016–17	Wicked	Madame Morrible	Replacement
2021	Goosebumps The Musical	Miss Walker	Original studio cast recording
2021	Thoughts of a Colored Man		Producer; Original Broadway production
2022	Ohio State Murders		Producer; Original Broadway production

=== Video games ===
Year	Title	Voice role	Notes
2010	BioShock 2	Grace Holloway	
