= Ilya (band) =

English musical duo

- Origin: Bristol, England
- Genres: Trip hop; electronica; downtempo; indie folk
- Years active: 2003–present
- Labels: Virgin Records; Universal Records
- Members: Joanna Swan; Nick Pullin
- Past members: Dan Brown
- Website: http://www.ilyasounds.com/

Ilya are a duo from Bristol, England. The band consists of Joanna Swan and Nick Pullin.

The band released their debut album They Died for Beauty in 2004, receiving a massive critical acclaim. It was followed by Somerset in 2006, after the departure from major company Virgin Records. The pair has been self-producing most of their music ever since then, in their home studio near Bristol.

Ilya have often been compared to Zero 7 and other post-2000 downtempo acts, whilst also being considered as continuing the trip hop tradition, originated in Bristol in the 1990s.

The third Ilya album, Hootchi Cootchi, was released early 2007, through online orders only. But due to its very different sound, which explores a rougher, sometimes darker, and definitely more electronic and experimental side of Ilya, the pair decided to release it under the name Jo Swan, so as not to disturb early fans, used to the jazzy Ilya sound.

Still in 2007, Joanna Swan from Ilya has recorded an album with Belgian female artist Lunabee. Eventually released in November 2007 after a few months of postponing, it was simply titled Lunabee & Swan, and was also only available by mail orders. That same year, Joanna Swan wrote lyrics and recorded voices for an album with French composer Francois-Elie Roulin, "Alien Robots Orchestra". It was first digitally released in France on 11 September 2008.

The fourth album (but the third one as Ilya), Carving Heads on Cherry Stones, was released on CD on 23 June 2009 and exclusively sold through the band's website. Digital release followed next September. On this 10-track album, the music goes in a more abstract and rugged direction, focusing on voice and guitar.

Before the digital release of the All Around My Heart 4-track EP (21 April 2010), an exclusive track (Carrion Crows) was given away to fans through the Ilya mailing list. The duet announced the making of a new album, to be released during autumn 2010, possibly containing a couple of tracks from the EP. Another project is in talks, involving Dan Brown, the third Ilya member during the making of 'They Died For Beauty'.

On 14 September 2010, Jo Swan released, under her own name, a 17-track compilation album, Songs From the 90's (A Retrospective of Previously Unreleased Recordings). Digital release only. An extra live track (In Timeless Light) is offered to fans to announce this release.

The fifth Ilya album, Fathoms Deep, is being released on 12 January 2012 (digital only).

Financing the sixth album (titled Blind as Hope) went through a crowdfunding process, as the band opted for a more ambitious – and somewhat more expensive – orchestral sound. Recording was done during late Summer 2013. A few months later, singer Joanna Swan requested from the pledgers to volunteer for backing vocals on one track, Blind as Hope, by sending their home-recorded parts. The album was first sent to crowdfunding backers on 31 March 2014.

Ilya's seventh album, Gospel, an obvious return to lounge atmospheric jazz that was the trademark of their early sound, was digitally released on 10 May 2016 by the band itself, through an announcement on their Facebook page. The opening song "Running for Superman" had been given away as a free download in November 2015. The band had then announced the forthcoming release of a collection of 11 songs. Eventually, Gospel featured 10 songs.

== Trivia ==
The song Bellissimo was used by Revlon in their advertising, as well as in the French TV commercial for Cacharel perfume "Amor, Amor".

Martin Freeman from The Office and Lena Headey from Game of Thrones are featured in the Bellissimo music video.

Soleil Soleil, from Ilya's first album, can be heard in the film Mr Brooks, starring Kevin Costner, William Hurt and Demi Moore.

== Discography ==
=== Albums ===
- 2003 They Died for Beauty (Virgin Records)
- 2006 Somerset (Universal Records)
- 2007 Hootchi Cootchi (Chrysalis Music) (released under the name Jo Swan)
- 2009 Carving Heads on Cherry Stones (Chrysalis Music)
- 2010 Songs From the 90's (A Retrospective of Previously Unreleased Recordings) (Ilya Sounds) (under the name Jo Swan)
- 2012 Fathoms Deep (Ilyasounds)
- 2014 Blind as Hope (Ilyasounds)
- 2016 Gospel (Ilyasounds)

=== Singles/EPs ===
- 2003 The Revelation EP (Virgin Records)
- 2004 Bellissimo (Virgin Records)
- 2004 Bliss (Virgin Records)
- 2004 Soleil Soleil (Virgin Records)
- 2010 All Around My Heart (Ilyasounds)
- 2015 Kaleidoscopes (Ilyasounds)
- 2016 2 Songs (Ilyasounds)
- 2018 In My Other Life (Bandcamp Compilation of all Patreon releases from April 2017/18)

== See also ==
- Trip hop
