= They Died for Beauty =

Studio album by Ilya
- Released: 11 May 2004
- Genre: Trip hop; electronica; downtempo; indie folk
- Length: 49:16
- Label: Virgin
- Producer: Ilya

Ilya chronology
They Died for Beauty (2004)	Somerset (2006)

Professional ratings
Review scores
Source	Rating
AllMusic	3.5/5 stars
BBC Music	(positive)

They Died for Beauty is the debut studio album by English trip hop band Ilya. The album was released on 11 May 2004 via Virgin Records.

== Track listing ==
No.	Title	Length
1.	"Bellissimo"	5:02
2.	"Quattra Neon"	5:26
3.	"Bliss"	4:03
4.	"Heavenly"	5:19
5.	"Soleil Soleil"	6:18
6.	"Pretty Baby"	5:03
7.	"All for Melody"	4:39
8.	"Happy and Weak"	8:15
9.	"They Died for Beauty"	5:11
Total length:		49:16
