= April Carrión =

Puerto Rican drag performer

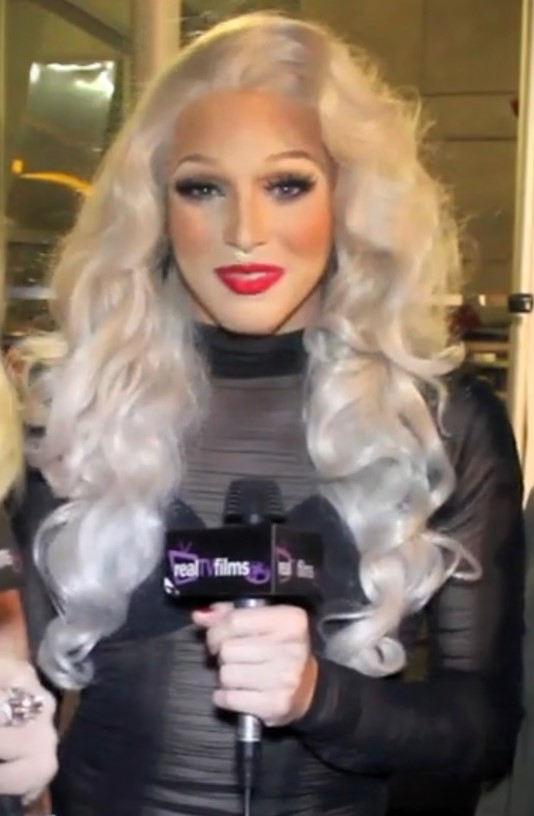
- April Carrión in 2014
- Born: Jason Carrión; April 23, 1989 (age 37); Guaynabo, Puerto Rico
- Education: School of Plastic Arts and Design of Puerto Rico (BFA)
- Television: RuPaul's Drag Race (season 6)

April Carrión is the stage name of Jason Carrión (born April 23, 1989), a Puerto Rican drag queen and television personality best known for their appearances on the sixth season of RuPaul's Drag Race and the eleventh season of RuPaul's Drag Race All Stars.

== Early life ==
Carrión was born in Guaynabo, Puerto Rico on April 23, 1989. They are the youngest of three brothers- all of whom are gay. In 2007, they attended the School of Plastic Arts and Design of Puerto Rico, where they earned a bachelor's degree. They started doing drag when they were 20 years old. The name April Carrión comes from the month they were born and their last name.

== Career ==
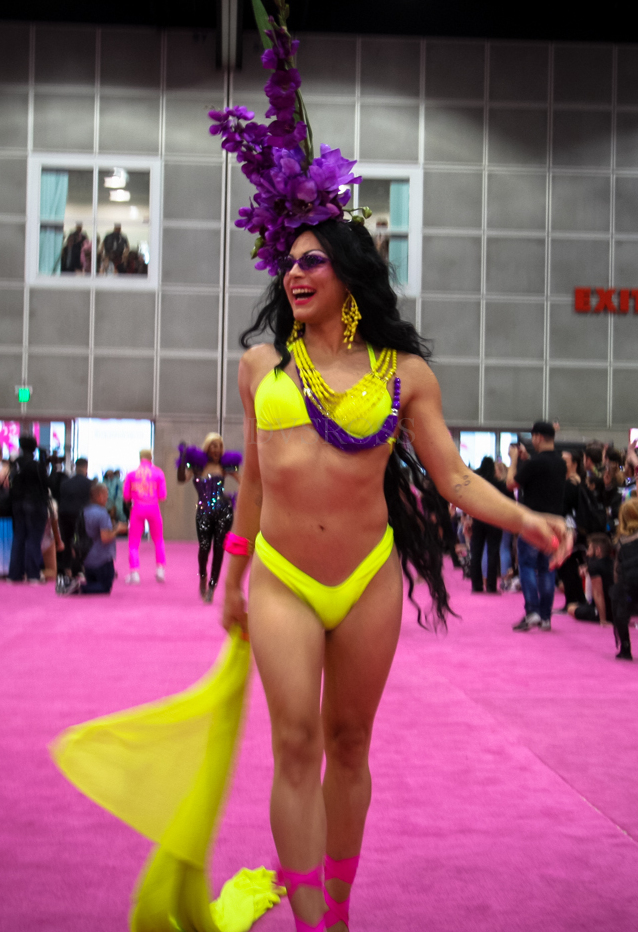
Carrión in 2019

Carrión was the winner of the Miss Krash Puerto Rico pageant in 2011. They won a pageant with one of the prizes being in a Gloria Estefan music video. Carrión appeared in Estefan's "Hotel Nacional" in 2012.

They were announced as one of fourteen contestants for the sixth season of RuPaul's Drag Race in February 2014. On the show, Carrión beat Vivacious in a lip-sync to Selena Gomez’s "Shake It Up" and was eliminated on the following episode (placing eleventh overall). After being eliminated, Carrion posted photos on social media of their runway looks had they remained in the competition, the first Drag Race alumni to do so. In 2018, Bowen Yang and Matt Rogers of Vulture.com ranked one of Carrión's runway looks on the show number 58 in a list of "The 100 Greatest RuPaul’s Drag Race Looks of All Time".

In 2020, Out said: "Carrion made an impression on season six of RuPaul's Drag Race. The Puerto Rican performer didn't make it far, but it wasn't for lack of talent: her season was inarguably one of the strongest in terms of casting. It was packed with the likes of Courtney Act, Bianca Del Rio, and Bendelacreme. In fact, the lip sync that sent her home has gone down in Drag Race herstory as one of the most iconic given that it was against the show's true lip-sync assassin Trinity K. Bonet. And when you watch Carrion in the footage, she still puts on quite a show."

Outside of Drag Race, Carrión was with other alumni for an episode of Skin Wars. Carrión was one of the stars of the 2014 Puerto Rican LGBT documentary Mala Mala. In September 2018, they were a guest judge for an episode of the Mexican drag reality show "Versus Drag Queens". Carrión appeared in the music video for Residente's "Banana Papaya" in November 2018.

Carrión appeared in Jennifer Lopez's performance at the 2022 iHeartRadio Music Awards.

In April 2026, Carrión was announced to be competing on the eleventh season of RuPaul's Drag Race All Stars in the second bracket. Her season 6 castmate Vivacious, whom Carrión sent home, is also competing in the same bracket.

== Personal life ==
Carrión came out as being genderqueer in 2016.

== Filmography ==
=== Film ===
Year	Title	Role
2014	Mala Mala	Themselves

=== Television ===
Year	Title	Role	Notes
2014	RuPaul's Drag Race	Themselves	Contestant (11th place)
2014	RuPaul's Drag Race: Untucked	Themselves	
2016	Skin Wars	Themselves	
2018	Versus Drag Queens	Themselves	Judge
2026	RuPaul's Drag Race All Stars season 11	Themselves	Contestant

=== Music videos ===
Year	Title	Artist
2012	"Hotel Nacional"	Gloria Estefan
2014	"Sexy Drag Queen" (RuPaul Cover)	Themselves
2018	"Banana Papaya"	Residente
