= Vivacious (drag queen) =

Drag performer

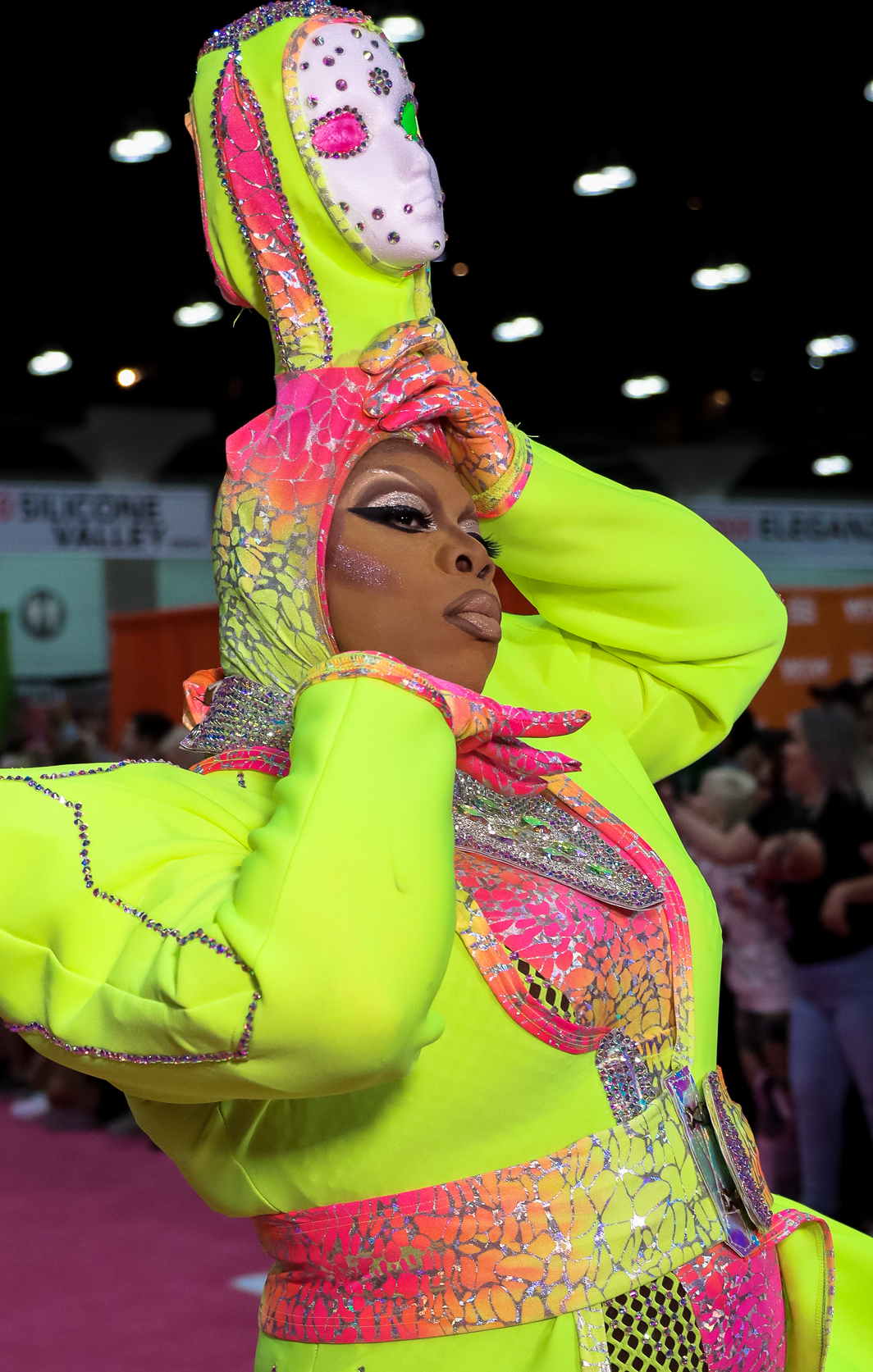
- Vivacious at RuPaul's DragCon LA, 2023 with Ornacia
- Born: Osmond Scott Jr. Jamaica
- Other name: Osmond Vacious
- Occupations: Drag queen; singer; television personality
- Years active: 1990s–present
- Television: RuPaul's Drag Race (season 6)

Vivacious is the stage name of Osmond Scott Jr., a Jamaican-American drag queen who is best known for appearing on the sixth season of RuPaul's Drag Race and eleventh season of RuPaul's Drag Race All Stars. She is known for being one of the original Club Kids, a group of New York City dance club personalities in the late 1980s and early 1990s.

== Early life ==
Scott was born in Jamaica. He moved to New York City at age 7. He got the name of his drag persona Vivacious from his 2nd grade teacher, named Ms. Bright, who would call Scott "Mr. Vivacious".

Vivacious started as one of the original Club Kids in New York City during the 1990s, performing at clubs such as The Limelight, Tunnel, and The Sound Factory.

== Career ==
Vivacious was announced to be on the sixth season of RuPaul's Drag Race in 2014. She "made one of the most unforgettable first episode entrances in Drag Race herstory," according to The Advocate, by wearing an outfit featuring a second head Vivacious called Ornacia.

In 2015, Sadie Gennis of TV Guide ranked Vivacious number 22 in her list of the 24 "best RuPaul's Drag Race entrances of all time", and Time Out's Ethan LaCroix and Jillian Anthony ranked her number eleven on their list of the best Drag Race contestants from New York City. Vivacious ranked number 91 in Vulture's list of the 100 "greatest RuPaul's Drag Race looks of all time". She was eliminated in the third episode of the show, after losing a lip sync to "Shake It Up" by Selena Gomez against April Carrión.

In 2019, Vivacious said "gender politics heavily influenced the show, and that the show favors the more feminine queens", according to Sarah Beauchamp of Screen Rant, who wrote, "Since Vivacious' looks are a little more masculine and always unique - rarely the typical beauty queen-esque style seen on the show - she felt she didn't appeal to the Middle American audience." Vivacious' Ornacia head was referenced in an episode of the third season of RuPaul's Drag Race All Stars. Vivacious appeared on the premiere of season fifteen of RuPaul's Drag Race. Guest judge Ariana Grande also arrived wearing an outfit referencing Vivacious and Ornacia.

Vivacious was featured on Brandon Morales' 2014 EP, called Pride EP. She released her first solo single, "Ornacia", on October 6, 2017. Vivacious was one of 30 drag queens featured in Miley Cyrus' performance of "Dooo It!" at the 2015 MTV Video Music Awards. She was also one of several drag queens appearing in Katy Perry's live performance of "Swish Swish", on Saturday Night Live in May 2017. Vivacious was featured in two videos for Elle's YouTube channel, doing a reverse drag transformation and giving advice to a child drag queen in 2017.

In April 2026, Vivacious was confirmed to be competing on the eleventh season of RuPaul's Drag Race All Stars in the second bracket. Her season 6 castmate April Carrión, who sent Vivacious home, is also competing in the same bracket.

== Personal life ==
Scott is based in New York City as of 2015, where he frequently DJs and performs.

== Discography ==
=== Extended play ===
Title	Details	Ref.
Pride EP with Brandon Morales	Released: March 12, 2014; Label: Sheeva Records	

=== Singles ===
Title	Year	Album
"Ornacia"	2017	—N/a

== Filmography ==
=== Television ===
Year	Title	Role
2014	RuPaul's Drag Race (season 6)	Herself/Contestant (twelfth place)
2014	RuPaul's Drag Race: Untucked	Herself/Contestant (twelfth place)
2015	MTV Video Music Awards	Backup dancer
2017	Saturday Night Live	Backup dancer
2023	RuPaul's Drag Race (season 15)	Herself/Special guest
2026	RuPaul's Drag Race All Stars (season 11)	Herself/Contestant

== See also ==
- LGBTQ culture in New York City
- List of LGBTQ people from New York City
