= Leading Ladies (group) =

British-American girl group

- Origin: London, England
- Genres: Musical theatre; Show tunes; pop
- Years active: 2017–2018
- Labels: East West Records; Warner Music
- Past members: Amber Riley; Beverley Knight; Cassidy Janson
- Website: leadingladiesmusic.com

The Leading Ladies was a British-American girl group/supergroup formed in London, England, in 2017. The group consists of three leading women from the London West End stage; American singer and actress Amber Riley, who starred in Dreamgirls, British soul singer Beverley Knight, who featured in The Bodyguard, Memphis and Cats and British theatre star Cassidy Janson, who took the leading role in Beautiful: The Carole King Musical.

== Formation ==
The idea for forming Leading Ladies came after Beverley Knight was approached by her label East West to record a musicals themed album. She was not sold on the idea of recording a solo album of show songs and turned down the idea. Knight subsequently formed Leading Ladies as she wanted to try something new after having a health scare, which resulted in her having a hysterectomy. After watching both Riley promoting Dreamgirls on The Graham Norton Show and Janson performing in Beautiful: The Carole King Musical, Knight asked East West to approach both women with the offer of recording an album together. Riley and Janson both agreed and the group was formed and signed to East West/Warner Music.

== Debut album: Songs from the Stage ==
The Leading Ladies' debut album Songs from the Stage was released on 17 November 2017. The album features fourteen songs from musicals including Hamilton, Cats, Rent, Dreamgirls, Funny Girl, The Bodyguard, Memphis and Beautiful: The Carole King Musical. Songs from the Stage was produced by Grammy Award-winning British producer Brian Rawling, who has previously worked with Cher, Tina Turner and Lionel Richie. The setting-up of the music and vocal arrangements were done together as a group, while most of the recording occurred separately within a two-week period due to their busy individual schedules. During the album recording, Riley and Janson were still both contracted to perform in the West End, while Knight was recovering from surgery and due to go on her I Love Soulsville UK tour.

"One Night Only" (originally from the musical Dreamgirls) was released as the group's debut single on 6 October 2017. The song peaked on the A-list at BBC Radio 2. "Songs from the Stage" debuted within the top 20 of the UK Albums Chart and the Scottish Albums Chart.

The group promoted the album by performing the track "Wind Beneath My Wings" on BBC Children in Need and "I'm Every Woman" on Strictly Come Dancing. The second single from the album was revealed on 27 November 2017 to be a double A-side single of "I'm Every Woman" from The Bodyguard and "Have Yourself a Merry Little Christmas" from Meet Me in St. Louis.

Since the release of Songs From the Stage, there have been no further projects from the group.

== Members ==
- Amber Riley (2017-2018)
- Beverley Knight (2017-2018)
- Cassidy Janson (2017-2018)

== Discography ==
The discography of the British-American girl group Leading Ladies consists of one studio album and two singles.

=== Studio albums ===
Title	Details	Peak chart positions	
Title	Details	UK	SCO
Songs from the Stage	Released: 17 November 2017 (UK); Labels: East West, Warner; Format: CD, digital download, streaming	19	19

=== Singles ===
Single	Year	Album
"One Night Only"	2017	Songs from the Stage
"I'm Every Woman" / "Have Yourself a Merry Little Christmas"	2017	Songs from the Stage

==== Promotional singles ====
Single	Year	Album
"Will You Love Me Tomorrow"	2017	Songs from the Stage
"Somebody to Love"	2017	Songs from the Stage

== Awards and nominations ==
Year	Association	Category	Nominated work	Result
2018	Classic Brit Awards	Album of the Year	Songs from the Stage	Nominated
