= Songs from the Stage =

Studio album by Leading Ladies
- Released: 17 November 2017
- Genre: Musical theatre, show tunes, pop
- Length: 49:53
- Label: East West; Warner
- Producer: Brian Rawling; Paul Meehan

Singles from Songs from the Stage
- 1. "One Night Only" Released: 6 October 2017; 2. "I'm Every Woman / Have Yourself a Merry Little Christmas" Released: 27 November 2017

Songs from the Stage is the debut album from British-American girl group Leading Ladies, featuring Amber Riley, Beverley Knight and Cassidy Janson. The album was released on 17 November 2017.

It was nominated for Album of the Year at the 2018 Classic Brit Awards.

== Background ==
Songs from the Stage features fourteen songs from musicals including Hamilton, Cats, Rent, Dreamgirls, Funny Girl, The Bodyguard, Memphis and Beautiful: The Carole King Musical. Songs from the Stage was produced by Grammy Award-winning British producer Brian Rawling, who has previously worked with Cher, Tina Turner and Lionel Richie. The setting-up of the music and vocal arrangements were done together as a group, while most of the recording occurred separately within a two-week period due to their busy individual schedules. During the album recording, Riley and Janson were still both contracted to perform in the West End, while Knight was recovering from surgery and due to go on her I Love Soulsville UK tour).

The group promoted the album by performing the track "Wind Beneath My Wings" on BBC Children in Need, second single "I'm Every Woman" on Strictly Come Dancing, "Somebody to Love" on The Royal Variety Show, "Have Yourself a Merry Little Christmas" on Sunday Brunch and the first single "One Night Only" on the special New Year's Eve edition of The Graham Norton Show.

== Singles ==
"One Night Only" (originally from the musical Dreamgirls) was released as the group's debut single on 6 October 2017. The song peaked on the A-list at BBC Radio 2.

The second single from the album was revealed on 27 November 2017 to be a double A-side single of "I'm Every Woman" from The Bodyguard and "Have Yourself a Merry Little Christmas" from Meet Me in St. Louis.

=== Promotional singles ===
"Will You Love Me Tomorrow" was released as the first promotional single on 20 October 2017. The second promotional single was "Somebody to Love", issued on 3 November 2017. The third and final promotional single was released one week later on 10 November 2017 and was confirmed to be "Have Yourself a Merry Little Christmas", which later became one of the album's second singles.

== Commercial performance ==
Songs from the Stage debuted within the top 20 of the UK Albums Chart and the Scottish Albums Chart.

== Track listing ==
Songs from the Stage
No.	Title	Writer(s)	Producer(s)	Length
1.	"One Night Only"	Tom Eyen; Henry Krieger	Brian Rawling; Paul Meehan	3:00
2.	"Seasons of Love"	Jonathon Larson	Rawling; Meehan	3:02
3.	"I'm Every Woman"	Valerie Simpson; Nickolas Ashford	Rawling; Meehan	4:35
4.	"(You Make Me Feel Like) A Natural Woman"	Gerry Goffin; Carole King; Jerry Wexler	Rawling; Meehan	3:14
5.	"The Wind Beneath My Wings" (Amber Riley solo)	Larry Henley; Jeff Silbar	Rawling; Meehan	4:01
6.	"Helpless" (Rap by Sky Adams)	Lin-Manuel Miranda	Rawling; Meehan	3:54
7.	"Memory"	Andrew Lloyd Webber; T. S. Eliot; Trevor Nunn	Rawling; Meehan	4:29
8.	"Somebody to Love"	Freddie Mercury	Rawling; Meehan	3:48
9.	"Falling Slowly"	Markéta Irglová; Glen Hansard	Rawling; Meehan	3:53
10.	"Love Will Stand When All Else Falls" (Beverley Knight solo)	Joe DiPietro; David Bryan	Rawling; Meehan	3:28
11.	"Raise the Roof"	Lippa	Rawling; Meehan	3:11
12.	"Will You Love Me Tomorrow"	King; Goffin	Rawling; Meehan	3:57
13.	"Don't Rain On My Parade" (Cassidy Janson solo)	Jule Styne; Bob Merrill	Rawling; Meehan	2:47
14.	"Have Yourself a Merry Little Christmas" (Amber Riley solo)	Hugh Martin; Ralph Blane	Rawling; Meehan	2:34
Total length:				49:53

== Charts ==
Chart (2017)	Peak position
Scottish Albums (OCC)	19
UK Albums (OCC)	19

== Release history ==
Region	Date	Format(s)	Label	Ref.
Various	17 November 2017	CD; digital download; streaming	East West; Warner	
