= Glamazons vs. Champions =

- RuPaul's Drag Race episode
- Episode no.: Season 4 Episode 3
- Presented by: RuPaul
- Original air date: February 13, 2012

Guest judges
- Natalie Cole; Amber Riley

Episode chronology
← Previous "WTF!: Wrestling's Trashiest Fighters"	Next → "Queens Behind Bars"
- RuPaul's Drag Race season 4

"Glamazons vs. Champions" is the third episode of the fourth season of the American television series RuPaul's Drag Race. It originally aired on February 13, 2012. The episode's main challenge tasks the contestants with producing and acting in infomercials for RuPaul's albums Champion (2009) and Glamazon (2011). Natalie Cole and Amber Riley are guest judges.

Sharon Needles wins the episode's main challenge. The Princess is eliminated from the competition after placing in the bottom and losing a lip-sync contest against DiDa Ritz to Cole's "This Will Be". DiDa Ritz's performance has been deemed among the show's best lip-syncs.

== Episode ==
The contestants return to the workroom Lashauwn Beyond's after elimination on the previous episode. RuPaul greets the group and reveals the mini-challenge, which tasks the contestants with creating hats with butterfly-shaped accessories for guest Piyah Martell, who has caudal regression syndrome. Jiggly Caliente, Kenya Michaels, and Phi Phi O'Hara win the mini-challenge. RuPaul then reveals the main challenge, which tasks the contestants with teaming up to produce and act in infomercials for RuPaul's albums Champion (2009) and Glamazon (2011). Team captains Kenya Michaels and Phi Phi O'Hara select their fellow teammates.

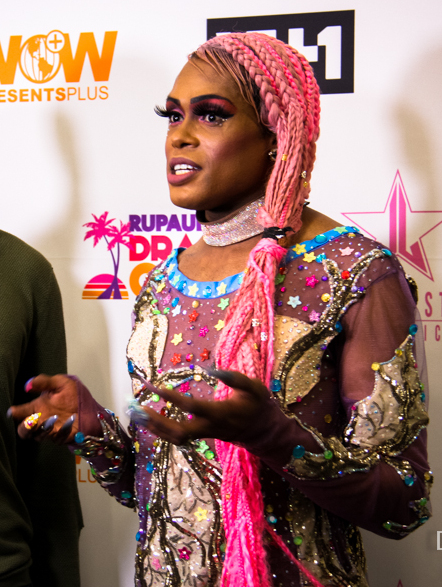
DiDa Ritz (pictured at RuPaul's DragCon LA in 2018) wins the episode's lip-sync contest.

The teams start to develop their concepts. RuPaul returns to the workroom to meet with each team, asking questions and offering advice. The teams film in front of a green screen, with help from RuPaul, Michelle Visage, and members of the Pit Crew. Team Glamazon's contestants and songs are:

- Chad Michaels – "The Beginning"
- Kenya Michaels – "Get Your Rebel On"
- Madame LaQueer – "Responsitrannity"
- Milan – "Superstar"
- The Princess – "If I Dream"
- Willam – "Click Clack (Make Dat Money)"

Team Champion's contestants and songs are:

- DiDa Ritz – "Main Event"
- Jiggly Caliente – "LadyBoy"
- Latrice Royale – "Never Go Home Again"
- Phi Phi O'Hara – "Jealous of My Boogie"
- Sharon Needles – "Cover Girl (Put the Bass in Your Walk)"

On elimination day, the contestants make final preparations for the fashion show. On the main stage, RuPaul welcomes fellow judges Visage and Santino Rice, as well as guest judges Natalie Cole and Amber Riley. RuPaul shares the assignment of the main challenge and the runway category ("Platinum and Gold"), then the fashion show commences. After the contestants present their looks, the judges and contestants watch the infomercials. The judges then deliver their critiques, deliberate, then share the results with the group. Sharon Needles is declared the winner of the main challenge. DiDa Ritz and The Princess place in the bottom and face off in a lip-sync contest to Cole's song "This Will Be" (1975). DiDa Ritz wins the lip-sync and The Princess is eliminated from the competition. The Princess returns to the workroom to leave a message on the mirror for the remaining contestants.

== Production and broadcast ==
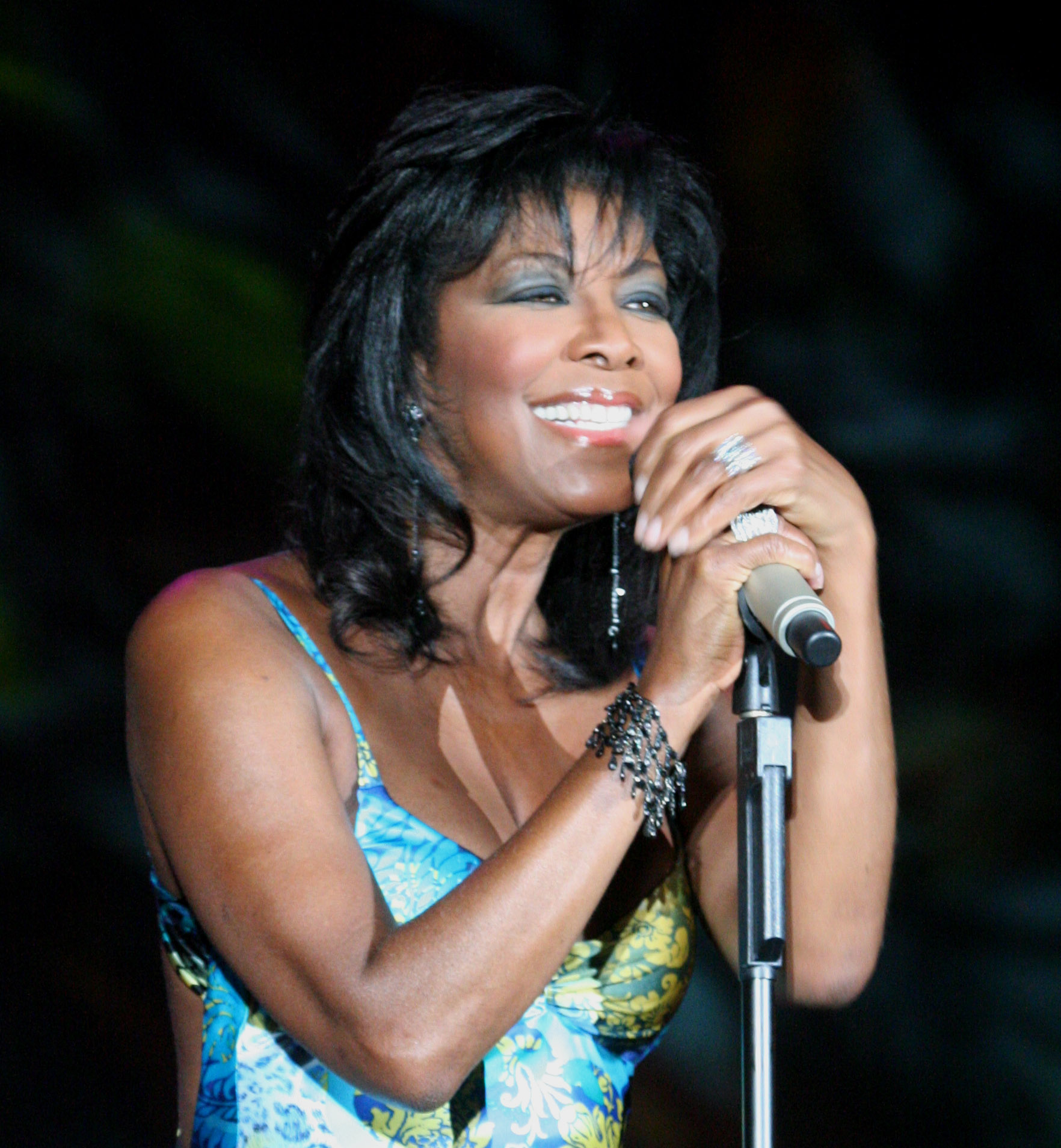
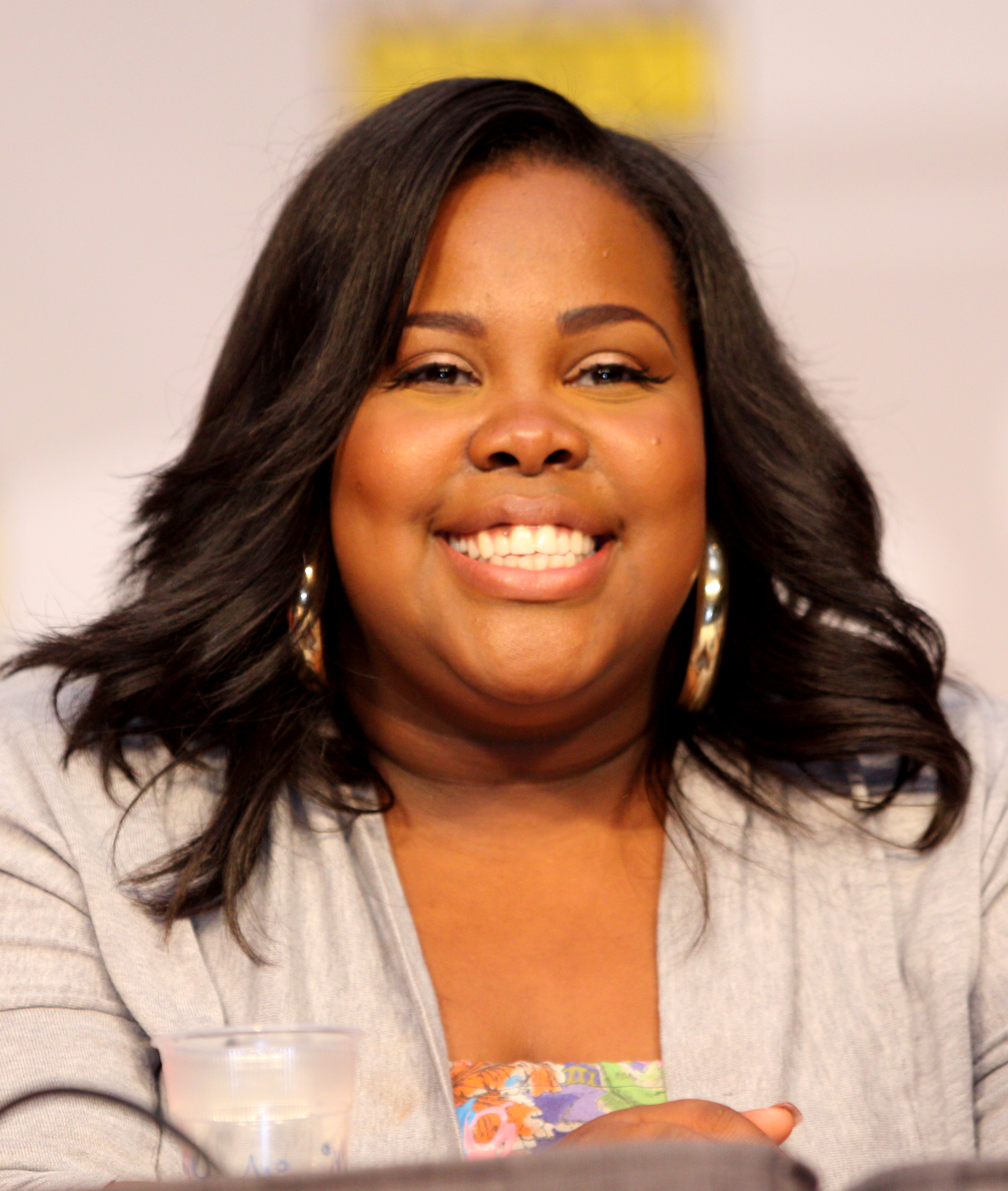
Natalie Cole (top) and Amber Riley (bottom) are guest judges.

The episode originally aired on February 13, 2012.

Shawn Morales is among members of the Pit Crew.

=== Fashion ===
For the main stage, RuPaul wears a silver dress with a blonde wig. For the fashion show, the contestants wear outfits with gold and silver elements. Milan has gold harem pants and a large dark wig. Chad Michales wears a long dress with long earrings and a large wig. Willam has a short dress with many chains, matching high-heeled shoes, and a blonde wig. Sharon Needles has a gold-and-silver outfit with silver high-heels and a short dark wig. Phi Phi O'Hara wears a short silver dress with matching gloves and a short dark wig. Madame LaQueer has a outer space-inspired outfit with silver pants and black high-heels. The Princess has an outfit with silver stripes and a headscarf. Jiggly Caliente wears a short dress, matching boots, large hoop earrings, and a tall wig. DiDa Ritz wears a gold bodysuit and a short brown wig. Latrice Royale has a gold dress, black boots, and a blonde wig. Kenya Michaels wears a short dress and a dark wig.

== Reception ==
Oliver Sava of The A.V. Club gave the episode a rating of 'A'.

David Byrne of the Windy City Times said DiDa Ritz "performed the best lip-synch performance ever in the show’s history". The performance has also been deemed among the show's best by writers for GQ, The Guardian, Screen Rant, Them, and Xtra Magazine. Kevin O'Keeffe ranked the performance third in INTO Magazine's 2018 "definitive ranking" of the show's lip-sync contests to date. O'Keeffe wrote, "Dida took 'This Will Be' and turned it up to 12, hitting every beat of the song, moving forcefully all over the stage, and nailing the bridge so precisely, even the late Natalie Cole had to shout with joy. Fellow competitor Latrice Royale called it 'high drag,' and five years later, we still haven't come down." Sam Brooks ranked the performance number 20 in The Spinoff's 2019 "definitive ranking" of the show's 162 lip-syncs to date, writing:

One of the most joyous lip-syncs of all time. Not only does Dida Ritz channel Natalie Cole in her prime, she confirms herself as a contender here. It’s a perfect match of song, energy and performer, only marred by the queen she has to share the stage with, who has one of the least imaginative names of all time and doesn’t quite know how to match the effervescence that Cole (RIP) brought to every song she did.

Stephen Daw selected the performance for the fourth season in Billboard's 2024 overview of the best lip-syncs from each season. In Screen Rant's 2022 list of the fifteen best lip-syncs on Drag Race and All Stars, Mariana Fernandes wrote, "What made this lip-sync so great was the complete lack of acrobatics, splits, and jumps on Dida's part. She just danced and performed with levels of energy that could power a small country for a decade, showcasing exactly what high drag is all about."
