= Amber Riley =

American actress and singer

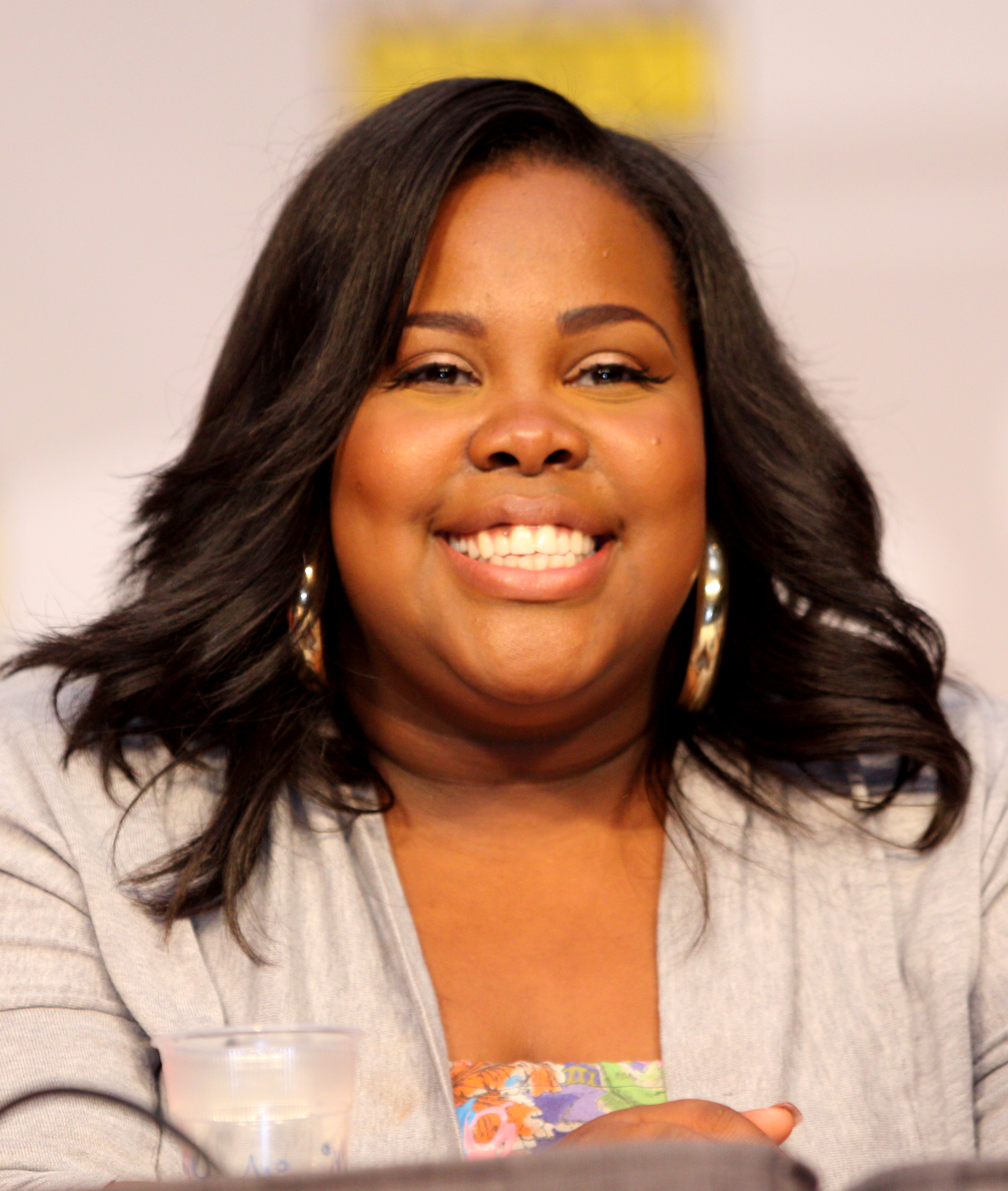
- Riley at the 2010 San Diego Comic-Con
- Born: Amber Patrice Riley; February 15, 1986 (age 40); Compton, California, U.S.
- Other name: RILEY
- Occupations: Actress; singer; songwriter
- Years active: 2002–present
- Musical career
- Genres: R&B; pop; Broadway; gospel; soul
- Instrument: Vocals
- Labels: Independent; RBMG; East West Records; Warner Music

Amber Patrice Riley (born February 15, 1986), sometimes known mononymously as Riley (stylized in all caps), is an American actress, singer and songwriter. She is best known for her portrayal of Mercedes Jones on the Fox comedy-drama series Glee (2009–2015), for which she was nominated for three NAACP Image Awards, and won a shared Screen Actors Guild Award for Outstanding Performance by an Ensemble in a Comedy Series. As a member of the Glee cast, Riley charted over 200 entries on the Billboard Hot 100, and was nominated for a Grammy Award.

In 2016, Riley originated the lead role of Effie White in the West End debut of Dreamgirls. For her work, she won the Laurence Olivier Award for Best Actress in a Musical and Evening Standard Theatre Award for Best Musical Performance in 2017.

Riley won the 17th season of Dancing with the Stars (2013). In 2017, Riley formed a musical theatre supergroup with Beverley Knight and Cassidy Janson, known collectively as Leading Ladies and signed to East West Records/Warner. Their album, Songs from the Stage, was released on November 17, 2017 and debuted within the top 20 of the UK Albums Chart. She also participated on the American and British versions of The Masked Singer, winning the 8th season of the American version, and being a finalist in the 4th season of the British version.

She voices the character Ursula in the Disney Jr. animated series Ariel, for which she received a nomination for the Children's and Family Emmy Awards for Outstanding Voice Performer in a Preschool Program.

== Early life ==
Riley was born in Los Angeles County, California. Her parents, Tiny Riley (née Hightower) and Elwin Riley, divorced when she was a child. She was raised primarily by her mother, along with her two older sisters, Toiya and Ashley. She graduated from La Mirada High School in La Mirada, California in 2004.

== Career ==
=== Early career ===
Riley auditioned for American Idol when she was 17 years old, during the show's second season, but was turned down by the producers. She was cast for her first role on TV in 2002, in a Ryan Murphy project (creator of Glee) called St. Sass, but the pilot was not picked up. She later worked as a customer service representative at Ikea for two years.

=== 2009–2019: Breakthrough with Glee, Dreamgirls and other appearances ===
In 2008, Riley was cast in the role of Mercedes Jones on the comedy-drama television series Glee, and appeared as a main cast member for all but one of the six seasons—she received guest star credit during season 5. Riley performed numerous solos throughout the series' run, including "Respect", "Bust Your Windows", "Hate on Me", "And I Am Telling You I'm Not Going", "Beautiful", "Bridge over Troubled Water", "I Look to You", "Ain't No Way", "Try a Little Tenderness", "Spotlight", "All I Want for Christmas Is You" and, three days after Whitney Houston's death, performed a tribute version of "I Will Always Love You". She also played Dr. Frank-N-Furter in the episode "The Rocky Horror Glee Show", singing the lead on the song "Sweet Transvestite" to generally positive reviews from critics.

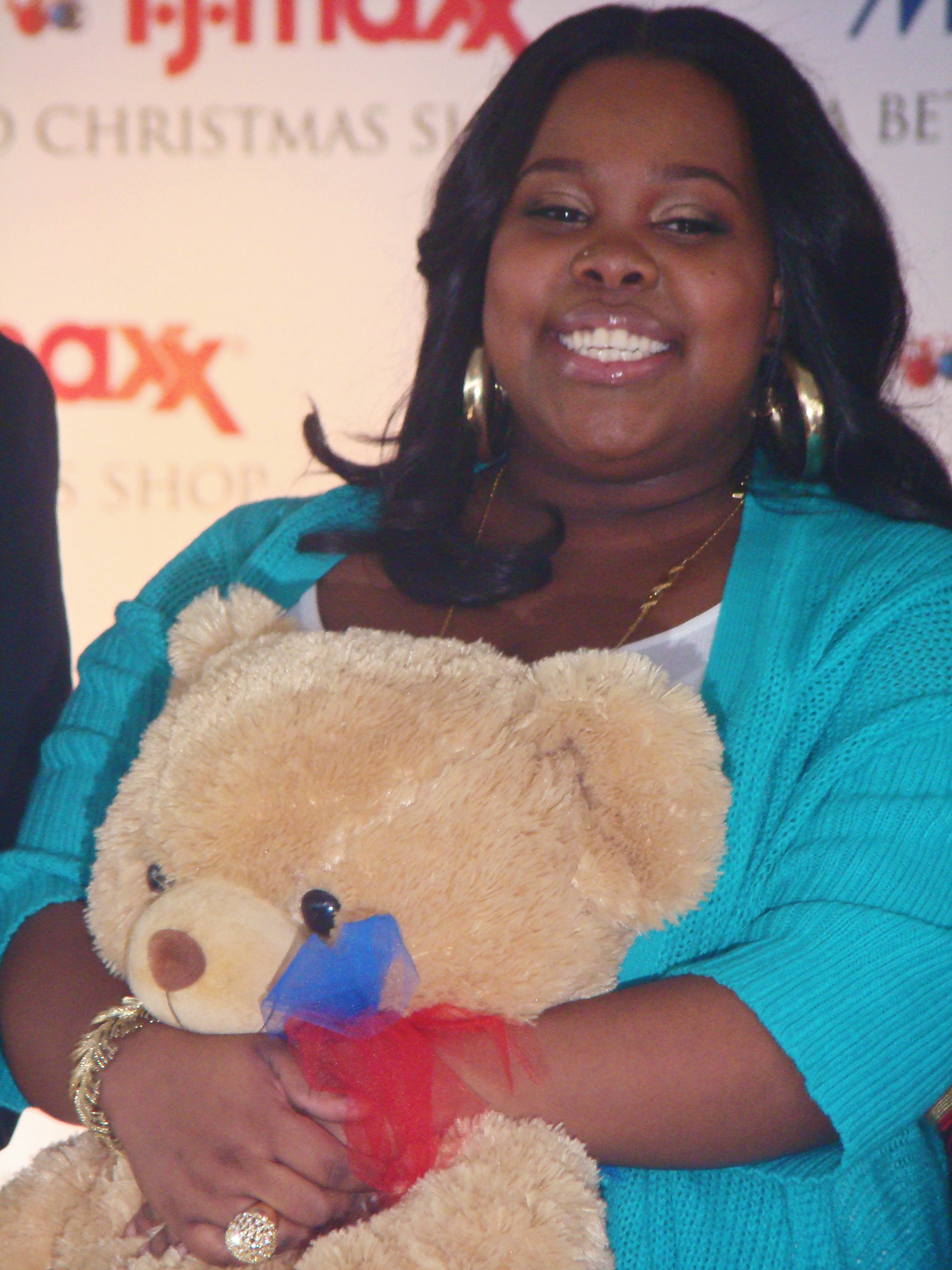
Riley at a Toys for Tots event in December 2009

For her role as Mercedes Jones, Riley won a Screen Actors Guild Award and received nominations for a Grammy Award, three NAACP Image Awards and three Teen Choice Awards.

In 2010, Riley sang the national anthem at the White House and at the 2012 Democratic National Convention.

She co-wrote a track titled "Leave a Light On" for British girl group The Saturdays, which is featured on their album Living for the Weekend. Riley's debut single, "Colorblind", premiered live on April 3, 2014, on The Queen Latifah Show. The song was written by Emeli Sandé, Claude Kelly and Steve Mac and was expected to be a single of her debut album. The song was performed by Riley in the fifth season episode Bash of Glee and was released on the episode's EP on April 8, 2014. In 2015, it was reported that Riley would star in a Christmas television film, her first movie role, and her first acting role, since Glee. In December 2015, she portrayed Addaperle, the Good Witch of the North, in NBC's live performance of The Wiz. In 2016 Riley recorded two tracks for Todrick Hall's visual album Straight Outta Oz. Also in 2016 she performed the national anthem at the second game of the 2016 NHL Stadium Series featuring the Detroit Red Wings and Colorado Avalanche at Coors Field. Riley sings the opening theme song of the animated children's series Doc McStuffins for seasons 4 and 5. In 2019, she took on the role of Audrey II, the carnivorous singing plant, in Little Shop of Horrors at Pasadena Playhouse.

==== Dancing with the Stars ====
In 2013, Riley won the seventeenth season of ABC's dancing competition Dancing with the Stars. She was partnered with the show's six-time champion, Derek Hough. Riley and Hough tied the record for highest first-week score of 27, received 5 perfect scores of 30, and only received a score lower than 8 one time. Riley is the first and only African-American woman to win Dancing with the Stars.

Performances

| Week # | Dance/song | Judges' score | | | Result |
| Week # | Dance/song | Inaba | Goodman | Tonioli | Result |
|---|---|---|---|---|---|
| 1 | Cha-Cha-Cha/"Wings" | 9 | 9 | 9 | No Elimination |
| 2 | Jive/"Reet Petite" | 8 | 8 | 8 | Safe |
| 3 | Charleston/"Bang Bang" | 8 | 8 | 8 | Safe |
| 4 | Tango/"Love Lockdown" | 9 | 9^{1} | 9 | Safe |
| 5 | Foxtrot/"Try a Little Tenderness" | 9 | 7 | 10 | Safe |
| 6 | Samba/"Get It Right"; Switch-Up Challenge | 10; Awarded | 8; 4 | 10; Points | No Elimination |
| 7 | Paso Doble/"Diablo Rojo"; Group Dance Freestyle/"The Fox (What Does the Fox Say?)" | 10; 10 | 10; 10 | 9; 10 | Safe |
| 8 | Rumba/"If I Could Turn Back Time" | 9 | 9^{2} | 10 | Safe (Immunity) |
| 9 | Quickstep/"That's It!"; Salsa (Trio challenge)^{3}/"Que Viva la Vida" | 8; 9 | 8; 9 | 8; 9 | Safe |
| 10; Semi-finals | Jazz/"Locked Out of Heaven"; Viennese Waltz/"Locked Out of Heaven" (Acoustic Version) | 10; 10 | 10/9^{4} 10/10^{4} | 10; 10 | Safe |
| 11; Finals | Charleston/"Bang Bang"; Samba relay/"No Scrubs"; Freestyle/"Can You Do This" | 10; Awarded; 10 | 10; 4; 10 | 10 points 10 | Safe |
| 11; Finals | Quickstep & Samba Fusion/"(Your Love Keeps Lifting Me) Higher and Higher" | 10 | 10 | 10 | Won |
^{1}In week four, judge Len Goodman was absent and guest judge Julianne Hough filled in for him.^{2}In week eight, judge Len Goodman was absent and guest judge Cher filled in for him.^{3}The dancer Hough and Riley chose for the Trio Challenge is Mark Ballas.^{4}Scores from guest judge Maksim Chmerkovskiy.

==== Dreamgirls and other works in London ====
In February 2016, it was announced that Riley would portray the lead role of Effie White in Dreamgirls at Savoy Theatre, marking the West End's first production of the musical and beginning performances in November 2016. The adaptation included a duet version of “Listen” with revised lyrics. Riley received widespread critical acclaim for her performance, earning the Laurence Olivier Award for Best Actress in a Musical in 2017, as well as the Evening Standard Theatre Award and a WhatsOnStage Award.

Due to its success, the Dreamgirls run at the Savoy Theatre was extended through October 2017, and a live cast recording of the West End production was released in May 2017.

During her time in London, in 2017, Riley teamed up with British singers Beverley Knight and Cassidy Janson to form the musical theatre supergroup Leading Ladies. Their debut album, Songs from the Stage, was released on November 17, 2017 and features cover songs from Cats, Beautiful, Rent, and other stage productions. The album debuted within the top 20 of the UK Albums Chart.

Also in 2017, she was a judge in the British reality show music competition Let It Shine on BBC One, during the auditions stage.

=== 2020–present: EP RILEY and other works ===
On February 28, 2020, Riley confirmed she had finished recording songs for her debut extended play (EP). She announced that she would be performing under the name "Riley" (stylized in all caps as "RILEY") and released the single "A Moment" on September 4, 2020. "BGE" (initialism for big girl energy) was released as the second single from the EP on September 18, alongside its music video. Her self-titled EP, RILEY, was released on October 2, 2020, featuring a total of six tracks. On October 8, 2020 she released a music video for the track "Creepin'".

In 2021, Riley starred as the lead character in the BET+ film Christmas Déjà Vu, in which she plays "a woman with a downtrodden life who hates Christmas and longs for the life she could have had as a singer. She meets an angel who grants her wish." Riley also starred in the Lifetime thriller trilogy Single Black Female, inspired by the 1992 film Single White Female. She plays Simone Hicks, an assistant who becomes an obsessive and dangerous stalker. The films were released in 2022, 2024 and 2025, and Riley also served as an executive producer in the two sequels.

In 2022, Riley competed in season eight of The Masked Singer as "Harp" and won the season. In 2023, she competed as "Jellyfish" on the fourth season of The Masked Singer UK and finished in fourth place.

In February 2023, Riley announced that her solo debut album would be released later that year. As of October 2025, the album is yet to be announced. In October 2023, she featured as a judge on the British reality talent competition Mamma Mia! I Have a Dream, which was filmed in Corfu, Greece.

Since 2024, Riley has voiced the character Ursula in the Disney Jr. animated series Ariel. The series was renewed for a second season in June 2025. For her work in the show, she was nominated for a Children's and Family Emmy Awards for Outstanding Voice Performer in a Preschool Program.

In September 2025, The CW announced a slate of original films based on Harlequin romance novels. Riley stars as the title character in Savvy Sheldon Feels Good As Hell, the movie premiered on November 30, 2025.

== Personal life ==
In November 2020, Riley announced her engagement to businessman Desean Black. In April 2022, she revealed that she and Black were no longer together.

Riley has been in a relationship with LA-based photographer Scoobz since October 2022.

== Filmography ==
Television
| Year | Title | Role | Notes |
|---|---|---|---|
| 2002 | St. Sass | Toby | Unsold pilot |
| 2009–2015 | Glee | Mercedes Jones | Main role (seasons 1—4, 6); Recurring role (season 5); 93 episodes |
| 2010 | The Simpsons | Aiesha (voice) | Episode: "Elementary School Musical" |
| 2010 | Disney Christmas Parade | Herself / Performer | Performance of "A Dream Is a Wish Your Heart Makes"/"Someday My Prince Will Come"/"A Whole New World"/"Beauty and the Beast"/"When You Wish Upon a Star" medley |
| 2012 | RuPaul's Drag Race | Herself / Guest Judge | Episode: "Glamazons vs. Champions" |
| 2012 | The Glee Project | Herself / Mentor | Episode: "Tenacity" |
| 2013 | Dancing with the Stars | Herself / Contestant | Season 17 winner |
| 2015 | The Wiz Live! | Addaperle | Television special |
| 2016 | 365 Black Awards | Herself / Host | |
| 2016 | Crazy Ex-Girlfriend | Dream Ghost #2 | Episode: "Josh Has No Idea Where I Am!" |
| 2016 | Royal Variety Performance | Herself / Performer | Performance of "And I Am Telling You I'm Not Going" |
| 2017 | Royal Variety Performance | Herself / Performer | Performance of "Somebody to Love" with the Leading Ladies. |
| 2017 | Let It Shine | Herself / Guest Judge | Auditions stage |
| 2019–2021 | A Black Lady Sketch Show | Various characters | 4 episodes |
| 2019 | The Little Mermaid Live! | Emcee | TV Special |
| 2019 | Drop the Mic | Herself / Contestant | Episode: "Amber Riley, Harry Shum Jr. and Becca Tobin vs. Kevin McHale, Jenna Ushkowitz and Heather Morris / Jason Biggs vs. Eddie Kaye Thomas" |
| 2018 | Celebrity Family Feud | Herself / Contestant | Episode: "Scotty McCreery vs. Chris Kattan and Amber Riley vs. Tori Spelling & Dean" |
| 2020 | The Disney Family Singalong | Herself / Performer | Performance of "Let It Go" |
| 2020 | Whose Line Is It Anyway? | Herself / Guest | Season 16 episode 1 |
| 2021 | WICKED in Concert | Herself / Performer | Performance of "What is This Feeling" and "Defying Gravity"; CBS special |
| 2021 | Celebrity Wheel of Fortune | Herself / Contestant | Season 2 episode 3 |
| 2022 | Step Into...The Movies With Derek and Julianne Hough | Herself / Performer | Performance of "El Tango de Roxanne" |
| 2022 | That's My Jam UK | Herself / Guest | Season 1 episode 3 |
| 2022 | The Masked Singer | Harp | Season 8 winner |
| 2023 | The Masked Singer UK | Jellyfish | Season 4; fourth place |
| 2023 | Mamma Mia! I Have a Dream | Herself / Judge | |
| 2023 | Name That Tune | Herself / Contestant | Episode: "Fox Legends: Gleeful Idols" |
| 2023 | Dick Van Dyke: 98 Years of Magic | Herself / Performer | Performance of "Chim Chim Cher-ee"; CBS special |
| 2024 | Monster High | Catty Noir (voice) | 2 episodes |
| 2024–present | Ariel | Ursula (voice) | Disney Junior's animated series; Main role |
| 2025 | Celebrity Weakest Link | Herself / Contestant | Episode: "Glee Homecoming" |
| 2026 | Diarra from Detroit | Keke Thompson | Episode: "A Tale of Two Plays" |

Film
| Year | Title | Role | Notes |
|---|---|---|---|
| 2011 | Glee: The 3D Concert Movie | Mercedes Jones | Concert film |
| 2015 | My One Christmas Wish | Jackie Turner | Television film |
| 2016 | Straight Outta Oz | Brenda | Television film |
| 2018 | Nobody's Fool | Kalli | |
| 2020 | Infamous | Elle | |
| 2021 | Christmas Deja Vu | Kandi | BET+ film |
| 2022 | Single Black Female | Simone Hicks | Lifetime film |
| 2024 | Single Black Female 2: Simone's Revenge | Simone Hicks | Lifetime film; also executive producer |
| 2025 | Single Black Female 3: Final Chapter | Simone Hicks | Lifetime film; also executive producer |
| 2025 | Savvy Sheldon Feels Good As Hell | Savvy Sheldon | Television film |

== Stage ==
| Year | Title | Role | Location |
|---|---|---|---|
| 2012 | Cotton Club Parade | Performer | New York City Center, Off-Broadway |
| 2014 | Hair | Dionne | Hollywood Bowl |
| 2016–2017 | Dreamgirls | Effie White | Savoy Theatre, West End |
| 2019 | Little Shop of Horrors | Audrey II | Pasadena Playhouse |
| 2024 | The Preacher's Wife | Julia Biggs | Alliance Theatre |

== Discography ==
=== Extended plays ===
| Title | Details |
|---|---|
| RILEY | Released: October 2, 2020; Label: Self-released; Format: Digital download, streaming; Track listing: 1. "BGE"; 2. "Temporary"; 3. "Creepin'"; 4. "Ride"; 5. "Hood Living" (featuring BJ the Chicago Kid); 6. "A Moment" |

=== Singles ===
| Title | Year | Album |
|---|---|---|
| "Colorblind" | 2014 | Glee: the Music, Bash |
| "Someone You Loved" | 2020 | Non-album Single |
| "A Moment" | 2020 | RILEY |
| "BGE" | 2020 | RILEY |
| "Creepin" | 2020 | RILEY |
| "MacArthur Park" (with Micah McLaurin) | 2024 | Non-album Single |

=== Guest appearances ===
| Year | Song | Album |
|---|---|---|
| 2013 | "Never Be Lonely" (with Eric Bellinger) | In The Meantime |
| 2014 | "Gold Generation" (with Eric Zayne) | Autobiograme |
| 2014 | "This Is What It Feels Like" (with Kenyon Dixon) | Twenty Four |
| 2016 | "Lions and Tigers and Bears" | Straight Outta Oz |
| 2016 | "See Your Face" | Straight Outta Oz |
| 2016 | "#ChangeRightNow" (with MAJOR.) | I Am Major |
| 2017 | "Anybody Who Knows What Love Is" (with Boyz II Men) | Under the Streetlight |
| 2019 | "I'm A Mess" (with Kenyon Dixon) | R&B Kenny |
| 2022 | "Only Fan (Remix)" (with Eric Bellinger) | Non-album Single |
| 2023 | "Waiting" (with Omarion) | Full Circle: Sonic Book One |

=== Soundtrack appearances ===
- Glee: The Music, Volume 1 (2009)
- Glee: The Music, Volume 2 (2009)
- Glee: The Music, The Power of Madonna (2010)
- Glee: The Music, Volume 3 Showstoppers (2010)
- Glee: The Music, Journey to Regionals (2010)
- Glee: The Music, The Complete Season One (2010)
- Glee: The Music, Best of Season One (2010)
- Glee: The Music, The Rocky Horror Glee Show (2010)
- Glee: The Music, The Christmas Album (2010)
- Glee: The Music, Volume 4 (2010)
- Glee: The Music, Love Songs (2010)
- Glee: The Music, Volume 5 (2011)
- Glee: The Music, Volume 6 (2011)
- Glee: The 3D Concert Movie (Motion Picture Soundtrack) (2011)
- Glee: The Music, Dance Party (2011)
- Glee: The Music, The Christmas Album Volume 2 (2011)
- Glee: The Music, Volume 7 (2011)
- Glee: The Music, The Graduation Album (2012)
- Glee: The Music, The Complete Season Two (2012)
- Glee: The Music, The Complete Season Three (2012)
- Glee: The Music Presents Glease (2012)
- Glee: The Quarterback (2013)
- Glee: The Music, The Complete Season Four (2014)
- Glee: The Music - Celebrating 100 Episodes (2014)
- Glee: The Music, Bash (2014)
- Glee: The Music, Tested (2014)
- Glee: The Music, Opening Night (2014)
- Glee: The Music, The Back Up Plan (2014)
- Glee: The Music, Old Dog, New Tricks (2014)
- Glee: The Music, The Untitled Rachel Barry Project (2014)
- Glee: The Music, Homecoming (2015)
- Glee: The Music, What the World Needs Now is Love (2015)
- Glee: The Music, Transitioning (2015)
- Glee: The Music, A Wedding (2015)
- Glee: The Music, 2009 (2015)
- Glee: The Music, Dreams Come True (2015)
- The Wiz Live! (2015)
- Crazy Ex-Girlfriend (Season 1, Vol. 2) (2016)
- Dreamgirls (Original London Cast Recording) (2017)
- The Little Mermaid Live! (2019)
- Disney Jr. Music: Ariel (2024)

== Awards and nominations ==
| Year | Award | Category | Work | Result | Ref. |
|---|---|---|---|---|---|
| 2010 | Screen Actors Guild Award | Outstanding Performance by an Ensemble in a Comedy Series | Glee | Won | |
| 2010 | Teen Choice Award | Choice TV: Female Scene Stealer | Glee | Nominated | |
| 2010 | Teen Choice Award | Choice Music: Group | Glee | Nominated | |
| 2011 | Grammy Award | Best Pop Performance by a Duo or Group with Vocals | "Don't Stop Believin' (Regionals version)" (Note: Shared with Cory Monteith, Lea Michele, Chris Colfer, Kevin McHale, Jenna Ushkowitz, Mark Salling and Naya Rivera) | Nominated | |
| 2011 | NAACP Image Award | Outstanding Supporting Actress in a Comedy Series | Glee | Nominated | |
| 2011 | Teen Choice Award | Choice TV: Female Scene Stealer | Glee | Nominated | |
| 2012 | NAACP Image Award | Outstanding Supporting Actress in a Comedy Series | Glee | Nominated | |
| 2013 | NAACP Image Award | Outstanding Actress in a Comedy Series | Glee | Nominated | |
| 2016 | Black Reel Awards | Best Supporting Actress in a TV Movie or Limited Series | The Wiz Live! | Nominated | |
| 2017 | Laurence Olivier Award | Best Actress in a Musical | Dreamgirls | Won | |
| 2017 | Evening Standard Theatre Award | Best Musical Performance | Dreamgirls | Won | |
| 2017 | WhatsOnStage Award | Best Actress in a Musical | Dreamgirls | Won | |
| 2018 | Classic Brit Award | Album of the Year | Songs from the Stage | Nominated | |
| 2024 | CMT Music Awards | CMT Performance of the Year | CMT Smashing Glass—R.E.S.P.E.C.T. | Nominated | |
| 2026 | Children's and Family Emmy Awards | Outstanding Voice Performer in a Preschool Program | Ariel | Nominated | |

Awards and achievements
| Preceded by Kellie Pickler & Derek Hough | Dancing with the Stars (US) winners Season 17 (Fall 2013 with Derek Hough) | Succeeded by Meryl Davis and Maksim Chmerkovskiy |
