= That's My Jam (British TV series) =

British game show

- Genre: Game show; Reality; Variety show
- Directed by: Glenn Weiss
- Presented by: Mo Gilligan
- Theme music composer: Adam Blackstone
- Country of origin: United Kingdom
- Original language: English
- No. of series: 1
- No. of episodes: 8

Production
- Executive producers: Will Macdonald; Andy Price; Pinki Chambers
- Producers: Isabel Forte; Sapphire Dew
- Production location: Universal Studios Lot Universal City, California
- Running time: 57 minutes
- Production companies: Monkey Kingdom; Universal Television Alternative Studio

Original release
- Network: BBC One
- Release: 17 December 2022 – 4 February 2023

Related
- That's My Jam

That's My Jam is a British television game show based on the American game show of the same name. It premiered on 17 December 2022 on BBC One and is hosted by British comedian Mo Gilligan.

== Format ==
The game features celebrity teams competing in music-themed challenges, such as "Mixtape Medley Showdown", "Slay It, Don't Spray It", "Wheel of Musical Impressions" and "Take On Mo".

== Production ==
In December 2021, it was reported that the BBC would be developing a British adaptation of That's My Jam with Mo Gilligan as host. In August 2022, the series was officially announced, with filming taking place in Los Angeles. In December 2022, it was announced that the show would premiere on BBC One on 17 December 2022.

== Episodes ==
No.	Title	Original release date	U.K. viewers (millions)
1	"Alesha Dixon & Michelle Visage vs. Kevin McHale & Jenna Ushkowitz"	17 December 2022	2.7
2	"Nicole Scherzinger & Thom Evans vs. Joey Fatone & Aloe Blacc"	24 December 2022	N/A
3	"Amber Riley & Donny Osmond vs. Shawn Stockman & Wanyá Morris"	31 December 2022	N/A
4	"Becky Hill & Jason Derulo vs. Salt-N-Pepa"	7 January 2023	N/A
5	"Camilla Luddington & Chris Carmack vs. Kimberly Wyatt & Gina Yashere"	14 January 2023	N/A
6	"Tom Grennan & Patsy Palmer vs. Tom Ellis & Billy Boyd"	21 January 2023	1.8
7	"Courtney Act & The Vivienne vs. Ricki Lake & Reggie Watts"	28 January 2023	1.3
8	"Chrishell Stause & Mary Fitzgerald vs. Lucy Davis & David Koechner"	4 February 2023	1.5

== Reception ==
Despite its success in the US, the show received poor reception from UK audiences and critics. Jack Seale of The Guardian gave the show two-out-of-five stars, calling the show "awkward". Michael Hogan of The Daily Telegraph gave the show one star out of five, criticizing the lack of British participants and calling it "embarrassing" and "clattering". Katie Timms of The Plymouth Herald gathered audience reactions which mainly gave negative feedback, some deemed it as "the worst programme on Saturday night television".
