= RuPocalypse Now! =

- RuPaul's Drag Race episode
- Episode no.: Season 4 Episode 1
- Presented by: RuPaul
- Original air date: January 30, 2012

Guest judges
- Elvira, Mistress of the Dark; Mike Ruiz

Episode chronology
← Previous "Reunited"	Next → "WTF!: Wrestling's Trashiest Fighters"
- RuPaul's Drag Race season 4

"RuPocalypse Now!" is the first episode of the fourth season of the American television series RuPaul's Drag Race. It originally aired on January 30, 2012. The episode's main challenge tasks the contestants with creating a "post-apocalyptic couture" outfit. Elvira, Mistress of the Dark and Mike Ruiz are guest judges. Sharon Needles wins the episode's main challenge. Alisa Summers is eliminated from the competition after placing in the bottom and losing a lip-sync contest against Jiggly Caliente to "Toxic" (2004) by Britney Spears.

== Episode ==
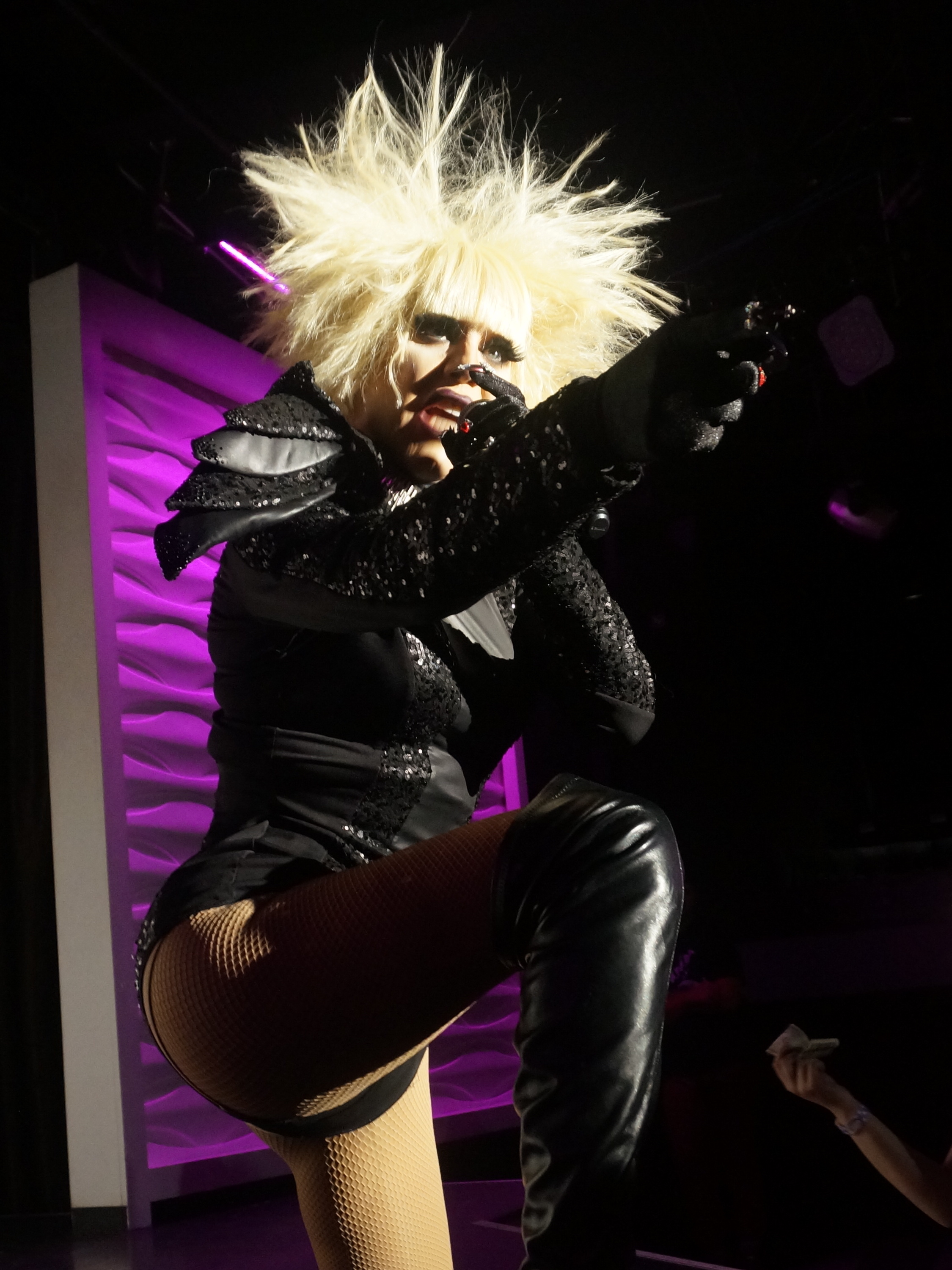
Sharon Needles wins the episode's main challenge.

Thirteen new contestants enter the workroom. RuPaul greets the group and tells the contestants they will need a survive a "RuPocalypse". RuPaul then invites members of the Pit Crew to reveal a final contestant, Shangela, which ends up being a gimmick and a reminder of who makes the rules. For the mini-challenge, the contestants participate in a photo shoot on a spinning platform while being sprayed with "hazardous waste" by members of the Pit Crew. Mike Ruiz is the photographer. As photo shoots are completed, the contestants return to the workroom to get out of drag. RuPaul and Ruiz return and reveal that Jiggly Caliente is the winner of the mini-challenge.

The contestants are taken off-site to a hotel parking lot. RuPaul reveals the main challenge, which tasks the contestants with creating a "post-apocalyptic couture" outfit made from items taken from "drag queen zombies". The contestants collect materials from the zombies, which included former contestants. Back in the workroom, the contestants start to create their looks. RuPaul returns to meet with each contestants, asking questions and offering advice. Latrice Royale talks about her experience in prison. Before leaving, RuPaul reveals that Elvira, Mistress of the Dark will be a guest judge.

On elimination day, the contestants make final preparations in the workroom for the fashion show. Jiggly Caliente talks about her mother's death. Alisa Summers talks about getting a DUI while in drag. On the main stage, RuPaul welcomes fellow judges Michelle Visage and Santino Rice, as well as guest judges Elvira and Ruiz. RuPaul shares the assignment of the main challenge, then the fashion show commences. After the contestants present their looks, the judges deliver their critiques, deliberate, then share the results with the group. Sharon Needles is declared the winner of the main challenge. Alisa Summers and Jiggly Caliente place in the bottom and face off in a lip-sync contest to "Toxic" (2004) by Britney Spears. Jiggly Caliente wins the lip-sync and Alisa Summers is eliminated from the competition.

== Production and broadcast ==
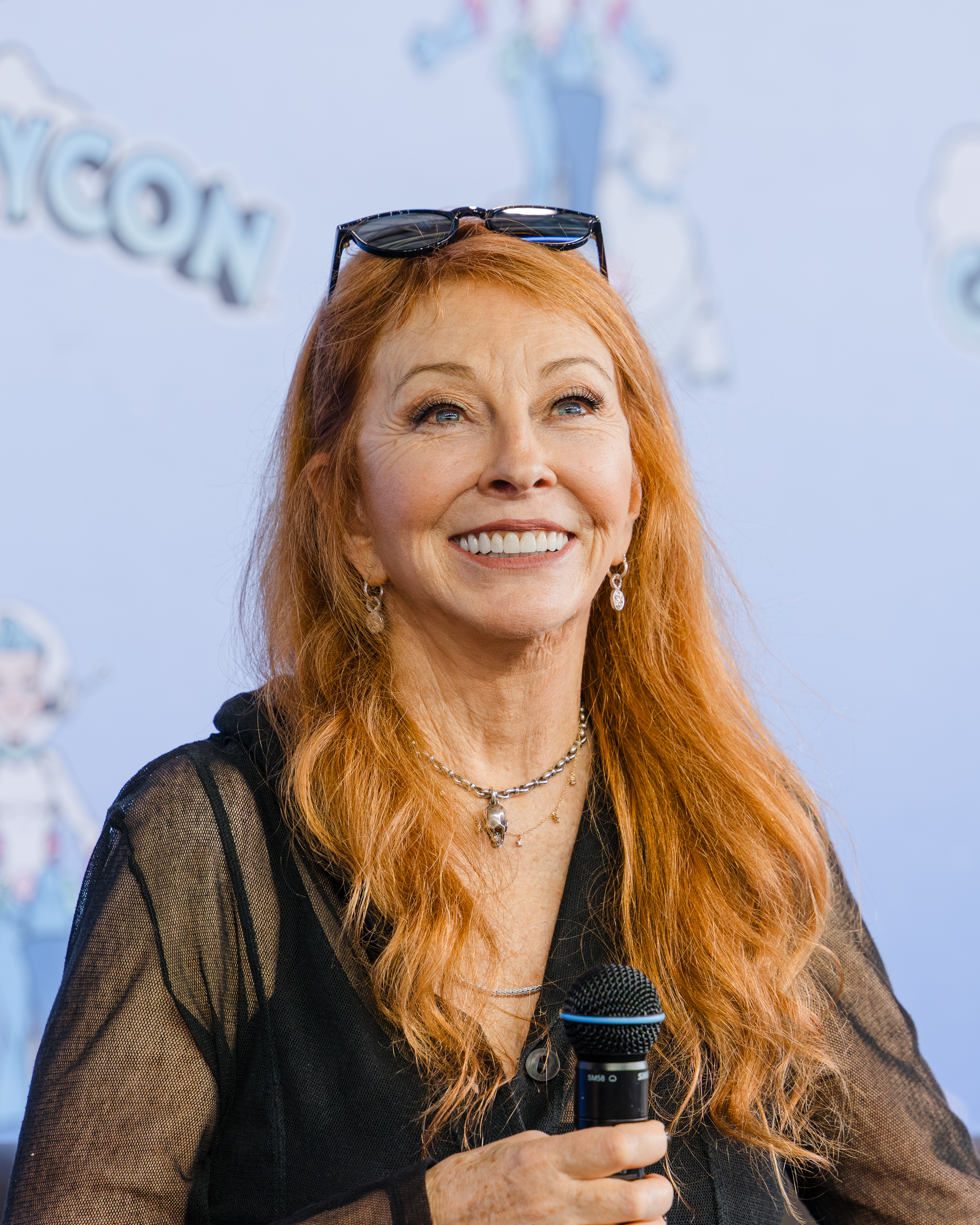
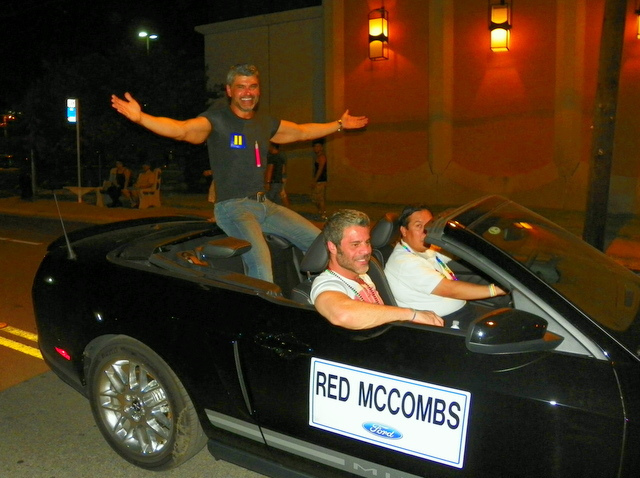
Elvira, Mistress of the Dark (top) and Mike Ruiz (bottom) are guest judges.

The episode originally aired on January 30, 2012.

Shawn Morales is among members of the Pit Crew. Among zombies in the mini-challenge are Akashia, Delta Work, Morgan McMichaels, Ongina, Pandora Boxx, Raven, Shannel, and Venus D-Lite.

=== Fashion ===
For her entrance look, Willam wears a short white skirt, denim, red boots, and a blonde wig. Lashauwn Beyond has a black-and-gold outfit with tall black boots and a dark wig. Jiggly Caliente wears a black dress with cherries, as well as red high-heeled shoes and a dark wig. She sucks on a lollipop. Phi Phi O'Hara has a green outfit. Madame LaQueer wears an animal print. Milan has a black-and-white outfit with a black hat. Alisa Summers's outfit is black, pink, and white and she has pink in her hair. DiDa Ritz has a yellow shirt, a jacket, and a blonde wig. The Princess wears a black-and-tan outfit with a matching hat. Kenya Michaels has jeans, high-heels, and a dark wig. Chad Michaels wears a black outfit and a dark wig. Sharon Needles has a black outfit with matching gloves, a witch hat, and a dark wig. Latrice Royale wears a colorful dress and a large dark wig.

For the main stage, RuPaul wears a red dress with a black belt, a blonde wig, and a red flower in her hair. For the fashion show, Willam has a black top and matching boots, a white belt, and a blonde wig. She carries an umbrella. Phi Phi O'Hara has many belts on her outfit, as well as large hoop earrings and a tall wig. Lashauwn Beyond wears a black-and-blue dress with a tall headpiece featuring a globe and red netting. Chad Michaels has a dress with netting, black boots, a collar, and a short wig. The Princess's nautical-themed outfit is blue, orange and white. Kenya Michaels wears a black-and-red outfit with large wings and a dark wig. Latrice Royale has a dress with netting, tall black boots, and a tall dark wig. Alisa Summers wears a black-and-red dress with toile, red high-heeled shoes, and a long ponytail. Milan has a purple dress and a dark wig. She wears one tall black boot and one high-heel. Jiggly Caliente has a colorful outfit with tutus and she carries part of a fake leg. DiDa Ritz wears tall black boots and a blonde wig. Madame LaQueer has short dress with an animal print, gold shoes, and a dark wig. Sharon Needles wears a brown dress and lets theatrical blood spill from her mouth.

== Reception and legacy ==
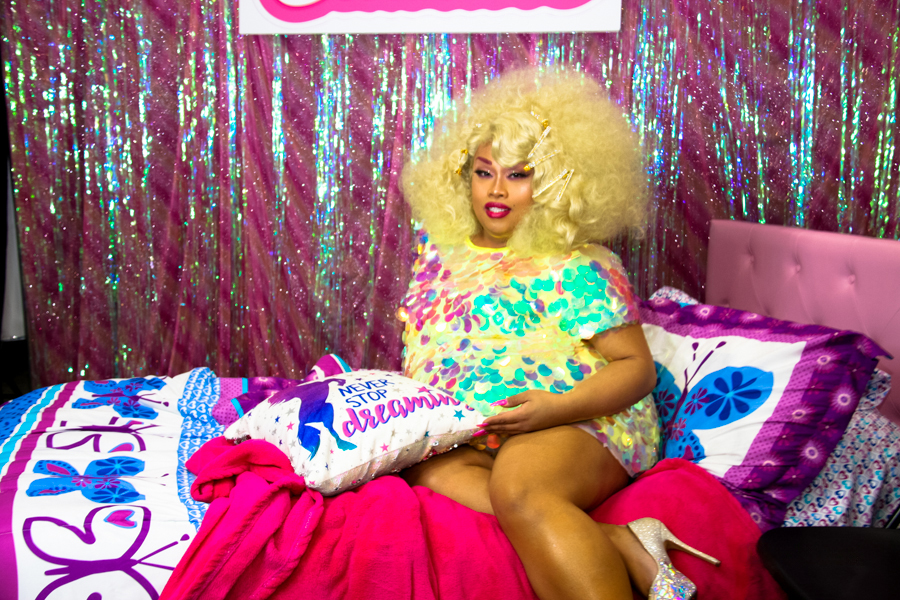
Jiggly Caliente won the episode's lip-sync contest.

Oliver Sava of The A.V. Club gave the episode a rating of 'A'. In 2019, Mariana Fernandes included Lashauwn Beyond's look in Screen Rant's list of ten "design challenge runner-ups that should have won". Sam Brooks ranked the "Toxic" performance number 99 in The Spinoff's 2019 "definitive ranking" of the show's 162 lip-syncs to date.

RuPaul recalled the lip-sync in a subsequent episode also featuring "Toxic". In 2025, Richard Holman of IN Magazine said, "I’ll never forget her first lip sync for her life against Alisa Summers to Britney Spears’ 'Toxic.' It was messy. It was wild. Her outfit was literally falling apart mid-performance. And yet — it was drag magic, it was lip syncing stunting, without meaning to be." Holman also wrote, "It wasn’t about looking perfect. It was about feeling the song, about fighting to stay, about pouring every ounce of yourself into that moment. Jiggly fought harder than anyone and earned her spot to stay — creating one of the most iconic early lip syncs in Drag Race herstory. It’s moments like that, the ones that aren’t pristine but are so full of heart, that remind us what drag is truly about."
