= That's My Jam =

American game show

- Genre: Game show; Reality; Variety show
- Directed by: Glenn Weiss
- Presented by: Jimmy Fallon
- Country of origin: United States
- Original language: English
- No. of seasons: 2
- No. of episodes: 17

Production
- Executive producers: Jimmy Fallon; Jim Juvonen; Mike Yurchuk
- Production location: Universal Studios Lot Universal City, California
- Running time: 44 minutes
- Production companies: Electric Hot Dog; Open 4 Business Productions; Universal Television Alternative Studio

Original release
- Network: NBC
- Release: November 29, 2021 – present

Related
- The Tonight Show Starring Jimmy Fallon

That's My Jam is an American music game show. Hosted by Jimmy Fallon, the series is based on the music-themed segments of The Tonight Show Starring Jimmy Fallon. It premiered on NBC with a preview episode on November 29, 2021, ahead of its timeslot premiere on January 3, 2022.

In February 2022, the series was renewed for a second season, which premiered in March 2023. In October 2023, the series was renewed for a third season.

== Production ==
On March 13, 2019, it was announced that NBC had made a 10-episode order for That's My Jam, a variety game show which would feature celebrities competing in music-themed challenges inspired by those seen on its late-night talk show The Tonight Show Starring Jimmy Fallon. On January 11, 2020, it was announced that Fallon would host the series (marking his first primetime series for NBC), which was slated to premiere after the closing ceremonies of the 2020 Summer Olympics. However due to the COVID-19 pandemic, the Olympics were postponed to 2021, while NBC slated different programming to air after the closing ceremonies instead.

On October 28, 2021, it was announced that the series would premiere on January 3, 2022 as part of NBC's midseason lineup, with a special preview episode airing on November 29 featuring Kelly Clarkson, Ariana Grande, John Legend, and Blake Shelton of The Voice.

On February 7, 2022, NBC renewed the series for a second season, which premiered on March 7, 2023. On October 17, 2023, NBC renewed the series for a third season. On February 27, 2024, it was announced that production had been paused for the third season.

== Format ==
The game features celebrity teams competing in music-themed challenges, some of which adapted from recurring segments on The Tonight Show, such as "Mixtape Medley Showdown", "Slay It, Don't Spray It", and "Wheel of Musical Impressions".

== Episodes ==
=== Series overview ===
Season	Episodes	Originally released	
Season	Episodes	First released	Last released
1	6	November 29, 2021	January 31, 2022
Special		December 5, 2022	
2	10	March 7, 2023	May 15, 2023

=== Season 1 (2021–22) ===
No. overall	No. in season	Title	Original release date	Prod. code	U.S. viewers (millions)
1	1	"Ariana Grande & Blake Shelton vs. Kelly Clarkson & John Legend"	November 29, 2021	101	4.26
Games Include: Perfect Mashup, Vinyl Countdown, Air Guitar, Wheel of Impossible Karaoke, Slay It - Don't Spray It; Winners: Kelly Clarkson & John Legend
2	2	"Joseph Gordon-Levitt & Chance the Rapper vs. Alessia Cara & Josh Groban"	January 3, 2022	102	2.12
Games Include: Launch the Mic, Random Instrument Challenge, Get Outta My Face, Wheel of Impossible Karaoke, Slay It - Don't Spray It; Winners: Joseph Gordon-Levitt & Chance The Rapper
3	3	"Taika Waititi & Rita Ora vs. Normani & Taraji P. Henson"	January 10, 2022	103	2.03
Games Include: Launch the Mic, Disco Charades, Don't Drop the Beat, Wheel of Impossible Karaoke, Slay It - Don't Spray It; Winners: Taika Waititi & Rita Ora
4	4	"Anthony Anderson & T-Pain vs. Ryan Tedder & Bebe Rexha"	January 17, 2022	104	1.96
Games Include: Perfect Mashup, Random Instrument Challenge, Don't Drop the Beat, Wheel of Impossible Karaoke, Slay It - Don't Spray It; Winners: Ryan Tedder & Bebe Rexha
5	5	"Jay Pharoah & Nikki Glaser vs. Terry Crews & Dan Finnerty"	January 24, 2022	105	1.98
Games Include: Get Outta My Face, Disco Charades, Air Guitar, Wheel of Impossible Karaoke, Slay It - Don't Spray It; Winners: Terry Crews & Dan Finnerty
6	6	"Kate Hudson & Oliver Hudson vs. Jordana Brewster & Brent Morin"	January 31, 2022	106	2.36
Games Include: Vinyl Countdown, Air Guitar, Undercover Covers, Wheel of Impossible Karaoke, Slay It - Don't Spray It; Winners: Kate Hudson & Oliver Hudson

=== Special (2022) ===
Title	Original release date	U.S. viewers (millions)
"Holiday Edition: Fred Armisen & Ana Gasteyer vs. Rachel Dratch & Melissa Villaseñor"	December 5, 2022	2.39
Games Include: Turn the Beat Around, Undercover Covers, More Than a Feeling, Wheel of Impossible Karaoke, Slay It - Don't Spray It; Winners: Rachel Dratch & Melissa Villaseñor

=== Season 2 (2023) ===
No. overall	No. in season	Title	Original release date	Prod. code	U.S. viewers (millions)
7	1	"Jason Derulo & Nicole Scherzinger vs. Kelsea Ballerini & Julia Michaels"	March 7, 2023	201	3.21
Games Include: Launch the Mic, Don't Fear the Speaker, Air Guitar, Wheel of Impossible Karaoke, Slay It - Don't Spray It; Winners: Kelsea Ballerini & Julia Michaels
8	2	"Billy Porter & Patti LaBelle vs. Darren Criss & Sarah Hyland"	March 14, 2023	202	2.55
Games Include: Disco Charades, More Than a Feeling, Don't Drop the Beat, Wheel of Impossible Karaoke, Slay It - Don't Spray It; Winners: Billy Porter & Patti LaBelle
9	3	"Chance the Rapper & French Montana vs. Jabari Banks & Quavo"	March 21, 2023	203	2.66
Games Include: Launch the Mic, Don't Drop the Beat, Drawing a Blank, Wheel of Impossible Karaoke, Slay It - Don't Spray It; Winners: Chance the Rapper & French Montana
10	4	"Taraji P. Henson & John Stamos vs. Quinta Brunson & Craig Robinson"	March 28, 2023	204	2.69
Games Include: Turn the Beat Around, Perfect Mashup, Random Instrument Challenge, Wheel of Impossible Karaoke, Slay It - Don't Spray It; Winners: Taraji P. Henson & John Stamos
11	5	"Keke Palmer & Saweetie vs. Joel McHale & will.i.am"	April 4, 2023	205	2.25
Games Include: Turn the Beat Around, Get Outta My Face, Perfect Mashup, Wheel of Impossible Karaoke, Slay It - Don't Spray It; Winners: Joel McHale & will.i.am
12	6	"Simu Liu & Halle Bailey vs. Chloe Bailey & Adam Lambert"	April 17, 2023	206	3.11
Games Include: Launch the Mic, Don't Fear the Speaker, The Vinyl Countdown, Wheel of Impossible Karaoke, Slay It - Don't Spray It; Winners: Simu Liu & Halle Bailey
13	7	"Kenan Thompson & Big Boi vs. Kesha & Renée Elise Goldsberry"	April 24, 2023	207	2.41
Games Include: Undercover Covers, Don't Fear the Speaker, The Vinyl Countdown, Wheel of Impossible Karaoke, Slay It - Don't Spray It; Winners: Kesha & Renée Elise Goldberry
14	8	"Mike "The Miz" & Alexa Bliss vs. Diallo Riddle & Bashir Salahuddin"	May 1, 2023	208	2.21
Games Include: Air Guitar, Bop Quiz, Get Outta My Face, Wheel of Impossible Karaoke, Slay It - Don't Spray It; Winners: Mike "The Miz" & Alexa Bliss
15	9	"Jenna Dewan & JoJo Siwa vs. Nikki Glaser & Jay Pharoah"	May 8, 2023	209	2.37
Games Include: The Vinyl Countdown, Disco Charades, Air Guitar, Wheel of Impossible Karaoke, Slay It - Don't Spray It; Winners: Nikki Glaser & Jay Pharoah
16	10	"Greatest Hits: Vol. 1"	May 15, 2023	210	2.27
Games Include: Launch The Mic, The Vinyl Countdown, Perfect Mashup, Air Guitar, Turn the Beat Around, Get Outta My Face, Wheel of Impossible Karaoke, Slay It - Don't Spray It; Greatest Dance Teamwork and Under Pressure Moments: Disco Charades, Random Instrument Challenge, Don't Fear the Speaker, Undercover Covers, Don't Drop the Beat

== Reception ==
=== Season 1 ===
Viewership and ratings per episode of That's My Jam
No.	Title	Air date	Timeslot (ET)	Rating (18–49)	Viewers (millions)	DVR (18–49)	DVR viewers (millions)	Total (18–49)	Total viewers (millions)
1	"Ariana Grande & Blake Shelton vs. Kelly Clarkson & John Legend"	November 29, 2021	Monday 10:00 p.m.	0.6	4.26	0.1	0.59	0.7	4.85
2	"Joseph Gordon-Levitt & Chance the Rapper vs. Alessia Cara & Josh Groban"	January 3, 2022	Monday 9:00 p.m.	0.4	2.12	0.1	0.48	0.5	2.59 (Note: Live+7 ratings were unavailable, so Live+3 ratings have been used instead.)
3	"Taika Waititi & Rita Ora vs. Normani & Taraji P. Henson"	January 10, 2022	Monday 9:00 p.m.	0.4	2.03	—N/a	—N/a	—N/a	—N/a
4	"Anthony Anderson & T-Pain vs. Ryan Tedder & Bebe Rexha"	January 17, 2022	Monday 9:00 p.m.	0.4	1.96	0.1	0.49	0.6	2.44
5	"Jay Pharoah & Nikki Glaser vs. Terry Crews & Dan Finnerty"	January 24, 2022	Monday 9:00 p.m.	0.4	1.98	0.1	0.38	0.5	2.36
6	"Kate Hudson & Oliver Hudson vs. Jordana Brewster & Brent Morin"	January 31, 2022	Monday 9:00 p.m.	0.4	2.36	—N/a	—N/a	—N/a	—N/a

=== Season 2 ===
Viewership and ratings per episode of That's My Jam
No.	Title	Air date	Timeslot (ET)	Rating (18–49)	Viewers (millions)
Special	"Holiday Edition: Fred Armisen & Ana Gasteyer vs. Rachel Dratch & Melissa Villaseñor"	December 5, 2022	Monday 10:00 p.m.	0.4	2.39
1	"Jason Derulo & Nicole Scherzinger vs. Kelsea Ballerini & Julia Michaels"	March 7, 2023	Tuesday 10:00 p.m.	0.4	3.21
2	"Billy Porter & Patti LaBelle vs. Darren Criss & Sarah Hyland"	March 14, 2023	Tuesday 10:00 p.m.	0.3	2.55
3	"Chance the Rapper & French Montana vs. Jabari Banks & Quavo"	March 21, 2023	Tuesday 10:00 p.m.	0.4	2.66
4	"Taraji P. Henson & John Stamos vs. Quinta Brunson & Craig Robinson"	March 28, 2023	Tuesday 10:00 p.m.	0.5	2.69
5	"Keke Palmer & Saweetie vs. Joel McHale & will.i.am"	April 4, 2023	Tuesday 10:00 p.m.	0.3	2.25
6	"Simu Liu & Halle Bailey vs. Chloe Bailey & Adam Lambert"	April 17, 2023	Monday 10:00 p.m.	0.4	3.11
7	"Kenan Thompson & Big Boi vs. Kesha & Renée Elise Goldsberry"	April 24, 2023	Monday 10:00 p.m.	0.3	2.41
8	"Mike "The Miz" & Alexa Bliss vs. Diallo Riddle & Bashir Salahuddin"	May 1, 2023	Monday 10:00 p.m.	0.3	2.21
9	"Jenna Dewan & JoJo Siwa vs. Nikki Glaser & Jay Pharoah"	May 8, 2023	Monday 10:00 p.m.	0.3	2.37
10	"Greatest Hits: Vol. 1"	May 15, 2023	Monday 10:00 p.m.	0.3	2.27

== International versions ==
On December 7, 2021, NBC announced that it had sold the format to France's TF1, under the name Stéréo Club, hosted by Camille Combal. The series premiered on May 20, 2022.

On August 24, 2022, it was announced that a UK adaptation, hosted by Mo Gilligan and broadcast on BBC One, would be filmed entirely in Los Angeles. The series premiered on December 17, 2022, to a particularly poor critical and audience reception, leading to it being axed thereafter after only one series.

On October 18, 2022, it was announced that adaptations were being developed for Spain, Portugal, Italy and Mongolia.

On February 9, 2023, it was announced that a German adaptation, hosted by Bill and Tom Kaulitz of Tokio Hotel, would be broadcast on RTL+.

Country	Name	Presenter(s)	Channel	Broadcast	Ref.
France	Stéréo Club	Camille Combal	TF1	May 20 – July 1, 2022	
Germany	That's My Jam mit Bill & Tom Kaulitz	Bill Kaulitz and Tom Kaulitz	RTL+	May 12, 2023 – present	
Italy	TBA	Stefano De Martino	Rai 2	TBA	
Mongolia	That's My Jam Mongolia	Ankhbayar Ganbold	Central Television	December 31, 2023 – present	
Netherlands	That's My Jam	Quinty Misiedjan	ZWART (NPO 1)	December 12, 2023 – present	
Portugal	TBA	TBA	TBA	TBA	
Spain	That's My Jam España	Arturo Valls	Movistar Plus+	October 2 – November 20, 2023	
Spain	That's My Jam: Que el ritmo no pare	Arturo Valls	La 1	May 6, 2025 – present	
United Kingdom	That's My Jam	Mo Gilligan	BBC One	December 17, 2022 – February 4, 2023	
