= Zanna, Don't! =

- A Musical Fairy Tale
- Music: Tim Acito
- Lyrics: Tim Acito; Alexander Dinelaris
- Book: Tim Acito; Alexander Dinelaris
- Productions: 2003 Off-Broadway * 2007 Los Angeles; 2008 San Francisco; 2009 London; 2013 New Zealand; 2017 Atlanta (Reboot); 2018 Fort Lauderdale

Zanna, Don't! (subtitled "A Musical Fairy Tale") is a 2003 musical written by Tim Acito with additional lyrics and material by Alexander Dinelaris. The story is set in a parallel universe where homosexuality is the norm and heterosexuality is a taboo: Zanna is the local matchmaker at Heartsville High, bringing happy couples together in mid-west America, but heterophobia strikes when a pair of opposite-sex highschoolers discover their feelings for each other. The show has been produced off-Broadway, off West End, and in regional theatres.

== Synopsis ==
The musical is set in Heartsville, U.S.A, once upon a time. The exact time period is not specified, but the play takes place across a school year, beginning on the first day and ending at prom. This is an alternate, fairy tale America, where the majority of the world is homosexual, with heterosexuals subject to heterophobia. Despite the fairy tale aspect, the world is essentially equivalent to ours, with references to Star Trek, the internet, Wayne Gretzky, and many other recognizable people, things or ideas. The majority of the play is set at Heartsville High, where the main characters are students.

As the school year begins, DJ and student Tank reminds the world that Zanna is on the look-out for any extra love that needs to be shared ("Who's Got Extra Love?"). Zanna finds new kid Steve Bookman (a quarterback) lonely. Zanna sets him up with Mike Singer, a chess champion and idol of school. (In the musical's world, chess players are sex symbols, and football players nobodies.) Their love blooms quickly ("I Think We Got Love").

Meanwhile, Kate Aspero, all-around overachiever, finds love with Roberta, a part-time waitress. Kate had long resisted Zanna's efforts to find love for her, citing "SATs, ACTs, APs, and GPAs" as being more worthy of her time, while Roberta seemed destined to a life of cheating girlfriends. She laments this in "I Ain't Got Time," much to the chagrin of the diner's customers. Spurred by Zanna's magic, Roberta impresses Kate so strongly ("Ride 'Em") that they become a couple.

Zanna, pleased with his success, settles down for the night, singing "Zanna's Song" as he says goodnight to his magic wand and goodbye to his feathered friend Cindy, who migrates to Fort Lauderdale.

The next day, the kids decide to create a musical addressing the controversy over heterosexuals in the military. Their play includes the song "Be A Man," touting the impressive homosexual leaders of history (including Leonardo da Vinci, Alexander the Great, and the ancient Spartans), and "Don't Ask, Don't Tell," an overly dramatic ballad about a heterosexual couple forced to hide their love from the Army.

In a reprise of "Don't Ask, Don't Tell," Kate and Steve realize they have feelings for each other, a fact they try quickly to forget, as their town is extremely heterophobic.

Some amount of time passes. At the "I'm Okay, You're Okay Corral," Mike proposes moving in with Steve after graduation, but Steve, trying to avoid the issue, believes they should slow down. Three Corral regulars, Tex, Bronco, and Loretta, insist that love should go "Fast." Steve, scared and confused runs from Mike, who describes Steve's unpredictable behavior in "I Could Write Books." Later, and much to the amusement of Tex, Bronco, and Loretta, it is also revealed that Zanna has feelings for Steve.

Kate and Steve's perplexing behavior leads Mike and Roberta to playfully suggest to each other "Don't You Wish We Could Be In Love?", but the light-hearted song turns serious as Kate, Steve, and Zanna all join in, reflecting on their relationships.

The focus shifts to the State Chess Finals. Steve promises to exchange varsity rings with Mike after the match, while Kate puts all her effort into being a perfect girlfriend to Roberta. Mike's hesitation in the final match causes Roberta to lead a raucous cheer that becomes the song "Whatcha Got?"—a successful cheer indeed, causing Mike to win the tournament.

But in the resulting celebration, Kate and Steve kiss, throwing the town into chaos. Mike, Steve, Kate, and Roberta are devastated ("Do You Know What It's Like?"). Kate and Steve run into classmates Candi and Buck, who have suddenly distanced themselves from the heterosexual couple. Unable to handle living in a heterophobic environment, Kate and Steve plan to run away from Heartsville. Zanna, desperate to make the world safe for them, finds a spell that, while likely to cost him his powers (and a possible deterioration of taste and style), will make everything better, or so he hopes. Deciding that nothing done for love can ever hurt, Zanna performs the spell ("'Tis a Far, Far Better Thing I Do/Blow Winds").

Zanna's spell is a success, in a way. Kate and Steve are King and Queen of the Prom, and everyone there is singing "Straight To Heaven." But Zanna finds that everyone is now heterosexual, and that no one can remember what life was like before the spell, to the point that Zanna himself is ostracized. He reflects on his life, hoping that "Someday You Might Love Me." The students, overhearing this song, realize that they were mistaken in abandoning their friend, singing a reprise of "Straight to Heaven" with "straight" replaced with "right." Prom is a success, and Zanna is invited to a post-prom party, but he chooses to stay behind and think for a while. On his way home, he drops a shoe, and true to fairy tales, Tank rushes to return it to him, revealing not just his memories of before the spell but his love of Zanna, begging "Sometime, Do You Think We Could Fall In Love?"

The happy couple is joined by the ensemble for a reprise of "Sometime, Do You Think..." at the curtain call.

== Characters ==
In parentheses are the actors who portrayed the role in the original Off-Broadway cast. Unless otherwise noted, each character is a student at Heartsville High.

- Zanna (Jai Rodriguez) - The magical matchmaker himself, Zanna has devoted his life to creating couples, while ignoring his own lovelife. His best friends are a bird (Cindy) and his magic wand.
- Tank (Robb Sapp) - A kind and caring DJ, who describes himself as "a sort of charming, somewhat handsome, not so princely guy," who cares for Zanna deeply but goes unnoticed for most of the show.
- Kate (Shelley Thomas) - A notorious overachiever with plans for a medical degree, she mistakes her own heterosexuality for ambition but tries with Roberta anyway. She is the captain of the Girls' Intramural Mechanical Bull-Riding Team.
- Roberta (Anika Larsen) - A waitress at a diner in her spare time, she has found no luck in love- each new girlfriend seems to "dump her the next day." Her best friend is Mike.
- Steve (Jared Zeus) - New to Heartsville, Steve's two dads are five-star generals. As a result, Steve has spent much of his life moving around and never making deep connections, but Zanna is sure he'll find a place in Heartsville. He's the quarterback of the football team.
- Mike (Enrico Rodriguez) - A champion chess player and school sex symbol, Mike is a modest and caring teen, and best friends with Roberta.
- Candi (Amanda Ryan Paige) - A domineering girl, she is involved in the Drama Club and knows all the latest gossip.
- Buck* (Darius Nichols) - Candi's friend, his opinions are overshadowed by her own ideas.
- Bronco, Tex, and Loretta - Played by the same actors as Buck, Tank, and Candi (respectively), these local adults sing the song "Fast," describing why falling in love fast is the best way to do it.

(*Arvin in London and subsequent productions)

In addition, the ensemble plays various townspeople and the Girls' Intramural Mechanical Bull-Riding Team.

== Songs ==
Track Listing from the Off-Broadway Recording:

- Who's Got Extra Love?
- I Think We Got Love
- I Ain't Got Time
- Ride 'Em
- Zanna's Song
- Be a Man
- Don't Ask, Don't Tell
- Fast
- I Could Write Books
- Don't You Wish We Could Be In Love?
- Whatcha Got?
- Do You Know What It's Like?
- 'Tis a Far, Far Better Thing I Do
- Blow Winds
- Straight To Heaven
- Someday You Might Love Me
- Straight to Heaven (Reprise)
- Sometime, Do You Think We Could Fall in Love?
- Finale

The Off Broadway recording, released by P.S. Classics, is available online, on Spotify, iTunes, Amazon Music, and in stores.

== Productions ==
Zanna, Don't! had a developmental run Off-Broadway at the Rodney Kirk Theatre from October 17, 2002, to November 3, 2002. It had a second off-Broadway run beginning on March 20, 2003, at the John Houseman Theater. The run closed after three months, playing 17 previews and 119 performances. Devanand Janki directed and choreographed, with a cast that featured Jai Rodriguez as the "Magical Matchmaker" Zanna in the 2003 production. It was produced off-Broadway by Jack M. Dalgleish in association with Stephanie A. Joel. A Broadway production was planned for 2005, but was cancelled. The title of the musical would have been changed from Zanna, Don't! to simply Zanna!. After workshops with Avenue Q star John Tartaglia, revamping of the script and score, the run was postponed. The title of the show was originally inspired by the film Xanadu, because Acito originally envisioned the lead character on roller skates, and Acito wanted to pay homage to the film. But, the roller-skating idea was soon dropped. Nevertheless, "Zanna, Don't is a loving tribute to pop culture, and I thought a reference to Xanadu would be appropriate. It sort of represents the best and – many would argue – the worst of pop culture."

A Los Angeles production, described as the West Coast premiere, opened in July 2007 by The West Coast Ensemble at the Lyric-Hyperion Theatre. Directed by Nick DeGruccio, the cast included Danny Calvert in the title role. The production received multiple nominations from the Los Angeles Drama Critics Circle, with Calvert winning the award for Best Lead Performance.

The west coast premiere at Contemporary Classics in Seattle (June 2008) cast included Don Darryl Rivera (Broadway's Aladdin) as Tank, Diana Huey as Roberta, and Casey Craig as Zanna. The Seattle Times recognized the production as one of the top musicals of 2008. Contemporary Classics revived the production in 2009 and 2010, with some new cast members each year.

The San Francisco premier opened at New Conservatory Theatre Center on December 5, 2008. Directed by F. Allen Sawyer and Musically Directed by G. Scott Lacy; the cast featured Price Troche Jr. as Zanna, Stephen Foreman as Steve, Katrina McGraw as Kate, Timitio Artusio as Mike, Cindy Im as Roberta, Brian J. Patterson as Tank, Miquela Sierra as Candi, and Rodney Earl Jackson Jr. as Buck. The NCTC cast won San Francisco Bay Area Theatre Critics Circle (BATCC) awards for best ensemble, best choreography and best musical direction.

It debuted in Europe on August 1, 2008, at George Square Theatre, Edinburgh, by students of the RSAMD, where it ran until 24 August. Zanna, Don't! premiered in London in May 2009, starring Mike Shearer as Zanna. Presented by Wild Oats Productions as part of the Enterprise 09 Festival, the musical was directed by Joseph C. Walsh and choreographed by Philip Scutt. It played a limited sell out season at The Space. The production later transferred to the Upstairs at the Gatehouse in June 2009, where it received rave reviews. The Zanna, Don't! cast could also be seen at West End Live! Leicester Square and "Best of The West End" Leicester Square Theatre.

The Los Angeles production of Zanna, Don't! premiered January 6, 2012, and ran until February 25, 2012, at Theatre/Theater produced by The Spotlight Theatre from Bakersfield, California. Directed by Alex Neal; the cast featured Kenny Maclin as Zanna, Egan Carroll as Steve, Tessa Ogles as Kate, Zachary Gonzalez as Mike, Catt Fox as Roberta, Alex Bennett as Tank, Hannah DiMolfetto as Candi, Alex Neal as Arvin, and Hannah DiMolfetto as Loretta. The production was sponsored in part by The Kern County Board of Trade.

In April 2013, Speakeasy Theatre Ltd. produced the New Zealand premiere of Zanna, Don't! at Gryphon Theatre in Wellington. Directed by Stuart James and Musically Directed by Hayden Taylor, the cast included Jared Pallesen as Zanna, Jesse Finn as Steve, Katie Evans as Kate, Stuart James as Mike, Janelle Pollock as Roberta, Joshua Hopton-Stewart as Tank, and Hannah Bain as Candi LeRoi Kippen as Buck. True to the original Off-Broadway production, Speakeasy Theatre Ltd's Zanna, Don't! had only eight actors playing a myriad of characters and roles.

In 2014, See 'Em On Stage: A Production Company produced the New Orleans and Southern region premiere of Zanna, Don't! at the Old Marquer Theatre. Directed by Christopher Bentivegna, the show received seven New Orleans Big Easy Theatre Awards nominations, winning the award for best actor.

Zanna Don't! - The Reboot

In 2015 Tim Acito & Alexander Dinelaris presented a newly reimagined version of the musical entitled "Zanna, Redux!" at Broadway Dreams, New York City Summer Intensive. A number of major revisions were made to the show including fleshing out the story to give the characters more depth and an overall better arch. About 40% of the score was completely new and the other 60% heavily revised. 80% of the dialogue was rewritten giving the characters clearer goals, backstories, and relationships. This new version gave the authors the opportunity to tackle more hot button issues like bullying, self loathing, and intersectionality. They also rewrote the main character of Zanna to be "pangender" (non-binary) with presidential aspirations offering deeper storytelling into gender identity and political activism. In 2017 Out Front Theatre in Atlanta, GA mounted the new production now entitled "Zanna Dont: A Quantum Football Fable."

A Limited engagement concert of the rebooted version was performed at Theatre Horizon in PA on June 29 & 30 2017, and in November 2019 a European Premiere of the reboot was announced rebranded "Zanna, Don’t! A Rebooted Quantum Football Fable." The production was scheduled to open at London's Bridewell Theatre during Pride celebrations in July 2020 but was canceled due to the COVID-19 pandemic. As of 2021 there is no published recording of the updated version, nor a song list to compare the updates to the original.

== Response ==
Reviews of Off-Broadway

The New York Times wrote "Happily oblivious to everything else happening in the world, a chirpy new Off Broadway musical, Zanna, Don't! arrived at the John Houseman Theater last night with a pop score that aims to be nothing but catchy and a message that says nothing but that people should love each other. And gee whiz, wouldn't you know it? Something about its pure, sugary hopefulness satisfies a sweet tooth that many of us may have forgotten we have."

The Curtain-Up review of the Off-Broadway production in 2003 noted that "the winning score has both variety and a contemporary feel, perhaps permitting it to find a cross-generational appeal."

Reviews of the New Zealand production

Steve Gray wrote: "The show has male characters to kill for... Stuart James brings a tender sweet quality to Mike... Vocally outstanding and a strong presence on stage, he brings a strong comedic sense to the show as well. Jared Pallesen... has a really strong voice and makes the character (Zanna) a fun, yet also heart felt creation. All in all, the show itself is easily one of the strongest in the ‘gay musical’ canon, and this is a fine production that will appeal to people of all ages. Good, gay fun with many laughs and a great score well sung. Congrats to all involved."

"This show deserves to be sold out so get your tickets quick."- Wellington Reviews

"The singing and dancing were impressively professional, well supported by an unobtrusive band"- Ewen Coleman, The Dominion Post

Reviews of the UK productions

Time Out London wrote that this is "The fringe feel good show of the year", and was a Fringe Critics Choice.

A review from whatsonstage.com described the show as having "a genuine spring in its step. It is lighthearted, tuneful and thoroughly good fun, delivered by a young, zesty cast of 12, who dance and sing for all they are worth."{{}}

The British Theatre Guide wrote that "The whole cast give all they’ve got...I defy you not to like it." Mike Shearer is "sparkling".

gaydarnation.com wrote that "Zanna, Don't! is just the ticket to make the world seem fabulous again." Mike Shearer gives a "skilful performance" of "Zanna that is both campy narrator and emotional centre of the show. It doesn’t hurt that he has a fantastic voice as well. The other standout performance comes out of the ensemble. William J Cassidy as Arvin...gives a brilliant performance."

== Awards and nominations ==
Drama Desk nominations

- Best Musical
- Best Music
- Best Book
- Best Lyrics

Lucille Lortel nominations

- Outstanding Musical
- Outstanding Choreography, Devanand Janki (winner)
- Outstanding Featured Actress, Anika Larsen

Outer Critics Circle Award nomination

- Outstanding Off-Broadway Musical

Zanna, Don't! was also awarded 2003 GLAAD Media Award for Outstanding New York Theater Production and voted Favorite Off-Broadway Musical in the Broadway.com Audience Awards.
