= WTF!: Wrestling's Trashiest Fighters =

- RuPaul's Drag Race episode
- Episode no.: Season 4 Episode 2
- Presented by: RuPaul
- Original air date: February 6, 2012

Guest judges
- Rick Fox; John Salley

Episode chronology
← Previous "RuPocalypse Now!"	Next → "Glamazons vs. Champions"
- RuPaul's Drag Race season 4

"WTF!: Wrestling's Trashiest Fighters" is the second episode of the fourth season of the American television series RuPaul's Drag Race. It originally aired on February 6, 2012. The episode's main challenge tasks contestants with acting and wrestling. Rick Fox and John Salley are guest judges. Chad Michaels and Madame LaQueer are both declared winners. Lashauwn Beyond is eliminated from the competition after placing in the bottom two and losing a lip-sync contest against The Princess to "Bad Girls" by Donna Summer.

== Episode ==
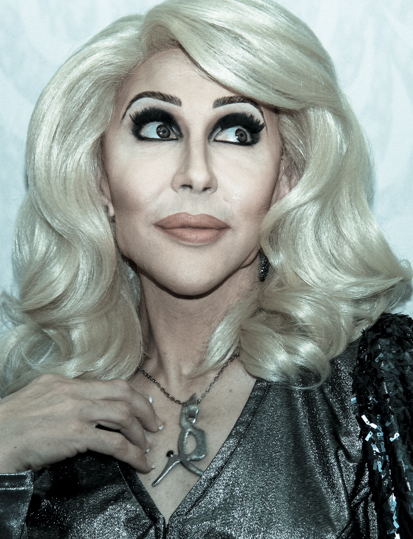
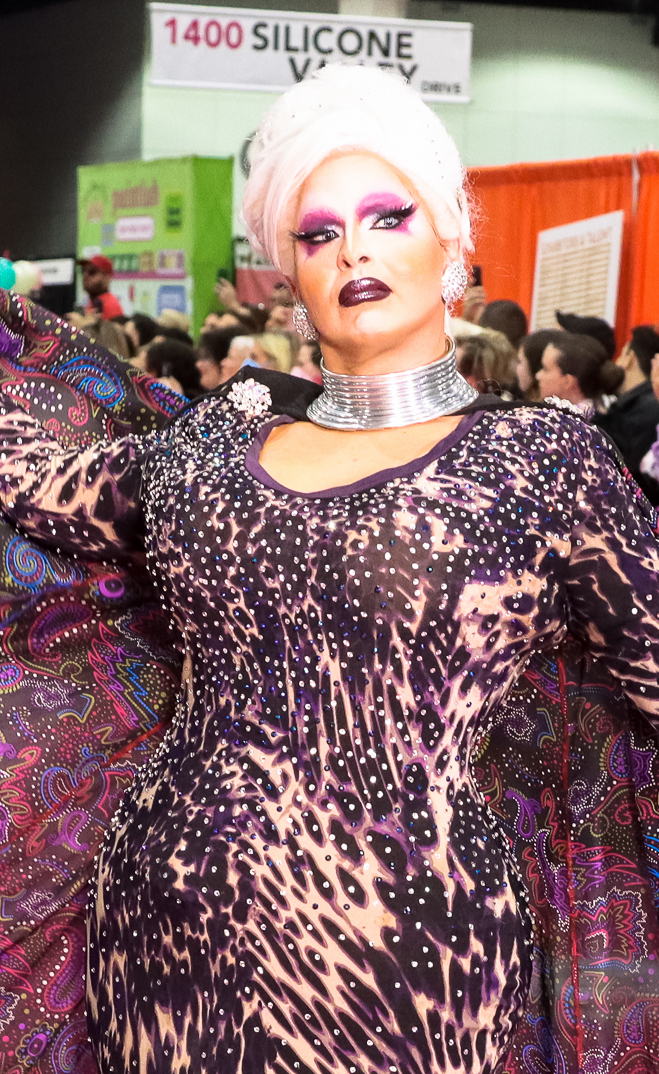
Chad Michaels (left) and Madame LaQueer (right) are the winner's of the episode's main challenge.

The contestants return to the Werk Room and see the message left by Alisa Summers after her elimination on the previous episode. RuPaul greets the group and reveals the mini-challenge, which tasks contestants with creating "badonkadonks" with padding. Members of the Pit Crew bring out materials for the contestants to use. Chad Michaels, Phi Phi O'Hara, and Willam are declared the winners. RuPaul then reveals the main challenge, which tasks contestants with creating wrestling characters (heroines and villains). The winners of the mini-challenge are captains, who select team members. Following are the teams:

- Team Chad Michaels: Chad Michaels, Madame LaQueer, Milan, and Sharon Needles
- Team Phi Phi O'Hara: Kenya Michaels, Lashauwn Beyond, Latrice Royale, and Phi Phi O'Hara
- Team Willam: DiDa Ritz, Jiggly Caliente, The Princess, and Willam

Madame LaQueer reveals she has an ankle injury. The groups begin to develop back stories and characters in the Werk Room, then practice in a wrestling ring with three wrestlers. Back in the Werk Room, RuPaul meets with each group for status updates and to offer advice. RuPaul reveals the main event's guest judges: Rick Fox and John Salley.

The main event commences, with RuPaul as a presenter. On the main stage, RuPaul welcomes fellow judges Michelle Visage and Billy B., as well as guest judges Fox and Salley. RuPaul reveals the runway category ("Girly Girl Couture"), then the fashion show commences. The judges deliver their critiques, deliberate, then share the results with the group. Team Chad Michaels is the winning team, and Chad Michaels and Madame LaQueer are both declared the winners of the main challenge. Team Phi Phi O'Hara and Team Willam are the losing teams. DiDa Ritz, Lashauwn Beyond, and The Princess receive negative critiques and DiDa Ritz is deemed safe. Lashauwn Beyond and The Princess place in the bottom and face off in a lip-sync contest to "Bad Girls" (1979) by Donna Summer. The Princess wins the lip-sync and Lashauwn Beyond is eliminated from the competition.

== Production and broadcast ==
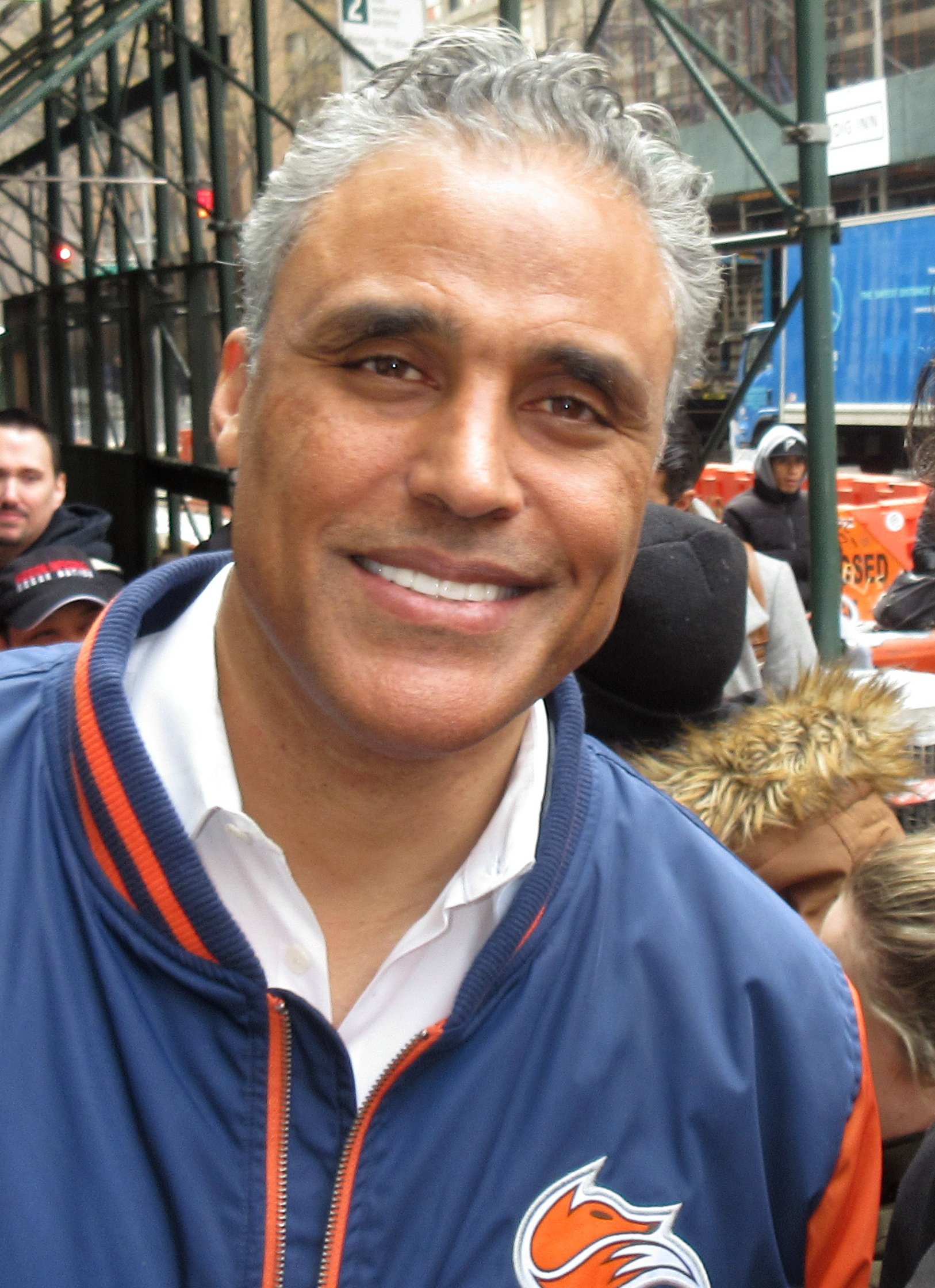
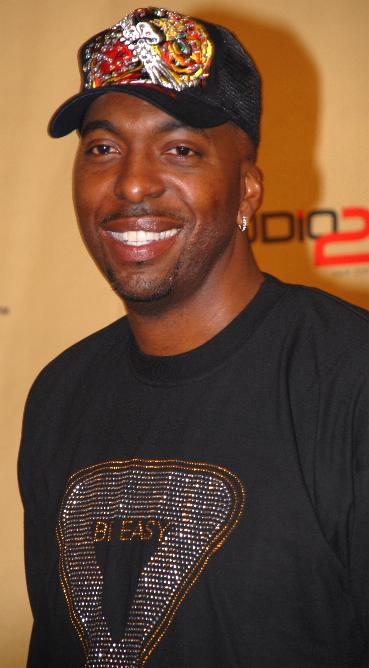
Rick Fox (left) and John Salley (right) are guest judges.

The episode originally aired on February 6, 2012.

Shawn Morales is one of the two Pit Crew members in the episode.

=== Fashion ===
For the fashion show, Kenya Michaels wears a short pink dress and a long blonde wig. Lashawn Beyond has many small balls stuck to her dress and she carries a gumball machine. Sharon Needles wears a yellow dress. Jiggly Caliente carries and sucks on a lollipop. Milan's outfit has a large bow and her shoes are red. Madame LaQueer wears an asymmetrical blonde wig. Dida Ritz has a bow in her hair. Chad Michaels wears a pink dress, white boots, and a blonde wig. The Princess presents a rock music-inspired black and pink outfit. Phi Phi O'Hara has a short dress and a large wig. Latrice Royale's outfit and shoes are pink. Willam has a short pink dress and a blonde wig.

== Reception ==
Oliver Sava of The A.V. Club gave the episode a rating of 'A-'. Zach Elborough included the wrestling challenge in Screen Rant's 2021 list of the show's top ten "wildest" challenges. Sava wrote, "Drag is not a contact sport. Except for season 4's wrestling challenge, in which the queens were literally told to battle each other to the ground... What resulted was wild, messy, and probably a health and safety nightmare... Miraculously no one was injured, but it's unlikely we'll see a WTF! sequel in the near future." In 2024, Joey Nolfi of Entertainment Weekly called the challenge a "fan-favorite" of the season. Buffy Flores ranked the "Bad Girls" performance fourth in Pride.com's 2016 list of the show's seven worst lip-syncs to date, writing: "Most lip syncs have one or two funny/memorable moments. This one has none." Kevin O'Keeffe ranked "Bad Girls" number 106 in INTO Magazine's 2018 "definitive ranking" of the show's lip-syncs to date.

== See also ==
- Wrestling in the United States
