= Anika Larsen =

American actress and singer (born 1973)

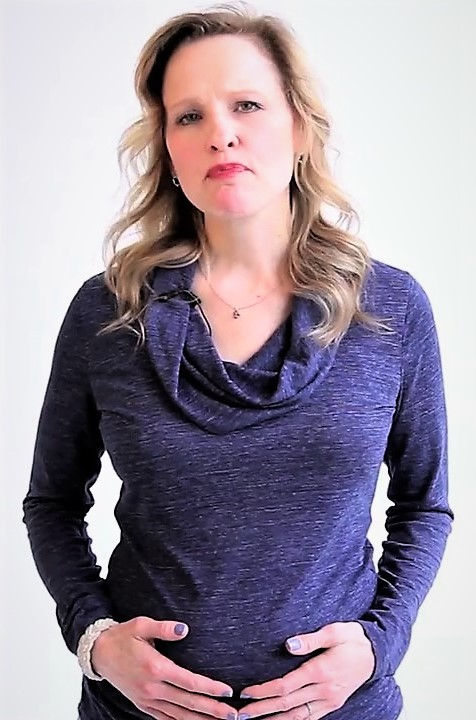
- Larsen in 2015
- Education: Yale University
- Occupation: Actress/Singer
- Years active: 1999-present
- Spouse: Freddie Maxwell (m. 2015)
- Children: 2
- Website: Official website

Anika Larsen is an American actress and singer. She was nominated for the Tony Award for Best Featured Actress in a Musical in 2014 for portraying Cynthia Weil in Beautiful: The Carole King Musical. Larsen has made an album of recordings titled, Sing You To Sleep.

== Personal life ==
Larsen was raised in Cambridge, Massachusetts in a blended family of adopted children, from Cambodia, Vietnam, and America. She studied theatre at Yale University and performed in the a cappella choir, Shades.

In 2015 she married musician Freddie Maxwell and gave birth to their first child, a son named Kie Larsen Maxwell. In 2017, she gave birth to their second son, Ashe.

== Career ==
Larsen made her Broadway debut in 2000 in the ensemble of Rent. In 2002 she originated the role of Roberta in the cult Off-Broadway musical, Zanna, Don't!, for which she received a Lucille Lortel Award nomination for Best Featured Actress in a Musical.

In 2005 she again appeared on Broadway in the ensemble of All Shook Up and in 2007 performed in the original Broadway ensemble of Xanadu. She has also performed in Avenue Q playing the role of Lucy the Slut/Kate Monster on National Tour, Broadway, and Off-Broadway.

In 2019, The Old Globe Theatre premiered the musical Almost Famous, based on the Cameron Crowe film of the same name, with additional music and lyrics by Tom Kitt, with Larsen starring as Elaine Miller (played by Frances McDormand in the film.

Larsen is the founder of the Jaradoa Theatre Company, which combines performance with community service. In 2009 a musical based on her own life, titled Shafrika: The White Girl, dealing with her experiences of living with a blended adoptive family, was staged at the Vineyard Theatre.

== Stage ==
Year	Title	Role	Venue	Ref.
2000	Rent	Ensemble	Broadway - Nederlander Theatre	
2003	Zanna, Don't!	Roberta	Off-Broadway - John Houseman Theater	
2005	All Shook Up	Ensemble	Broadway - Palace Theatre	
2005	Miracle Brothers	Juan	Off-Broadway - Vineyard Theatre	
2006	Godspell	Performer	Regional - Paper Mill Playhouse	
2006	How to Save the World and Find True Love in 90 Minutes	Julie Lemmon	Off-Broadway, New World Stages	
2007	Xanadu	Euterpe, Siren, '40s Singer, Thetis	Broadway - Helen Hayes Theatre	
2009	Shafrika, The White Girl	Herself, Bookwriter, Composer, Lyricist	Off-Broadway, Vineyard Theatre	
2009	Avenue Q	Lucy The Slut, Kate Monster	Broadway - John Golden Theatre	
2012	Disaster!	Sister Mary Downey	Off-Broadway - Triad Theatre	
2012	Myths and Hymns	Performer	Off-Broadway, Prospect Theatre Company	
2012	Closer Than Ever	Performer	Off-Broadway, The York Theatre Company	
2013	Unbroken Circle	Edna	Off-Broadway - St. Luke's Theatre	
2014	Beautiful: The Carole King Musical	Cynthia Weil	Broadway - Stephen Sondheim Theatre	
2019	Almost Famous	Elaine Miller	Regional - The Old Globe Theatre	
2022	Almost Famous	Elaine Miller	Broadway - Bernard B. Jacobs Theatre	

== Awards and nominations ==
Year	Award	Category	Work	Result	Ref.
2003	Lucille Lortel Awards	Outstanding Featured Actress in a Musical	Zanna, Don't!	Nominated	
2014	Drama Desk Awards	Outstanding Featured Actress in a Musical	Beautiful: The Carole King Musical	Won	
2014	Tony Awards	Best Featured Actress in a Musical	Beautiful: The Carole King Musical	Nominated	
2014	Outer Critics Circle Awards	Outstanding Featured Actress in a Musical	Beautiful: The Carole King Musical	Nominated	
