= Lashauwn Beyond =

American drag performer and costume designer

- Born: November 11, 1989 (age 36)
- Occupations: Drag queen; costume designer
- Television: RuPaul's Drag Race (season 4)

Lashauwn Beyond (born November 11, 1989) is an American drag performer and costume designer who competed on season 4 of RuPaul's Drag Race. A catchphrase she said in an argument with fellow contestant Jiggly Caliente on the companion show RuPaul's Drag Race: Untucked, "This is not RuPaul's Best Friend Race", became a meme and a part of the franchise's history. Lashauwn Beyond is based in Florida and continues to design outfits for Drag Race contestants.

== Early life and education ==
Lashauwn Beyond is from Florida. She attended Piper High School in Sunrise.

== Drag career ==
Lashauwn Beyond is a drag performer and costume designer. She became interested in drag at age 18, and took the name for her drag persona from her younger sister, Lashauwn. She wanted to audition for Drag Race when she was 20 years old, but had to wait until she was 21 because of the show's age requirements. Lashauwn Beyond competed on season 4 (2012) of RuPaul's Drag Race at the age of 21, placing twelfth overall. She has reportedly kept a low profile since then. She has designed outfits for other contestants, including Latrice Royale of season 4 and Malaysia Babydoll Foxx of season 15 (2023).

=== RuPaul's Drag Race ===
According to Screen Rant, Lashauwn Beyond "showed great promise" on the premiere episode ("RuPocalypse Now!"), which tasked contestants with creating a post-apocalyptic look. She was eliminated on the second episode, which had a wrestling challenge, after placing in the bottom two and losing a lip-sync contest against The Princess to "Bad Girls" (1979) by Donna Summer. Lashauwn Beyond removed her shoes during the performance, against RuPaul's preference. In 2017, Thrillist's Brian Moylan ranked her number 69 out of the show's 113 contestants to date. Hanne Low included her in Screen Rant's 2018 list of thirteen contestants eliminated too soon. In The Spinoff's 2019 "definitive ranking" of Drag Race lip-syncs to date, Sam Brooks ranked the battle number 146 out of 162. Buffy Flores included the lip-sync in Pride.com's 2023 list of the show's seven worst of all time, writing: "Most lip syncs have one or two funny/memorable moments. This one has none."

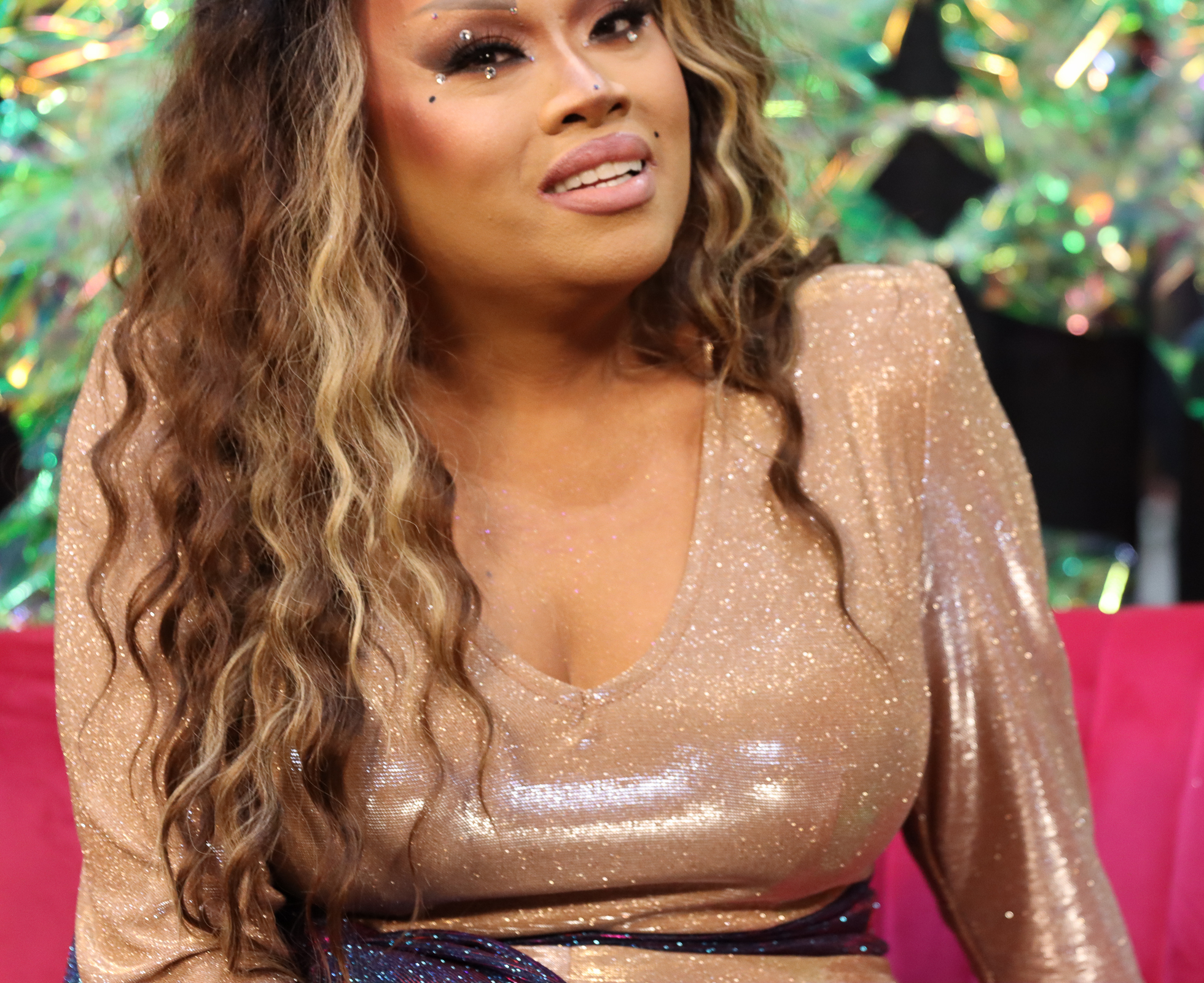
Lashauwn Beyond is known for a catchphrase she said in an argument with fellow contestant Jiggly Caliente (pictured at RuPaul's DragCon LA in 2023)

On the first episode of the companion series RuPaul's Drag Race: Untucked, Lashauwn Beyond and fellow contestant Jiggly Caliente got into an argument after Lashauwn Beyond called Jiggly Caliente out for not knowing how to sew, and Jiggly Caliente was offended that Lashauwn Beyond did not share her thoughts about her look. Lashauwn Beyond said to Jiggly Caliente, "This is not RuPaul's Best Friend Race". The catchphrase became a meme and has been repeated on subsequent seasons of Drag Race. In 2018, Michael Cuby included the argument in Them's list of the ten "messiest fights" in Untucked history, and the online magazine's John Paul Brammer said she should receive royalty payments for coining the catchphrase. The catchphrase was also included in IN Magazine's 2019 list of the show's seven best to date, as well as Pride.com's 2023 list of ten Drag Race memes "that belong in the Hall of Fame". In 2023, Cailyn Szelinski of Screen Rant wrote, "Lashawun Beyond may not have been a part of season 4 for long, but she did leave her mark on the show by being a part of one of the most heated backstage fights during Untucked ... and made herself a permanent part of Drag Race herstory."

== Personal life ==
Lashauwn Beyond has lived in Plantation and Fort Lauderdale. She came out as a trans woman following her appearance on Drag Race. She is the "drag mother" of Malaysia Babydoll Foxx.

Outside of her drag career, Lashauwn Beyond has run her own sewing business.

== Filmography ==
=== Television ===
Year	Title	Role
2012	RuPaul's Drag Race (season 4)	Contestant (12th place)
2012	RuPaul's Drag Race: Untucked	Herself
