= Cassidy Janson =

British actress (born 1980)

- Born: 30 July 1980 (age 46); High Barnet, London, England
- Education: London Studio Centre; Millennium Dance; The Impulse Company
- Occupation: Actress
- Years active: 2005–present
- Website: cassidyjanson.com

Cassidy Janson (born 30 July 1980) is a British actress, known for her work in musical theatre. She won the 2020 Olivier Award for Best Supporting Performance in a Musical for & Juliet.

== Stage career ==
In 2005 Janson appeared in Tick, Tick... Boom! at the Menier Chocolate Factory. She played Susan, alongside Neil Patrick Harris as Jonathan and Tee Jaye as Michael. In 2006 she joined the original West End cast of Wicked as part of the ensemble, later moving to be standby for the role of Elphaba. Following this, she joined the final West End cast of Avenue Q as Kate Monster/Lucy the Slut. In 2011 she originated the role of Maggie Saunders in the musical version of Lend me a Tenor. She appears on the original cast recording.

Janson has appeared in several shows Off-West End, including Company at the Southwark Playhouse (as Amy), Rooms: A Rock Romance at the Finborough Theatre (as Monica), and Blood Wedding at the Courtyard Theatre

In 2013 she returned to the Menier Chocolate Factory in Candide, playing the role of Paquette. Following this, she played Ruth in Dessa Rose at the Trafalgar Studios, alongside Cynthia Erivo as Dessa.

On 30 November 2015 Janson took over the role of Carole King in the West End production of Beautiful: The Carole King Musical. She joined Carole King at the British Summer Time concerts to perform I Feel The Earth Move. She remained with the production until it closed on 5 August 2017.

In 2018 she appeared in a revival of Chess as Florence at the London Colosseum, alongside Michael Ball as Anatoly, Alexandra Burke as Svetlana, and Tim Howar as Freddie.

In April 2019 she appeared in Man of La Mancha at the London Colosseum, sharing the roles of Aldonza and Dulcinea with Danielle de Niese. The production played a limited run to 8 June 2019. Following this, she was cast in the new musical & Juliet at the Shaftesbury Theatre, as Anne Hathaway. Janson won an Olivier Award in the category of Best Supporting Actress in a Musical for her performance of Anne Hathaway.

In 2026 Janson was cast in the upcomng musical adaptation of Burlesque. Beginning October 28, Janson is set to take over for Millicent Clyde in the West End production of Paddington: The Musical.

== Leading Ladies ==
In 2017 Janson teamed up with Beverley Knight and Amber Riley to form a musical theatre supergroup, known collectively as the "Leading Ladies". Their debut album, Songs from the Stage, was released on 17 November 2017 and features covers songs from Cats, Beautiful and Rent among others.

== Debut album ==
Cassidy Janson announced via her Twitter in late 2018 that she had signed a record deal with BMG. In April 2019 Janson announced that her debut album Cassidy would be released on 14 June. It features 14 new songs, 12 co-written by Janson herself, and new song written for her by legend and friend Carole King.

== Personal life ==
Cassidy Janson often appears on stage with The Jive Aces as a guest performer.

== Awards ==
Year	Award	Category	Nominated work	Result	Ref.
2020	Laurence Olivier Awards	Best Actress in a Supporting Role in a Musical	& Juliet	Won	
