= Beautiful: The Carole King Musical =

2014 jukebox musical

- 2014 Broadway Playbill
- Music: Various Artists
- Lyrics: Various Artists
- Book: Douglas McGrath
- Basis: The songs of Carole King
- Premiere: October 8, 2013: Curran Theatre, San Francisco
- Productions: 2013 San Francisco; 2014 Broadway; 2015 West End; 2015 U.S. Tour; 2017 UK Tour; 2017 Australian Tour; 2020 U.K. Tour

Beautiful: The Carole King Musical is a jukebox musical with a book by Douglas McGrath with songs by Carole King with Gerry Goffin, Barry Mann with Cynthia Weil, and others. The musical is a biographical piece depicting King’s songwriting career from her hiring at Aldon Music in 1958 to her debut performance in 1971, including her marriage to Goffin and their friendships with Mann and Weil.

The original production of Beautiful received its world premiere at the Curran Theatre, San Francisco, in October 2013, with direction by Marc Bruni and choreography by Josh Prince, and starring Jessie Mueller in a Tony Award-winning performance as Carole King and Jake Epstein as Gerry Goffin. It made its Broadway debut at the Stephen Sondheim Theatre in January 2014. A West End production starring Katie Brayben as Carole began in February 2015. In March 2022, a new version of the production was launched for a UK tour from the Leicester Curve.

== Productions ==
=== San Francisco (2013) ===
The show had its pre-Broadway try-out in San Francisco, California, at the Curran Theatre from September 24, 2013 through October 20, with an official opening October 8. The production was staged by Marc Bruni, with choreography by Josh Prince and musical direction by Jason Howland. Jessie Mueller played Carole King. The musical sold out its entire run at the Curran Theatre.

=== Broadway (2014–2019) ===
The musical opened on Broadway at the Stephen Sondheim Theatre on January 12, 2014, after previews from November 12, 2013. In addition to Mueller as King, the cast featured Jake Epstein as Gerry Goffin, Anika Larsen as Cynthia Weil and Jarrod Spector as Barry Mann. King attended the April 3, 2014 performance and appeared on stage with the cast at the curtain call, singing "You've Got a Friend" together with them. Carole also surprised actress and singer Melissa Benoist during her run as the titular character, praising her for her performance, and sang a reprise of "I Feel the Earth Move" with her and the audience on July 27, 2018. On the fifth anniversary of the production's opening on January 12, 2019, Carole King appeared on stage to perform the show's closing number "Beautiful" and finale alongside star Chilina Kennedy. The production closed on October 27, 2019 after 60 previews and 2,418 regular performances. Upon closing, the production was the 27th longest-running musical in Broadway history.

==== Producers ====
The producers of the original Broadway production include: Paul Blake, Sony/ATV Music Publishing, Jeffery A. Sine, Richard A. Smith, Mike Bosner, Harriet Newman Leve, Elaine Krauss, Terry Schnuck, Orin Wolf, Patty Baker, Roger Faxon, Larry Magrid, Kit Seidel, Lawrence S. Toppall, Fakston Productions, Mary Soloman, William C. Cohen, John Gore, Barbara Freitag, Loraine Alterman Boyle, Matthew C. Blank, Tim Hogue, Joel Hyatt, Marianne Mills, Michael J. Moritz Jr., StylesFour Production, Corey Brunish, Brisa Trinchero, Jeremiah J. Harris, Sherry Kondor (Executive Producer), Christine Russell (Executive Producer).

=== West End (2015–2017) ===
A production in London's West End opened on February 25, 2015, following previews beginning February 10, 2015, at the Aldwych Theatre. On September 25, 2014, it was announced that British actress Katie Brayben would take the lead role of Carole King, with further casting including Alan Morrissey as Gerry Goffin, Gary Trainor as Don Kirshner, Glynis Barber as Genie Klein, Lorna Want as Cynthia Weil and Ian McIntosh as Barry Mann. Beginning November 30, 2015, Cassidy Janson took the lead role of Carole King and Diane Keen replaced Glynis Barber in the role of Genie Klein. it was announced on May 23, 2017 that the London production would close August 5, 2017.

=== U.S. National Tours ===
The musical began a U.S. tour starting in September 2015 in Providence, Rhode Island, at the Providence Performing Arts Center, with engagements across the United States, ending in San Francisco in August 2016. The role of Carole King was played by Abby Mueller (the sister of Jessie Mueller), with Liam Tobin as Gerry Goffin, Ben Fankhauser as Barry Mann and Becky Gulsvig as Cynthia Weil.

A second U.S. National tour began September 4, 2018 at the Ellie Caulkins Opera House in Denver, CO. The role of Carole King was played by Sarah Bockel, with Dylan S. Wallach as Gerry Goffin, Alison Whitehurst as Cynthia Weil, and Jacob Heimer as Barry Mann.

=== UK National Tours ===
A UK tour began September 2017 at the Alhambra Theatre in Bradford and ended at the New Theatre in Oxford in May 2018, starring former Over the Rainbow contestant Bronté Barbé as Carole King.

A second U.K tour began on January 11, 2020, at Churchill Theatre in Bromley, and was set to run until June 2020 but the tour was cut short due to the ongoing COVID-19 pandemic. Before the tour permanently closed, the role of Carole King was played by Daisy Wood-Davis, with Adam Gillian as Gerry Goffin, Laura Baldwin as Cynthia Weil, and Cameron Sharp as Barry Mann.

A third U.K Tour opened at the Curve Theatre, Leicester on 28 February 2022. Produced by the Made at Curve, Theatre Royal Bath and Mayflower Southampton, directed by Nikolai Foster, the production is choreographed by Leah Hill, with a creative team featuring set designer Frankie Bradshaw, costume designer Edd Lindley, lighting designer and Curve associate Ben Cracknell, sound designer Tom Marshall, associate director Jennifer Lane Baker and casting director and Curve Associate Kay Magson CDG. The role of Carole King is played by Molly-Grace Cutler (The Worst Witch) with Tom Milner (Holby City) as Gerry Goffin, while Seren Sandham-Davies (Crazy For You) and Jos Slovick (Once) will play husband and wife song-writing duo Cynthia Weil and Barry Mann. After its run in Leicester the show visited Bath, Brighton, Edinburgh, Southampton, Newcastle, Dartford, Malvern, Cambridge, Cardiff, Eastbourne, Birmingham, Sheffield, Glasgow, Belfast, Nottingham, Manchester, Blackpool, Peterborough, Coventry, Cheltenham and Liverpool, finishing at the New Theatre, Oxford on 26 November 2022. This new version of the show received positive reviews.

=== Australian Tour (2017–2018) ===
An Australian tour began in Sydney on 24 September 2017 at the Lyric Theatre. Esther Hannaford led the production, playing Carole King. The musical opened in Melbourne at Her Majesty's Theatre on 22 February 2018. In Brisbane, performances began at the Lyric Theatre, QPAC on Friday 13 July 2018 running through to Sunday 2 September 2018.

=== Other notable productions ===
Ogunquit Playhouse in Ogunquit, Maine, produced the US Regional Theatre Premiere, which played September 30, 2022 through October 30, 2022. The production starred Sarah Bockel as Carole King, Taylor Aronson as Cynthia Weil, Anthony Festa as Gerry Goffin, Suzanne Grodner as Genie Klein, Ben Jacoby as Barry Mann, and Matt Loehr as Don Kirschner. The production was directed by David Ruttura and choreographed by Joyce Chittick, recreating the original Broadway direction by Marc Bruni and choreography by Josh Prince. Nick Williams served as musical director.

Paper Mill Playhouse in Millburn, NJ produced a new staging by Casey Hushion, which played June 5, 2024 - July 3, 2024. The production starred Kyra Kennedy as Carole King, Samantha Massell as Cynthia Weil, Marrick Smith as Gerry Goffin, Jacob Ben-Shmuel as Barry Mann, Suzanne Grodner as Genie Klein, and Bryan Fenkart as Don Kirschner. Choreography by Jen Werner and musical direction by Wendy Bobbitt Cavett. https://www.jerseyarts.com/stories/beautiful-carole-king-musical-extends-its-run-paper-mill-playhouse

The Green Room Community Theatre in Newton, North Carolina, produced the North Carolina Community Theatre Premiere, which played September 1, 2023 through September 17, 2023. The production starred Carol Anne Hartman as Carole King, Holley Dagenhardt as Cynthia Weil, Corey Knighton as Gerry Goffin, Rachel Knighton as Genie Klein, Lucas DeVore as Barry Mann, and Mark Rose as Don Kirschner. The production was directed and music directed by Jeff Hartman and choreographed by Gina Duckworth.

Pitlochry Festival Theatre included Beautiful - the Carole King Musical as part of its 2024 summer repertory season. It was directed by Sam Hardie and starred Olivier-nominated Kirsty Findlay as Carole King. The production was nominated for 3 CATS Awards including a win for Findlay in the Outstanding Performance category.

The Muny in St. Louis, Missouri (the oldest and largest outdoor theater in the US) produced a critically acclaimed production with performances from June 12 – 18, 2024. The production was directed by Tony and Drama Desk-nominated director Marcia Milgrom Dodge. The cast included Sara Sheperd (Carole King), Steven Good (Gerry Goffin), Jackie Burns (Cynthia Weil), and Jarrod Spector (Barry Mann). The show has other ties to The Muny and St. Louis. The original Broadway production was conceived in St. Louis when former Muny Executive Producer Paul Blake, who worked at The Muny for 22-years, developed the idea for a show based on Carole King’s music and life story. Blake became the lead producer on the project.

== Synopsis ==
From the Beautiful: The Carole King Musical cast recording booklet

=== Act I ===
At Carnegie Hall in 1971, Carole King sings "So Far Away". Then, in Brooklyn 1958, 16-year-old Carole tells her mother, Genie, she is going into Manhattan to try to sell a song to music publisher Donnie Kirshner. In the long tradition of mothers, Genie is opposed to her daughter's wish and in the equally long tradition of teenagers not caring about their mother's opinion, Carole goes anyway. At 1650 Broadway, she hears the "1650 Broadway Medley". She then sings her new song "It Might As Well Rain Until September". Donnie says he will take it and hopes she has others. At Queens College, Carole meets a handsome young lyricist named Gerry Goffin. They agree to collaborate, musically and romantically, which in both cases turns out to be a fertile arrangement. When they go to Donnie's to play their new song, Carole confesses to Gerry that she is pregnant. Gerry asks her to marry him. It gives her an extra depth of feeling when she sings their new song for Donnie, "Some Kind of Wonderful", which The Drifters then record.

They get an office at 1650. While there, Carole meets a new lyricist Cynthia Weil ("Happy Days Are Here Again"), who is looking for a composer to work with. Gerry and Carole sing their new song "Take Good Care of My Baby", during which Barry Mann, the composer with the office next door, enters. Barry meets Cynthia and they decide to collaborate. As they begin to work, sparks fly. Donnie tells them he needs a song for the Shirelles. The couples compete for the job. In Donnie's office the next morning, Carole and Gerry present "Will You Love Me Tomorrow". Cynthia and Barry perform "He's Sure the Boy I Love". Donnie picks Carole and Gerry's song for The Shirelles and it goes to no. 1. And so, on either side of the same wall, a competition is born. The two teams turn out an amazing parade of songs: "Up on the Roof", "On Broadway", "The Loco-Motion" and "You've Lost That Lovin' Feelin'".

Gerry and Carole are at the taping of a TV special where their new song, "One Fine Day", is being performed by the dazzling Janelle Woods. During a break, Gerry confesses to Carole that he is restless in their marriage. He wants to sleep with Janelle, and he doesn't want to lie about it. Carole is stunned. As the song begins again, she takes it over and sings it herself.

=== Act II ===
Carole is in a recording studio doing a demo of "Chains". Gerry is off with Janelle but tells her he will meet her later. Nick, a guitarist, asks Carole to come sing at the Bitter End sometime but she declines — she's a songwriter, not a singer. The thing with Gerry is getting her down so she goes and talks to Cynthia who is also having trouble with Barry — they split up. Carole decides to tell Gerry he has to end the affair with Janelle. As she leaves, Barry comes in. He and Cynthia make up and play their new song, "Walking in the Rain". Gerry shows up, but he is not making sense. He eventually has a breakdown. At the hospital, he tells Carole he will end the affair with Janelle and that he wants to come home. She suggests they make a new start and move to the suburbs ("Pleasant Valley Sunday").

Barry, Cynthia and Donnie come to see the new house. Barry plays their new song, "We Gotta Get Out of This Place". Depressed that he and Carole can't do as well, Gerry leaves in a funk for the city. While he is gone, it comes out that Barry and Cynthia have seen him with another woman, a singer named Marilyn Wald. Carole goes to Marilyn's apartment and Gerry is there. It's the final straw, and she ends their marriage. At the Bitter End, where Barry and Cynthia hear their song "Uptown", Carole explains she went to Los Angeles for a vacation and has started writing on her own. Nick, the guitarist from the studio who asked her to sing with his group, is playing there and urges her to sing. She sings her new song, "It's Too Late". She decides to move to Los Angeles. At 1650, she says goodbye to Donnie, Barry and Cynthia and plays them a parting present "You've Got a Friend".

In Los Angeles, she records her album, Tapestry. The session goes well until the last song, which she is afraid to sing. It's a song she wrote with Gerry and she is afraid of the feelings it may stir up. Her producer, Lou Adler, persuades her. She sings "(You Make Me Feel Like) A Natural Woman". The album is a smash. Carole is at Carnegie Hall for her concert, and is met by Gerry, who apologizes for the way he mistreated her in the past and gives her a final prediction - "you're going all the way". Carole takes to the piano, and performs for her audience.

== Music ==
=== Musical numbers ===
Act 1

- "So Far Away" - Carole King
- "Oh Carol" - Neil Sedaka†
- "1650 Broadway Medley" - Ensemble
- "It Might as Well Rain Until September" - Carole King
- "Be-Bop-A-Lula" - Ensemble†
- "Some Kind of Wonderful" - Carole King, Gerry Goffin and The Drifters
- "Happy Days Are Here Again" - Cynthia Weil
- "Take Good Care of My Baby" - Gerry Goffin and Carole King
- "Who Put the Bomp" - Barry Mann†
- "Will You Love Me Tomorrow" - Carole King
- "He's Sure the Boy I Love" - Cynthia Weil and Barry Mann
- "Will You Love Me Tomorrow" - The Shirelles
- "Up on the Roof" - Gerry Goffin and The Drifters
- "On Broadway" - The Drifters
- "The Locomotion" - Little Eva and Ensemble
- "You've Lost That Lovin' Feeling" - Barry Mann and The Righteous Brothers
- "One Fine Day" - Janelle, Backup Singers and Carole King

Act 2

- "Chains" - Carole King and Ensemble
- "Walking in the Rain" - Barry Mann and Cynthia Weil
- "Pleasant Valley Sunday" - Marilyn Wald, Gerry Goffin and Ensemble
- "We Gotta Get Out of This Place" - Barry Mann
- "Will You Love Me Tomorrow" (Reprise) - Carole King†
- "Uptown" - "Uptown" Singer and Ensemble
- "It's Too Late" - Carole King and Ensemble
- "You've Got a Friend" - Carole King, Barry Mann, Cynthia Weil and Don Kirshner
- "(You Make Me Feel Like) A Natural Woman" - Carole King and Ensemble
- "Beautiful" - Carole King and Company
- "I Feel the Earth Move" - Carole King and Company

† Not included on the original Broadway Cast Album.

=== Orchestra ===
The musical uses a 12-member orchestra consisting of three keyboards, two guitars, bass, drums, percussion, two reeds, trumpet/flugelhorn, and trombone/bass trombone. In addition, the performer playing Carole King plays the piano or mimes as another performer plays.

=== Recordings ===
The Broadway cast album was recorded in February 2014 by Ghostlight Records and was released in digital form on April 1, 2014. It was in stores as of May 13, 2014. (The Broadway cast album includes the song "You've Got a Friend", although that song is not listed in the opening night playbill.) The album was also released on a vinyl format.

== Principal roles and original casts ==
Character	Broadway	West End	U.S. Tour	U.K. Tour	Australian Tour	Second U.S. Tour	Second U.K. Tour	Third U.K. Tour	Pitlochry Festival Theatre
Character	2014	2015		2017		2018	2020	2022	2024
Carole King	Jessie Mueller	Katie Brayben	Abby Mueller	Bronté Barbé	Esther Hannaford	Sarah Bockel	Daisy Wood-Davis	Molly Grace-Cutler	Kirsty Findlay
Gerry Goffin	Jake Epstein	Alan Morrissey	Liam Tobin	Kane Oliver Parry	Josh Piterman	Dylan S. Wallach	Adam Gillian	Tom Milner	Connor Going
Cynthia Weil	Anika Larsen	Lorna Want	Becky Gulsvig	Amy Ellen Richardson	Amy Lehpamer	Alison Whitehurst	Laura Baldwin	Seren Sandham-Davies	Lola Aluko
Barry Mann	Jarrod Spector	Ian McIntosh	Ben Fankhauser	Matthew Gonsalves	Mat Verevis	Jacob Heimer	Cameron Sharp	Jos Slovick	Theo Diedrick
Don Kirshner	Jeb Brown	Gary Trainor	Curt Bouril	Adam Howden	Mike McLeish	James Clow	Oliver Boot	Garry Robson	Robin Simpson
Genie Klein	Liz Larsen	Glynis Barber	Suzanne Grodner	Carol Royle	Anne Wood	Suzanne Grodner	Susie Fenwick	Clare Greenway	Wendy Paver
Betty	Rebecca LaChance	Joanna Woodward	Sarah Bockel	Leigh Lothian	Stefanie Caccamo	Elise Vannerson	Vicki Manser	Sorrel Jordan	Charlotte Grayson
Neil Sedaka/Righteous Brother/Lou Adler	Kevin Duda	Ed Currie	John Michael Dias	Ben Morris	Jason Arrow	John Michael Dias	Jordan Fox	Dan de Cruz; Kevin Yates	Chris Coxon; Luke Wilson
Lucille/Shirelle/"One Fine Day" Backup Singer	Carly Hughes	Danielle Steers	Salisha Thomas	Paige Miller	Ruva Ngwenya	Marla Louissant	—N/a	Naomi Alade	Signe Larsson
The Drifters	E. Clayton Cornelious; Douglas Lyons; Arbender J. Robinson; James Harkness	—N/a	—N/a	Matthew Elliot Campbell; Khalid Daley; Matt Mills; Simeon Montague	—N/a	Nathan Andrew Riley; Dimitri Joseph Moise; Michael Stiggers, Jr. Deon Releford Lee	—N/a	Kemi Clarke; Myles Miller; Kevin Yates; Dylan Gordon-Jones	Theo Diedrick; Myles Miller; Luke Wilson
Shirelle/Janelle Woods	Rashidra Scott	Tanisha Spring	Rebecca E. Covington	Jessica Joslin	Akina Edmonds	McKynleigh Alden Abraham	—N/a	Louise Francis	Nina Kristofferson
Shirelle/Little Eva/"One Fine Day" Backup Singer	Ashley Blanchet	Lucy St. Louis	Ashley Blanchet	Esme Laudat	Chloé Zuel	Alexis Tidwell	Leah St. Luce	Amena El-Kindy	Charlotte Grayson
Shirelle/"One Fine Day" Backup Singer/"Uptown" Singer	Alysha Deslorieux	Tanya Nicole-Edwards	Britney Coleman	Paige Miller	Rebecca Selley	Deanne Stewart	—N/a	Naomi Alade	Nina Kristofferson
Righteous Brother/Nick	Josh Davis	Dylan Turner	Andrew Brewer	Grant McConvey	Andrew Cook	Paul Scanlan	Grant McConvey	Peter Mooney	Luke Thornton
Marilyn Wald	Sara King	Vivien Carter	DeLaney Westfall	Emma Lucia	Naomi Price	Aashley Morgan	Carly Cook	Sorrel Jordan	Elizabeth Rowe
Swings		Aisha Jawando, Leigh Lothian, Michael Duke, Andy Coxon, Hannah Jay Allen, Rosie, Dylan Turner						Chris Coxon, Jessica Jolleys, Adrien Spencer, Jordan Louis Fernand	—N/a

=== Notable cast replacements ===
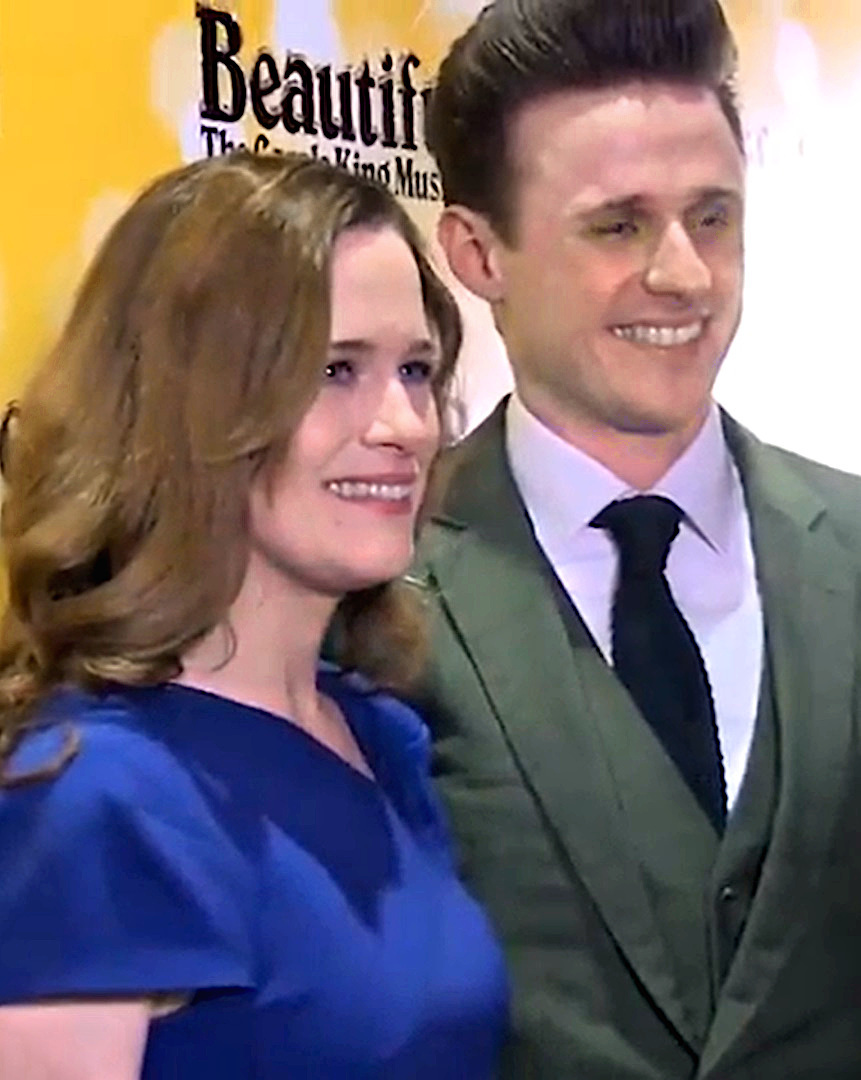
Katie Brayben and Alan Morrissey, who originated the West End versions of King and Goffin, at the Aldwych Theatre, London in 2015

==== Broadway (2014–2019) ====
- Carole King: Melissa Benoist, Vanessa Carlton, Chilina Kennedy
- Cynthia Weil: Jessica Keenan Wynn, Kara Lindsay, Kate Reinders

==== West End (2015–2017) ====
- Carole King: Cassidy Janson
- Glynis Barber: Diane Keen

== Critical reception ==
Ben Brantley, reviewing for The New York Times, called the musical a "friendly, formulaic bio-musical". He wrote that the musical shows the change in King from a modest songwriter to the popular and confident performer of those songs, showing the "real, conflicted person within the reluctant star."

Jesse Green, in his review for the New York Magazine, praised the performers but criticized the book, writing that the musical does not have the "dramatic coherence of book biomusicals". Similarly, Elyse Sommer, in her review for curtainup.com, praised the performers, especially Mueller, Spector and Larsen, as well as the "shimmery lighting" and the costumes. She wrote that while the musical "doesn't hang its songs on the greatest or most suspenseful story ever told, it has enough bounce and Broadway show glitz to keep you in your seat".

== Awards and nominations ==
=== Original Broadway production ===
Year	Award	Category	Nominee	Result
2014	Tony Award	Best Musical		Nominated
2014	Tony Award	Best Book of a Musical	Douglas McGrath	Nominated
2014	Tony Award	Best Actress in a Musical	Jessie Mueller	Won
2014	Tony Award	Best Featured Actor in a Musical	Jarrod Spector	Nominated
2014	Tony Award	Best Featured Actress in a Musical	Anika Larsen	Nominated
2014	Tony Award	Best Orchestrations	Steve Sidwell	Nominated
2014	Tony Award	Best Sound Design	Brian Ronan	Won
2014	Drama Desk Award	Outstanding Musical		Nominated
2014	Drama Desk Award	Outstanding Book of a Musical	Douglas McGrath	Nominated
2014	Drama Desk Award	Outstanding Actress in a Musical	Jessie Mueller	Won
2014	Drama Desk Award	Outstanding Featured Actress in a Musical	Anika Larsen	Won
2014	Drama Desk Award	Outstanding Orchestrations	Steve Sidwell	Nominated
2014	Drama Desk Award	Outstanding Sound Design in a Musical	Brian Ronan	Won
2015	Grammy Award	Best Musical Theater Album	Jessie Mueller (principal soloist); Jason Howland, Steve Sidwell & Billy Jay Stein (producers)	Won

=== Original London production ===
Year	Award Ceremony	Category	Nominee	Result
2015	Laurence Olivier Award	Best New Musical		Nominated
2015	Laurence Olivier Award	Best Actress in a Musical	Katie Brayben	Won
2015	Laurence Olivier Award	Best Actor in a Supporting Role in a Musical	Ian McIntosh	Nominated
2015	Laurence Olivier Award	Best Actress in a Supporting Role in a Musical	Lorna Want	Won
2015	Laurence Olivier Award	Best Theatre Choreographer	Josh Prince	Nominated
2015	Laurence Olivier Award	Best Costume Design	Alejo Vietti	Nominated
2015	Laurence Olivier Award	Best Sound Design	Brian Ronan	Nominated
2015	Laurence Olivier Award	Outstanding Achievement in Music	The Orchestra	Nominated
2016	WhatsOnStage Awards	Best New Musical		Nominated
2016	WhatsOnStage Awards	Best Actress in a Musical	Katie Brayben	Nominated

== Film adaptation ==
On March 22, 2015, it was announced that Sony Pictures would be bringing the musical to the big screen with Douglas McGrath adapting his book into a screenplay and stage producer Paul Blake producing through Tom Hanks and Gary Goetzman's production company, Playtone.

In December 2022, Daisy Edgar-Jones was cast in the lead role of the film, with Lisa Cholodenko directing from a script she co-wrote with Stuart Blumberg. By July 2024, Edgar-Jones had exited the project.
