= List of RuPaul's Drag Race episodes =

RuPaul's Drag Race is an American reality competition television series produced by World of Wonder for Logo TV. The show documents RuPaul in his search for "America's next drag superstar". Queen RuPaul plays the roles of host, mentor, and source of inspiration for this series, as contestants are given different challenges each week. RuPaul's Drag Race employs a panel of judges, including RuPaul, Michelle Visage and a host of other guest judges, who critique contestants' progress throughout the competition. The title of the show is a play on drag queen and drag racing, and the title sequence and song "Drag Race" both have a drag-racing theme.

RuPaul's Drag Race has spanned seventeen seasons and inspired the spin-off shows RuPaul's Drag U, RuPaul's Drag Race: All Stars. The show has become the highest-rated television program on Logo TV, and airs internationally, including in Australia, Canada and the UK. The show earned Rupaul a 2016 Emmy for Outstanding Host for a Reality or Reality-Competition Program, and the show itself was awarded as an Outstanding Reality Program at the 21st GLAAD Media Awards. It has been nominated for 4 Critics' Choice Television Award including Best Reality Series – Competition and Best Reality Show Host for RuPaul, and was nominated for a Creative Arts Emmy Award for Outstanding Make-up for a Multi-Camera Series or Special (Non-Prosthetic). In 2017, RuPaul's Drag Race was renewed for a tenth and eleventh seasons.

== Series overview ==
Season	Episodes	Originally released		
Season	Episodes	First released	Last released	Network
1	9	February 2, 2009	March 23, 2009	Logo TV
2	12	February 1, 2010	April 26, 2010	Logo TV
3	16	January 24, 2011	May 2, 2011	Logo TV
4	14	January 30, 2012	April 30, 2012	Logo TV
5	14	January 28, 2013	May 6, 2013	Logo TV
6	14	February 24, 2014	May 19, 2014	Logo TV
7	14	March 2, 2015	June 1, 2015	Logo TV
8	10	March 7, 2016	May 16, 2016	Logo TV
9	14	March 24, 2017	June 23, 2017	VH1
10	14	March 22, 2018	June 28, 2018	VH1
11	14	February 28, 2019	May 30, 2019	VH1
12	14	February 28, 2020	May 29, 2020	VH1
13	16	January 1, 2021	April 23, 2021	VH1
14	16	January 7, 2022	April 22, 2022	VH1
15	16	January 6, 2023	April 14, 2023	MTV
16	16	January 5, 2024	April 19, 2024	MTV
17	16	January 3, 2025	April 18, 2025	MTV
18	16	January 2, 2026	April 17, 2026	MTV

== Episodes ==
=== Season 1 (2009) ===
No. overall	No. in season	Title	Original release date
1	1	"Drag on a Dime"	February 2, 2009
2	2	"Girl Groups"	February 9, 2009
3	3	"Queens of All Media"	February 16, 2009
4	4	"Mac-Viva Glam"	February 23, 2009
5	5	"Drag School of Charm"	March 2, 2009
6	6	"The Absolut Ball"	March 9, 2009
7	7	"Extra Special Edition"	March 16, 2009
8	8	"Grand Finale"	March 23, 2009
9	9	"Reunited"	March 23, 2009

=== Season 2 (2010) ===
No. overall	No. in season	Title	Original release date
10	1	"Gone with the Window"	February 1, 2010
11	2	"Starrbootylicious"	February 8, 2010
12	3	"Country Queens"	February 15, 2010
13	4	"Snatch Game"	February 22, 2010
14	5	"Here Comes the Bride"	March 1, 2010
15	6	"Rocker Chicks"	March 8, 2010
16	7	"Once Upon a Queen"	March 22, 2010
17	8	"Golden Gals"	March 29, 2010
18	9	"The Diva Awards"	April 12, 2010
19	10	"The Main Event Clip Show"	April 19, 2010
20	11	"Grand Finale"	April 26, 2010
21	12	"Reunited"	April 26, 2010

=== Season 3 (2011) ===
No. overall	No. in season	Title	Original release date
22	1	"Casting Extravaganza"	January 24, 2011
23	2	"The Queen Who Mopped Xmas"	January 24, 2011
24	3	"Queens in Space"	January 31, 2011
25	4	"Totally Leotarded"	February 7, 2011
26	5	"QNN News"	February 14, 2011
27	6	"Snatch Game"	February 21, 2011
28	7	"Face, Face, Face of Cakes"	February 28, 2011
29	8	"Ru Ha Ha!"	March 7, 2011
30	9	"Life, Liberty and the Pursuit of Style"	March 14, 2011
31	10	"RuPaul-a-palooza"	March 21, 2011
32	11	"The Hair Ball"	March 28, 2011
33	12	"Jocks in Frocks"	April 4, 2011
34	13	"The Money Ball"	April 11, 2011
35	14	"RuPaul Rewind"	April 18, 2011
36	15	"Grand Finale"	April 25, 2011
37	16	"Reunited"	May 2, 2011

=== Season 4 (2012) ===
No. overall	No. in season	Title	Original release date
38	1	"RuPocalypse Now!"	January 30, 2012
39	2	"WTF!: Wrestling's Trashiest Fighters"	February 6, 2012
40	3	"Glamazons vs. Champions"	February 13, 2012
41	4	"Queens Behind Bars"	February 20, 2012
42	5	"Snatch Game"	February 27, 2012
43	6	"Float Your Boat"	March 5, 2012
44	7	"Dragazines"	March 12, 2012
45	8	"Frenemies"	March 19, 2012
46	9	"Frock the Vote!"	March 26, 2012
47	10	"DILFs: Dads I'd Like to Frock"	April 2, 2012
48	11	"The Fabulous Bitch Ball"	April 9, 2012
49	12	"RuPaul Rewind"	April 16, 2012
50	13	"The Final Three"	April 23, 2012
51	14	"Reunited"	April 30, 2012

=== Season 5 (2013) ===
No. overall	No. in season	Title	Original release date
52	1	"RuPaullywood or Bust"	January 28, 2013
53	2	"Lip Synch Extravaganza Eleganza"	February 4, 2013
54	3	"Draggle Rock"	February 11, 2013
55	4	"Black Swan: Why It Gotta Be Black?"	February 18, 2013
56	5	"Snatch Game"	February 25, 2013
57	6	"Can I Get an Amen?"	March 4, 2013
58	7	"RuPaul Roast"	March 11, 2013
59	8	"Scent of a Drag Queen"	March 18, 2013
60	9	"Drama Queens"	April 1, 2013
61	10	"Super Troopers"	April 8, 2013
62	11	"Sugar Ball"	April 15, 2013
63	12	"The Final Three, Hunty"	April 22, 2013
64	13	"Countdown to the Crown"	April 29, 2013
65	14	"Reunited"	May 6, 2013

=== Season 6 (2014) ===
No. overall	No. in season	Title	Original release date
66	1	"RuPaul's Big Opening"	February 24, 2014 (Note: A preview of the first episode was unveiled on February 17, showing all but the lipsync.)
67	2	"RuPaul's Big Opening: Part 2"	March 3, 2014
68	3	"Scream Queens"	March 10, 2014
69	4	"Shade: The Rusical"	March 17, 2014
70	5	"Snatch Game"	March 24, 2014
71	6	"Oh No She Betta Don't!"	March 31, 2014
72	7	"Glamazon by Colorevolution"	April 7, 2014
73	8	"Drag Queens of Comedy"	April 7, 2014
74	9	"Queens of Talk"	April 14, 2014
75	10	"Drag My Wedding"	April 21, 2014
76	11	"Glitter Ball"	April 28, 2014
77	12	"Sissy That Walk"	May 5, 2014
78	13	"Countdown to the Crown"	May 12, 2014
79	14	"Reunited!"	May 19, 2014

=== Season 7 (2015) ===
No. overall	No. in season	Title	Original release date
80	1	"Born Naked"	March 2, 2015
81	2	"Glamazonian Airways"	March 9, 2015
82	3	"ShakesQueer"	March 16, 2015
83	4	"Spoof! (There It Is)"	March 23, 2015
84	5	"The DESPY Awards"	March 30, 2015
85	6	"Ru Hollywood Stories"	April 6, 2015
86	7	"Snatch Game"	April 13, 2015
87	8	"Conjoined Queens"	April 20, 2015
88	9	"Divine Inspiration"	April 27, 2015
89	10	"Prancing Queens"	May 4, 2015
90	11	"Hello, Kitty Girls!"	May 11, 2015
91	12	"And the Rest Is Drag"	May 18, 2015
92	13	"Countdown to the Crown"	May 25, 2015
93	14	"Grand Finale"	June 1, 2015

=== Season 8 (2016) ===
No. overall	No. in season	Title	Original release date
94	1	"Keeping It 100!"	March 7, 2016
95	2	"Bitch Perfect"	March 14, 2016
96	3	"RuCo's Empire"	March 21, 2016
97	4	"New Wave Queens"	March 28, 2016
98	5	"Supermodel Snatch Game"	April 4, 2016
99	6	"Wizards of Drag"	April 11, 2016
100	7	"Shady Politics"	April 18, 2016
101	8	"RuPaul Book Ball"	April 25, 2016
102	9	"The Realness"	May 2, 2016
103	10	"Grand Finale"	May 16, 2016

=== Season 9 (2017) ===
No. overall	No. in season	Title	Original release date
104	1	"Oh. My. Gaga!"	March 24, 2017
105	2	"She Done Already Done Brought It On"	March 31, 2017
106	3	"Draggily Ever After"	April 7, 2017
107	4	"Good Morning Bitches"	April 14, 2017
108	5	"Reality Stars: The Musical"	April 21, 2017
109	6	"Snatch Game"	April 28, 2017
110	7	"9021-HO"	May 5, 2017
111	8	"RuPaul Roast"	May 12, 2017
112	9	"Your Pilot's on Fire"	May 19, 2017
113	10	"Makeovers: Crew Better Work"	May 26, 2017
114	11	"Gayest Ball Ever"	June 2, 2017
115	12	"Category Is"	June 9, 2017
116	13	"Reunited"	June 16, 2017
117	14	"Grand Finale"	June 23, 2017

=== Season 10 (2018) ===
No. overall	No. in season	Title	Original release date
118	1	"10s Across the Board"	March 22, 2018
119	2	"PharmaRusical"	March 29, 2018
120	3	"Tap That App"	April 5, 2018
121	4	"The Last Ball on Earth"	April 12, 2018
122	5	"The Bossy Rossy Show"	April 19, 2018
123	6	"Drag Con Panel Extravaganza"	April 26, 2018
124	7	"Snatch Game"	May 3, 2018
125	8	"The Unauthorized Rusical"	May 10, 2018
126	9	"Breastworld"	May 17, 2018
127	10	"Social Media Kings Into Queens"	May 24, 2018
128	11	"Evil Twins"	June 7, 2018
129	12	"American"	June 14, 2018
130	13	"Queens Reunited"	June 21, 2018
131	14	"Grand Finale"	June 28, 2018

=== Season 11 (2019) ===
No. overall	No. in season	Title	Original release date
132	1	"Whatcha Unpackin?"	February 28, 2019
133	2	"Good God Girl, Get Out"	March 7, 2019
134	3	"Diva Worship"	March 14, 2019
135	4	"Trump: The Rusical"	March 21, 2019
136	5	"Monster Ball"	March 28, 2019
137	6	"The Draglympics"	April 4, 2019
138	7	"From Farm to Runway"	April 11, 2019
139	8	"Snatch Game at Sea"	April 18, 2019
140	9	"L.A.D.P.!"	April 25, 2019
141	10	"Dragracadabra"	May 2, 2019
142	11	"Bring Back My Queens!"	May 9, 2019
143	12	"Queens Everywhere"	May 16, 2019
144	13	"Reunited"	May 23, 2019
145	14	"Grand Finale"	May 30, 2019

=== Season 12 (2020) ===
No. overall	No. in season	Title	Original release date
146	1	"I'm That Bitch"	February 28, 2020
147	2	"You Don't Know Me"	March 6, 2020
148	3	"World's Worst"	March 13, 2020
149	4	"The Ball Ball"	March 20, 2020
150	5	"Gay's Anatomy"	March 27, 2020
151	6	"Snatch Game"	April 3, 2020
152	7	"Madonna: The Unauthorized Rusical"	April 10, 2020
153	8	"Droop"	April 17, 2020
154	9	"Choices 2020"	April 24, 2020
155	10	"Superfan Makeover"	May 1, 2020
156	11	"One-Queen Show"	May 8, 2020
157	12	"Viva Drag Vegas"	May 15, 2020
158	13	"Alone Together"	May 22, 2020
159	14	"Grand Finale"	May 29, 2020

=== Season 13 (2021) ===
No. overall	No. in series	Title	Original release date
160	1	"The Pork Chop"	January 1, 2021
161	2	"Condragulations"	January 8, 2021
162	3	"Phenomenon"	January 15, 2021
163	4	"RuPaulmark Channel"	January 22, 2021
164	5	"The Bag Ball"	January 29, 2021
165	6	"Disco-mentary"	February 5, 2021
166	7	"Bossy Rossy RuBoot"	February 12, 2021
167	8	"Social Media: The Unverified Rusical"	February 19, 2021
168	9	"Snatch Game"	March 5, 2021
169	10	"Freaky Friday Queens"	March 12, 2021
170	11	"Pop! Goes the Queens"	March 19, 2021
171	12	"Nice Girls Roast"	March 26, 2021
172	13	"Henny, I Shrunk the Drag Queens!"	April 2, 2021
173	14	"Gettin' Lucky"	April 9, 2021
174	15	"Reunited"	April 16, 2021
175	16	"Grand Finale"	April 23, 2021

=== Season 14 (2022) ===
No. overall	No. in series	Title	Original release date
176	1	"Big Opening #1"	January 7, 2022
177	2	"Big Opening #2"	January 14, 2022
178	3	"A Pair of Balls"	January 21, 2022
179	4	"She's a Super Tease"	January 28, 2022
180	5	"Save a Queen"	February 4, 2022
181	6	"Glamazon Prime"	February 11, 2022
182	7	"The Daytona Wind"	February 18, 2022
183	8	"60s Girl Groups"	February 25, 2022
184	9	"Menzeses"	March 4, 2022
185	10	"Snatch Game"	March 11, 2022
186	11	"An Extra Special Episode"	March 18, 2022
187	12	"Moulin Ru: The Rusical"	March 25, 2022
188	13	"The Ross Mathews Roast"	April 1, 2022
189	14	"Catwalk"	April 8, 2022
190	15	"Reunited"	April 15, 2022
191	16	"Grand Finale"	April 22, 2022

=== Season 15 (2023) ===
No. overall	No. in series	Title	Original release date
192	1	"One Night Only, Part 1"	January 6, 2023
193	2	"One Night Only, Part 2"	January 6, 2023
194	3	"All Queens Go to Heaven"	January 13, 2023
195	4	"Supersized Snatch Game"	January 20, 2023
196	5	"House of Fashion"	January 27, 2023
197	6	"Old Friends Gold"	February 3, 2023
198	7	"The Daytona Wind 2"	February 10, 2023
199	8	"Lip Sync LaLaPaRuza Smackdown"	February 17, 2023
200	9	"The Crystal Ball"	February 24, 2023
201	10	"50/50's Most Gagworthy Stars"	March 3, 2023
202	11	"Two Queens, One Joke"	March 10, 2023
203	12	"Wigloose: The Rusical!"	March 17, 2023
204	13	"Teacher Makeovers"	March 24, 2023
205	14	"Blame It on the Edit"	March 31, 2023
206	15	"Reunited!"	April 7, 2023
207	16	"Grand Finale"	April 14, 2023

=== Season 16 (2024) ===
No. overall	No. in series	Title	Original release date
208	1	"Rate-A-Queen"	January 5, 2024
209	2	"Queen Choice Awards"	January 12, 2024
210	3	"The Mother of All Balls"	January 19, 2024
211	4	"RDR Live!"	January 26, 2024
212	5	"Girl Groups"	February 2, 2024
213	6	"Welcome to the DollHouse"	February 9, 2024
214	7	"The Sound of Rusic"	February 16, 2024
215	8	"Snatch Game"	February 23, 2024
216	9	"See You Next Wednesday"	March 1, 2024
217	10	"Werq the World"	March 8, 2024
218	11	"Corporate Queens"	March 15, 2024
219	12	"Bathroom Hunties"	March 22, 2024
220	13	"Drag Race Vegas Live! Makeovers"	March 29, 2024
221	14	"Booked and Blessed"	April 5, 2024
222	15	"Lip Sync LaLaPaRuza Smackdown – Reunited"	April 12, 2024
223	16	"Grand Finale"	April 19, 2024

=== Season 17 (2025) ===
No. overall	No. in season	Title	Original release date
224	1	"Squirrel Games"	January 3, 2025
225	2	"Drag Queens Got Talent – Part 2"	January 10, 2025
226	3	"Monopulence!"	January 17, 2025
227	4	"Bitch, I'm a Drag Queen!"	January 24, 2025
228	5	"RDR Live!"	January 31, 2025
229	6	"Let's Get Sea Sickening Ball"	February 7, 2025
229	7	"Snatch Game"	February 14, 2025
230	8	"The Wicked Wiz of Oz: The Rusical!"	February 21, 2025
231	9	"Heavens to Betsey!"	February 28, 2025
232	10	"The Villains Roast"	March 7, 2025
233	11	"Ross Mathews vs. The Ducks"	March 14, 2025
234	12	"Charisma, Uniqueness, Nerve & Talent Monologues"	March 21, 2025
235	13	"Drag Baby Mamas"	March 28, 2025
236	14	"How's Your Headliner?"	April 4, 2025
237	15	"Lip Sync Lalaparuza Smackdown"	April 11, 2025
238	16	"Grand Finale"	April 18, 2025

=== Season 18 (2026) ===
No. overall	No. in season	Title	Original release date
239	1	"You Can't Keep a Good Drag Queen Down!"	January 2, 2026
240	2	"Q-Pop Girl Groups"	January 9, 2026
241	3	"RDR Live Returns!"	January 16, 2026
242	4	"Red Carpet Mash Up"	January 23, 2026
243	5	"The Rate-A-Queen Talent Show, Part 1"	January 30, 2026
244	6	"The Rate-A-Queen Talent Show, Part 2"	February 6, 2026
245	7	"Drag Queens for Change"	February 13, 2026
246	8	"Snatch Game of Love: Island Edition"	February 20, 2026
247	9	"Fannie: The Hard Knock Ball Rusical"	February 27, 2026
248	10	"Drag in a Bag"	March 6, 2026
249	11	"A Toast to Alyssa Edwards"	March 13, 2026
250	12	"Mammas, Don't Let Your Babies Grow Up to Be Drag Queens"	March 20, 2026
251	13	"Karens Gone Wild"	March 27, 2026
252	14	"Good Morning Bitches"	April 3, 2026
253	15	"All RuPaul-A-Paruza Smackdown"	April 10, 2026
254	16	"Grand Finale"	April 17, 2026

== See also ==
- List of RuPaul's Drag Race All Stars episodes
