= Snatch Game (RuPaul's Drag Race season 4) =

- RuPaul's Drag Race episode
- Episode no.: Season 4 Episode 5
- Presented by: RuPaul
- Original air date: February 27, 2012

Guest appearances
- Loretta Devine; Ross Matthews

Episode chronology
| ← Previous "Queens Behind Bars" | Next → "Float Your Boat" |
- RuPaul's Drag Race season 4

"Snatch Game" is the fifth episode of the fourth season of the American television series RuPaul's Drag Race. It originally aired on February 27, 2012. The episode's main challenge tasks the contestants with impersonating celebrities during the Snatch Game. Loretta Devine and Ross Mathews are celebrity guests during the Snatch Game, as well as guest judges.

Chad Michaels is the winner of the main challenge. Kenya Michaels is eliminated from the competition after placing in the bottom and facing off in a lip-sync contest against Milan to "Vogue" by Madonna.

== Episode ==
The contestants return to the workroom after Madame LaQueer's elimination on the previous episode. RuPaul greets the group and reveals the mini-challenge, which tasks the contestants with competing in a game called "Beat the Cock". Phi Phi O'Hara wins the mini-challenge.

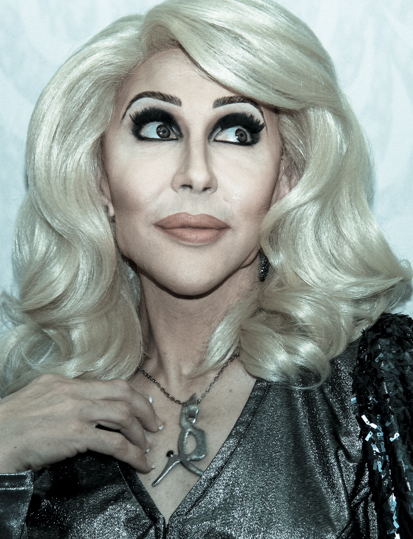
Chad Michaels (pictured) wins the episode's main challenge for impersonating American singer and actress Cher.

RuPaul then reveals the main challenge, which tasks the contestants with impersonating celebrities during the Snatch Game. The contestants start to get ready for the game. Phi Phi O'Hara gives the phone call to a loved one she earned for winning the mini-challenge to Chad Michaels. RuPaul returns to the workroom to meet with each contestant, asking questions and offering advice. Before leaving, RuPaul reveals that Loretta Devine and Ross Mathews will be the celebrity guests for the Snatch Game. The game commences with the following contestants and impersonated celebrities:

- Chad Michaels as Cher
- DiDa Ritz as Wendy Williams
- Jiggly Caliente as Snooki
- Kenya Michaels as Beyoncé
- Latrice Royale as Aretha Franklin
- Milan as Diana Ross
- Phi Phi O'Hara as Lady Gaga
- Sharon Needles as Michelle Visage
- Willam as Jessica Simpson

On elimination day, the contestants make final preparations for the fashion show. Latrice Royale expresses disappointment and embarrassment over how some of the contestants behaved during the Snatch Game. Chad Michaels calls her boyfriend Adam.

On the main stage, RuPaul welcomes fellow judges Michelle Visage and Santino Rice, as well as guest judges Devine and Mathews. RuPaul shares the assignment of the main challenge and the fashion show ("dress to impress"), then the fashion show commences. After the contestants present their looks, the judges deliver their critiques, deliberate, then share the results with the group. Chad Michaels is declared the winner of the main challenge, earning her a custom gown as a prize. Kenya Michaels and Milan place in the bottom and face off in a lip-sync contest to "Vogue" (1990) by Madonna. Milan wins the lip-sync and Kenya Michaels is eliminated from the competition. Kenya Michaels returns to the workroom to leave a message on the mirror for the remaining contestants.

== Production and broadcast ==
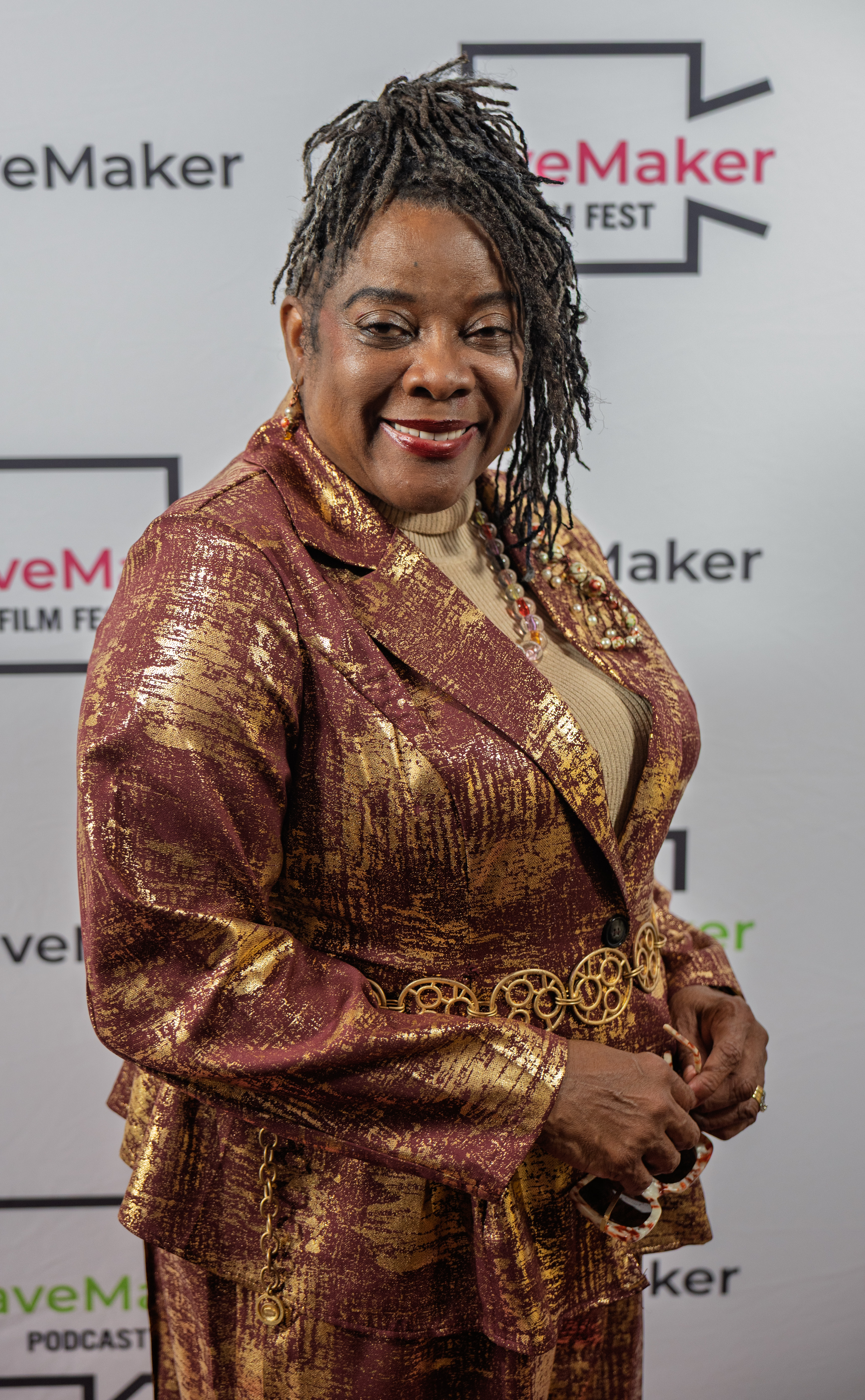
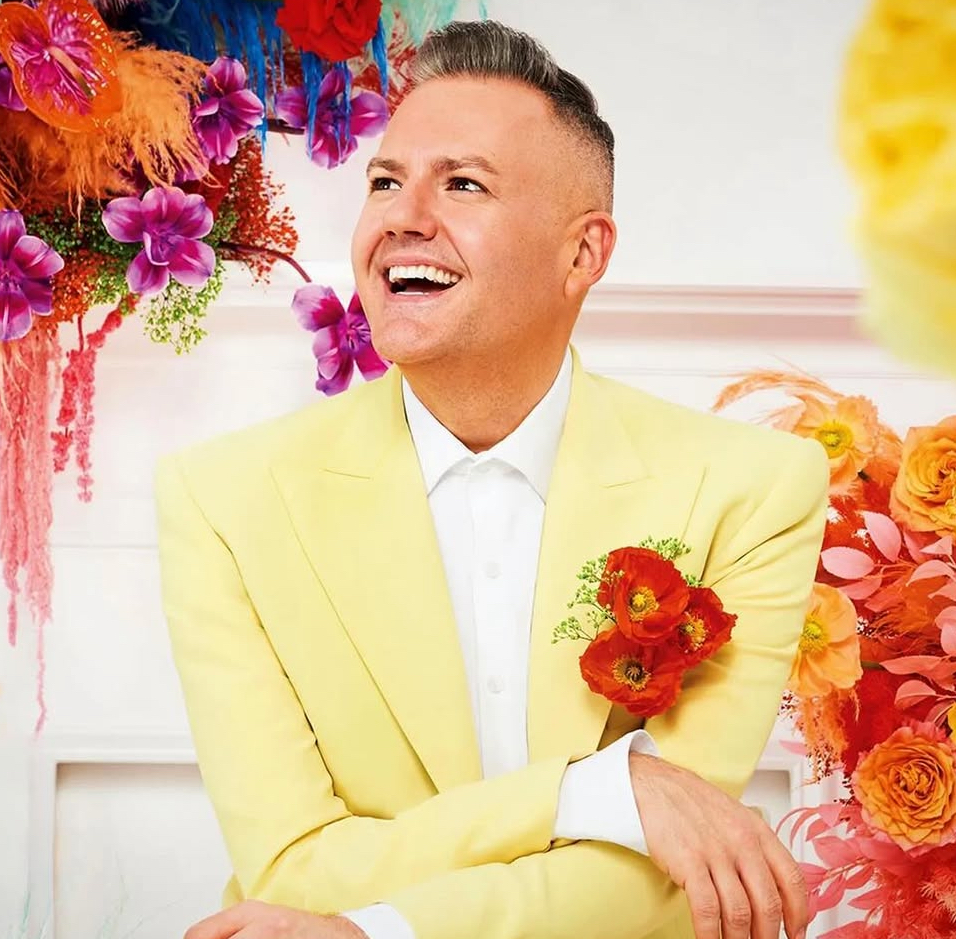
Loretta Devine (left, pictured in 2026) are Ross Mathews (right) are celebrity guests during the Snatch Game as well as guest judges.

The episode originally aired on February 27, 2012.

Shawn Morales of the Pit Crew participates in the mini-challenge.

=== Fashion ===
In the workroom, RuPaul wears a purple suit and a white dress shirt. For the main stage, RuPaul has a black-and-blue dress with a matching headpiece and a blonde wig.

For the fashion show, Jiggly Caliente wears a light blue gown and a long dark wig. Chad Michaels has an outfit with an animal print, a matching headscarf, and a yellow wig. Milan's Janelle Monáe-inspired outfit resembles a tuxedo. Milan also wears saddle shoes. Willam has a black lace outfit with tall boots, shoulder pads with chains, and a black hat. Phi Phi O'Hara wears a black-and-gold outfit and a brown wig. DiDa Ritz's skirt is made from stuffed toys and she has a dark wig. Inspired by the flag of Puerto Rico, Kenya Michaels's outfit is blue, red, and white. Sharon Needles has a plastic surgery-inspired look with black-and-white-striped leggings and black boots. She carries a needle. Latrice Royale wears a blue dress and a dark wig.

== Reception ==
Oliver Sava of The A.V. Club gave the episode a rating of 'A-'. Kevin O'Keeffe ranked the "Vogue" performance number 58 in INTO Magazine's 2018 "definitive ranking" of the show's lip-sync contests to date. Sam Brooks ranked the performance number 73 in The Spinoff's 2019 "definitive ranking" of the show's 162 lip-syncs to date.
