= Dragazines =

- RuPaul's Drag Race episode
- Episode no.: Season 4 Episode 7
- Directed by: Nick Murray
- Presented by: RuPaul
- Original air date: March 12, 2012

Guest judges
- Regina King; Pam Tillis

Episode chronology
| ← Previous "Float Your Boat" | Next → "Frenemies" |
- RuPaul's Drag Race season 4

"Dragazines" is the seventh episode of the fourth season of the American television series RuPaul's Drag Race. It originally aired on March 12, 2012. The episode's main challenge tasks the contestants with creating a magazine cover about a specific topic. Regina King and Pam Tillis are guest judges. Phi Phi O'Hara wins the episode's main challenge. Jiggly Caliente is eliminated from the competition after placing in the bottom and losing a lip-sync contest against Willam to Tillis's song "Mi Vida Loca".

== Episode ==
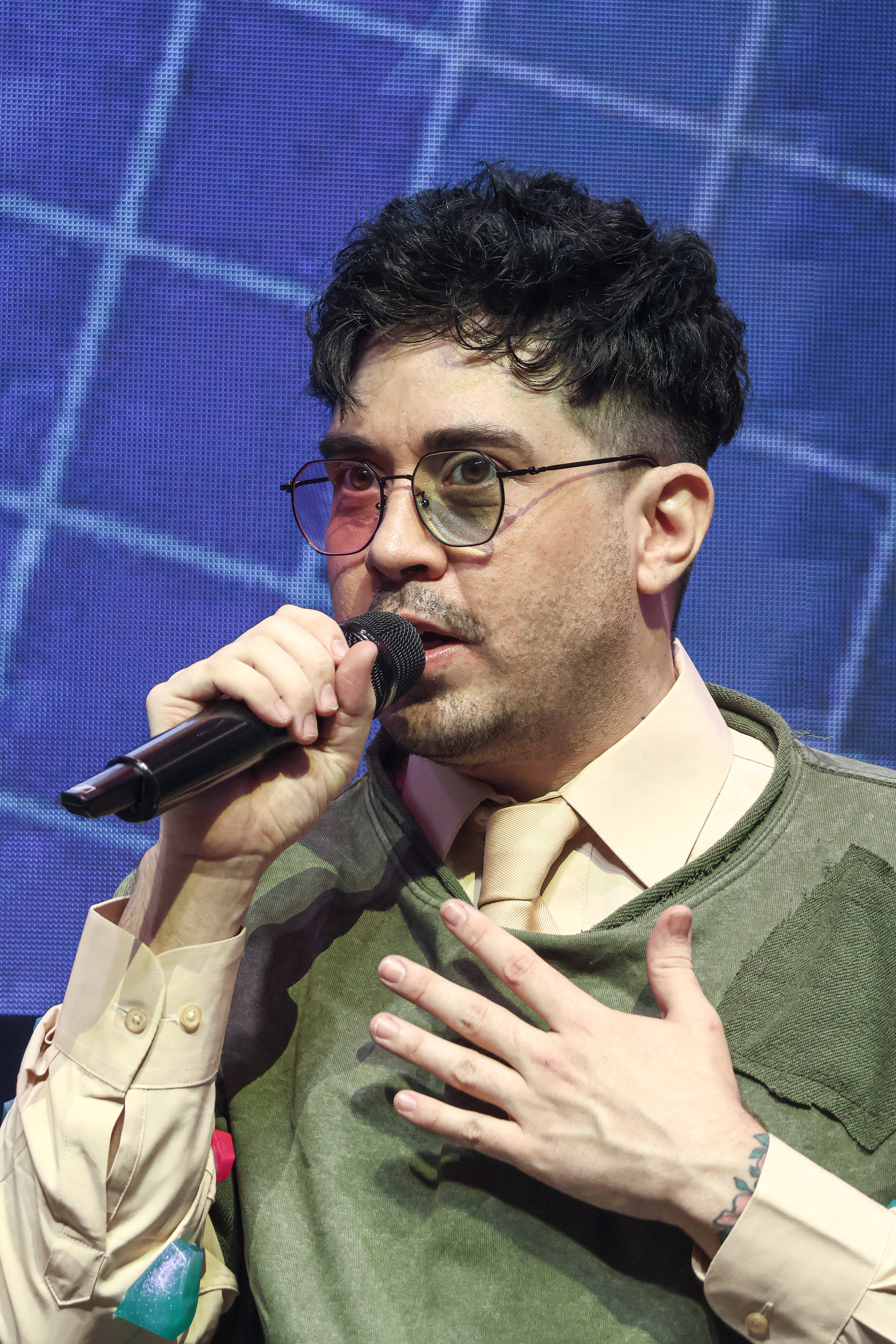
Phi Phi O'Hara (pictured in 2026) wins the episode's main challenge.

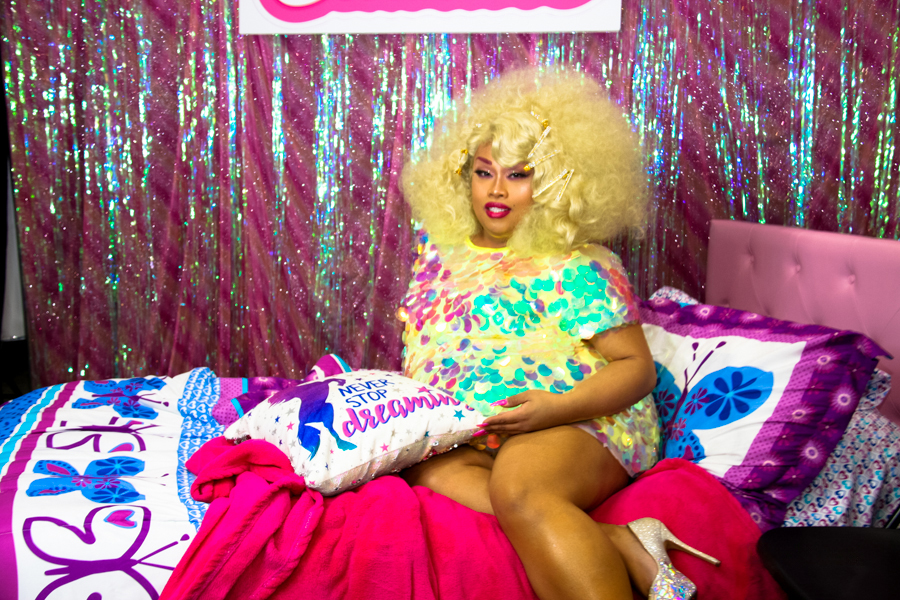
Jiggly Caliente (pictured at RuPaul's DragCon LA in 2018) is eliminated from the competition.

The seven remaining contestants return to the workroom and read Milan's mirror message. RuPaul greets the group and reveals the mini-challenge, which tasks the contestants with "reading" (or playfully insulting) each other. Latrice Royale is declared the winner of the mini-challenge.

RuPaul then reveals the main challenge, which tasks the contestants with creating a magazine cover about a certain topic. As the winner of the mini-challenge, Latrice Royale gets to assign the "dragazines". Following are the contestants and topics:

- Chad Michaels – Eleganza (fashion)
- DiDa Ritz – Tastes like Chicken (food)
- Jiggly Caliente – Battle of the Bulge (health and fitness)
- Latrice Royale – What's the T? (celebrity gossip)
- Phi Phi O'Hara – Sashay Away (travel)
- Sharon Needles – Kitty Cats (cat lovers)
- Willam – Sugar Walls (home decor)

The contestants start to develop their concepts. RuPaul returns to the workroom to meet with each contestant, asking questions and offering advice. Before leaving, RuPaul reveals that Regina King and Pam Tillis are guest judges. The contestants participate in a photo shoot for their magazine covers with a guest photographer and members of the Pit Crew. On elimination day, the contestants make final preparations for the fashion show.

On the main stage, RuPaul welcomes fellow judges Michelle Visage and Santino Rice, as well as guest judges King and Tillis. RuPaul shares the assignment of the main challenge, then the fashion show commences. After the contestants present their looks, the judges and contestants review the magazine covers. The judges deliver their critiques, deliberate, and share the results with the group. Phi Phi O'Hara is declared the winner of the challenge. Jiggly Caliente and Willam place in the bottom and face off in a lip-sync to "Mi Vida Loca" by Tillis. Willam wins the lip-sync and Jiggly Caliente is eliminated from the competition. Jiggly Caliente returns to the workroom to leave a message on the mirror for the remaining contestants.

== Production and broadcast ==
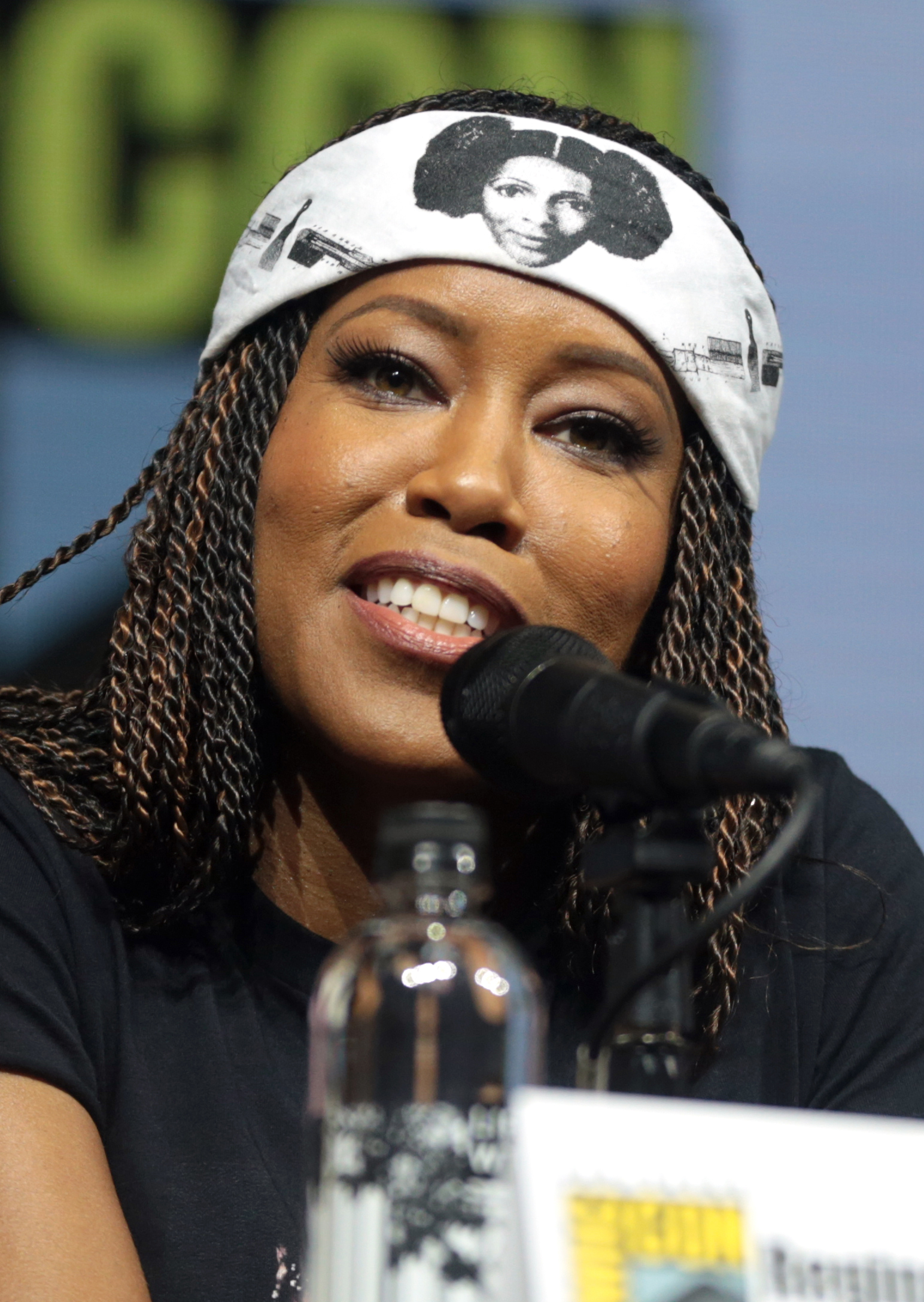
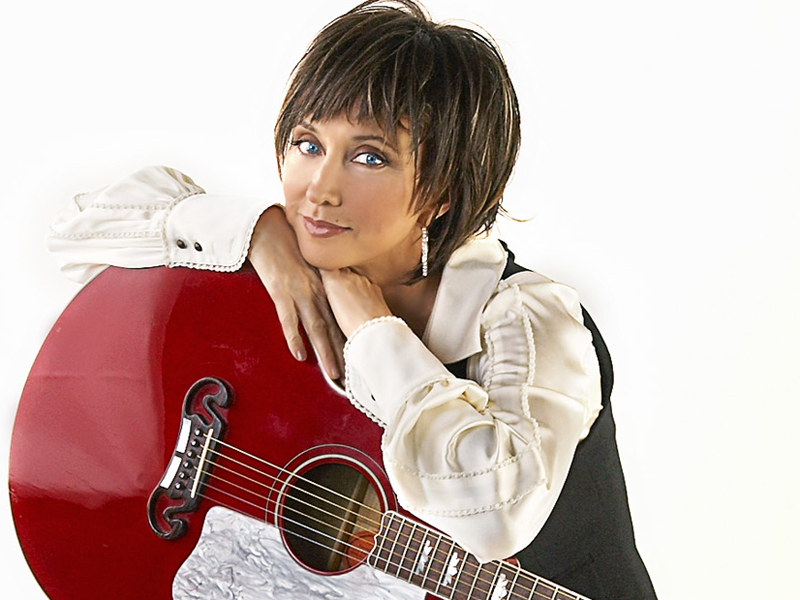
Regina King (left) and Pam Tillis (right) are guest judges.

The episode was directed by Nick Murray and originally aired on March 12, 2012. Shawn Morales is among members of the Pit Crew. On the main stage, RuPaul says to Phi Phi O'Hara, "Your travel dragazine was a real trip, and we’re excited that you keep taking us to new places."

=== Fashion ===
In the workroom, RuPaul wears a blue suit and a red dress shirt with white polka dots. On the main stage RuPaul wears a black-and-blue dress with a large blonde wig. For the fashion show, Sharon Needles has a black-and-white dress with black gloves and a dark wig. DiDa Ritz wears a silver dress with a long dark wig. Chad Michaels has a black outfit with a short blonde wig. Latrice Royale wears many jewels and has a dark wig. Willam has a short pink dress and a blonde wig. Jiggly Caliente wears a yellow dress and a blonde wig. Phi Phi O'Hara has a short turquoise dress and a dark wig.

== Reception ==
Genevieve Koski gave the episode a rating of 'A-'. Kevin O'Keeffe ranked the "Mi Vida Loca" performance number 118 in INTO Magazine's 2018 "definitive ranking" of the show's lip-sync contests to date. Sam Brooks also ranked the performance number 118 in The Spinoff's 2019 "definitive ranking" of the show's 162 lip-syncs to date.
