= Frenemies (RuPaul's Drag Race) =

- RuPaul's Drag Race episode
- Episode no.: Season 4 Episode 8
- Presented by: RuPaul
- Original air date: March 19, 2012

Guest judges
- Pamela Anderson; Lucian Piane; Jennifer Tilly

Episode chronology
← Previous "Dragazines"	Next → "Frock the Vote!"
- RuPaul's Drag Race season 4

"Frenemies" is the eighth episode of the fourth season of the American television series RuPaul's Drag Race. It originally aired on March 19, 2012. The episode's main challenge tasks the contestants with performing a duet live, with original choreography. Pamela Anderson, Lucian Piane, and Jennifer Tilly are guest judges. Latrice Royale and Willam are declared the winners of the main challenge. However, Willam is disqualified from the competition after breaking the rules.

== Episode ==
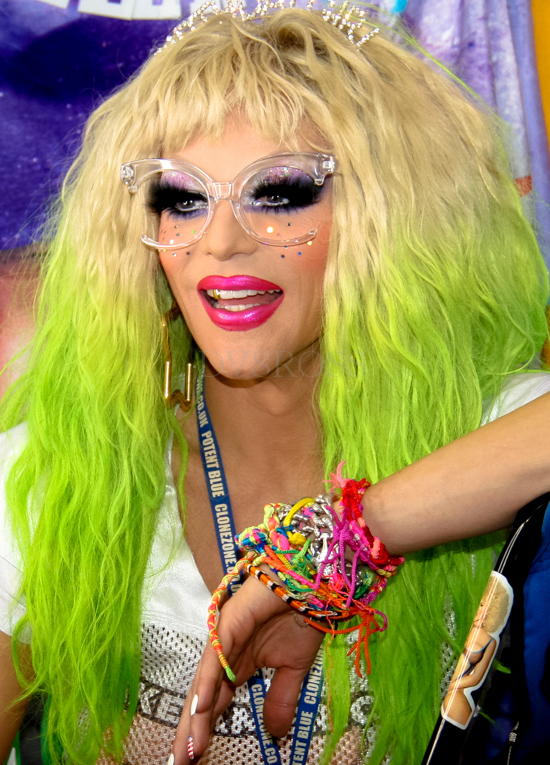
Willam (pictured in 2019) is eliminated from the competition.

The contestants return to the workroom. RuPaul greets the group and reveals the mini-challenge, which tasks the contestants with completing a polygraph test. Based on these results and personality types, the contestants are then paired up for the main challenge and tasked with singing a duet to "Better Than You", live and with original choreography. Following are the teams of "frenemies", who RuPaul notes have different personality types:

- Chad Michaels and DiDa Ritz
- Latrice Royale and Willam
- Phi Phi O'Hara and Sharon Needles

The contestants start to prepare for the main challenge. RuPaul returns to the workroom to meet with each pair, asking questions and offering advice. Before leaving, RuPaul reveals that the contestants will be rehearsing with "Better Than You" writer Lucian Piane, that Pamela Anderson and Jennifer Tilly are guest judges, and that the pairs are being judged together. The teams then rehearse with Piane on the main stage. On elimination day, the contestants make final preparations in the workroom for the fashion show. The contestants talk about their "drag families" and support systems.

On the main stage, RuPaul welcomes fellow judge Michelle Visage as well as guest judges Anderson, Piane, and Tilly. RuPaul shares the assignment of the main challenge, then the performances commence. The judges deliver their critiques, deliberate, then share the results with the contestants. Latrice Royale and Willam are declared the winners of the main challenge, earning both custom corsets. Willam vomits on the side of the stage. Phi Phi O'Hara and Sharon Needles place in the bottom and face off in a lip-sync contest to "It's Raining Men (The Sequel)" by Martha Wash and RuPaul. After the lip-sync, RuPaul announces that Willam has broken the rules and will be disqualified from the competition immediately. Because of this disqualification, Phi Phi O'Hara and Sharon Needles are both deemed winners of the lip-sync and no one is eliminated from the competition.

== Production and broadcast ==
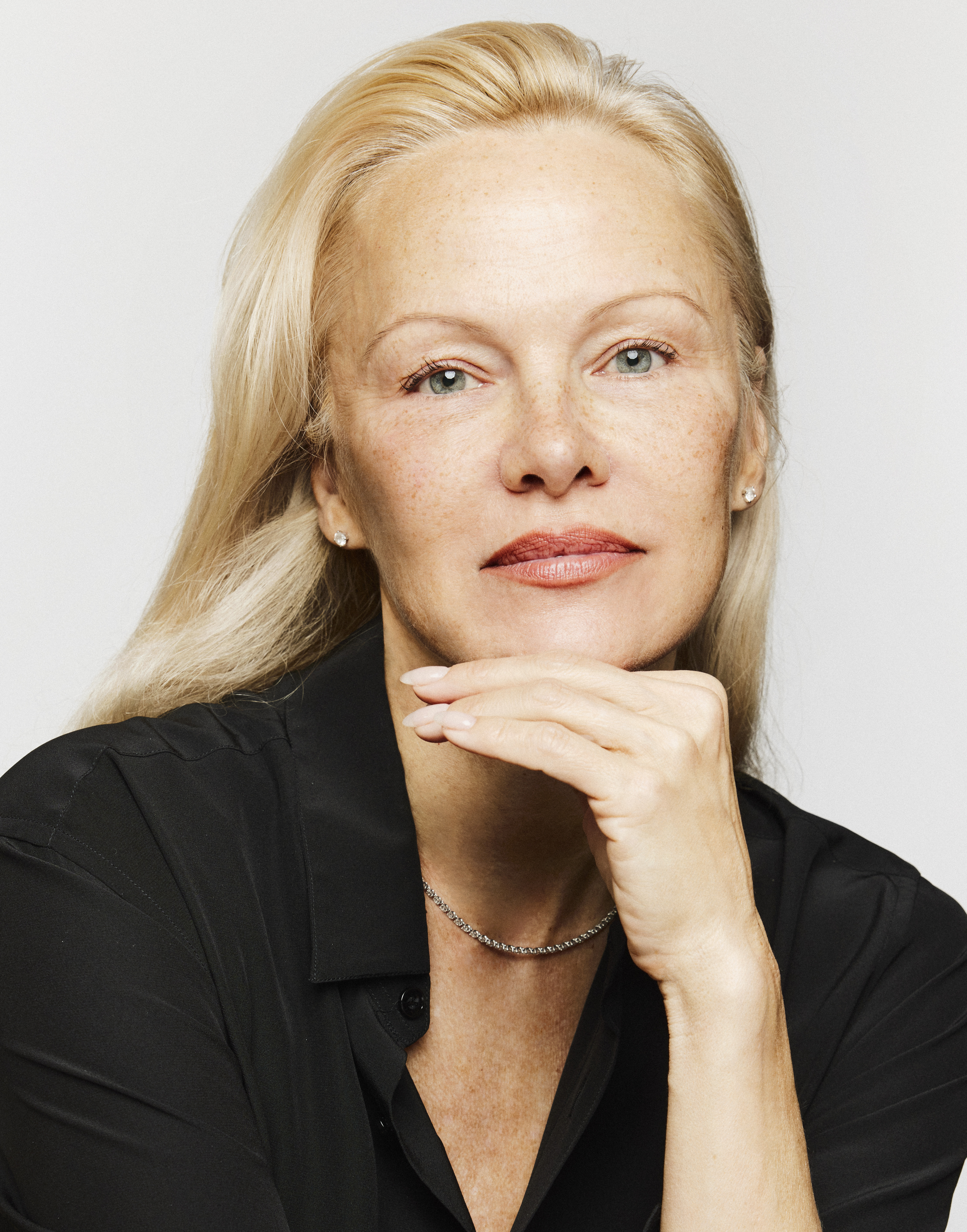
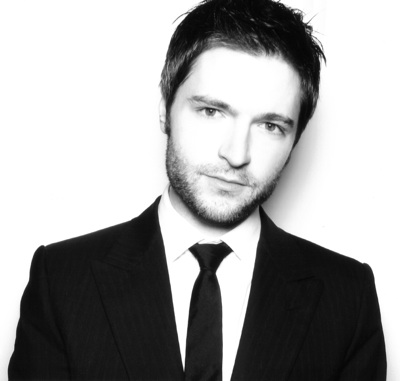
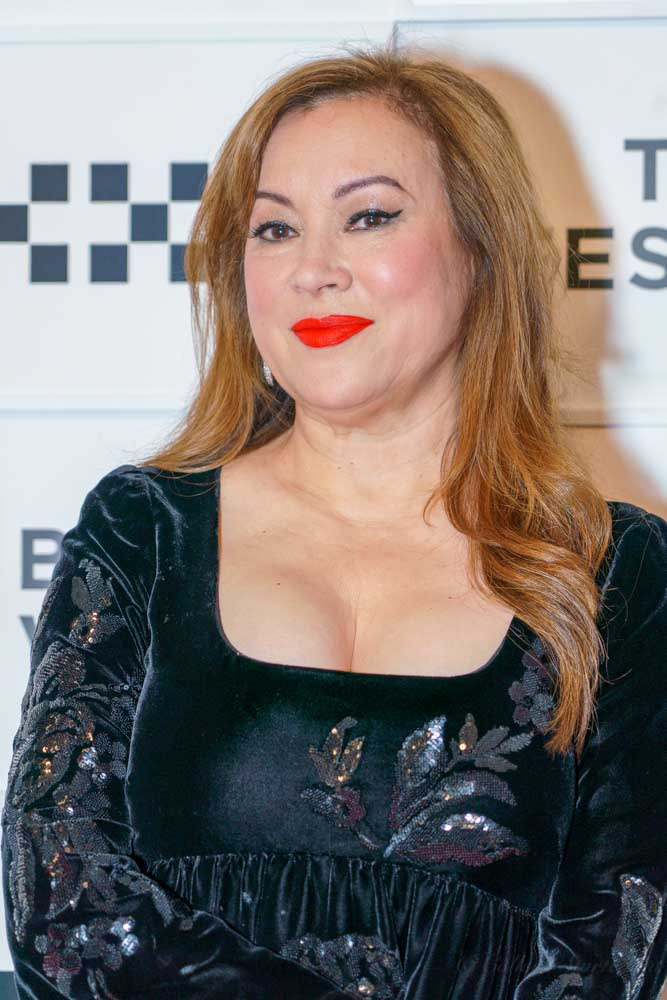
Pamela Anderson (left), Lucian Piane (center), and Jennifer Tilly (right) are guest judges.

The episode originally aired on March 19, 2012.

Willam is the first contestants to be disqualified from Drag Race. Various reasons were given for her disqualification. On the season finale, Willam claimed that she received conjugal visits from her husband during filming, which is not allowed. Willam later offered other reasons. In 2020, Bernardo Sim of Screen Rant said the show" had a sense of humor about Willam's disqualification". The website's Benjamin Hickson called the disqualification "iconic".

=== Fashion ===
In the workroom, RuPaul wears a white suit with a pink dress shirt. On the main stage, RuPaul wears a green dress and a large blonde wig. Visage wears a black outfit. gloves with an animal print, and earrings resembling lightning.

For the singing act, Latrice Royale and Willam wear short pink dresses and have black-and-pink umbrellas. The former has red hair and the latter has a blonde wig. Both contestants remove parts of their outfit to reveal black bodysuits. Phi Phi O'Hara and Sharon Needles resemble an angel and a devil, respectively. The former has a silver-and-white bodysuit, silver gloves, a halo, and a blonde wig. The latter has a red outfit with sequins, matching gloves, a dark wig, and devil horns. Chad Michaels has a blue dress with purple toile. DiDa Ritz has a short yellow dress, matching high-heeled shoes, and a dark wig.

== Reception ==
Oliver Sava of The A.V. Club gave the episode a rating of 'A'. Kevin O’Keeffe ranked "Frenemies" sixth in Xtra Magazine's 2020 list of the show's ten best episodes to date, writing: "This was the first moment the show broke out in broader pop culture, taking the series to the next level. Upon rewatch, the shock may have softened, but it's no less of a gag."
