= Frock the Vote! =

- RuPaul's Drag Race episode
- Episode no.: Season 4 Episode 9
- Directed by: Nick Murray
- Presented by: RuPaul
- Original air date: March 26, 2012

Guest judges
- Dan Savage; Jeffrey Moran

Episode chronology
← Previous "Frenemies"	Next → "DILFs: Dads I'd Like to Frock"
- RuPaul's Drag Race season 4

"Frock the Vote!" is the ninth episode of the fourth season of the American television series RuPaul's Drag Race. It originally aired on March 26, 2012. The episode's main challenge tasks contestants with participating in a presidential debate. Dan Savage and Jeffrey Moran of Absolut Vodka are guest judges. Sharon Needles wins the main challenge. DiDa Ritz is eliminated from the competition after placing in the bottom and losing a lip-sync contest against Latrice Royale to "I've Got to Use My Imagination" by Gladys Knight & the Pips.

== Episode ==
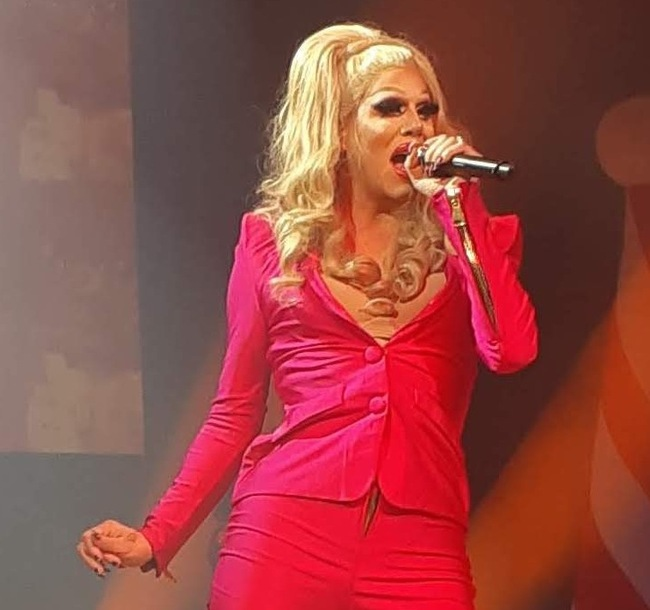
Sharon Needles (pictured in 2018) wins the episode's main challenge.

The contestants return to the Werk Room after Willam's removal from the competition on the previous episode. RuPaul greets the group and reveals the mini-challenge, which tasks the contestants with designing platform shoes. RuPaul invites Jeffrey Moran of Absolut Vodka to help explain the assignment and share different drinks to serve as design inspiration. The contestants create and present their shoe concepts RuPaul declares Phi Phi O'Hara the winner of the mini-challenge. RuPaul then reveals the main challenge, which tasks the contestants with participating in a presidential debate as Wig Party candidates.

The contestants start to create their characters, opening and closing statements, and slogans. RuPaul and Dan Savage visit the Werk Room, meeting with contestants individually to ask questions and offer advice. RuPaul moderates the debate, with help from Michelle Visage and Savage. The contestants deliver opening statements, answer questions, then deliver closing statements. Back in the Werk Room, the contestants make final preparations for the fashion show. The group discuss politics and whether or not they prefer to mix drag and politics.

On the main stage, RuPaul welcomes fellow judges Visage and Santino Rice, as well as guest judges Moran and Savage. The runway category is "Inaugural Drag". The fashion show commences. The judges deliver their critiques, deliberate, then share the results with the group. Chad Michaels and Sharon Needles receive positive critiques, and Sharon Needles wins the challenge. DiDa Ritz, Latrice Royale, and Phi Phi O'Hara receive negative critiques, and Phi Phi O'Hara is deemed safe. DiDa Ritz and Latrice Royale face off in a lip-sync contest to "I've Got to Use My Imagination" (1973) by Gladys Knight & the Pips. Latrice Royale wins the lip-sync and DiDa Ritz is eliminated from the competition. RuPaul tells the remaining contestants that the judges will be voting one of the eliminated competitors back into the competition.

== Production and broadcast ==
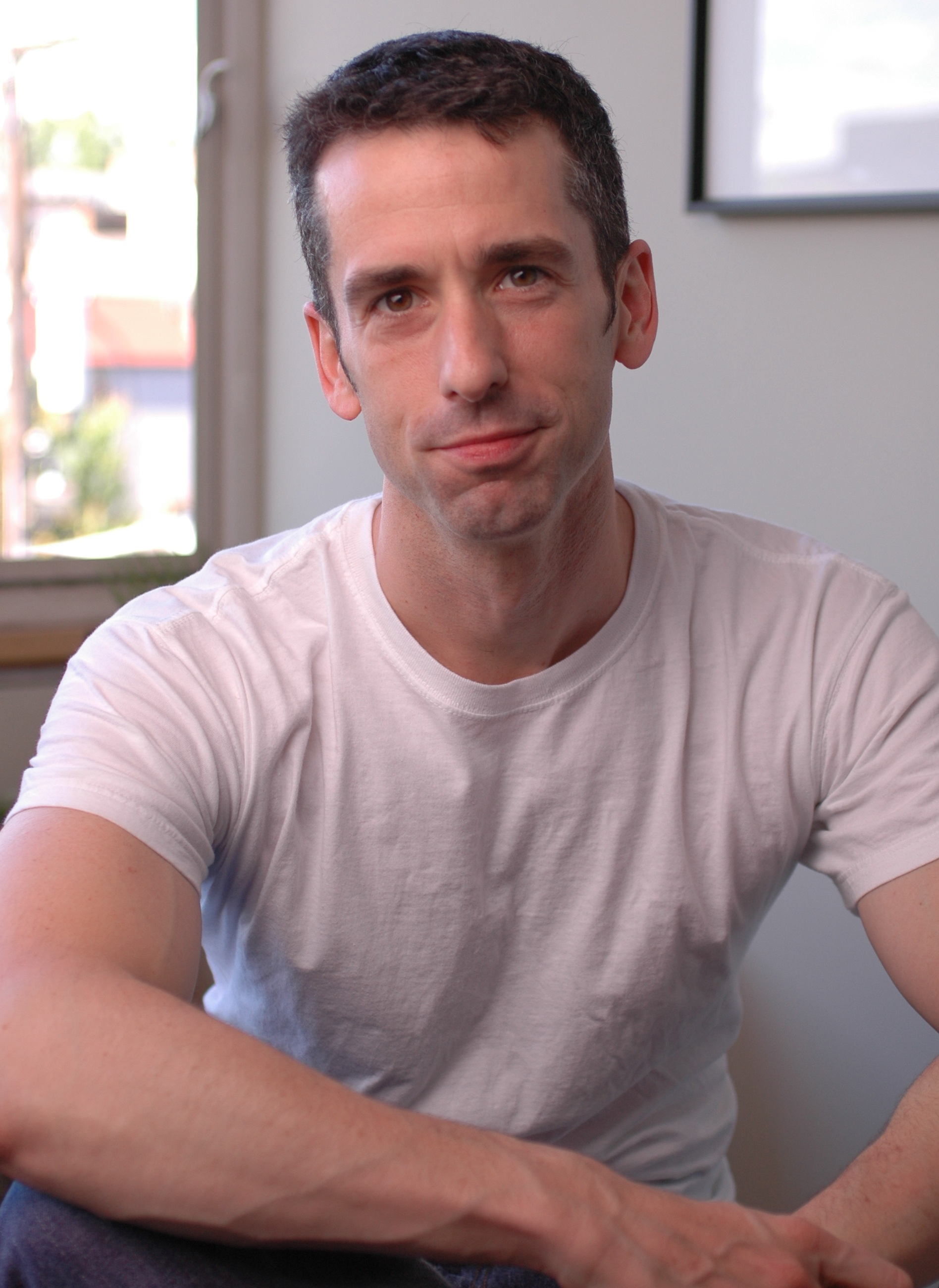
Dan Savage (pictured) is a guest judge.

The episode originally aired on March 26, 2012. It was directed by Nick Murray.

Sharon Needles impersonated politician Michele Bachmann on the episode. She also told Savage that she was bullied in her youth. Winning the challenge was a Drag Race highlight for her. HuffPost suggested Phi Phi O'Hara made an offensive remark on the episode, but DiDa Ritz said she was not offended.

Billboard said Latrice Royale delivers "a legendary read" about Phi Phi O'Hara to Savage. Kevin O'Keeffe of Xtra Magazine wrote, "perhaps the single most memorable moment from [the episode] came from Latrice Royale, who got an incredible joke in at Phi Phi O'Hara's expense... In the moment, it made fellow competitor Chad Michaels, as well as RuPaul and guest judge Dan Savage, break character to laugh, and it highlighted that Phi Phi's choice to portray a racist caricature wasn't paying off."

=== Fashion ===
For the debate, Chad Michaels "opts for an untraditional route, creating a pimp-inspired character with a double pink afro wig tied into a brown bob," according to The Standard. For the fashion show, Phi Phi O'Hara wears a white dress. DiDa Ritz's dress is black. Chad Michaels wears a green and white dress, with a blonde wig. Latrice Royale has a black dress with a corset. Sharon Needles has a tan dress made of pantyhose, a black corset, and a blonde wig.

== Reception ==
The A.V. Club gave the episode a rating of 'A-'. In Consequence's 2018 "essential guide to finally starting" RuPaul's Drag Race, Allison Shoemaker called the episode "a highlight of one of the show's best seasons". In 2022, Min Ji Park included Savage in Screen Rant's overview of the show's worst judges, based on Reddit, writing: "Although Dan Savage is a gay icon, his appearance on a politically themed episode of Drag Race was met with a rather lukewarm response... Although the queens are meant to pretend to run for office in the challenge, the fact that the show is a drag queen reality show is meant to be acknowledged. Savage simply took the maxi challenge too seriously for what the environment of Drag Race called for." In 2023, Kevin O'Keeffe of Xtra Magazine said the episode's main challenge "notoriously featured a wide range of performances, thanks to the vague and inconsistent criteria laid out for it." E. Alex Jung gave "honorable mention" to the "I've Got to Use My Imagination" performance in Vulture's 2014 list of the show's ten best lip-syncs. Jared Richards ranked the performance number 12 in Junkee's 2018 list of the show's 40 "most iconic" lip-syncs. Kevin O'Keeffe ranked the performance number 25 in INTO Magazine's 2018 "definitive ranking" of the show's lip-syncs to date. Sam Brooks ranked the performance number 35 in The Spinoff's 2019 "definitive ranking" of the show's 162 lip-syncs to date.
