= Float Your Boat (RuPaul's Drag Race) =

- RuPaul's Drag Race episode
- Episode no.: Season 4 Episode 6
- Presented by: RuPaul
- Original air date: March 5, 2012

Guest judges
- Billy B; Kelly Osbourne; Pauley Perrette

Episode chronology
← Previous "Snatch Game"	Next → "Dragazines"
- RuPaul's Drag Race season 4

"Float Your Boat" is the sixth episode of the fourth season of the American television series RuPaul's Drag Race. It originally aired on March 5, 2012. The episode's main challenge tasks the contestants with creating and wearing a pride float based on a color of the pride flag. Billy B, Kelly Osbourne, and Pauley Perrette are guest judges.

Willam wins the episode's main challenge. Milan is eliminated from the competition after placing in the bottom and losing a lip-sync contest against Jiggly Caliente to "Born This Way" by Lady Gaga.

== Episode ==
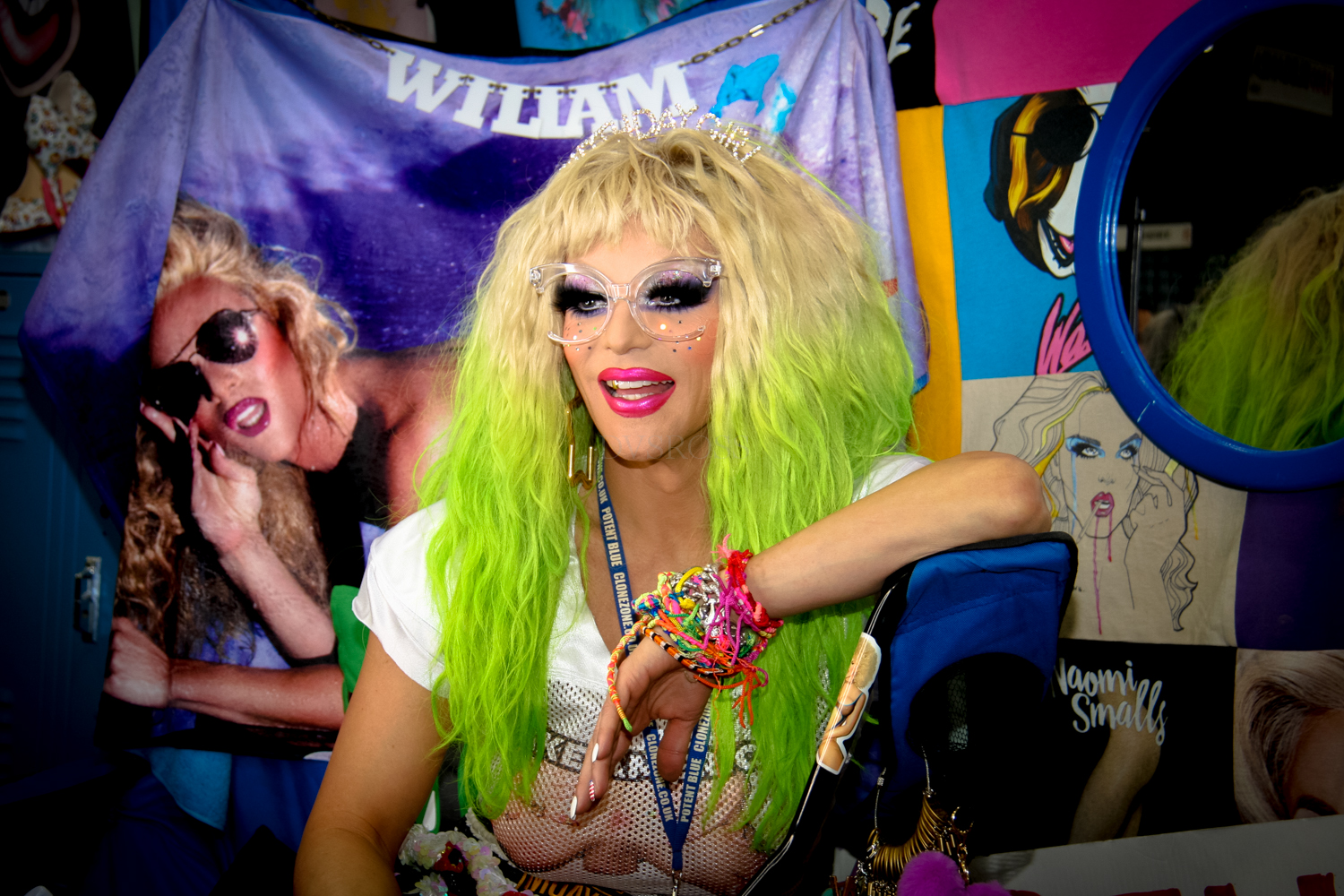
Willam (pictured at RuPaul's DragCon LA in 2019) wins the episode's main challenge.

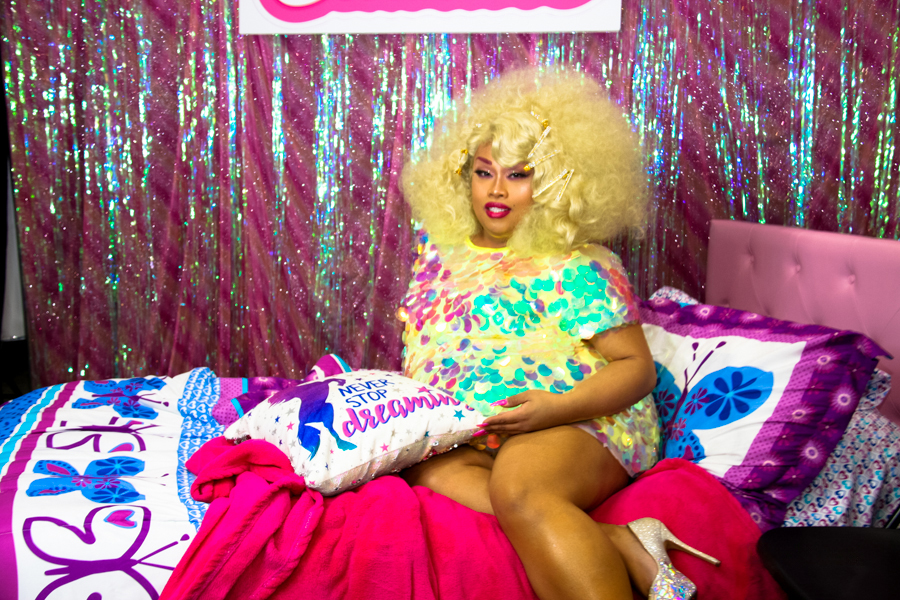
Jiggly Caliente (pictured at RuPaul's DragCon LA in 2018) wins the episode's lip-sync contest.

The contestants return to the workroom and read Kenya Michaels's mirror message. RuPaul greets the group and reveals the mini-challenge, which tasks the contestants with generating the biggest crowd reaction in a wet T-shirt contest. The contestants put on breastplates, then the contest commences outside. Willam is declared the winner of the mini-challenge.

Back in the workroom, RuPaul reveals the main challenge, which tasks the contestants with creating and wearing a pride float based on a color of the pride flag to match their outfit. As the winner of the mini-challenge, Willam gets to assign the color themes. Willam distributes the handkerchiefs of various colors at random. Following are the contestants and assigned colors:

- Chad Michaels – pink
- DiDa Ritz – red
- Jiggly Caliente – orange
- Latrice Royale – turquoise
- Milan – yellow
- Phi Phi O'Hara – violet
- Sharon Needles – green
- Willam – indigo

The contestants start to develop their concepts. The group talk about the Stonewall riots. RuPaul returns to meet with each contestant, asking questions and offering advice. Before leaving, RuPaul reveals that Kelly Osbourne and Pauley Perrette are guest judges. While preparing for the fashion show, the contestants talk about working at pride celebrations.

On elimination day, the contestants make final preparations. On the main stage, RuPaul welcomes fellow judge Michelle Visage and guest judges Billy B, Osbourne, and Perrette. RuPaul shares the assignment of the main challenge, then the fashion show commences. After the contestants present their looks, the judges deliver their critiques, deliberate, then share the results with the group. Willam is declared the winner of the main challenge. Jiggly Caliente and Milan place in the bottom and face off in a lip-sync contest to "Born This Way" (2011) by Lady Gaga. Jiggly Caliente wins the lip-sync and Milan is eliminated from the competition. Milan returns to the workroom to leave a message on the mirror for the remaining contestants.

== Production and broadcast ==
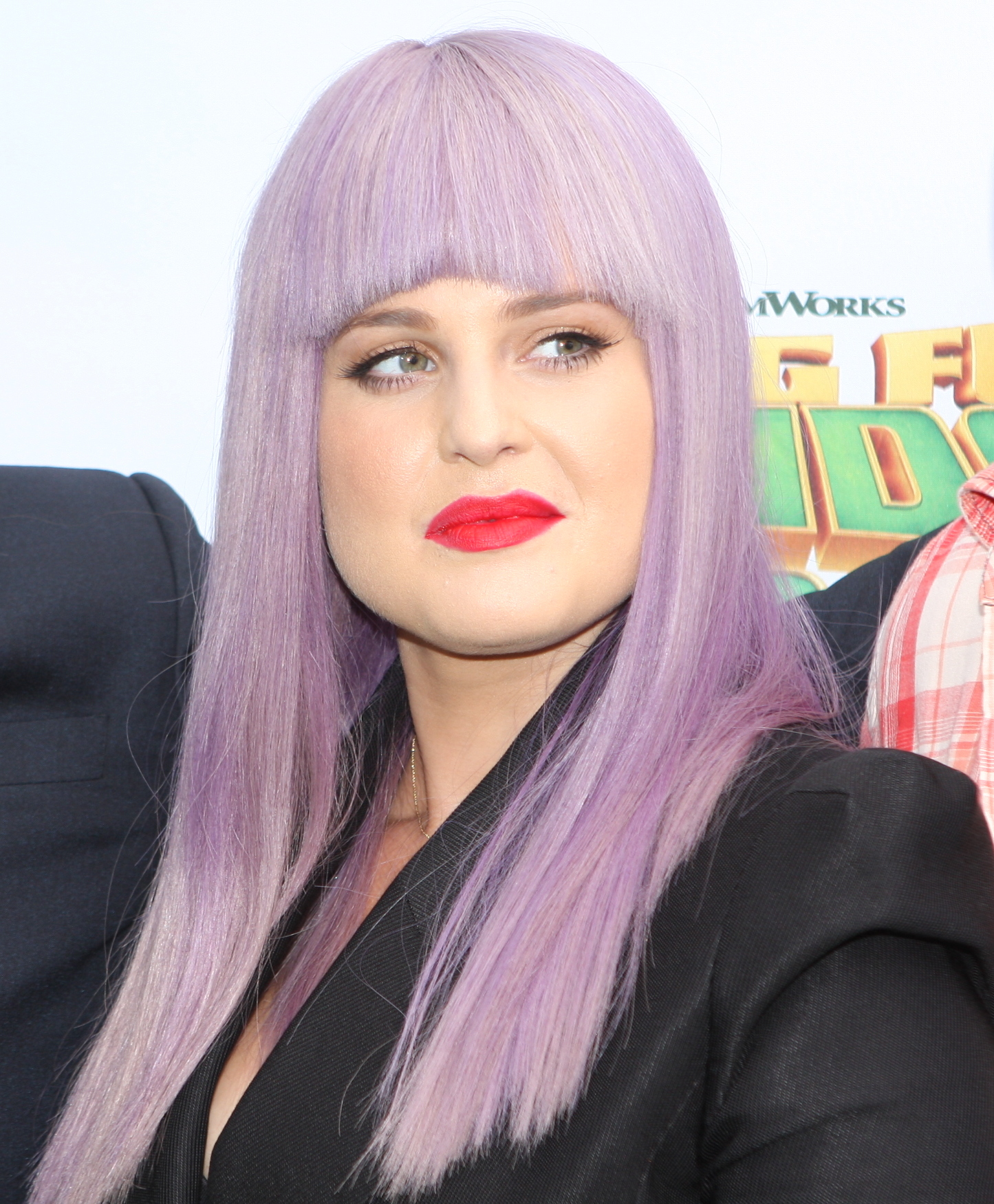
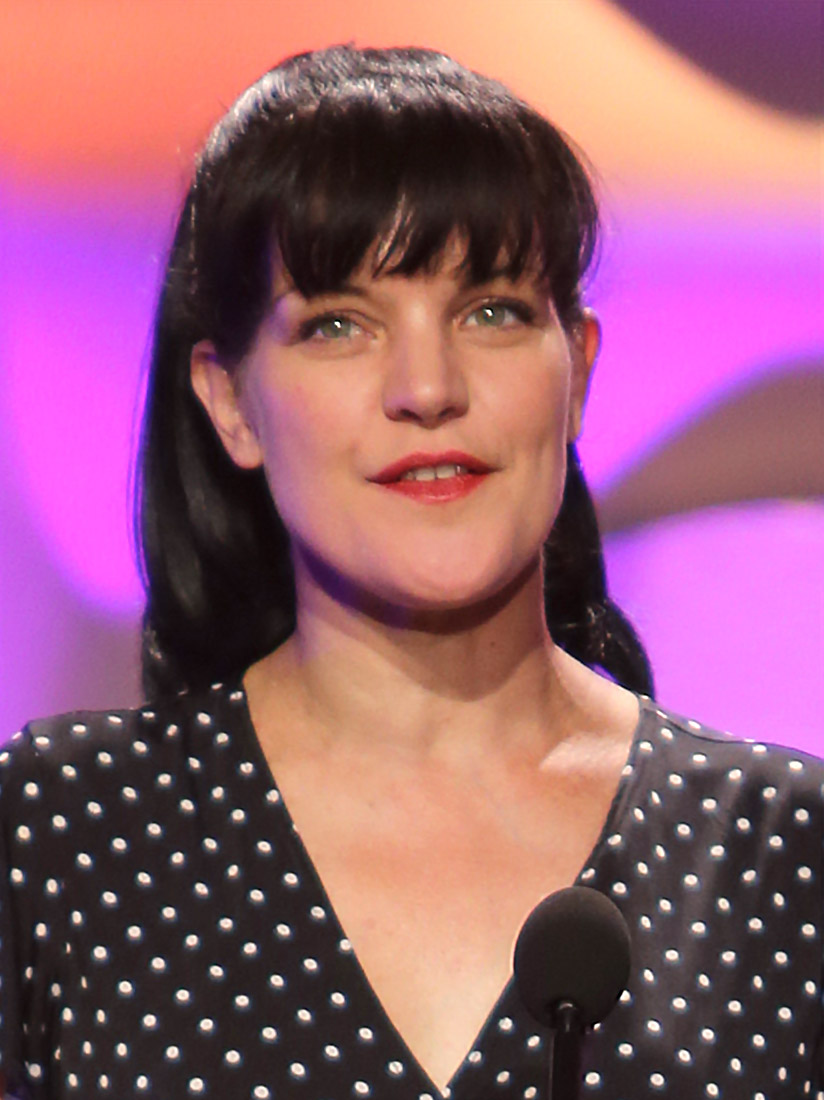
Kelly Osbourne (left) and Pauley Perrette (right) are guest judges.

The episode originally aired on March 5, 2012.

Shawn Morales is among members of the Pit Crew. While RuPaul is meeting with the contestants individually, Willam quotes RuPaul's book.

=== Fashion ===
For the fashion show, Chad Michaels has a showgirl-inspired outfit with matching gloves. DiDa Ritz wears harem pants and a dark wig. Jiggly Caliente has a cape, large hoop earrings, and a long dark ponytail. Milan wears black high-heeled shoes and a large afro. Sharon Needles has a snake-inspired outfit and a red wig. Latrice Royale has tall black boots and blue in her wig. Willam removes a coat to reveal a short denim bodysuit. She has a large blonde wig. Phi Phi O'Hara wears a science fiction-inspired outfit with gloves and a long wig.

== Reception ==
Oliver Sava of The A.V. Club gave the episode a rating of 'A'. Kevin O'Keeffe ranked the "Born This Way" performance number 90 in INTO Magazine's 2018 "definitive ranking" of the show's lip-sync contests to date. Sam Brooks ranked the performance number 129 in The Spinoff's "definitive ranking" of the show's 162 lip-syncs to date. Michelle Konopka Alonzo considered Milan's performance one of the show's worst lip-sync, writing: "The first hint of Milan's desperation appeared when she jumped into a split right after Jiggly, and things quickly went downhill when Milan boldly removed her wig, dress, and jewelry. The intent behind the decision could have easily had to do with the message of 'Born This Way,' but RuPaul and Michelle Visage's immediate reactions told the audience that Milan would be sent packing."
