= RuPaul's Drag Race season 4 =

2012 season of RuPaul's Drag Race

RuPaul's Drag Race
- Season 4
- Promotional poster for season four
- Hosted by: RuPaul
- Judges: RuPaul; Michelle Visage; Santino Rice; Billy B
- No. of contestants: 13
- Winner: Sharon Needles
- Runners-up: Chad Michaels; Phi Phi O'Hara
- Miss Congeniality: Latrice Royale
- Companion show: RuPaul's Drag Race: Untucked!
- No. of episodes: 14

Release
- Original network: Logo TV
- Original release: January 30 – April 30, 2012

Season chronology
- ← Previous; Season 3 Next → Season 5

The fourth season of RuPaul's Drag Race began airing on January 30, 2012, and aired its final episode on April 30 of the same year. The cast members were announced November 13, 2011. The winner of season four headlined Logo's Drag Race Tour featuring Absolut Vodka, and also won a one-of-a-kind trip, a lifetime supply of NYX Cosmetics, and a cash prize of $100,000.

Like the previous season, Santino Rice and Billy B (Billy Brasfield), celebrity makeup artist and star of the HGTV mini-series Hometown Renovation, shared the same seat at the judges table alternatively, Brasfield filling in for Rice when needed. Both judges appeared side-by-side in the audience during the reunion episode.

The theme song played during the runway every episode was "Glamazon" and the song played during the credits was "The Beginning", both from RuPaul's album Glamazon.

This is the first season in which a contestant, Willam Belli, was disqualified from the competition for breaking the rules, and the second season in a row in which a contestant, Kenya Michaels, was brought back into the competition after having been eliminated in a prior episode.

The winner of the fourth season of RuPaul's Drag Race was Sharon Needles, with Chad Michaels and Phi Phi O'Hara being the runners-up, making it the first time in the show's history to have two runners-up. The final also featured the first three-way lip-sync battle, instead of the usual format with two competitors. It was the first season in which the winner was not crowned in the studio but instead during the reunion episode, which was filmed in front of a live audience. This was also the first time three versions of the finale were filmed with each Top 3 contestant being crowned to prevent spoilers; this came after Raja winning Season 3 was leaked by Perez Hilton in 2011.

Jiggly Caliente, who placed 8th in the competition and later served as a judge on Drag Race Philippines, died on April 27, 2025.

== Contestants ==
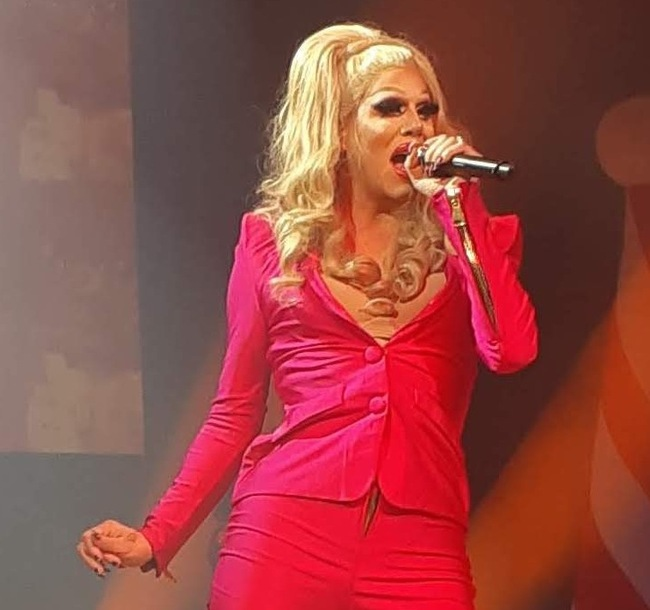
The winner, Sharon Needles

Ages, names, and cities stated are at time of filming.

Contestants of RuPaul's Drag Race season 4 and their backgrounds
Contestant	Age	Hometown	Outcome
Sharon Needles	29	Pittsburgh, Pennsylvania	Winner
Chad Michaels	40	San Diego, California	Runners-up
Phi Phi O'Hara (Note: Now professionally known as Jaremi Carey, Phi Phi O'Hara was originally known as Phoenix O'Hara but changed it upon being cast.)	25	Chicago, Illinois	Runners-up
Latrice Royale	39	South Beach, Florida	4th place (Note: Latrice Royale was voted Miss Congeniality by the viewers)
Kenya Michaels	21	San Juan, Puerto Rico	5th place (Note: Kenya Michaels originally placed ninth before re-entering the competition)
DiDa Ritz	25	Chicago, Illinois	6th place
Willam	29	Los Angeles, California	Disqualified (Note: It was revealed during episode 8 that Willam was disqualified from the competition for breaching the contract agreement)
Jiggly Caliente	30	New York City, New York	8th place
Milan	36	New York City, New York	9th place
Madame LaQueer	29	Carolina, Puerto Rico	10th place
The Princess	31	Chicago, Illinois	11th place
Lashauwn Beyond	21	Fort Lauderdale, Florida	12th place
Alisa Summers	23	Tampa, Florida	13th place

== Contestant progress ==
Legend:

Sharon Needles won RuPaul's Drag Race season 4.
Chad Michaels and Phi-Phi O'Hara were the runners-up.
Latrice Royale was voted Miss Congeniality (Miss C) by the viewers.
WIN indicates the contestant won the challenge.
SAFE indicates that the contestant was declared safe by the judges.
IMM (Immunity) indicates that the contestant was immune for the episode.
BTM (Bottom) indicates that the contestant was up for elimination.
ELIM (Eliminated) indicates that contestant was eliminated.
DISQ (Disqualified) indicates that Willam was disqualified for breaking the rules after winning the challenge alongside Latrice Royale.
Guest indicates that the contestant returned as a guest.

Contestants progress with placements in each episode
Contestant	Episode												
Contestant	1	2	3	4	5	6	7	8	9	10	11	13	14
Sharon Needles	WIN	IMM	WIN	IMM	SAFE	SAFE	SAFE	BTM	WIN	SAFE	WIN	SAFE	Winner
Chad Michaels	SAFE	WIN	SAFE	SAFE	WIN	IMM	SAFE	SAFE	SAFE	SAFE	BTM	SAFE	Runner-up
Phi Phi O'Hara	SAFE	SAFE	SAFE	SAFE	SAFE	SAFE	WIN	BTM	SAFE	WIN	SAFE	SAFE	Runner-up
Latrice Royale	SAFE	SAFE	SAFE	WIN	IMM	SAFE	SAFE	WIN	BTM	BTM	ELIM		Miss C
Kenya Michaels	SAFE	SAFE	SAFE	SAFE	ELIM					ELIM			Guest
DiDa Ritz	SAFE	SAFE	BTM	SAFE	SAFE	SAFE	SAFE	SAFE	ELIM				Guest
Willam	SAFE	SAFE	SAFE	SAFE	SAFE	WIN	BTM	DISQ					Guest
Jiggly Caliente	BTM	SAFE	SAFE	SAFE	SAFE	BTM	ELIM						Guest
Milan	SAFE	SAFE	SAFE	BTM	BTM	ELIM							Guest
Madame LaQueer	SAFE	WIN	SAFE	ELIM									Guest
The Princess	SAFE	BTM	ELIM										Guest
Lashauwn Beyond	SAFE	ELIM											Guest
Alisa Summers	ELIM												Guest

== Lip syncs ==
Legend:

The contestant was eliminated after their first time in the bottom.
The contestant was eliminated after their second time in the bottom.
The contestant was eliminated after their third time in the bottom.

Episode	Contestants			Song	Eliminated
1	Alisa Summers	vs.	Jiggly Caliente	"Toxic" (Britney Spears)	Alisa Summers
2	Lashauwn Beyond	vs.	The Princess	"Bad Girls" (Donna Summer)	Lashauwn Beyond
3	DiDa Ritz	vs.	The Princess	"This Will Be (An Everlasting Love)" (Natalie Cole)	The Princess
4	Madame LaQueer	vs.	Milan	"Trouble" (Pink)	Madame LaQueer
5	Kenya Michaels	vs.	Milan	"Vogue" (Madonna)	Kenya Michaels
6	Jiggly Caliente	vs.	Milan	"Born This Way" (Lady Gaga)	Milan
7	Jiggly Caliente	vs.	Willam	"Mi Vida Loca (My Crazy Life)" (Pam Tillis)	Jiggly Caliente
8	Phi Phi O'Hara	vs.	Sharon Needles	"It's Raining Men... The Sequel" (Martha Wash and RuPaul)	None (Note: Because of Willam’s disqualification after the lip sync, both queens in the bottom were saved.)
9	DiDa Ritz	vs.	Latrice Royale	"I've Got to Use My Imagination" (Gladys Knight & the Pips)	DiDa Ritz
10	Kenya Michaels	vs.	Latrice Royale	"(You Make Me Feel Like) A Natural Woman" (Aretha Franklin)	Kenya Michaels
11	Chad Michaels	vs.	Latrice Royale	"No One Else on Earth" (Wynonna Judd)	Latrice Royale
13	Chad Michaels vs. Phi Phi O'Hara vs. Sharon Needles			"Glamazon" (RuPaul)	None

== Guest judges ==
Listed in chronological order:

- Elvira, Mistress of the Dark, actress and television hostess
- Mike Ruiz, photographer
- Rick Fox, professional basketball player
- John Salley, professional basketball player
- Amber Riley, actress and singer
- Natalie Cole, actress, pianist, singer and songwriter
- Nicole Sullivan, actress, comedian, voice artist
- Max Mutchnick, television producer
- Loretta Devine, actress
- Ross Mathews, comedian and television personality
- Kelly Osbourne, television host, actress, and singer
- Pauley Perrette, actress, singer, and writer
- Regina King, actress
- Pam Tillis, singer and songwriter
- Lucian Piane, composer and music producer
- Pamela Anderson, actress and model
- Jennifer Tilly, actress
- Dan Savage, author
- Jeffrey Moran, Absolut Vodka marketing/branding executive
- Jesse Tyler Ferguson, actor
- Jennifer Love Hewitt, actress and singer
- Rose McGowan, actress
- Wynonna Judd, actress and singer

== Episodes ==
No. overall	No. in season	Title	Original release date
38	1	"RuPocalypse Now!"	January 30, 2012
Thirteen new queens enter the workroom. For the first mini-challenge, the queens do a photoshoot on a spinning platform while being sprayed with "hazardous waste". Jiggly Caliente wins the mini-challenge. For the main challenge, the queens create a post-apocalyptic couture outfit made from items looted from drag queen zombies. On the runway, Lashauwn Beyond, Sharon Needles and The Princess receive positive critiques, with Sharon Needles winning the challenge. Alisa Summers, Jiggly Caliente and Kenya Michaels receive negative critiques, with Kenya Michaels being safe. Alisa Summers and Jiggly Caliente lip-sync to "Toxic" by Britney Spears. Jiggly Caliente wins the lip-sync and Alisa Summers is the first queen to sashay away.: Guest Judges: Elvira, Mistress of the Dark and Mike Ruiz; Mini-Challenge: Photoshoot on a spinning platform while being sprayed with "hazardous waste"; Mini-Challenge Winner: Jiggly Caliente; Main Challenge: Create a post-apocalyptic couture outfit made from items looted from drag queen zombies; Challenge Winner: Sharon Needles; Challenge Prize: A custom designed gown from Sequin Queen; Bottom Two: Alisa Summers and Jiggly Caliente; Lip-Sync Song: "Toxic" by Britney Spears; Eliminated: Alisa Summers; Farewell Message: "Keep it cute ladies! Shady sisters 4-ever! ❤️ Alisa"
39	2	"WTF!: Wrestling's Trashiest Fighters"	February 6, 2012
For this week's mini-challenge, the queens create a "badonkadonk" with padding. Chad Michaels, Phi Phi O'Hara and Willam win the mini-challenge. For the main challenge, the queens create a wrestling storyline, with a backstage clip and an entertaining match in the ring.: Team Chad Michaels: Chad Michaels, Madame LaQueer, Milan and Sharon Needles; Team Phi Phi O'Hara: Kenya Michaels, Lashauwn Beyond, Latrice Royale and Phi Phi O'Hara; Team Willam: DiDa Ritz, Jiggly Caliente, The Princess and Willam; On the runway, category is Girly Girl Couture. Team Chad Michaels is the winning team, with Chad Michaels and Madame LaQueer both winning the challenge. Team Phi Phi O'Hara and Team Willam are the losing teams. DiDa Ritz, Lashauwn Beyond and The Princess receive negative critiques, with DiDa Ritz being safe. Lashauwn Beyond and The Princess lip-sync to "Bad Girls" by Donna Summer. The Princess wins the lip-sync and Lashauwn Beyond sashays away.: Guest Judges: Rick Fox and John Salley; Mini-Challenge: Create a "badonkadonk" with padding; Mini-Challenge Winners: Chad Michaels, Phi Phi O'Hara and Willam; Main Challenge: Create a wrestling storyline, with a backstage clip and an entertaining match in the ring; Runway Theme: Girly Girl Couture; Challenge Winners: Chad Michaels and Madame LaQueer; Challenge Prize: A selection of wigs from Risqué Wigs; Bottom Two: Lashauwn Beyond and The Princess; Lip-Sync Song: "Bad Girls" by Donna Summer; Eliminated: Lashauwn Beyond; Farewell Message: "Stay true 2 U + xoxo good luck! –Beyond!"
40	3	"Glamazons vs. Champions"	February 13, 2012
For this week's mini-challenge, the queens create hats with butterfly-shaped accessories for guest Piyah Martell, Internet diva and transgender teen born with caudal regression syndrome. Jiggly Caliente, Kenya Michaels and Phi Phi O'Hara win the mini-challenge. For the main challenge, the queens team up to produce and act in TV infomercials for RuPaul's Glamazon and Champion albums. Team Champion: DiDa Ritz - "Main Event"; Jiggly Caliente - "LadyBoy"; Latrice Royale - "Never Go Home Again"; Phi Phi O'Hara - "Jealous of My Boogie"; Sharon Needles - "Cover Girl (Put the Bass in Your Walk)"; Team Glamazon: Chad Michaels - "The Beginning"; Kenya Michaels - "Get Your Rebel On"; Madame LaQueer - "Responsitrannity"; Milan - "Superstar"; The Princess - "If I Dream"; Willam - "Click Clack (Make Dat Money)"; On the runway, category is Platinum and Gold. Chad Michaels, Kenya Michaels and Sharon Needles receive positive critiques, with Sharon Needles winning the challenge. DiDa Ritz, Madame LaQueer and The Princess receive negative critiques, with Madame LaQueer being safe. DiDa Ritz and The Princess lip-sync to "This Will Be (An Everlasting Love)" by Natalie Cole. DiDa Ritz wins the lip-sync and The Princess sashays away.: Guest Judges: Amber Riley and Natalie Cole; Mini-Challenge: Create hats with butterfly-shaped accessories for guest Piyah Martell, Internet diva and transgender teen born with caudal regression syndrome; Mini-Challenge Winners: Jiggly Caliente, Kenya Michaels and Phi Phi O'Hara; Main Challenge: In teams, produce and act in TV infomercials for RuPaul's Glamazon and Champion albums; Runway Theme: Platinum and Gold; Challenge Winner: Sharon Needles; Challenge Prize: A custom jewelry set from Fierce Drag Jewels; Bottom Two: DiDa Ritz and The Princess; Lip-Sync Song: "This Will Be (An Everlasting Love)" by Natalie Cole; Eliminated: The Princess; Farewell Message: "This is (only) the beginning [sic] ! Much Love - The Princess / I ❤️ U DIDA RITZ!"
41	4	"Queens Behind Bars"	February 20, 2012
For this week's mini-challenge, the queens pair up and paint each other's faces while handcuffed to one another and pose for a mug shot photoshoot. Madame LaQueer and Willam win the mini-challenge. For the main challenge, the queens team up and star in two different episodes of a sitcom.: Team Madame LaQueer: DiDa Ritz, Kenya Michaels, Madame LaQueer, Milan and Sharon Needles; Team Willam: Chad Michaels, Jiggly Caliente, Latrice Royale, Phi Phi O'Hara and Willam; On the runway, category is Television Premiere. Team Willam is the winning team, with Latrice Royale winning the challenge. Team Madame LaQueer is the losing team. Kenya Michaels, Madame LaQueer and Milan receive negative critiques, with Kenya Michaels being safe. Madame LaQueer and Milan lip-sync to "Trouble" by Pink. Milan wins the lip-sync and Madame LaQueer sashays away.: Guest Judges: Billy B, Nicole Sullivan and Max Mutchnick; Mini-Challenge: In pairs, paint each others faces while handcuffed to one another and pose for a mug shot photoshoot; Mini-Challenge Winner: Madame LaQueer and Willam; Main Challenge: In teams, star in two different episodes of a sitcom; Runway Theme: Television Premiere; Challenge Winner: Latrice Royale; Challenge Prize: A cruise courtesy of Al & Chuck Travel; Bottom Two: Madame LaQueer and Milan; Lip-Sync Song: "Trouble" by Pink; Eliminated: Madame LaQueer; Farewell Message: "Girls: Stay humble... People go up... You'll be on the way down! Kisses MLQ / Chad, Sharon, Milan, Dita [sic] = True Friends / Kenya : Botate Mami !"
42	5	"Snatch Game"	February 27, 2012
For this week's mini-challenge, the queens compete in a game called "Beat the Cock". Phi Phi O'Hara wins the mini-challenge. For the main challenge, the queens play the Snatch Game. Loretta Devine and Ross Mathews star as the celebrity contestants. The cast consisted of: Chad Michaels as Cher; DiDa Ritz as Wendy Williams; Jiggly Caliente as Snooki; Kenya Michaels as Beyoncé; Latrice Royale as Aretha Franklin; Milan as Diana Ross; Phi Phi O'Hara as Lady Gaga; Sharon Needles as Michelle Visage; Willam as Jessica Simpson; On the runway, category is Best Drag. Chad Michaels, Sharon Needles and Willam receive positive critiques, with Chad Michaels winning the challenge. Kenya Michaels, Milan and Phi Phi O'Hara receive negative critiques, with Phi Phi O'Hara being safe. Kenya Michaels and Milan lip-sync to "Vogue" by Madonna. Milan wins the lip-sync and Kenya Michaels sashays away.: Guest Judges: Loretta Devine and Ross Mathews; Mini-Challenge: Compete in a game called "Beat the Cock"; Mini-Challenge Winner: Phi Phi O'Hara; Main Challenge: Snatch Game; Runway Theme: Best Drag; Challenge Winner: Chad Michaels; Challenge Prize: A custom gown by Marco Marco; Bottom Two: Kenya Michaels and Milan; Lip-Sync Song: "Vogue" by Madonna; Eliminated: Kenya Michaels; Farewell Message: "[...] / I'll be waiting for you in my kindom [sic] / Phi-Phi - I love you - sisters 4 ever"
43	6	"Float Your Boat"	March 5, 2012
For this week's mini-challenge, the queens must gain the biggest crowd reaction in a wet T-shirt contest. Willam wins the mini-challenge. For the main challenge, the queens create and wear a pride float based on a color of the pride flag.: Chad Michaels - Pink; DiDa Ritz - Red; Jiggly Caliente - Orange; Latrice Royale - Turquoise; Milan - Yellow; Phi Phi O'Hara - Violet; Sharon Needles - Green; Willam - Indigo; On the runway, Latrice Royale, Phi Phi O'Hara and Willam receive positive critiques, with Willam winning the challenge. DiDa Ritz, Jiggly Caliente and Milan receive negative critiques, with DiDa Ritz being safe. Jiggly Caliente and Milan lip-sync to "Born This Way" by Lady Gaga". Jiggly Caliente wins the lip-sync and Milan sashays away.: Guest Judges: Billy B, Kelly Osbourne and Pauley Perrette; Mini-Challenge: Gain the biggest crowd reaction in a wet T-shirt contest; Mini-Challenge Winner: Willam; Main Challenge: Create and wear a parade float based on a color of the pride flag; Challenge Winner: Willam; Challenge Prize: A cruise courtesy of Al & Chuck Travel; Bottom Two: Jiggly Caliente and Milan; Lip-Sync Song: "Born This Way" by Lady Gaga; Eliminated: Milan; Farewell Message: "Say love n show love / Colored girl, why yo base look like chalk ? / Jiggly REPRESENT / Dwayne Milan"
44	7	"Dragazines"	March 12, 2012
For this week's mini-challenge, the queens read each other to filth. Latrice Royale wins the mini-challenge. For this week's main challenge, the queens create a magazine cover on a certain topic.: Chad Michaels - Fashion; DiDa Ritz - Food; Jiggly Caliente - Health & Fitness; Latrice Royale - Celebrity Gossip; Phi Phi O'Hara - Travel; Sharon Needles - Cat Lovers; Willam - Home Decor; On the runway, Phi Phi O'Hara and Sharon Needles receive positive critiques, with Phi Phi O'Hara winning the challenge. Chad Michaels, Jiggly Caliente, Latrice Royale and Willam receive negative critiques, with Chad Michaels and Latrice Royale being safe. Jiggly Caliente and Willam lip-sync to "Mi Vida Loca" by Pam Tillis. Willam wins the lip-sync and Jiggly Caliente sashays away.: Guest Judges: Regina King and Pam Tillis; Mini-Challenge: Reading is Fundamental; Mini-Challenge Winner: Latrice Royale; Main Challenge: Create a magazine cover on a certain topic; Challenge Winner: Phi Phi O'Hara; Challenge Prize: A cruise to the Bahamas courtesy of Al & Chuck Travel; Bottom Two: Jiggly Caliente and Willam; Lip-Sync Song: "Mi Vida Loca" by Pam Tillis; Eliminated: Jiggly Caliente; Farewell Message: "To my Bitchez / ❤️ y'all 2 Death! / C U @ da Reunion / Keep it Real" [Second Column:] "Luv the Dusty 'RPDR' Girls! ❤️ / Shady / I can get [censored] now! / ❤️ Dida / Jiggly Caliente"
45	8	"Frenemies"	March 19, 2012
For this week's mini-challenge, the queens take a polygraph test. Based on these results, the queens are then paired up for the main challenge, in which they must live sing a duet to "So Much Better Than You".: Chad Michaels and DiDa Ritz; Latrice Royale and Willam; Phi Phi O'Hara and Sharon Needles; On the runway, Latrice Royale and Willam win the challenge. Phi Phi O'Hara and Sharon Needles are announced as the bottom two and lip-sync to "It's Raining Men (The Sequel)" by Martha Wash and RuPaul. After the lip-sync, RuPaul announces that Willam has broken the rules, and will be disqualified from the competition immediately. Because of this disqualification, Phi Phi O'Hara and Sharon Needles both win the lip-sync.: Guest Judges: Lucian Piane, Pamela Anderson, and Jennifer Tilly; Mini-Challenge: Polygraph test administered by RuPaul; Main Challenge: In pairs, live sing a duet to "So Much Better Than You"; Challenge Winners: Latrice Royale and Willam; Challenge Prize: A custom corset, skirt, and brassiere from Versatile Corsets; Bottom Two: Phi Phi O'Hara and Sharon Needles; Lip-Sync Song: "It's Raining Men (The Sequel)" by Martha Wash and RuPaul; Disqualified: Willam; Farewell Message: "Hi, I showed my ass (a lot) so here's one for the road. Willam." (with a butt print on the mirror.)
46	9	"Frock the Vote!"	March 26, 2012
For this week's mini-challenge, the queens design an Absolut Vodka inspired shoe. Phi Phi O'Hara wins the mini-challenge. For the main challenge, the queens participate in a Presidential debate as the 2012 Wig Party candidate. On the runway, category is Inaugural Drag. Chad Michaels and Sharon Needles receive positive critiques, with Sharon Needles winning the challenge. DiDa Ritz, Latrice Royale and Phi Phi O'Hara receive negative critiques, with Phi Phi O'Hara being safe. DiDa Ritz and Latrice Royale lip-sync to "I've Got to Use My Imagination" by Gladys Knight & the Pips. Latrice Royale wins the lip-sync and DiDa Ritz sashays away. At the end of the episode, RuPaul tells the other queens that the judges will be voting one of the eliminated queens back into the competition.: Guest Judges: Dan Savage and Jeffrey Moran; Mini-Challenge: Design an Absolut Vodka inspired shoe; Mini-Challenge Winner: Phi Phi O'Hara; Main Challenge: Participate in a Presidential debate as the 2012 Wig Party candidate; Runway Theme: Inaugural Drag; Challenge Winner: Sharon Needles; Challenge Prize: A $5,000 gift certificate from Interior Illusions Home; Bottom Two: DiDa Ritz and Latrice Royale; Lip-Sync Song: "I've Got to Use My Imagination" by Gladys Knight & the Pips; Eliminated: DiDa Ritz; Farewell Message: "Ms. Cheese loves you! Stay true 2 U girl Chad, needles, latrice XXX P.S. Phi Phi: Thank love u"
47	10	"DILFs: Dads I'd Like to Frock"	April 2, 2012
RuPaul reveals that the judges have voted back Kenya Michaels, and she officially returns to the competition. For this week's mini-challenge, the queens give a teddy bear a makeover. Kenya Michaels wins the mini-challenge. For the main challenge, the queens makeover a DILF into a pregnant drag diva. On the runway, Chad Michaels and Phi Phi O'Hara receive positive critiques, with Phi Phi O'Hara winning the challenge. Kenya Michaels, Latrice Royale and Sharon Needles receive negative critiques, with Sharon Needles being safe. Kenya Michaels and Latrice Royale lip-sync to "(You Make Me Feel Like) A Natural Woman" by Aretha Franklin. Latrice Royale wins the lip-sync and Kenya Michaels sashays away.: Guest Judges: Jesse Tyler Ferguson and Jennifer Love Hewitt; Returned: Kenya Michaels; Mini-Challenge: Give a teddy bear a makeover; Mini-Challenge Winner: Kenya Michaels; Main Challenge: Makeover a DILF into a pregnant drag diva; Challenge Winner: Phi Phi O'Hara; Challenge Prize: A trip for two to Las Vegas courtesy of Al & Chuck Travel; Bottom Two: Kenya Michaels and Latrice Royale; Lip-Sync Song: "(You Make Me Feel Like) A Natural Woman" by Aretha Franklin; Eliminated: Kenya Michaels; Farewell Message: "Girl I say goodbye again! Thank your love. When I left this competition, I felt loved. I love you, and the winner is... I don't know. Kiss K.M."
48	11	"The Fabulous Bitch Ball"	April 9, 2012
For this week's mini-challenge, the queens have a bitchfest with puppets. Chad Michaels wins the mini-challenge. For the main challenge, the queens create three looks for the Bitch Ball: Daytime Dog Park, Pooch in a Purse and Canine Couture.: Chad Michaels - Chinese Crested Dog; Latrice Royale - Pomeranian Dog; Phi Phi O'Hara - Bloodhound Dog; Sharon Needles - Poodle Dog; On the runway, Phi Phi O'Hara and Sharon Needles receive positive critiques, with Sharon Needles winning the challenge. Chad Michaels and Latrice Royale receive negative critiques, are announced as the bottom two. They lip-sync to "No One Else on Earth" by Wynonna Judd. Chad Michaels wins the lip-sync and Latrice Royale sashays away.: Guest Judges: Rose McGowan and Wynonna Judd; Mini-Challenge: Everybody Loves Puppets; Mini-Challenge Winner: Chad Michaels; Main Challenge: The Bitch Ball; Runway Themes: Daytime Dog Park, Pooch in a Purse and Canine Couture; Challenge Winner: Sharon Needles; Challenge Prize: Crystal flower body jewelry made by Marianna Harutunian; Bottom Two: Chad Michaels and Latrice Royale; Lip-Sync Song: "No One Else on Earth" by Wynonna Judd; Eliminated: Latrice Royale; Farewell Message: "My divas Remember who you are, and what you stand for I love you and miss you all. Stay fierce!! Latrice Royale"
49	12	"RuPaul Rewind"	April 16, 2012
A look back on the highlights, low-lights, and previously unseen footage from the season as we race toward the climactic grand finale. RuPaul is joined by Shannel (season 1), Pandora Boxx (season 2) and Mariah (season 3) as they look back over the top 10 fits of fashion from the season so far. This episode also included a few clips of queens who didn't make it on the season, among them, Alaska, who later became a contestant on season 5, Magnolia Crawford, Joslyn Fox and April Carrión, who later became contestants on season 6, and Mrs. Kasha Davis, who later became a contestant on season 7.
50	13	"The Final Three"	April 23, 2012
For the final challenge of the season, the queens star in RuPaul's music video "Glamazon" and act in a dramatic scene with RuPaul. On the runway, category is Best Drag. It is announced that all three finalists will lip-sync to "Glamazon" by RuPaul. In a twist, RuPaul does not crown a queen, and says that the winner will be announced next episode in front of a live audience.: Special Guests: Candis Cayne and Mathu Andersen; Main Challenge: Star in RuPaul's music video "Glamazon" and act in a dramatic scene with RuPaul; Runway Theme: Best Drag; Lip-Sync Song: "Glamazon" by RuPaul; Eliminated: None
51	14	"Reunion"	April 30, 2012
The queens all return for the live grand finale. Ru catches up with all the eliminated queens. She then invites out Willam and she reveals that she invited over her husband to her hotel, which is a clear breach of the contract. It is announced that Latrice Royale is this season's Miss Congeniality. It is then announced that Sharon Needles is the winner, leaving Chad Michaels and Phi Phi O'Hara as the runners-up.: Miss Congeniality: Latrice Royale; Runners-up: Chad Michaels and Phi Phi O'Hara; Winner of RuPaul's Drag Race Season Four: Sharon Needles

== Marketing ==
In January 2012, Logo released the second running of Fantasy Drag Race, an online fan contest inspired by fantasy football where viewers assemble a team of three season four Drag Race contestants. Players receive and lose points based on their team's performance on the show, and can earn additional points by redeeming codes and performing tasks given out when episodes of the show first air. The highest scoring players receive Drag Race and NYX Cosmetics products, and one player wins a trip for two to the first stop on Logo's Drag Race Tour.

Already having a generous social media presence, Logo expanded its efforts across Facebook, Twitter, Tumblr, GetGlue, and Foursquare in preparation for the premiere of season four. Both RuPaul and contestants tweet live while the show airs, and LogoTalk! chat parties (featuring judges, contestants from previous seasons, and contestants from season four) occur on the official Logo website while participants watch new episodes. Season four specifically marks an increased interest from Logo in Tumblr, where the network publishes animated GIFs, contestant trading cards, and images that incorporate internet memes. Dan Sacher, VP of digital for VH1 and Logo, has stated that their online marketing efforts are part of helping the small network expand their fan base across as many outlets as possible.

== Reception ==
The premiere episode of season four averaged a 0.6 rating in the 18-49 demographic, totaling 481,000 viewers, and ranked as the highest-rated premiere in Logo's network history. Untucked totalled 254,000 viewers, marking the companion show's most watched debut. During the evening of the premiere, the show registered eight US trending topics on Twitter (including Jiggly Caliente, Sharon Needles, Phi Phi O'Hara, and Latrice Royale) and reached a 7th place ranking on Trendrr. Leading up to the first episode, the show's Facebook page saw an 89% increase (earning over half a million fans).

The season finale scored a 0.7 rating in the 18-49 demographic and drew 601,000 viewers total, while the reunion episode became the highest rated episode of the season. Season four's "RuPaul's Drag Race: Reunited" was also the highest-rated reunion in the franchise's history, seeing a 33% increase in the 18-49 demographic compared to season three. The reunion registered five trending topics on Twitter (including Sharon Needles, Phi Phi, Willam, and a new portmanteau Willam introduced to the show: "RuPaulogize"), and ranked 4th among non-sports cable programs for the night on Trendrr.

During season 4, the show's Twitter following increased by 77%, and the Facebook page accrued a 36% increase in likes. TV.com also declared it was the best reality show on television.
