= Queens Behind Bars =

- RuPaul's Drag Race episode
- Episode no.: Season 4 Episode 4
- Original air date: February 20, 2012

Guest appearances
- Max Mutchnick; Nicole Sullivan

Episode chronology
← Previous "Glamazons vs. Champions"	Next → "Snatch Game"
- RuPaul's Drag Race season 4

"Queens Behind Bars" is the fourth episode of the fourth season of the American reality competition television series RuPaul's Drag Race, which aired on Logo on February 20, 2012. The episode has contestants pose for fake mug shots for the mini challenge, and to act in the mock prison sitcom "Hot In Tuckahoe" for the main challenge. Max Mutchnick and Nicole Sullivan are guest judges, alongside regular panelists Billy B, RuPaul, and Michelle Visage.

== Episode ==
The ten remaining contestants are told to pair up to pose for fake mug shots. The pairs are as follows:

- Madame LaQueer and Willam
- Chad Michaels and Sharon Needles
- DiDa Ritz and Jiggly Caliente
- Kenya Michaels and Phi Phi O'Hara
- Latrice Royale and Milan

The contestants are handcuffed together and have to do each other's prison style make-up. Madame LaQueer and Willam win the challenge for their blue dye pack inspired looks making them team captains for the maxi challenge.

For the main challenge, the contestants star in the mock sitcom "Hot In Tuckahoe" starring four friends and one butch prison guard, "Large Marge". Madame LaQueer's team is made up of DiDa, Kenya, Milan, and Sharon and Phi Phi, Latrice, Chad, and Jiggly are on Willam's team. The contestants are directed by Will and Grace co-creator Max Mutchnick. He mentors the teams as they act in two innuendo-filled episodes, "Dressed in Beaver" starring team Madame LaQueer and "Mr Happy's Tasty Nuts" with team Willam. Latrice is cast as the prison guard and RuPaul asks if she will draw on personal experience as she previously served time. While directing Max Mutchnick specifically praises DiDa Ritz and Latrice Royale for their performances.

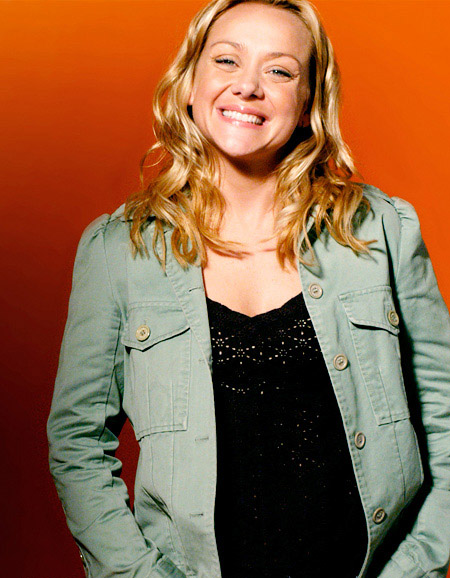
Nicole Sullivan is a guest judge.

Back in the Werk Room, Phi Phi O'Hara and Sharon Needles fight after the latter reveals she criticized the former's leadership skills the previous week on the main stage. This leads to a heated argument and Phi Phi O'Hara tells Sharon Needles to "Go back to Party City where you belong", criticizing the latter's 'costume' like drag, one of the most famous quotes from the show.

RuPaul introduces guest judges Mutchnick and Nicole Sullivan, and reveals the runway theme is "Television Premiere" (red carpet style outfits). On the main stage, the judges watch the performances. RuPaul declares Willam's team as the winners and Latrice Royale as the winner of the challenge. She wins a cruise. Willam's team are all declared safe and head backstage while Madame LaQueer's team are critiqued. Kenya Michaels and Milan are both praised for their runway looks but criticized for their acting in the challenge. The judges also note that Madame LaQueer made poor casting choices and performed badly in the challenge. DiDa Ritz is praised for her performance in the challenge but has negative critiques of her outfit. Mutchnick also critiques Sharon Needles for speaking back when being directed but Sullivan complements her unusual character. DiDa Ritz, Sharon Sullivan, and Kenya Michaels are declared safe and Madame LaQueer and Milan face off in a lip-sync contest to "Trouble" by P!NK. Milan wins the lip-sync and Madame LaQueer is eliminated from the competition.

== Reception and legacy ==
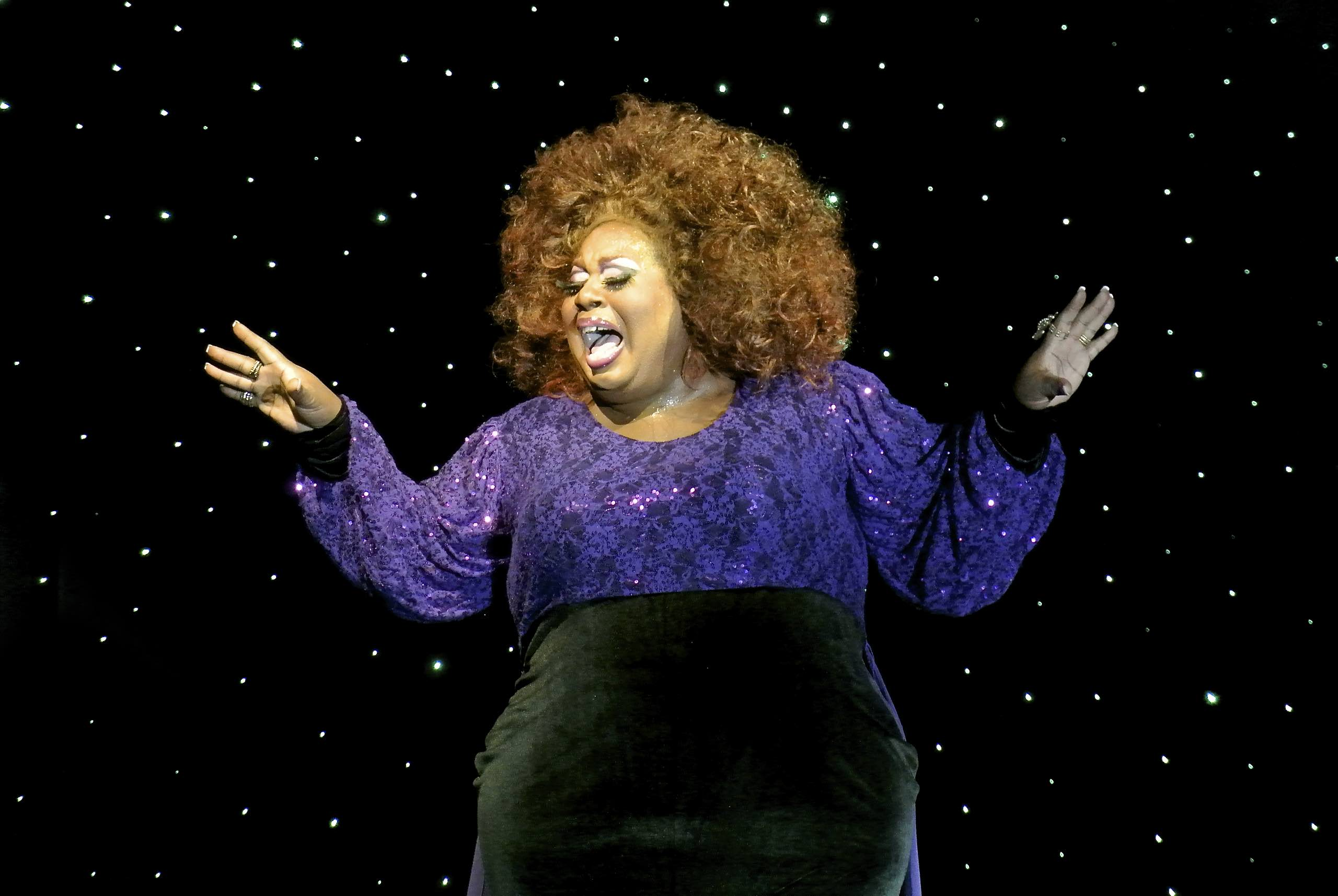
Latrice Royale (pictured in 2014) wins the episode's main challenge.

Oliver Sava of The A.V. Club said the mini challenge was "a brilliant challenge, forcing the queens to put their faces in the hands of another, and the smart pairs take advantage of the handicap and create a story around their messy makeup." The performances in the main challenge were criticised by Mark Peikert from Out magazine who says "The sitcoms are… leaden, I guess is the word. The judges cackle good-naturedly, but they’re mostly only impressed with Latrice and DiDa."

Latrice reprised the role of "Large Marge" for a mini challenge on season 7 episode 8 where the queens had to dress up as prisoners in "Tuckahoe Prison for Ladies". She also repurposed a quote from the episode, "Get those nuts away from my face!" as her entrance quote on the Holi-slay Spectacular episode where she entered saying "Get those chestnuts away from my face!"
