= Grand Finale (RuPaul's Drag Race season 12) =

- RuPaul's Drag Race episode
- Episode no.: Season 12; Episode 14
- Presented by: RuPaul
- Original air date: May 29, 2020

Guest appearances
- Nina West; Dolly Parton; Yvie Oddly

Episode chronology
← Previous "Alone Together"	Next → "The Pork Chop"

"Grand Finale" is the fourteenth and final episode of the twelfth season of the American television series RuPaul's Drag Race. It was filmed virtually becaused of the COVID-19 pandemic and originally aired on May 29, 2020. The episode tasks the final three contestants with performing lip-syncs to songs of their choice. There are also guest appearances by former contestants Nina West and Yvie Oddly, as well as American singer-songwriter Dolly Parton. After a final lip-sync between Crystal Methyd, Gigi Goode, and Jaida Essence Hall, the latter is crowned the season's winner.

== Episode ==
For the first time a virtual finale is held from remote locations across the country due to the impact of the COVI-19 pandemic. For the first lip-sync contest, the contestants all perform to "Bring Back My Girls" by RuPaul, with only their faces showing. The final three contestants then lip-sync alone to a song of their choice. Crystal Methyd lip-syncs to "I'm Like a Bird" (2000) by Nelly Furtado, Gigi Goode lip-syncs to "Take On Me" (1984) by A-ha, and Jaida Essence Hall lip-syncs to "Get Up" (2006) by Ciara featuring Chamillionaire. It is announced that Heidi N Closet is this season's Miss Congeniality. For the final lip-sync contest, Crystal Methyd, Gigi Goode, and Jaida Essence Hall perform to "Survivor" (2001) by Destiny's Child. It is announced that Jaida Essence Hall is the winner, making Crystal Methyd and Gigi Goode the runners-up.

== Production and broadcast ==
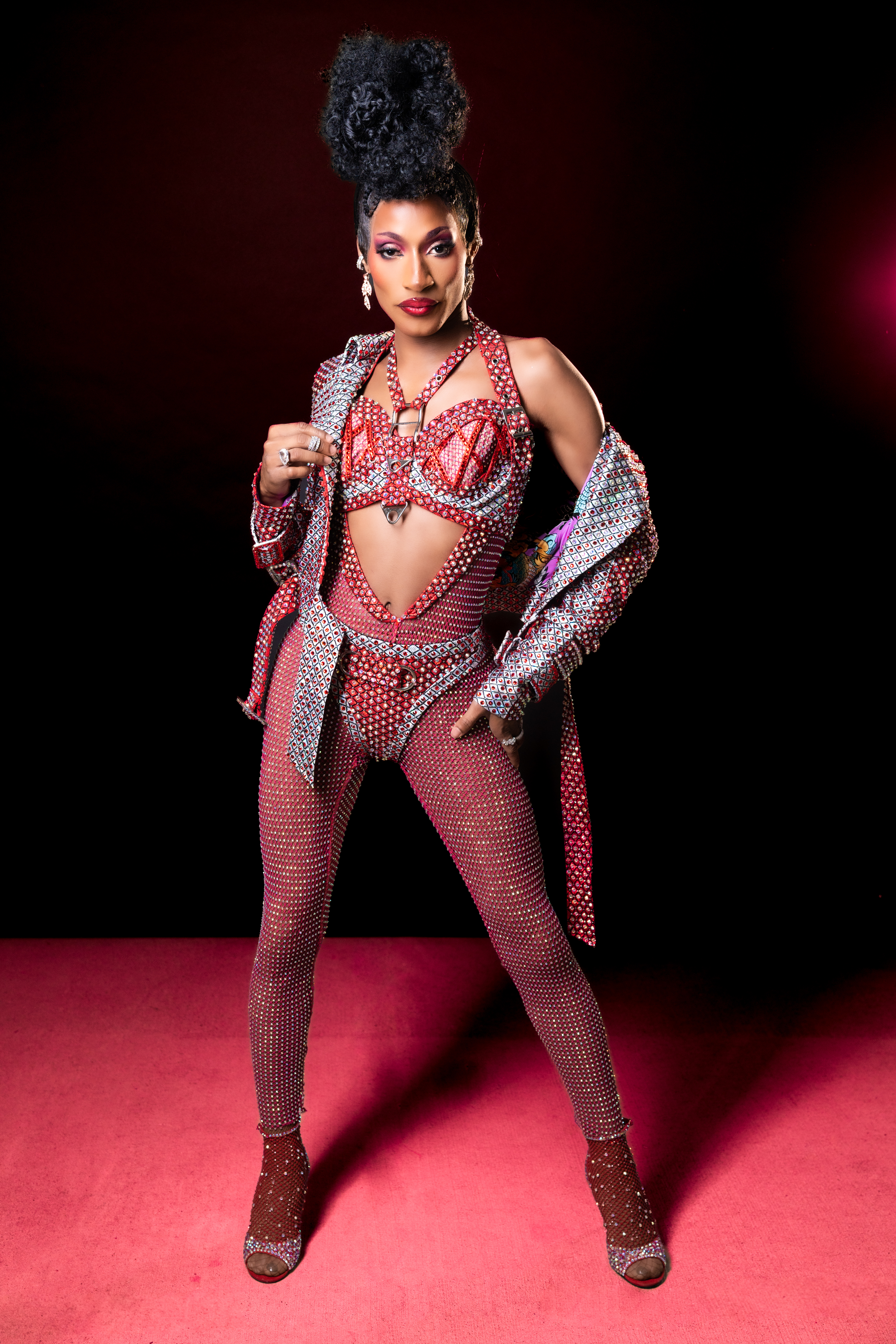
Jaida Essence Hall (pictured) is crowned the season's winner.

The episode originally aired on May 29, 2020. Former contestants Nina West and Yvie Oddly, as well as Dolly Parton make guest appearances.

Crystal Methyd portrays both a mother bird and a baby bird during "I'm Like a Bird". In 2021, Miles Griffis of the American animal welfare organization Audubon said the bird species in the video was "not positively identified". Jaida Essence Hall had the "most traditional" performance of the three finalists, according to Nylon, which said she delivered a "sexy, fishy rendition" of "Get Up" that used her couch and floor, and highlighted her face and hair.

=== Fashion ===
RuPaul wears a face mask.

== Reception ==
Kate Kulzick of The A.V. Club gave the episode a rating of 'A-'. Paul McCallion of Vulture rated the episode five out of five stars. Kevin O'Keeffe of Xtra Magazine said "staging their own digital drag shows made for one of the best finale challenges we've ever seen". Daniel Reynolds of The Advocate called the "I'm Like a Bird" performance "unforgettable". Sam Damshenas of Gay Times said Crystal Methyd "served one of the most batshit crazy performances in the show’s history; reenacting the life cycle of a bird and regurgitating in her mouth".

== See also ==
- Impact of the COVID-19 pandemic on television
