= Madame LaQueer =

Puerto Rican drag performer and make-up artist

Madame Cassandra Uzumaki LaQueer
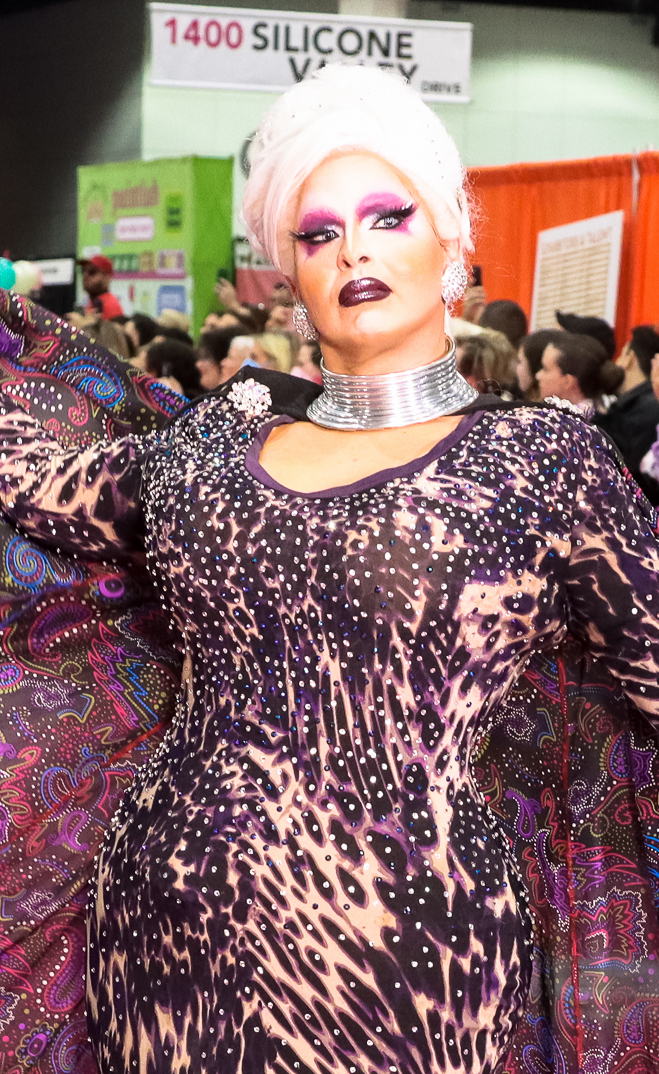
- Madame LaQueer at RuPaul's DragCon LA, 2023
- Born: 1982 or 1983 (age 42–43); Carolina, Puerto Rico
- Other names: Cassie Melendez; Madame LaQueer
- Occupations: Drag queen; make-up artist
- Television: RuPaul's Drag Race (season 4)
- Website: madamelaqueer.godaddysites.com

Madame Cassandra Uzumaki LaQueer (formerly Madame LaQueer) is the stage name of Cassie Melendez, a Puerto Rican drag performer and make-up artist who competed on season 4 of RuPaul's Drag Race. Originally from Carolina, Melendez moved to Orange County, California, where she works in the cosmetic industry, performs in drag shows, and livestreams on Twitch.

Madame LaQueer has continued to participate in Drag Race-related projects, appearing in a music video by fellow contestant Morgan McMichaels and attending RuPaul's DragCon LA as well as season finale tapings.

== Early life and education ==
Melendez was born in Carolina, Puerto Rico, in 1982 or 1983. She started doing drag on one of her birthdays as a teenager. She has a degree in computer programming.

== Career ==
Melendez is a drag performer who competed as Madame LaQueer on season 4 (2012) of the American television series RuPaul's Drag Race. She won the WWE-inspired drag wrestling challenge (tied with Chad Michaels) on the second episode, and placed tenth overall. She was eliminated from the competition in the fourth episode ("Queens Behind Bars"), after placing in the bottom two and losing a lip sync battle against Milan to "Trouble" (2003) by Pink. Sarah Martindale included Madame LaQueer in Bustle's 2015 list of twelve "plus size drag queens giving us all life". Thrillist's Brian Moylan ranked her number 102 out of the show's 113 contestants in 2017, and Instinct's Ryan Shea ranked her 95 out of Drag Race's 126 competitors in 2018.

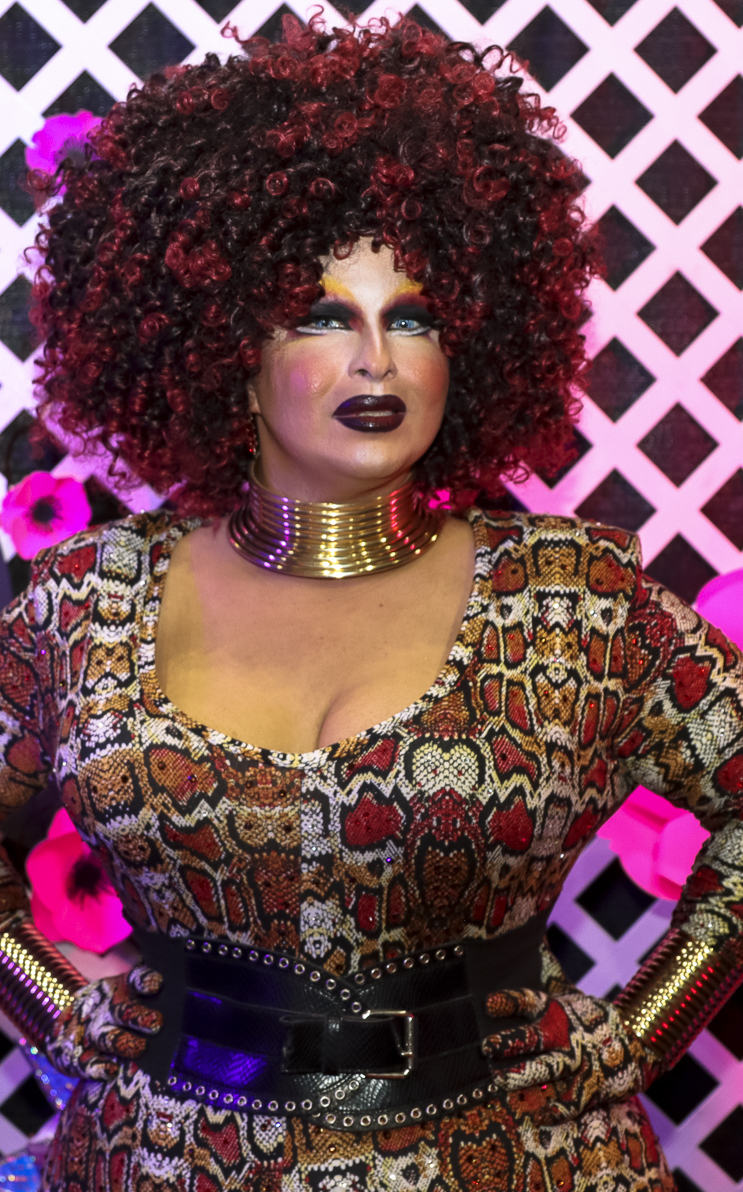
Madame LaQueer at RuPaul's DragCon LA in 2022

In 2017, Madame LaQueer participated in a drag show to raise funds for Puerto Rico residents impacted by the destructive Hurricane Maria. She has continued to participate in Drag Race-related projects. In 2020, she appeared in the music video for fellow contestant Morgan McMichaels's single "Ass Like Mine" (2020). Madame LaQueer has featured at Drag Race conventions, including RuPaul's DragCon LA in 2022, and appeared in season finale tapings of the show. That year, she was the grand marshal of Bell's inaugural Southeast LA Pride Festival, in which she also performed.

Outside of drag, Melendez has managed the beauty department of a drug store in Southern California. As of 2017, she was a make-up artist in Santa Ana and continued to perform at VLVT Lounge.

== Personal life ==
Melendez relocated to Orange County, California, on April 20, 2013, after competing in Drag Race. In January 2024, she came out as a trans woman on social media, and revealed her new names in and out of drag as Madame Cassandra Uzumaki LaQueer and Cassie, respectively. She streams a variety of PlayStation games on Twitch.

Madame LaQueer has had as many as seventeen "drag daughters" (or mentees), including Lineysha Sparx, who competed on season 5 of Drag Race.

== Filmography ==
=== Television ===
- RuPaul's Drag Race (season 4)

=== Web series ===
- Fashion Photo RuView (2017)
