= Dwayne Cooper =

American actor and entertainer

- Other names: Dwayne Milan; Milan
- Education: University of South Carolina
- Occupations: Actor; drag queen
- Television: RuPaul's Drag Race (season 4)

Dwayne Cooper, also known by the drag persona Milan and as Dwayne Milan, is an American actor and entertainer who competed on the fourth season of RuPaul's Drag Race. On stage, Cooper has had roles in multiple national tours, and he performed in Broadway productions of Hairspray and Motown: The Musical. Raised in Florence, South Carolina, Cooper relocated to New York City.

== Early life and education ==
Dwayne Cooper was raised in Florence, South Carolina, and attended West Florence High School. Involved in many school activities, he was student government president in 1993, during his senior year. Cooper attended the University of South Carolina, initially planning to major in journalism but opting for theatre instead.

== Career ==
Cooper is an actor and entertainer who competed in drag as Milan on the fourth season of RuPaul's Drag Race. Since appearing on the show, Cooper has only performed in drag for acting roles, such as when he played a drag queen in the film Spoiler Alert. On stage, Cooper has acted in national tours of Show Boat and Smoky Joe's Cafe, and in a production of Suessical. He was among the cast of Smoky Joe's Cafe which received the award for 'Outstanding Ensemble, off-Broadway' at the Chita Rivera Awards for Dance and Choreography in 2019. On Broadway, Cooper performed as Thad in Hairspray, in the ensemble of Motown: The Musical, and as a swing in the 2023 revival of Sweeney Todd. He has been credited as the first Drag Race contestant to land a role on Broadway.

Cooper is also part of the Doo Wop Project, a supergroup of Broadway actors who perform pop songs from the Great American Songbook. According to Denise Leslie of the Pagosa Daily Post, Cooper has been described as a "modern day Sammy Davis Jr. meets Barry White".

=== RuPaul's Drag Race ===
On Drag Race, Milan placed ninth overall. On the fourth episode ("Queens Behind Bars"), she placed in the bottom two of an acting challenge and defeated Madame LaQueer in a lip-sync to the 2003 song "Trouble" by Pink. For the Snatch Game challenge of the fifth episode, Milan impersonated Diana Ross. Her performance landed her in the bottom two again, and she beat Kenya Michaels in a lip-sync to the 1990 song "Vogue" by American singer Madonna. Milan was eliminated on the sixth episode ("Float Your Boat"), when she was placed in the bottom two of the design challenge which required contestants to create and wear pride-themed floats. She lost a lip-sync against Jiggly Caliente to the 2011 song "Born This Way" by Lady Gaga, during which Milan removed her dress, jewelry, and wig.

During one of the runway shows, Milan wore a tuxedo outfit inspired by Janelle Monáe. Ethan LaCroix and Jillian Anthony ranked her eighth in Time Out New York's 2015 list of New York City-based contestants and opined: "Milan was never really a contender ... but she sure was entertaining while she lasted. She defied the judges week after week with her barely there makeup and her lip-synch performances that involved dress rending and wig tossing, leaving her spent and nearly naked on the runway." Patrick Crowley ranked her number 23 in Billboard's 2016 list of Snatch Game performances.

In 2018, Michael Cuby included the disagreement between Milan and Willam on the third episode of the companion series RuPaul's Drag Race: Untucked in American online LGBT magazine Them's list of the ten "messiest fights" on Drag Race. In The Spinoff's 2019 "definitive ranking" of 162 Drag Race lip-syncs to date, Sam Brooks ranked Milan's battles against Jiggly Caliente, Kenya Michaels, and Madame LaQueer numbers 129, 73, and 69, respectively. Chris Kelly included Milan's dragging split, described by Willam as "[swiffering] the floor with her taint", in Queerty's 2018 list of the show's ten best lip-sync "stunts, shocks and shenanigans".

== Personal life ==
Cooper lived in New York City as of 2011. He has credited Nashom Wooden of the electronic dance music group The Ones for helping him break into the drag scene. He once staged a show for the group.

== Filmography ==
=== Television ===
- RuPaul's Drag Race (season 4)

== See also ==
- LGBTQ culture in New York City
- List of people from New York City
- List of University of South Carolina people
