= DiDa Ritz =

American drag performer

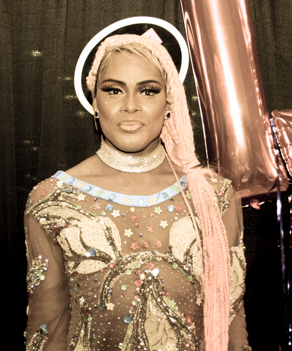
- DiDa Ritz at RuPaul's DragCon LA, 2018
- Born: Xavier Hairston; December 20
- Occupation: Drag queen
- Television: RuPaul's Drag Race (season 4)

DiDa Ritz is the stage name of Xavier Hairston, an American drag performer who competed on season 4 of RuPaul's Drag Race. DiDa Ritz is based in Chicago, where she performs regularly and hosts Drag Race viewing parties. Her performance of "This Will Be" by Natalie Cole during a lip-sync contest has been deemed among the show's best.

== Early life ==
Xavier Hairston was raised by a pastor in Lansing, Michigan. He moved to Chicago after graduating from high school.

== Career ==
Hairston performs in drag as DiDa Ritz. She competed on season 4 (2012) of RuPaul's Drag Race, and performed regularly at Chicago's Hydrate Nightclub at the time. In 2017, DiDa Ritz attended the "Fashion Does Drag" Ball, hosted by former Drag Race judge Marc Jacobs during New York Fashion Week. She performed in the drag show "Black Girl Magic" with Drag Race contestants Asia O'Hara, Mayhem Miller, Shea Couleé, and The Vixen, in Detroit in 2018.

In 2020, DiDa Ritz participated in RuPaul's Digital DragCon, which replaced RuPaul's DragCon LA because of the COVID-19 pandemic. She also joined the thousands participating in the Drag March for Change, "[demanding] justice for the multiple black people who have died due to police brutality," emphasizing members of the LGBTQ+ community. Additionally, she was in the line-up for an online benefit concert, organized by the Chicago Artists' Relief Fund and Rattleback Records, for artists (especially those of color) unemployed due to COVID-19. DiDa Ritz also performed regularly at Chicago's gay bar and nightclub Berlin; according to The New York Times, in 2020, she helped lead a demonstration from the club along Halsted Avenue, demanding better pay and working conditions for drag performers.

DiDa Ritz has continued to host LGBTQ events and tour throughout the United States. In 2021, Out included her in a list of the top 30 "movers and shakers" in queer nightlife. As of 2021, she has hosted RuPaul's Drag Race All Stars viewing parties at Hydrate Nightclub. In 2022, she performed at Pridefest in Bloomington, Indiana, and at the Official Unofficially Official Club Renaissance Party, which was organized the same weekend as Beyoncé's Renaissance World Tour in Chicago.

=== RuPaul's Drag Race ===
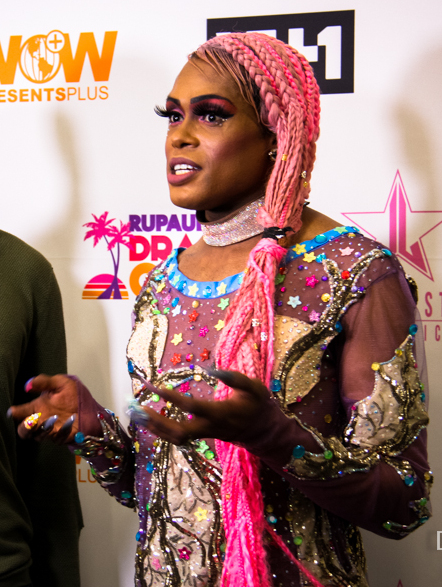
DiDa Ritz at RuPaul's DragCon LA in 2018

On Drag Race, DiDa Ritz did not win any main challenges and placed sixth overall. On the third episode, she placed in the bottom two of an infomercial challenge and defeated The Princess in a lip-sync to "This Will Be" (1975) by Natalie Cole, who was serving as a guest judge. DiDa Ritz impersonated Wendy Williams for the Snatch Game challenge. She was eliminated on the ninth episode, which featured a comedy challenge in the form of a "Frock the Vote" debate. She placed in the bottom two and lost the lip-sync battle against Latrice Royale to "I've Got to Use My Imagination" (1973) by Gladys Knight & the Pips.

DiDa Ritz was at times ostracized by judges and fellow contestants as "not perpetuating the hyper-glamorized look of professional drag", leading to her portrayal by editors as the antagonist within the context of the show. Despite this, her high points within the season included the aforementioned rendition of "This Will Be", judged by Cole herself, who engaged in a call-and-response duet with DiDa Ritz. Her performance mimed Cole's wide-eyed expressions and rhythmic dancing as Cole ad-libbed along, gospel-style. According to author Jennifer O'Meara, Cole's response to the performance "can be read as a validation that such lip-synching, with its corresponding 'body talk', takes real skill".

The "This Will Be" lip-sync has been described by PinkNews and Pride.com as the best of the season and among the best of all time. Pride.com said DiDa Ritz "gave her all to every single lyric and beat in the song. The Princess didn't do poorly, but DiDa Ritz gave us a legitimate lip sync masterclass!" Latrice Royale described DiDa Ritz's performance as "high drag at its finest". In 2018, Drag Race contestant Alyssa Edwards said the lip-sync was among her top five favorites from the show. In The Spinoff's 2019 "definitive ranking" of Drag Race lip-syncs to date, Sam Brooks ranked DiDa Ritz's battles against Latrice Royale and The Princess numbers 35 and 20 out of 162, respectively. Brooks called the "This Will Be" lip-sync "one of the most joyous ... of all time" and wrote, "Not only does DiDa Ritz channel Natalie Cole in her prime, she confirms herself as a contender here. It's a perfect match of song, energy and performer, only marred by the queen she has to share the stage with".

In Bustle's 2021 list of 17 lip-syncs "that left RuPaul and viewers gagged", Mary Kate McGrath said DiDa Ritz delivered "pure joy" and was the season's "lip-sync assassin". In his 2021 list of the ten best "one-sided" lip-syncs, Screen Rant's Ben Orosz wrote:

The lovable queen from season 4 delivered one of the show's most seminal moments in this lip sync. She embodied the song through pure joy and enthusiasm and didn't rely on splits or dips to make an impression. The Princess certainly did a fine job and was far from a failure, but it was impossible not to be captivated by Dida. She made sure to make eye contact with the singer and her thousand-watt smile was infectious.

In 2022, the website's Cailyn Szelinski said the performance "cemented her place as one of the most entertaining Drag Race queens who deserved more recognition on their season", and Out included the lip-sync in a list of the show's seven best performances, according to judge Michelle Visage.

== Personal life ==
Hairston is based in Chicago, and has also lived in Detroit.

DiDa Ritz's name is inspired by Dita Von Teese. She is a member of the House of Hall, a drag "family" which also includes fellow Drag Race contestants Jaida Essence Hall, Kahmora Hall, and Naysha Lopez.

== Filmography ==
=== Television ===
- RuPaul's Drag Race (season 4)

== See also ==
- LGBTQ culture in Chicago
