= Andy Cohen =

American radio and television talk show host (born 1968)

- Cohen in 2026
- Born: Andrew Joseph Cohen; June 2, 1968 (age 58); St. Louis, Missouri, U.S.
- Education: Boston University (BS)
- Occupations: Talk show host; radio host; author; producer
- Years active: 1990–present
- Partner: Kevin Sobieski (2025-present)
- Children: 2

Andrew Joseph Cohen (born June 2, 1968) is an American radio and television talk show host, producer, and writer. He is the host and executive producer of The Real Housewives franchise and Bravo's late night talk show, Watch What Happens Live! He also hosts a two-hour show with co-host John Hill twice a week on SiriusXM.

Cohen served as Bravo's executive vice president of Development and Talent until 2013. He was responsible for creating original content, developing innovative formats, and identifying new talent. Cohen also served as executive producer on the James Beard award–winning reality cooking competition television show, Top Chef. He also hosted the revival of the television dating show Love Connection. He has been awarded a Primetime Emmy Award, and five Peabody Awards.

== Early life ==
Andy was born in St. Louis, Missouri, to Evelyn and Lou Cohen. He has a sister, Emily Rosenfeld. He is Jewish, with roots in Poland, Russia, and Lithuania. Cohen graduated from Clayton High School in 1986. He is a graduate of Boston University, where he received a Bachelor of Science degree in broadcast journalism. Cohen wrote for the Boston University student newspaper, The Daily Free Press. He later interned at CBS News alongside Julie Chen, who was also working as an intern.

== Career ==
Cohen began his career in television as an intern at CBS News. He spent 10 years at the network, eventually serving as senior producer of The Early Show, a producer for 48 Hours, and a producer for CBS This Morning. He joined the television network Trio in 2000, later becoming vice president of original programming at Bravo in 2004, when the network purchased Trio.

Cohen was a regular guest on Today and Morning Joe, and has co-hosted Live! with Kelly, and The View. He has made various guest appearances on other talk shows. He has made several guest appearances on television shows playing himself, such as The Comeback and Saturday Night Live. In summer 2009, Cohen began hosting a weekly midnight television talk show, Watch What Happens Live. The show was later expanded into a weeknight series.

Cohen's autobiographical memoir Most Talkative (Henry Holt and Company), released in May 2012, became a New York Times Best Seller in the hardcover, paperback, and combined non-fiction categories.

On August 15, 2013, he declined to co-host the Miss Universe pageant in Russia, due to the country's recent adoption of anti-gay laws. Before that, he hosted Miss USA 2011 and Miss USA 2012. On March 22, 2014, he portrayed Zeus in Lady Gaga's music video for "G.U.Y.".

In November 2014, Cohen published his second memoir, The Andy Cohen Diaries: A Deep Look at a Shallow Year, inspired by the similarly titled The Andy Warhol Diaries. The book spans a year of journal entries beginning in September 2013. The Andy Cohen Diaries became a Times Best Seller in the Combined Print & E-Book Nonfiction category.

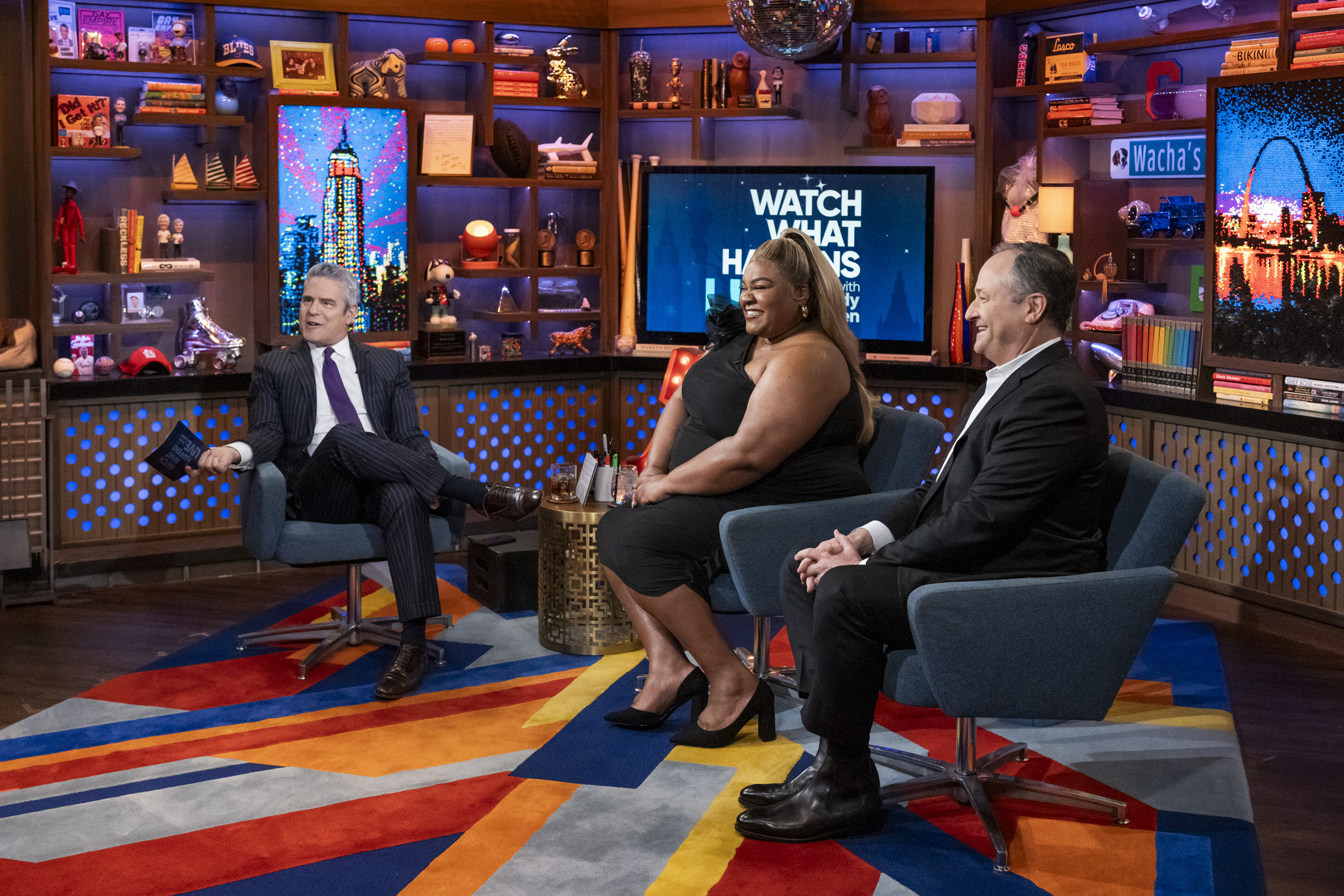
Cohen hosts Da'Vine Joy Randolph and Doug Emhoff on the set of Watch What Happens Live! in 2024

On September 14, 2015, SiriusXM launched a new radio channel curated by Cohen, known as Radio Andy. The channel features shows hosted by Cohen (Andy Cohen Live, and Andy Cohen's Deep & Shallow). Cohen also hosts a series of special broadcasts for his station known as Town Halls in front of a live studio audience. The channel also features shows hosted by Sandra Bernhard, Bevy Smith, Dan Rather, Michelle Collins, Jim Parsons, Jeff Lewis, Amy Phillips, Jonathan Alter (together with his family), John Hill, the producers of Watch What Happens Live, and the producers at World of Wonder. The channel has also produced specials, including: Radio Andy Theater, a parody of the Real Housewives franchise; AC2 Live: Andy and Anderson on the Road (a behind-the-scenes show following Cohen and Anderson Cooper on their live tour); and the Love Connection Diaries (also a backstage docu-series featuring Cohen and Love Connection producer (and Radio Andy host) John Hill).

Cohen and close friend Anderson Cooper announced that they would be going on a national tour to perform their conversational stage show AC2 beginning in March 2015. The tour opened in Boston, followed by Miami Beach, Chicago, and Atlanta. The idea for the show came about after Cooper interviewed Cohen about his then-latest book, The Andy Cohen Diaries, at an event at the 92nd Street Y in New York City. Since then, the two-man show has reached over 50 cities; the next set of tour stops are scheduled for early 2026.

On December 31, 2015, Cohen hosted a one-off live edition of Hollywood Game Night (New Year's Eve Game Night), and co-hosted New Year's Eve with Carson Daly for NBC.

In 2016, the publisher Henry Holt and Company announced it was launching the imprint Andy Cohen Books. Cohen's third memoir Superficial: More Adventures From the Andy Cohen Diaries was published in November 2016. A sequel to The Andy Cohen Diaries, the book covers diary entries for the subsequent two years. Superficial became a Times Best Seller among books written by celebrities.

In January 2017, Fox ordered a revival of Love Connection hosted by Cohen. The hour-long game show premiered on May 25. The same month, Cohen played himself on the Netflix series Unbreakable Kimmy Schmidt. In August 2017, Fox announced that it would renew Love Connection for a second season. Later that year, Cohen succeeded Kathy Griffin as co-host of CNN's New Year's Eve coverage alongside Cooper.

In 2018, Cohen played himself on the show Riverdale as a friend of the Lodge family. He made a March 2018 appearance as a guest judge in an episode of the VH1 reality-television series RuPaul's Drag Race.

Since December 2018, Cohen has co-hosted CNN's New Year's Eve coverage with Anderson Cooper.

On April 16, 2022, The Real Housewives star Nene Leakes filed a federal lawsuit against NBCUniversal, Bravo, production companies True Entertainment and Truly Original, and series producer Cohen for violating federal employment and anti-discrimination laws. She dismissed the action and claims on August 19, 2022.

Early in 2024, former Real Housewives stars Brandi Glanville and Leah McSweeney made headlines when they accused Cohen of sexual harassment and inappropriate and abusive behavior, specifically alleging that he pressured his cast to drink and to do drugs, and made sexually inappropriate comments (the latter of which Cohen reportedly characterized as a joke and apologized). In March 2024, an internal investigation by Bravo reportedly found that claims of harassment and misconduct made against Cohen by co-stars and cast on his shows were "unsubstantiated".

In November 2024, U.S. district judge Lewis J. Liman heard a case brought by McSweeney against Cohen, other producers, Bravo, and NBCUniversal. In March 2025, Liman dismissed the portion of the case brought against Cohen and three other producers while allowing three civil counts against the network to proceed. McSweeney filed an amended lawsuit against Cohen in May 2025, accusing him of orchestrating a coordinated campaign to discredit her.

Cohen did public service announcements on MTA's New York City Transit's subway system in December 2025.

== Personal life ==
Cohen is openly gay. In December 2018, he announced he would become a father in 2019 with the help of a surrogate. His son, was born February 4, 2019. His daughter, was born April 29, 2022.

Cohen supported Kamala Harris in the 2024 United States presidential election.

Cohen declared himself a "proud American Jew" and participated in a two-day summit for Jewish influencers in 2024.

In July 2025, Cohen began dating businessman Kevin Sobieski but kept it a secret for nearly a year before confirming it publicly in June.

== Filmography ==
=== Film ===
Year	Title	Role	Notes
2003	Easy Riders, Raging Bulls: How the Sex, Drugs and Rock 'N' Roll Generation Saved Hollywood	—N/a	Documentary; executive producer
2004	The N-Word	—N/a	Documentary; executive producer
2020	The Stand In	Himself	
2023	Rather	Himself	Documentary
2025	Oh. What. Fun.	Himself	Uncredited
2025	Barbara Walters: Tell Me Everything	Himself	Documentary
2026	Over Your Dead Body	Himself	

=== Television ===
Year	Title	Role	Notes
2004	Sex and the City	Shoe salesman	Episode: "Let There Be Light"
2006–present	The Real Housewives	Reunion host	Also executive producer
2009–present	Watch What Happens Live with Andy Cohen	Host	Also executive producer
2014	Alpha House	Himself	Episode: "There Will Be Water"
2014	The Comeback	Himself	Episode: "Valerie Makes a Pilot"
2014	Sesame Street	Himself	
2015–2026	The Late Show with Stephen Colbert	Himself	16 episodes, including the series finale
2015	Lip Sync Battle	Himself	Episode: "Willie Geist vs. Andy Cohen"
2016	Inside Amy Schumer	Himself	Episode: "Rubbing Our Clips"
2016	Nightcap	Himself	Series premiere
2017	Unbreakable Kimmy Schmidt	Himself	Episode: "Kimmy and the Trolley Problem"
2017–2018	Love Connection	Host	
2017	Difficult People	Himself	Episode: "The Silkwood"
2017–present	New Year's Eve Live	Co-host	
2018	RuPaul's Drag Race (season 10, 2nd episode)	Special guest	Episode: "PharmaRusical"
2018	Riverdale	Himself	Episode: "Primary Colors"
2019	The Other Two	Himself	Episode: "Chase Shoots a Music Video"
2020	Who Wants to Be a Millionaire?	Himself	Episode: "In the Hot Seat: Anderson Cooper and Andy Cohen"
2020	The Not-Too-Late Show with Elmo	Himself	Episode: "Andy Cohen/Josh Groban"
2021	For Real: The Story of Reality TV	Host	
2023	The Traitors	Himself	Episode: "The Reunion"
2023	Gossip Girl	Himself	Episode: "I Am Gossip"
2023	Moon Girl and Devil Dinosaur	Isaac Calderon (voice)	Recurring
2023	American Horror Story: Delicate	Himself	Episode: "Multiply Thy Pain"
2025	And Just Like That...	Daniel	Episode: "Present Tense"
2026	Love Island USA (season 8)	Reunion Host	Episode: “Reunion”

== Bibliography ==
- Most Talkative: Stories from the Front Lines of Pop Culture. Henry Holt and Company. 2012. ISBN 978-0-8050-9583-8.
- The Andy Cohen Diaries: A Deep Look at a Shallow Year. Henry Holt and Company. 2014. ISBN 978-1-627-79228-8.
- Superficial: More Adventures from the Andy Cohen Diaries. Henry Holt and Company. 2016. ISBN 978-1250116482.
- Glitter Every Day: 365 Quotes from Women I Love. Henry Holt and Company. 2021. ISBN 978-1-250-83239-9.
- The Daddy Diaries: The Year I Grew Up. Henry Holt and Company. 2023. ISBN 978-1250890924.
- Andy's Bravo Scrapbook: Twenty Years Behind the Scenes of the Real Housewives and the Bravoverse. Andy Cohen Books. 2026. ISBN 979-8-217-09014-3.

== Awards and nominations ==
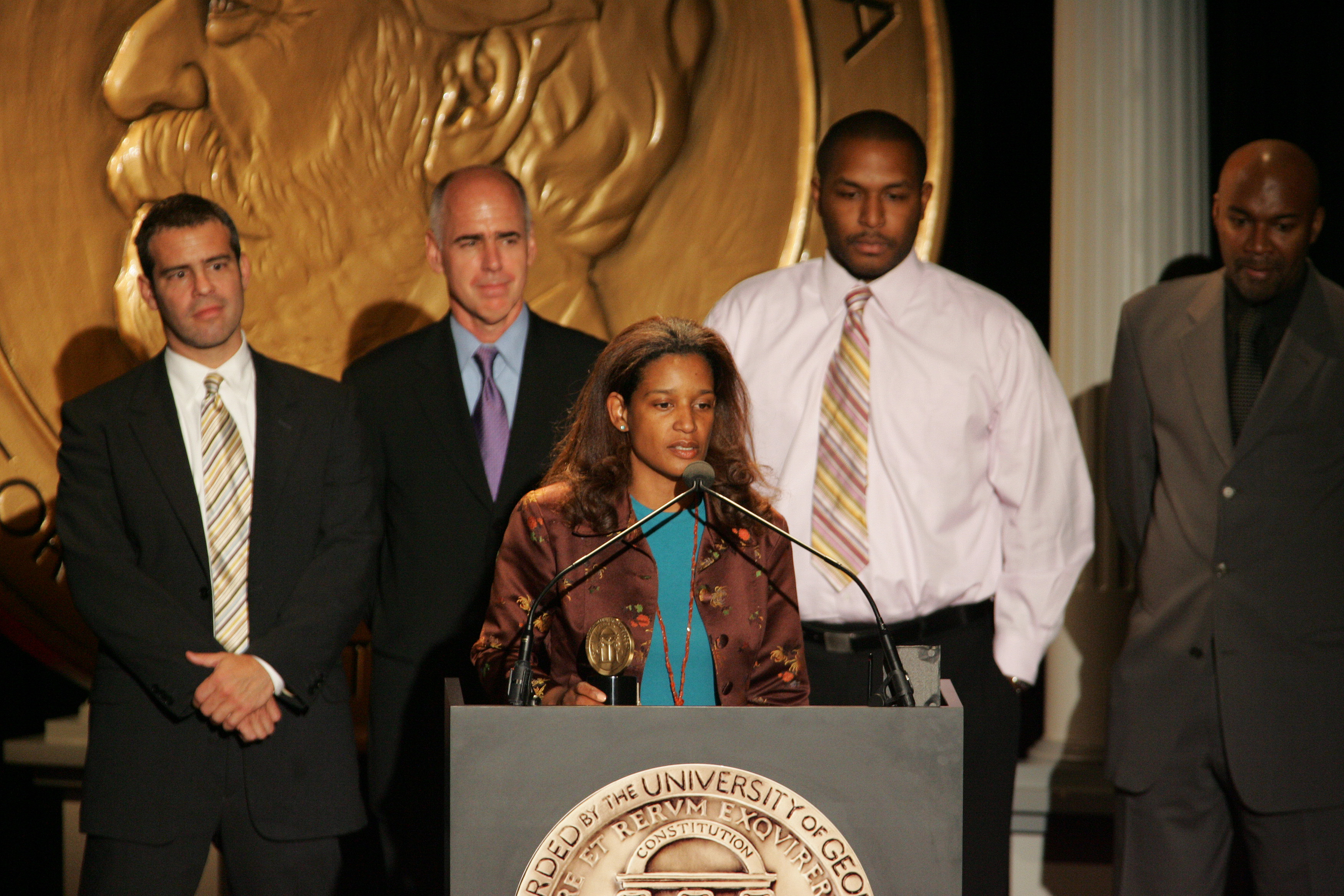
Cohen (left) among the creators of The N-Word receiving an award at the 65th Annual Peabody Awards in 2004

=== GLAAD Media Awards ===
Year	Category	Work	Result	Ref.
2019	Vito Russo Award	Himself	Honored	
2021	Outstanding Variety or Talk Show Episode	Watch What Happens Live with Andy Cohen: "Andy Cohen Calls for Change So He Can Donate His Plasma"	Nominated	
2023	Outstanding Variety or Talk Show Episode	Watch What Happens Live with Andy Cohen: "Jackie Goldschneider & Danny Pellegrino"	Nominated	
2024	Outstanding Variety or Talk Show Episode	Watch What Happens Live with Andy Cohen: "Cynthia Nixon and Kim Petras"	Nominated	
2026	Outstanding Variety or Talk Show Episode	Watch What Happens Live with Andy Cohen: "Max Salvador and Victoria SanJuan"	Nominated	

=== Peabody Awards ===
Year	Work	Result	Ref.
2004	The N-Word	Won	
2008	Project Runway	Won	
2010	Wonders of the Solar System	Won	
2016	Hooligan Sparrow	Won	
2024	To Kill a Tiger	Won	

=== Primetime Emmy Awards ===
Year	Category	Work	Result	Ref.
2005	Outstanding Reality Program	Queer Eye for the Straight Guy	Nominated	
2005	Outstanding Reality Program	Project Greenlight	Nominated	
2006	Outstanding Reality-Competition Program	Project Runway	Nominated	
2007	Outstanding Reality-Competition Program	Project Runway	Nominated	
2007	Outstanding Reality-Competition Program	Top Chef	Nominated	
2008	Outstanding Reality-Competition Program	Top Chef	Nominated	
2008	Outstanding Reality-Competition Program	Project Runway	Nominated	
2009	Outstanding Reality - Competition Program	Project Runway	Nominated	
2009	Outstanding Reality - Competition Program	Top Chef	Nominated	
2009	Outstanding Variety, Music Or Comedy Special	Kathy Griffin: She'll Cut A Bitch	Nominated	
2009	Outstanding Reality Program	Kathy Griffin: My Life on the D-List	Nominated	
2010	Outstanding Reality Program	Kathy Griffin: My Life on the D-List	Nominated	
2010	Outstanding Reality - Competition Program	Top Chef	Won	
2011	Outstanding Reality - Competition Program	Top Chef	Nominated	
2011	Outstanding Reality Program	Kathy Griffin: My Life on the D-List	Nominated	
2012	Outstanding Variety Special	Kathy Griffin: Tired Hooker	Nominated	
2012	Outstanding Reality - Competition Program	Top Chef	Nominated	
2012	Outstanding Reality - Competition Program	Top Chef	Nominated	
2018	Outstanding Creative Achievement in Interactive Media within an Unscripted Program	Watch What Happens Live with Andy Cohen	Nominated	

=== Miscellaneous honors ===
Year	Organization	Award	Nominated work	Result
2012	NewNowNext Awards	Most Addictive Reality Star	Himself	Nominated
2018	Webby Awards	Podcasts & Digital Audio, Interview/Talk Show	Watch What Happens Live with Andy Cohen	Won
2018	Critics' Choice Awards	Best Talk Show	Watch What Happens Live with Andy Cohen	Nominated
2018	People's Choice Awards	The Nighttime Talk Show of the Year	Watch What Happens Live with Andy Cohen	Nominated
2019	People's Choice Awards	The Nighttime Talk Show of the Year	Watch What Happens Live with Andy Cohen	Nominated
2020	People's Choice Awards	The Nighttime Talk Show of the Year	Watch What Happens Live with Andy Cohen	Nominated
2021	Critics' Choice Awards	Best Short Form Series	The Andy Cohen Diaries	Nominated
2021	MTV Movie + TV Awards	Best Talk/Topical Show	Watch What Happens Live with Andy Cohen	Nominated
2022	Hollywood Walk of Fame		Himself	Inducted
2022	People's Choice Awards	The Nighttime Talk Show of the Year	Watch What Happens Live with Andy Cohen	Nominated
2022	Critics' Choice Awards	Best Talk Show	Watch What Happens Live with Andy Cohen	Nominated
2023	Critics' Choice Awards	Best Talk Show	Watch What Happens Live with Andy Cohen	Nominated
2023	St. Louis Walk of Fame		Himself	Inducted
2024	Septimius Awards	Best Feature Documentary	To Kill a Tiger	Nominated
2024	People's Choice Awards	The Nighttime Talk Show of the Year	Watch What Happens Live with Andy Cohen	Nominated
2026	Critics' Choice Awards	Best Talk Show	Watch What Happens Live with Andy Cohen	Nominated

- 2007, Multichannel News' "40 Under 40" broadcasting executives.
- 2010, appeared on the TV Guide "Power List" of talked-about individuals.
- 2012, GQ's "25 Best Dressed Men of the Year",
- 2012, chosen as one of Broadcasting & Cable's "Digital All-Stars".
- 2012 to 2016, listed in Out magazine's list of Most Powerful Gay People.

== See also ==
- Broadcast journalism
- Entertainment journalism
- LGBTQ culture in New York City
- List of LGBTQ people from New York City
- New Yorkers in journalism

Preceded by Natalie Morales and Curtis Stone	Hosts of Miss USA with Giuliana Rancic; 2011 & 2012	Succeeded by Nick Jonas
Preceded by Bret Michaels	Hosts of Miss Universe with Natalie Morales; 2011	Succeeded by Andy Cohen
Preceded by Andy Cohen	Hosts of Miss Universe with Giuliana Rancic; 2012	Succeeded by Mel B and Thomas Roberts
