= 10s Across the Board =

- RuPaul's Drag Race episode
- Episode no.: Season 10; Episode 1
- Directed by: Nick Murray
- Original air date: March 22, 2018

Guest appearance
- Christina Aguilera

Episode chronology
← Previous "Grand Finale"	Next → "PharmaRusical"
- RuPaul's Drag Race season 10

"10s Across the Board" is the first episode of the tenth season of RuPaul's Drag Race. It originally aired on March 22, 2018. The episode's mini-challenge has contestants walk a runway in front of former contestants and the main challenge tasks current contestants with creating looks with limited resources. Christina Aguilera is a guest judge. Vanessa Vanjie Mateo is eliminated from the competition after placing in the bottom two and losing a lip-sync contest against Kalorie Karbdashian Williams to "Ain't No Other Man" by Aguilera. Vanessa Vanjie Mateo's exit line went viral and generated many memes on social media. The episode received three awards from seven nominations at the 70th Primetime Creative Arts Emmy Awards.

== Episode ==
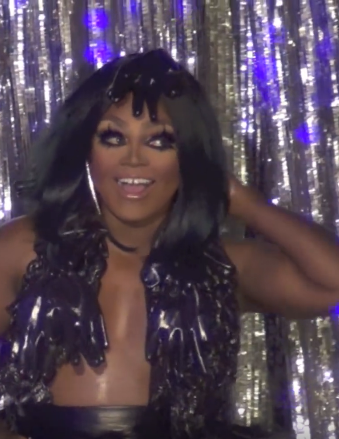
Mayhem Miller (pictured in 2018) wins the episode's main challenge.

The season's fourteen contestants enter the Werk Room one a time. RuPaul greets them and introduces the first mini-challenge, which tasks contestants with walking a runway surrounded by former competitors from the series. Among the visiting contestants are Adore Delano, Bob the Drag Queen, Chad Michaels, Darienne Lake, Delta Work, Derrick Barry, Detox, Jaymes Mansfield, Jessica Wild, Jiggly Caliente, Jinkx Monsoon, Jujubee, Katya, Kim Chi, Laganja Estranja, Manila Luzon, Mariah Paris Balenciaga, Morgan McMichaels, Mrs. Kasha Davis, Ongina, Pandora Boxx, Peppermint, Victoria "Porkchop" Parker, Raja, Raven, Tempest DuJour, and Trixie Mattel, and Yara Sofia.

Back in the Werk Room, the contestants get out of drag. RuPaul enters and reveals that Monét X Change is the winner of the mini-challenge. RuPaul then reveals the main challenge, which tasks contestants with creating looks with limited resources ("drag on a dime"). Members of the Pit Crew bring in various materials.

The contestants select their materials and work on their looks for the fashion show. Miz Cracker shares about her experience being raised in a lower income household. On a new day, the contestants put the final touches on their outfits and apply cosmetics. Eureka O'Hara shares about her experience getting injured on the previous season and her recovery process. She describes the joy she feels being able to dance again. Dusty Ray Bottoms discusses the origins of her signature dotted make-up pattern. The contestants notice the cosmetic similarities between Aquaria and Miz Cracker; Aquaria suggests this is a common occurrence.

On the main stage, RuPaul welcomes fellow judges Michelle Visage, Carson Kressley, and Ross Mathews. RuPaul introduces the challenge and the fashion show commences. RuPaul dismisses the contestants deemed safe and says another contestant is entering the competition. The new contestant, claimed to be Farrah Moan, is revealed to be Christina Aguilera. Mayhem Miller is declared the winner of the main challenge. Kalorie Karbdashian-Williams and Vanessa Vanjie Mateo place in the bottom and face off in a lip-sync contest to Aguilera's song "Ain't No Other Man" (2006). Kalorie Karbdashian-Williams wins the contest and Vanessa Vanjie Mateo is eliminated from the competition.

== Production ==
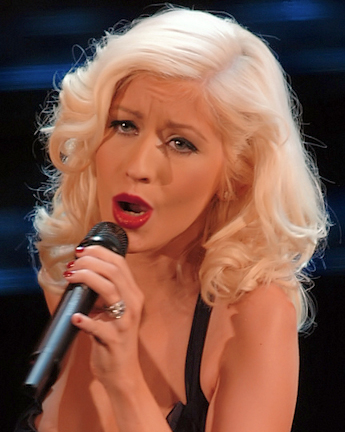
Christina Aguilera (pictured in 2006) is a guest judge; her song "Ain't No Other Man" is used for the episode's lip-sync contest.

Prior to the episode's lip-sync contest, Aguilera visits with the contestants back stage for the corresponding episode of RuPaul's Drag Race: Untucked.

=== Fashion ===
For the fashion show, Aquaria wears an outfit inspired by Little Bo-Peep with a large bow. She carries a cane and wears a large hat. Asia O'Hara's colorful outfit has various party materials. Kalorie Karbdashian-Williams's dress is made of fake dollar bills. Blair St. Clair presents a Vivienne Westwood-inspired outfit made from reflective sun visors. Dusty Ray Bottoms similarly has an outfit made from visors.

Kameron Michaels has an outfit with many flowers attached. Monét X Change's green-and-yellow outfit has many pieces of sponge attached. The Vixen's outfit is made of pool noodles. Mayhem Miller presents a black dress made from bin bags and other materials. Eureka carries a purse with a stuffed dog and she sucks on a lollipop. Part of her outfit has a print depicting doughnuts.

Monique Heart's outfit has playing cards. Vanessa Vanjie Mateo has dolls attached to her mostly pink outfit. Yuhua Hamasaki's outfit has yellow barricade tape and she has a headpiece shaped like an ankh. Miz Cracker wears a widow-inspired dress.

== "Miss Vanjie" ==
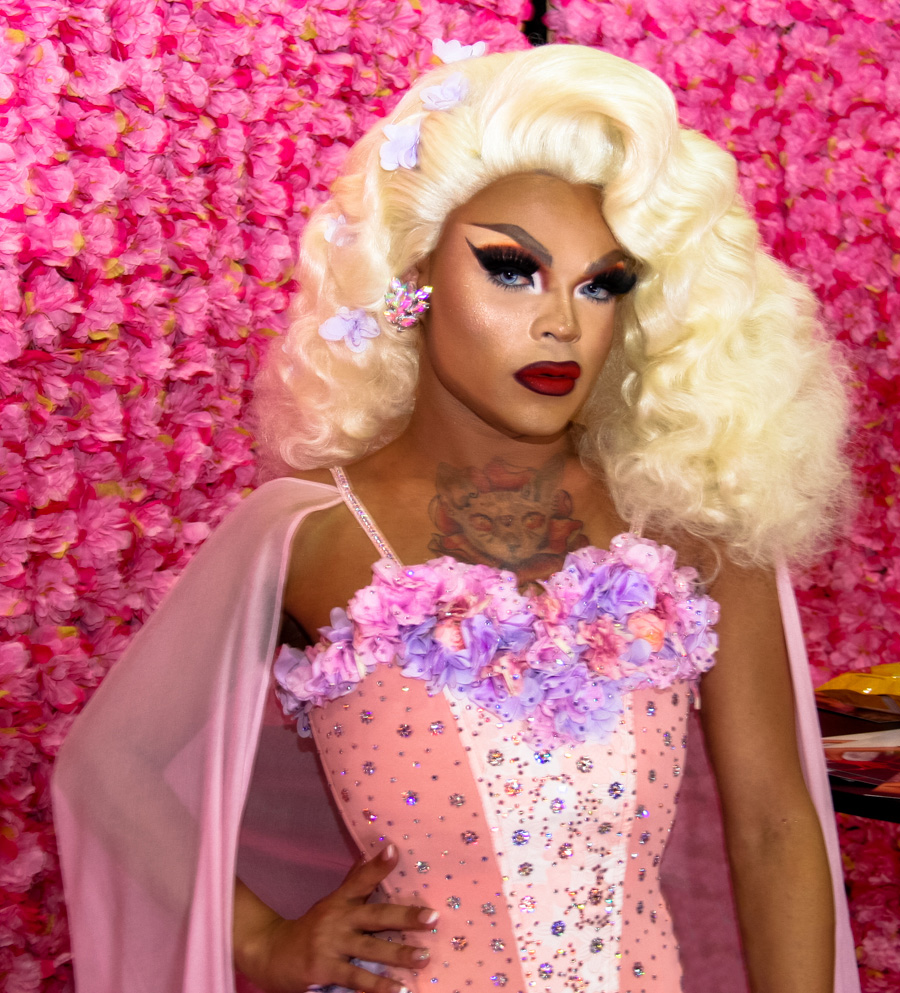
Vanessa Vanjie Mateo (pictured at RuPaul's DragCon LA in 2018) is the season's first contestants to be eliminated from the competition.

Upon being eliminated, Vanessa Vanjie Mateo left the main stage by walking backwards and repeating the phrase "Miss Vanjie" three times. According to Marcus Wratten of PinkNews, "the Internet was awash with memes, merch and demands for her to make a big return". Wratten included her exit in the website's 2023 list of "the most hilarious yet underrated Drag Race exit lines ever". The website's Charlie Duncan called Vanessa Vanjie Mateo's exit "iconic" in 2022.

Vanessa Vanjie Mateo's exit ranked second in BBC's list of the funniest Drag Race meme's in the last decade. In Screen Rant's 2023 ranking of the show's "most iconic" quotes, Michelle Konopka Alonzo said "no farewell statement has made more of a cultural impact" than Vanessa Vanjie Mateo's. Alonzo said she "unintentionally affected the rest of season 10 and single-handedly changed RuPaul's life by repeating her name as she exited the main stage. Vanjie's quirky but catchy phrase was frequently mentioned by Michelle Visage, RuPaul, and the other queens as the episodes progressed; Vanjie's popularity later led to her return on RPDR season 11." RuPaul recreated Vanessa Vanjie Mateo's exit on the season's tenth episode ("Social Media Kings Into Queens").

Bernardo Sim included Vanessa Vanjie Mateo's exit in Out's 2023 list of the 25 "most iconic and gag-worthy moments" in the show's history. He said she "established a new standard for how exit lines should be delivered when a queen is eliminated". Sim later included her "unforgettable" exit in the magazine's 2025 list of the "best and most hilarious" memes in the show's history. He described it as the "best, most impactful, and most memorable exit line of all time". Sim also included "Miss Vanjie" in Pride.com's 2023 list of the ten best Drag Race memes "that belong in the hall of fame". The Houston Chronicle's Joey Guerra said "Miss Vanjie" was among the show's "truly iconic" exits in 2025.

In 2018, Vanessa Vanjie Mateo released a song called "I'm Vanjie". Sam Damshenas described the song as a dance anthem and said Vanessa Vanjie Mateo references her exit from the show in the song as "legendary".

== Reception and recognition ==
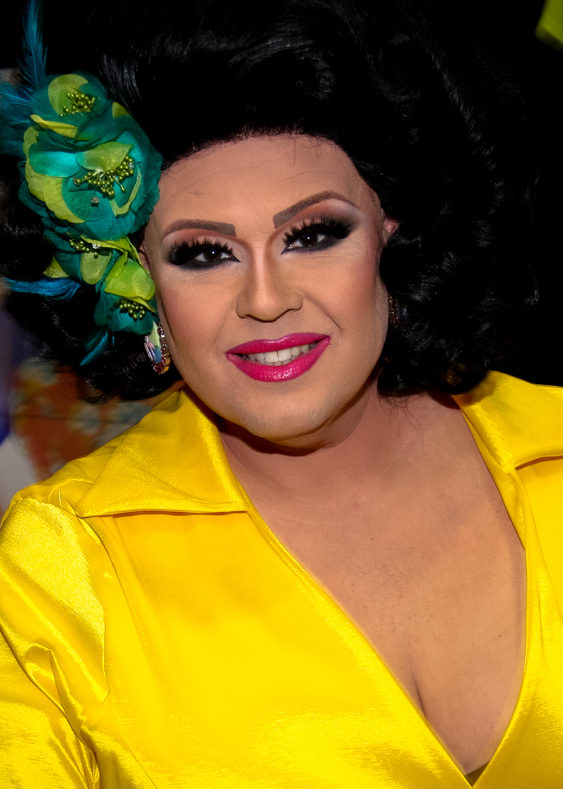
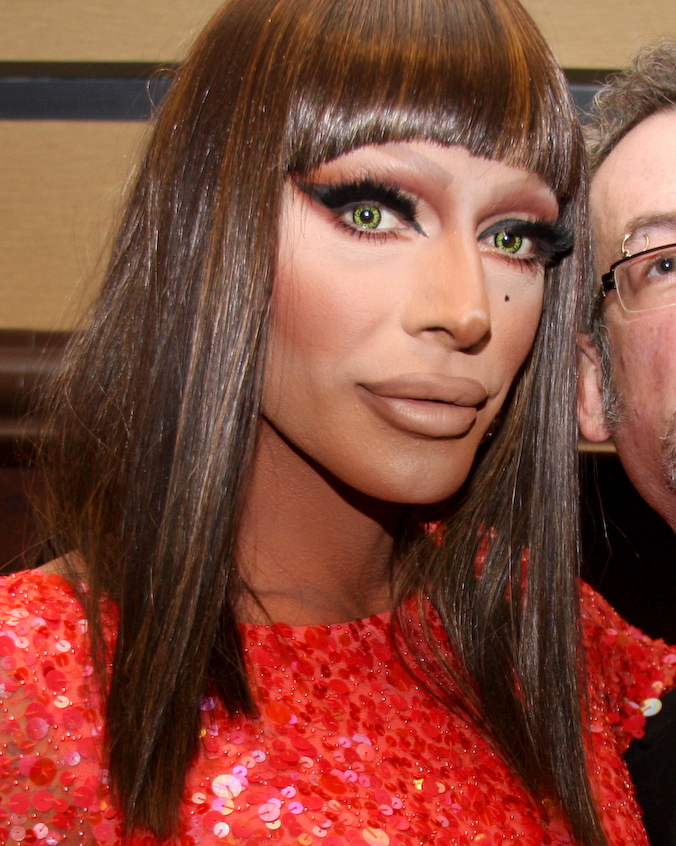
Hair stylist Delta Work (left, pictured at RuPaul's DragCon LA in 2017) and make-up artist Raven (right, pictured at the 23rd GLAAD Media Awards in 2012), both former Drag Race contestants, received Primetime Emmy Award nominations for their work on the episode.

Oliver Sava of The A.V. Club gave the episode a rating of 'A'. She described it as a "thrilling, hilarious premiere introducing an exciting lineup of new queens while honoring the show's past for this milestone season". John Paul Brammer of Them magazine said Kalorie Karbdashian-Williams "displayed formidable chops" and wrote of Vanessa Vanjie Mateo's elimination: "I don't think I've ever been so sad about the first queen to be eliminated. Her confessionals were genuinely hilarious, and I was looking forward to her screaming at us mere inches from our faces every Thursday." Sam Brooks of The Spinoff ranked the "Ain't No Other Man" performance number 116 in a 2019 "definitive ranking" of all 162 Drag Race lip-sync contests to date. In 2025, Out magazine's Bernardo Sim wrote, "It's fair to say that Kalorie did a slightly better job than Vanjie in that lip sync, and thank gawd for it — that loss led this queen to deliver her iconic 'Miss Vanjie' exit line that went viral immediately and entered the Drag Race herstory books."

The episode received three awards from seven nominations at the 70th Primetime Creative Arts Emmy Awards. Nick Murray won in the Outstanding Directing for a Reality Program category. American fashion designer Zaldy Goco won in the Outstanding Costumes for a Variety, Nonfiction, or Reality Programming category and Hector Pocasangre and Delta Work (Gabriel Villarreal) won in the Outstanding Hairstyling for a Variety, Nonfiction or Reality Program category. Director of photography Michael Jacob Kerber was nominated in the Outstanding Cinematography for a Reality Program category and editors Jamie Martin, Drew Forni, John Lim, and Michael Roha were nominated in the Outstanding Picture Editing for a Structured Reality or Competition Program category. Make-up artists Nicole Faulkner, Jen Fregozo, Natasha Marcelina, and Raven (David Petruschin) were nominated in the Outstanding Makeup for a Variety, Nonfiction or Reality Program category. Lousine Shamamian was nominated in the Outstanding Picture Editing for an Unstructured Reality Program category for the corresponding episode of Untucked.

== See also ==
- Christina Aguilera videography
