= Kalorie Karbdashian-Williams =

American drag performer

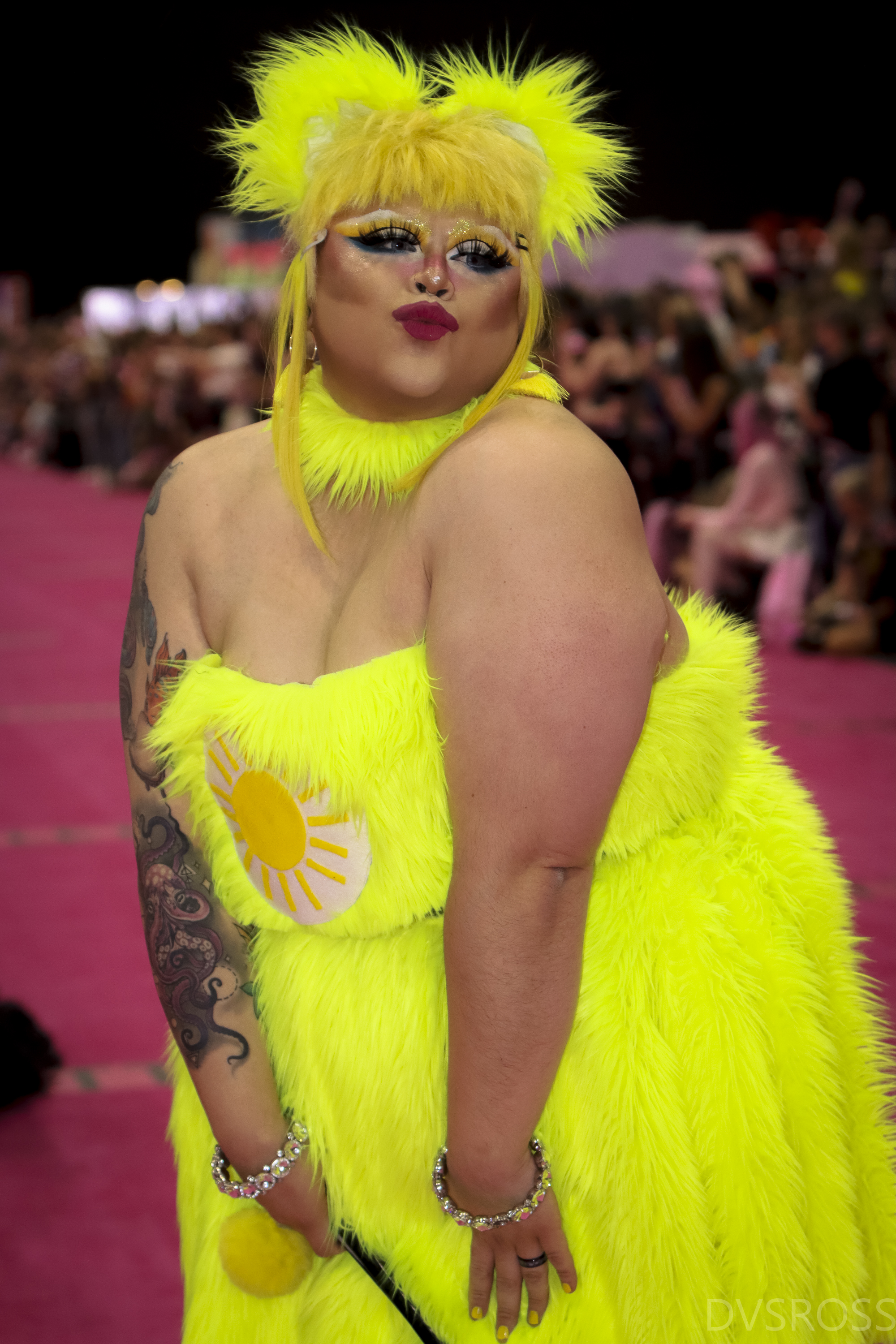
- Kalorie Karbdashian-Williams at RuPaul's DragCon LA, 2022
- Born: 1990 or 1991 (age 35–36); Roswell, New Mexico, U.S.
- Other name: Dani Hernandez
- Occupation: Drag queen
- Television: RuPaul's Drag Race (season 10)
- Website: kaloriekarbdashian.com

Kalorie Karbdashian-Williams (sometimes simply Kalorie Karbdashian) is the stage name of Dani Hernandez, an American drag performer who competed on season 10 of RuPaul's Drag Race. Born and raised in Roswell, New Mexico, Hernandez is based in Albuquerque.

== Early life and education ==
Dani Hernandez was born and raised in Roswell, New Mexico. She has said she was bullied in high school because of her weight, which reached as high as 340 pounds (150 kg).

== Career ==
Hernandez is a drag performer based in Albuquerque. She has said of her early experimentation with gender expression:

I started doing drag because I was kind of going through this identity crisis where I thought I wanted to be a woman. Then I started playing with makeup and I started to see that I could create a whole different face. From then I knew I didn't want to be a woman, but I just wanted to play with makeup.

Hernandez performed at the gay bar Albuquerque Social Club and was crowned Miss Duke City at the venue in 2016. She competed as Kalorie Karbdashian-Williams on season 10 (2018) of RuPaul's Drag Race and has continued to perform in drag shows. In 2018, Kalorie Karbdashian-Williams was part of the line-up for the annual 'Out in the Park' event at Six Flags Fiesta Texas. She is a resident performer at Effex Nightclub in Albuquerque, as of 2019.

=== RuPaul's Drag Race ===
Kalorie Karbdashian-Williams was the first contestant to represent New Mexico on Drag Race. On the premiere episode of the season ("10s Across the Board"), she placed in the bottom two of the main challenge and defeated Vanessa Vanjie Mateo in a lip-sync to "Ain't No Other Man" (2006) by Christina Aguilera. Kalorie Karbdashian-Williams was eliminated from the competition on the second episode ("PharmaRusical"), which featured a musical theatre challenge (or Rusical) inspired by pharmaceutical marketing. After being placed in the bottom two again, she lost a lip-sync battle against Eureka O'Hara to "Best of My Love" (1977) by The Emotions.

The Houston Chronicle's Joey Guerra said she "brought a gorgeous face and twerking skills". Dennis Hinzmann of Out magazine said Kalorie Karbdashian-Williams showed "curvy, body-positive looks". Paul Hagen of the LGBT magazine Metrosource wrote, "We especially got behind Kalorie's big-is-beautiful ethos, and her inspiring story of reshaping her life after reaching a weight well above 300 pounds in high school ... And we have rarely seen any contestant on Drag Race twerk on the runway with such vigor." In The Spinoff's 2019 "definitive ranking" of Drag Race lip-syncs to date, Sam Brooks ranked her battles against Vanessa Vanjie Mateo and Eureka O'Hara at 116 and 112 out of 162, respectively.

== Personal life ==
Hernandez came out as a transgender woman on November 20, 2026. On Drag Race, she recalled being bullied for her weight, not her sexual orientation.

Kalorie Karbdashian-Williams's name was inspired by Kim Kardashian and the Kardashian family.

== Filmography ==
=== Television ===
- RuPaul's Drag Race (season 10)
- RuPaul's Drag Race: Untucked (2018)

=== Web series ===
- Whatcha Packin'

== See also ==
- List of people from Albuquerque, New Mexico
