= Grand Finale (RuPaul's Drag Race season 9) =

- RuPaul's Drag Race episode
- Episode no.: Season 9 Episode 14
- Presented by: RuPaul
- Original air date: June 23, 2017
- Running time: 41 minutes

Episode chronology
← Previous "Reunited"	Next → "10s Across the Board"
- RuPaul's Drag Race season 9

"Grand Finale" is the fourteen episode of the ninth season of the American television series RuPaul's Drag Race. It originally aired on June 23, 2017. The episode sees the season's four finalists compete in a tournament of lip-sync contests for the win.

== Episode ==
The season's contestants return for the live grand finale. RuPaul then tells the final four contestants that they will be performing in a lip-sync tournament for the win. The first lip-sync contest is between Peppermint and Trinity Taylor, who perform to "Stronger" by Britney Spears. Peppermint wins the lip-sync and Trinity Taylor is eliminated from the competition. The second lip-sync contest is between Sasha Velour and Shea Couleé, who perform to "So Emotional" by Whitney Houston. Sasha Velour wins the lip-sync and Shea Couleé is eliminated from the competition. The final lip-sync contest is between Peppermint and Sasha Velour, who perform to "It's Not Right But It's Okay" (Thunderpuss Remix) by Houston. It is announced that Sasha Velour is the winner, making Peppermint the runner-up.

== Production and broadcast ==
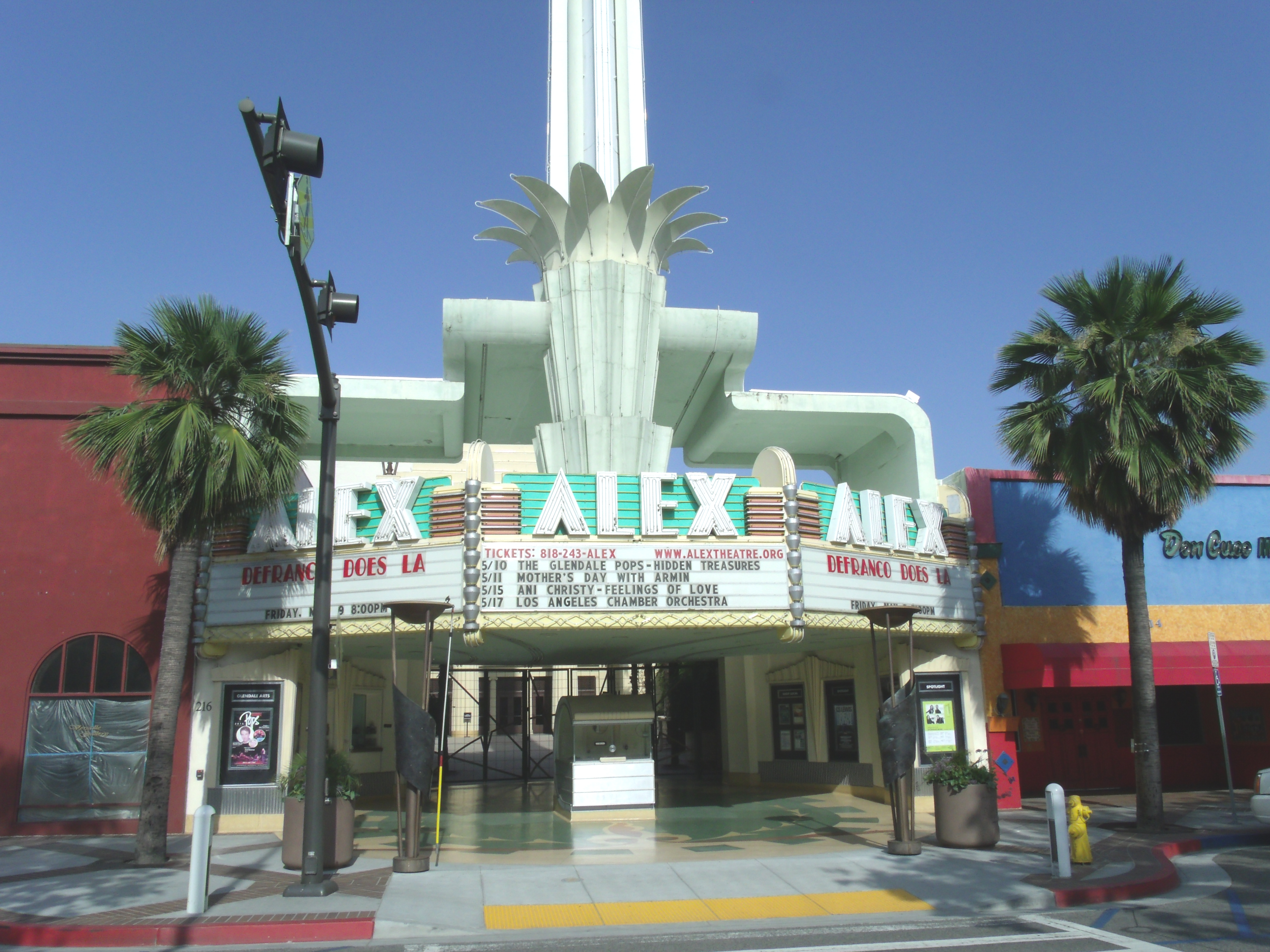
The episode was filmed at the Alex Theatre (exterior pictured in 2014) in Glendale, California.

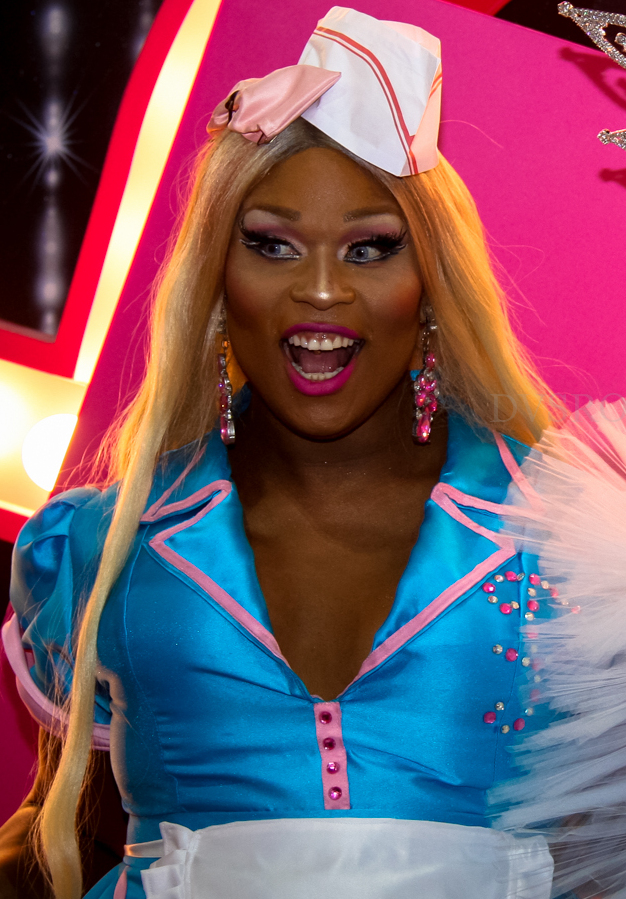
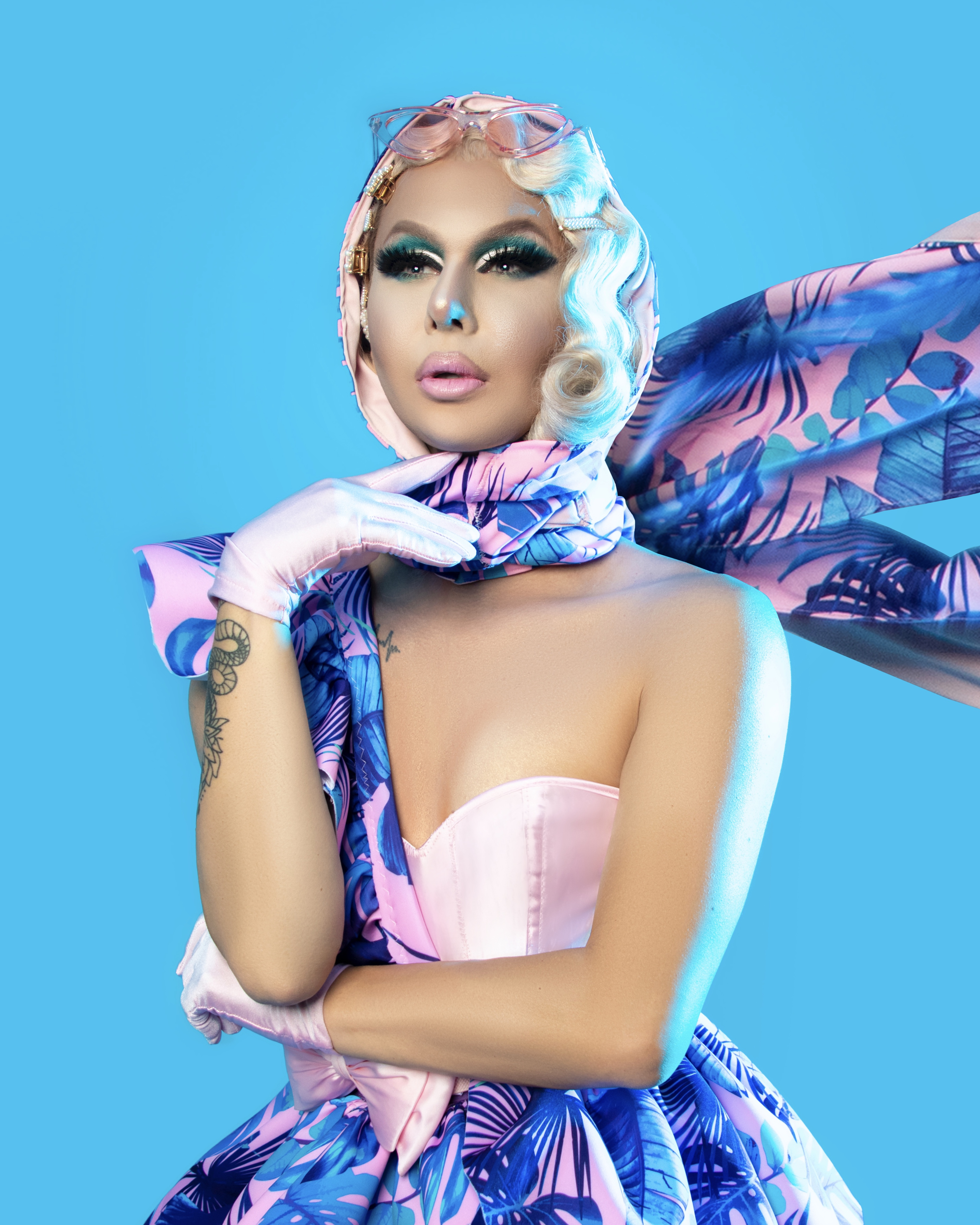
Peppermint (left) and Trinity Taylor (right) face off in a lip-sync contest to "Stronger" by Britney Spears.

The episode was filmed at the Alex Theater in Glendale, California, and originally aired on June 23, 2017. It included the show's first "smackdown for the crown" with four finalists. Peppermint has said she and Trinity Taylor had a plan to select each other as a competitor in the lip-sync tournament.

During "So Emotional", Sasha Velour wore a red outfit and a red wig, which was uncharacteristic for the often bald drag performer. She included a series of "rose petal reveals", according to Junkee. According to Nylon, "in a moment that has rightfully earned its spot in the Drag Race herstory books, the performance concluded with Sasha Velour lifting up her wavy red wig to reveal a sea of rose petals that cascaded to the ground right at the song’s climax." Teen Vogue said she "strategically poured out rose petals to add to the visuals of her performance". Sasha Velour has said the performance paid tribute to her late mother. She has also said of the performance:

I wanted an element to the performance with a ‘Wow’ factor. That was the challenge we had to rise to with almost no time to prepare. I ended up coming up with the idea the day before and bought tons and tons of flowers—fake rose petals from Michaels, actually. And the song is all about love in excess and I thought the explosion of rose petals really captured that. I practiced it once and made it work and was just glad it worked out.

=== Fashion ===
Sasha Velour wore a "cobalt gown with a corresponding Queen Elizabeth-esque ruff", as well as a "tearaway lace and pearl mask", according to Out magazine.

== Ratings and reception ==
The finale was the most watched in the show's history.

Oliver Sava of The A.V. Club gave the episode a rating of 'A'.

=== "So Emotional" lip-sync and legacy ===
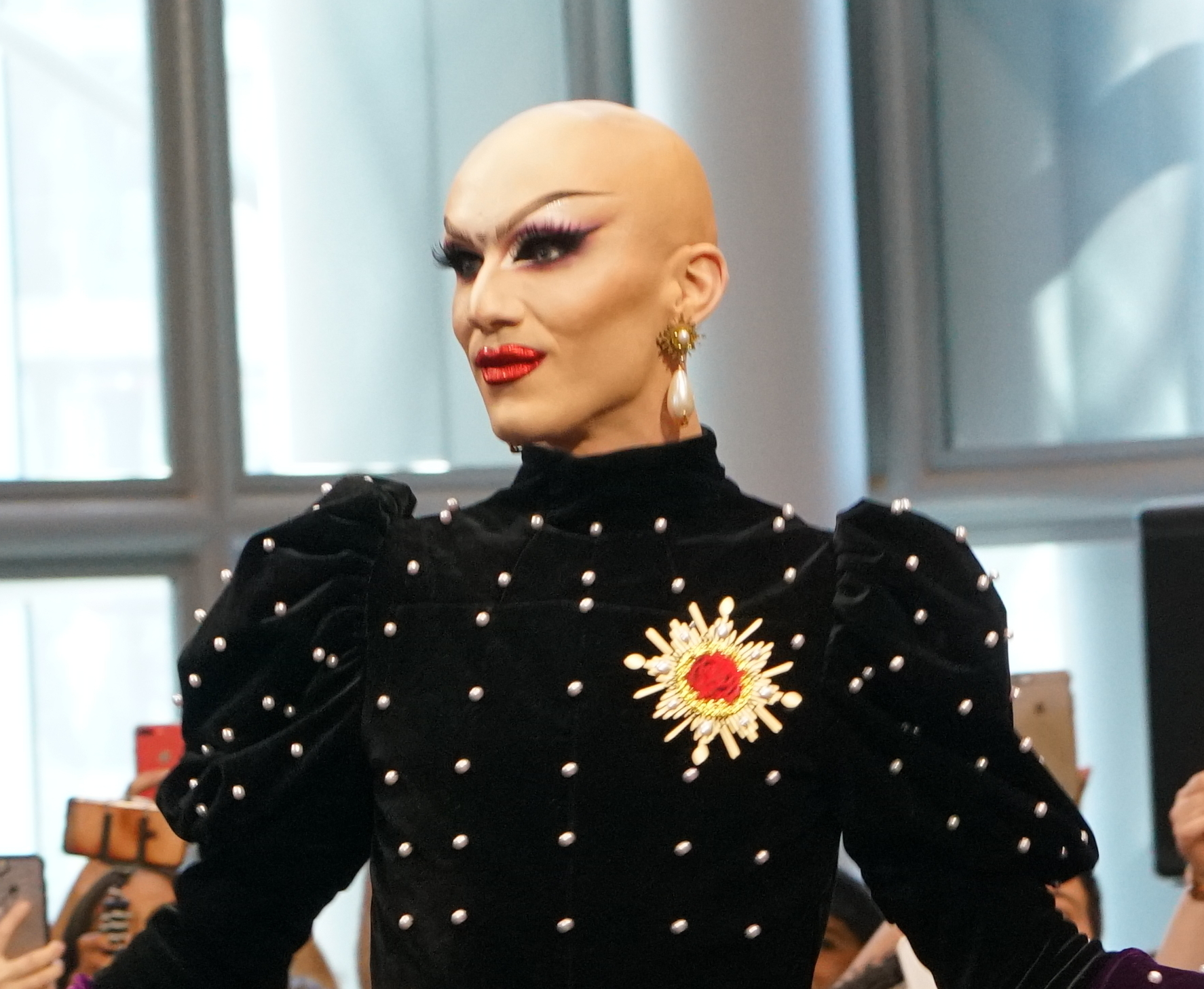
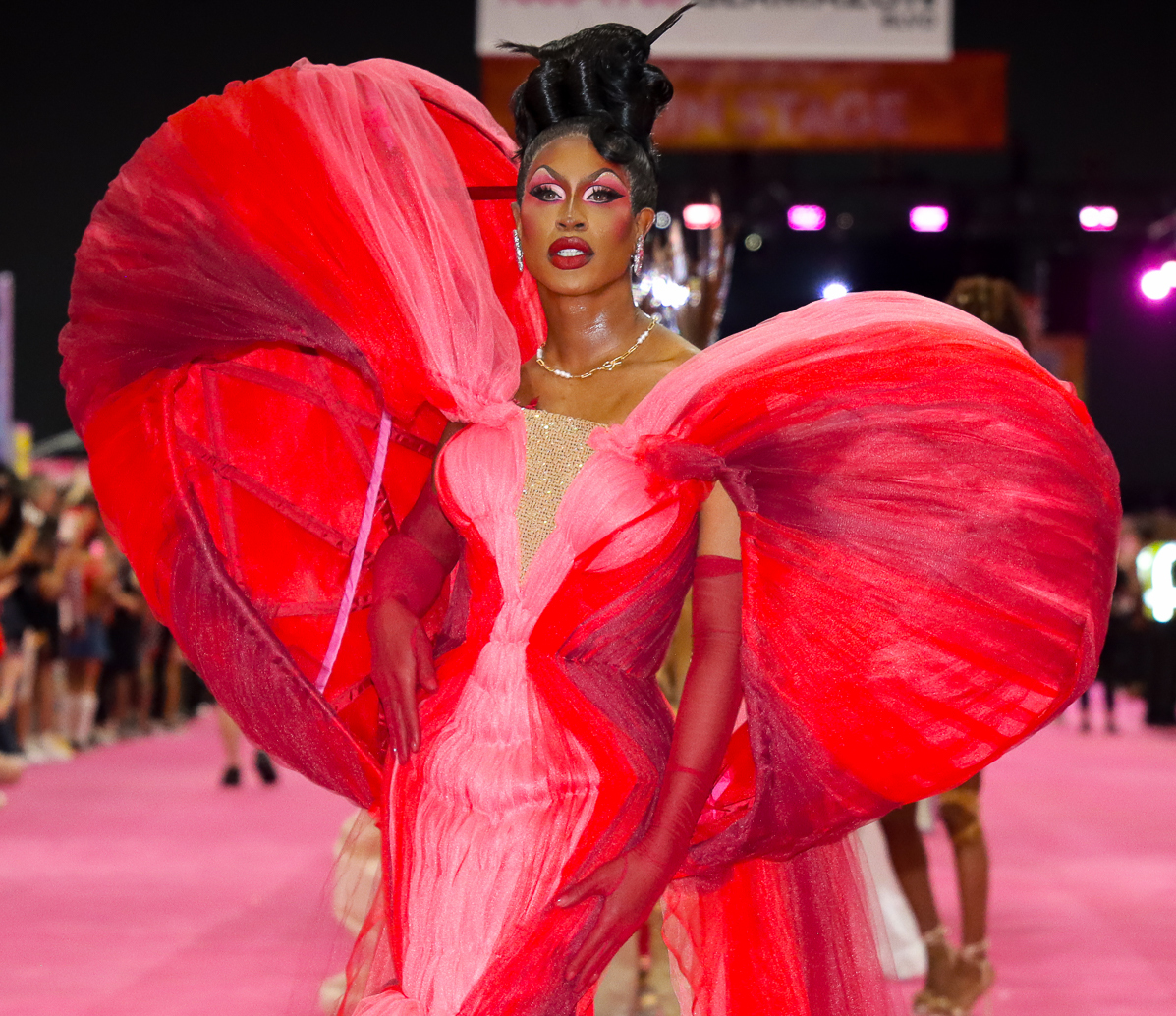
Sasha Velour (top) and Shea Couleé (bottom, pictured at RuPaul's DragCon LA in 2024) face off in a lip-sync contest to "So Emotional" by Whitney Houston.

"So Emotional" saw a 510 percent increase in streams across audio and video streaming services in the week ending on June 29, 2017, according to Nielsen Music. There was a 650 percent increase in Spotify streams. According to Bustle, the lip-sync contest "didn’t just guarantee her the crown. It became one of the most iconic and talked-about stunts in Drag Race herstory, with TIME magazine naming it among the top five TV episodes of 2017". Sasha Velour was nominated in the TV Musical Performance of the Year category for the performance at the 2018 Dorian Awards.

Sasha Velour reprised her "So Emotional" performance at Nightgowns, her show in New York City. Shea Couleé later referenced the lip-sync when she competed on the fifth season (2020) of RuPaul's Drag Race All Stars. For a challenge tasking the contestants with presenting "Prom Queen Fantasy" looks for a fashion show, she "paid homage to Stephen King’s horror novel Carrie – but with a Sasha-inspired twist", according to Gay Times. During the episode, Shea Couleé said, "I just wanted to base a look around a moment, where I thought I was going to be queen of the prom. And it didn’t turn out like that for me. For the next year at meet and greets, fans would take off their hats and rose petals would fall out because I was the butt of this joke. I wanted to find an opportunity to reclaim my rose... I was really devastated, I’m not going to lie, and it took me being surrounded with people who love me and kept me inspired and pushed me to keep going. Those are the very people responsible for me standing here right now."

In 2022, Raffy Ermac of Out wrote, "the lasting impression Sasha ... and her rose petals left on the Drag Race world is still felt to this day, with the stunt forever changing the game when it comes to reveals on Drag Race". The magazine's Bernardo Sim called the rose petal reveals "iconic" in 2025. Screen Rant included her performance in a 2022 list of the show's best lip-syncs. In 2023, Mathew Rodriguez of Them wrote, "Many Sasha Velour fans point to her 'So Emotional' lip sync in the ... season 9 finale as a moment that will live on forever. It changed the trajectory of the show, and of her career, forever." Stephen Daw selected the "So Emotional" performance for the ninth season in Billboard's 2024 list of the show's best lip-sync contests from each season. Daw wrote:

It’s fitting that, after making it through an entire season without lip syncing, Sasha Velour would show off like this. Everything about her performance here is magnetic — even when she’s not shaking rose petals out of her wig and gloves, Sasha is communicating every iota of emotion her body can hold through her face. There's no denying that Shea performed the hell out of 'So Emotional,' but she was dancing on Sasha's stage; after all, Ms. Velour owned that number.
