= Cloo =

Defunct American cable channel

- Country: United States
- Broadcast area: Nationwide

Programming
- Language: English
- Picture format: 480i (SDTV)

Ownership
- Owner: NBCUniversal
- Parent: NBCUniversal Cable

History
- Launched: January 1, 2006; 20 years ago
- Replaced: Trio
- Closed: February 1, 2017; 9 years ago
- Former names: Sleuth (2006–2011)

Cloo, formerly known as Sleuth, was an American pay television channel owned and operated by NBCUniversal which aired programming originally dedicated to the crime and mystery genres, though in its later years it occasionally aired series and films unrelated to these genres, and was used as an example of channel drift and superfluous channel bundling, presenting series easily found through other venues. The channel launched on January 1, 2006, replacing Trio, and closed on February 1, 2017.

As of February 2015, approximately 25,495,000 American households (21.9% of households with television) received Cloo, though this declined with later removals by several cable services as carriage agreements expired.

== History ==
Logo at launch as Sleuth

Cloo focused on mystery entertainment, with the majority of the channel's programming sourced from fellow Comcast networks such as NBC and USA Network. By 2016, the network's schedule was made up mostly of repeats of USA Network series, and marathons of acquired series from the Law and Order, NCIS, and CSI franchises, along with the original MacGyver and House. Films from the NBCUniversal library or acquired as part of USA Network's film rights purchases were also part of the schedule, meaning films having nothing to do with crimes or mysteries, such as Enchanted, The 40 Year-Old Virgin and Bee Movie aired on the network.

On August 15, 2011, Sleuth was renamed as Cloo in order for NBCU to be able to trademark and own the name, as the word "clue" itself is too common a name to be trademark-able and the commonness of both "sleuth" and "clue" would not work for search engine optimization. In addition, the different spelling averted any confusion with Hasbro's board game Clue.

=== Carriage decline and closure ===
On August 10, 2013, Cloo was removed by Dish Network, which cited that most of the network's rerun-centric programming was duplicative of that available on other networks and streaming services. A year later on August 18, 2014, it was removed from Verizon FIOS for the same reason.

Charter Communications (Spectrum, Bright House Networks and Time Warner Cable) removed the channel with its services in January 2017, as with Esquire Network (another Comcast/NBCU network which was closed on June 28, 2017), when it refused to continue their carriage of Cloo within their new carriage agreements with NBCUniversal, removing around 2/3 of the network's homes and reducing to 8.5 million households. NBCU already had been looking to remove extraneous channels without original programming since the summer of 2016, criteria which Cloo, Chiller, and Esquire fell into. In the end, however, industry media had little to no notice of the closure, and only cable providers learned of its closure in advance on January 31 as of 5:59 a.m. ET from Comcast, due to the limited amount of time between Charter's settlement of their new NBCUniversal carriage agreement and the channel's sudden closure. Because the channel was effectively automated with little to no promotions to maintain, no employees were affected by the channel's closure.

On February 1, 2017, its social media presences were removed, and the website redirected to the USA Network site without any notice. The network's last broadcast day consisted of a full-series marathon of Syfy's Continuum. Following the end credits of the last episode, a slide was shown, with the Cloo logo and the words "GOOD NIGHT!" underneath, along with "Thank you for watching Cloo", the NBCUniversal logo, and the name of the satellite that provided Cloo's broadcast (AMC 10, Transponder 7) in between two NBC logos, along with the common NBC off-air audio test using the network's trademark chimes. Shortly after Cloo's shutdown, NBCUniversal announced that the female-focused network Oxygen would be refocused as a true crime channel to fill a void left by Cloo's closure, which occurred several months later.

== Programming ==
On September 17, 2011, Cloo premiered two original series, both of which were cancelled after their first seasons.

- Dateline on Cloo, featuring repurposed Dateline NBC episodes focused on true-crime stories.
- Killer Instinct, a 13-part true-crime series featuring criminal profiler Mark Safarik.

The channel originally featured crime and mystery programming from NBCUniversal's extensive library of feature films, classic television shows, reality series and documentaries. Programming initially included popular and cult television series such as Simon & Simon, Miami Vice, The A-Team, Dragnet (1967–70 version), Emergency!, Adam-12, Knight Rider, The Equalizer, Homicide: Life on the Street, JAG, Profiler, Magnum, P.I., The Rockford Files, The Burning Zone and more recent canceled series such as EZ Streets, Karen Sisco, Deadline, Conviction, and Medical Investigation. Much of this older programming eventually migrated to sister digital subchannel network Cozi TV.

As Sleuth, it also aired mystery and suspense films such as Scarface, The Jackal, Casino, Sneakers and Mercury Rising.

On February 25, 2007, the channel aired a fourteen-hour movie marathon entitled "Chiller On Sleuth" to promote the launch of Chiller, a sister horror and suspense programming that launched four days later on March 1; The movies that aired during this marathon are Wait Until Dark, Psycho, I Saw What You Did (1988 remake), and The Island. Also, before this, on February 23 and 24, 2007, a preview of Chiller aired on The 101 Network (which was at channel 101 on DirecTV).

In January 2009, all shows from the lineup were removed and replaced with mainly NBCUniversal-produced, USA Network original shows, Monk and In Plain Sight to its lineup, running marathons of each program's episodes. NCIS was added to the channel's lineup, as well as two Canadian series, Da Vinci's Inquest and Cold Squad, which were barter syndication series which were mainly prevalent on low-tier local television stations and digital subchannel networks such as Retro TV. The Law & Order franchise also joined the channel. It also aired another Canadian series, The Eleventh Hour. It aired instead as Bury the Lead, to avoid confusion with Eleventh Hour, a 2008 CBS series based on a British series unrelated to the Canadian concept.

Besides the above-mentioned series and franchises, various other series aired from the NBCUniversal library with rights through USA Network aired on Cloo, along with Walker, Texas Ranger before its rights to broadcast were expired in 2015, and moved to Grit and INSP. In September 2014, the rights to COPS previously held by now-defunct sister network G4 moved to Cloo until Spike (now Paramount Network) became sole owner of the cable syndication rights of COPS (which aired new episodes following its 2013 Fox cancellation) in early 2016.

== See also ==
- Cozi TV, where much of the network's older programming has migrated to.
- Trio, predecessor to Sleuth/Cloo
