= EGG, the Arts Show =

American nonfiction television program

- Narrated by: Elaine Stritch
- Country of origin: United States
- Original language: English
- No. of seasons: 4

Original release
- Network: PBS
- Release: January 13, 2000 – April 8, 2005

EGG, the arts show is an American nonfiction television program that aired on PBS from January 13, 2000 to April 8, 2005. EGG documented both the famous and the unusual aspects and projects of classical and modern arts; its narrator was Elaine Stritch.

Produced by Thirteen/WNET New York, Jeff Folmsbee served as Executive Producer. Mark Mannucci was series producer. EGG won a Peabody Award in 2002. Trio has aired the series in reruns.
