= PharmaRusical =

- RuPaul's Drag Race episode
- Episode no.: Season 10; Episode 2
- Original air date: March 29, 2018

Guest appearances
- Halsey (guest judge); Padma Lakshmi (guest judge); Andy Cohen; Alyssa Edwards

Episode chronology
← Previous "10s Across the Board"	Next → "Tap That App"
- RuPaul's Drag Race season 10

"PharmaRusical" is the second episode of the tenth season of the American reality competition television series RuPaul's Drag Race, which aired on VH1 on March 29, 2018. Halsey and Padma Lakshmi are guest judges. Andy Cohen and Alyssa Edwards also make guest appearances.

The episode's main challenge has contestants perform in a Rusical (musical theatre challenge) about fictional pharmaceuticals. The Vixen wins the main challenge. Kalorie Karbdashian-Williams is eliminated from the competition after placing in the bottom two and losing a lip-sync contest against Eureka.

== Episode ==
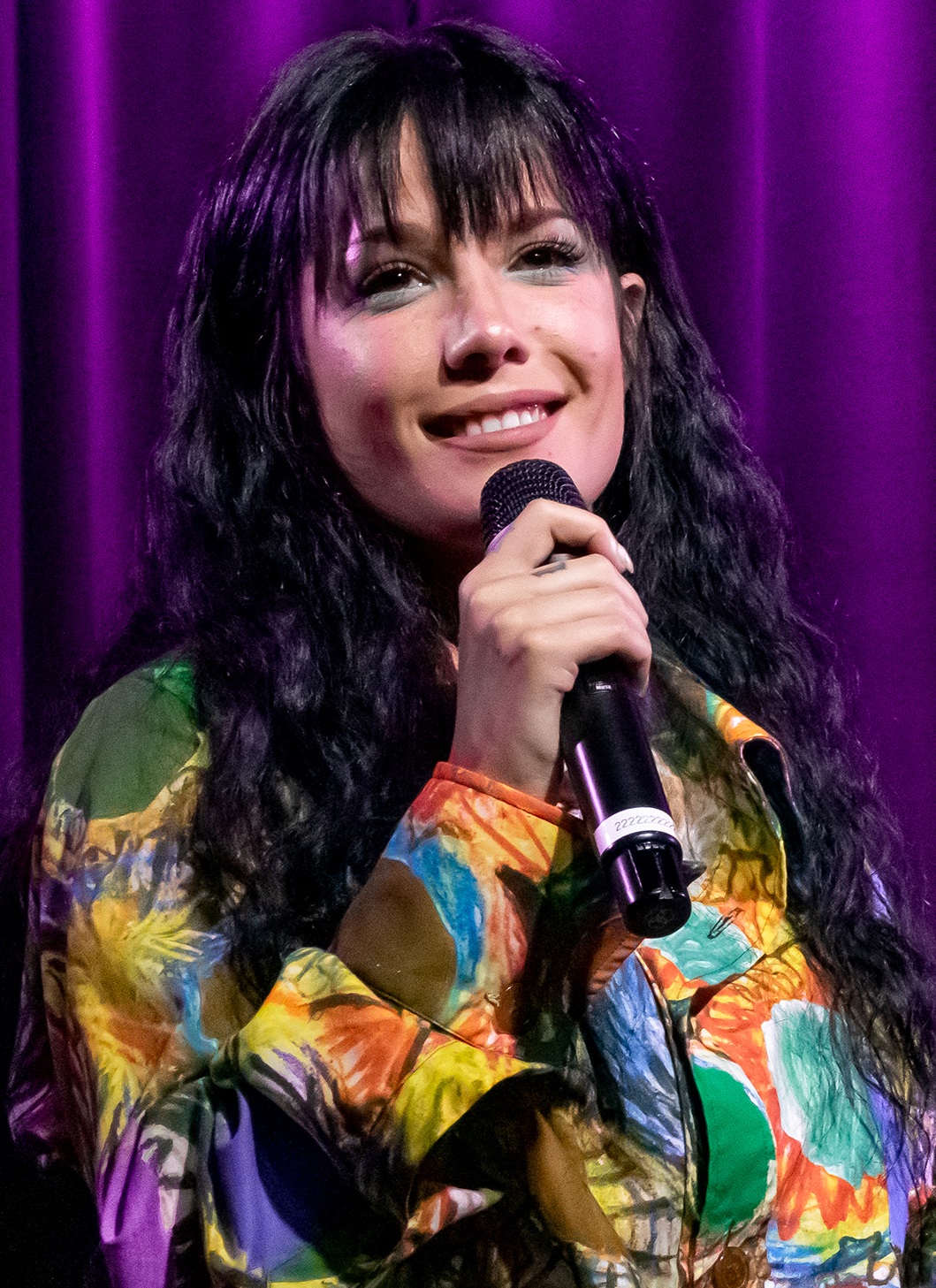
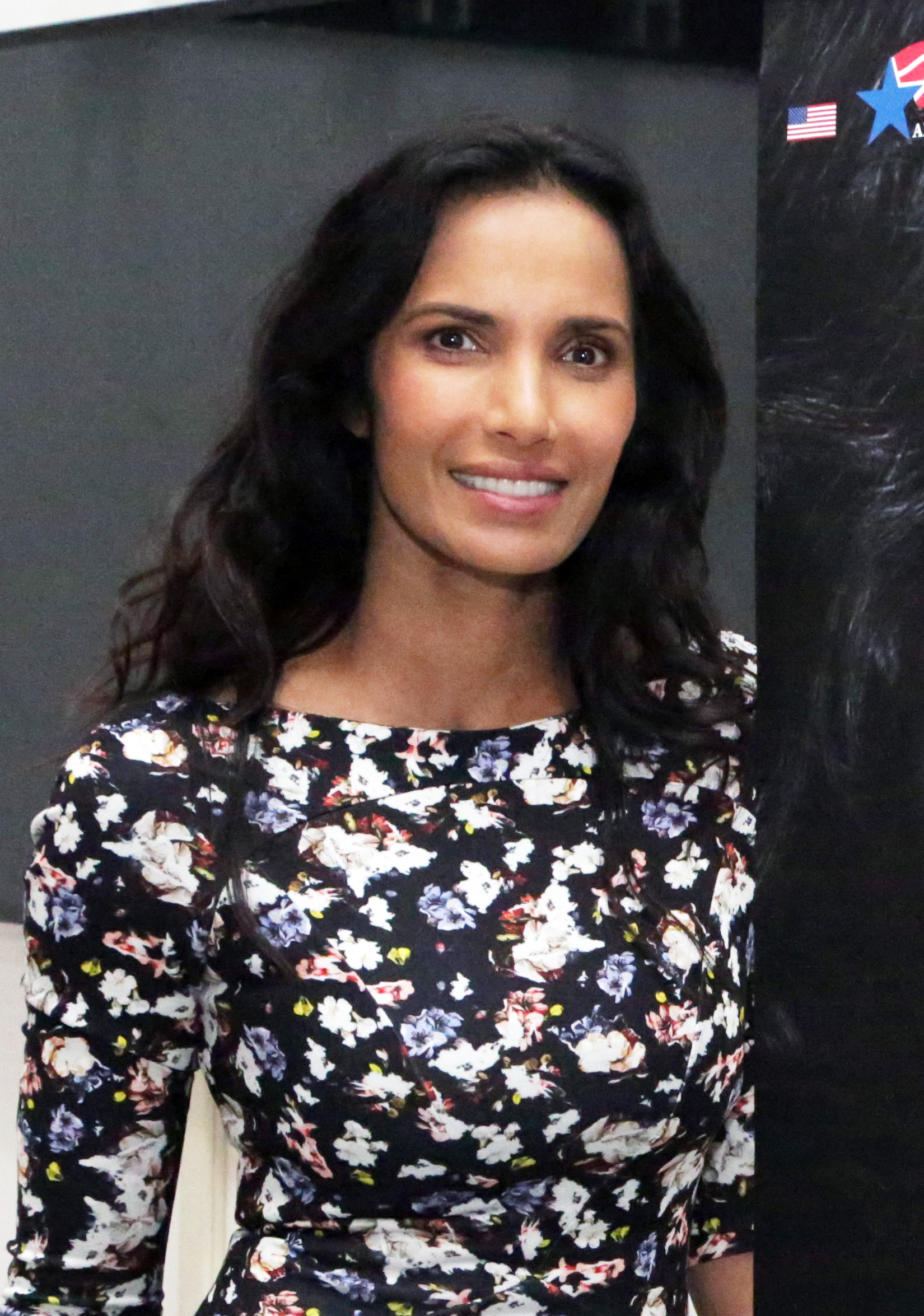
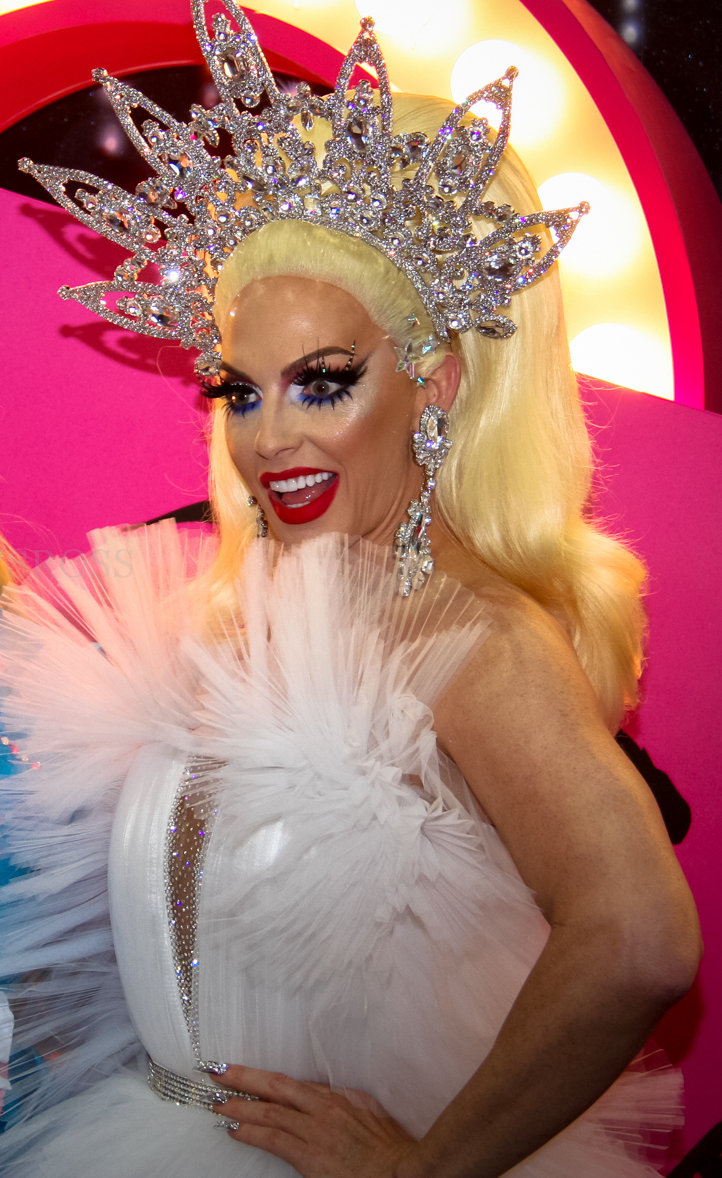
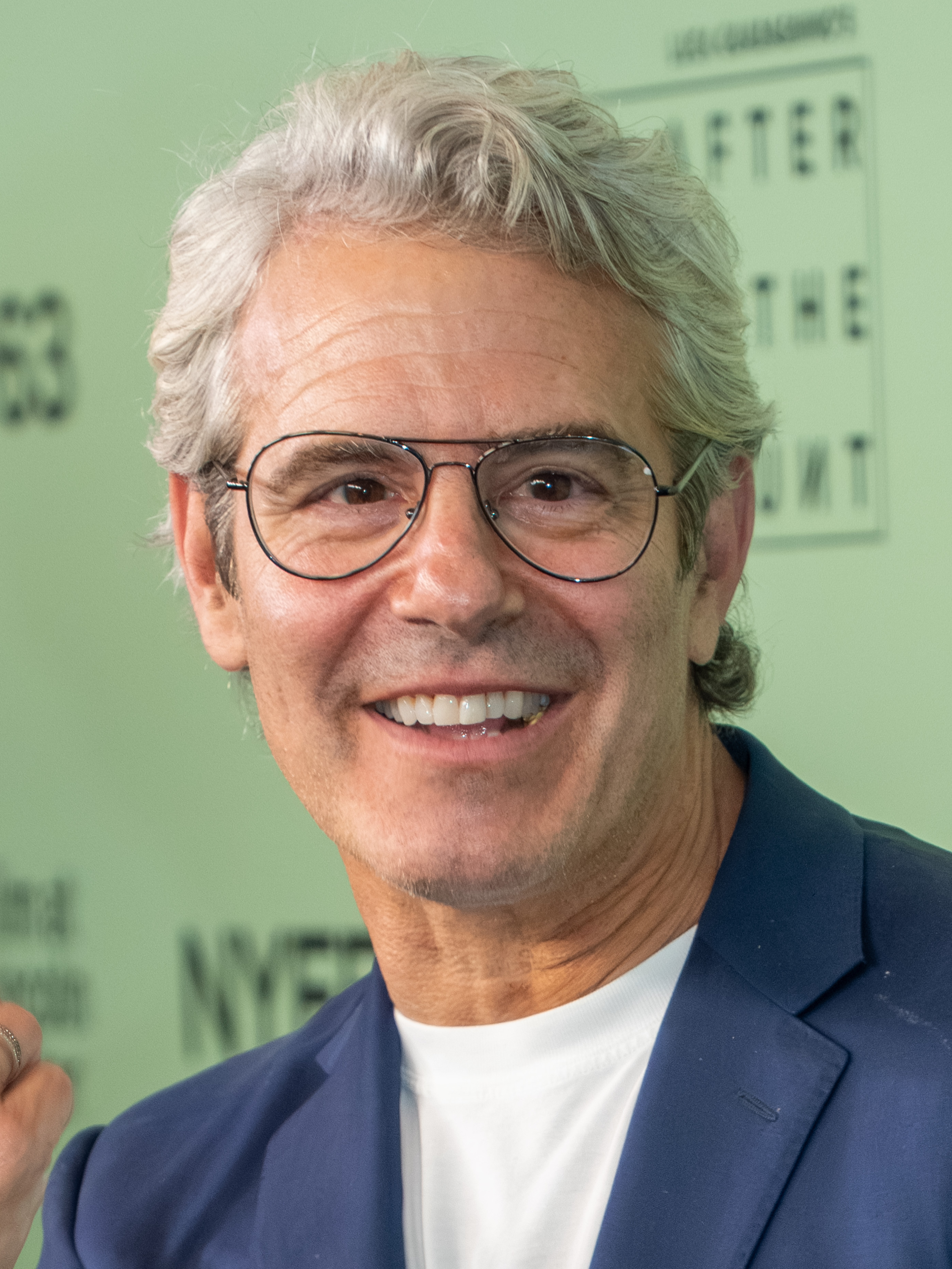
Halsey (top left, pictured in 2019) and Padma Lakshmi (top right, pictured in 2017) are guest judges. Alyssa Edwards (bottom left, pictured at RuPaul's DragCon LA in 2019) and Andy Cohen (bottom right, pictured in 2025) also makes guest appearances.

The contestants return to the Werk Room after Vanessa Vanjie Mateo's elimination. On a new day, RuPaul and guest Andy Cohen greet the contestants and reveal the mini-challenge "Hay Girl Hay", which tasks contestants with getting into "quick drag" and dancing to country music. Asia O'Hara and The Vixen are declared the winners of the mini-challenge. RuPaul reveals the main challenge, which tasks contestants with performing in a Rusical (musical theatre challenge) called PharmaRusical. Asia O'Hara and The Vixen are the team captains, as the winners of the mini-challenge. The captains select their team members.

Back in the Werk Room, the contestants assign roles and start to prepare for the Rusical. RuPaul meets with each team to ask questions and offer advice. On the main stage, the contestants rehearse choreography with former competitor Alyssa Edwards. In the Werk Room, the contestants start to prepare for the musical and the fashion show. Eureka struggles with her self-confidence. Kalorie Karbdashian-Williams shares about her experience being heavier.

On the main stage, RuPaul welcomes fellow judges Michelle Visage and Ross Mathews, as well as guest judges Halsey and Padma Lakshmi. The contestants present the Rusical, followed by the fashion show. The judges deliver their critiques and deliberate. The Vixen is declared the winner of the main challenge. Eureka and Kalorie Karbdashian-Williams place in the bottom two and face off in a lip-sync contest to "Best of My Love" (1977) by The Emotions. Eureka wins the lip-sync and Kalorie Karbdashian-Williams is eliminated from the competition.

== Production ==
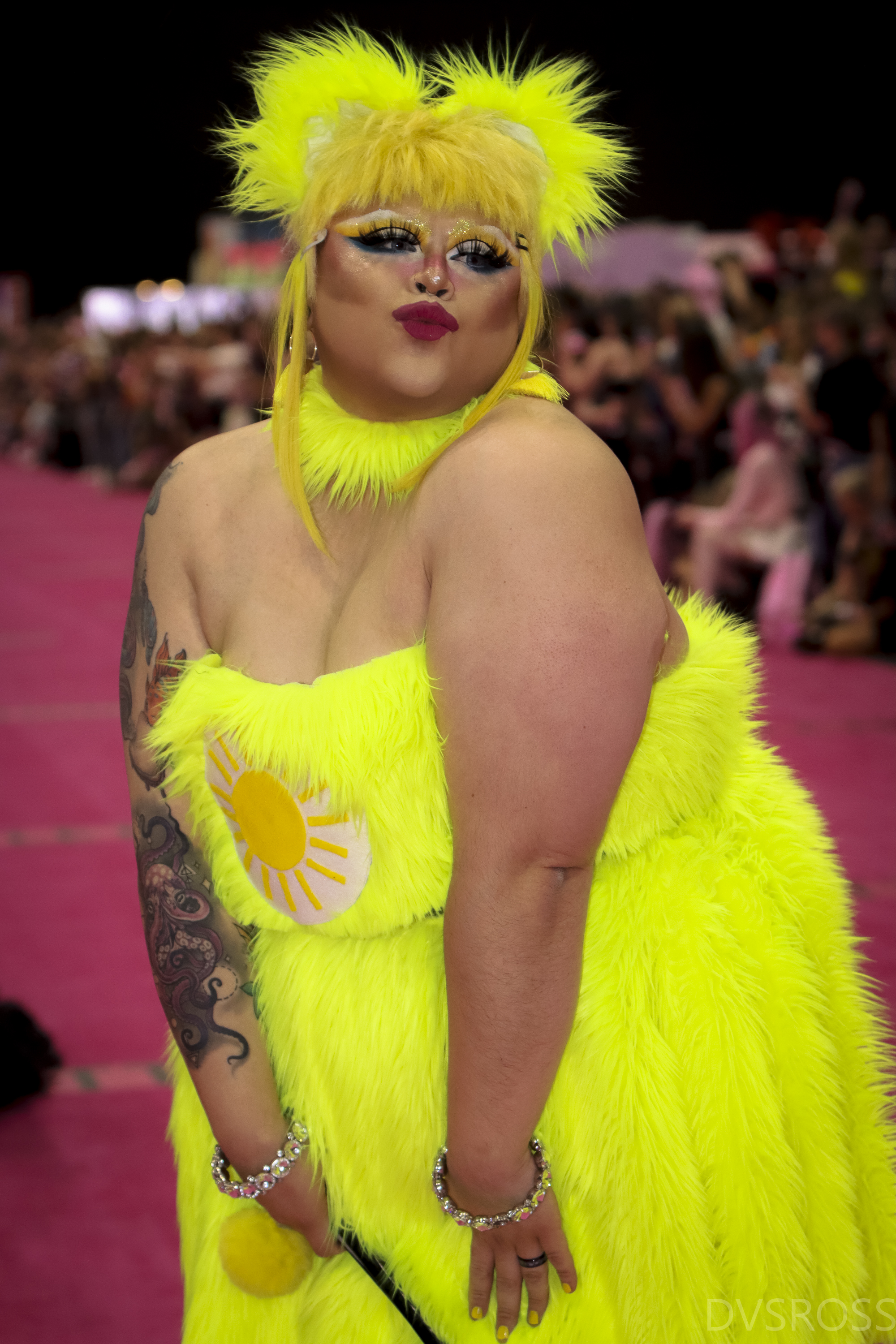
Kalorie Karbdashian-Williams (pictured in 2022) is eliminated from the competition.

The episode originally aired on March 29, 2018. Among fictional prescription drugs mentioned in the Rusical are Badonkadonx, Conflama, and Flaccida.

=== Fashion ===
For the fashion show, the category is "Very Best Drag". Asia O'Hara wears a stoned pink dress. Yuhua Hamasaki's outfit is blue. Dusty Ray Bottoms wears a black-and-white outfit and a blonde wig. Monique Heart's outfit reveals into another and she has large eyes as a headpiece. Kalorie Karbdashian-Williams wears a black outfit and gloves. Eureka's catsuit has many rhinestones and sequins. Aquaria wears two rings in her nose. Her outfit is black and she has a green boa and green earrings. The Vixen wears a flame-inspired orange-and-red outfit. Miz Cracker has a gold outfit and square-shaped hair. Mayhem Miller wears a light blue dress with tulle. Blair St. Clair's wears a pageant gown and a blonde wig. Kameron Michaels has a colorful outfit with many butterflies attached. Monét X Change wears a stoned catsuit.

== Reception ==
Bowen Yang and Matt Rogers of Vulture rated the episode 5 out of 5 stars. Metro Weekly's Rhuaridh Marr called the musical number "dreadful". Bernardo Sim of Out magazine said PharmaRusical "is arguably one of the weirdest Rusicals in the history of the series". Similarly, Allison Shoemaker of Consequence said the episode "might feature the single strangest premise for a challenge in Drag Race herstory". Roby Abraham of Wussy Magazine, opined, "This had to be the most lackluster episode of the franchise in the last few years. From the mini challenge to the challenge and even the runway. It was just kinda….." Kyle Munzenrieder of W magazine said the Rusical had "some cute moments".

Charlie Duncan of PinkNews called the Rusical "not good" in 2024. PharmaRusical ranked number 17 in IN Magazine's 2024 "definitive ranking" of the musicals on the show to date and said: "PharmaRusical included a big cast as it was only in the second episode of season 10. The dancing was ambitious but the actual musical lacked any substance, and a storyline. It jumped back and forth between different made up prescription drugs, and to be perfectly honest, we're still a little confused as to why this was chosen as the season 10 Rusical." Stephen Daw ranked "PharmaRusical" sixteenth in Billboard's 2025 list of Rusicals to date. He said, "It's sort of funny, but ultimately very strange and random", as well as "It's tough to remember a single performance from such a strange Rusical". He also wrote, "The songs of this Rusical are disjointed, skipping around frequently from hip-hop to Broadway to pop at a frenzied pace. There's not a lot to say here – there's very little that's actually successful in this music... PharmaRusical was a forgettable experience, and one that you certainly don't need to think too much about. If you're looking to rewatch old episodes, feel free to skip this."
