= EZ Streets =

- DVD cover
- Genre: Drama
- Created by: Paul Haggis
- Starring: Ken Olin; Joe Pantoliano; Jason Gedrick; Sarah Trigger; Richard Portnow
- Composer: Mark Isham
- Country of origin: United States
- Original language: English
- No. of seasons: 1
- No. of episodes: 9 (1 unaired)

Production
- Executive producer: Paul Haggis
- Camera setup: Single-camera
- Running time: 60 minutes
- Production companies: Paul Haggis Productions; Universal Television

Original release
- Network: CBS
- Release: October 27, 1996 – April 2, 1997

EZ Streets is an American crime drama television series created by Paul Haggis. It premiered on CBS on October 27, 1996, with a two-hour pilot television film and ended on April 2, 1997. The series stars Ken Olin, Joe Pantoliano, and Jason Gedrick.

== Synopsis ==
The series is set in a decaying American city located near the Canada–US border, and deals with the interconnected lives of the city's criminals, politicians, and police officers. The primary characters were three different men from various backgrounds trying to survive in the nameless bombed-out inner city.

Cameron Quinn was a police detective who had just joined the intelligence division to clear his name after being categorized as a "dirty cop" after his partner was killed in a drug sting gone wrong. Quinn then worked undercover for Captain Geary by infiltrating the local criminal underworld. Quinn's prime target (and the thug who murdered his partner) was Jimmy Murtha, an extremely violent hoodlum who was determined to rise in the ranks of the local Mob. Murtha was often helped by his sexy, but unscrupulous attorney, Theresa Connors. She was adept at using every legal loophole and ploy to keep Murtha out of jail. Murtha's primary competition was the mobster who ran the businesses in the other half of the city, Michael "Fivers" Dugan.

It appeared that everyone in the city counsel, even the proud mayor Christian Davidson, were under the thumb of Fivers Dugan. Mayor Davidson was doing business with Dugan to try to re-build the decaying and crime-ridden community for political contributions. Murtha, despite his ruthless nature and frequent evil dealings, had one positive goal: to save his neighborhood from being overrun with drugs, crime and local teen gangs.

Danny Rooney was a mutual childhood friend of Murtha who had just gotten released from prison after serving three years for taking the rap in an armed robbery that one of Murtha's thugs committed. Despite his desire to go straight, Rooney was forced to go to work for Murtha in performing various illegal jobs. Rooney hoped that the dirty money he earned would help him get back together with his estranged, drug-addicted wife Elli, and their young daughter Janie.

== Characters ==
- Ken Olin as Detective Cameron Quinn
- Joe Pantoliano as Jimmy Murtha
- Jason Gedrick as Danny Rooney
- R. D. Call as Michael "Fivers" Dugan
- John Finn as Captain Geary
- Debrah Farentino as Theresa Conners
- Richard Portnow as Detective Frank Collero
- Carl Lumbly as Mayor Christian Davidson
- Sarah Trigger as Elli Rooney - Danny's estranged wife
- Andrew Divoff as Andre "Frenchie" Desormeaux
- Mike Starr as Mickey Kinnear
- Robert Spillane as Bobby
- Rosemary Murphy as Christina Quinn - Cameron's mother
- Saverio Guerra as Sammy Feathers
- Courtney Jacquin as Janie Rooney - Danny and Elli's daughter
- Andrew Rothenberg as Shirt
- John St. Ryan as Bo
- Gregg Henry as Councilman Eeling (1997)
- Jack McGee as Leo (1997)
- Louis Lombardi as The Fat Man (1997)

== Reception and cancellation ==
After its first episode in its regular timeslot on Wednesday, October 30, 1996, it was put on hiatus with CBS president Leslie Moonves promising that the show would be "relaunched" at a later date. The series was relaunched that spring from March 1, 1997, to April 2, 1997, but failed to garner a substantial audience. CBS canceled EZ Streets in April 1997 due to low ratings. The last episode, "Neither Have I Wings to Fly", never aired on CBS, although it was broadcast once in Canada. Critics criticized Moonves for not reairing the pilot and first series episode before the relaunch.

== Episodes ==
No.	Title	Directed by	Written by	Original release date	Prod. code	Viewers (millions)
1	"Pilot"	Paul Haggis	Paul Haggis	October 27, 1996	83593	10.7
2	"Every Picture Tells a Story"	Ken Olin	Story by : Paul Haggis & David Black; Teleplay by : Paul Haggis	October 30, 1996	K1601	6.6
3	"A Terrible Beauty"	George Bloomfield	Paul Haggis & Robert Moresco	March 3, 1997	K1602	10.66
4	"St. Jude Took a Bullet"	James Quinn	Story by : Paul Haggis & David Black; Teleplay by : Paul Haggis	March 5, 1997	K1603	9.29
5	"Every Dog Has Its Day"	Donna Deitch	Story by : Paul Haggis & David Black; Teleplay by : Paul Haggis	March 12, 1997	K1604	7.33
6	"One Acquainted with the Night"	Antina W. Addison	Paul Haggis & Robert Moresco	March 19, 1997	K1605	6.78
7	"On the Left Side of the Angel"	Peter Markle	Paul Haggis & Patrick Harbinson	March 26, 1997	K1607	7.90
8	"A Ceremony of Innocence"	Michael Fields	Paul Haggis & Mark Saraceni	April 2, 1997	K1608	5.88
9	"Neither Have I Wings to Fly"	Randall Zisk	Story by : Paul Haggis & Kimberly Hill; Teleplay by : Kimberly Hill & Jeff King	Unaired	K1609	N/A

== Production ==
Each episode of the series reportedly cost $1.6 million to produce.

== Syndication ==
In 2006, repeats of the series began airing on the new U.S. cable channel, Sleuth. All episodes, including the one not shown on CBS, were aired.

== Home media ==
On May 23, 2006, Universal Studios released the 2-hour pilot episode and the episodes "Every Dog Has Its Day" and "One Acquainted with the Night" on a single DVD as part of its Brilliant But Cancelled series.

== Awards and nominations ==
Year	Award	Category	Recipient	Result
1997	Casting Society of America's Artios Award	Best Casting for TV, Dramatic Pilot	Nan Dutton and Jane Alderman	Won
1997	Online Film & Television Association Award	Best New Drama Series		Won
1997	Online Film & Television Association Award	Best New Theme Song in a Series	Mark Isham	Nominated
1997	Primetime Emmy Award	Outstanding Main Title Theme Music	Mark Isham	Won
1997	Television Critics Association Award	Program of the Year		Won
1997	Television Critics Association Award	Outstanding Achievement in Drama		Nominated
1997	Television Critics Association Award	Individual Achievement in Drama	Joe Pantoliano	Nominated
1997	Viewers for Quality Television Award	Best Supporting Actor in a Quality Drama Series	Joe Pantoliano	Nominated
1997	Viewers for Quality Television Award	Best Supporting Actor in a Quality Drama Series	Jason Gedrick	Nominated
1997	Viewers for Quality Television Award	Founder's Award	Paul Haggis	Won
1998	Young Artist Award	Best Performance in a TV Drama Series - Guest Starring Young Actress	Courtney Jacquin	Nominated
