= The N-Word (film) =

2004 film by Todd Larkins Williams

- DVD cover
- Directed by: Todd Larkins Williams
- Written by: Todd Larkins Williams
- Produced by: Helena Echegoyen; Nelson George
- Music by: Michael Cohen
- Production company: Post Consumer Media
- Distributed by: Trio Films
- Release date: June 26, 2004
- Running time: 86 minutes
- Country: United States
- Language: English

The N-Word is a 2004 American documentary film directed and written by Todd Larkins Williams. The movie looks into the history and usage of the word nigger and its variations.

== Interviews ==
- Sandra Bernhard
- Todd Boyd
- Elaine Brown
- LeVar Burton
- George Carlin
- CeeLo Green
- Morris Chestnut
- Stanley Crouch
- Ice Cube
- Damon Dash
- Chuck D
- Nelson George
- Whoopi Goldberg
- Dick Gregory
- Bryant Gumbel
- LisaGay Hamilton
- Samuel L. Jackson
- Quincy Jones
- Robin D.G. Kelley
- Regina King
- Talib Kweli
- Nia Long
- Wynton Marsalis
- Chi McBride
- Paul Mooney
- Alvin F. Poussaint
- Michael Rapaport
- Ving Rhames
- Chris Rock
- John Salley
- Ron Shelton
- Russell Simmons
- John Singleton
- Cree Summer
- Saul Williams
- George C. Wolfe

== Awards ==
- 2004 Peabody Award winner

== See also ==
- Guilty or Innocent of Using the N Word
