= Ain't No Other Man =

2006 single by Christina Aguilera

Single by Christina Aguilera

from the album Back to Basics
- Released: June 6, 2006
- Studio: Chalice Recording (Hollywood, Los Angeles)
- Genre: Pop; funk; R&B
- Length: 3:48
- Label: RCA
- Songwriters: Christina Aguilera; Chris E. Martin; Kara DioGuardi; Charles Martin Roane; Harold Beatty
- Producers: DJ Premier; Charles Martin Roane; Christina Aguilera

Christina Aguilera singles chronology
"Somos Novios (It's Impossible)" (2006)	"Ain't No Other Man" (2006)	"Hurt" (2006)

Music video
- "Ain't No Other Man" on YouTube

"Ain't No Other Man" is a song recorded by the American singer Christina Aguilera from her fifth studio album Back to Basics (2006). Aguilera co-wrote the song with Kara DioGuardi, Charles Martin Roane, Harold Beatty and its producer DJ Premier. "Ain't No Other Man" is a pop, funk and R&B song that incorporates elements of soul, blues and jazz music. Lyrically, the song was inspired by her marriage to Jordan Bratman in 2005.

"Ain't No Other Man" was released as the lead single from Back to Basics on June 6, 2006, by RCA Records. It received generally favorable reviews from music critics, who complimented its musical style and deemed it a standout on the album. Commercially, the single peaked at number six on the US Billboard Hot 100, number one in Croatia, and peaked within the top five of record charts of several other countries including Brazil, Canada, Finland, Germany, Ireland, Italy, New Zealand, Norway, Scotland, Switzerland and the United Kingdom.

The accompanying music video for "Ain't No Other Man" was directed by Bryan Barber. The music video goes back in time and depicts Aguilera as her then newly established alter ego "Baby Jane". The music video was praised for the "mature" image that Aguilera adopted.

"Ain't No Other Man" won Aguilera a Broadcast Music, Inc. (BMI) Pop Award (2008), as well as the Grammy Award for Best Female Pop Vocal Performance at the 49th Annual Grammy Awards (2006). The music video received four nominations at the 2006 MTV Video Music Awards, including Video of the Year. The single was certified double platinum by the Recording Industry Association of America (RIAA) for selling over two million units.

== Background and production ==
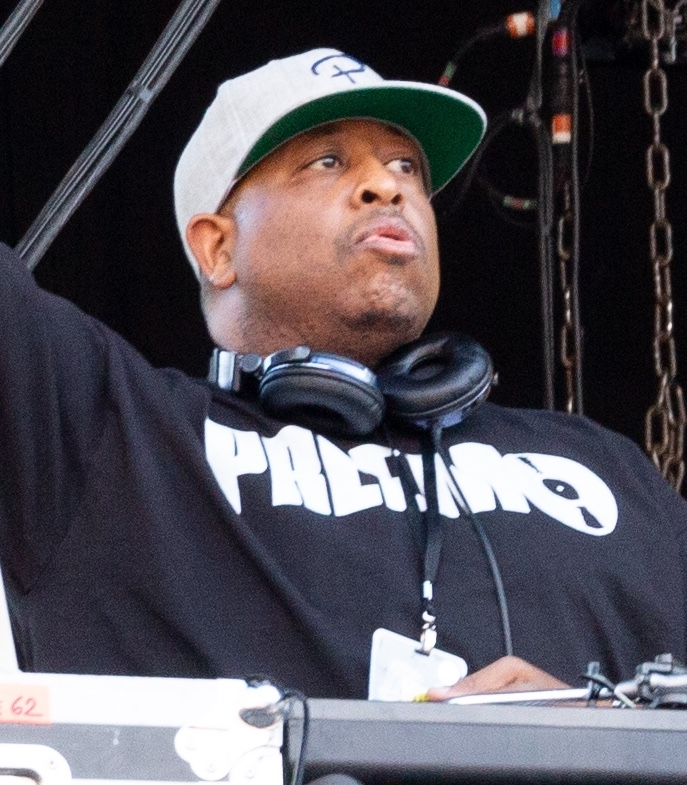
DJ Premier co-wrote and produced many songs from Back to Basics, including "Ain't No Other Man".

Following the release of her fourth studio album, Stripped (2002), and several collaborations, Aguilera decided to incorporate elements of 1930s and 1940s musical styles in her follow-up album project. She commented that she wished to evolve as an artist and a visionary in between production of the records. Aguilera sent letters to various producers whom she hoped could help her with the direction she was taking for the project, encouraging them to experiment, re-invent and create a modern soul feel.

The final product, her fifth album Back to Basics, comprises two discs. For the first half disc, Aguilera collaborated with "more beat-driven" producers including DJ Premier and Mark Ronson, who incorporated musical samples into many of the recordings. She described it as "kind of a throwback with elements of jazz, blues and soul music combined with a modern-day twist, like hard-hitting beats". The contents of the second disc were written and produced solely by Linda Perry, Aguilera's longtime collaborator. Aguilera had first collaborated with DJ Premier after hearing his jazz-influenced work with Gang Starr. She revealed that she was impressed, and she also wanted to make jazz-influenced materials. Aguilera stated that she was unsure if DJ Premier would accept the offer, having been his first time working with pop music. Premier later agreed and commented,

"I was surprised I got that call 'cause of our differences in the audiences we hit, but I'm always up for challenges and trying something new ... She described what her album is about and then she sent me some CDs of what type of stuff's been inspiring her to make the record, and it happened to be a lot of stuff that I grew up on in the early '70s, 'cause I'm 40. Aretha Franklin, Etta James, Marvin Gaye, Esther Williams, all kinds of different things. Once I saw that's the vibe she wanted, I still had to make it sound like the way my beats thump and stuff but still give her the atmosphere she's trying to bring out on the singing side."

== Composition ==
"Ain't No Other Man" (2006)
"Ain't No Other Man" is a funk song that contains samples from "Hippy Skippy Moon Strut" and "The Cissy's Thang"

"Ain't No Other Man" was written and produced by Aguilera, DJ Premier, and Charles Roane, with additional songwriting provided by Harold Beatty and Kara DioGuardi. It is a pop, funk and R&B song with elements of old-school soul, blues and jazz. Thus, the song is a mixture of old-school and contemporary materials, according to Aguilera herself.

The track contains a brass sample from "Hippy Skippy Moon Strut" by Dave Cortez & The Moon People, and a vocal sample "The Cissy's Thang" by the Soul Seven. Its instrumentation incorporates keyboards, guitar, drums, percussion, and horns. The arrangement of the instruments on "Ain't No Other Man" was described as "raw" and "ass-shaking". Several critics complimented the mixture between old and modern materials; Jody Rosen from Entertainment Weekly claimed that the jazzy melody from the track suited Aguilera perfectly, while Dorian Lyskey of The Guardian deemed the melody of "Ain't No Other Man" "fun" and "crispy".

"Ain't No Other Man" is written in the key of F minor, with a moderate fast tempo of 132 beats per minute. Aguilera's vocal range on the track spans from A♭_{3} to C_{5}. Dorian Lyskey of The Guardian noted that the beats of the song are "brassy" and have the same "aerobic oomph" as Beyoncé's "Crazy in Love", while Jody Rosen from Entertainment Weekly deemed the track "exhilarating". According to Aguilera; lyrically, "Ain't No Other Man" is not a love song, but actually intertwines with the events that she experienced in real life. The song seems to be about Aguilera's husband, Jordan Bratman, but is really simply about feeling good. During an interview with MTV News, Aguilera said of the song, "I wanted to make it light and easy for people to dance to and sing along to... Lyrically, I just got married, so it's about someone in particular, but it's all about feeling good and not taking anything too seriously".

=== Sampling lawsuit ===
In 2011, American publishing company TufAmeria sued Sony Music for the brass sample of Dave Cortez & The Moon People's "Hippy Skippy Moon Strut" (1968), which is based on "I'll Be a Happy Man" by The Latin Blues Band featuring Luis Aviles. According to a federal lawsuit filed in New York, TufAmerica purchased the exclusive rights to the track in 2004; nevertheless, Sony Music made a deal with Codigo Music and Clyde Otis Music Group to acquire the sample.

== Release ==
While writing "Ain't No Other Man", Aguilera drew inspiration from her husband Jordan Bratman, whom she wedded in 2005. DJ Premier described the track as a "sassy" and "old-Aretha [Franklin] 'Respect'" recording. He further commented that its pace was "too fast", "like 130 beats per minute" and different from his earlier projects. Though lyrics had yet to be written, Aguilera was "in love" with the "high energy" track when she first heard it. Consequentially, she chose to service "Ain't No Other Man" as the lead single from Back to Basics. A remix featuring rapper Chamillionaire was released additionally. Originally Big Boi was supposed to record a verse for the song.

In May 2023, the official house remix of the single was released, produced by British duo Murphy's Law. Titled "Ain't No Other Man (Rework)", it was distributed by RCA and Legacy Recordings. Aguilera herself approved the new, electronic version of the song.

== Critical reception ==
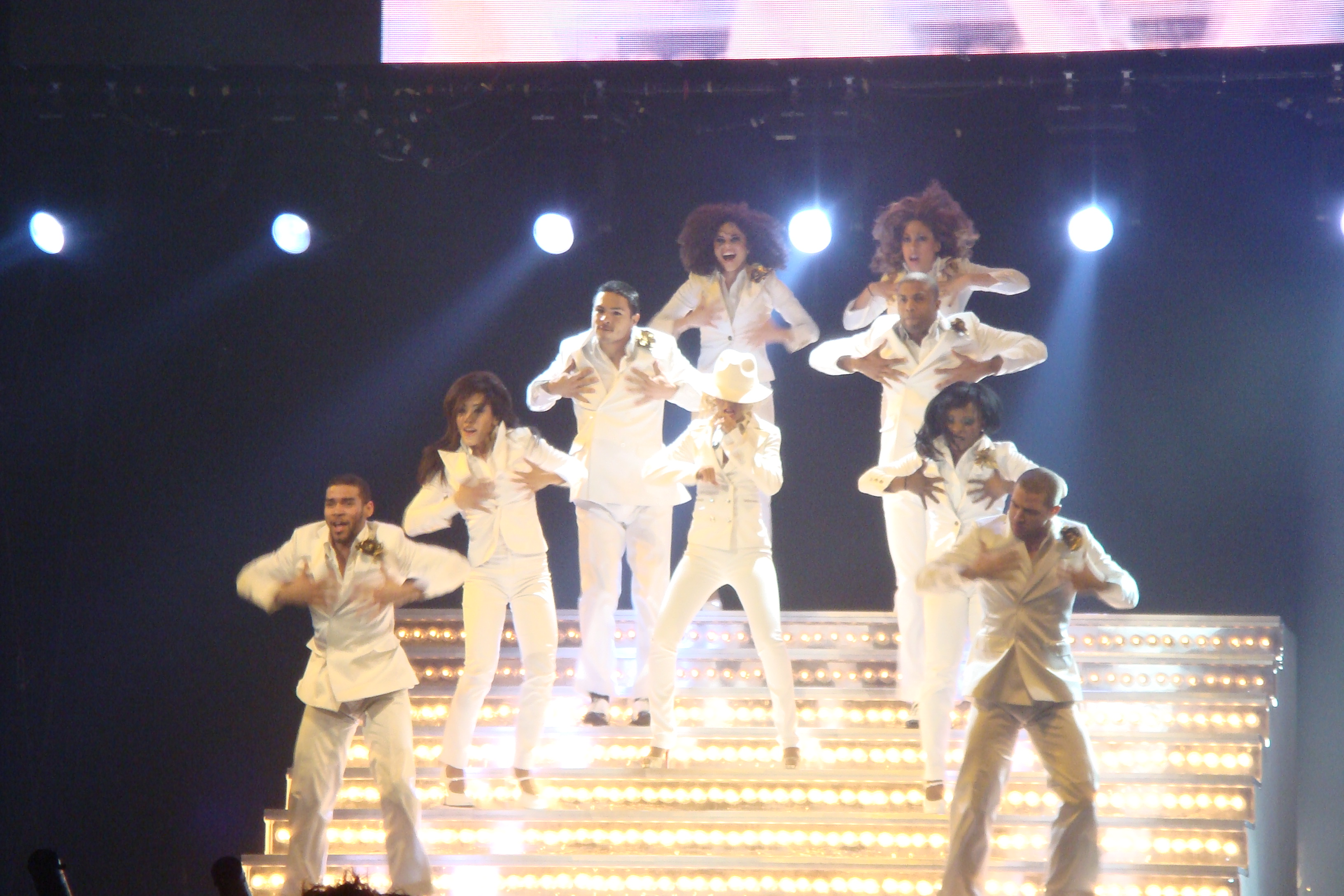
Aguilera performs the song along with her dancers

"Ain't No Other Man" received generally positive reviews from music critics. AllMusic editor Stephen Thomas Erlewine deemed "Ain't No Other Man" as one of the best tracks on Back to Basics. Jody Rosen from Entertainment Weekly wrote that the track "whizzes past at such a furious pace". John Murphy for musicOMH compared Aguilera's vocals on the track to Mariah Carey's. He further wrote that the song makes "you sit up and take notice" and deemed "Ain't No Other Man" "the best pop/R&B crossover" since Beyoncé's "Crazy in Love". Jenny Eliscu of Rolling Stone selected the track as one of the best from the first disc of Back to Basics. The same magazine praised the song for its "brassy horn samples and even brassier vocals". Charles Aaron of Spin placed the song third in his list, deeming it "blass-blasting". Stylus Magazine critic Thomas Inskeep complimented the track's mix of old-school and contemporary styles. He also called it a "sexy, sassy" song and "one of the year's best pop singles". Sean Daly of the Tampa Bay Times described the song as a "club-scorching marvel of dance-club breathlessness and brassy blasts". Entertainment Weekly's Melissa Maerz considered it "one of the most romantic marriage anthems ever". Dorian Lyskey from The Guardian gave Back to Basics a negative review, but likened "Ain't No Other Man" to Beyoncé's "Crazy in Love", calling it "brilliant" and "the tune of summer". Writing for The Morning Call, Len Righi commented that "Ain't No Other Man", "Understand" and "Slow Down Baby" "put her at Aretha Franklin's doorstep". Kelefa Sanneh for The New York Times praised the song as "the album's glorious, mile-a-minute hit single, which proves once again that no one can roar like Ms. Aguilera". Dan Gennoe of UK Yahoo! Music called it an "ass-shaking" and "sweety back-in-the-day soul" song. Billboard opined that "Ain't No Other Man" was a "savvy blend of the styles".

== Accolades ==
At the 2007 Grammy Awards, "Ain't No Other Man" earned Aguilera a Grammy Award for Best Female Pop Vocal Performance. The song also earned a BMI Award in 2008. The Village Voice's Pazz & Jop annual critics' poll voted "Ain't No Other Man" as the third best single of 2006. The song placed at number 32 on Pitchfork's list of The Top 100 Tracks of 2006. Rolling Stone ranked "Ain't No Other Man" at number 18 on their list of 2006's best songs, Paweł Nowotarski of Porcys named it the 11th best song of the year, Digital Dream Door called it the 17th best song of 2006, and LiveAbout placed it at number nineteen of a similar list. New York Post positioned the track at number thirty-three on its list of the "206 Best Songs to Download from 2006". "Ain't No Other Man" has also been nominated for the J-Wave Award, reaching number five on the countdown of the hundred best songs of the year.

Billboard deemed it "a pop classic", and placed it on its list of the 50 Best Love Songs of the 21st Century. The British magazine i-D listed it at number thirty-eight in the Best Pop Comebacks of the 21st Century ranking, calling it "immaculate". The song was also included in the book 1001 Songs You Must Hear Before You Die by Robert Dimery.

== Commercial performance ==
"Ain't No Other Man" debuted at number 19 on the US Billboard Hot 100 during the week of June 24, 2006. In the following week, it rose to number 13. On July 8, 2006, "Ain't No Other Man" reached number nine on the chart. In its fourth week charting, the song reached number six, which became its peak. It became Aguilera's first top-ten hit on the chart since "Beautiful" (2002). At the end of 2006, Billboard ranked "Ain't No Other Man" the 32nd most successful hit of the year. On the Billboard Pop Songs chart, the track peaked at number eight and remained there for a total of 20 weeks. The song was a major hit on the US dance market, peaking atop the Hot Dance Club Songs chart. "Ain't No Other Man" was recognized as the eighth best-charting single on the Hot Dance Club Songs of 2006 by Billboard. On August 15, 2006, the track was certified double platinum by the Recording Industry Association of America (RIAA) for selling more than one million digital download copies in the country. It was also certified gold for 500,000 master ringtones sold in the region. As of August 2014, "Ain't No Other Man" has sold 1,783,000 copies in the United States alone.

In Canada, the song peaked at number four on the Canadian Hot 100 and was certified platinum by Canadian Recording Industry Association for 80,000 digital sales. It was also certified gold for selling 20,000 ringtones in the country. In the United Kingdom, "Ain't No Other Man" debuted at number 18 on the UK Singles Chart during the week of July 29, 2006. In the following week, the song jumped to number two, just behind Shakira's "Hips Don't Lie" featuring Wyclef Jean. It reached number one on the UK Physical Singles Chart, as reported by the OCC. The song also gained chart success in countries around Europe, peaking at number two in Norway, number three in Hungary (both Rádiós Top 100 chart and Single Top 100 chart) and Ireland, number four in Slovakia, number five in Denmark, Finland, Germany, Italy and Switzerland, number seven in Austria, and number ten in Belgium (Flanders). Throughout Europe, "Ain't No Other Man" peaked at number three on the European Hot 100 Singles chart. The song was certified gold in Denmark by IFPI Denmark for shipping more than 7,500 copies there.

On the Australian Singles Chart, "Ain't No Other Man" debuted at number six on August 13, 2006, and remained on its peak for two weeks. In 2006, the song stayed on the chart for a total of 16 weeks. On January 14, 2007, the track re-entered the chart at number 46. Due to the commercial success in Australia, "Ain't No Other Man" was certified gold by the Australian Recording Industry Association (ARIA) for shipping 35,000 copies in the country. In New Zealand, the single peaked at number five on the New Zealand Singles Chart. The song also has been a big commercial success in Japan.

== Music video ==
=== Background ===
The accompanying music video for "Ain't No Other Man" was directed by Bryan Barber in early May 2006 and choreographed by Jeri Slaughter. After seeing a trailer of Barber's film project, Idlewild, Aguilera wanted to make a video directed by him, explained: "It intrigued me that this man, Bryan Barber, had been very locked into and had surrounded himself with this whole world of the '20s and '30s era, and it made me think that he could understand what I'm trying to do conceptually. I needed to get the right director who shared my vision". At first Aguilera planned to make a black-and-white video and shot it in her living room for Barber and Slaughter. "I had acted out the entire video in my living room. I used my fireplace as a makeshift stage and the staircase as the pool table where I would stand", said Aguilera. According to Barber, Aguilera was very involved in the making of the video. The whole team seemed like they were doing a movie more than a music video. On June 21, 2006, the music video for "Ain't No Other Man" was premiered on MTV's Total Request Live. It eventually reached number one on the TRL's chart.

=== Synopsis ===
Throughout the music video, Aguilera portrays her alter ego Baby Jane, a nickname that Nelly once gave her. The narrative scenes are punctuated by shots of two trombonists playing the Dave Cortez brass sample in unison. The video depicts a mix of sets and fashions that move chronologically from the 1920s, through the 1950s and 1960s, and ending with a contemporary style.

The video begins with a car (white Rolls-Royce Phantom), with a license plate reading "Baby Jane", stopped in front of a club, possibly a speakeasy, on a dark street in California. In front of the bar, a man is smoking a cigar. The melody of Aguilera's song "I Got Trouble", is playing in the background, with sound effects to emulate a gramophone player. Aguilera steps out of the car in high heels, wearing a classic outfit with a hat. After the car door is closed, the song begins. In the club, Aguilera starts dancing with her male and female dancers while singing the song. In the first chorus, Aguilera is in a dressing room, wearing a camisole and fur-trimmed silk dressing-gown, making up with the help of her dancers, and receiving flowers from a stranger.

During the second verse, Aguilera appears in a red 1960s-style outfit and listens to music with silver spangled headphones while a gramophone plays. While singing the second chorus, Aguilera is in front of photographers; she continues to sing in an inter-cut scene, wearing silver and gold outfits, one trimmed with fur. In the next sequence, Aguilera wears a white and black outfit with a black-sequined beret, and continues dancing through the chorus. At the bridge, she walks through the bar and finds her lover. She pushes him down on a chair and pushes him away across the polished dance-floor. She is then lifted onto the billiard table and continues to sing while the chandelier above her head begins to explode and spark fireworks. At the chorus she appears in a sparkling silver dress and makes the whole club come alive in a riot of dancing. There is a brief funk outro. As the video ends, with the club now empty of customers, Aguilera gently sings "I Got Trouble" again, lying on the piano while the people in the club watch her.

=== Reception ===
Jody Rosen for Entertainment Weekly noted, "She's revamped [...] her look, sporting an Andrews Sister bouffant and jazz-age togs in the video". Michael Slezak, another editor from Entertainment Weekly, wrote that Aguilera "rocks seven classy-sexy looks in just under five minutes, each more flawless than the one before it (especially that final silver dress and gizzorgeously wild mane)". Its choreography was also praised, "[it] is at once modern and totally in keeping with the whole Cotton Club vibe brought to life", "and just as important, Christina looks like she's having a blast throughout". Jenny Eliscu of Rolling Stone praised the video, calling it one of the best clips from the album. James Montgomery from MTV News wrote: "Aguilera kicked off her Back to Basics reinvention with this appropriately anachronistic clip, where she vamps through Prohibition-era Harlem". The music video was nominated for four MTV Video Music Awards in 2006, they are: Video of the Year, Best Female Video, Best Pop Video and Best Choreography; however, the video did not win any of them.

== Live performances ==
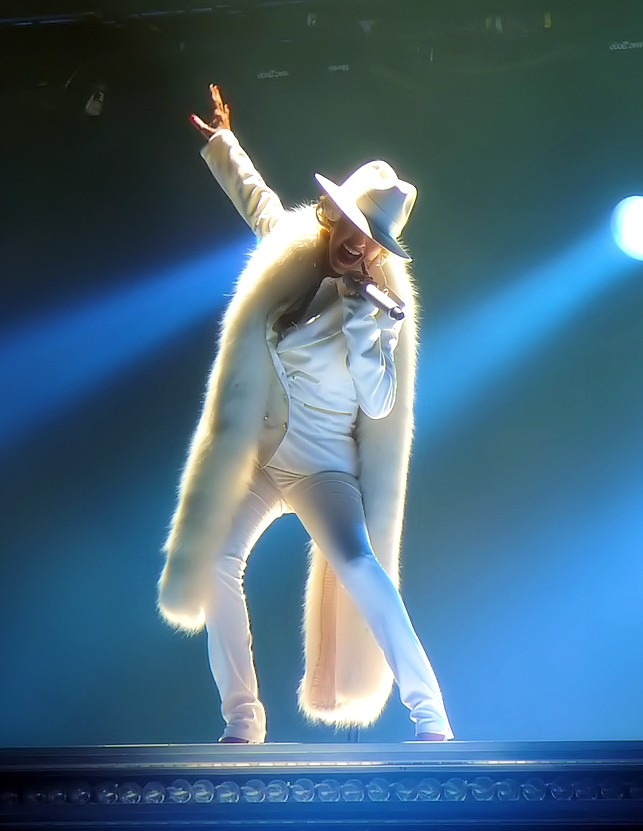
Aguilera performing "Ain't No Other Man" on the Back to Basics Tour in 2006

To promote "Ain't No Other Man" and Back to Basics, Aguilera performed the song on a number of shows and venues. On June 8, 2006, Aguilera performed "Ain't No Other Man" for the first time at the 2006 MTV Movie Awards, which was held at Sony Pictures Studios in Culver City, California. MTV praised the performance, calling her vocals during the show "vibrant". On July 20, 2006, Aguilera performed the track at the Koko jazz club in London, which was held in front of 1,500 fans and invited guests. The 40-minute concert comprised songs from the then-upcoming Back to Basics and other songs, including "Lady Marmalade" (2001) and "Beautiful" (2002). MTV UK was positive toward the performance, writing, "The gig reflected the jazz club mood of Christina's new album, with a swinging brass-heavy backing band and fit dancers bounding sexily around the stage". Aguilera performed the track live on the Late Show with David Letterman on August 16, 2006, and performed it again live on SNL on November 11, 2006. On January 20, 2007, Aguilera performed "Ain't No Other Man" at the 2007 NRJ Music Awards in Cannes, France. On February 18, 2007, Aguilera performed "Ain't No Other Man" and "Candyman" during the halftime show of the 2007 NBA All-Star Game in Las Vegas.

Aguilera performed "Fighter", "Hurt" and "Ain't No Other Man" at the 2007 Muz-TV Awards on June 1, 2007. "Ain't No Other Man" was later performed during the worldwide Back to Basics Tour (2006–2007). It was selected as the show's opener. The performance was supported by a nine-piece band and eight back-up dancers. The tour was preceded by newspapers headlines that flashed across a big screen, such as, "Christina goes from 'dirrty' to demure" and "Christina cleans up her act". The performance is included on the video release Back to Basics: Live and Down Under (2008).

On November 23, 2008, while supporting her compilation album Keeps Gettin' Better: A Decade of Hits, Aguilera performed a medley of her six hits, including "Ain't No Other Man", at the American Music Awards of 2008 held at Nokia Theatre in Los Angeles, California. On May 5, 2010, while promoting her sixth studio album, Bionic, Aguilera performed all of her hits on VH1 Storytellers, including "Ain't No Other Man". On October 24, 2010, Aguilera was invited to the Justin Timberlake & Friends benefit show at Las Vegas. There, she performed "Beautiful", "Fighter" and "Ain't No Other Man". At the show beginning, Timberlake declared that Aguilera is "the best vocalist of my generation", "no contest".

In July 2021, Aguilera performed the song for two nights at the Hollywood Bowl with Gustavo Dudamel and the Los Angeles Philharmonic. She also sang excerpts from the song during the 47th People's Choice Awards. In November 2024, Aguilera performed "Ain't No Other Man" along with Sabrina Carpenter at her Short n' Sweet Tour show in Los Angeles.

== Usage in media ==
In 2018, "Ain't No Other Man" was featured in RuPaul's Drag Race, performed by Kalorie Karbdashian-Williams and Vanessa Vanjie Mateo. The song was also used in the 2023 Netflix comedy drama series Glamorous, starring Kim Cattrall. During Fox's postgame coverage of the deciding Game 5 of the 2006 World Series, the song was played to a highlight package of winning pitcher Jeff Weaver's performance.

== Track listing and formats ==
Digital download

1. "Ain't No Other Man" – 3:48

Maxi single

1. "Ain't No Other Man" – 3:47
2. "Ain't No Other Man" (Jake Ridley Club Mix) – 6:01
3. "Ain't No Other Man" (Ospina Sullivan Radio Mix) – 3:45
4. "Ain't No Other Man" (Acappella) – 3:28

CD single

1. "Ain't No Other Man" – 3:48
2. "Ain't No Other Man" (Instrumental) – 3:48

Digital download – Dance Vault Mixes

1. "Ain't No Other Man" (Ospina Sullivan Radio Mix) – 3:45
2. "Ain't No Other Man" (Junior Vasquez Club Mix) – 6:44
3. "Ain't No Other Man" (Shape: UK Classica Mix) – 8:45
4. "Ain't No Other Man" (Shape: UK Nocturnal Groove) – 9:16
5. "Ain't No Other Man" (Ospina Sullivan Club Mix) – 7:11
6. "Ain't No Other Man" (Ospina Sullivan Dub Mix) – 5:38
7. "Ain't No Other Man" (Jake Ridley Radio Mix) – 3:50
8. "Ain't No Other Man" (Jake Ridley Club Mix) – 6:01
9. "Ain't No Other Man" (Scotty K Bootleg Radio) – 4:16
10. "Ain't No Other Man" (Scotty K Bootleg Mixshow) – 5:44

== Credits and personnel ==
Credits are taken from the liner notes of "Ain't No Other Man" CD single.

=== Recording and sampling ===
- Recorded in 2005 at Chalice Recording Studios in Hollywood
- Contains a repeated brass sample of "Hippy Skippy Moon Strut", as performed by Dave Cortez & The Moon People
- Contains a brief vocal sample of "The Cissy's Thang", as performed by the Soul Seven

=== Personnel ===
- Songwriting – Christina Aguilera, Kara DioGuardi, Chris E. Martin, Harold Beatty, Charles Roane
- Producing – DJ Premier
- Co-producing – Christina Aguilera, Charles Roane
- Lead vocals – Christina Aguilera
- Vocals producing – Rob Lewis
- Engineering – DJ Premier, Oscar Ramirez, Charles Roane
- Arrangement – Davidson Ospina, Dan Sullivan
- Keyboards – Davidson Ospina
- Guitar – Tareq Akoni
- Drums – DJ Premier
- Percussion – DJ Premier, Ray Yslas
- Mixing – Charles Roane
- Mixing assistant – Jordan Laws
- Remixing – Davidson Ospina, Dan Sullivan
- Photography – Ellen Von Unwerth

== Charts ==
=== Weekly charts ===
Weekly chart performance for "Ain't No Other Man"
Chart (2006)	Peak position
Australia (ARIA)	6
Australia Digital Tracks (ARIA)	2
Austria (Ö3 Austria Top 40)	7
Belgium (Ultratop 50 Flanders)	10
Belgium (Ultratop 50 Wallonia)	27
Canada Hot AC (Billboard)	2
Canada CHR/Top 40 (Billboard)	2
CIS Airplay (TopHit)	31
Croatia International (HRT)	1
Czech Republic Airplay (ČNS IFPI)	15
Denmark Airplay (Tracklisten)	5
European Hot 100 Singles (Billboard)	3
Finland (Suomen virallinen lista)	5
France (SNEP)	26
Germany (GfK)	5
Germany (Deutsche Black Charts)	1
Global Dance Tracks (Billboard)	7
Hungary (Rádiós Top 40)	3
Hungary (Single Top 40)	3
Ireland (IRMA)	3
Italy (FIMI)	5
Lithuania (EHR)	8
Luxembourg Airplay (RTL Télé Lëtzebuerg)	8
Netherlands (Dutch Top 40)	12
Netherlands (Single Top 100)	11
New Zealand (Recorded Music NZ)	5
Norway (VG-lista)	2
Romania (Romanian Top 100)	19
Scottish Singles Sales (Official Charts)	2
Slovakia Airplay (ČNS IFPI)	4
Sweden (Sverigetopplistan)	15
Switzerland (Schweizer Hitparade)	5
UK Singles (Official Charts)	2
UK Hip Hop/R&B (Official Charts)	1
US Billboard Hot 100	6
US Adult Pop Airplay (Billboard)	19
US Dance Club Songs (Billboard)	1
US Dance Airplay (Billboard)	1
US Pop Airplay (Billboard)	8
US Rhythmic Airplay (Billboard)	29
Venezuela Pop Rock (Record Report)	4

=== Year-end charts ===
Year-end chart performance for "Ain't No Other Man"
Chart (2006)	Position
Australia (ARIA)	34
Austria (Ö3 Austria Top 40)	53
Belgium (Ultratop 50 Flanders)	63
Brazil (Crowley)	42
CIS (TopHit)	149
European Hot 100 Singles (Billboard)	46
Germany (Media Control GfK)	54
Germany (Deutsche Black Charts)	9
Hungary (Rádiós Top 40)	19
Italy (FIMI)	42
Lebanon (NRJ)	15
Netherlands (Dutch Top 40)	55
Netherlands (Single Top 100)	66
Sweden (Hitlistan)	94
Switzerland (Schweizer Hitparade)	26
UK Singles (OCC)	33
UK Urban (Music Week)	17
US Billboard Hot 100	32
US Dance Club Play (Billboard)	8
US Hot Dance Airplay (Billboard)	4
US Pop 100 (Billboard)	19

=== Decade-end charts ===
Decade-end chart performance for "Ain't No Other Man"
Chart (2000–2009)	Position
US Dance Club Songs (Billboard)	46

== Certifications and sales ==
Certifications and sales for "Ain't No Other Man"
Region	Certification	Certified units/sales
Australia (ARIA)	Gold	35,000^{^}
Canada (Music Canada)	Platinum	20,000^{*}
Canada (Music Canada) Mastertone	Gold	20,000^{*}
Denmark (IFPI Danmark)	Gold	4,000^{^}
New Zealand (RMNZ)	Gold	15,000^{‡}
United Kingdom (BPI)	Gold	400,000^{‡}
United States (RIAA)	2× Platinum	2,000,000^{‡}
United States (RIAA) Mastertone	Gold	500,000^{*}
^{*} Sales figures based on certification alone.^{^} Shipments figures based on certification alone.^{‡} Sales+streaming figures based on certification alone.

== Release history ==
Release dates and formats for "Ain't No Other Man"
Region	Date	Format(s)	Label(s)	Ref.
United States	June 6, 2006	Contemporary hit radio; rhythmic contemporary radio	RCA	
United States	July 18, 2006	12-inch vinyl	RCA	
United Kingdom	July 24, 2006	CD	RCA	
Germany	July 28, 2006	Maxi CD	Sony BMG	
New Zealand	July 28, 2006	Digital download (EP)	Sony BMG	
United Kingdom	July 28, 2006	Digital download	RCA	
Switzerland	July 31, 2006	CD; maxi CD	Sony BMG	
France	September 25, 2006	CD; maxi CD	Sony BMG	

== See also ==
- List of number-one dance singles of 2006 (U.S.)
