= Trio (TV network) =

American television network

- Trio logo
- Country: United States
- Broadcast area: National

Programming
- Picture format: 480i (SDTV)

Ownership
- Owner: Canadian Broadcasting Corporation (1994–2000); Power Corporation of Canada (1994–2000); USA Network/NBC Universal (2000–2006)
- Sister channels: Newsworld International

History
- Launched: June 1, 1994; 32 years ago
- Closed: January 1, 2006; 20 years ago (11 years and 7 months)
- Replaced by: Sleuth

Trio (stylized as TR!O) was an American cable and satellite television network owned jointly by USA Networks and NBCUniversal.

Trio went on the air in 1994, then originally owned and operated jointly by the Canadian Broadcasting Corporation and Power Broadcasting Inc. (a subsidiary of Power Corporation of Canada) along with 24-hour international news channel Newsworld International. The channel served as a venue for airing the CBC's arts, culture and entertainment programming in the United States. It was sold to USA Networks in 2000, and was subsequently transferred to Vivendi Universal and later NBC Universal.

With the slogan, "pop, culture, TV", Trio programming under Vivendi/NBC Universal ownership focused on television as a cultural tool and art form.

In January 2005, Trio was dropped from DirecTV, eliminating about two-thirds of the homes that could receive the network. On November 21, 2005, NBC Universal announced that the Trio brand would be transferred to a broadband Internet TV initiative under the Bravotv.com banner on January 1, 2006. Cable and satellite providers still carrying Trio were offered a new NBC Universal cable network instead, called Sleuth, which was renamed Cloo in 2011 and continued on until its sudden closure on February 1, 2017.

== Notable Trio programs ==
=== Original ===
- The N-Word, Peabody Award–winning documentary starring Whoopi Goldberg, Samuel L. Jackson and many other African American celebrities discussing the origin and power of the word nigger.
- Outlaw Comic: The Censoring of Bill Hicks, documentary hosted by Janeane Garofalo, focusing on his David Letterman appearances, especially his last one, where he was cut from the program.
- The Award Show Awards Show, examination of America's obsession with awards
- The Christmas Special Christmas Special
- Film Fanatic, cinema, hosted by Amy Sedaris
- Flops 101: Lessons from the Biz
- TV's Most Censored Moments, a documentary about censorship in television.
- The Blockbuster Imperative, a documentary about Hollywood's obsession with blockbuster movies.
- Saturday Spin Theatre, feature films like Leon the Pig Farmer and The Legend of the North Wind.

=== Reruns ===
- Adrenaline Junkies (a.k.a. Medivac) (1999–2002)
- Airline (1999–2002)
- All Saints (1999–2002)
- Battle of the Network Stars (2003–04)
- Black Harbour (1998–2004)
- Blue Heelers (1996–2004)
- Brides of Christ (1993–96)
- Bugs (1999–2002)
- Coming Home (1999–2001)
- Coronation Street (1999–2004)
- Counterstrike (1994–1999)
- Cracker (1999–2002)
- The Dame Edna Experience (2002–04)
- The Damnation of Harvey McHugh (1999–02)
- Deepwater Black (1998–2000)
- Degrassi (1994–2004)
- Dog House (1996–99)
- The Dreamstone (1994–96)
- Duggan (1999–2002)
- EGG, the Arts Show (2003–04)
- E.N.G. (1994–98)
- The Fifth Estate (1994–99)
- Flightpath (Canadian TV series) (1998–2004)
- Good Guys, Bad Guys (1999–2002)
- Hot Type (1999–2004)
- Judy Garland Show Christmas Special (1994–96, 2003–04)
- Kath & Kim (2002–04)
- Late Night with David Letterman (1994–96, 2003–04)
- The Little Flying Bears (1997–2000)
- The Littlest Hobo (1995–1999)
- London's Burning (1997–2004)
- Madison (1996–2004)
- Max Glick (1996–99, 2001–02)
- McCallum (1998–2003)
- MediaTelevision (1998–2004)
- Mercury (1997–2003)
- Mr. Dressup (1994–2000)
- Mysterious Island (1996–2000)
- Nancherrow (1999–2001)
- The Nature of Things (1994–1998)
- New York Undercover (2001–02)
- North of 60 (1995–2004)
- Northwood (1994–99)
- Once Upon a Hamster (1996–2000)
- Pink Lady (1994–1996, 2003–04)
- Queen for a Day (1994–96)
- The Raccoons (1995–99)
- Rowan & Martin's Laugh-In (2001–04)
- SCTV (1994–99, 2003–04)
- The Secret Rulers of the World (1994–96)
- Sessions at West 54th (2001–04)
- Spaced (2002–04)
- Street Legal (1995–2004)
- Taggart (1994–2002)
- Traders (1998–2002)
- Undercurrents (1995–04)
- A Very British Coup (1994–96)
- Young People's Concerts (1994–96)

=== Brilliant But Cancelled ===
This was the umbrella title under which Trio aired repeats of series that had very short lives on mainstream broadcast television, yet were still considered to be programming that "broke the mold" of what was normally expected from the "Big Three" networks. Series that appeared under the Brilliant But Cancelled umbrella included:

- Action
- Bakersfield P.D.
- Brideshead Revisited
- Charlie Cobb: Nice Night for a Hanging
- Diner (pilot)
- East Side/West Side
- The Ernie Kovacs Show
- EZ Streets
- Fargo (pilot)
- God, the Devil and Bob
- Johnny Staccato
- Kolchak: The Night Stalker
- L.A. Confidential (pilot)
- Lookwell (pilot)
- Now and Again
- Parenthood
- Profit
- The PJs
- United States

Brilliant But Cancelled was later used by Universal as a title for a series of DVDs that feature samples of short-lived series. Two of these have been released—one being a sampler of short-lived crime drama series, while the other was selected episodes of EZ Streets.

=== Flops ===
Special airing of shows that flopped.

- Cop Rock
- My Mother the Car
- Pink Lady and Jeff

(The Secret Diary of Desmond Pfeiffer was supposed to air, but was pulled due to the controversial nature of the program, which played for laughs during the relationship between a black nobleman and President Abraham Lincoln during the American Civil War).
