= The Fabulous Bitch Ball =

2012 episode of RuPaul's Drag Race

- RuPaul's Drag Race episode
- Episode no.: Season 4 Episode 11
- Presented by: RuPaul
- Original air date: April 2, 2012

Episode chronology
← Previous "DILFs: Dads I'd Like to Frock"	Next → "RuPaul Rewind"
- RuPaul's Drag Race season 4

"The Fabulous Bitch Ball" (sometimes stylized as "The Fabulous B*tch Ball") is the eleventh episode of the fourth season of the American television series RuPaul's Drag Race. It originally aired on April 9, 2012. The episode's main challenge tasks the contestants with presenting three looks in a fashion show. Wynonna Judd and Rose McGowan are guest judges.

Sharon Needles wins the episode's main challenge. Latrice Royale is eliminated from the competition after placing in the bottom and losing a lip-sync contest against Chad Michaels to "No One Else on Earth" (1992) by Wynonna Judd.

== Episode ==
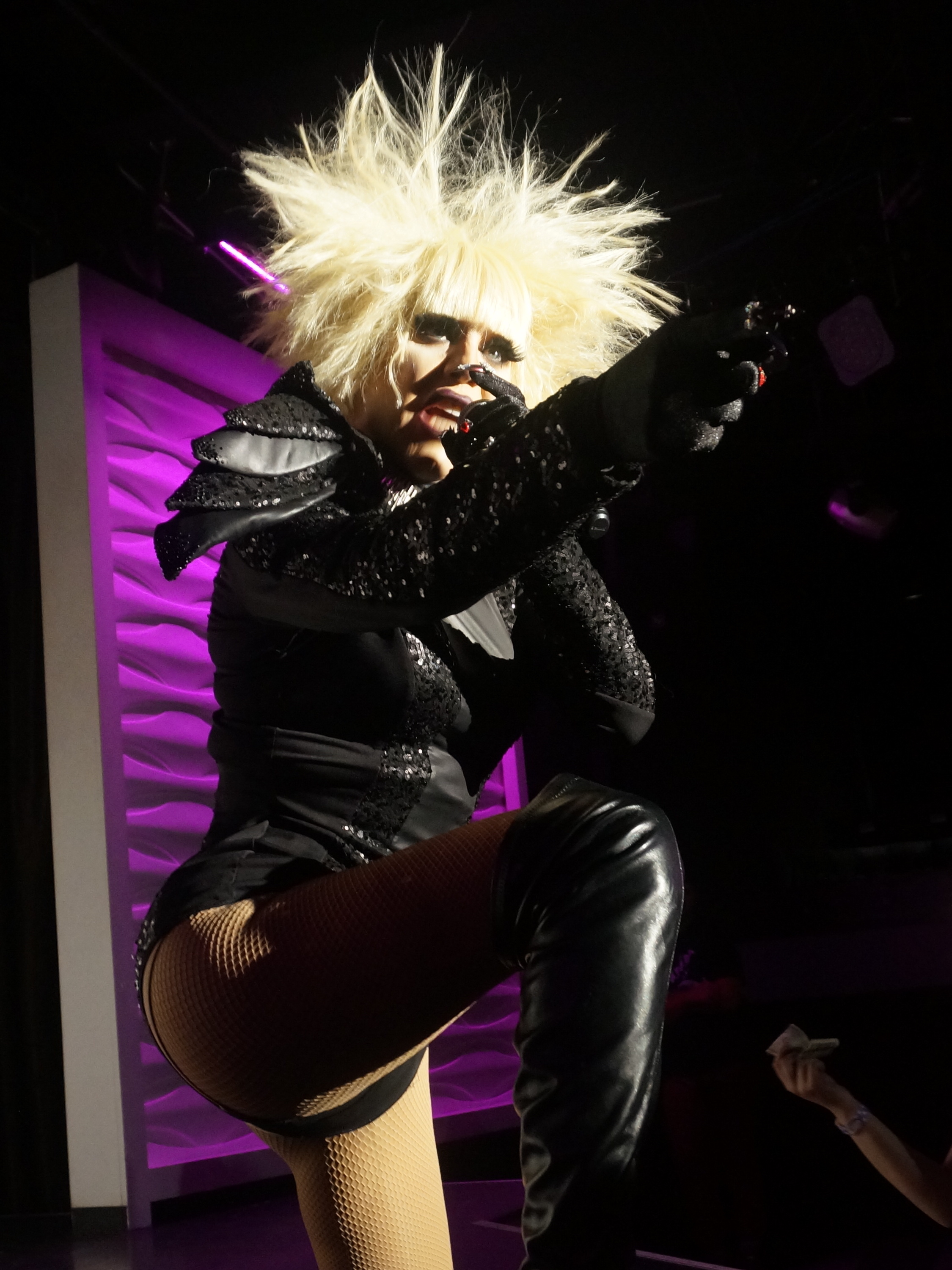
Sharon Needles wins the episode's main challenge.

The contestants return to the workroom and read Kenya Michaels's message on the mirror. RuPaul greets the group and reveals the mini-challenge, which tasks the contestants with using puppets to playfully insult one another. Chad Michaels is declared the winner of the mini-challenge.

RuPaul then reveals the main challenge, which tasks the contestants with creating three looks for the Bitch Ball. The categories are "Daytime Dog Park", "Pooch in a Purse" and "Canine Couture". For the latter category, the contestants must create a high-fashion look, inspired by a dog. As the winner of the mini-challenge, Chad Michaels gets to assign dogs to each contestant. Following are the contestants and dog breeds:

- Chad Michaels – Chinese Crested
- Latrice Royale – Pomeranian
- Phi Phi O'Hara – Bloodhound
- Sharon Needles – Poodle

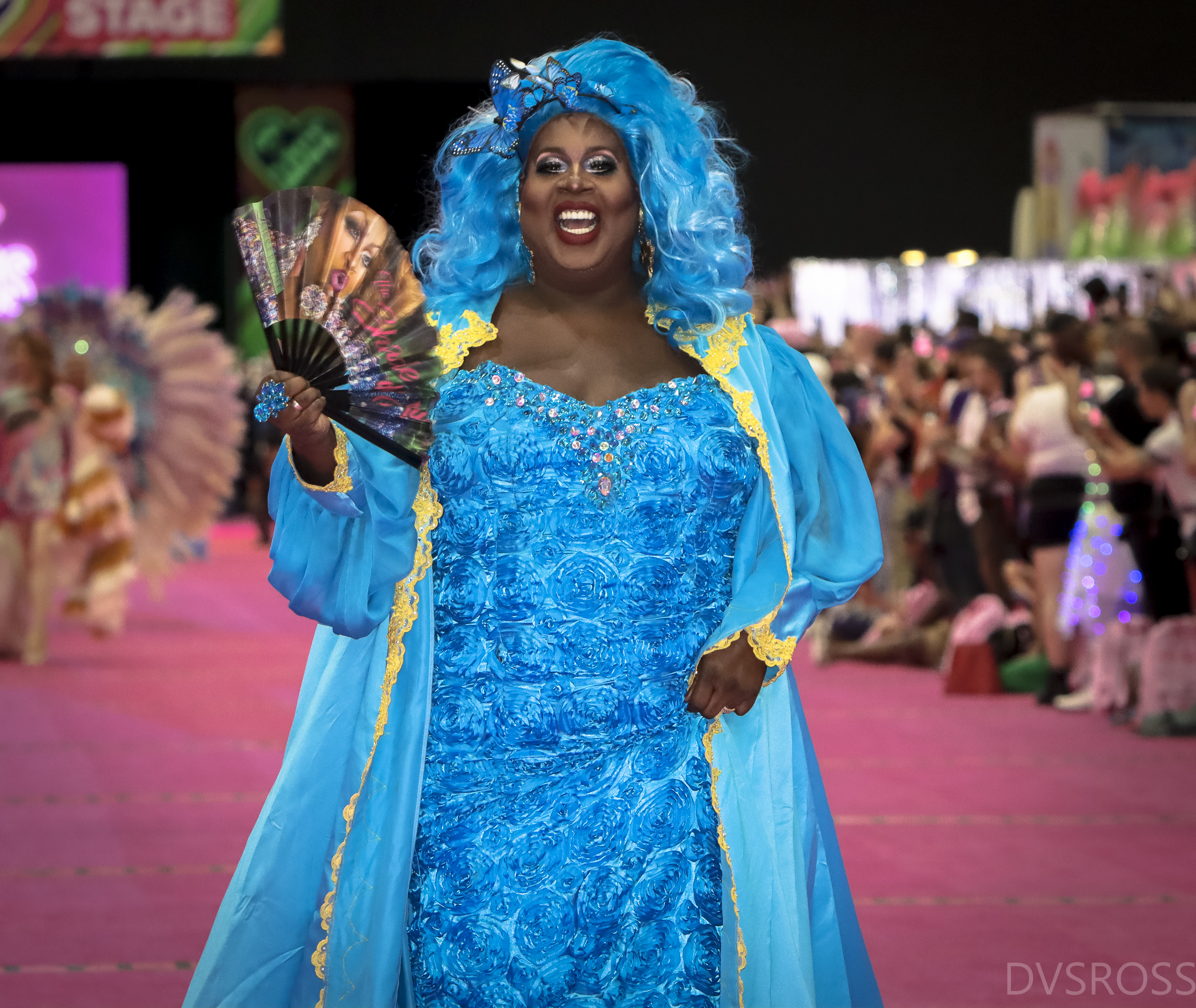
Latrice Royale (pictured at RuPaul's DragCon LA in 2022) is eliminated from the competition.

The contestants begin to prepare for the fashion show. RuPaul returns to the workroom to meet with each contestant, asking questions and offering advice. Before leaving, RuPaul reveals that Wynonna Judd and Rose McGowan are guest judges and that the contestants must perform a Cats-inspired Broadway-style opening number. The contestants rehearse choreography for the opening number on the main stage, then make final preparations in the workroom for the fashion show.

On the main stage, RuPaul welcomes fellow judges Michelle Visage and Santino Rice, as well as guest judges Judd and McGowan. RuPaul shares the assignment of the main challenge, then the opening number and fashion show commence. After the contestants present their looks, the judge deliver their critiques. RuPaul asks each contestants to say who they think should be eliminated from the competition. After the contestants provide their responses, the judges deliberate, then share the results with the group. Sharon Needles is declared the winner of the main challenge. Chad Michaels and Latrice Royale place in the bottom and face off in a lip-sync contest to Judd's 1992 song "No One Else on Earth". Chad Michaels wins the lip-sync and Latrice Royale is eliminated from the competition. Latrice Royale returns to the workroom to write a message on the mirror for the remaining contestants.

== Production and broadcast ==
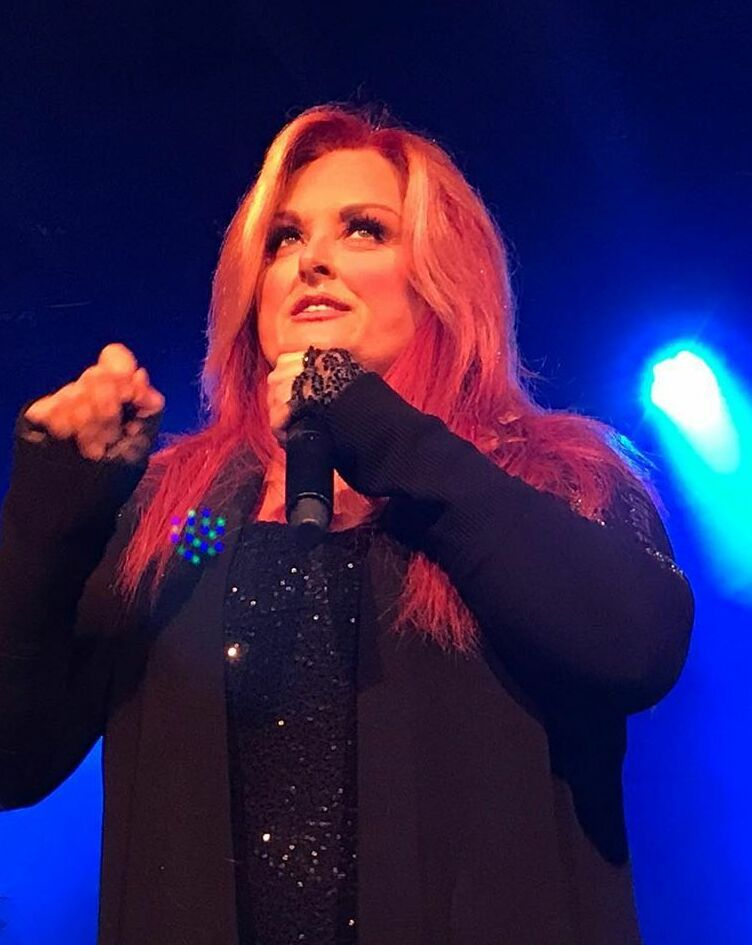
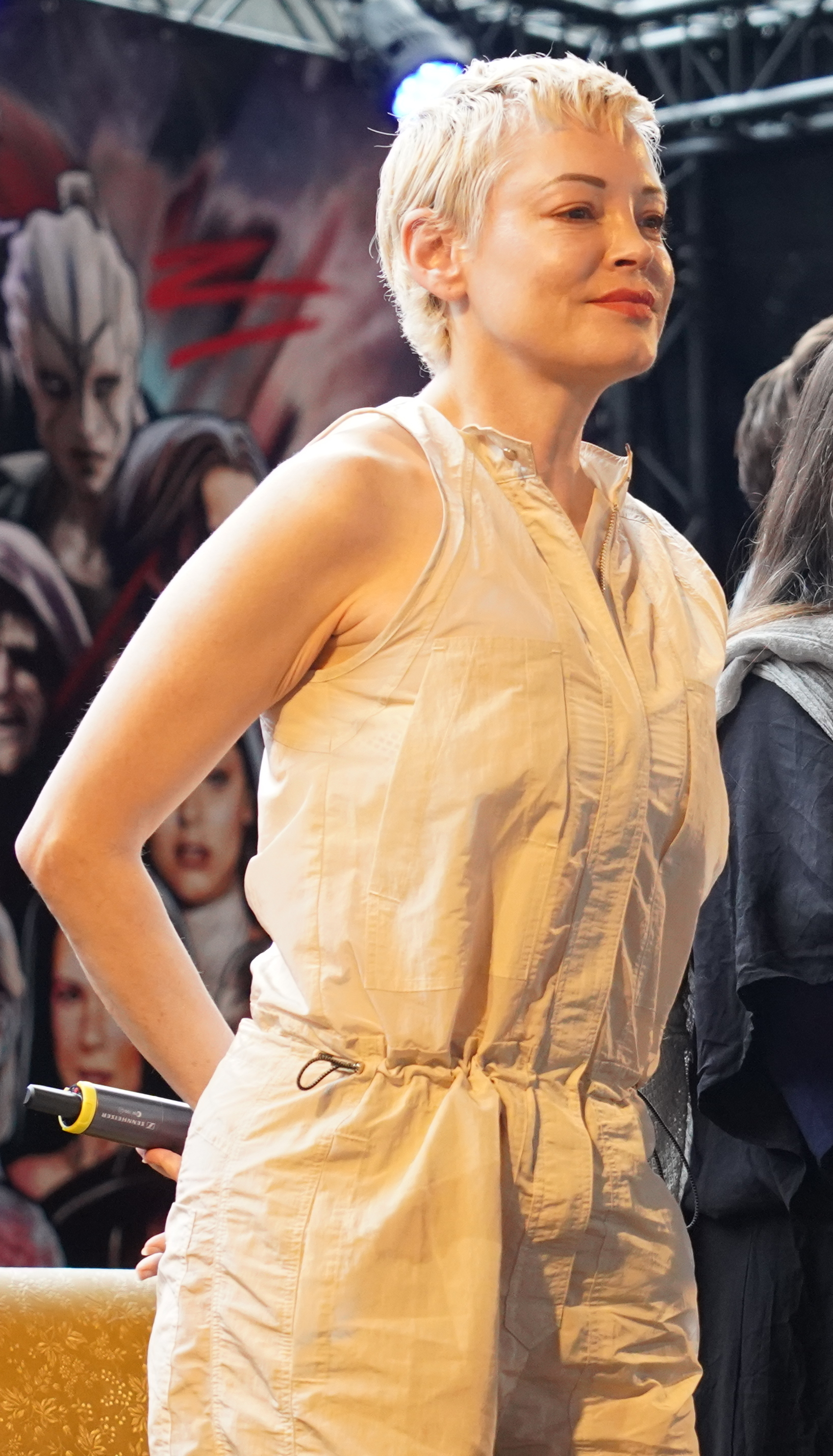
Wynonna Judd (top) and Rose McGowan (bottom) are guest judges.

The episode originally aired on April 9, 2012.

Shawn Morales is among members of the Pit Crew.

While eliminating Latrice Royale, RuPaul tells her, "I bow to you. And I have one thing to say: Bitches better beware." In response, Latrice Royale says to RuPaul, "You have changed my life forever. You have changed the world of drag forever. I love you and respect you so much, and thank you for seeing something special in me. Thank you."

=== Fashion ===
For the main stage, RuPaul wore a black dress with roses, a matching headband and a blonde wig. For the opening number, the contestants resemble dogs, with ears, collars, paws and tails.

For the category "Daytime Dog Park", Latrice Royale wore a short navy shirt with glitter, a black top with a matching purse and a dark wig. Phi Phi O'Hara had a short pink dress, a purple top, a pink bow and a blonde-and-dark wig. She carries a pooper-scooper. Sharon Needles wore a short dress with a floral print and a blonde wig. Chad Michaels had a short pink dress, a white top and a brown wig.

For "Pooch in a Purse", Latrice Royale wore a short dress with a gold top and a handbag with a stuffed dog. Phi Phi O'Hara had a gray jacket and a red wig. Sharon Needles wore black shorts, a black T-shirt, tights, a headband, sunglasses and a blonde wig. Chad Michaels wore a short black dress and a matching wig. She had a black handbag with a stuffed dog.

For "Canine Couture", Latrice Royale wore a long dress with a fur collar and a dark wig. Phi Phi O'Hara had a jacket, a short skirt, tall boots and a blonde wig. Sharon Needles wore a black dress fur-covered boots to match her poodle. Her wig is blonde and she had a black hat. Chad Michaels had gold pants, a cape, boots and a blonde wig.

== Reception ==
Oliver Sava of The A.V. Club gave the episode a rating of 'A'. Kevin O'Keeffe ranked the "No One Else on Earth" performance number 112 in INTO Magazine's 2018 "definitive ranking" of the show's lip-sync contests to date. Sam Brooks ranked the performance number 66 in The Spinoff's 2019 "definitive ranking" of the show's 162 lip-syncs to date.

== See also ==
- Cultural depictions of dogs
