= Onionz =

American technology & music inspiration, DJ, and musician

- Born: Andrew Venegas; 1970 (age 55–56); Bayside, Queens, New York City, U.S.
- Origin: New York City
- Genres: Techno, House, EDM
- Occupations: DJ, Musician, producer, businessman
- Instruments: Drums, DJ
- Years active: 1982–present
- Labels: Electrik Soul Recordings (founder); Warner Music/Rhino Records; Om Records; Defected Records; Champion Records
- Award: Billboard Magazine’s DanceStar USA Awards nomination (2002, Best Breakthrough DJ)

Andrew Venegas (born in 1970 in Bayside, Queens, New York City), known by his stage name Onionz, is an American techno DJ, musician, producer who has been on the forefront of AI technology as a sales and business developer on Silicon Alley. During 2012 in New York Andrew was with Mike Brown of https://bowerycap.com/team/michael-brown for a Social Media Optimization acquisition with a focus on creatives and media with an exit in 2022. Andrew then morphed into plant based fuels, utilities, Graphene supply chain and building materials.

The native New Yorker is known for his many contributions to Electronic Music, and more specifically, his unique signature sound. After working at the #1 record importer in America he was part of the Apple Logic testing team for 21 years. As a born drummer and on the stage when he was 3 passing through the drumming rituals legends provide. His teachers were Candido Camero, Steve Berrios, Greg D’Angelo of Anthrax and White Lion.

His family has been in New York for over 150 years and in the music industry since the 1940s. His brother an inspiration to Andrew through his paintings and traveling together. His father Victor is an American success story who was stationed in the military in Germany in the early 1900s and met his mother Joy soon after his return. Victor is in the Grammy Hall Of Fame for Mongo Santamaria’s induction of Watermelon Man which Victor played and composed bass for https://www.grammy.com/awards/hall-of-fame-award . In the 50’s, 60’s and 70’s Victor went on to play for Mongo Santamaria, and in The New York Philharmonic under John Schaefer https://www.isbworldoffice.com/in-memory.asp. Victor a woodsman from the Alfonso Vavarrah group, built basses and was a teacher for many Grammy nominated bass players and world renowned musicians. Andrew’s grandfather Jack was the electrical installation group who wired Lincoln Square, Lincoln Center and Avery Fischer Hall, his father played bass for The Philharmonic and the Metropolitan Opera, Onionz Dj’d at Lincoln Square at Essence 3.

Andrew followed his father's footsteps. In 2006 landing #12 on the Official Global Dance Charts https://www.officialcharts.com/charts/dance-singles-chart/20060604/104/ In 2002, he was nominated for Billboard Magazine’s DanceStar USA Awards in the "Best Breakthrough DJ" category. Onionz' earliest musical influence was his family. As a youth, Onionz gained further musical inspiration from David Mancuso (The Loft NYC creator), DJ/producer duo The Latin Rascals. By mid-1982, Onionz began mixing together early styles of Hip hop, Breakbeat, and Disco records while DJing local NYC venues like The Irish Cottage in Woodside, New York.

Over the last 38 years Onionz has toured and headlined premier dance music festivals and events throughout 45 states within the US and 38 countries abroad. Onionz has held residency at celebrated dance venues around the world.

Within the past 38 years, Onionz has contributed to both house music and techno music as a DJ with The Orb, DjThree, Josh Wink, Darren Emerson, Slam and Sven Vath. original productions and remixes to numerous dance music artists & record label as Slam, Carl Cox, Warner Music/Rhino Records, Om Records, Defected Records, Champion Records, and Ibadan Records. Additionally, he produced commissioned remixes for many influential dance music artists including Carl Cox, Robin S #1 hit "Show Me Love", Roy Ayers, Robert Owens, and Sandy B Billboard #1 "Make My World Go Round". In 1994, he founded his record label Electrik Soul Recordings. Electrik Soul has added to the success of Kaskade, Moby, Dubtribe, Yousef, Tony Senghore, Leo Young Eli Escobar, Wally Callerio, Vitamin D.

During the beginning of the dot.com period in Silicon Valley, Andrew was one of the entertainers responsible for inspiring the emerging technology industry at night. He DJed at the San Francisco night club the EndUp, and on the 4th of July at the Grateful Dead farms. His father once played at The Filmore in San Francisco with Jimi Hendrix and Santana.

Onionz took off into Agriculture technology under Jason Soares Agriculture company. Created renewable record sleeves, and became part of several music and technology acquisitions. Going back to school for Graphene and Green Charcoal Andrew has designed the future of music and AI for analog musicians to be protected inside of urban cities.

He remains an active music maker as a drummer, and travels from time to time for work throughout the world. He has a production catalog of 150+ original music tracks and remixes which continues to grow. Notable House and Techno DJ's incorporate his music into their DJ sets.

During 2016 and 2017 Onionz wrote his first film score as musical director for the short film created by Rosa Costanza called "Xing" Onionz lead and introduced the Xing Film team to the top echelon of Electronic Music using his 38 years of relationship building. The film won its way to 18 film festivals and two awards including a screening at the 2017 Cannes Film Festival.

Andrew Venegas Onionz is the longest standing techno DJ from Queens, New York, who is part of a small group of three Onionz, Joey Beltram and Omar Santana who created an opportunity in their hometown.

== Discography ==
=== Original works ===
- Onionz - Hot 4 U : 2016 Mixes - Household Digital
- Onionz - SpaceSlave - Uniting Souls
- Onionz - Buya - Blue Records
- Onionz - Beautiful Music - NightChild Records
- Onionz - Free Spirit - Blinded Records
- Onionz - Need Ya, Tatti’s Groove - Intec Records
- Onionz - Peel Pressure - Seamless Recordings
- Onionz - The Touch E.P. - Mile End Records
- Onionz - Begunnin - Electrik Soul Recordings
- Onionz - Share The World - Digital Memory Music
- Onionz - Summertime Saves Me - Electrik Soul Recordings
- Onionz - Carmelized E.P. - Release Musiq
- Onionz - Badunkadunk EP - Nervous Records
- Onionz - N.Y. Thunder - Mile End Records
- Onionz - Fantasy Island - Electrik Soul Recordings
- Onionz - 1+1=3 - Electrik Soul Recordings
- Onionz - Old Shamanic Ritual - Electrik Soul Recordings
- Onionz - Set U Free - Electrik Soul Recordings
- Onionz - Burnt - Electrik Soul Recordings
- Onionz - Dancing For The Dead - Endemic Recordings
- Onionz - Liquid Salsa - Electrik Soul Recordings
- Onionz - Space Bass - Endemic Recordings
- Onionz - Sex And Drums Feat. Jake Childs - Stripped Recordings
- Onionz - Road Warrior - Unrivaled Music
- Onionz - Smoke Signals/ Big Popsicle - Cr2
- Onionz - Nothin But Love - Toolroom Records
- Onionz - Don't Slip Away - Hardplace Recordings
- Onionz - Your Love - Forensic
- Onionz - The Calling - Hardplace Recordings
- Onionz - Woman Of The Sun - Om Records
- Onionz - If I Only Had A Brain - Industry Recordings
- Onionz - Burning - Cr2 Recordings
- Onionz - Play Dat Song - 20/20 Vision
- Onionz - Chief Rocka Hot For U - Household Recordings
- Onionz + Nick Chatellan - Drama Moda - One Off Recordings
- Onionz - Swing E.P. - Carioca
- Onionz - Doin Damage E.P. - Dae Recordings
- Onionz - Backyard Chronicles - Treehouse
- Onionz - Drum Circle - Household
- Onionz - Soul Ting - Viberent
- Onionz - Hermanos Y Hermanas - Goanche
- Onionz - Master D Holy Ghost Power - Electrik Soul Recordings
- Onionz - The Brand E.P. - Playback
- Onionz - Gettin Thru It - Mi Casa
- Onionz + Joeski - Tattoo Sessions - Maya
- Onionz + Tony + Master D - The Music - Detour
- Onionz - Horns In My Cave - Detour
- Onionz - Acid Chants - Mozee Musik
- Blakkat + The Barrio Brothers - Understanding - Electrik Soul Recordings
- Onionz - For These Who Know E.P. - Aztalan
- Onionz + Tony - Summer - Tango
- Onionz + Master D - Electriksoul Brothers - Tango
- Onionz + Master D - Silver Lightening - Electriksoul
- Onionz - Latin Hustler - Siesta
- Onionz + Joeski + Master D - Touch Me - Electriksoul
- Onionz + Master D - 4Th Dimension Of Existence - Siesta
- 6400 Crew Pres. Onionz + Halo - I Need Ya - Electriksoul
- Onionz + Joeski Pres. Barrio Bros. - Hold On To Your Love - Electriksoul
- Onionz + Joeski + Master D - Chango Musik - Electriksoul
- Onionz - Groove Predator - Camouflage
- Onionz + Master D + Tony - Right There - Electriksoul
- 6400 Crew Pres. Onionz + Tony - Cookin Up The Funk E.P. - Siesta
- Onionz + Tony - How's Ya Vibe - Shaboom
- Onionz + Master D - Celia's Groove - N.R.K.
- Onionz + Master D - T's Tango Electriksoul
- Onionz + Tony - Slightly Touched E.P. - Moody
- Onionz + Tony + Dano - Extreme Measures - Moody
- Onionz + Tony + Master D - Dano Brothers - Hand Low Pressing
- Onionz + Master D - Fading Memories - Doubledown Recordings
- 19Th Street Brothers - The Park E.P. - Electriksoul
- Dj Who + Onionz - Unlock Your Heart - Electriksoul
- Onionz + Master D - Infatuation Imperial Dub
- Onionz + Master D - Never Ending Journey - Electriksoul
- Onionz - E.T.I. Supreme Soul Team - Electriksoul
- Family - Say A Little Prayer - Electriksoul

=== Remixes ===
- Phuture - We Are Phuture (Onionz Remix) – Afro Acid
- Carl Cox - The Player (Onionz Remix) - Bush Records
- Nathan Barato - Dirty (Onionz Remix) - Root And Wings Music
- Halo Varga - Future (Onionz Remix) - Siesta Records
- Marc Pollen - Risky Life (Onionz Remix) - Siesta Records
- Alex Clavijo + Roger Arias - Ganguro - (Onionz Remix) - Uniform Recordings
- Soup A - Passion - Sullivan Room Records
- EMan + Doc Link - Hollow (Onionz Love Beth to Death Mix) - Liberate Recordings
- Dj Pierre - Masterblaster (Turn It Up) (Onionz Remix) - Bush Records
- Phonolulu - Nights Young (Onionz Remix) - BluFin
- Timo Garcia - Wonderlust Bug (Onionz Remix) - Berwick Street Records
- Ostrich - Go Down (Onionz Remix) - Mile End Records
- Jack Loves Robots - Anxsociety (Onionz Remix) - Silent Machine Recordings
- Joeski - Don't Stop (Onionz Remix) - Maya
- Jake Knights - Drench (Onionz Remix) - Influential House
- Negghead - Life (Onionz Remix) - Waxon Records
- Slok - Deesgustocosmicow (Onionz Remix) - Electronic Petz
- Nick + Danny Chatelain - Katrinyla (Onionz Remix) - Goanche
- Miss Honey Dijon Feat. Celeda - New Day (Onionz Chief Rocka Mix) - Mile End Records
- Dbr + David Ferrara Vs. Blaze - My Beat (Onionz Remix) - Play This! Records
- Timo Garcia - Boom (Onionz Remix) - Berwick St.
- Harada - I Came (Onionz Remix) - Blu Fin
- Cybersutra - I Believe (Onionz Remix) - Red Stick
- Levi - Another You (Onionz Remix) - Dirty Fabric
- Funk D Void - Genibra (Onionz Remix) - Soma
- The Idiotbox - Supermodel (Onionz Remix) - Dirty Fabric
- Jamie Anderson - Sunlight (Onionz Remix) - Om Records
- Mattheson - Blown (Onionz Remix) - Atlantic Standard Recordings
- Matt Rock - Night After Night (Onionz Remix) - Hardplace
- Refined.se - Swinging Kitten (Onionz Dub) - Frik:N:Frak
- Hawke - We Come From Far (Onionz Off The Radar Dub) - Eighth Dimension
- Rock N Hardplace - Night After Night (Onionz Remix) - Hardplace Recordings
- Drum Bums - The Idea (Onionz Dub) - Phonetic Recordings
- Blacksoul Feat. Rithma - Not Another Love Song (Onionz Remix) - Blacksoul Music
- Buick Project - Luminare (Onionz Rub) - Saved Records
- Dennis Ferrer - Sandcastles (Onionz Remix) - Defected
- Noel Nanton - Mongo Bongo (Onionz Remix) - N.R.K.
- Lee Cabrera - Shake It (Onionz + Master D Remix) - Credence
- Master H - Cest La Vie (Onionz Remix ) - Soma Recordings
- Technique - When There Is Love (Onionz Remix) - Downtown 161
- The Operator - (Onionz + Master D Remix) - Skyline Records
- Blakkat Feat. Tyra - Rite Place (Onionz Remix) - Shaboom
- Taka Boom - Groove Like That (Onionz Remix) - Shaboom
- Chris Simmonds - In My Soul (Onionz Remix) - Big Chief
- Rocket - People (Onionz + Master D's Doggy Style Dub) - Grayhound Recordings
- Kerri Chandler Feat. Roy Ayers - Good Vibrations (Onionz Remix) - Champion
- Sandy B - Make My World Go Round (Onionz Remix) - Champion
- Robin S. - Show Me Love (Onionz Remix) - Champion
- Raze - Break For Love (Onionz Remix) - Champion
- Earth People - Dance (Onionz Remix) - Champion
- Dano - The Crawl (Onionz + Master D Remix) - Red Melon
- Halo - Mi Casa (Onionz + Master D Remix) - Moody
- Soulstice - Lovely (Onionz + Master D Remix) - Om Records
- Mephisto Odyssey - The Lift (Onionz + Tony Remix) - Primal/Warner Bros.
- Dj Shorty - In Your Mind (Onionz + Master D Electrik Soul Brothers Mix) - ESP-SUN Records
- Felli + Buddy Exploding Fist (Onionz +Master D Remix) - Caffeine
