= DILF =

DILF may refer to:

- DILF, a slang acronym meaning "Dad/Daddy I'd Like to Fuck" (see "MILF")
- "DILFs: Dads I'd Like to Frock", an episode of RuPaul's Drag Race
- Diplôme Initial de Langue Française, an initial diploma in Français langue étrangère
