= Weight (song) =

Single by Latrice Royale featuring Epiphany Mattel
- Released: January 15, 2014
- Recorded: 2014
- Genre: Dance
- Length: 3:26
- Label: Lomlplex
- Songwriter(s): Michaelangelo Cosculluela
- Producer(s): Michaelangelo Cosculluela

"Weight" is the debut single released by American drag queen Latrice Royale. The single was released on January 15, 2014. The song plays with the homophones "weight" and "wait", revolving around the topics of food, hunger, and cravings. The track features a verse by rapper Epiphany Mattel.

== Background ==
Building off of his RuPaul's Drag Race season 4 success, Royale released a song with Manila Luzon called "The Chop" in 2012. While Luzon had gone on to release other tracks, Royale had not collaborated on any of the projects. On July 10, 2013, Drag Official released an interview with Royale where he stated he was working on a single that people would have to "W-E-I-G-H-T for..."

On January 15, 2014, Royale released the single, followed by an accompanying music video released in June. For the music video, Royale partnered with Michaelangelo Cosculluela, who acted as producer and editor on the project.

== Reception ==
Instinct Magazine described the song as a "high energy dance track [that] may not be everyone's flavor, but it's a fun departure from other contrived RPDR [RuPaul's Drag Race] alumnus music."

The song was positively reviewed by The Huffington Post, Logo TV, The Magic Critique, and The Embittered Queen, among others. RuPaul's Drag Race alum Pandora Boxx also positively reviewed the song, stating, "It’s funny, catchy and it’s got a good beat. It also manages to capture what we all loved about Latrice and that’s not always easy to do in a song."

Remixes of "Weight" have been mixed by artists Jared Jones, Lomlplex, Naked Highway, Joe Cole and David Patrilla. Rapper Jipsta appears on the remix by Jared Jones. Royale released a "Weight" remixed album with a collection of those remixes in June 2014.

== Charts ==
Chart (2015)	Peak position
US Comedy Digital Songs (Billboard)	13
