= DILFs: Dads I'd Like to Frock =

- RuPaul's Drag Race episode
- Episode no.: Season 4 Episode 10
- Presented by: RuPaul
- Original air date: April 2, 2012

Guest judges
- Jesse Tyler Ferguson; Jennifer Love Hewitt

Episode chronology
← Previous "Frock the Vote!"	Next → "The Fabulous Bitch Ball"
- RuPaul's Drag Race season 4

"DILFs: Dads I'd Like to Frock" is the tenth episode of the fourth season of the American television series RuPaul's Drag Race. It originally aired on April 2, 2012. The episode's main challenge tasks the contestants with giving makeovers to fathers. American actors Jesse Tyler Ferguson and Jennifer Love Hewitt are guest judges.

Phi Phi O'Hara wins the main challenge. Kenya Michaels, who was brought back to the competition by the judges, is elimination from the competition after placing in the bottom and losing a lip-sync contest against Latrice Royale to "(You Make Me Feel Like) A Natural Woman" by Aretha Franklin.

== Episode ==
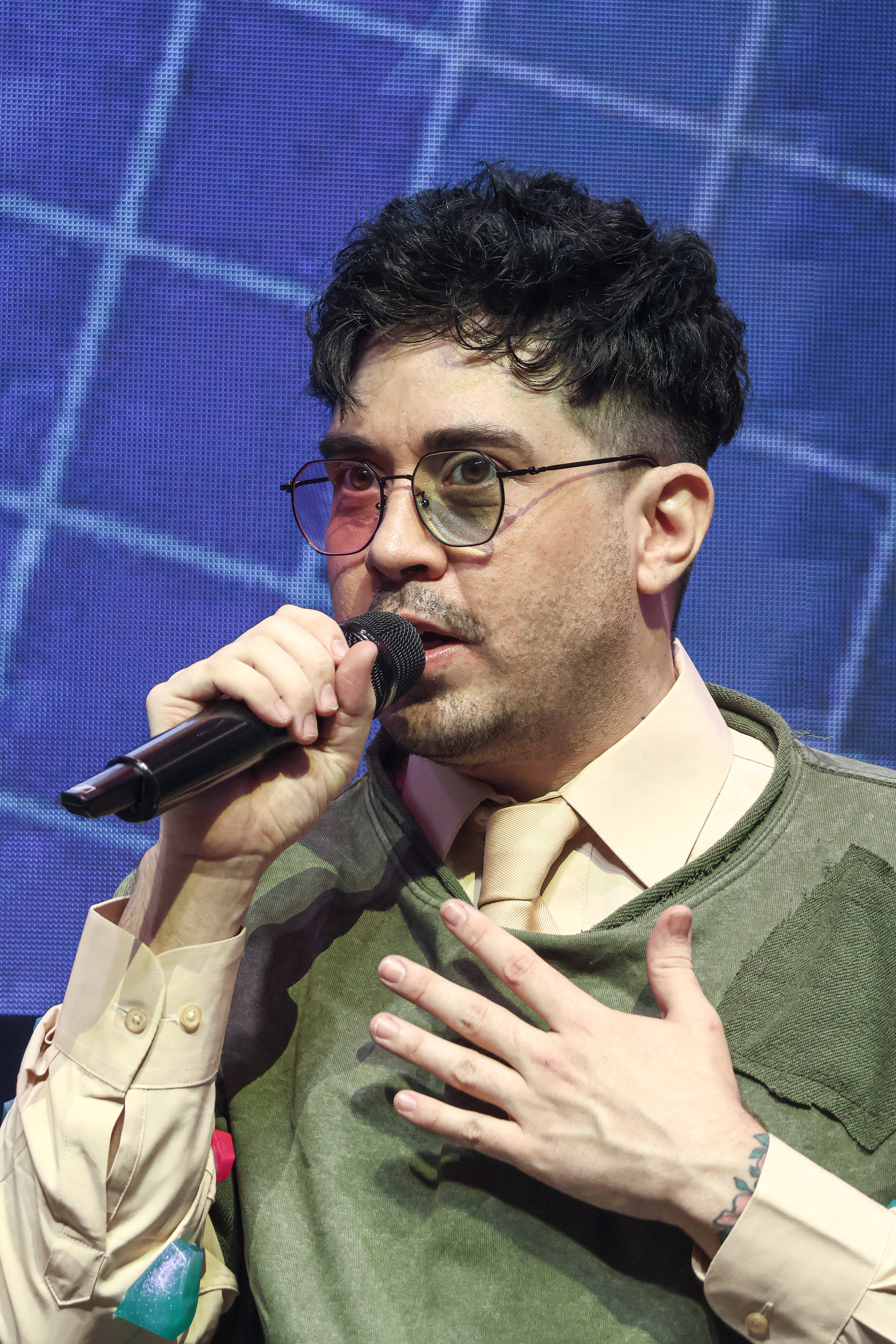
Phi Phi O'Hara (pictured in 2026) wins the episode's main challenge.

The contestants return to the workroom and read DiDa Ritz's mirror message. RuPaul greets the group and reveals that the judges have voted Kenya Michaels back into the competition. RuPaul then reveals the mini-challenge, which tasks the contestants with giving makeovers to teddy bears. Kenya Michaels is declared the winner of the mini-challenge. RuPaul also shares that the bears will be auctioned off to benefit the Matthew Shepard Foundation. RuPaul then invites five men into the workroom and reveals the main challenge, which tasks the contestants with giving makeovers to fathers (or "DILFs") to become pregnant "drag divas".

The pairs start to prepare for the main challenge. RuPaul returns to meet with each team, asking questions and offering advice. Before leaving, RuPaul reveals that Jesse Tyler Ferguson and Jennifer Love Hewitt are guest judges. RuPaul also reveals that each couple will need to perform a striptease. The pairs rehearse on the main stage. On elimination day, the pairs make final preparations in the workroom for the fashion show.

On the main stage, RuPaul welcomes fellow judges Michelle Visage and Santino Rice, as well as guest judges Ferguson and Hewitt. RuPaul shares the assignment of the main stage, then the stripteases and fashion show commence. After the pairs present their looks, the judges deliver their critiques, deliberate, then share the results with the group. Phi Phi O'Hara is declared the winner of the main challenge. Kenya Michaels and Latrice Royale place in the bottom and face off in a lip-sync contest to "(You Make Me Feel Like) A Natural Woman" (1967) by Aretha Franklin. Latrice Royale wins the lip-sync and Kenya Michaels is eliminated from the competition. Kenya Michaels returns to the workroom to write a message on the mirror for the remaining contestants.

== Production and broadcast ==
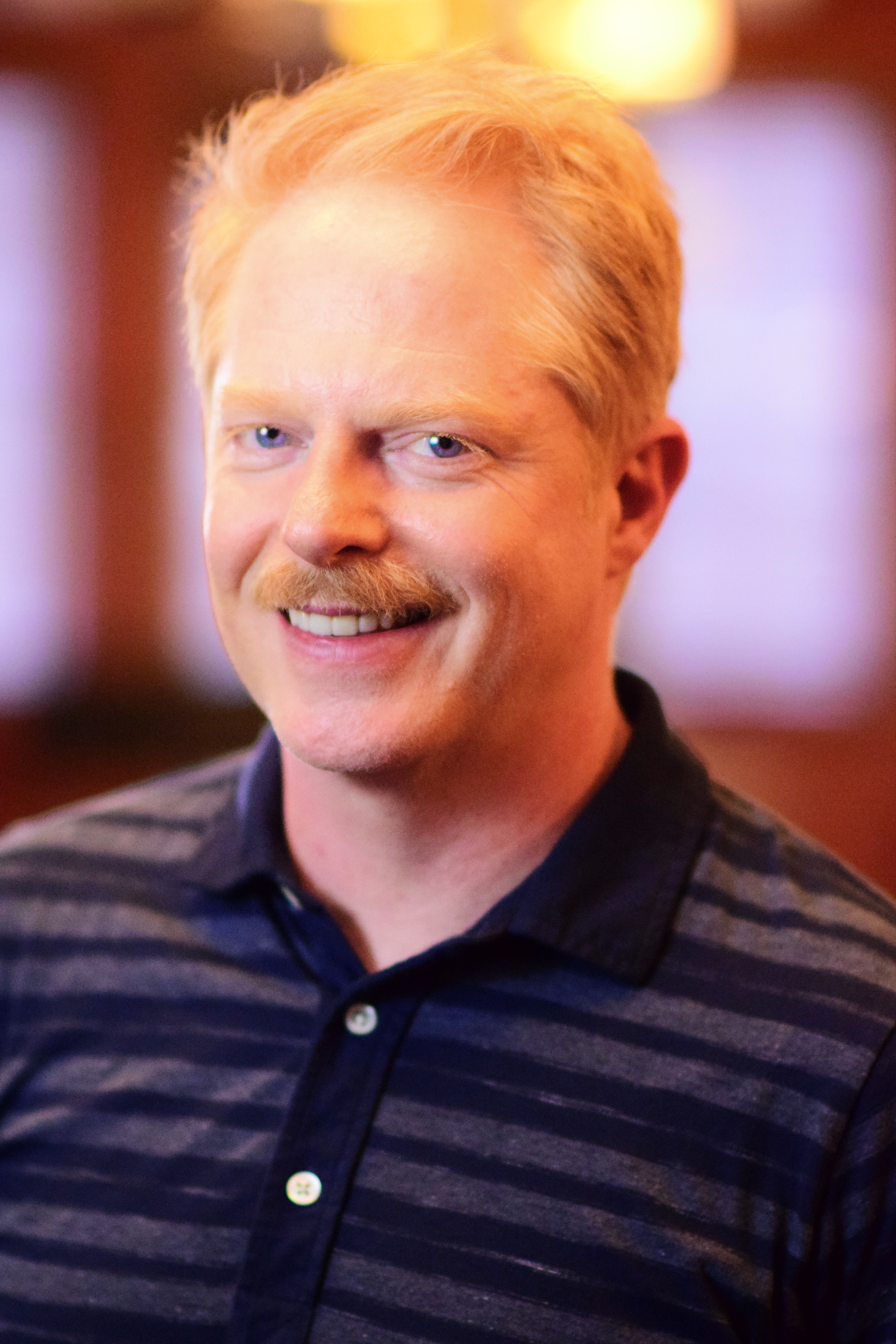
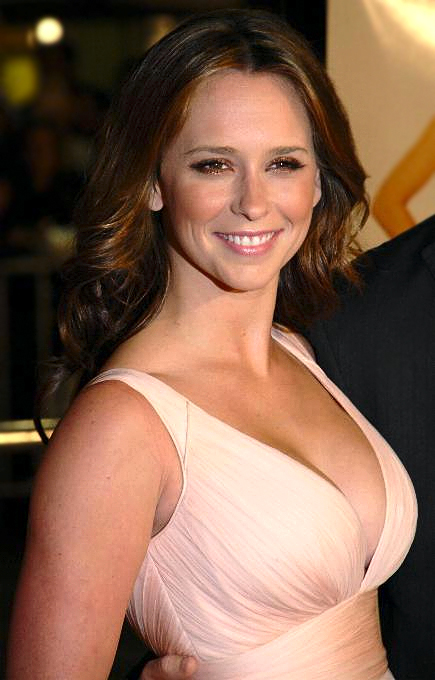
Jesse Tyler Ferguson (top) and Jennifer Love Hewitt (bottom) are guest judges.

The episode originally aired on April 2, 2012.

Shawn Morales is among members of the Pit Crew.

During the lip-sync contest, Kenya Michaels "kicked off a high energy ballet-esque routine, whirling across the stage with fierce and dramatic facial expressions and whipping arm gestures", according to The Standard. The newspaper's Ben Travis said Latrice Royale stood in place and "lived and breathed every word of the song, exuding style while gracefully moving her arms and belting out the iconic chorus". Kevin O'Keeffe of INTO Magazine said Hewitt "looks with pity at Kenya Michaels as she throws herself around the stage, totally missing the point of Aretha Franklin's song", while Ferguson "can’t stop glowing watching Latrice as she sings a gorgeous anthem of love to her unborn child".

=== Fashion ===
For the main stage, RuPaul wears a red dress and a large blonde wig. For the fashion show, Latrice Royale has a black-and-white dress and a dark wig. Her partner has a black-and-blue dress and a blonde wig. Phi Phi O'Hara has a pink-and-silver dress and a red wig. Her partner Gi Gi O'Hara has a similar turquoise dress and red wig. Kenya Michaels has a black-and-purple outfit and her partner Lil' Mama Michaels has a black-and-pink outfit. Sharon Needles has a dark dress and an eyepatch. Her partner Robin Mansions has a black-and-silver dress with black gloves and an eyepatch. Both have dark wigs. Chad Michaels and Lady Samatha have matching colorful outfits and blonde wigs.

== Reception ==
Oliver Sava of The A.V. Club gave the episode a rating of 'A-'. In 2019, Bernardo Sim of Screen Rant wrote, "The return of Kenya Michaels made sense. In hindsight, however, it is one of the weirdest (and shortest) comebacks for a queen on Drag Race ever."

Mikelle Street of Out magazine included Latrice Royale's performance in a 2020 list of nine lip-syncs on the show "that prove you don't need stunts and reveals", writing: "Kenya Michaels might have been dancing literal circles around Latrice Royale, but it honestly stood no chance. Royale, a veteran of performance stood in one spot and sang an ode to her unborn child bringing smiles to the judges' faces." In 2022, Stephen Daw of Billboard said Latice Royale's performance was memorial for its "emotional connection". Shannon Barbour included the contest in Cosmopolitan's 2024 overview of the show's best lip-syncs to date, writing: "There is literally no telling what Kenya was doing with those background acrobatics, but Latrice’s understated and powerful lip sync fully stole the show."
