= Turnt Up =

- Cover art

Studio album by Jipsta
- Released: 13 August 2013
- Genre: Dance, hip hop, Pop
- Label: Bandoozle Beatz
- Producer: Jipsta, Ranny, Tom Napack. John Rizzo, Mark VDH, Joey Cole, David Petrilla

Turnt Up is the second studio album by American rapper Jipsta.

== Overview ==
Turnt Up was released on 13 August 2013. The album contains 11 songs, including the singles "Lover Who Rocks You," "Abracadabra (Feat. Joe Thompson)," "Moombah Zoombah," and "Body Pop."

== Singles ==
"Lover Who Rocks You was the first single to be released from the album. Featuring vocals by Reina, "Lover Who Rocks You," was a cover of the 1990 version recorded by India. The version recorded by Jipsta and Reina reached #20 on the Billboard Dance Club Play chart, and was notable as this was the last song of Jipsta's to promoted to the Billboard DJ panel by legendary music industry promoter David Henney before his untimely passing in 2012. In interviews, Jipsta has credited David Henney as being instrumental in his success, with David not only becoming his unofficial manager, but also one of his mentors and closest friends.

"Abracadabra" was the second official single released from the album, and features vocals from Joe Thompson, the lead singer from NYC-based dance group Undercover. A remix package was released in November 2013, and plans for a video and tour were to begin taking shape in early 2014. While still in the planning stages, Jipsta was forced to cease all promotion and scheduled performances for the single and album when he was viciously attacked in the West 4th subway station on March 1, 2014.

Turnt Up also features the hit songs "Moombah Zoombah," and "Body Pop," the two songs on the album which were produced by Jipsta's friend and long-time musical collaborator, Ranny. "Body Pop" was promoted to the Billboard panel and was a huge success, peaking at #11 on the Billboard Dance Club Play Chart in 2014.

== Track listing ==
All tracks are written by Jipsta.

No.	Title	Length
1.	"Turnt Up"	1:12
2.	"Friend With Benefits"	4:35
3.	"Lover Who Rocks You (Feat. Reina)"	3:34
4.	"Abracadabra (Feat. Joe Thompson)"	4:04
5.	"Hate on Me"	3:53
6.	"Not Gonna Beg You"	4:16
7.	"The 1 That Got Away"	3:32
8.	"Stomp"	3:01
9.	"Moombah Zoombah"	3:15
10.	"Body Pop"	3:03
11.	"Other Guys"	3:09
