= Ban2oozle =

Studio album by Jipsta
- Released: January 6, 2017
- Recorded: 2016–2017
- Genre: Dance; hip hop; pop
- Length: 36:27
- Label: Bandoozle Beatz
- Producer: Chris Cox (DJ); Jipsta; Ranny

Singles from Ban2oozle
- 1. "Ban2oozle" Released: May 8, 2017

Ban2oozle is the third studio album by American rapper Jipsta. It was released on January 6, 2017 and debuted at #45 on the iTunes Top 200 chart in the first week of release, making it Jipsta's most successful album to date. "Ban2oozle" was submitted to (and accepted by) The Recording Academy as a potential nominee in the category of Grammy Award for Best Dance/Electronic Album.

The album contains 12 new songs, including the lead single "Ban2oozle". This is the first album that Jipsta has released since taking time off following a hate crime attack in 2014. On Twitter, Jipsta revealed that his voice had changed following the surgery required to his face.

== Track listing ==
All tracks are written by Jipsta.

No.	Title	Length
1.	"One Hunnit"	1:57
2.	"All Systems Go"	3:33
3.	"Hotel Motel"	2:39
4.	"Frequencies" (featuring Angelica Cox)	2:53
5.	"In One Ear, Out the Other"	2:35
6.	"Ban2oozle"	3:07
7.	"Breathe"	2:53
8.	"Explosive"	3:27
9.	"Last Night" (featuring Ranny & Pollo Del Mar)	3:23
10.	"Feel Like a Nut"	2:57
11.	"Vehicular"	3:15
12.	"Breezy"	3:51
