= Sandy B =

American singer

- Born: Sandra Barber
- Origin: New York City, U.S.
- Genre: House
- Occupation: Singer

Sandra Barber, known professionally as Sandy B, is an American house music singer from New York City.

== Career ==
She is primarily known for two of her solo records which reached #1 on Billboard's Dance/Club Play chart, "Make the World Go Round" and "Ain't No Need to Hide" in 1996, and 1997, respectively. Both songs were produced by the duo Deep Dish. Stonebridge (DJ) Onionz remixes of "Make the World Go Round" were also released.

In an unusual reversal of the conventional music industry success story, Sandy B had her #1 hits after leaving a major record label for an indie label. Though her two chart toppers were released on Champion Records, her debut #1 single "Feel Like Singin" had been released in 1992 on Nervous Records. She also released a single "Back Together" in 1994 on King Street Sounds.

After "Make the World Go Round" hit #1, Nervous included the David Morales remix of "Feel Like Singin" on the dance compilation album, 100% Pure Dance.

In 1998, Sandy B had an on-screen appearance in the movie Donnie Brasco, starring Al Pacino and Johnny Depp.

In 2000, and 2001, she had hits with singles released by the group Karmadelic, on which she performed the lead vocals. "Check It Out" reached #2 on the Hot Dance Music/Club Play, and "Nothingness" peaked at #10 on the Hot Dance Music/Club Play chart. Both songs secured moderate Rhythmic/Dance format airplay.

In 2003, she released a solo record "Lose Our Love" via the Junior Vasquez Music label, and it also saw the release of "Love Burns", written by Janice Robinson and produced by Stonebridge.

=== 2004–present ===
In 2004, she contributed vocals to the song "Medicine" which was credited to DJ Mike Cruz Presents China Ro & Sandy B, on Nervous Records, featuring remixes by Dezrok. The same year, she also released "The Beat Is Inside You", credited to DJ Exacta & Sandy B.

In 2005, Sandy co-wrote a song "Risen" with Janice Robinson, which went platinum in Belgium for the pop artist, Natalia. In 2006, her "Being True To Her Groove" was used in the Disney animation Kronk's New Groove.

In 2011, Sandy contributed vocals to the song "Party of the Year" which appears on the album Bandoozle by LGBTQ rapper Jipsta. The song was produced by Grammy nominated producer and remixer Chris Cox (DJ) and reached #10 on the Billboard Club Play chart.

== Discography ==
=== Albums ===
- Lose Our Love (2003)

=== Singles ===
Year	Song	U.S. Dance	UK Single	Album
1992	"Feel Like Singin'"	5	60	Feel Like Singin CD single
1996	"Make the World Go Round"	1	76	Make the World Go Round CD single
1996	"Back Together" (Urban Soul featuring Sandy B)	6	—	Back Together CD single
1997	"Make The World Go Round (Remix)	—	35	Make the World Go Round CD single
1997	"Ain't No Need to Hide"	1	60	Ain't No Need to Hide CD single
1998	"Make The World Go Round (2nd Remix)"	—	20	Make The World Go Round CD single
2000	"Check It Out"	2	—	Check It Out CD single
2001	"Nothingness"	10	—	
2001	"Alone" (Sal & Sandy B)	28	—	
2004	"Medicine"	—	—	
2004	"The Beat Is Inside You"	—	—	
2004	"Make The World Go Round 2004"	—	51	Make The World Go Round CD single

== See also ==
- List of number-one dance hits (United States)
- List of artists who reached number one on the US Dance chart
