= Urban Soul =

Urban Soul is a house music project assembled by producer Roland Clark. The project featured vocal contributions from Sandy B, Ceybil Jeffries, and Troyetta Knox.

Urban Soul scored a #1 hit on the US Hot Dance Music/Club Play chart in 1997 with the single “Show Me”. In the UK, the singles “Alright”, “Always”, and “Love Is So Nice” reached #34, #33, and #26 respectively on the UK Singles Chart.

== Biography ==
Urban Soul hit the US Hot Dance Music/Club Play chart seven times through the 1990s, including hitting #1 in 1997 with the track "Show Me." Other Urban Soul tracks featured vocals by Sandy B, Ceybil Jeffries and Troyetta Knox.

== Discography ==
=== Albums ===
- My Urban Soul (1996)

=== Singles ===
- “Show Me” (1997)
- “Love Is So Nice” (1996)
- “Alright” (1991)
- “Always” (1992)

== Chart performance ==
- “Show Me” – #1 US Hot Dance Music/Club Play
- “Alright” – #34 UK Singles Chart
- “Always” – #33 UK Singles Chart
- “Love Is So Nice” – #26 UK Singles Chart

== UK chart singles ==
- "Alright" (1991) – UK #60
- "Alright" (remix) (1991) – UK #43
- "Always" (1992) – UK #41
- "Love Is So Nice" (1998) – UK #75

== See also ==
- List of number-one dance hits (United States)
- List of artists who reached number one on the US Dance chart
