= Champion Records =

The name Champion Records has been used by at least four record labels:

- Champion Records (Richmond, Indiana, US), founded in Richmond, Indiana, US, and its successor label
- Champion Records (Nashville, Tennessee, US), a record label based in Nashville, US
- Champion Records (UK), a British record label
- Champion Records, a United States label distributed by Vee-Jay Records
