= Latrice Royale =

American drag queen (born 1972)

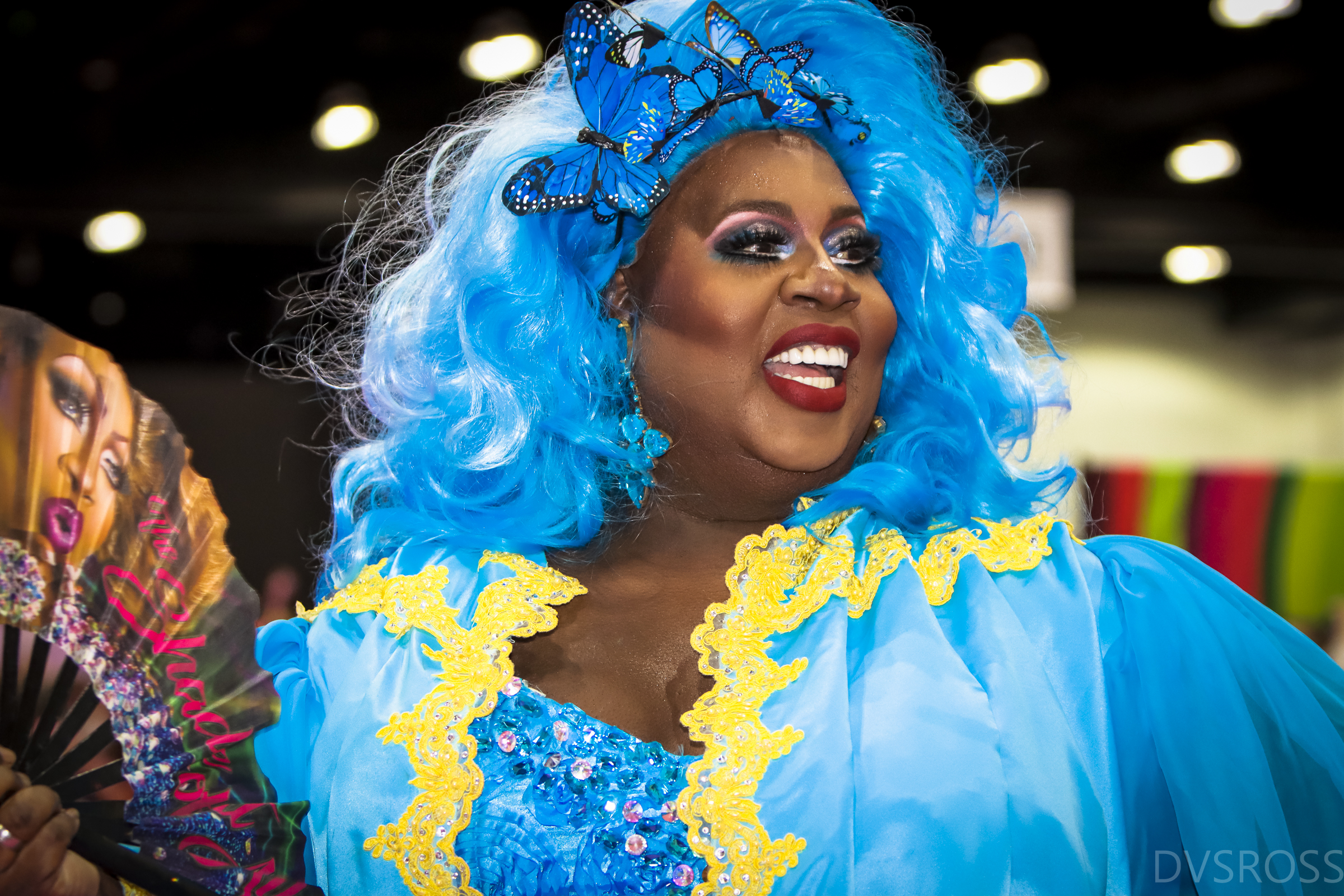
- Royale at the 2022 RuPaul's DragCon LA
- Born: Timothy K. Wilcots; February 12, 1972 (age 54); Torrance, California, U.S.
- Occupation: Drag performer
- Known for: RuPaul's Drag Race (season 4); RuPaul's Drag Race All Stars (season 1); RuPaul's Drag Race All Stars (season 4)
- Title: Miss Congeniality
- Predecessor: Yara Sofia
- Successor: Ivy Winters
- Spouse: Christopher Hamblin (m. 2018)
- Awards: RuPaul's Drag Race: Miss Congeniality 2012
- Website: latriceroyale.com

Timothy K. Wilcots (born February 12, 1972), better known by the stage name Latrice Royale, is an American drag queen, singer, character actress, and reality television personality. She is best known for her appearances on the fourth season of RuPaul's Drag Race in 2012 and on the first and fourth seasons of RuPaul's Drag Race All Stars. She finished in the Top 4 on her original season; in its final episode, she was crowned Miss Congeniality. She placed fifth on the fourth season of All Stars.

== Life and career ==
Wilcots was born in California and raised in Compton, a city in Greater Los Angeles. While growing up, he did not have a relationship with his father.

Royale's first foray into drag was dressing up as Wanda, a character from American sketch comedy show In Living Color, to amuse his friends. While in his twenties, in the mid-1990s, he performed in his first drag show: it was at the Copa Night Club in Fort Lauderdale, Florida. Her drag mother is Tiffany Arieagus.

After coming into the public eye, Wilcots was ordained as a minister. The first wedding that he performed was for his friend Daniel in upstate New York in 2013. Royale is a supporter of marriage equality, though he believes that it should not be called "gay marriage", stating, "It's a man and a man, and a woman and a woman getting married, and I think it is special and unique. So why not identify and celebrate it as something special and unique, and not lump it in with the same thing that has been going on for years?"

=== RuPaul's Drag Race Franchise ===
==== RuPaul's Drag Race season 4 ====
In May 2011, RuPaul's Drag Race, a drag competition produced as reality television, opened auditions for the show's fourth season; acting on a dare, Wilcots submitted an audition video. His audition was accepted, and he was cast for the show; production began later that year. The fourth season premiered on January 30, 2012. He ultimately placed fourth in the competition and was eliminated in the 11th episode, which aired on April 9, 2012. Viewers voted him Miss Congeniality, and he was crowned in the season finale. Royale competed as a "plus-size" queen. He competed against twelve other queens, including Sharon Needles, Phi Phi O'Hara, Willam Belli, and Cher impersonator Chad Michaels.

Royale made it into the top four—along with Needles, Michaels, and O'Hara—and won two challenges along the way, including when she acted in a mock sitcom in "Queens Behind Bars". When Royale was cut from the competition, Entertainment Weekly called the elimination "shocking". When he was eliminated, Royale said to show host RuPaul, "You have changed my life forever. You have changed the world of drag forever. I love you and respect you so much, and thank you for seeing something special in me. Thank you." Guest judges in attendance were Wynonna Judd and Rose McGowan; Royale's words brought tears to McGowan's eyes.

Sharon Needles won the crown for season 4. In the season finale, it was announced that Royale would appear on RuPaul's Drag U, which aired later that year. After winning a public fan vote, Royale was crowned as Miss Congeniality of season 4.

==== RuPaul's Drag Race All Stars season 1 ====
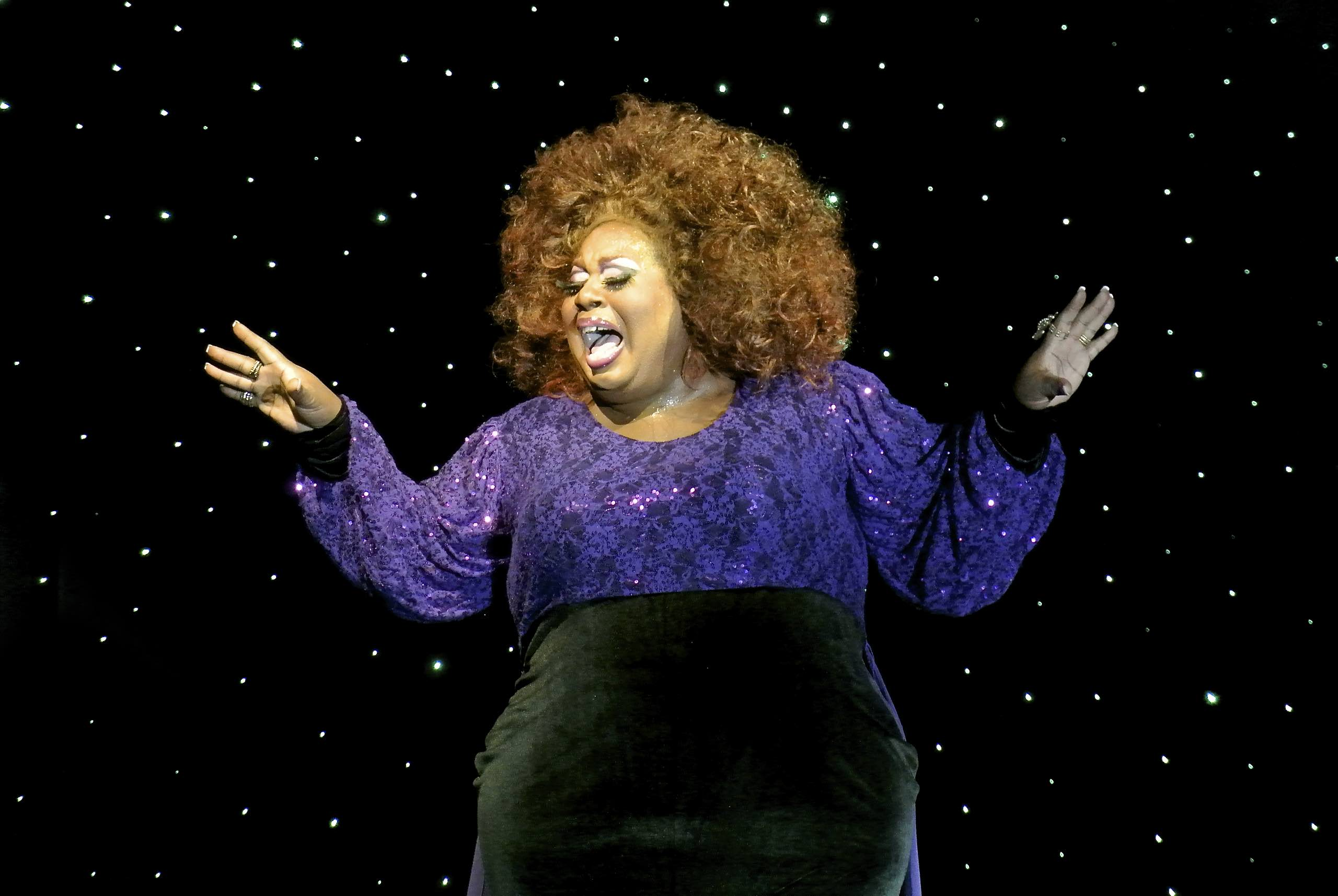
Royale performing in 2014

After RuPaul's Drag Race, Royale went on tour across the United States, performing at a number of different venues. When he had the opportunity to appear on RuPaul's Drag Race All Stars, Royale had to cancel tour dates to appear in the show.

For All Stars, Royale competed against Chad Michaels, Raven, Jujubee, Shannel, Alexis Mateo, Yara Sofia, Manila Luzon, Nina Flowers, Tammie Brown, Pandora Boxx, and Mimi Imfurst. For the competition, the queens were paired together, which was a departure from the rest of the RuPaul competitions where everyone competed alone. Royale and Luzon both chose to be together, and as a team they won the first challenge of the season.

On the third episode of the season, after not performing well with the street-punking challenge, Luzon and Jujubee faced off in the lip syncing challenge to represent each of their teams. Jujubee was paired with Raven. In the end, Royale and Luzon were sent home. During their elimination, RuPaul told them, "Manila and Latrice, my brainy and courageous queens. I think I’m going to miss you the most. Now, sashay away."

==== RuPaul's Drag U ====
In 2012, Royale joined the cast of RuPaul's Drag U for its third and final season. Other "professors" included JuJubee, Manila Luzon, Raja, Raven, Shannel, Alexis Mateo, Mariah, Chad Michaels, Willam, Morgan McMichaels, Pandora Boxx, Delta Work, and Sharon Needles.

==== RuPaul's Drag Race All Stars season 4 ====
In November 2018, Royale was announced as a cast member for All Stars 4, joining fellow All Stars season 1 cast member Manila Luzon for their second All Stars competition; the pair are the first Drag Race alumni to compete on two All Stars seasons. They are also the second and third contestants to compete on three separate seasons of the show (excluding specials) following Shangela Laquifa Wadley. Royale was originally eliminated fourth, sent home by Mo Heart, but was brought back into the competition during the LalapaRuza episode. After her elimination she won episode seven and eliminated Valentina from the competition. In the subsequent episode, she was saved from elimination by Naomi Smalls. Royale was eliminated again in episode nine by Trinity the Tuck, ultimately placing fifth overall.

==== RuPaul's Drag Race Holi-slay Spectacular and RuPaul's Drag Race Live Untucked ====
In December 2018, Royale competed in the Drag Race television special RuPaul's Drag Race Holi-slay Spectacular. She appears in RuPaul's Drag Race Live Untucked (2024).

=== Other performances ===
In January 2014, Royale released her debut single "Weight", which was endorsed by Logo TV. A remix EP was released in March that year. Later that year in September 2014, Royale introduced and then performed with Jennifer Hudson at the CBS Fashion Rocks charity fundraiser event. Hudson stated that working with Royale "Gave me life."

As of 2014, Royale works at the Palace Bar in South Beach, Florida. Of working there, Royale stated, "I love this place NOT because I work there, but because it is the Ultimate Experience.. It’s outside right on the Beach. Beautiful People, Great Food/Drinks and the Drag Shows are amazing!"

In 2016, Royale appeared alongside Peaches Christ and RuPaul's Drag Race alum Willam in Mister Act, an off-Broadway gender-flipped parody of the film Sister Act.

In March 2016, Royale released her EP, Here's to Life: Latrice Royale Live in the Studio. In 2018 and 2019, Royale took Here's to Life on tour and performed her Shirley Horn-inspired act in cities across Canada and the United States.

In April 2020, amid the coronavirus pandemic, Royale was announced as a featured cast member for the very first Digital Drag Fest, an online drag festival for all ages, with attendees given opportunities to interact with the artists, tip them, and win prizes during the broadcast. In June 2019, a panel of judges from New York magazine placed Royale tenth on their list of "the most powerful drag queens in America", a ranking of 100 former RuPaul's Drag Race contestants.

In September 2022, Latrice Royale headlined the Life Is Beautiful Music & Art Festival comedy lineup.

== Personal life ==
In 2001, Wilcots was arrested in Fort Lauderdale, Florida on felony charges for carrying marijuana and clonazepam without a prescription. In 2006, he missed a mandatory probation meeting, violating the terms of his probation, and was sentenced to eighteen months in prison. After the passage of 2018 Florida Amendment 4, Wilcots regained his right to vote.

Wilcots proposed to Christopher Hamblin in June 2016. The couple were married in Atlanta, Georgia on September 29, 2018. Attendees included Drag Race alumni and other drag performers. Wilcots expresses interest in spirituality.

== Discography ==
=== EPs ===
Title	Details
The Chop Remixes	Released: December 26, 2012; Label: N/A; Formats: Digital download
Weight Remixes	Released: March 20, 2014; Label: LOMLPLEX; Formats: Digital download
Here's to Life: Latrice Royale Live in the Studio	Released: March 10, 2016; Label: LRI Talent & Management; Formats: CD, Digital download

=== Singles ===
Title	Year	Peak chart positions	Album
Title	Year	US Comedy Digital	Album
"The Chop" (with Manila Luzon)	2012	—	Non-album single
"Weight" (featuring Epiphany Mattel)	2014	13	Non-album single
"Excuse the Beauty" (featuring Epiphany Mattel)	2018	—	Non-album single

=== Other appearances ===
Title	Year	Other Artist(s)	Album
"Thick Thighs"	2015	Willam Belli	Shartistry in Motion
"Oral"	2018	Willam Belli	Now That's What I Call Drag Music, Vol. 1
"Don't Funk It Up"	2018	RuPaul, Gia Gunn, Manila Luzon, Valentina, Trinity the Tuck	Non-album Single
"Robbed"	2019	Manila Luzon	Rules!

== Filmography ==
=== Television ===
Year	Title	Role	Notes	References
2012–2016	RuPaul's Drag Race	Herself (Contestant)	Season 4: 4th Place; Guest Appearances in Seasons 5–8	
2012	RuPaul's Drag Race: Untucked	Herself	Season 4	
2012	RuPaul's Drag U	Herself (Professor)	3 episodes	
2012, 2018–2019	RuPaul's Drag Race All Stars	Herself (Contestant)	Season 1: 7/8th Place; Season 4: 5th Place	
2014	Fashion Rocks	Herself	Television concert special	
2018	RuPaul's Drag Race Holi-Slay Spectacular	Herself (Contestant)	Holiday Special	
2018–2021	Drag Tots	Lady Liber-T		
2020	AJ and the Queen	Fabergé Legs	Guest appearance; also creative consultant	
2020	Celebrity Family Feud	Herself	Guest contestant	
2021	RuPaul's Drag Race: All Stars	Lady Liber-T from Drag Tots	Season 6, Episode: "Drag Tots"	
2023	Drag Me to Dinner	Herself	Hulu original	
2024	We're Here	Herself	HBO Original	
2024	Everybody Still Hates Chris	Drag queen (voice)	Episode: "Everybody Still Hates Bullies"	
2025	RuPaul's Drag Race	Herself	Special guest; Season 17, Episode: "How's Your Headliner?"	
2025	Super Duper Bunny League	Derek (voice)	Main role	

=== Music videos ===
Year	Title	Artist	Ref.
2012	"Responsitrannity"	RuPaul	
2020	"Always"	Waze & Odyssey	
2021	"Friends in Low Places"	Ginger Minj	

=== Film ===
Year	Title	Role	Notes	Ref
2009	My Baby's Daddies	Shay	Short	
2014	South Beach on Heels	Herself	Documentary	
2015	TupiniQueens	Herself	Documentary about Drag scene in Brazil	
2015	Gays in Prison	Herself (Host)	Documentary	
2017	Cherry Pop	Terry		
2017	Marabou	Marabou	Short	
2018	A Queen for the People	Herself	Documentary about Bob the Drag Queen	
2019	Trixie Mattel: Moving Parts	Herself	Documentary about Trixie Mattel	
2019	Wig	Herself	Documentary	
2021	The Bitch Who Stole Christmas	The Spirit of Christmas		
2023	Remember It's Christmas	Gregory/Marjorie	Short	
2026	Stop! That! Train!	Barbra		

=== Theatre ===
Year	Title	Role	Theatre	Ref(s)
2020	Death Drop	Summer Raines	Garrick Theatre	
2024	Little Shop of Horrors	Audrey II	Ogunquit Playhouse	

=== Web series ===
Year	Title	Role	Notes	Ref
2009	My Baby's Daddies	Shay	Online short, Makeup effects artist	
2013	Ring My Bell	Herself	Guest, Episode: "Latrice Royale"	
2015, 2018	Hey Qween!	Herself	Guest (2 episodes: "Latrice Royale" "DragCon L.A. 2018", )	
2015	Raja Drawja	Herself	Guest	
2016	Transformations	Herself	(Episode: Latrice Royale)	
2018	Drag Tots	Lady Liber-T (voice)	8 episodes	
2018	Pardon My French Food	Herself	Recurring	
2019	Werq The World	Herself	Featured Queen	
2019-2020	Hey Qween! Pride	Herself	Guest; 2 episodes	
2021	The Pit Stop	Herself	Guest, Episode: "Trixie Mattel & Latrice Royale Kiki"	
2022	Out of the Closet	Herself	Guest, Episode: "Latrice Royale: Bold and Beautiful Drag"	
2023	Give It To Me Straight	Herself	Guest	

== Awards and nominations ==
Year	Award giving body	Category	Work	Results	Ref.
2020	The Queerties	Drag Royalty	Herself	Nominated	
2023	Peabody Awards	Entertainment	We're Here	Won	
