= Power (Alex Newell EP) =

EP by Alex Newell
- Released: February 19, 2016
- Recorded: 2014–16
- Genre: Dance; Electronic
- Length: 18:00
- Label: Big Beat
- Producer: MNEK; LDN Noise; Freshup & Harley; Red Triangle; Digital Farm Animals

Singles from Power
- 1. "Nobody to Love" Released: May 20, 2014; 2. "This Ain't Over" Released: January 14, 2016; 3. "Basically Over You (B.O.Y.)" Released: March 28, 2016

Power (stylized as POWER) is the debut extended play (EP) by American actor and singer Alex Newell. It was released on February 19, 2016, by Big Beat Records. It charted at No. 11 on the Billboard Heatseekers Albums chart on 12 March 2016.

== Background ==
In late 2014, Newell featured in the last series of American television series Glee and was soon after signed to Big Beat Records. Shortly afterwards their signing, they released their debut single, a cover Sigma's song "Nobody to Love". The track was primarily conducted and produced by Nile Rodgers.

In March 2015, Newell collaborated with several artists. They featured on Clean Bandit's last single from their 2015 debut album New Eyes alongside Sean Bass, entitled "Stronger". The song was originally intended to have Olly Alexander, until the group replaced him for the official version with Bass and Newell. They also featured on The Knocks' "Collect My Love", which formed part of their 2015 extended play So Classic and later their 2016 debut album 55. The third feature they did was with electro duo Blonde, on their single "All Cried Out".

They also released their second single within that same month, which was a cover of Robin S.' single "Show Me Love". It was produced by and released in collaboration with Russian DJ Matvey Emerson. Later after the single was released, they began working behind the scenes with DJ Cassidy, Nile Rodgers and Jess Glynne on the song "Kill the Lights". It was recorded for the 2016 HBO TV series Vinyl. This sparked Newell's interest into producing their debut extended play with the collaborators.

In the end of 2015, Newell released a cover of "O Come, All Ye Faithfull", which was released for the 2015 Christmas holiday.

In January 2016, Newell revealed their debut extended play under the title Power and that it would be released on February 19, 2016. They also revealed the new single from the EP, entitled "This Ain't Over".

When the extended play was released, they made all of the other songs from the extended play available on their YouTube channel. During its post-release phase, they released their third single from the EP, entitled "Basically Over You (B.O.Y.)"on March 28, 2016, which eventually concluded the extended play's era. Newell soon embarked on an American tour as a guest act with Adam Lambert, performing some of the songs from their extended play.

== Track listing ==
No.	Title	Writer(s)	Producer(s)	Length
1.	"This Ain't Over"	Andrew Jackson; Greg Bonnick; Hayden Chapman	LDN Noise	3:29
2.	"Shame"	George Tizzard; Karen Harding; Rick Parkhouse; Tom Aspaul	Red Triangle	3:56
3.	"Basically Over You (B.O.Y.)"	Uzoechi Emenike	MNEK	4:00
4.	"Devilish" (with Digital Farm Animals)	Nicholas James Gale; Ollie Green	Digital Farm Animals	3:45
5.	"Nobody to Love"	Anton Friskopp; John Harleman	Freshup & Harley	3:25
Total length:				18:00
