= Alex Newell =

American actor and singer (born 1992)

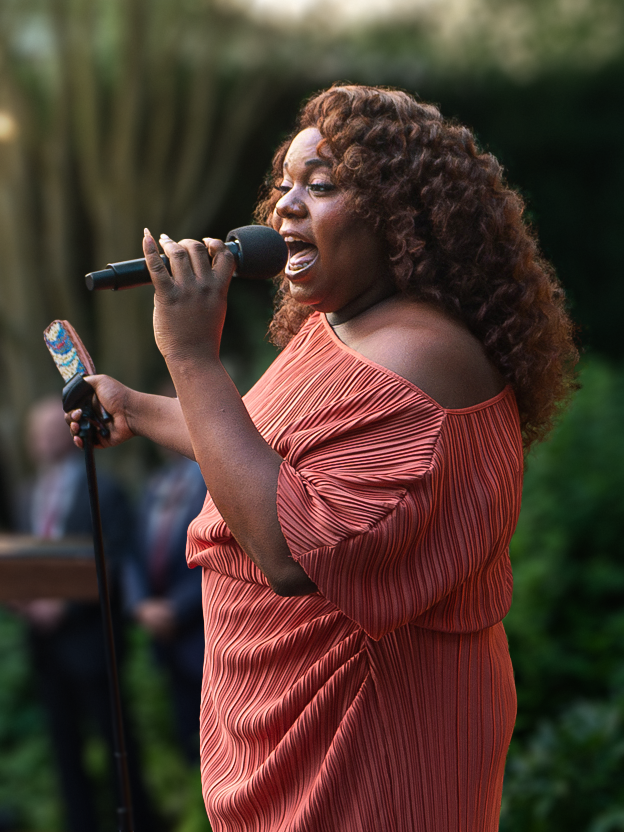
- Newell in 2026
- Born: Alex Eugene Newell; August 20, 1992 (age 34); Lynn, Massachusetts, U.S.
- Occupations: Actor; singer
- Years active: 2009–present
- Musical career
- Genres: R&B; pop; soul; house; disco
- Label: Big Beat Records

Alex Eugene Newell (born August 20, 1992) is an American actor and singer. They (Note: Newell uses all pronouns. This article uses they/them for consistency.) are known for their role as Unique Adams on the Fox musical series Glee and Mo on Zoey's Extraordinary Playlist. Newell also starred as Asaka in the Broadway revival of Once on This Island at the Circle in the Square Theatre in 2018. For their role in Shucked, Newell won the 2023 Tony Award for Best Featured Actor in a Musical. Newell and J. Harrison Ghee were the first openly non-binary actors to be nominated for and win the Tony Award.

As a singer, Newell has released tracks with Clean Bandit, Blonde, and The Knocks.

== Early life ==
Alex Newell was born on August 20, 1992, in Lynn, Massachusetts. Newell's father, a deacon, died of cancer when they were six years old, and Newell was subsequently raised by their single parent mother.

After four years of education in the first class of Kipp Lynn Academy, Newell moved on to and graduated from Bishop Fenwick High School in 2012, where they were involved with the school's choir, improv club, and costume club. Newell was also a member of the church choir at Zion Baptist Church in Lynn, Massachusetts, later also directing the youth choir. Newell had no formal voice lessons before working on Glee, and has credited Donna Summer, Sylvester, Diana Ross, Aretha Franklin, Chaka Khan, and Beyoncé as influences.

== Career ==
=== 2011–2014: Glee ===
Newell was among 34,000 to submit an audition video in 2011 for the first season of Oxygen's The Glee Project. Newell's self-taped audition earned over one million MySpace views as well as a spot among the 12 participants who competed for a seven-episode arc on Glee. During the arc, they self-identified as an out gay man. Eventually, they became the series’ first runner-up. Nevertheless, the producers were so impressed that they decided to bring them on Glee for two episodes. Newell first appeared on Glee in the third season episode "Saturday Night Glee-ver". They were cast in the role of Wade "Unique" Adams, a transgender teenager who was assigned male at birth. The shy, outcast Wade expressed their female identity through music as the bold, brave alter ego, Unique. Wade broke ground by being one of the most visible transgender characters on television and one of the first on a network prime time show. Newell's performance was described as "bold", with "remarkable restraint and powerful vocals."

On his nightly show The O'Reilly Factor, Bill O'Reilly expressed concern that children watching the show unsupervised might be encouraged to experiment with what he termed "alternative lifestyles," which he said the show glorified. Newell commented, "My mother said, 'If Bill O'Reilly said something about you, you are doing something right.' He just showed the public and conservative viewers me. There are more people seeing me now... There are people like Wade and Unique, and [they're] being themselves. If kids want to go and do that, that is them expressing who they are." They later appeared in two more episodes and completed their story arc that season.

Newell was accepted into the Berklee College of Music for fall 2012, but decided instead to move to Los Angeles to be on Glee when they were asked to rejoin the cast for the show's fourth season. Unique returned as a Glee recurring cast member in the fourth season premiere, "The New Rachel". Newell, along with the rest of the cast, received a nomination for a Screen Actors Guild Award for Outstanding Performance by an Ensemble in a Comedy Series in 2012, but lost to Modern Family at the 19th Screen Actors Guild Awards. For the fifth season, Newell was promoted to the main cast because of the character Unique's popularity. In the sixth and final season, Newell was not a part of the regular cast, but did appear as a recurring guest star. A highlight of the sixth season was Newell singing "I Know Where I've Been" from Hairspray with the Transpersons Choir of 200 performers in the episode "Transitioning".

=== 2014–2016: Music career and Power EP ===
Over the years, Newell sang at numerous events, such as the Coachella Festival, but also at many LGBT events and pride festivals. They also performed at the Governors Ball Music Festival and BBC Radio 1's Big Weekend.

Newell announced in October 2013 that they had been signed by Big Beat Records and that they were going to release Newell's debut album. It was also revealed that it was going to be produced by Adam Anders. Their debut single, a cover of Sigma's "Nobody to Love", was released on June 3, 2014.

In 2015, Newell embarked on a series of cover songs and collaborations. In March, they alongside Sean Bass provided feature vocals for the re-issued version of "Stronger", a song by Clean Bandit for their re-release of their album New Eyes. Later in the same month, they produced a disco-house stylization of Robin S.'s single "Show Me Love" together with Russian DJ Matvey Emerson. Over the summer, they worked with the British electro duo Blonde by featuring vocals in their single "All Cried Out". They then began to collaborate with the US electro duo the Knocks on the song "Collect My Love", "a soaring disco standout" where they reached "staggering heights." The song, from the EP So Classic, was included in The Knocks' debut album 55, released in March 2016. Finally, for Christmas, Newell released a cover of the song "O Come All Ye Faithful".

Their original song "This Ain't Over", released in January 2016, was warmly welcomed by the media. Out commented: "The vibrant dance-pop track flawlessly revives disco if only for a few short minutes. Without the gimmicks of manufactured radio pop, Newell manages to serve This Ain't Over with pure talent." Spin said: "Newell's unassailable voice is in full force on 'This Ain't Over,' shining out like a triumphant beacon over a thumping, glamorous dance-pop soundscape." Vulture concluded: "This is just diva vocal acrobatics flexed with the swag of a queen."

"This Ain't Over" was announced as the first track off their debut extended play called Power, featuring production from the pop artists Diane Warren, Nile Rodgers, MNEK and DJ Cassidy. The EP was released on February 19, 2016, via Big Beat.

Newell supported fellow Glee alum Adam Lambert on The Original High Tour from February 23 until the April 2 finale at Los Angeles’ Orpheum Theatre in 2016. After the tour, Newell recorded a new single in collaboration with Power producers DJ Cassidy and Nile Rodgers, entitled "Kill the Lights", released on April 8, 2016, through Atlantic Records. It was expected to be one of a few tracks that Newell was making as part of the HBO TV series Vinyl. It was later revealed that the song had been recorded the previous year when Newell was working with Clean Bandit, Blonde and the Knocks, and inspired the producers to work with them on their debut extended play. Later that same month, the song was released again, featuring vocals from Jess Glynne.

=== 2016–present: Debut album, Once on This Island, Zoey's Extraordinary Playlist, and Shucked ===
In 2017, Newell made their Broadway debut playing the role of Asaka in the revival of Once on This Island.

In 2019, Newell was cast in NBC's musical dramedy Zoey's Extraordinary Playlist in the role of Mo, a genderfluid DJ and the protagonist Zoey Clarke (Jane Levy)'s next-door neighbor. In June 2021, the series was canceled by NBC after two seasons. In December 2021, The Roku Channel released a two-hour holiday film, Zoey's Extraordinary Christmas, concluding the story of the NBC series. Newell reprised their role of Mo for the film.

In 2023, Newell premiered in the role of Lulu in the musical comedy Shucked on Broadway in the Nederlander Theatre. The show opened April 4, 2023, and ran through January 14, 2024. In June 2023, they won a Tony Award for Best Featured Actor in a Musical for their performance in the role at the 76th Tony Awards. They and J. Harrison Ghee for Some Like It Hot were the first openly non-binary actors to be nominated for and win a Tony Award.

In 2024, Newell performed their solo concert debut at Cadogan Hall in London, UK on September 1, 2024, for two performances. These concerts featured a guest appearance from Marisha Wallace.

=== Other work and awards ===
Newell played the title role in NBC's comedy pilot Imaginary Friend, which was expected to air in 2016. It was passed on and no other network picked it up so it did not air. They contributed with music to the HBO TV series Vinyl on a track also featuring DJ Cassidy and Jess Glynne.

They are committed to helping other LGBT youth and regularly performs at benefit concerts, most notably for The Trevor Project, the Human Rights Campaign, Jack Antonoff's Ally Coalition and other fundraisers.

Newell was given a special recognition award at the 2015 GLAAD Media Awards, as part of the cast of Glee.

== Personal life ==
Newell is gender nonconforming, and in May 2020 said they relate to their character Mo in Zoey's Extraordinary Playlist, who is genderfluid. Newell has said they go by all pronouns, and identifies as gay.

== Discography ==
Alex Newell discography
- Extended plays: 1
- Soundtrack albums: 8
- Singles: 14

=== EPs ===
List of albums, with selected information
| Title | Album details | Peak chart positions | |
| Title | Album details | US Dance/ Electronic | US Heat |
|---|---|---|---|
| Power | Released: February 19, 2016; Label: Atlantic Records; Formats: digital download | 4 | 11 |

=== Singles ===
==== As lead artist ====
| Title | Year | Peak chart positions | | Album |
| Title | Year | US Dance/ Electronic | US Dance Club | Album |
|---|---|---|---|---|
| "Nobody to Love" | 2014 | — | — | Power |
| "Show Me Love" (with Matvey Emerson) | 2015 | — | — | Non-album single |
| "O Come, All Ye Faithful" | 2015 | — | — | Tyler Oakley's Holiday Jams |
| "This Ain't Over" | 2016 | — | — | Power |
| "Basically Over You (B.O.Y.)" | 2016 | — | — | Power |
| "Kill the Lights" (with DJ Cassidy and Jess Glynne featuring Nile Rogers) | 2016 | 15 | 1 | Vinyl: The Essentials (Best of Season 1) |
| "Need Somebody" | 2016 | — | — | Non-album singles |
| "Keep It Moving" | 2016 | — | — | Non-album singles |
| "O Come All Ye Faithful" (Volac Remix) | 2016 | — | — | Non-album singles |
| "As I Am" (with Bryan Adams featuring Matt Kelly) | 2019 | — | — | Non-album singles |
| "Boy, You Can Keep It" | 2020 | — | 41 | Non-album singles |
| "Mama Told Me" | 2020 | — | — | Non-album singles |
| "Attitude" | 2022 | — | — | Non-album singles |
| "Independently Owned" | 2023 | — | — | Shucked (Original Broadway Cast Recording) |
| "Out Of Sight" (with Discrete) | 2025 | — | — | Non-album singles |
| "Tell Me Why" (with Cole Dow Jones) | 2026 | — | — | Non-album singles |

==== As featured artist ====
| Title | Year | Peak chart positions | | | | | | | | | | Certifications | Album |
| Title | Year | US Dance/ Electronic | US Dance Club | BEL (FL) | BEL (Wa) | HUN | IRE | JAP | SCO | UK | UK Dance | Certifications | Album |
|---|---|---|---|---|---|---|---|---|---|---|---|---|---|
| "Stronger" (uncredited) (Clean Bandit featuring Alex Newell and Sean Bass) | 2015 | — | — | — (Note: "Stronger" did not enter the Ultratop 50, but peaked at number 79 on the Flemish Ultratip chart.) | — | 37 | 56 | 80 | 3 | 4 | 1 | BPI: Silver | New Eyes (Special Edition) |
| "All Cried Out" (Blonde featuring Alex Newell) | 2015 | — | — | 59 | 82 | — | 74 | — | 4 | 4 | 1 | BPI: Gold | non-album single |
| "Collect My Love" (The Knocks featuring Alex Newell) | 2015 | — | — | — | — | — | — | — | — | — | — | | 55 |
| "Hands" (with various artists) | 2016 | — | — | — | | — | — | — | — | — | — | | Non-album singles |
| "Rescue Me" (DJ D-Sol featuring Alex Newell) | 2019 | 31 | 4 | — | — | — | — | — | — | — | | | Non-album singles |
| "Higher" (Vincint and Princess Precious featuring Alex Newell) | 2021 | — | — | — | | — | — | — | — | — | — | | There Will Be Tears |

=== Soundtrack album appearances ===
- Glee: The Music, The Christmas Album Volume 2 (2011; 20th Century Fox, Columbia)
- Glee: The Music, The Complete Season 3 (2012; 20th Century Fox, Columbia)
- Glee: The Music, The Complete Season 4 (2013; 20th Century Fox, Columbia)
- Glee Sings the Beatles (2013; 20th Century Fox, Columbia)
- Polkadots: The Cool Kids Musical (World Premiere Cast Recording) (2016; Sony)
- Once On This Island (New Broadway Cast Recording) (2018; Broadway)
- Music From Zoey's Extraordinary Christmas (Original Motion Picture Soundtrack) (2021; Lakeshore)
- Shucked (Original Broadway Cast Recording) (2023; Haystack on Broadway, Masterworks Broadway)
- Hazbin Hotel: Season Two (Original Soundtrack) (2025)

=== Soundtrack EP appearances ===
- Britney 2.0 (2012; 20th Century Fox, Columbia)
- Glee: The Music Presents Glease (2012; 20th Century Fox, Columbia)
- A Katy or a Gaga (Music from the Episode) (2013; 20th Century Fox, Columbia)
- Glee: The Music, The Christmas Album Volume 4 (2013; 20th Century Fox, Columbia)
- Glee: The Music, City of Angels (2013; 20th Century Fox, Columbia)
- Glee: The Music, Transitioning (2014; 20th Century Fox, Columbia)
- Zoey's Extraordinary Playlist: Season 1, Episode 4 (Music From the Original TV Series) (2020; Lionsgate, Republic)
- Zoey's Extraordinary Playlist: Season 1, Episode 7 (Music From the Original TV Series) (2020; Lionsgate, Republic)
- Zoey's Extraordinary Playlist: Season 1, Episode 11 (Music From the Original TV Series) (2020; Lionsgate, Republic)
- Zoey's Extraordinary Playlist: Season 1, Episode 12 (Music From the Original TV Series) (2020; Lionsgate, Republic)
- Zoey's Extraordinary Playlist: Season 2, Episode 2 (Music From the Original TV Series) (2021; Lionsgate)
- Zoey's Extraordinary Playlist: Season 2, Episode 6 (Music From the Original TV Series) (2021; Lionsgate)
- Zoey's Extraordinary Playlist: Season 2, Episode 9 (Music From the Original TV Series) (2021; Lionsgate)
- Zoey's Extraordinary Playlist: Season 2, Episode 10 (Music From the Original TV Series) (2021; Lionsgate)
- Zoey's Extraordinary Playlist: Season 2, Episode 12 (Music From the Original TV Series) (2021; Lionsgate)

== Acting credits ==
=== Film ===
| Year | Title | Role | Notes |
|---|---|---|---|
| 2013 | Geography Club | Ike | |
| 2013 | Platypus the Musical | Tatiana | Short film |
| 2016 | Super Novas | Brie Tonika | |
| 2020 | For Christmas Sake | Themself | Short film |
| 2023 | Pacemaker | Cody | Short film |
| 2025 | Another Simple Favor | Vicky | |

=== Television ===
| Year | Title | Role | Notes |
|---|---|---|---|
| 2011 | The Glee Project | Contestant (Themself) | Runner-up |
| 2012–2015 | Glee | Wade "Unique" Adams | Main cast (39 episodes) |
| 2015 | Resident Advisors | Morgan | 2 episodes |
| 2016 | Imaginary Friend | Sam | Television pilot |
| 2019 | Empire | Hey Beautiful | Episode: "Hot Blood, Hot Thoughts, Hot Deeds" |
| 2020–2021 | Zoey's Extraordinary Playlist | Mo | Main cast (25 episodes) |
| 2020 | RuPaul's Secret Celebrity Drag Race | Themself (Winner) | Episode: "RuPaul Roast" |
| 2020 | Mélange | Genesis | Television special |
| 2021 | Our Kind of People | Tommy "Tizzie" Jones | Episode: "Crabs in a Gold-Plated Barrel" |
| 2021 | Zoey's Extraordinary Christmas | Mo | Television film |
| 2022 | The Book of Queer | Narrator (voice) | Episode: "Gay to Z" |
| 2023 | Learning with Pibby: Apocalypse | Melira (voice) | Television short |
| 2024–2025 | Moon Girl and Devil Dinosaur | Pebble (voice) | 2 episodes |
| 2025–present | Hazbin Hotel | Zeezi (voice) | 2 episodes |

=== Theater ===
| Year | Title | Role | Notes |
|---|---|---|---|
| 2009 | Once on This Island | Papa Ge | Marblehead Little Theatre |
| 2010 | The 25th Annual Putnam County Spelling Bee | Mitch Mahoney | Marblehead Little Theatre |
| 2011 | Hairspray | Motormouth Maybelle Stubbs | Marblehead Little Theatre |
| 2017 | Saturday Night Fever | Candy | Drury Lane Theatre |
| 2017–2019 | Once on This Island | Asaka | Circle in the Square Theatre, Broadway |
| 2019 | The Scarlet Pimpernel | Ensemble | David Geffen Hall |
| 2020 | Joseph and the Amazing Technicolor Dreamcoat | Narrator | Manhattan Concert Productions |
| 2022 | The Last Supper | Jude | South Orange Performing Arts Center |
| 2022 | Shucked | Lulu | Pioneer Theatre Company |
| 2023–2024 | Shucked | Lulu | Nederlander Theatre, Broadway |
| 2024 | Gutenberg! The Musical! | The Producer (One night cameo) | James Earl Jones Theatre, Broadway |
| 2024 | Pippin | The Leading Player | Theatre Royal Drury Lane, West End; 50th Anniversary Concert |
| 2025 | The Drowsy Chaperone | Janet Van De Graaff | Carnegie Hall |
| 2025 | Bat Boy: The Musical | Pan | New York City Center, Off-Broadway |
| 2025–2026 | Chicago | Mama Morton | Ambassador Theatre, Broadway |
| 2026 | Once on This Island | Asaka | Theatre Royal Drury Lane, West End |

== Awards and nominations ==
| Year | Award | Category | Nominated work | Result | Ref. |
|---|---|---|---|---|---|
| 2013 | Screen Actor's Guild Awards | Outstanding Performance by an Ensemble in a Comedy Series | Glee | Nominated | |
| 2019 | Grammy Award | Best Musical Theater Album | Once on This Island | Nominated | |
| 2021 | Critics' Choice Television Award | Best Supporting Actor in a Comedy Series | Zoey's Extraordinary Playlist | Nominated | |
| 2023 | Drama Desk Award | Outstanding Featured Performance in a Musical | Shucked | Won | |
| 2023 | Drama League Award | Distinguished Performance | Shucked | Nominated | |
| 2023 | Outer Critics Circle Award | Outstanding Featured Performer in a Broadway Musical | Shucked | Won | |
| 2023 | Tony Awards | Best Performance by a Featured Actor in a Musical | Shucked | Won | |
| 2024 | Grammy Awards | Best Musical Theater Album | Shucked | Nominated | |
