= Leandra Ramm =

American actor and singer-songwriter

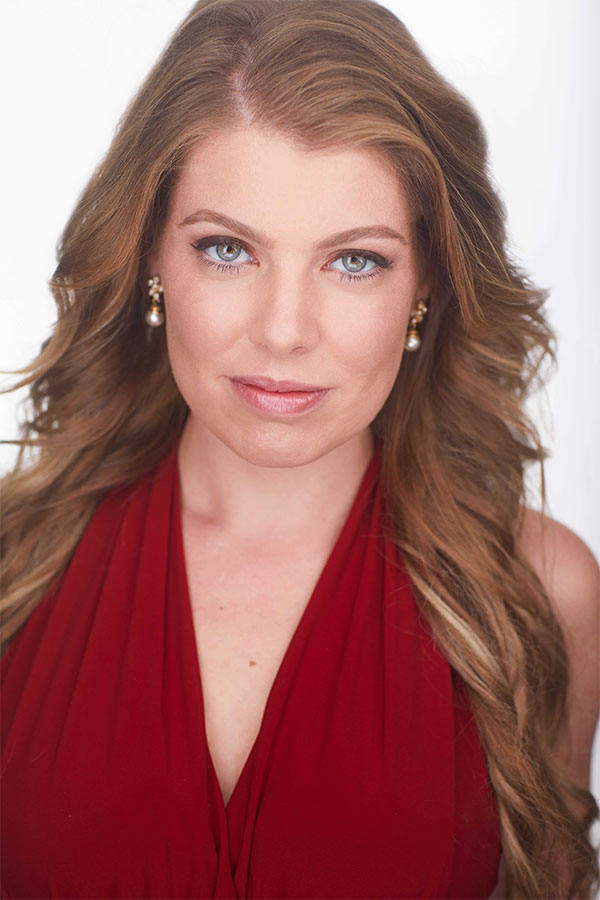
- Born: Leandra Erin Ramm; New York City, U.S.
- Education: Manhattan School of Music
- Occupations: Singer and actress
- Years active: 1998–present
- Known for: Opera and musical theatre
- Website: www.leandraramm.com

Leandra Erin Ramm is an American singer and actress known for opera and musical theatre. She is an offspring of the Repository for Germinal Choice (otherwise known as "The Genius Sperm Bank").

== Early life ==
Ramm was conceived from the Repository for Germinal Choice, otherwise known as the Genius Sperm Bank. Born in Roosevelt Island, New York, a small island in Manhattan's East River, she was brought up by her parents Adrienne and David Ramm. Her biological father, known as "Donor Clear," is a scientist who works at a university and has published major research in his field. Ramm has been featured in performances and interviews on many media outlets, including television appearances on Anderson Cooper 360°, The View, 60 Minutes, and Good Morning America.

== Education and training ==
Ramm studied classical voice at Manhattan School of Music. She balanced performing and school and said in a television interview that what's important is "nature and nurture" After college she went on to perform as a young artist with Sarasota Opera, Des Moines Metro Opera, Opera Carolina, Arizona Opera and other opera companies. She began to add musical theatre to her repertoire in 2006 with roles such as Antonia in Man of la Mancha (Diablo Theatre Company), Estelle in The Full Monty (Media Theatre) and Leila in Iolanthe (Buxton Opera House) in the US and UK.

== Performance career ==
Ramm is a classically trained mezzo-soprano whose performances have been described as "beautiful and quite moving" (Nordstjernan Newspaper), "clear" and "perfect" (bachtrack.com). Equally at home with opera and musical theatre, Ramm performs in both genres. She has performed at numerous concert venues throughout the world including Carnegie Hall, Lincoln Center, The United Nations, and Symphony Space. Some of her most notable roles are: One Night with You (one woman show at the United Solo Theater Festival), Hester Prynne, A for Adultery (The Little Times Square Theatre), Sarah, Darwin in Malibu (Indra's Net Theater), Tanya, Mamma Mia!, (Woodminster Summer Musicals), Leila, Iolanthe (International Gilbert & Sullivan Festival, Buxton Opera House, UK) and as a Lead Vocalist, Production Shows (Celebrity Cruises).

== Discography ==
- Mario and the Magician (2005)
- Dream Angel (2010)
- Invitation to a Voyage (2010)
- One Night With You (2010)
- You (2011)
- L'amour (2011)
- Running (2012)
- How Can It Be (2012)
- Magical Christmas Cheer (2012)
- No Promises (2014)
- Heavy Hearted (2014)
- Seasons Change (2014)
- The Fourth Messenger (2016)
- Treasure Tower (2017)
- Timeless, Cappella SF (2018)

== Personal life ==
On February 23, 2014, Ramm married Jim Coniglio in Pittsburg, California at the California Theatre (it was the first wedding to take place there). The couple has three children.

== Activism ==
Leandra Ramm is the co-founder of the non-profit organization, the Alliance Against Cybercrime and co-author of the book Stalking A Diva. She contributed to the development of the Protection from Harassment Act in Singapore, a new piece of legislation that was established in 2014. Ramm has spoken at the Council of International Investigators, and virtual harassment seminars about cybercrime laws and internet safety.
