= Gateway Playhouse =

Non-Profit Professional Regional Theater in Bellport, Long Island

Coordinates: 40.762570°N 72.932558°W

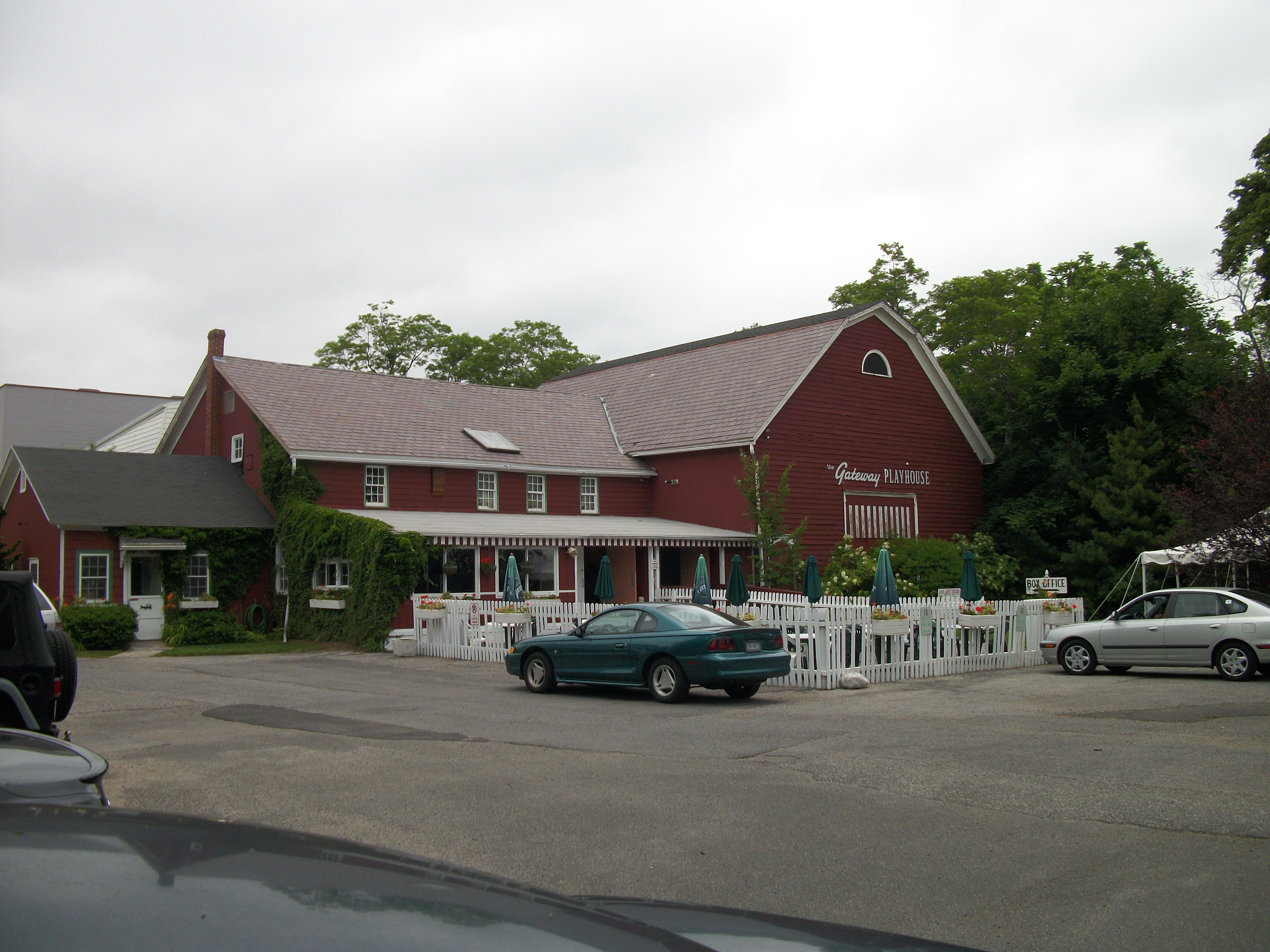
Gateway Playhouse from the parking lot, including the original barn.

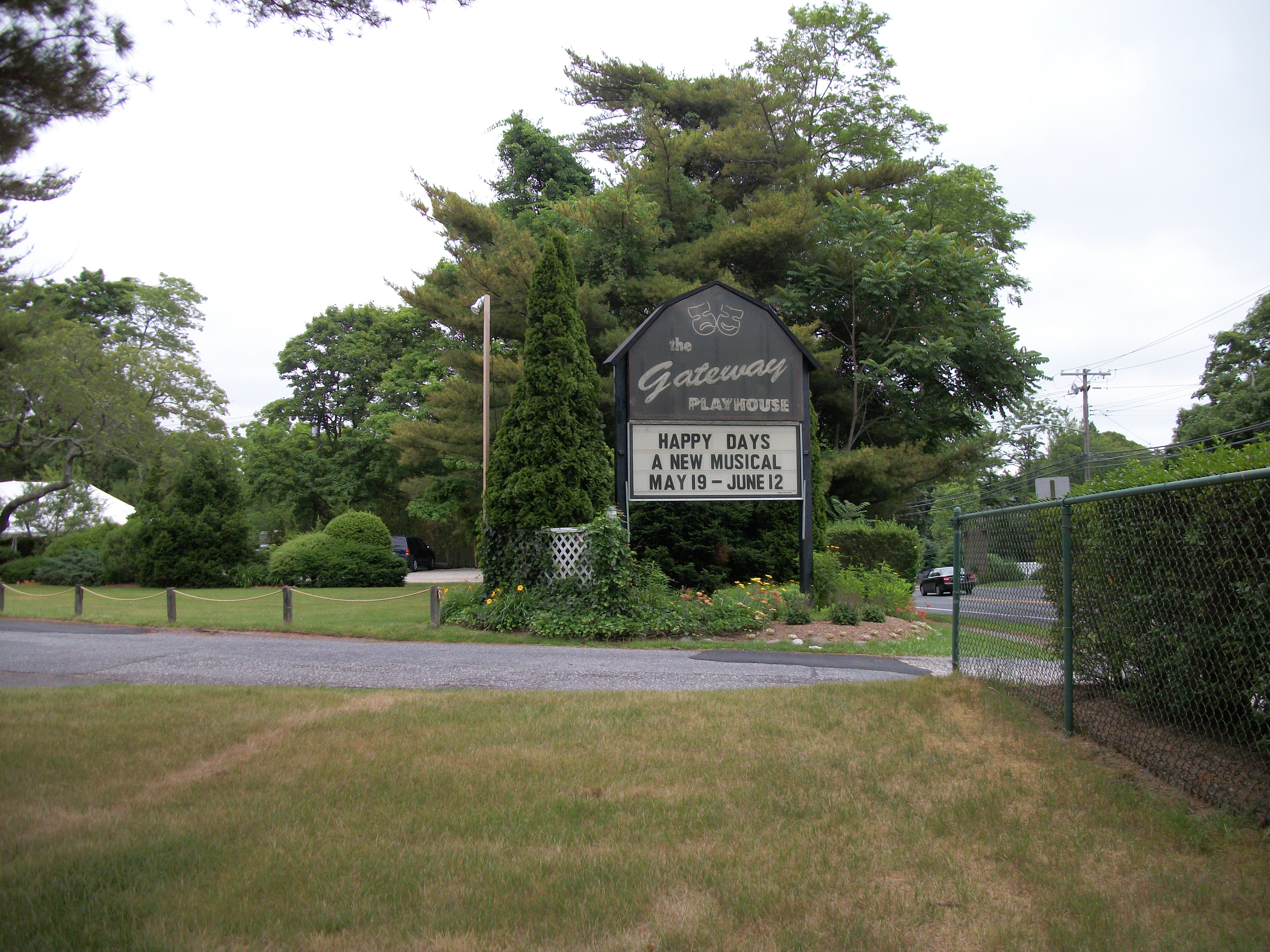
The exit on South Country Road, where the main entrance can be seen.

The Gateway, also known as The Gateway Playhouse, or the Performing Arts Center of Suffolk County is a professional regional theatre located on the eastern edge of Bellport, New York. The street address is 215 South Country Road. It is the oldest professional theatre on Long Island and nationally recognized as one of the top ten summer theatres in the nation.

== History ==
In 1941, Harry C. Pomeran bought a 70-acre farm in Bellport, NY with intentions of creating a hotel. Harry and his wife, Libby, converted the property into a resort hotel for visitors spending the summer on Long Island. Their three children Sally, David, and Ruth planted vegetables, washed dishes, waited tables, and milked the family cow, Daisy. The barn housed Daisy alongside 200 chickens, hay, corn, and other essentials. The windmill pumped the family's water from a deep artesian well. When the Pomeran children began entertaining guests with shows and skits, the family knew that this was the true destiny of the humble barn.

The Gateway's theatrical tradition began in 1950 with a production of Taming of the Shrew in the old barn--converted into a theater by popular demand. By the 1960s, it transitioned from a summer stock to a professional company, complete with a new theater that seats 500. It also began teaching acting classes for children and adults in the area, and staging Children's Theater productions in the summer. In 2011, The Gateway Playhouse and its Acting School combined to form the non-profit organization, the Performing Arts Center of Suffolk County, or The Gateway.

Among its notable productions are a 1992 production of Once on This Island with Norm Lewis, as well as a 2011 production of Sunset Boulevard and a 2016 production of Anything Goes with Andrea McArdle.

Each fall, the theater transforms into the Haunted Playhouse.

== Productions ==
Productions
	All Productions 1950-Present
	Productions 2004-2012
Year	Productions 2013-Present
2013	Grease
	Young Frankenstein
	Legends In Concert
	Buddy: The Buddy Holly Musical
	Singin' In The Rain
	Jack And The Beanstalk
	Disney's Winnie The Pooh
	Seussical Jr.
	Jim West's Dinosaurs
	Mooseltoe
	Disney's Beauty And The Beast
	Live And Let Die
2014	42nd Street
	Smokey Joe's Cafe
	The Addams Family
	Disney's Mary Poppins
	South Pacific
	Legends In Concert
	Disney's Cinderella Kids
	Disney's The Jungle Book
	The Amazing Max
	Mooseltoe
	Cirque Le Masque: Noel
	Elvis Lives
2015	Rock Of Ages
	Nice Work If You Can Get It
	Sister Act
	Betty Buckley In Concert
	Saturday Night Fever
	Legends In Concert
	Two On Tap
	Mooseltoe
	Billy Elliot
	Ballroom With A Twist
	Cinderella
	The Rat Pack Is Back
	The Amazing Max
	Curious George
	Shrek Jr.
	Disney's Peter Pan
2016	Anything Goes
	Million Dollar Quartet
	Ain't Misbehavin'
	The Rocky Horror Show
	Legends In Concert
	Mooseltoe
	Priscilla
	Dance To The Movies
	Holiday Spectacular On Ice
	My Son Pinocchio: Geppeto's Musical Tale
	The Wizard Of Oz
	The Amazing Max
2017	Rent
	Swing!
	On The Town
	Little Shop of Horrors
	Legends in Concert
	Mooseltoe
	Mamma Mia!
	Cirque Éloize iD
	A Christmas Story The Musical
	Menopause The Musical
	The Buddy Holly Story
	Bubble Trouble
	Madagascar Jr.
	Pinkalicious
	The Lion King Jr.
	The Amazing Max
2018	Stomp!
	With Love, Marilyn
	A Chorus Line
	Nunsense
	Memphis
	Cabaret
	Mooseltoe
	Les Misérables School Edition
	Live & Let Die
	Flashdance
	Beauty & The Beast
	Shades of Bublé
2019	Menopause The Musical
	One Man Star Wars Trilogy
	Link Link Circus
	Legends Of Country
	My Life On A Diet
	Billy Mira and the Hitmen
	All Hands On Deck
	On Your Feet
	Beginnings
	Forbidden Broadway
	The Bodyguard
	The Sound Of Music
	Isabella Rossellini & Friends
	Kinky Boots
	Elf
	Stomp
	Big Bubble Bonanza
	Aladdin Jr.
	The Amazing Max
	Frozen Jr.
2020	An Evening With Groucho
	In The Light of Led Zeppelin
	Billy Mira and the Hitmen
	Buddy - The Buddy Holly Story
	Frontiers
	As You Like It
	My Life On A Diet
	Murder On The Orient Express
2021	A Chorus Line - Student Edition
	Songs For A New World
	Million Dollar Quartet
	Best Of The Eagles
	Yellow Brick Road
	A Gentleman's Guide To Love And Murder
	Newsies
	Holiday Spectacular On Ice
	Big Bubble Bonanza
	The Wizard Of Oz
2022	Head Over Heels
	The Little Mermaid
	The Cher Show
	A Christmas Carol
	Beauty And The Beast Jr.
	Big Bubble Bonanza
	Grimmz Fairy Tales
2023	The Wedding Singer
	Clue
	Evita
	Summer - The Donna Summer Musical
	Jersey Boys
	Holiday Spectacular On Ice
	Matilda Jr.
	Finding Nemo Jr.
2024	Fiddler On The Roof
	In The Heights
	Rock Of Ages
	Escape To Margaritaville
	Beautiful - The Carole King Musical
	Irving Berlin's White Christmas
	The Little Mermaid Jr.
	Big Bubble Bonanza
	Willy Wonka Jr.
2025	The Addams Family
	Frozen
	42nd Street

*Links to individual productions incoming
