= Agwé =

Voudou water deity

- Sea, river, fishermen, sailors, sea captains, pirates, Thursday, ships, boats, wind, waves, sea travelers
- Venerated in: Vodou, Folk Catholicism
- Attributes: Shells, fish, blue, white, green, brown, oars, boats, mirrors, telescope, fish hooks, net, sailors uniform

Agwé (also spelt Goue, Agoueh, or Agive) is a lwa who rules over tornadoes, sea, fish, and aquatic plants, as well as the worshipped patron lwa of fishermen and sailors in Vodou, especially in Haiti. He is believed to live on an underwater island and be married to Erzulie Freda and La Sirene. He goes by several titles, including koki la me ("Shell of the Sea"), koki dore ("Golden Shell"), "The Angel in the Mirror", "The Eel", and "The Tadpole in the Pond".

== Agwe Family ==
=== Rada ===
Met Agwe is the lwa of direction. His territory is the winds and the currents, waves and depths of the oceans. He helps sailors find their bearings when lost at sea. He provides inspiration and guidance whenever an individual needs them in times of turmoil, loss, or indecision. He lives in a glorious palace under the seas. Patron of sailors, sea travelers, and pirates. ("Master Agwe")

Agwe Arroyo or Agwe Tawoyo/Agwe 'Woyo ("Agwe of the Streams") is captain of Immamou, the ship that carries the dead to Guinee, the afterlife. He cries salt-water tears for the departed. He assisted the souls of those that suffered crimes against humanity during the trans-Atlantic slave trade.

Papa Agwe is envisioned as a handsome African man with green eyes, sometimes lighter skin, often wearing a naval officer's or sailor's uniform. He is considered to be a gentleman who commands respect and embodies several ideals of masculinity including bravery, reserve, and provision.

=== Petro ===
Agwe Flambeau ("Agwe of the Torch") is from a realm of boiling water, like a hot springs or an underwater volcanic eruption. He is appealed to give rivals bad luck in fishing or sailing. He is also invoked to avoid or remove bad luck at sea, to avoid sinking or drowning, or to stop or prevent rough seas and bad storms.

Agwe Ge-Rouge ("Agwe of the Red Eyes")

== Worship ==
His colors are blue, white, and occasionally sea-green or brown. His veve (ritual symbol) is a boat with sails. His symbols are painted shells, painted oars, and sea life like the seahorse and starfish. He is syncretized with the Catholic saint Ulrich of Augsburg and occasionally the archangel Raphael, both of whom are depicted holding fish. His holy day is Thursday.

He is saluted or signaled with blowing on a conch shell and/or volleys of gunfire. When he possesses a devotee he often pushes himself around the temple on a chair (his boat) with a cane (his oar), shouting naval commands and saluting members of the congregation. His chwal ("horses" or spiritually mounted devotees) need to be kept moist with wet sponges or damp towels and have to be kept from running into the sea, where Agwe belongs.

=== Offerings ===
Small offerings to Agwe are poured or dropped overboard in deep ocean water. Large offerings to Agwe are left on constructed rafts (barques d'Agwe) which are floated or towed out to sea. If the raft sinks, it is accepted; if it returns to shore it is rejected. After the offering is left, the supplicants cannot look back at that place or it will anger Agwe. Chwal must be prevented from falling or leaping into the sea and drowning, as it would offend Agwe. Nothing toxic (lead pipes, cement bags, garbage) must be used to weigh down the raft; if it will hurt or pollute the sea, it will anger Agwe.

His offerings include:

- Beverages: champagne, naval rum, or anisette. Coffee with sugar and cream.
- Items: mirrors, a telescope, toy ships or scale ship models, oars or paddles, sea shells, turquoise beads or jewelry, fish-shaped sculptures or jewelry, fish hooks and nets, nautical uniforms or medals.
- Food: Savory exotic foods, melon, boiled cornmeal, rice cooked in coconut milk, rice cooked with lima beans, boiled or fried ripe bananas, white cake, cane syrup, almond oil, olive oil.
- Sacrificial Animals: White roosters, male ducks, and white rams or goats whose wool has been dyed with indigo. They are afterwards prepared, cooked, and then placed in serving dishes or on plates as a sacrifice (as king of the seas, he doesn't get hot food at home).

He is rarely offered seafood. If it is offered (perhaps to celebrate a bountiful year, good fortune, or a joyous occasion) it must be prepared and then cooked in a pan or oven. Then (to be fit for the table of the king of the sea) it must be served on a white china dish with blue patterns.

== See also ==
Agwe's ship is crewed by other lwa as well:

Agassou, Papa Agwe's first lieutenant, shown in the form of a crab.
Silibo, the patron of the sacred baths.
Ogou Balendjo, Ogou in his aspect of the healer.

At Agwe's ceremonies, they arrive first to make sure the place is fit for "The Admiral".

== In popular culture ==
- In the Broadway musical based on the story Once on This Island, Agwe is declared the god of water, appearing alongside three other gods: mother of Earth Asaka (Azaka), goddess of love Erzulie, and Lwa of death Papa Gé (Papa Ghede).
- Agwe is a character in the novel My Love, My Love, or The Peasant Girl by Rosa Guy.
- Lwa Agwe (together with the adepts of Voodoo) is depicted in Andrei Gusev's 2020 novel Once in Malindi.
- Haitian musician and manbo Moonlight Benjamin featured a song dedicated to the Lwa Mèt Agwe on her third studio album Siltane.
