= Norm Lewis =

American actor, singer (born 1963)

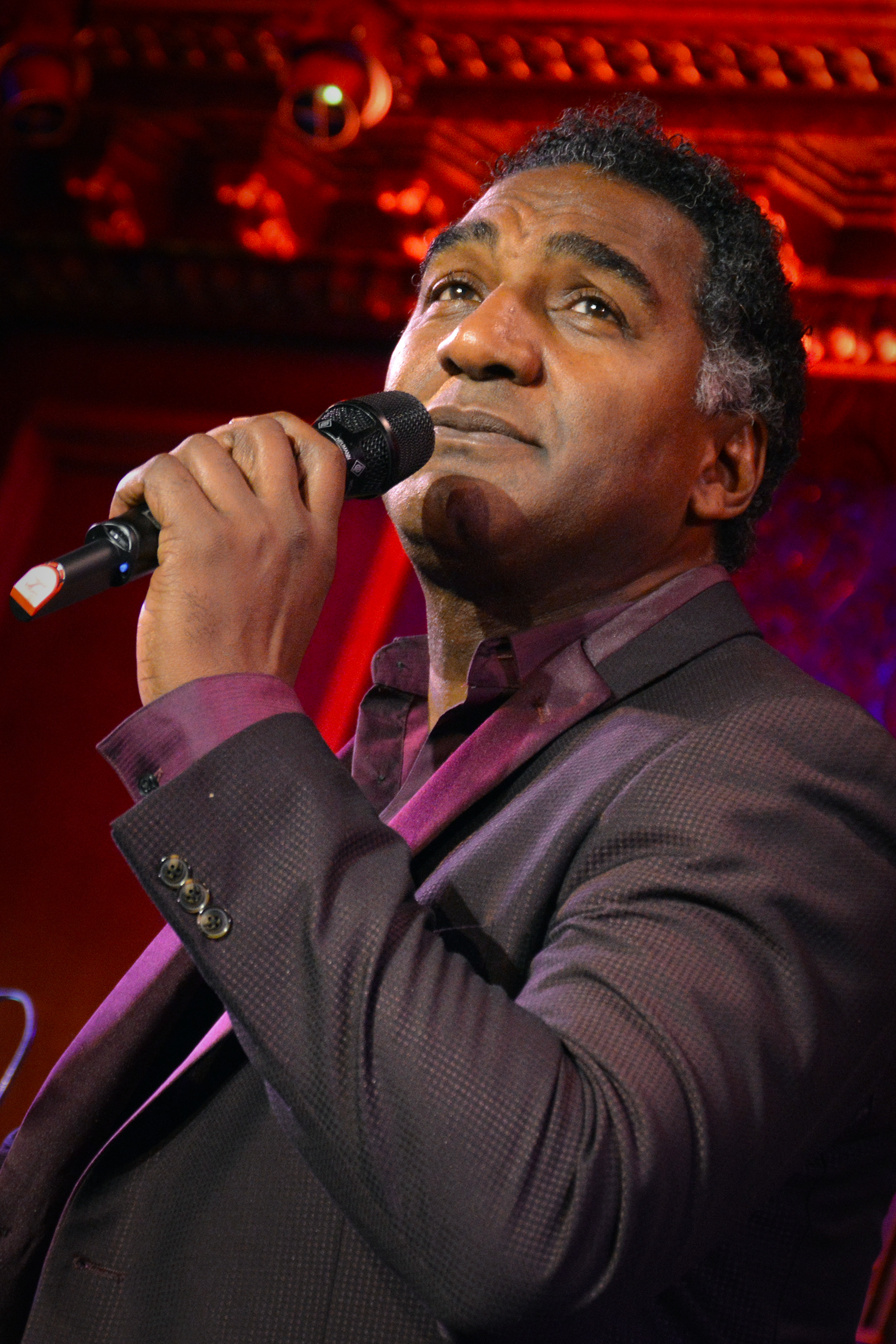
- Born: June 2, 1963 (age 63); Tallahassee, Florida, U.S.
- Occupations: Actor; singer
- Years active: 1986–present
- Known for: The Phantom of the Opera; Les Misérables; The Little Mermaid
- Website: normlewis.com

Norm Lewis (born June 2, 1963) is an American actor and baritone singer. He has appeared on Broadway and in London's West End, film, television, recordings and regional theatre. He is also noted for his wide vocal range. Lewis was the second African-American actor after Robert Guillaume to perform in the title role in Andrew Lloyd Webber's The Phantom of the Opera and the first one to do so in the Broadway production. In 2023, he reprised the role in the show's sequel, Love Never Dies, in the West End.

Lewis is also known for his many different performances as Inspector Javert in Les Misérables, first playing the role in the 2006 Broadway revival and later reprising the role in the West End, in the 25th Anniversary Concert, and at The Muny in St. Louis.

Some other major theatrical productions that he has been involved in include Porgy and Bess, The Little Mermaid, Miss Saigon, Jesus Christ Superstar, and Sweeney Todd: The Demon Barber of Fleet Street.

== Early life ==
Norm Lewis was born in Tallahassee, Florida, and grew up in Eatonville, Florida. He graduated in 1981 from Edgewater High School, Orlando. He worked at the Orlando Sentinel prior to his acting career.

== Career ==
=== 1992–2005: Early career, Broadway debut and Miss Saigon ===
Lewis credits the kickoff of his career to Ralph Petillo, who ran Theatre on Park in Winter Park, Florida.

Lewis was featured as Agwe in the Gateway Playhouse (Bellport, New York) production of Once on This Island in 1992.

Lewis made his Broadway debut in The Who's Tommy (1993). He was a replacement in Miss Saigon as John Thomas. In 1997, he originated the role of Jake in Side Show. He also appeared in Michael John LaChiusa's Broadway musical The Wild Party as Eddie Mackrel. Lewis was in Michel Legrand's short-lived musical Amour in 2002, which also featured Melissa Errico, Malcolm Gets, and Lewis Cleale. He played the racketeer Eddie Satin in the New York City Center Encores! staged concert of Golden Boy in March 2002. He played Billy Flynn in the Broadway revival of Chicago in February 2004 and March 2004. He performed in several benefit concerts, including Dreamgirls (2001), Chess (2003), and Hair.

In 2005, Lewis starred in the Public Theater's Shakespeare in the Park revival of a musical version of Two Gentlemen of Verona. He played the role of Nathan in the Lincoln Center 2005 production of Dessa Rose.

=== 2006–2013: Les Misérables, The Little Mermaid, and Tony nomination ===
Lewis has played Javert in the musical Les Misérables several times. He first starred in the role in the 2006 Broadway revival, making him the first African American actor to play the role in a professional English-language production. He later reprised it in the West End production. At London's O2 Arena, he sang the role in the 25th anniversary concert of the show. Lewis again reprised the role opposite Hugh Panaro as Jean Valjean in The Muny, St. Louis production from July 15–21, 2013.

In 2007, he originated the role of King Triton in the Broadway production of The Little Mermaid. He went on to sing as King Triton on the original Broadway cast recording.

In regional theatre, he played the title role in Sweeney Todd, the musical by Stephen Sondheim and Hugh Wheeler, at the Casa Mañana Theatre, Fort Worth, Texas, beginning November 10, 2009. He had previously played this role at the Signature Theatre in 1999.

Lewis was featured in the musical revue Sondheim on Sondheim, which premiered in the Roundabout Theatre's Studio 54 in 2010. The production, conceived and directed by James Lapine, also featured Barbara Cook and Vanessa L. Williams. His rendition of "Being Alive" was one of the evening's outstanding highlights.

Lewis appeared in a revised version of Porgy and Bess, as Porgy, first at the Loeb Drama Center (Cambridge, Massachusetts) in August through September 2011 and then on Broadway at the Richard Rodgers Theatre starting in previews on December 12, 2011. This American Repertory Theater production was "re-imagined by Suzan-Lori Parks and Diedre Murray as a musical for contemporary audiences." He was nominated for the Tony Award for Best Actor in a Musical at the 66th Tony Awards and the Drama Desk Award for Outstanding Actor in a Musical for his performance.

Lewis released his first solo album, This Is the Life! in 2008 under the Seahorse Productions label. His other notable recordings include the cast recordings of Side Show, The Who's Tommy, the 1998 cast recording of A New Brain as Roger Delli-Bovi, Scott Alan's Keys and the 2001 New York cast recording of Elegies for Angels, Punks and Raging Queens in aid of the Momentum Aids Project.

In 2012, Lewis joined the cast of the ABC political thriller television series Scandal, in the role of Senator Edison Davis.

In 2013, Lewis starred as Prospero in the Public Theater's PublicWorks Shakespeare in the Park production of The Tempest at the Delacorte Theater. He was one of five professional actors heading a cast of 200 community participants.

He is an investor in the company Lolly Clothing, which was created by his good friend and fellow Broadway actor Chad Kimball.

He appeared in the Stephen Sondheim-Wynton Marsalis staged concert for Encores! titled A Bed and a Chair: A New York Love Affair, at New York City Center, from November 13 to November 17, 2013. The concert was directed by John Doyle and also featured Bernadette Peters, Jeremy Jordan, and Cyrille Aimée.

=== 2014–present: The Phantom of the Opera and further success ===
On May 12, 2014, Lewis assumed the role of the titular Phantom in Andrew Lloyd Webber's The Phantom of the Opera on Broadway. This made him the first black actor to play the role on Broadway and the third worldwide. He succeeded Hugh Panaro and joined fellow returning cast member Sierra Boggess, who returned as Christine Daaé on the same date. On February 7, 2015, Lewis ended his tenure as the Phantom with a performance at the Majestic Theatre. Coverage in Playbill credited him for his "impressive Broadway resumé". Being succeeded by actor James Barbour, Lewis remarked that he had been a fan of the musical for many years and felt that obtaining the part finally had been akin to winning the lottery. Lewis is a recipient of the 2014 AUDELCO Special Achievement Award.

In 2016, Lewis reprised his role of King Triton for a live Hollywood Bowl concert production of The Little Mermaid. He also began playing Agwe in Once on This Island on January 8, 2018, at the Circle in the Square Theatre and played the role until March that same year. Lewis reprised his role of Sweeney Todd in 2017 in the Off-Broadway production of Sweeney Todd: The Demon Barber of Fleet Street receiving an AUDELCO Award for his performance.

Lewis portrayed Caiaphas in the live televised concert production of Jesus Christ Superstar on April 1, 2018, Easter Sunday. In February 2019, Lewis played Harold Hill in the Kennedy Center production of The Music Man. When asked about appearing in the show, Lewis said "It’s one of those fun shows that is an American musical theatre classic, and I just think it is a good fit for me." Lewis was in the 2022 to 2023 North American tour of A Soldier’s Play as Captain Richard Davenport. In 2023, he reprised the role of the Phantom in the sequel to The Phantom of the Opera, Love Never Dies, in London's West End.

In 2026, Lewis voiced Ubaldo Piangi in Erin A. Craig's audiobook Our Strange Duet (2026), a new reimagining and followup to Webber's musical The Phantom of the Opera.

== Theatre credits ==
List of stage performances
Year	Title	Role	Theater	Notes
1989	Joseph and the Amazing Technicolor Dreamcoat	Those Canaan Days / Butler	Candlewood Playhouse	Regional
1990	A Funny Thing Happened on the Way to the Forum	Protean	Harrah's Atlantic City	Regional
1990	Pippin	The Leading Player	Shawnee Playhouse	Regional
1992	Once on This Island	Agwe	Gateway Playhouse	Regional
1993	The Who's Tommy	Specialist	St. James Theatre	Broadway
1994–1996	Miss Saigon	John Thomas	Princess of Wales Theatre	Toronto
1994–1996	Miss Saigon	John Thomas	Broadway Theatre	Broadway
1994–1996	Miss Saigon	John Thomas	-	US National tour
1997	Side Show	Jake	Richard Rodgers Theatre	Broadway
1998	A New Brain	Roger Delli-Bovi	Mitzi E. Newhouse Theater	Off-Broadway
1999	Company	Robert	Helen Hayes Performing Arts Center	Regional
1999	Sweeney Todd: The Demon Barber of Fleet Street	Sweeney Todd	Signature Theatre	Regional
2000	The Wild Party	Eddie Mackrel	Virginia Theatre	Broadway
2001	Dreamgirls	Curtis Taylor Jr.	Lyric Theatre	Benefit concert
2002	Amour	Various	Music Box Theatre	Broadway
2002	Golden Boy	Eddie Satin	New York City Center	Encores!
2003	Chess	Alexander Molokov	New Amsterdam Theatre	Benefit concert
2003	Children of Eden	The Father	The York Theatre Company	Benefit concert
2004	Chicago	Billy Flynn	Ambassador Theatre	Broadway
2004	Ragtime	Coalhouse Walker, Jr.	North Carolina Theatre	Regional
2004	Hair	Tribe	New Amsterdam Theatre	Benefit concert
2005	Two Gentlemen of Verona	Valentine	Delacorte Theater	Central Park
2005	Dessa Rose	Nathan	Mitzi E. Newhouse Theatre	Broadway
2006–2007	Les Misérables	Inspector Javert	Broadhurst Theatre	Broadway
2007	The Little Mermaid	King Triton	Denver Center for the Performing Arts	Regional
2007–2009	The Little Mermaid	King Triton	Lunt-Fontanne Theatre	Broadway
2009	Sweeney Todd: The Demon Barber of Fleet Street	Sweeney Todd	Casa Manana Theatre	Regional
2009	First You Dream: The Music of Kander & Ebb	Performer	Signature Theatre	Regional
2010	Sondheim on Sondheim	Performer	Roundabout Theatre	Broadway
2010–2011	Les Misérables	Inspector Javert	Queen's Theatre	West End
2010	Les Misérables	Inspector Javert	The O2 Arena	25th Anniversary Concert
2011	Dracula, the Musical	Abraham Van Helsing / John Seward	-	Studio Cast Recording
2011	The Gershwins' Porgy and Bess	Porgy	Loeb Drama Center	Regional
2011–2012	The Gershwins' Porgy and Bess	Porgy	Richard Rodgers Theatre	Broadway
2012	First You Dream: The Music of Kander & Ebb	Performer	Kennedy Center	Washington, D.C.
2013	Ragtime	Coalhouse Walker, Jr.	Avery Fisher Hall	Lincoln Center
2013	The Pirates of Penzance	Samuel	Delacorte Theater	Concert
2013	Les Misérables	Inspector Javert	The Muny	Regional
2013	The Tempest	Prospero	The Public Theater	Off-Broadway
2013	A Bed and a Chair: A New York Love Affair	Performer	New York City Center	Encores!
2014	The Phantom of the Opera	The Phantom of the Opera	Majestic Theatre	Broadway
2014	Show Boat	Joe	Avery Fisher Hall	Lincoln Center
2014–2015	The Phantom of the Opera	The Phantom of the Opera	Majestic Theatre	Broadway
2016	The Little Mermaid	King Triton	Hollywood Bowl	Concert
2017	Sweeney Todd: The Demon Barber of Fleet Street	Sweeney Todd	Barrow Street Theatre	Off-Broadway
2018	Once on This Island	Agwe	Circle in the Square Theatre	Broadway
2018	Jesus Christ Superstar	Caiaphas	Marcy Avenue Armory	TV Special
2019	The Music Man	Professor Harold Hill	Kennedy Center	Washington, D.C.
2019	The Scarlet Pimpernel	Chauvelin	David Geffen Hall	Lincoln Center
2021	Chicken & Biscuits	Reginald Mabry	Circle in the Square Theatre	Broadway
2022–2023	A Soldier’s Play	Captain Richard Davenport	–	North American tour
2023	Love Never Dies	The Phantom of the Opera	Theatre Royal Drury Lane	West End Concert
2024	Gutenberg! The Musical!	Guest Producer	James Earl Jones Theatre	Broadway
2024	Children of Eden	The Father	David Geffen Hall	Lincoln Center
2024	Follies	Benjamin Stone	Carnegie Hall	Concert
2025	Ceremonies in Dark Old Men	Russell B. Parker	Theatre At St. Clements	Off-Broadway
2025	La Cage aux Folles	Georges	The Muny	Regional
2026	Monte Cristo	Villefort	York Theatre	Off-Broadway
2026	Shuffle Along	Noble Sissle	Rose Theatre	Lincoln Center

Sources: Lortel.org; PlayBillVault

== Discography ==
- A New Brain: Original Cast Recording, 1998 (as Roger Delli-Bovi)
- Disney's The Little Mermaid: Original Broadway Cast Recording, 2008 (as King Triton)
- This Is the Life!, 2008
- Les Miserables In Concert (25th Anniversary Edition), 2010 (as Inspector Javert)
- Dracula, the Musical Concept Album, 2011 (as Abraham Van Helsing / John Seward)
- Jesus Christ Superstar Live in Concert (Original Soundtrack of the NBC Television Event), 2018 (as Caiaphas)
- The Norm Lewis Christmas Album, 2018

== Film credits ==
List of film performances
Year	Title	Role	Notes
2001	Confidences	Reggie	Short film
2005	Preaching to the Choir	Reverend Tucker	
2010	Sex and the City 2	Reginald	
2010	Les Misérables in Concert: The 25th Anniversary	Javert	
2011	Pizza Verdi	Reggie	Short film
2014	Winter's Tale	Custodian	
2016	Magnum Opus	Charlie Lutwidge	
2018	Jesus Christ Superstar Live in Concert	Caiaphas	
2019	Just Mercy	Newscaster	Voice role
2020	Da 5 Bloods	Eddie	
2021	Moostletoe	Gus' Singing Voice	Voice role
2021	Heirloom	George	Short film
2023	The Good Mother	Jim	
2026	Office Romance	Richard Howell	

== Television credits ==
List of television performances
Year	Title	Role	Notes
1997	As the World Turns	Detective Hale	Episode: "May 9, 1997"
1998	All My Children	Keith McLean	9 episodes
2001	Strong Medicine	Mr. Phillips	1 episode
2007	Mystery Woman: In the Shadows	Doctor	TV movie
2012–2015	Scandal	Senator Edison Davis	16 episodes
2014	Hustling	Senator Bailey	2 episodes
2014	Blue Bloods	DA James Campbell	Episode: "Righting Wrongs"
2014	The Blacklist	J.P. Laskin	Episode: "Dr. James Covington (No. 89)"
2015	Gotham	Deputy Mayor Harrison Kane	Episode: "Rise of the Villains: The Last Laugh"
2015	Kern & Hammerstein's Show Boat	Joe	Television film
2015	First You Dream: The Music of Kander & Ebb	Performer	Television film
2016	Chicago Med	Bobby	Episode: "Saints"
2016	Younger	Clay	Episode: "What's Up, Dock?"
2017	Daytime Divas	William Tomas	9 episodes
2019	Bull	Medical Examiner Henson	Episode: "Split Hairs"
2019	Unbreakable Kimmy Schmidt	Rumbleshanks	Episode: "Kimmy is Rich*!"
2019	Better Things	Himself	Episode: "The Unknown"
2019	She's Gotta Have It	Don Swan	Episode: "#IAmYourMirror"
2020	Mrs. America	Ron Dellums	Episode: "Shirley"
2020	NOS4A2	Dr. Gregory	Episode: "The Hourglass"
2021	Pose	Pastor Vernon Jackson	Episode: "Take Me to Church"
2021	Dr. Death	Dr. Bishara	Episode: "An Occurrence at Randall Kirby's Sink"
2021	Christmas in Tune	Duke	Television film
2021–2022	Central Park	Lionel	Voice role; 3 episodes
2022	Women of the Movement	Roy Wilkins	2 episodes
2022	Law & Order	Henry King	Episode: "The Right Thing"
2022	Riverdale	Titus Tate	Episode: "Chapter One Hundred and Six: Angels in America"
2023	Swarm	Wilbur	Episode: "Only God Makes Happy Endings"
2023	Up Here	Cyprian	2 episodes
2023	Run the World	Malik	Episode: "No Regrets"

== Awards and nominations ==
List of awards and nominations received by Norm Lewis
Year	Award	Category	Nominated Work	Result
2000	Helen Hayes Award	Outstanding Lead Actor in a Resident Musical	Sweeney Todd: The Demon Barber of Fleet Street	Nominated
2005	Drama Desk Award	Outstanding Featured Actor in a Musical	Dessa Rose	Nominated
2012	Tony Award	Best Performance by a Leading Actor in a Musical	Porgy and Bess	Nominated
2012	Drama Desk Award	Outstanding Actor in a Musical	Porgy and Bess	Nominated
2012	Drama League Award	Distinguished Performance	Porgy and Bess	Nominated
2012	Outer Critics Circle Award	Outstanding Actor in a Musical	Porgy and Bess	Nominated
2013	Grammy Award	Best Musical Theater Album	Porgy and Bess	Nominated
2017	AUDELCO Award	Lead Musical Actor	Sweeney Todd: The Demon Barber of Fleet Street	Won
2019	Grammy Award	Best Musical Theater Album	Jesus Christ Superstar Live in Concert	Nominated
2021	Screen Actors Guild Award	Outstanding Performance by a Cast in a Motion Picture	Da 5 Bloods	Nominated

== See also ==
- This Is the Life!
