= Phillip Boykin =

American singer and actor (born 1968)

Phillip Boykin (sometimes credited as Phillip Lamar Boykin) (born November 2, 1968) is an American Tony Award nominated actor and bass-baritone singer. He is most well known for portraying Hades in the Broadway production of Hadestown from September 2023 to January 2025 and rejoined the company in April 2025 for a run set through August 2025. He later reprised the role in the West End production, performing alongside the original Broadway stars from February 11 until March 9, 2025.

== Early life ==
One of ten children, Boykin grew up in Greenville, South Carolina. He started studies in Opera Performance at South Carolina State College before transferring to the North Carolina School of the Arts. He left NCSA in 1990 and moved to the Hartt School of the University of Hartford where he received his Bachelor of Music in Vocal Performance in 1995. He later studied toward a Master's degree in Opera and Jazz Vocals from Howard University.

He received the 2015 Hartt Alumni Award from The Hartt School.

== Career ==
Boykin portrayed Joe in the 1999 to 2001 non-equity tour of Show Boat. He reprised the role in the 2008 North Shore Music Theatre production (which won him an IRNE Award), the 2009 Media Theatre production, and the 2013 Wells Fargo Pavilion production. He also played Caiaphas in the North Shore Music Theatre production of Jesus Christ Superstar in 2006.

He was nominated for the Tony Award, as well as the Drama Desk and Outer Critics Circle Award for Outstanding Featured Actor in a Musical for his role as Crown in the Broadway revival of Porgy and Bess (2012). He was awarded the Theater World Award for his Outstanding Broadway debut. He reprised the role in 2014 at Regent's Park Open Air Theatre.

Boykin portrayed Booker T. Washington in Ragtime at Avery Fisher Hall in 2013. He was also featured in On the Town which ran on Broadway at the Lyric Theatre in 2014-2015. In 2015, he starred as the Pirate King in New York City Center’s The Pirates of Penzance. In 2017 he was featured in the Broadway revival of Sunday in the Park with George. He made Broadway history as the first African-American Boatman/Lee Randolph in the production, which reopened Broadway's newest and oldest theater at the time, the Hudson Theatre, which played its last Broadway show in 1968. Boykin played the role of Tonton Julian in the Revival of Once on This Island, which opened on Broadway at the Circle in the Square Theatre on December 3, 2017 and closed on January 6, 2019. In 2022, he was featured in the Hugh Jackman led Broadway revival of The Music Man as Olin Britt and a Traveling Salesman.

He is the founder and director of "The NYGospel Brothers", a gospel quartet that travels around the world spreading the good news.

He was seen in the films Freedom (2014) starring Cuba Gooding Jr., Top Five (2014) starring Chris Rock, and Easter Mysteries an oratorio-musical written by John O’Boyle.

In 2019, he was inducted into the South Carolina Theatre Association Hall of Fame following a performance of the Once on this Island tour in his hometown of Greenville, South Carolina.

In September 2023, he started starring in the Broadway production of Hadestown as Hades. He performed his final Broadway performance on January 12, 2025 opposite Jordan Fisher as Orpheus. Not long after he left the Broadway production, Phillip made his West End debut after he joined the cast of the West End production in February 2025 to fill in for Patrick Page, after he got injured during rehearsals. Phillip only got three days notice before performing his first performance in London. After Phillip was originally slated to play Hades for at least a week, it was later announced that due to Page’s achilles injury, Phillip would be performing in all shows (except the filming dates, where Page would be performing) until March 9, 2025. Boykin rejoined the Broadway cast on April 22 for a limited engagement through August 31, 2025.

== Stage credits ==
| Year(s) | Production | Role | Notes |
|---|---|---|---|
| 1999-2001 | Show Boat | Joe | US Tour |
| 2004 | Show Boat | Joe | Show Palace |
| 2006 | Jesus Christ Superstar | Caiaphas | North Shore Music Theatre |
| 2008 | Show Boat | Joe | North Shore Music Theatre |
| 2009 | Show Boat | Joe | Media Theatre |
| 2011 | Porgy and Bess | Crown | American Repertory Theatre |
| 2011-2012 | Porgy and Bess | Crown | Broadway debut |
| 2013 | Ragtime | Booker T. Washington | Avery Fisher Hall |
| 2013 | Show Boat | Joe | Wells Fargo Pavilion |
| 2014 | Porgy and Bess | Crown | Regent's Park Open Air Theatre |
| 2014-2015 | On the Town | Workman / Turnstiles' Announcer / Dream Coney Island Master of Ceremonies / Rajah Bimmy u/s Judge Pitkin | Broadway |
| 2015 | Big River | Jim | Wells Fargo Pavilion |
| 2015 | The Pirates of Penzance | The Pirate King | Off-Broadway; Encores! |
| 2016 | The Pirates of Penzance | Samuel | Barrington Stage Company |
| 2016 | Sunday in the Park with George | Boatman / Lee Randolph | Off-Broadway; Encores! |
| 2017 | Sunday in the Park with George | Boatman / Lee Randolph | Broadway |
| 2017-2019 | Once on This Island | Tonton Julian | Broadway |
| 2019 | The Wiz | The Cowardly Lion | Wells Fargo Pavilion |
| 2019-2020 | Once on This Island | Tonton Julian | US Tour |
| 2021-2023 | The Music Man | Olin Britt / Barbershop Quartet / Traveling Salesman | Broadway |
| 2023 | Iolanthe | Private Willis | Carnegie Hall |
| 2023 | The Music Man | Olin Britt | Broadway Sacramento |
| 2023-2025 | Hadestown | Hades | Broadway |
| 2025 | Hadestown | Hades | West End debut |
| 2025 | Hadestown | Hades | Broadway |
| 2026 | Jesus Christ Superstar | Caiaphas | Wells Fargo Pavilion |
| 2026 | Man of La Mancha | The Governor / The Barber | Broadway Concert |

== Awards and nominations ==
| Year | Award | Category | Nominated work | Result | Ref. |
|---|---|---|---|---|---|
| 2012 | Tony Award | Best Featured Actor in a Musical | Porgy and Bess | Nominated | |
| 2012 | Drama Desk Award | Outstanding Featured Actor in a Musical | Porgy and Bess | Nominated | |
| 2012 | Theatre World Award | | Porgy and Bess | Won | |
| 2019 | Grammy Award | Best Musical Theater Album | Once on This Island | Nominated | |
