= Podell =

Podell is a surname of English Ashkenazi, and Polish origin. Notable people with the surname include:

- Albert Podell (born 1937), magazine editor and writer
- Bertram L. Podell (1925–2005), American politician
- Eyal Podell (born 1975), Israeli-born American actor and screenwriter
- Jonny Podell, American talent agent
- Jules Podell (1899–1973), American businessman
