= State Index on Youth Homelessness =

The State Index on Youth Homelessness is an evaluative tool created through a partnership between the National Homelessness Law Center and True Colors United. Its primary aim is to assess the efforts of U.S. states in addressing and preventing youth homelessness. The index serves as a comprehensive guide to state policies, systemic barriers, and environmental challenges that affect young people experiencing homelessness, especially those between the ages of 12 and 24.

== Background ==
Youth homelessness is a significant issue in the United States, with estimates indicating that millions of young individuals face homelessness at some point. In response to this crisis, the National Homelessness Law Center and True Colors United collaborated to create the State Index on Youth Homelessness. The index, first introduced in 2018, provides an annual evaluation of the states' performance in addressing youth homelessness. It highlights key areas of concern and serves as a benchmark for assessing progress and identifying areas needing improvement.

== Methodology ==
The State Index on Youth Homelessness employs a scoring system out of 100 points, based on a set of comprehensive metrics. These metrics cover various aspects of policy and practice, including:

- Legal protections for homeless youth, such as those related to civil rights and non-discrimination.
- The accessibility and effectiveness of services and support systems aimed at homeless youth.
- Measures to decriminalize homelessness and prevent punitive actions against homeless youth.
- Provisions for unaccompanied homeless youth to seek legal independence and consent.
- Specific considerations for the needs of LGBTQ youth and racial minorities, who are disproportionately represented in the homeless youth population.

Each state's performance is evaluated against these metrics, with higher scores indicating a more robust and effective response to youth homelessness.

== Findings ==
Key findings from the State Index on Youth Homelessness have shed light on the varied landscape of state responses to youth homelessness:

- Many states lack inclusive protections and support systems for LGBTQ youth, contributing to their overrepresentation in the homeless population.
- There is often a lack of coordination and consistency in state policies, leading to gaps in legal protection and service provision for homeless youth.
- States with higher scores tend to have comprehensive plans to end homelessness, entities dedicated to youth homelessness, and laws that protect the rights and dignity of homeless youth.
- The index has noted an improvement in state scores over time, indicating a growing awareness and response to the issue of youth homelessness.

== Impact ==
Policymakers, advocates, and service providers utilize the index to inform their efforts, advocate for necessary changes, and allocate resources effectively. The index also serves an educational purpose, raising awareness about the challenges faced by homeless youth and the policy measures that can make a difference.

== Reception ==
The State Index on Youth Homelessness has been widely recognized for its comprehensive approach and its role in highlighting the plight of homeless youth across the United States. It has received acclaim for bringing attention to the issue and for providing clear, actionable recommendations for state governments. However, it has also faced scrutiny and critique, particularly concerning its methodology and the complexities of translating policy scores into practical outcomes for homeless youth.
