= This Is the Life! =

Studio album by Norm Lewis
- Released: November 25, 2008
- Genre: Pop, Broadway/Musical Theater, Easy listening, big band, jazz standards
- Length: 55:20
- Label: Seahorse Productions

Norm Lewis chronology
This Is the Life! (2008)	The Norm Lewis Christmas Album (2018)

This Is the Life! is the debut studio album by American theater actor and singer Norm Lewis. The album contains an eclectic mix of Broadway, big band, jazz standards, easy listening, opera and pop.

== Track listing ==
1. "This Is the Life" (from the musical Golden Boy) (Strouse, Adams)
2. "Wouldn't It Be Loverly" (from the musical My Fair Lady) (Lerner, Loewe)
3. "No One Is Alone" (from the musical Into the Woods) (Sondheim)
4. "Before the Parade Passes By" (from the musical Hello, Dolly!) (Herman, Stewart)
5. "Moon River" (from the film Breakfast at Tiffany's) (Mercer, Mancini)
6. "We Live on Borrowed Time" (Friedman)
7. "It's Not Unusual" (Reed, Mills)
8. "Misty" (Garner)
9. "All the Things You Are," with Audra McDonald (from the musical Very Warm for May) (Kern, Hammerstein)
10. "Di Provenza" (from La traviata) (Verdi)
11. "Go the Distance" (from the Disney film Hercules) (Menken, Zippell)
