= True Colors United =

- Formation: 2008; 18 years ago
- Founders: Cyndi Lauper, Lisa Barbaris, Jonny Podell
- Type: Non-profit
- Registration no.: EIN 452489069
- Legal status: 501(c)(3) organization
- Purpose: humanitarian
- Locations: New York City; Washington, D.C.
- Coordinates: 40°45′30.5″N 73°59′24″W
- Executive Director & CEO: Gregory Lewis
- President, Board of Directors: Cathy Nelson
- Revenue: US$2,836,931 (equivalent to $3,637,332 in 2025) (2018)
- Volunteers: 13 (2018)
- Website: truecolorsunited.org
- Formerly called: True Colors Fund

True Colors United (formerly True Colors Fund) is an American nonprofit organization addressing the issue of youth homelessness in the United States. Founded in 2008 by Cyndi Lauper, the organization focuses on the unique experiences of LGBT youth, who make up 40% of the homeless youth population in the United States.

== History ==
True Colors United was founded in 2008 by Cyndi Lauper, her manager Lisa Barbaris, and agent Jonny Podell, following the success of Lauper's True Colors tour, which benefited LGBT foundations including the Human Rights Campaign, PFLAG, and the Matthew Shepard Foundation.

== Issue ==
In the United States, up to 1.6 million youth experience homelessness each year. LGBT youth make up to 40% of all young people experiencing homelessness, but are only an estimated 7% of the total youth population. Homeless LGBT youth are at greater risk for victimization, unsafe sexual practices, and mental health issues than non-LGBT youth experiencing homelessness.

The most commonly cited reason LGBT youth become homeless is family rejection due to their sexual orientation or gender identity. Other reasons include family issues, aging out of foster care, abuse in the home, and poverty.

== Work ==
=== Training and education ===
==== True Inclusion Assessment ====
The True Inclusion Assessment tool enables homeless youth serving organizations to assess their level of LGBT-inclusion. Following completion of the Assessment, a work plan is created to guide the organization toward building a safer and more supportive environment for LGBT youth. True Colors United provides technical assistance and support during the implementation of these plans.

==== True Inclusion Directory ====
The True Inclusion Directory is an online directory of safe and affirming services for homeless LGBT youth. Users are able to search for service providers and events based on location and the type of resource needed.

==== True Connect ====
True Connect is a mobile application developed by True Colors United to help connect homeless LGBT youth to resources and opportunities near them. The app will pull data from True Colors United's True Inclusion Directory to link young people to resources like phone charging stations, gender-neutral restrooms, food, shelter, employment programs, and more.

==== True Colors Learning Community ====
The True Colors Learning Community is an international collective of professionals working to address LGBT youth homelessness, or whose work has the potential to impact the issue. 40 to None Network members share case studies, innovative practices and strategies, top headlines from the field, and information about upcoming in person and virtual events.

Learning Community members have access to an online training platform designed to educate individuals about and enable them to address LGBT youth homelessness in their communities. The Learning Community provides short, interactive content to help establish a common understanding about LGBT youth homelessness.

==== LGBTQ Youth Homelessness Prevention Initiative ====
A partnership with five federal partners (the U.S. Departments of Housing and Urban Development (HUD), Education, Health and Human Services, Justice, and USICH), the LGBTQ Youth Homelessness Prevention Initiative identifies successful strategies to address LGBT youth homelessness and implements them in cooperation with communities around the country. Currently, prevention plans are being implemented in Houston, TX and Hamilton County, OH.

==== Youth Count Toolkit ====
Point-In-Time (PIT) counts are mandated by HUD to capture a 24-hour snapshot of a community's homeless population. Since most PIT counts are designed to count adults, True Colors United developed the Youth Count Toolkit to offer communities effective strategies for counting homeless youth.

=== Advocacy ===
==== Federal policy ====
True Colors United works with federal, state, and local government to advocate for policies that fund vital resources for homeless youth, and that programs receiving such funding are inclusive and affirming of LGBT youth. True Colors United's relationship with the White House has led to the first and second ever White House Policy Briefings on Youth Homelessness in 2015 and 2016.

==== State Index on Youth Homelessness ====
The State Index on Youth Homelessness provides a snapshot of some of the legal, systemic, and environmental barriers and complex challenges youth experiencing homelessness face. The Index also provides states, advocates, grassroots activists, and youth themselves with a tool recommending concrete steps that states can take to protect the safety, development, health, and dignity of youth experiencing homelessness, thereby helping end the cycle of homelessness and increasing youth's prospects for a brighter future.

=== Research ===
Every two years, True Colors United collaborates with the Williams Institute to survey homeless youth service providers about the LGBT youth they serve. Information gathered from the survey in published in the Serving Our Youth report and informs the development of True Colors United's public engagement, technical assistance, and online course development. At the Intersections is a collaborative report led by True Colors United and the National LGBTQ Task Force and explores the intersectional nature of the different factors facing homeless LGBT youth.

=== Youth collaboration ===
==== True Colors Fellowship ====
The True Colors Fellowship provides funding and support for six-month projects led by individuals aged 18-24. The program's stated objective is to support LGBTQ+ youth through community organizing and leadership development.

==== National Youth Forum on Homelessness ====
True Colors United's National Youth Forum on Homelessness (NYFH) is a group composed exclusively of young people to contribute to the growing national dialogue on how to make youth homelessness rare, brief, and non-recurring. The primary goal of NYFH is to identify and analyze policy that impacts youth who are at risk of or experiencing homelessness, and advocate for strong policy based upon that analysis. Forum members, all of whom have experienced homelessness, use personal experience, research, and data to assess the effectiveness of programs that assist homeless youth and advocate for change.

==== True Opportunities ====
True Colors United works with corporate and arts world partners to provide at-risk and homeless LGBT youth with the opportunity to learn about career opportunities available to them. Through a partnership with the Tony winning musical Kinky Boots, the Raise You Up program takes young people backstage to show them the many different aspects to putting together a Broadway show, introduce them to cast and crew, and watch the show.

== Events ==
=== #TrueColorsDay ===
#TrueColorsDay is a national day held annually on the last Wednesday of April to raise public awareness about LGBT youth homelessness, and provide people with ways to make a difference. Supporters are encouraged to take "unselfies" (selfies for a good cause) to post online with facts, figures, and messages of support and encouragement. #TrueColorsDay reaches millions online annually.

=== Impact Summit ===
True Colors United's Impact Summit is an annual conference that brings together leaders working to end LGBT youth homelessness for interactive sessions, action planning, and networking opportunities. It is the only national conference focusing on LGBT youth homelessness.

=== State of Out Youth: A Town Hall ===
State of Out Youth is an annual panel discussion with LGBTQ youth from across the country about the most pressing issues facing them today. First held in 2013, State of Out Youth has been a collaborative effort in partnership with CenterLink, GSA Network, the Human Rights Campaign Foundation, and Lambda Legal.

=== Cyndi Lauper & Friends: Home for the Holidays ===
Home for the Holidays is an annual benefit concert held each December at the Beacon Theater in New York City. First held in 2011, the concert raises awareness about LGBT youth homelessness, with 100% of proceeds benefiting True Colors United. Past performers include musicians and comedy acts such as Lou Reed, P!nk, Josh Groban, 50 Cent, Sharon Osbourne, Jason Mraz, Boy George, Ledisi, Nelly Furtado, Sarah McLachlan, Whoopi Goldberg, Adam Lambert, Rosie O'Donnell, Roberta Flack, Carson Kressley, Sufjan Stevens, and St. Vincent.
