= Marblehead Little Theatre =

Community theatre in Marblehead, Massachusetts

Coordinates: 42°30′5.6″N 70°51′22.9″W

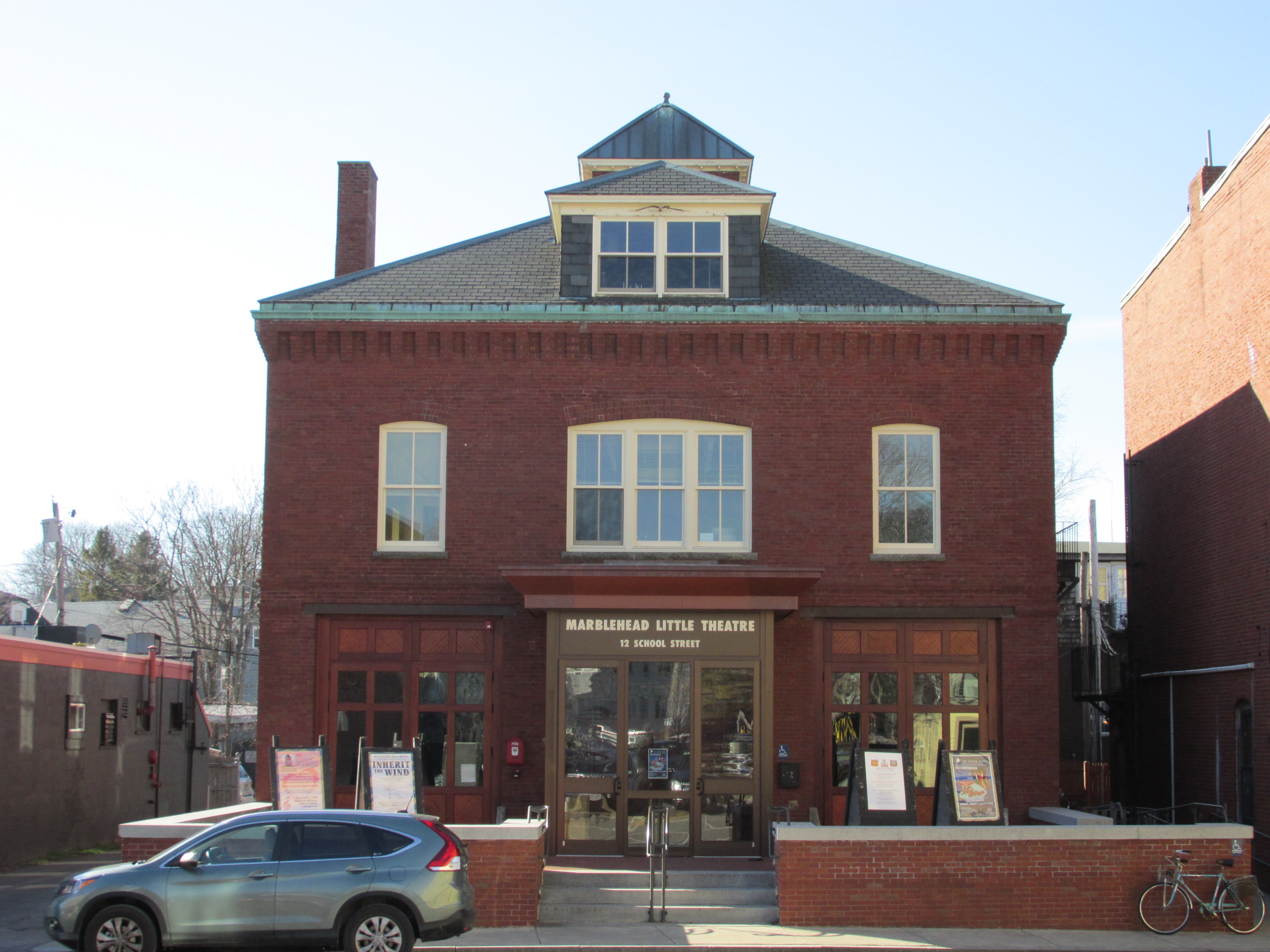
Marblehead Little Theatre

The Marblehead Little Theatre is a community theatre in Marblehead, Massachusetts. Founded in 1956, it is one of the oldest continually operating community theatres in New England.

== History ==
=== The 1950s ===
Encouraged by the response to a one-act play in 1955, The Charm Racquet, the women of the town decided to produce a three-act play and to form a community theatre group. Marblehead Little Theatre's first full-scale production was Moss Hart's Light up the Sky. While casting the show, relatives and friends were enlisted to help with production. The show opened on January 18, 1956, at the Marblehead Junior High School Auditorium.

Throughout the 1950s, MLT held its main productions at the high school using the proscenium stage. As the group gained recognition, they were asked to perform at churches, charity functions, and veteran's hospitals and began including a number of one-act plays suitable for these occasions. MLT has also performed Leonardo da Vinci as a children's presentation at the Museum of Fine Arts in Boston.

=== The 1960s ===
By the 1960s, MLT was doing workshops such as J.B. and The Lady's Not For Burning and also performed Zoo Story and The Bald Soprano. In 1963, MLT was invited to participate in the Marblehead Arts Festival, performing two one-act plays on an outdoor stage.

In the mid-1960s, they decided to begin performing musicals. They began by presenting The Fantasticks with a cast of seven, minimal scenery, and an orchestra consisting of a pianist, a harpist, and a percussionist. The show received such an enthusiastic reception that they were inspired to stage a full-scale musical, Pajama Game, in November 1965. The cast of forty came from all over the North Shore, with membership drawn from Salem, Swampscott, Peabody, Danvers, Beverly, and Hamilton. The production had 18 musical numbers, singing and dancing, and a full orchestra, which was presented at Salem State College's large auditorium and was a sell-out.

The 1960s also saw MLT's entrance into the New England Theatre Conference Annual Community Theatre Drama Festival competition. During the 1960s, MLT began awarding an annual scholarship to a member of the Marblehead High School graduating class who has participated in theatrical productions during high school as well as contributed in some way to Marblehead Little Theatre.

=== The 1970s ===
In 1970, MLT revived The Fantasticks and became a traveling group taking the show to Beverly for a benefit performance for the North Shore Community College. They also toured Endicott College, Arlington, Concord, and the Essex Agricultural and Technical Institute in Danvers.

Abbot Hall became the setting for many musicals produced in the 1970s with the initial staging of Kiss Me Kate followed with superb performances of Man of La Mancha, Fiddler on the Roof, Brigadoon, Camelot, as well as productions for children of The Red Shoes and Aladdin and the Wonderful Lamp.

One of the performances in the 1970s at Abbot Hall was opening night of the Bicentennial show of 1776. There were parties before and after the performance hosted by the Marblehead Bicentennial Commission in the Selectman's Meeting Room with the original Willard painting of the Spirit of '76.

=== The 1980s ===
In the 1980s, MLT began staging their productions at the new Nelson Aldrich Performing Arts Center at the Marblehead High School with a seating capacity of 766 and a stage to rival Boston's professional theater. Productions such as The Music Man, A Funny Thing Happened on the Way to the Forum, and Company further continued this competition between the two theaters.

=== The 1990s ===
During the 1990s, MLT's major project has been obtaining a home of their own to stage small productions, conduct workshops, and provide space to store and build sets, to rehearse, as well as store props and costumes.

The demand of smaller plays in addition to MLT's yearly musicals resulted in the production of One Civilized Person in 1995 as a part of the Marblehead Festival of Arts and later, productions of Exit the Body, The Cemetery Club and Bullshot Crummond, all staged at the Tower School in Marblehead.

1998's major production of The Wizard of Oz staged at the Aldrich Center played to sold out audiences.

During the production of The King and I in the Fall of 1999, the Marblehead Board of Selectmen awarded the School Street Firehouse to Marblehead Little Theatre.
