= All Cried Out (Blonde song) =

Single by Blonde featuring Alex Newell
- Released: 10 April 2015
- Recorded: 2014
- Genre: House
- Length: 2:50
- Label: Parlophone
- Songwriters: Lucas Secon; Jacob Manson; Adam Englefield; Cass Lowe; Rachel Keen
- Producer: Blonde

Blonde singles chronology
"I Loved You" (2014)	"All Cried Out" (2015)	"Feel Good (It's Alright)" (2015)

Alex Newell singles chronology
"Stronger" (2015)	"All Cried Out" (2015)	"This Ain't Over" (2016)

"All Cried Out" is a song by British house duo Blonde. It features vocals from American singer and actor Alex Newell.

== Track listing ==
- Digital download
1. "All Cried Out" (featuring Alex Newell) – 2:50
- Digital download – EP
1. "All Cried Out" (Extended Mix) – 4:15
2. "All Cried Out" (Don Diablo Remix) – 4:29
3. "All Cried Out" (The Magician Remix) – 4:38
4. "All Cried Out" (Martin Ikin Remix) – 5:36
5. "All Cried Out" (99 Souls Remix) – 3:37
6. "All Cried Out" (Oliver Nelson Remix) – 5:26

== Charts ==
=== Weekly charts ===
Chart (2015)	Peak position
Belgium (Ultratip Bubbling Under Flanders)	9
Belgium (Ultratip Bubbling Under Wallonia)	32
Ireland (IRMA)	74
Scotland Singles (OCC)	4
UK Singles (OCC)	4
UK Dance (OCC)	1

=== Year-end charts ===
Chart (2015)	Position
UK Singles (OCC)	98

== Certifications ==
Region	Certification	Certified units/sales
United Kingdom (BPI)	2× Platinum	1,200,000^{‡}
^{‡} Sales+streaming figures based on certification alone.
