= Kill the Lights (Alex Newell, DJ Cassidy and Nile Rodgers song) =

Single by Alex Newell, Jess Glynne, DJ Cassidy and Nile Rodgers
- Released: April 15, 2016
- Recorded: 2016
- Genre: Dance-pop; disco; funk
- Length: 4:36
- Label: Warner; Atlantic
- Songwriter(s): Cassidy Podell; Gregory Cohen; Akil C. King; John R. Lardieri; Jaramye Jael Daniels; Kyle Henry Bailey
- Producer(s): DJ Cassidy; Greg Cohen

Alex Newell singles chronology
"Basically Over You (B.O.Y)" (2016)	"Kill the Lights" (2016)	"Need Somebody" (2016)

Jess Glynne singles chronology
"Ain't Got Far to Go" (2016)	"Kill the Lights" (2016)	"If I Can't Have You" (2016)

DJ Cassidy singles chronology
"Future Is Mine" (2015)	"Kill the Lights" (2016)	"Honor" (2017)

Nile Rodgers singles chronology
"Overcome" (2016)	"Kill the Lights" (2016)	"Give Me Your Love" (2016)

"Kill the Lights" is a song by American recording artist Alex Newell and record producer DJ Cassidy, featuring additional contribution from guitarist Nile Rodgers. The disco song was featured on an episode of the HBO television series, Vinyl (2016), and later appeared on its accompanying extended plays and soundtrack.

Another version of the song features English singer and songwriter Jess Glynne, and a set of remixes of this version by Audien, Yolanda Be Cool, Chuckie, and Dimitri from Paris was released as a single on April 15, 2016.

== Music video ==
The music video for the song was released to YouTube on April 8, 2016.

== Track listing ==
Digital download
No.	Title	Length
1.	"Kill the Lights" (with DJ Cassidy and Nile Rodgers)	4:36

Remix single
No.	Title	Length
1.	"Kill the Lights" (Audien remix)	3:44
2.	"Kill the Lights" (Yolanda Be Cool remix)	5:24
3.	"Kill the Lights" (Chuckie remix)	4:43
4.	"Kill the Lights" (Dimitri from Paris remix)	7:32

== Charts ==
=== Weekly charts ===
Chart (2016)	Peak position
Sweden Heatseeker (Sverigetopplistan)	1
US Dance Club Songs (Billboard)	1
US Hot Dance/Electronic Songs (Billboard)	15

=== Year-end charts ===
Chart (2016)	Position
US Dance Club Songs (Billboard)	11
US Hot Dance/Electronic Songs (Billboard)	74

== Certifications ==
Region	Certification	Certified units/sales
United States (RIAA)	Gold	500,000^{‡}
^{‡} Sales+streaming figures based on certification alone.

== See also ==
- List of number-one dance singles of 2016 (U.S.)
