= Agassou =

A Vodun who guards the old traditions of Dahomey

- Leopards, money, magicians, Thursday, West Africa
- Venerated in: Haitian Vodou, Folk Catholicism, Dahomey, West African Vodun
- Attributes: White, brown, gold, crab, spears, shields, mirror, cigarettes

Agassou (also Ati-A-Sou) is a Vodun who guards the old traditions of Dahomey in the West African Vodun religion and the rada loa of Haitian Vodou.

== Agassou: Royal Leopard King of Africa ==
Agassou is the product of a divine mating—his mother was princess Aligbonu and is said to have mated with a leopard, giving birth to Agassou. Agassou is further noted as ruler and king of a particular sect in Africa that has come to be known as the Agasuvi (children of Agasu). In an act of incest with his mother, he had three sons. Their lineage, their royal regalia, and their legacy are still held by the Agasuvi of West Africa. In that society, the men take their lineage from the clan of Agassou. His shield and his spear are still guarded today—gifts that are said to have been given to him by his angelic father. In the kingdom of Dahomey he is honored as their tohuio (ancestral spirit) along with his mother, Aligbonu. Together they form a dyad that serves as the creation story for Dahomean lineage.

Agassou is then the first human who can be traced back to see how he ascended to the status of loa. In the Priyere, he is called "Houngan Agassou de Bo Miwa" in honor of his work as both a priest/king and a magician. His spears and shield are still in ancient Dahomey which is Benin today.

In rada, he's referred to as Ati-Agassou; in petro Hougan Agassou.

In African oral chant from Benin, Agassou is depicted as the chosen one sent to Haiti by Ayida Wedo to bring the practice to her African children to ease their pain and sufferings from slavery. Agassou was given a crab for the journey.

His day is Thursday and his colors are brown and gold. Hougan (ou'k bon) meaning "you are the righteous one" or the mambo will invoke Agassou when money is needed in the temple; his specialty is making money out of cigarettes.
