= Once on This Island =

1990 musical by Lynn Ahrens and Stephen Flaherty

- Original Broadway Production Logo
- Music: Stephen Flaherty
- Lyrics: Lynn Ahrens
- Book: Lynn Ahrens
- Basis: My Love, My Love; or, The Peasant Girl by Rosa Guy
- Productions: 1990 Broadway; 1994 UK/Europe; 1995 West End; 2009 UK revival 2017 Broadway revival 2019 National Tour; 2022 Hong Kong
- Awards: 1995 Laurence Olivier Award for Best New Musical; 2018 Tony Award for Best Revival of a Musical

Once on This Island is a coming-of-age one-act stage musical with a book and lyrics by Lynn Ahrens and music by Stephen Flaherty. It is based on the 1985 novel My Love, My Love; or, The Peasant Girl by Rosa Guy, a Caribbean-set retelling of Hans Christian Andersen's fairy tale The Little Mermaid. It concerns a peasant girl in the French Antilles who falls in love with a rich boy and makes a deal with the gods to save his life.

The original Broadway production ran from 1990 to 1991, and the West End production opened in 1994, where it won the 1995 Laurence Olivier Award for Best New Musical. The musical was revived on Broadway in a production that opened on December 3, 2017 at the Circle in the Square Theatre. The revival was showered with critical acclaim, with New York Times critic Jesse Green describing it as "ravishing" and The Huffington Post praising it for creating "an aesthetic experience unlike anything seen on Broadway." It won the 2018 Tony Award for Best Revival of a Musical.

A Disney film adaptation is currently in development for Disney+.

== Production history ==
=== Off-Broadway (1990) ===
Once on This Island was originally staged at Off-Broadway's Playwrights Horizons, running from May 6, 1990, until May 27, 1990.

=== Broadway (1990–1991) ===
The Broadway production opened on October 18, 1990, at the Booth Theatre and closed on December 1, 1991, after 469 performances and 19 previews. With direction and choreography by Graciela Daniele, the musical featured LaChanze as Ti Moune, Jerry Dixon as Daniel, Andrea Frierson as Erzulie, Sheila Gibbs as Mama Euralie, Kecia Lewis as Asaka, Gerry McIntyre as Armand, Milton Craig Nealy as Agwe, Eric Riley as Papa Ge, Ellis E. Williams as Tonton Julian and Afi McClendon as Little Ti Moune.

=== First National Tour (1992–1993) ===
Daniele returned as director/choreographer for a U.S. national tour, which opened at the CIBC Theatre in Chicago on March 31, 1992 and closed at the Heinz Hall for the Performing Arts in Pittsburgh on January 3, 1993. Gibbs reprised her role as Mama Euralie and Gerry McIntyre (the original Armand) played Papa Ge. James Stovall (who replaced Eric Riley on Broadway as Papa Ge) played Agwe. The rest of the cast included Vanita Harbour as Ti Moune, Darius de Haas as Daniel, Natalie Venetia Belcon as Erzulie, Carol Dennis as Asaka, Miles Watson as Tonton Julian, Monique Cintron as Andrea, Keith Tyrone as Armand, and Nilyne Fields as Little Ti Moune.

=== West End (1994) ===
The European premiere took place in 1994, hosted by the Birmingham Rep, and then transferred to the West End Royalty Theatre (now the Peacock Theatre) in September 1994. The production won the Olivier Award for Best New Musical.

=== Broadway Revival (2017–2019) ===
The first Broadway revival of Once on This Island, produced by Ken Davenport, directed by Michael Arden and choreographed by Camille A. Brown, began previews on November 9, 2017, and officially opened on December 3 at the Circle in the Square Theatre. This production featured a stage covered in sand, with live animals onstage, and set and costume design intended to suggest a wrecked beach community recovering from a hurricane. The opening night cast included Hailey Kilgore as Ti Moune, Isaac Powell as Daniel, Alysha Deslorieux as Andrea, Phillip Boykin as Tonton Julian, Kenita R. Miller as Mama Euralie, Alex Newell as Asaka, Merle Dandridge as Papa Ge, Quentin Earl Darrington as Agwe, Lea Salonga as Erzulie and David Jennings as Armand. The revival closed on January 6, 2019, after 458 regular performances.

=== Second National Tour (2019–2020) ===
The Broadway revival production tour in North America starting at The Carson Center, Paducah, Kentucky on October 12, 2019, with the official opening on October 15 at the Tennessee Performing Arts Center, Nashville, Tennessee. The tour is directed by Michael Arden with choreography by Camille A. Brown. The tour featured onstage seating, "creating a unique experience within the footprint of every theatre we play... Audiences will be invited to put their feet in the sand and surround our company, becoming part of the show." The tour ended early due to the COVID-19 pandemic at the Smith Center in Las Vegas, Nevada.

=== Other notable productions ===
In 2002, the original Broadway cast was reunited with special guest Lillias White to perform the show for Broadway Cares/Equity Fights AIDS and the Cantor Fitzgerald Relief Fund.

The musical was revived in the UK in 2009 at Birmingham Rep, Nottingham Playhouse, and the Hackney Empire Theatre in London. Susie McKenna directed, with Sharon D. Clarke reprising her 1994 role as Asaka. The original West End Ti Moune, Lorna Brown, played Erzulie in this production. In June 2012, the Paper Mill Playhouse presented a production directed by Thomas Kail, with Syesha Mercado as Ti Moune and Darius de Haas as Agwe.

A new London production directed by Ola Ince and starring Gabrielle Brooks as Ti Moune was announced for May 2023 at Regent's Park Open Air Theatre, and a concert version of the musical is planned at the Theatre Royal Drury Lane for one night in February 2026.

== Synopsis ==
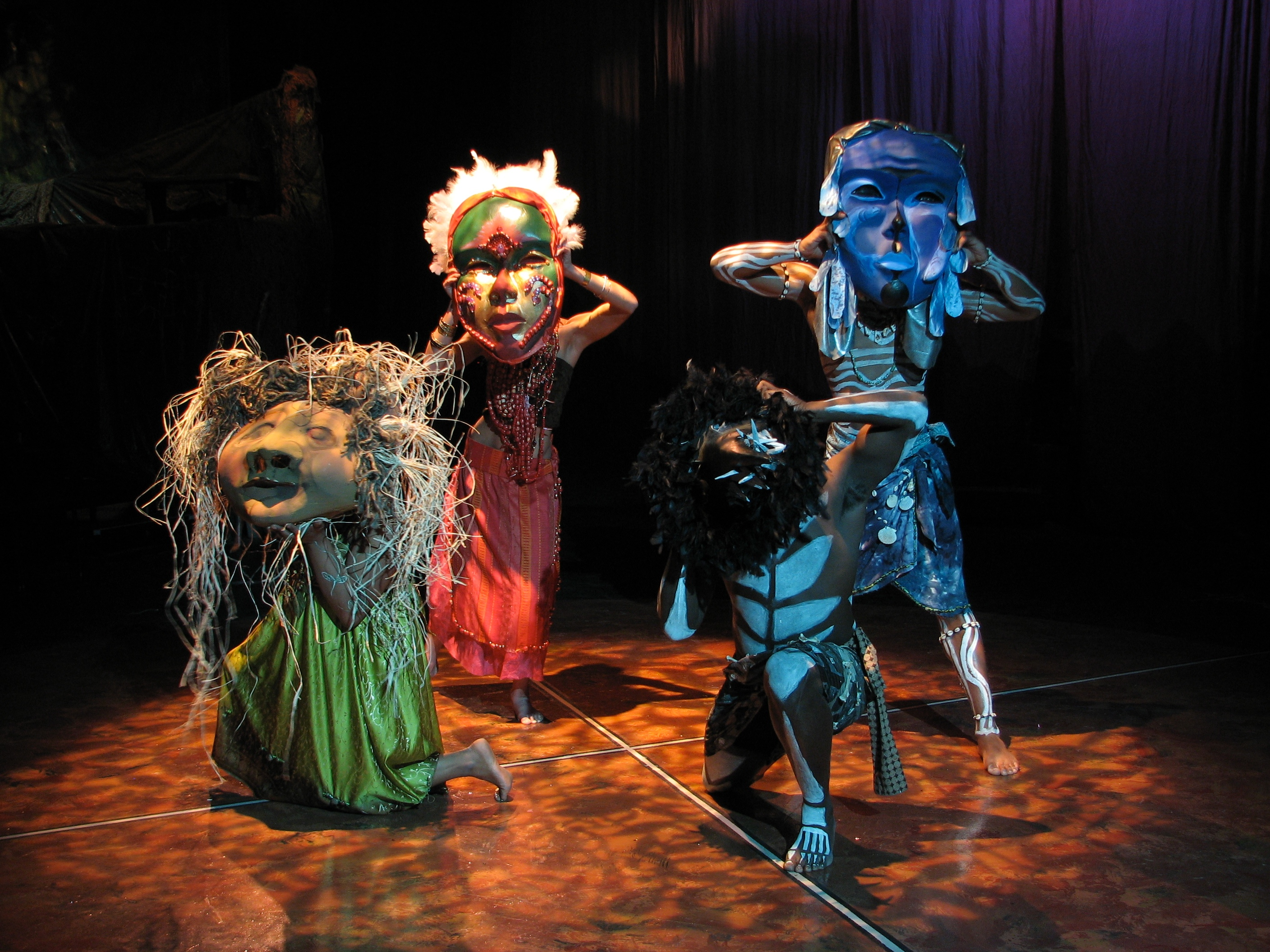
Clockwise from left, Asaka, Erzulie, Agwe, and Papa Ge, from the Alfred University production.

One stormy night in the Antilles archipelago, thunder booms, making a small girl cry in fear. To comfort her, the village storytellers tell her the story of Ti Moune, a peasant girl who falls in love with a grand homme, Daniel Beauxhomme – a story of life, pain, love, grief, faith, and hope. In this story, four gods (consisting of Asaka: Mother of the Earth, Agwé: god of Water, Erzulie: goddess of Love, and Papa Ge: demon of Death) rule an island known as the Jewel of the Antilles where poor peasants worship them (Prologue/"We Dance"). The peasants, "black as night", live on one side of the island, and the grands hommes, lighter-skinned descendants of the original French planters and their slaves, live on the other. One night, Agwe unleashes a terrible storm upon the island, which in turn causes a disastrous flood, wiping out many villages. However, the gods save the life of a little orphan named Ti Moune by placing her in a tree above the flood's waves. She is found and subsequently adopted by the peasants Mama Euralie and Tonton Julian ("One Small Girl").

Years afterwards, a grown-up Ti Moune prays to the gods to let her know her purpose, and to let her be like the fast-driving strangers on the roads near her village - the grands hommes ("Waiting for Life"). Hearing her plea, the gods laugh at her. However, Erzulie suggests that they give her love, because it is stronger than any of the other elements. Offended, Papa Ge proposes a bet to prove which is stronger: love or death. Agwe arranges for the car of Daniel Beauxhomme, a young grand homme, to crash during a storm so that Ti Moune may meet Daniel and restore him to health ("And the Gods Heard Her Prayer/Rain"). Despite the objections of the other peasants including her own parents, Ti Moune helps the intruder recover ("Pray"). Ti Moune falls in love with the stranger and as she cares for the unconscious boy, she imagines he loves her too. When Papa Ge comes to take Daniel's life, Ti Moune offers her life in exchange for Daniel's so that he will not die ("Forever Yours"). Papa Ge is angry but leaves, hinting he will return – sooner or later, as her life now belongs to him.

Tonton Julian travels to the other side of the Island to seek Daniel's family at the Hotel Beauxhomme. When he returns, he brings with him some of Daniel's people to take the boy back, as well as the story of Daniel's family: Four generations ago, during the Napoleonic era, a French aristocrat named Armand colonised the island. Although Armand had a wife, he had affairs with several natives, one of which bore him a son, named Beauxhomme. When Beauxhomme grew up, war broke out between the peasant locals and the French. The peasants won the war with Beauxhomme's help, after which he banished Armand back to France. Before leaving, however, Armand cursed Beauxhomme and his descendants saying their "black blood will keep them forever on the island, while their hearts yearn forever for France." To this day the curse causes future Beauxhommes to alienate the peasants for reminding them of their homeland ("The Sad Tale of the Beauxhommes"). Ti Moune is tearfully separated from Daniel and tells her parents that she will go after Daniel to marry him, and though they are reluctant to let her go, they eventually give her their blessing ("Ti Moune"). The goddess Asaka tells Ti Moune not to fear, as the Earth will give her everything she needs on her journey to Daniel ("Mama Will Provide").

Ti Moune travels across the island ("Waiting for Life (Reprise)"), and the storytellers relate the many versions of her difficult journey to the city (including being forced to wear too-tight shoes), through the hotel gates and finding Daniel's room ("Some Say"). Daniel, still ill and unable to walk, does not remember her but believes her after she describes the scar on his chest. As they stay together, Erzulie gives them the gift of love ("Human Heart"). Daniel ignores the townspeople's gossiping ("Pray (Reprise)") over the unlikely relationship between a rich Beauxhomme and a poor peasant. Daniel delights in Ti Moune's differences from the rich girls in his life, noting that "some girls you marry, some you love" ("Some Girls").

At a ball held at the hotel ("The Ball"), Andrea Devereaux, a daughter of Daniel's family friends, cajoles Ti Moune to dance for them (her ulterior motive being to make her look bad in front of the grands hommes). Ti Moune does dance and gains the admiration of the rich society members, inspiring both the peasant servants and the grand homme guests to join her ("Ti Moune's Dance"). Afterwards, Ti Moune learns that Daniel is already engaged to be married to Andrea ("When We Are Wed"). Daniel, reminded of his responsibilities, must go through with the arranged marriage, although he insists they can be lovers forever, leaving Ti Moune crushed. Papa Ge reappears and reminds Ti Moune of her promise to exchange her life for Daniel's – but says she can revoke the bargain if she kills Daniel ("Promises/Forever Yours (Reprise)"). Ti Moune enters Daniel's room with a knife, but she still loves him too much to kill him, proving love is stronger than death. However, Daniel finds Ti Moune with the knife. Appalled at the attempted murder, the Beauxhommes throw her out of the hotel grounds.

Barred from the hotel, Ti Moune waits for two weeks to try and meet Daniel at the gate. As Daniel and Andrea are married, they follow an old tradition of throwing coins to the peasants outside the hotel gates. Ti Moune calls to Daniel who gently places a silver coin in Ti Moune's hand, kisses her cheek, and leaves. The storytellers tell of how the gods were moved to tears by Ti Moune's selflessness and love, and chose to bestow a final kindness on her; Erzulie took her by the hand and led her to the ocean, where Agwé allowed her to drown peacefully. Papa Ge received her gently and brought her back to shore where Asaka transformed her into a tree ("A Part of Us").

The tree becomes a celebration of life and love that cracks open the gates of the hotel, allowing those of all social statuses to become one, including a peasant girl and a young grand homme, Daniel's son, as they play in her branches. As the years go by, the story of Ti Moune is told again and again, passed down through generations as proof of the power of love and stories to bring people together. As the musical ends, the little girl who was frightened by the storm begins to retell the story herself ("Why We Tell the Story").

== Characters ==
- Ti Moune – A peasant girl.
  - Little Ti Moune – Ti Moune as a child.
- Daniel Beauxhomme – A grand homme (French for "upper class"); Ti Moune's love interest; Beauxhomme is French for "beautiful man"
- Papa Ge – The sly Demon of Death who is the main antagonist of the show. He tricks the main character into giving her life for another. He is seen as a skeleton and is very sneaky. The people on the island fear him because of what he represents: the unknown that is death.
- Erzulie – Beautiful Goddess of Love; the foil to Papa Ge
- Agwe – God of Water
- Asaka – Mother of the Earth
- Mama Euralie – Ti Moune's adoptive mother
- Tonton Julian – Ti Moune's adoptive father
- Andrea Deveraux – Daniel's promised wife; also "Madame Armand"
- Armand Beauxhomme – Daniel's stern father.
- "Armand" – The ancestor of Armand Beauxhomme.
- Gatekeeper – The Hotel Beauxhomme's fierce guard (commonly played by Armand).
- The Little Girl – A young girl who is told the story of Ti Moune.
- Daniel's Son – Daniel's young son (commonly played by Daniel's actor).
- Storytellers/Gossips – Various Grands Hommes and peasants (in most productions, the storytellers are shown as also performing the parts of the Gods).

Note: The original cast was chosen along racial lines with darker-skinned actors portraying the peasants and lighter-skinned actors portraying the upper-class landowners. In the script, the writers provide small line changes that can be used to remove references to skin color to accommodate multi-ethnic productions, while preserving the storyline about differences between the upper and lower classes.

== Original casts ==
Character	Off-Broadway	Broadway	West End	Broadway Revival	National Tour
Character	1990		1994	2017	2019
Ti Moune	LaChanze	LaChanze	Lorna Brown	Hailey Kilgore	Courtnee Carter
Daniel Beauxhomme	Jerry Dixon	Jerry Dixon	Anthony Corriete	Isaac Cole Powell	Tyler Hardwick
Asaka	Kecia Lewis	Kecia Lewis	Sharon D. Clarke	Alex Newell	Kyle Ramar Freeman
Agwe	Milton Craig Nealy	Milton Craig Nealy	Trevor Michael Georges	Quentin Earl Darrington	Jahmaul Bakare
Erzulie	Andrea Frierson-Toney	Andrea Frierson-Toney	P. P. Arnold	Lea Salonga	Cassondra Kellam
Papa Ge	Eric Riley	Eric Riley	Clive Rowe	Merle Dandridge	Tamyra Gray
Mama Euralie	Sheila Gibbs	Sheila Gibbs	Shezwae Powell	Kenita R. Miller	Danielle Lee Greaves
Tonton Julian	Ellis Williams	Ellis Williams	Johnny Worthy	Phillip Boykin	Phillip Boykin
Andrea Deveraux	Nikki Rene	Nikki Rene	Suzanne Packer	Alysha Deslorieux	Briana Brooks
Armand Beauxhomme	Gerry McIntyre	Gerry McIntyre	Mark Vincent	David Jennings	George L. Brown
Little Ti Moune	Afi Bijou	Afi Bijou	Monique Mason^{1}	Emerson Davis; Mia Williamson	Mimi Crossland; Mariama Diop

1. Elizabeth Kerr originated the role but Mason replaced her during the Birmingham Repertory run and subsequently transferred to the West End.

=== Notable replacements ===
Broadway (1990–1991)

- Asaka: Lillias White
- Tonton Julian: James Stovall

Broadway revival (2017–2019)

- Agwe: Norm Lewis
- Papa Ge: Tamyra Gray
- Ti Moune: Loren Lott
- Erzulie: Michelle Williams

== Musical numbers ==
Title	Cast	Recordings		
Title	Cast	Broadway (1990)	London (1994) (Note: Includes bonus remix track of "The Human Heart", performed by P. P. Arnold (Erzulie).)	Broadway revival (2017)
"We Dance"	Storytellers	Yes	Yes	Yes
"One Small Girl"	Mama Euralie, Tonton Julian, Little Ti Moune, and Storytellers	Yes	Yes	Yes
"Waiting for Life"	Ti Moune and Storytellers	Yes	Yes	Yes
"And the Gods Heard Her Prayer"	Asaka, Agwe, Erzulie, and Papa Ge	Yes	Yes	Yes
"Rain"	Agwe and Storytellers	Yes	Yes	Yes
"Discovering Daniel"	Ti Moune and Storytellers	No	Yes	Yes
"Pray"	Ti Moune, Mama Euralie, Tonton Julian, Guard and Storytellers	Yes	Yes	Yes
"Forever Yours"	Ti Moune, Daniel and Papa Ge	Yes	Yes	Yes
"The Sad Tale of the Beauxhommes"	Armand and Storytellers	Yes	Yes	Yes
"Ti Moune"	Ti Moune, Mama Euralie, Tonton Julian	Yes	Yes	Yes
"Mama Will Provide"	Asaka and Storytellers	Yes	Yes	Yes
"Waiting for Life" (Reprise)" (Note: Included in production, but not recordings.)	Ti Moune	No	No	No
"Some Say"	Storytellers	Yes	Yes	Yes
"The Human Heart"	Erzulie and Storytellers	Yes	Yes	Yes
"Pray" (Reprise) (Note: "Gossip" replaces "Pray" (Reprise) for the Broadway revival (2017).)	Storytellers	Yes	Yes	No
"Gossip" (Note: Not included in the original Broadway production.)	Storytellers	No	No	Yes
"Some Girls"	Daniel	Yes	Yes	Yes
"The Ball"	Andrea, Daniel, Ti Moune, and Storytellers	Yes	Yes	Yes
"Ti Moune's Dance"	Erzulie, Asaka, Agwe, Papa Ge, and Storytellers	Yes	Yes	Yes
"When We Are Wed"	Andrea, Daniel and Ti Moune	Yes	Yes	Yes
"Promises"	Papa Ge, Ti Moune, and Storytellers	No	Yes	No
"Forever Yours" (Reprise)	Papa Ge, Ti Moune, Erzulie, and Storytellers	Yes	Yes	Yes
"Wedding Sequence"	Papa Ge, Ti Moune, and Storytellers	No	Yes	No
"A Part of Us"	Mama Euralie, Tonton Julian, Little Ti Moune, and Storytellers	Yes	Yes	Yes
"Why We Tell the Story"	Storytellers	Yes	Yes	Yes

Notes

Cut songs include "Come Down From the Tree" and "When Daniel Marries". "Come Down From the Tree", was a song for Mama Euralie; it is included in several recordings, including its first recording on Bruce Kimmel's Lost in Boston CD, where it was sung by Lillias White - it was also included on Audra McDonald's How Glory Goes.

== Awards and nominations ==
=== Original Broadway production ===
Year	Award	Category	Nominee	Result
1991	Tony Award	Best Musical		Nominated
1991	Tony Award	Best Book of a Musical	Lynn Ahrens	Nominated
1991	Tony Award	Best Original Score	Stephen Flaherty and Lynn Ahrens	Nominated
1991	Tony Award	Best Performance by a Featured Actress in a Musical	LaChanze	Nominated
1991	Tony Award	Best Direction of a Musical	Graciela Daniele	Nominated
1991	Tony Award	Best Choreography	Graciela Daniele	Nominated
1991	Tony Award	Best Costume Design	Judy Dearing	Nominated
1991	Tony Award	Best Lighting Design	Allen Lee Hughes	Nominated
1991	Drama Desk Award	Outstanding Actress in a Musical	LaChanze	Nominated
1991	Theatre World Award		LaChanze	Won

=== Original London production ===
Year	Award	Category	Nominee	Result
1995	Laurence Olivier Award	Best New Musical		Won
1995	Laurence Olivier Award	Best Performance in a Supporting Role in a Musical	Sharon D. Clarke	Nominated
1995	Laurence Olivier Award	Best Director of a Musical	David Toguri and Gwenda Hughes	Nominated
1995	Laurence Olivier Award	Best Theatre Choreographer	David Toguri	Nominated

=== 2017 Broadway revival ===
Year	Award	Category	Nominee	Result
2018	Tony Awards	Best Revival of a Musical		Won
2018	Tony Awards	Best Actress in a Musical	Hailey Kilgore	Nominated
2018	Tony Awards	Best Direction of a Musical	Michael Arden	Nominated
2018	Tony Awards	Best Scenic Design in a Musical	Dane Laffrey	Nominated
2018	Tony Awards	Best Costume Design in a Musical	Clint Ramos	Nominated
2018	Tony Awards	Best Lighting Design in a Musical	Jules Fisher and Peggy Eisenhauer	Nominated
2018	Tony Awards	Best Sound Design	Peter Hylenski	Nominated
2018	Tony Awards	Best Orchestrations	AnnMarie Millazo and Michael Starobin	Nominated
2018	Drama Desk Awards	Outstanding Revival of a Musical		Nominated
2018	Drama Desk Awards	Outstanding Featured Actress in a Musical	Kenita R. Miller	Nominated
2018	Drama Desk Awards	Outstanding Choreography	Camille A. Brown	Nominated
2018	Drama Desk Awards	Outstanding Orchestrations	AnnMarie Milazzo and Michael Starobin (John Bertles and Bash the Trash, found instrument design)	Nominated
2018	Drama Desk Awards	Outstanding Set Design for a Musical	Dane Laffrey	Nominated
2018	Drama Desk Awards	Outstanding Costume Design for a Musical	Clint Ramos	Nominated
2018	Drama Desk Awards	Outstanding Lighting Design for a Musical	Jules Fisher and Peggy Eisenhauer	Won
2018	Theatre World Award		Hailey Kilgore	Honoree
2019	Grammy Awards	Best Musical Theater Album		Nominated

== Film adaptation ==
On July 30, 2020, it was announced that Walt Disney Pictures and producer Marc Platt bought the film rights to adapt Once on This Island into a feature film for the Disney+ streaming service. Playwright Jocelyn Bioh will pen the script and Wanuri Kahiu will direct.
