= DJ Cassidy =

Disc jockey, record producer and MC (born 1981)

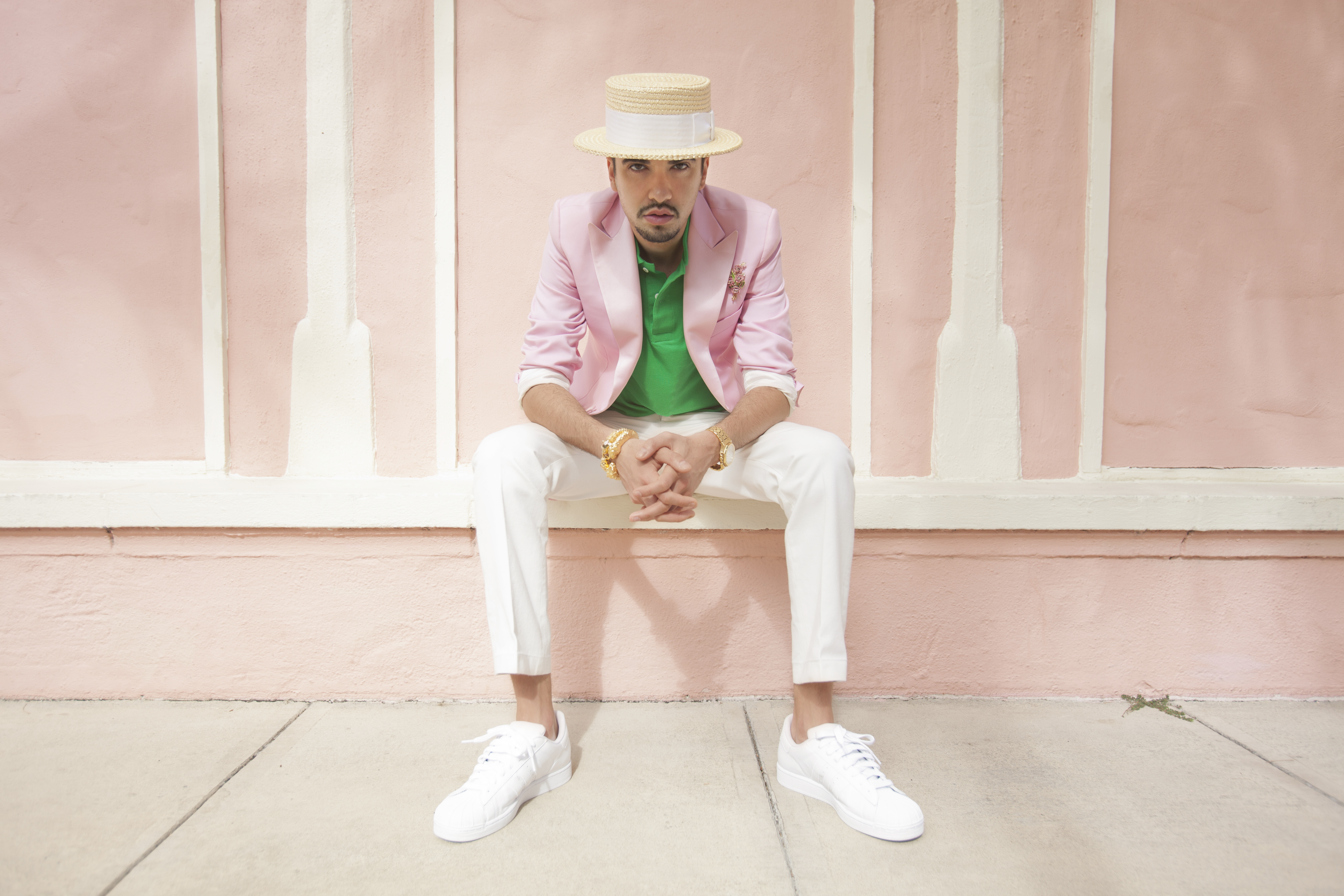
- Photographed in 2014 by Lyle Owerko

Background information
- Born: Cassidy Podell; June 27, 1981 (age 45); New York City, U.S.
- Occupations: Disc jockey; record producer
- Website: www.djcassidy.com

Cassidy Durango Milton Willy Podell (born June 27, 1981), known professionally as DJ Cassidy, is an American DJ and record producer.

Noted for his flashy attire, Cassidy became known for his work at celebrity functions, including the 2008 wedding of Beyoncé and Jay-Z, the 2009 inauguration of President Barack Obama, President Obama's 50th birthday party, and the 2024 Democratic National Convention roll call.

== Early life and education ==
Born in New York's Upper East Side, Cassidy is the second child of Monica Podell, née Faust, and music agent Jonny Podell. Cassidy's sister, Brittany, was born in 1977. At the time of Cassidy's birth, Jonny Podell was a booking agent for Norby Walters Associates; he became head of music at ICM in 1996. He and Monica Podell separated in 1982.

Interested in deejaying from an early age, Cassidy said he had always been a "hip-hop kid". As a child, he watched dance films such as Breakin' and Breakin' 2: Electric Boogaloo, and later loved Grandmaster Flash, Kool Herc, and Afrika Bambaataa. His tenth birthday present was two turntables and a mixer. He began by working at teenage parties, school carnivals, and talent shows then, from his senior year, in nightclubs.

In 1999 he began his undergraduate studies at George Washington University before transferring to New York University, where he majored in sociology and graduated in 2003.

== Performances ==
Cassidy was discovered by Sean Combs while working the 10–4 night shift at a GQ party in the basement of Lotus, a club in Manhattan. Combs wrote his phone number on a napkin and asked Cassidy to call him, which led Cassidy to work at the 2001 wedding of Jennifer Lopez and Cris Judd, as well as Grammy parties and the MTV Video Music Awards. As of 2011, according to Forbes, Cassidy was performing 200 gigs a year, sometimes earning $100,000 a night. MusicRadar reported in 2014 that he used two CDJ 2000 digital turntables by Pioneer Electronics, a Pioneer DJM-900, in-ear headphones custom-made by JH Audio, and a 24-carat-gold microphone custom-made by Shure.

Known for wearing boaters, cricket sweaters and tuxedos, often in pink and green, Cassidy worked at parties hosted by Oprah Winfrey and Anna Wintour and at the weddings of Beyoncé, Jennifer Lopez, and Kim Kardashian. After he worked at the opening party in 2009 for Oprah Winfrey's girls' school in South Africa, she recommended him to the Obamas. This led to him working at President Obama's first inauguration ball in 2009, at the president's and Michelle Obama's 50th birthday parties, and at the 2012 Democratic National Convention.

He then performed at the Inauguration of Joe Biden in 2021. In the performance Celebrating America, he performed along with Luis Fonsi and Ozuna. In August 2024, he performed on the second day of the 2024 Democratic National Convention, providing music for each state during the roll call of state delegations.

== Music ==
=== Singles ===
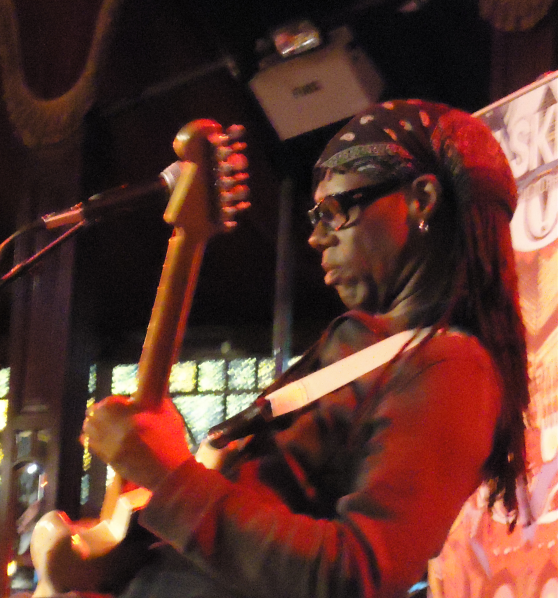
On Calling All Hearts", Nile Rodgers of Chic played the same guitar as on Chic's "Good Times" and Sister Sledge's "We Are Family".

Cassidy said in 2013 that he was working on his first album, Paradise Royale, which would capture the architecture of 1978–1982 dance music; he called this "the greatest and most universal dance music of all time". He planned to bring together a 14-piece string section and 22 of the world's most notable musicians from that period. He created an iTunes playlist of 25 songs recorded between 1978 and 1982, then tried to make his music sound like those songs. He realized that the producers had repeatedly used the same musicians. Those are the musicians he sought to recruit.

The first single, "Calling All Hearts", sung by Robin Thicke and Jessie J, was released in the US on iTunes in February 2014. It featured Nile Rodgers on guitar, Verdine White on bass, Philip Bailey on percussion and background vocals, Larry Dunn on keyboards, John "JR" Robinson on drums, and Jerry Hey on horns and strings. The video, with a 13-piece band performing on a pink heart-shaped stage, was directed by Director X and shot in London.

Director X also directed the video for Cassidy's second single, "Make the World Go Round", which was shot on an elevated train in Chicago. Featuring R. Kelly, the single was released in the US in April 2014. On "Calling All Hearts", Nile Rodgers played the same guitar as on Chic's "Good Times" and Sister Sledge's "We Are Family". On "Make the World Go Round", Ndugu Chancler used the same drums as on Michael Jackson's "Billie Jean".

=== Discography ===
| Single | Year | Chart positions | | | |
| Single | Year | US Dance | BEL (FL) (Tip) | BEL (WA) (Tip) | SCO |
|---|---|---|---|---|---|
| "Calling All Hearts" (featuring Robin Thicke and Jessie J) | 2014 | 9 | 6 | 14 | 7 |
| "Make the World Go Round" (featuring R. Kelly) | 2014 | — | — | — | — |
| "Future Is Mine" (featuring Chromeo) | 2015 | — | — | — | — |
| "Kill the Lights" (with Alex Newell and Jess Glynne, featuring Nile Rodgers) | 2016 | 1 | — | — | — |
| "Honor" (featuring Grace and Lil Yachty) | 2017 | — | — | — | — |

== See also ==
- List of club DJs
