= Stronger (Clean Bandit song) =

2015 single by Clean Bandit

Single by Clean Bandit featuring Alex Newell and Sean Bass

from the album New Eyes (Special Edition)
- Released: 19 April 2015
- Genre: Funky house; dance; deep house; synth-pop; classical crossover
- Length: 3:41
- Label: Atlantic; Warner
- Songwriter(s): Jack Patterson; Grace Chatto; Oliver Thornton; George Moore
- Producer(s): Clean Bandit

Clean Bandit singles chronology
| "Real Love" (2014) | "Stronger" (2015) | "Tears" (2016) |

Alex Newell singles chronology
| "Nobody to Love" (2014) | "Stronger" (2015) | "All Cried Out" (2015) |

Sean Bass singles chronology
| "Stronger" (2015) | "Be Good" (2016) |

Music video
- "Stronger" on YouTube

"Stronger" is a song by the English electronic group Clean Bandit with uncredited vocals by Alex Newell and Sean Bass, the brother of Sharna Bass (who sings the vocals of Clean Bandit's song "Extraordinary"). It was originally released on 22 November 2014, with uncredited vocals from Olly Alexander, the lead singer of Years & Years. The song was then re-recorded and released as a single on 19 April 2015. It was also remixed by the American electronic duo Vindata.

== Music video ==
A contest in collaboration with Microsoft Lumia was held, with the prize being the chance to be a crew member of the music video production. The winners were Wlodek Markowicz and Karol Paciorek from "Lekko Stronniczy".

The video, which was released on 11 March 2015, was made in collaboration with Microsoft, Wlodek Markowicz and Karol Paciorek and featured Microsoft Lumia phones, which were used for the video's bullet time effect, a bus driver singing to the song and dancing to it with others (including Clean Bandit), intermixed with clips of Clean Bandit and a dance group dancing to the song (where the bullet time effect was used). The video was directed by Jack Patterson and produced by Katharine Cowell and had more than 38 million YouTube views by April 2021.

== Track listing ==
Digital download – single
| No. | Title | Length |
|---|---|---|
| 1. | "Stronger" | 3:41 |

Digital download – remixes
| No. | Title | Length |
|---|---|---|
| 1. | "Stronger" (CamelPhat Dark Dub Remix) | 7:21 |
| 2. | "Stronger" (Mike Mago Remix) | 6:34 |
| 3. | "Stronger" (Steve Pitron & Max Sanna Remix) | 6:37 |

== Charts ==
| Chart (2015) | Peak position |
|---|---|
| Belgium (Ultratip Bubbling Under Flanders) | 79 |
| Hungary (Rádiós Top 40) | 37 |
| Japan (Japan Hot 100) | 80 |
| Ireland (IRMA) | 57 |
| Scotland (OCC) | 3 |
| UK Singles (OCC) | 4 |
| UK Dance (OCC) | 1 |

== Certifications ==
| Region | Certification | Certified units/sales |
|---|---|---|
| United Kingdom (BPI) | Silver | 200,000^{‡} |
^{‡} Sales+streaming figures based on certification alone.

== Release history ==
| Region | Date | Format | Label |
|---|---|---|---|
| United Kingdom | 17 April 2015 | Digital download (remixes) | Atlantic; Warner |
| United Kingdom | 19 April 2015 | Digital download (single) | Atlantic; Warner |
