= Jonny Podell =

American talent agent

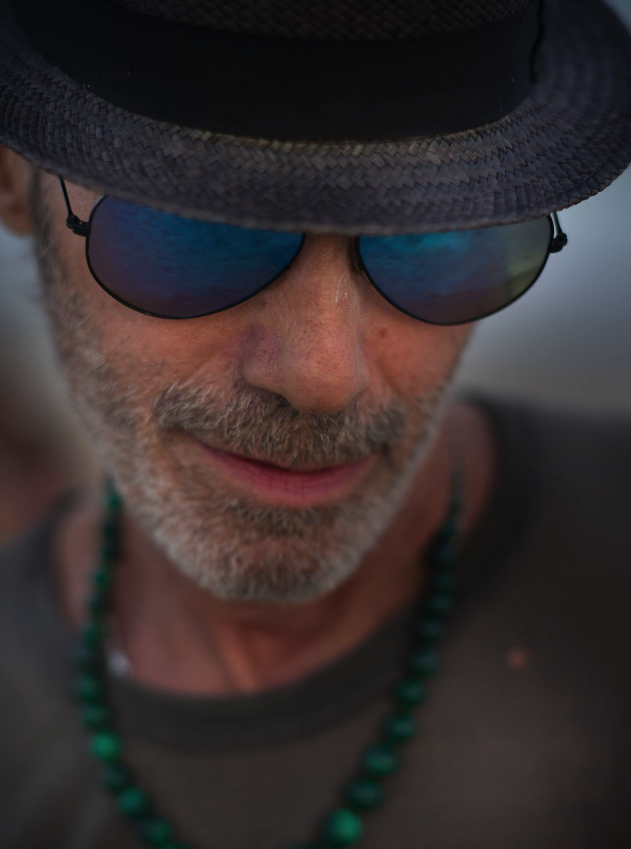

Background information
- Born: New York City, U.S.
- Occupation: Music agent
- Years active: 1969–present
- Website: podelltalent.com

Jonny Podell is an American music agent and owner of the Podell Talent Agency in New York.

Podell's clients include the Allman Brothers Band, Cyndi Lauper, Erasure, Peter Gabriel, Rosie O'Donnell and Yaz. He has also represented Teddy Pendergrass, George Harrison, Crosby, Stills, Nash & Young and David Blaine.

In 1997 Michael Gross, writing in New York Magazine, called Podell "one of the three most powerful agents" in the music business. Podell is the father of DJ Cassidy.

== Biography ==
Podell was born in the Bronx, and attended Forest Hills High School in Queens. After high school he studied at Queens College, City College and New York University, and worked briefly as a teacher at Public School 17 in Brooklyn.

Podell's first job as a music agent was with the Associated Booking Company in 1969. In 1973 he opened his own boutique agency, BMF Enterprises, representing Crosby Stills, Nash & Young, George Harrison, Alice Cooper, Lou Reed, Grayson Hugh and Blondie. He later worked for the William Morris Agency, where in 1989 he became director of East Coast contemporary music.

In 1994 he joined ICM Partners. Two years later he was promoted to lead the company's music division, and was responsible for signing up Michael Bolton, George Clinton, Bijou Phillips, Billy Idol and Meat Loaf. The company also represented Rod Stewart, LL Cool J, Julio Iglesias, Willie Nelson and Michael Flatley.

In the late 1990s Podell founded Evolution Talent Agency with David Zedeck; Evolution's clients included Britney Spears, NSYNC, Backstreet Boys and Sir Ivan. He left Evolution in 2004 to set up his own company, Podell Talent Agency, where he has represented the Allman Brothers Band, Cyndi Lauper, Erasure, Peter Gabriel, Rosie O'Donnell, Van Halen and Yaz. He is the co-founder with Lauper of the non-profit True Colors Fund, which raises awareness of homelessness among LGBT youth.

== Personal life ==
Podell has two children, Brittany and the musician DJ Cassidy, from a previous marriage.

Podell is the subject of "The Johnny Podell Song" by Francis Dunnery.
