= KIPP Academy Lynn =

Coordinates: 42°28′33.96″N 70°55′41.16″W

KIPP Academy Lynn Middle School
- Lynn, Massachusetts; United States

Information
- Type: State Charter
- Established: 2004
- Grades: 5-8
- Enrollment: 487

KIPP Academy Lynn Middle School in the United States provides an environment where the students of Lynn, Massachusetts (a suburb of Boston, Massachusetts) may develop the academic skills, intellectual habits, and character traits necessary to maximize their potential in high school, college, and the world beyond. KIPP Academy Lynn (often referred to as KIPP Lynn) is modeled after the nationally recognized Knowledge Is Power Program in South Bronx, New York and Houston, Texas. It's a free, public middle school that opened its doors on August 9, 2004 to its first class of fifth graders. They added sixth graders in the 2005-2006 school year, and seventh graders in the 2006-2007 school year. KIPP Lynn served grades five through eight since the 2007-2008 school year. It shared the Holy Family Church of Lynn and building two sets of modulars for the two upper grades at KIPP Lynn.

As of June 2008, KIPP Academy Lynn has graduated its founding class of 2012. The students of the Class of 2012 headed off to various Catholic and private schools. Some of the high schools that KIPP Lynn students attended are Northfield Mount Hermon School, Pingree School, Bishop-Fenwick Catholic School, North Cambridge High School, Phillips Exeter Academy, Phillips Academy, and St. Mary's High School of Lynn.

They have been recognized by newspapers across the Boston area such as The Boston Globe and Lynn's local newspaper, The Daily Item

== Other schools in Kipp Massachusetts ==
In August 2011, KIPP opened a high school called "KIPP Academy Lynn Collegiate High School". It was founded with ninety-six 9th graders. They were able to facilitate 10th graders starting in the 2012-2013 school year, 11th graders in the 2013-2014 school year, 12th graders in the 2014-2015 school year where the founding class was the first class of seniors to graduate from a KIPP high school in Massachusetts, and the first group to have benefited from a 5-12th grade education.

KIPP Academy Lynn Elementary was founded in August 2015 to offer K-12th-grade education for KIPP students in Lynn. It started off with Kindergardeners in the 2015-2016 school year. They added 1st graders in the 2016-2017 school year, 2nd graders in the 2017-2018 school year,3rd graders in the 2018-2019 school year, and fourth graders in the 2019-2020 school year.

KIPP Academy Boston Middle School In 2012, KIPP opened KIPP Academy Boston Middle School, the second district in the Massachusetts network. They wanted to expand their reach in the Massachusetts region to the city of Boston. The school is now serving 5-8th grade.

KIPP Academy Boston Elementary School, was founded in the 2014-2015 school year starting with Kindergarteners. They added 1st graders in the 2015-2016 school year, 2nd graders in the 2016-2017 school year, 3rd graders in the 2017-2018 school year, and added fourth graders in the 2018-2019 school year. This campus is part of the new K-8 campus in Mattapan that opened in August 2016. The opening of this school in the Boston network is to offer K-8 education with the goal of opening a high school in Boston soon.
