= Media Theatre =

Theater in Media, Pennsylvania

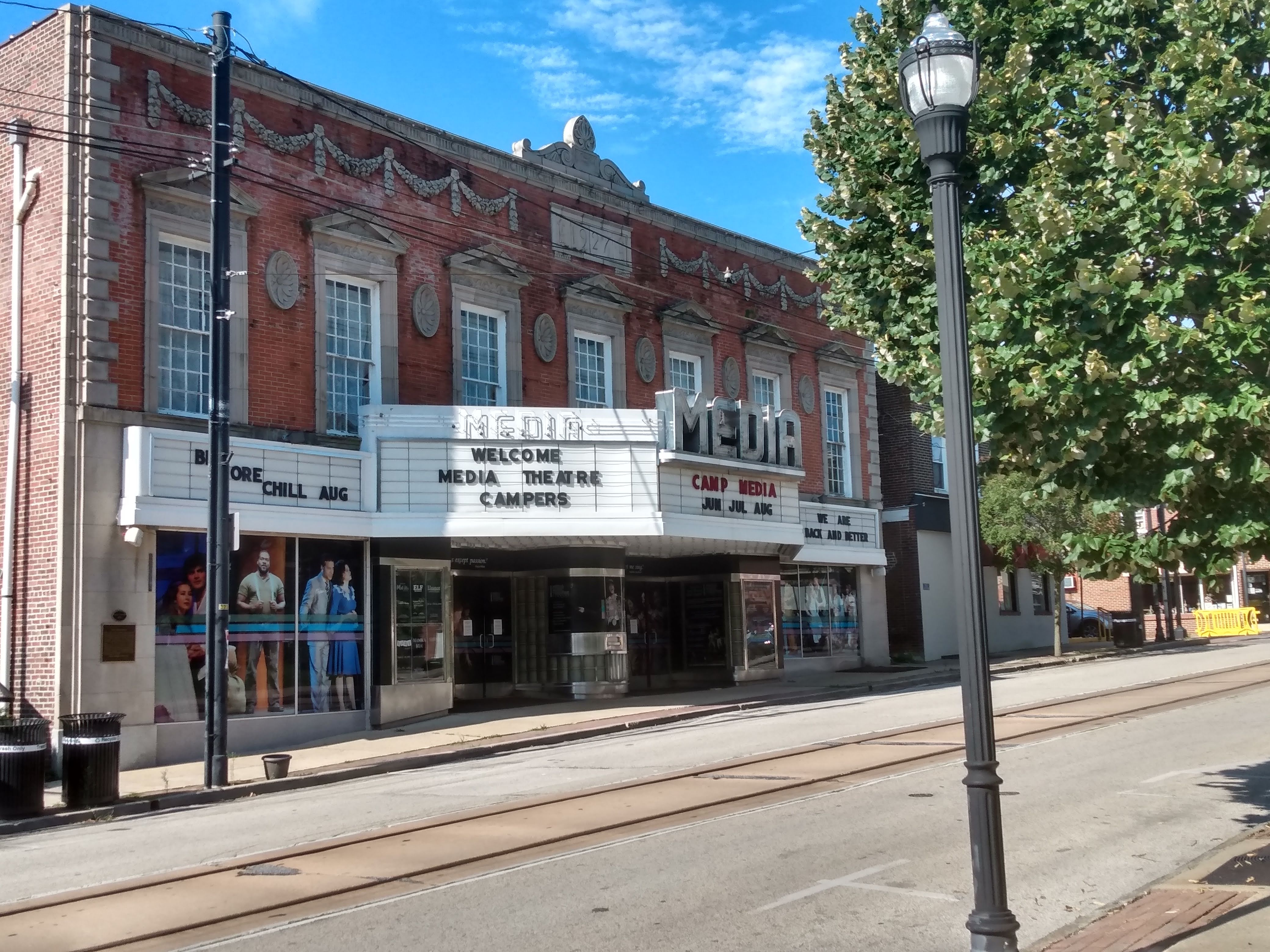
- Address: 104 East State Street; Media, Pennsylvania; United States
- Capacity: 440

Construction
- Opened: 1927
- Reopened: 1994
- Years active: 1927–present

Website
- mediatheatre.org

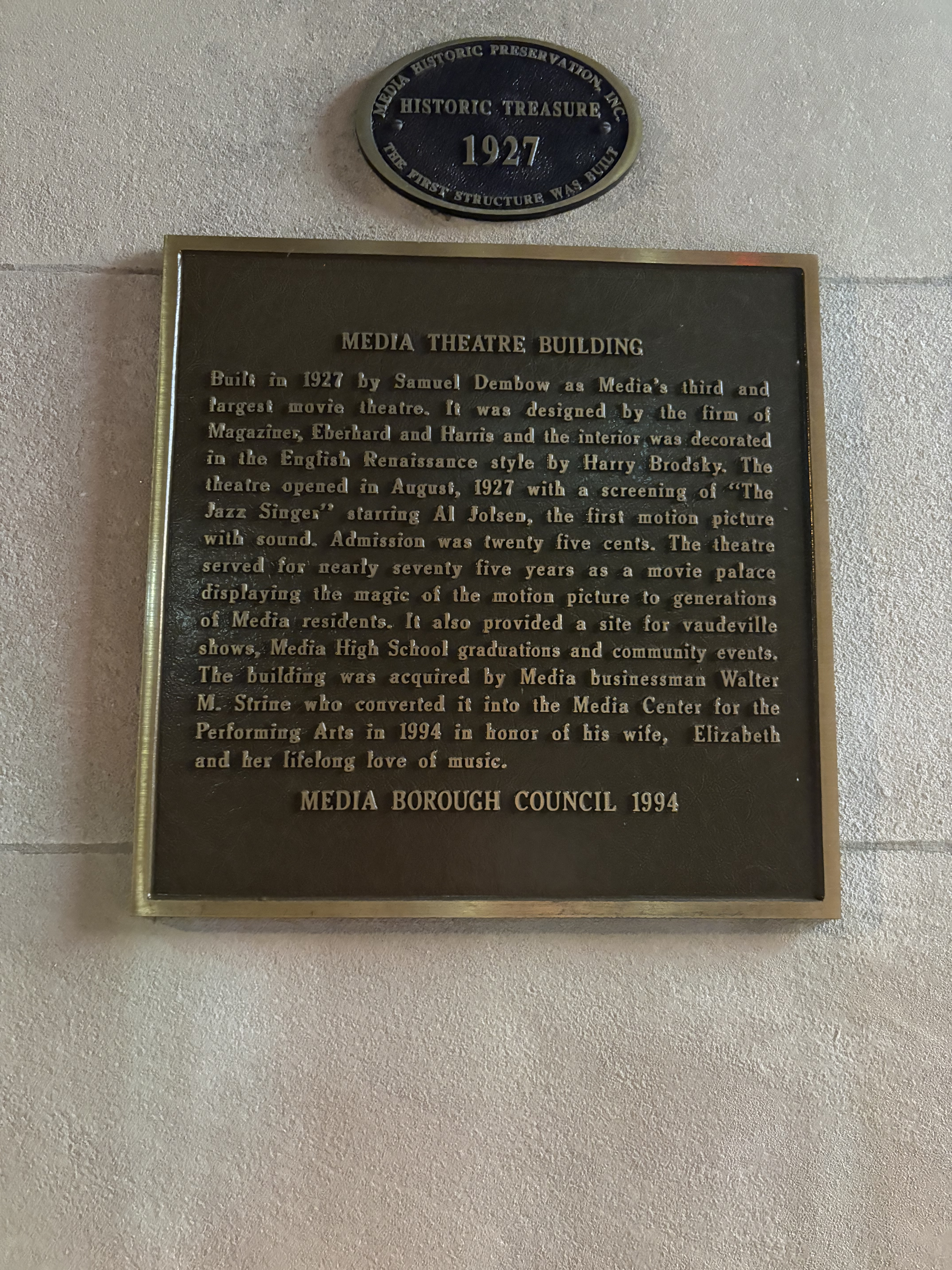
A plaque about the Media Theatre, on the outside of the Media Theatre, photographed in 2025.

The Media Theatre is a 440-seat theater in Media, Pennsylvania, built in 1927 as a vaudeville house and cinema. It is the largest regional professional theater that hires equity actors in Delaware County.

The Media Theatre opened its doors on August 29, 1927, as a cinema decorated in the English Renaissance style. Real estate entrepreneur Walter Strine Sr. purchased the building in the 1970s and leased it to a company that operated it as a movie theater. He closed the theatre in 1990, and began repair work in 1992 to transform it into a performing arts center. The theatre opened on February 8, 1994, with My Fair Lady as its first production. For the building's 70th anniversary in 1997, the Media Theatre hosted Roaring Twenties and 1930s jazz music and productions. SEPTA ran a decorated trolley car to honor the run of the theatre. Strine sold the theatre to the Borough of Media in 2000. The entire enterprise was renamed “Media Music Theatre Company” in 2005. Media Theatre celebrated its 25th anniversary in 2019 with a gala and benefit. In December 2019, the Media Theatre hosted a memorial for Broadway actress and singer Ann Crumb, who frequently performed at the theatre and considered it a "second home".

Since its first performance of My Fair Lady, many musicals have performed at the theatre, including Sunset Boulevard, The Wizard of Oz, Chicago, and Annie. The Molly Maguires had its world-premiere at the theatre, which ended up becoming one of its most popular shows. The theatre also offers classes, camps and productions for children and teens. Despite the coronavirus pandemic in 2020, the children's camp was able to go on with safety precautions.
