= Azaka Medeh =

Loa in Haitiaan Vodou mythology

Zaka (also known by various names such as: Kouzin, Couzen, Azake, Mazaka, Azaka Medeh, Mede, Papa Zaka, Zaka, Papa Zaca, Cousin Zaca, etc.) is the loa of the harvest in Haitian Vodou mythology. Another way to reference this loa is through the name "Azaka Médé".

The Cousin Zaka or Zaka is the loa of the harvest. This loa wears a red handkerchief.

He is said to have evolved after the Haitian Revolution when enslaved people were able to own land. Depicted as a farmer who loves to eat, he is kind and gentle and he has no alternate sinister (petro) form. He is seen as a protector of peasants and defender of the poor, and is identified with Saint Isadore. He is celebrated and affiliated with Labor Day in Haiti (May 1).

The name Zaka is said to have come from the language of the Indigenous Taino people, in which "zada" meant corn, and "maza" meant maize.

Asaka is the loose female interpretation of him as mother of the earth in the Broadway musical Once on This Island. Asaka is the mother of the earth as she oversees plants and all growing things. This goddess is thought to be the reason for flourishing herbs, more plants to cover the earth, and the never-ending production of these plants. She is thought to have a hand in keeping trees green and productive, for all eternity.
