= Gay's Anatomy =

- RuPaul's Drag Race episode
- Gigi Goode and Nicky Doll deciding which acting roles they will choose for the remaining contestants in the Werk Room
- Episode no.: Season 12; Episode 5
- Directed by: Nick Murray
- Presented by: RuPaul
- Original air date: March 27, 2020
- Running time: 62 minutes

Guest appearance
- Normani

Episode chronology
| ← Previous "The Ball Ball" | Next → "Snatch Game" |
- RuPaul's Drag Race season 12

"Gay's Anatomy" is the fifth episode of the twelfth season of the American reality competition television series RuPaul's Drag Race. The episode, directed by Nick Murray, first aired on March 27, 2020, through American cable network VH1. It was followed by an episode of the companion series RuPaul's Drag Race: Untucked.

The episode asks the remaining contestants to overact in a parody based on the medical drama series Grey's Anatomy. Normani serves as a guest judge, alongside regular panelists RuPaul, Michelle Visage, and Carson Kressley. Sherry Pie wins the main challenge. Nicky Doll is eliminated from the competition after placing in the bottom two and losing a lip-sync contest against Heidi N Closet to "Heart to Break" (2018) by Kim Petras.

== Episode ==
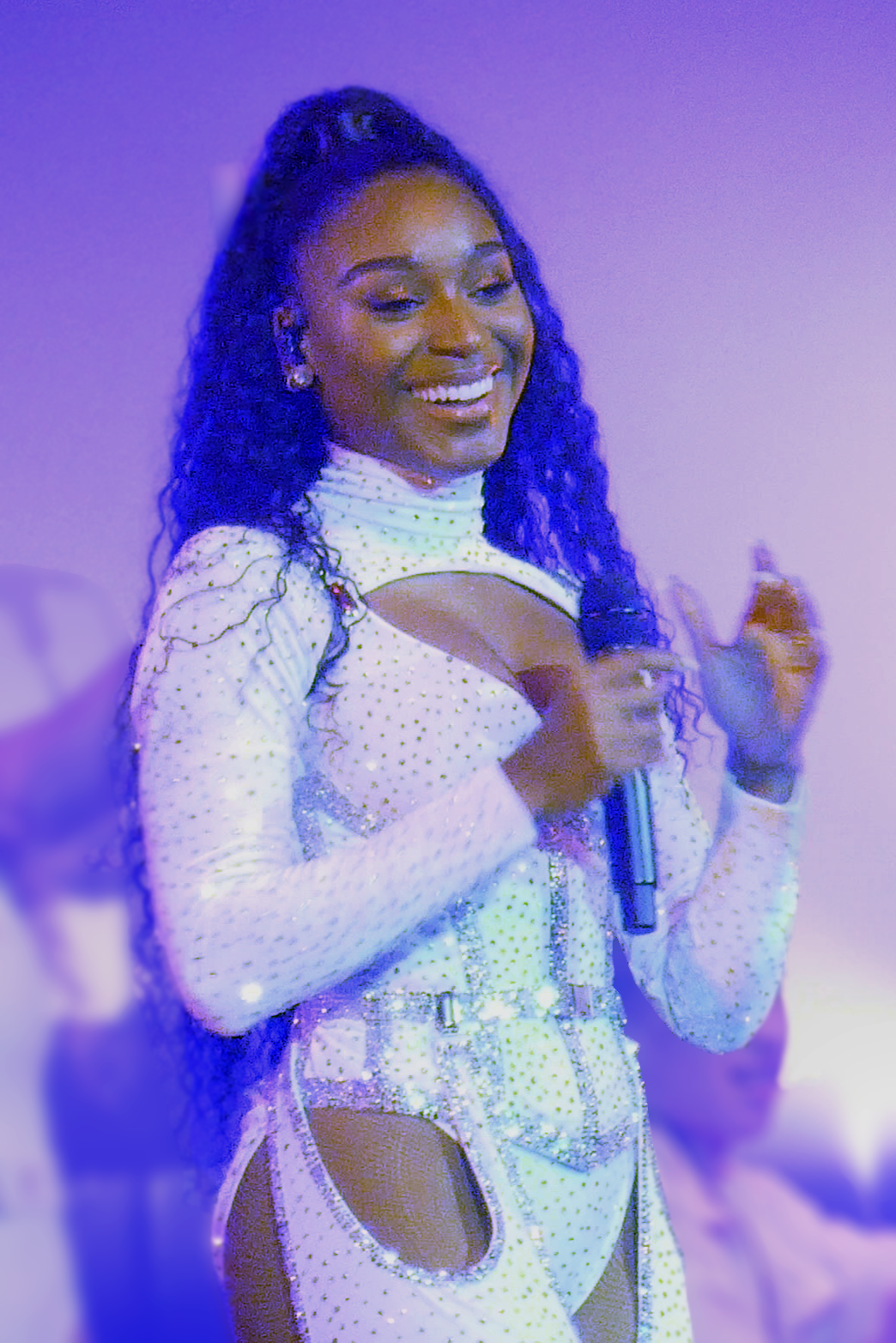
American singer and dancer Normani (pictured in 2019) is a guest judge.

Following Rock M. Sakura's elimination, the remaining eleven contestants—Aiden Zhane, Brita, Crystal Methyd, Gigi Goode, Heidi N Closet, Jackie Cox, Jaida Essence Hall, Jan, Nicky Doll, Sherry Pie, and Widow Von'Du—re-enter the Werk Room and read the eliminated contestant's farewell message. RuPaul announces the fifth challenge, which tasks contestants with overacting in a television parody. Two contestants who receive a pink tablet—Gigi Goode and Nicki Doll—are in charge of the casting roles.

The acting challenge and character roles are a spoof of the American medical drama series Grey's Anatomy. Gigi Goode decides to take the role of Dr. Tizzy Stevens (Izzie Stevens) with Nicki Doll portraying Baby Dearest; Widow Von'Du is assigned to Mimi Dearest. Jackie Cox and Jan are chosen to be Meredith Gay (Meredith Grey). Jaida Essence Hall, Brita, and Sherry Pie are given the roles of Rhonda Shimes (Shonda Rhimes), Dr. Sandra Okurrr (Sandra Oh), and Dr. Mother Gay, respectively.

RuPaul introduces American singer Normani as the guest judge, alongside regular panelist Michelle Visage and alternating judge Carson Kressley. The runway category is "Planet of the Capes", which requires the contestants to present looks with capes. After showcasing the parody film, Aiden Zhane, Gigi Goode, Jan, Jackie Cox, and Widow Von'Du receive positive critiques and are deemed safe. RuPaul declares Sherry Pie the winner of the main challenge, earning her a cash tip of $5,000. (Note: The production company donated $5,000 to The Trevor Project, due to Sherry Pie's disqualification from the reality competition.) The safe contestants leave the main stage to untuck. Brita, Crystal Methyd, Heidi N Closet, Jaida Essence Hall, and Nicky Doll receive negative critiques. RuPaul asks the contestants who should be eliminated from the competition and the majority respond Heidi N Closet or Nicky Doll. Later, the rest of the contestants leave the stage and the judges deliberate.

Heidi N Closet and Nicky Doll place in the bottom two and face off in a lip-sync contest to "Heart to Break" (2018) by Kim Petras. Nicki Doll is eliminated from the competition, and returns to the Werk Room to write a message on the mirror using lipstick for the remaining contestants.

== Production ==
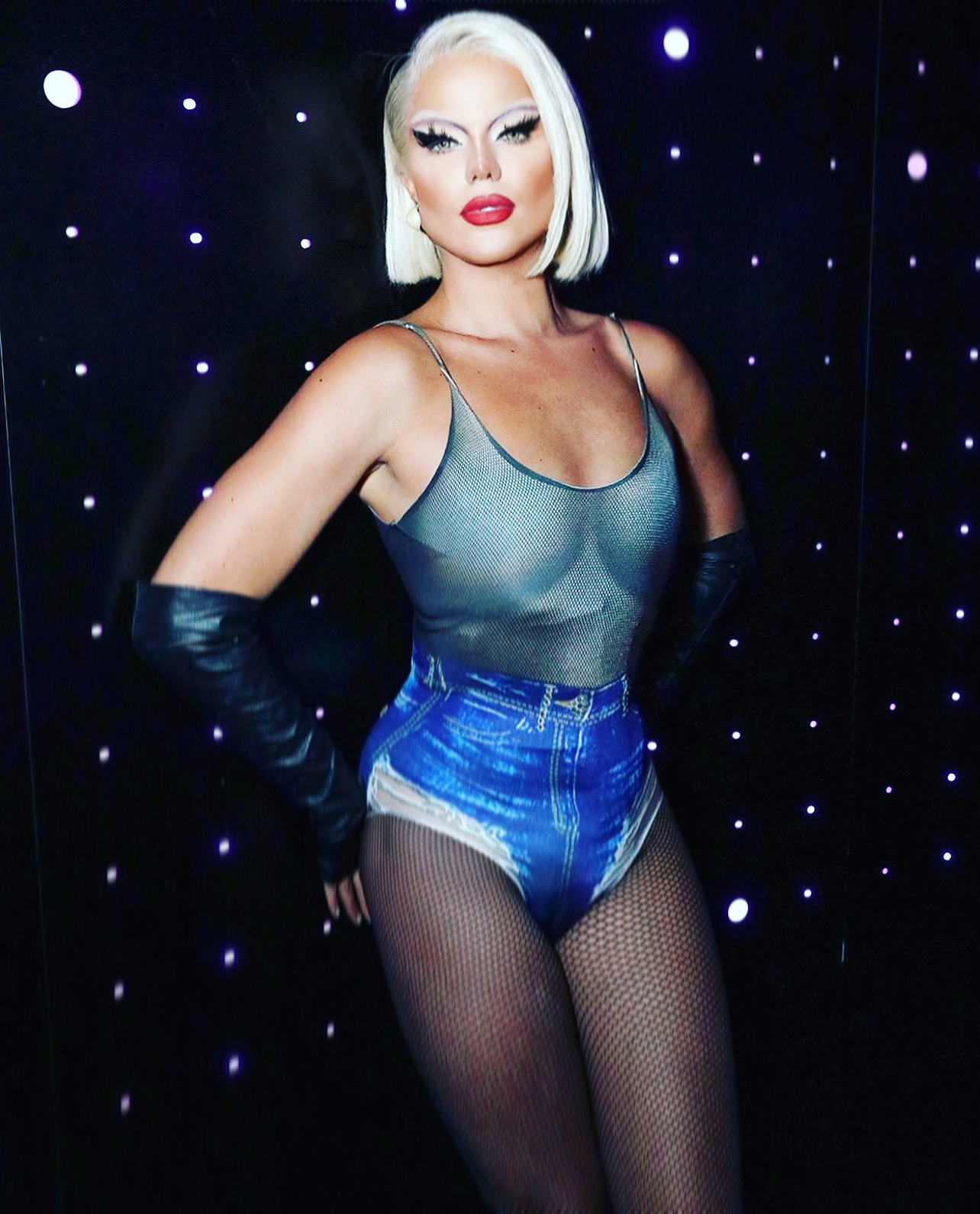
Nicky Doll (pictured in 2022) is eliminated from the competition.

The 63-minute episode was directed by Nick Murray, and originally aired on VH1 in the U.S. on March 27, 2020. The episode's premiere was seen by close to 630,000 viewers. A disclaimer regarding the catfishing allegations against Joey Gugliemelli, also known as Sherry Pie, appears at the beginning of every episode; with the cable network minimizing footage of them aside from winning challenges in episode three and five. World of Wonder, the production company behind the reality competition, donated $5,000 to The Trevor Project due to the disqualified contestant winning the episode.

After its episode premiere, including the companion series, Brita issued an apology on X (formerly Twitter) for her actions towards Aiden Zhane, stating, "It is obviously not okay to bring one of my sisters down just because I was feeling a certain way". Nicky Doll told Gay Times that she "needed to fight twice as hard to show my personality" and felt "like it was an All Stars season."

=== Fashion ===
Aiden Zhane's outfit referenced The Silence of the Lambs (1991), and Gigi Goode showcased a look inspired by Troop Beverly Hills (1989). Sherry Pie wore an Elvis Presley-inspired outfit.

Previously eliminated contestants Dahlia Sin and Rock M. Sakura shared on social media what they would have worn for the runway had they still been in the competition.

== Reception ==
Dylan B. Jones of The Guardian said the episode started with Gigi Goode crying due to the recent elimination and "drag queens crying will never not be good [television] ... second only to Julianne Moore crying". He described the acting challenge as "throwing things up in the air" and noted that Nicky Doll could be up for elimination (the article is written as a "live" blog). He also mentions the rivalry storyline involving Aiden Zhane is too "predictable" and will "start to run thin pretty quick." In a four-out-of-five review, Paul McCallion of Vulture said the acting challenge "cements itself as one of the better installments" such as "Breastworld". McCalliion praised Brita and said he "can attest to the star quality she exudes on stage." Kate Kulzick of The A.V. Club rated the episode a B+ and said the parody draws on many "memorable installments" of Grey's Anatomy. Some contestants were "standouts but [there were] no lowlights". She also criticized the judging panel being "vague". Jom Elauria of Screen Rant included the sketch parody in a list comprising the series 10 best acting challenges in 2022.
