= You Don't Know Me (RuPaul's Drag Race) =

- RuPaul's Drag Race episode
- Episode no.: Season 12; Episode 2
- Original air date: March 6, 2020

Guest appearances
- Thandie Newton (guest judge); Robyn (guest judge); Raven; Zaldy

Episode chronology
| ← Previous "I'm That Bitch" | Next → "World's Worst" |

"You Don't Know Me" is the second episode of the twelfth season of the American television series RuPaul's Drag Race. It originally aired on March 6, 2020. The episode's main challenge tasks contestants with writing, recording, and performing verses to the song "You Don't Know Me". Thandie Newton and Robyn are guest judges. Jaida Essence Hall wins the main challenge, after placing in the top two and winning a lip-sync contest against Sherry Pie to "Call Your Girlfriend" by Robyn. No one is eliminated from the competition.

== Episode ==
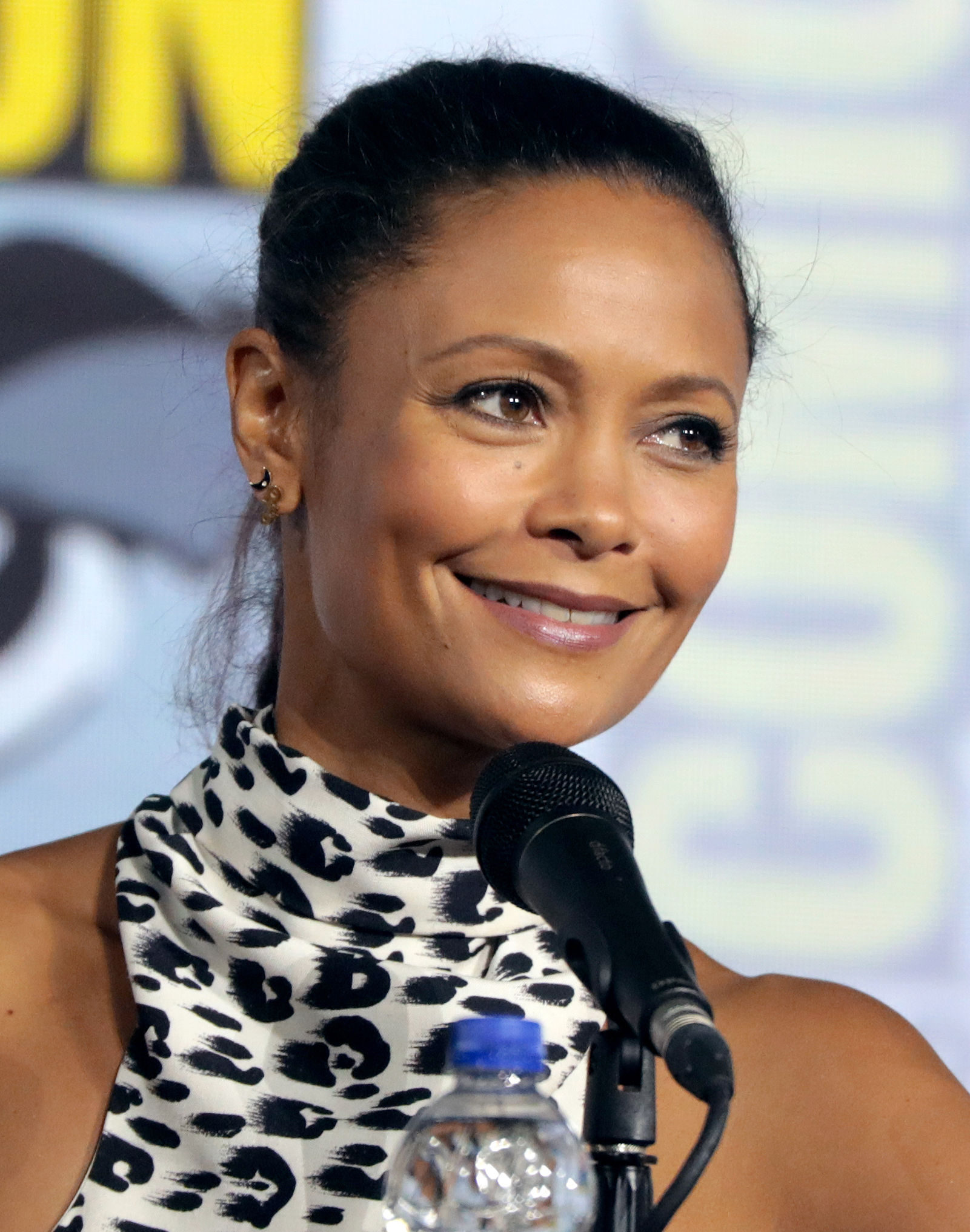
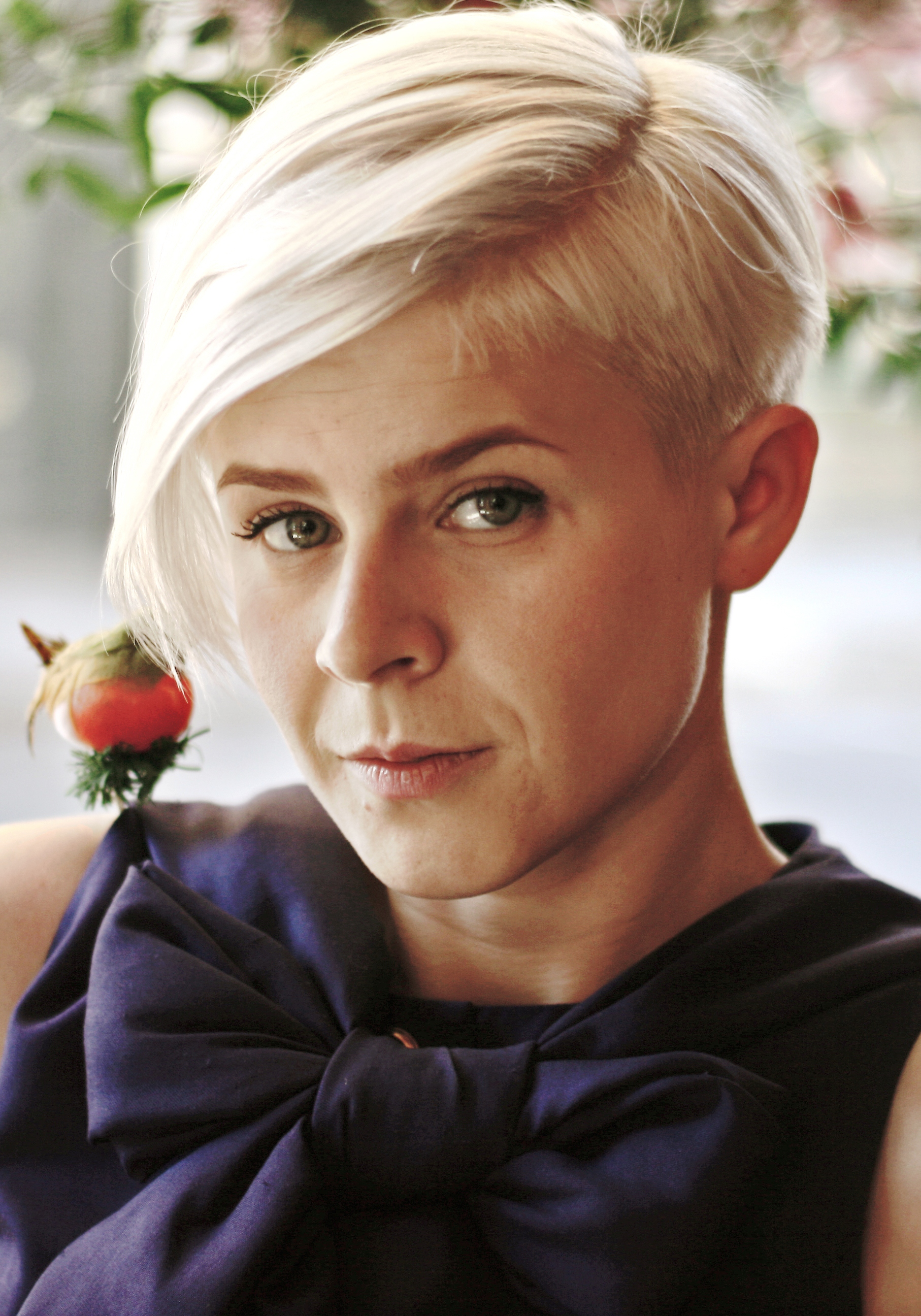
Thandiwe Newton (left) and Robyn (right) are guest judges.

The remaining six contestants enter the Werk Room in the following order: Rock M. Sakura, Dahlia Sin, Sherry Pie, Jan, Jaida Essence Hall, and Aiden Zhane. RuPaul welcomes the group to the competition and reveals the mini-challenge, which tasks contestants with presenting two looks ("Spring" and "Fall") for a fashion show. Watching the show are Ross Matthews, RuPaul, Raven, and Zaldy, as well as impersonators of Anna Sui, Karl Lagerfeld, and André Leon Talley.

After the fashion show, the contestants return to the Werk Room and get out of drag. RuPaul reveals the main challenge, which tasks contestants with writing, recording, and performing verses to the song "You Don't Know Me", along with Bob Fosse-inspired choreography. The contestants rehearse choreography together on the main stage.

Back in the Werk Room, the contestants prepare for the final runway. Rock M. Sakura discusses her struggle with being in leadership roles. On the main stage, RuPaul welcomes fellow panelists Visage and Matthews, as well as guest judges Thandie Newton and Robyn. The contestants perform "You Don't Know Me". The runway category is Tulle. After the contestants present their looks, the judges deliver their critiques, deliberate, then share the results with the group.

Aiden Zhane, Jaida Essence Hall, Jan, and Sherry Pie receive positive critiques. Dahlia Sin and Rock M. Sakura receive negative critiques. Jaida Essence Hall and Sherry Pie are declared the top two contestants of the week and face off in a lip-sync for the win to "Call Your Girlfriend" (2011) by Robyn. Jaida Essence Hall wins and no one is eliminated from the competition.

== Production ==
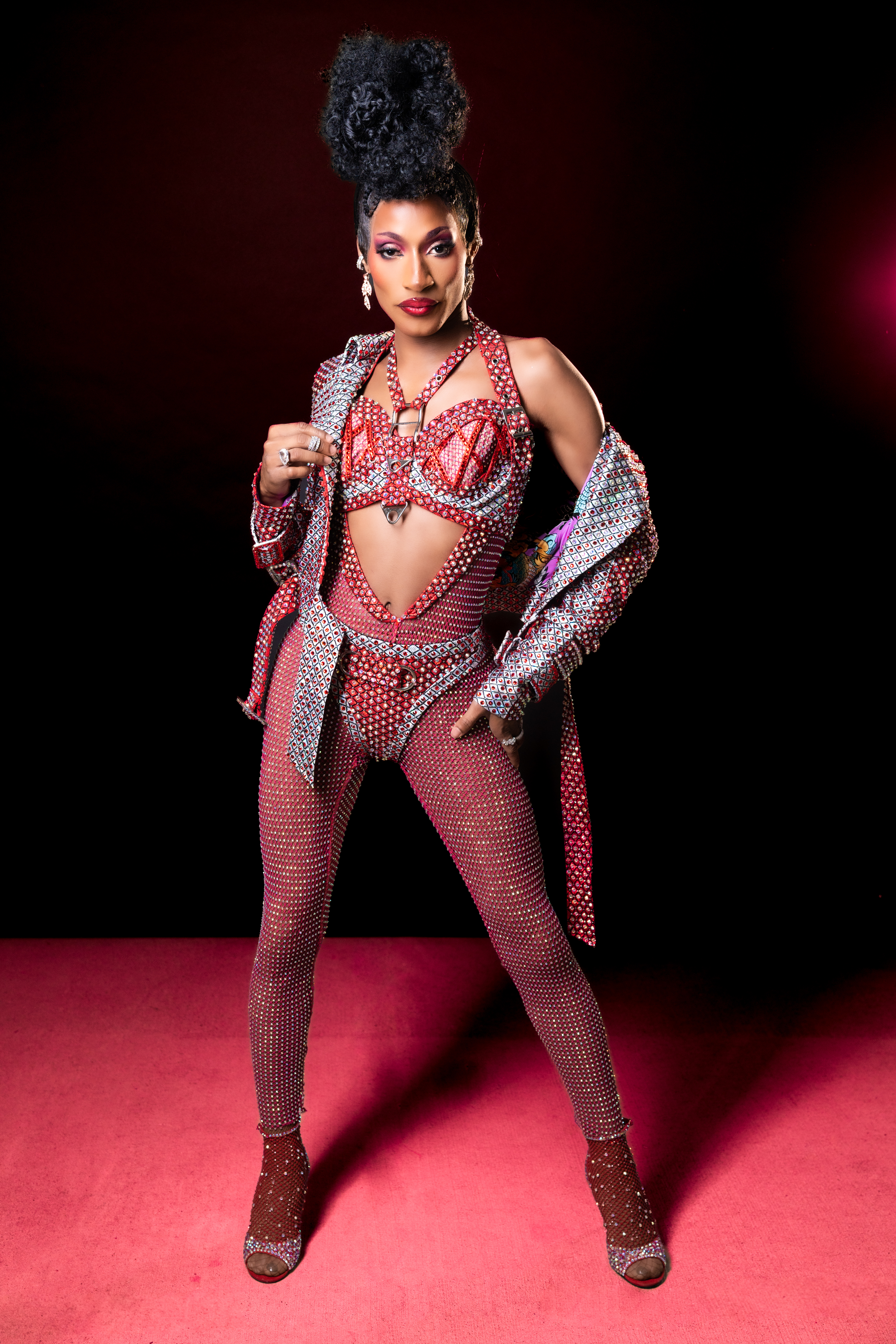
Jaida Essence Hall (pictured in 2022) wins the episode's main challenge.

The episode originally aired on March 6, 2020.

VH1 released a 13-minute preview of the episode beforehand.

=== Fashion ===
For her entrance look, Jan wears a basketball-inspired outfit.

For the "Spring" category in the fashion show, Aiden Zhane wears a headpiece with a flower. Rock M. Sakura's "Fall" look is a blue dress with fish imagery. Jan has an alligator-inspired look and Jaida Essence Hall wears a beret.

For the final runway, Aiden Zhane wears a lime-colored outfit. Dahlia Sin wears red, and Jaida Essence Hall has a yellow dress. Jan's look has a safety vest and she carries a wrench. Sherry Pie's outfit resembles a rain cloud.

== Reception ==
Kate Kulzick of The A.V. Club gave the episode a rating of 'A-'. Emma Kelly of Metro opined, "The Fosse challenge was great, and there were a few good lines in there, but it felt more like a week five maxi challenge rather than a match for the brilliant rap performance of week one. And in the runway, none of the outfits had the same 'bam!' moments as the first take. It's not really the queens' fault, it so just so happens the first premiere set the bar really high." A writer for The Courier called the final runway "unoriginal".

Joey Nolfi ranked the looks presented by Aiden Zhane, Dahlia Sin, Jan, Jaida Essence Hall, and Rock M. Sakura numbers 58, 55, 39, 29, and 8, respectively, in Entertainment Weekly's list of the season's runway presentations. He said Aiden Zhane "[serves] Trinity The Tuck teas in a fun, colorful look that, like her fall and spring challenge attire, delightfully contrasts the grim, spooky aesthetic many expected to see from this ghoulish gal". Nolfi said Jan's "offbeat" look "proves that this ... queen is packing far more heat in her tulle-belt than her mild-mannered demeanors suggests" and Jaida Essence Hall's "delectable gown and elegant paint established her as a sophisticated force on the runway". He wrote about Rock M. Sakura: "Few queens could pull off a look as garish as this, but even tucked among 900 yards of tulle, Rock M. Sakura's mammoth personality bursts through this puffy ensemble's seams. It's not the most fashionable look on this list, but it's high camp, high energy, and the magic of drag to the highest power."
