= Alone Together (RuPaul's Drag Race) =

Episode of RuPaul's Drag Race

- RuPaul's Drag Race episode
- Episode no.: Season 12; Episode 13
- Presented by: RuPaul
- Original air date: May 22, 2020

Episode chronology
← Previous "Viva Drag Vegas"	Next → "Grand Finale"

"Alone Together" (sometimes "Reunited: Alone Together") is the thirteen episode of the twelfth season of the American television series RuPaul's Drag Race. It originally aired on May 22, 2020. The episode has contestants reunite virtually during the COVID-19 pandemic to discuss the season. Lisa Rinna and Harry Hamlin make guest appearances in a video clip to contestant Jackie Cox. Former contestant Vanessa Vanjie Mateo also makes a guest appearance.

== Episode ==
The episode starts with the season's contestants performing virtually to the song "The Shady Bunch", reminiscent of the opening of The Brady Bunch. RuPaul shares a video montage of season highlights, then introduces the contestants virtually for a "slumber party" while in quarantine because of the COVID-19 pandemic. Heidi N Closet talks about her personality and her discussions with guest judge Nicki Minaj and fellow contestant Gigi Goode. Gigi Goode and Heidi N Closet both apologize. Referencing the many alternative names suggested by RuPaul throughout the season, Heidi N Closet shares with RuPaul that she will be keeping her name.

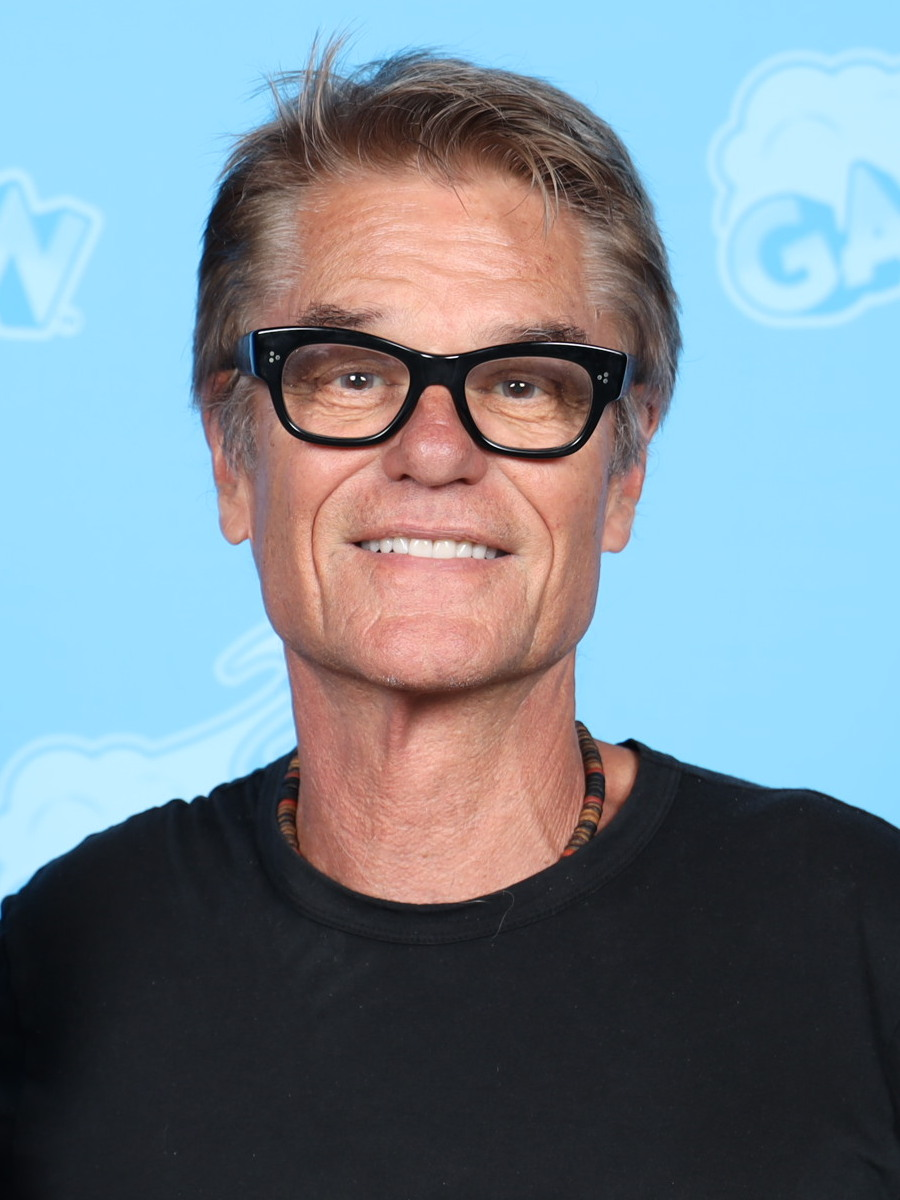
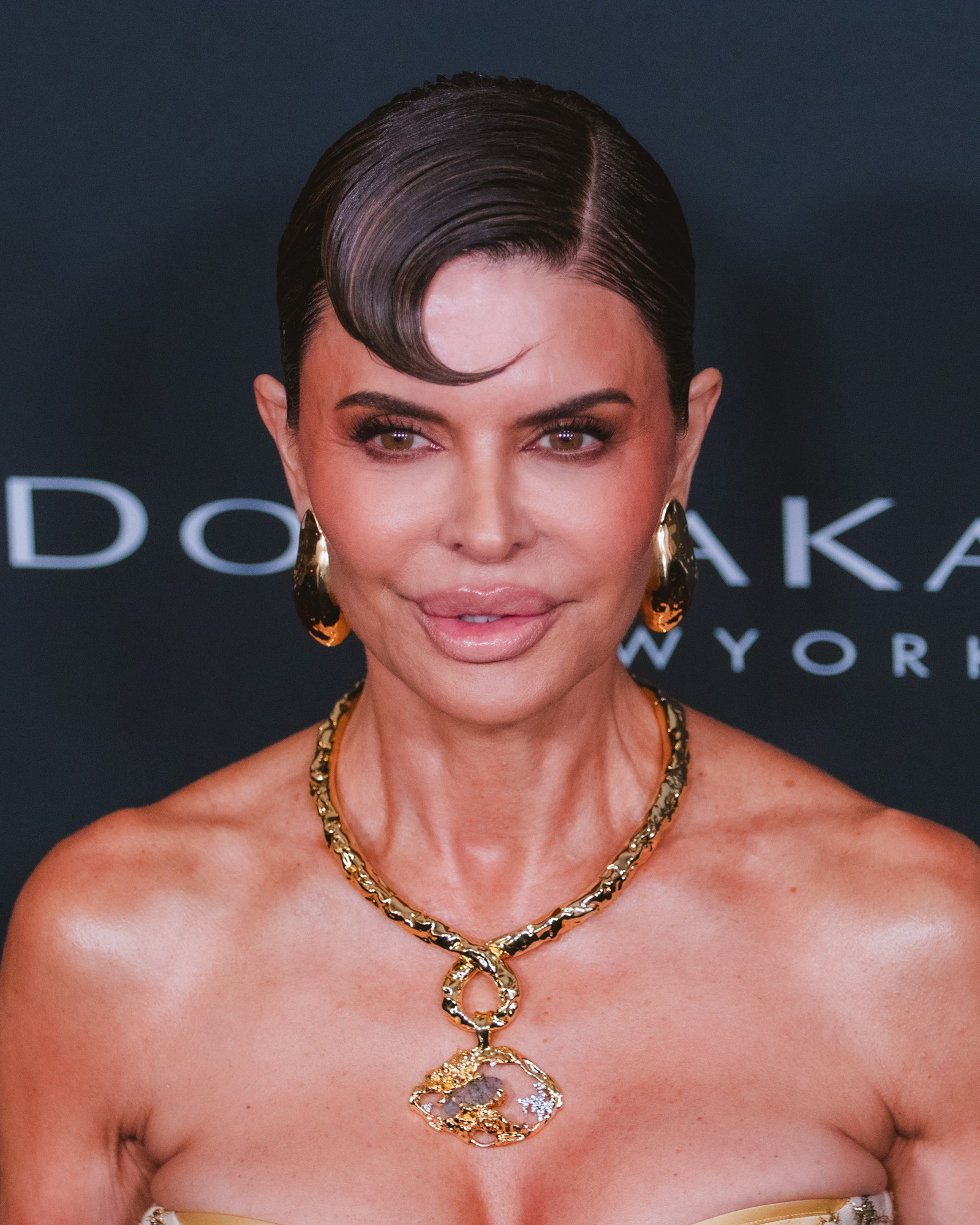
Spouses Harry Hamlin (left, pictured in 2023) and Lisa Rinna (right, pictured in 2026) make guest appearances.

The group discuss Nicky Doll's time on the season, including the episode in which the contestants said she should be the eliminated from the competition. The group also discuss Jackie Cox's personality, then RuPaul shares a video of Lisa Rinna and Harry Hamlin complimenting Jackie Cox. RuPaul shares a video clip of Aiden Zhane, then asks about her drag style and personality. The group also discuss Aiden Zhane's nap on one episode, as well as her conflict with Brita. Brita apologizes for her behavior, blaming the pressure of the competition. Jan and Jackie Cox talk about their relationships with Brita. RuPaul asks the contestants to stand to reveal whether or not they are fully dressed in drag.

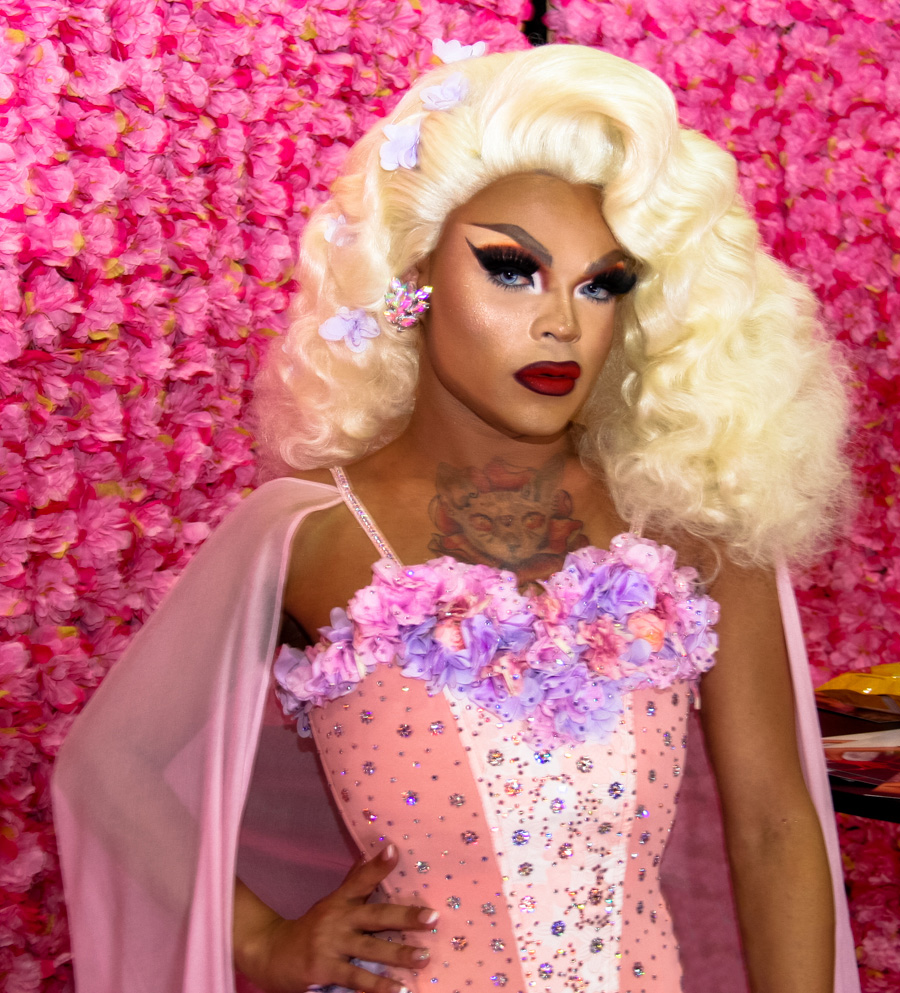
Vanessa Vanjie Mateo (pictured at RuPaul's DragCon LA in 2018) makes a guest appearance.

RuPaul talks to Rock M. Sakura and Dahlia Sin about their eliminations, including the latter's dismissive exit from the main stage. Rock M. Sakura talks about the impact of being on the show as well as her improved relationship with her mother. RuPaul talks to Widow Von'Du about her time on the show. Jan talks about why she got upset when Brita was sent home and after not winning the Rusical episode. The segment closes with a video clip of Jan impersonating Kris Jenner.

RuPaul asks the contestants to "toot" (approve) or "boot" (disapprove) some of the season's runway presentations. RuPaul then announces that "the library is open" and invites the contestants to "read" (playfully insult) each other. Clips are shown of former contestant Vanessa Vanjie Mateo asking the contestants questions on behalf of fans. RuPaul asks Crystal Methyd and Gigi Goode about their relationship. RuPaul asks some of the contestants about their families, then reads a note written by Jackie Cox's mother. A video montage features unseen footage of the season's guest judges. RuPaul asks the finalists to share what the season has meant to them, then the eliminated contestants who they think should win the competition. RuPaul encourages viewers to vote for their favorites online, then the episode closes with "American".

== Production and broadcast ==
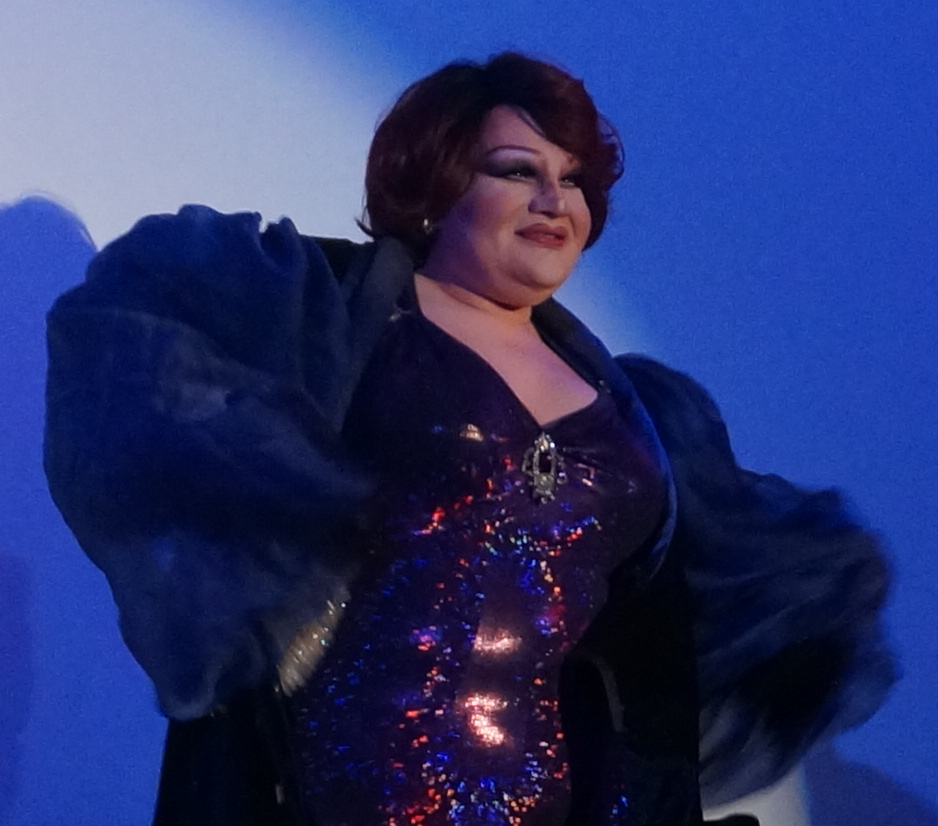
Former contestant Victoria "Porkchop" Parker (pictured in 2017) makes a guest appearance in the episode's opening sequence.

The episode originally aired on May 22, 2020. It was shot virtually, with contestants filming from their homes, with the exception of Sherry Pie, who was not invited to participate in the reunion of finale. The introduction ("The Shady Bunch") features a guest appearance by Victoria "Porkchop" Parker, who competed on the show's first season, portraying a character reminiscent of Alice Nelson from The Brady Bunch.

=== Fashion ===
RuPaul wears a purple hoodie and a blue face mask. Aiden Zhane has a pink outfit and a large dark wig. Brita has a pink dress and a large blonde wig. Crystal Methyd resembles Ebenezer Scrooge and carries a candle on a candlestick. Dahlia Sin's wig is shaped like two spikes. Gigi Goode wears a blue-and-white dress and a red wig. Heidi N Closet has large earrings and a large bow on her head. Jackie Cox has a red dress, a dark wig, and a red headband. Jaida Essence Hall is in nightwear and has a blonde wig. Jan has hair rollers, a small pink hat, and a robe with a pattern featuring her face. Nicky Doll wears a gold dress and a short blonde wig. Rock M. Sakura has a white outfit and a matching wig. Widow Von'Du also has hair rollers.

== Reception ==
Kate Kulzick of The A.V. Club gave the episode a rating of 'B'. Paul McCallion of Vulture rated the episode four out of five stars.

== See also ==
- Impact of the COVID-19 pandemic on television
  - Impact of the COVID-19 pandemic on television in the United States
- Impact of the COVID-19 pandemic on the LGBTQ community
