= World's Worst (RuPaul's Drag Race) =

- RuPaul's Drag Race episode
- Episode no.: Season 12; Episode 3
- Presented by: RuPaul
- Original air date: March 13, 2020

Guest appearances
- Olivia Munn (guest judge); Charo

Episode chronology
| ← Previous "You Don't Know Me" | Next → "The Ball Ball" |

"World's Worst" is the third episode of the twelfth season of the American television series RuPaul's Drag Race. It originally aired on March 13, 2020. The episode's main challenge tasks the contestants with improvising in a parody talent show. American actress Olivia Munn is a guest judge. Spanish actress and singer Charo also makes a guest appearance.

Sherry Pie wins the main challenge. Dahlia Sin is eliminated from the competition after placing in the bottom and losing a lip-sync contest against Nicky Doll to "Problem" by Ariana Grande featuring Iggy Azalea.

== Episode ==
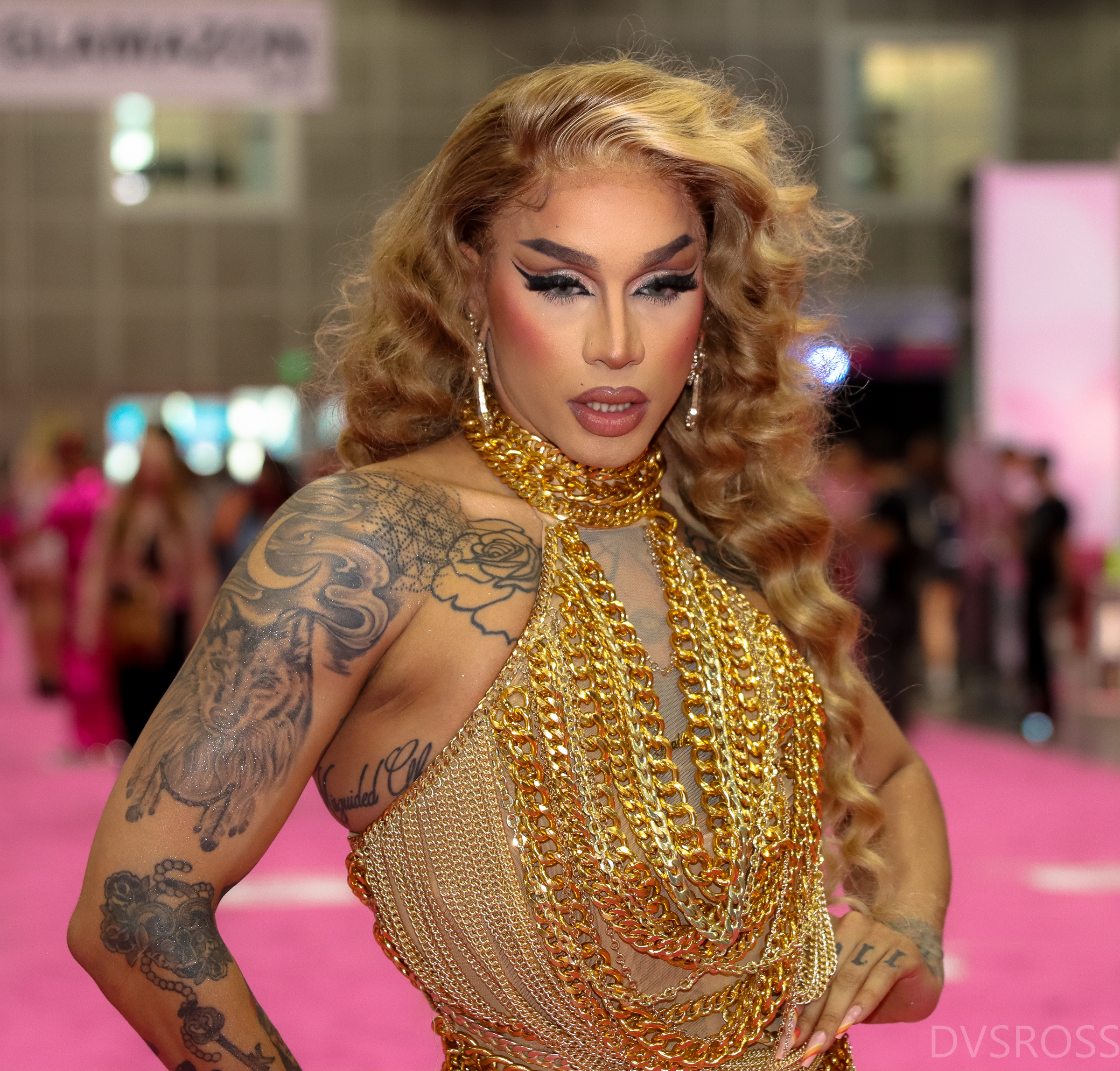
Dahlia Sin (pictured at RuPaul's DragCon LA in 2023) is eliminated from the competition.

The two groups of contestants meet in the Werk Room. On a new day, RuPaul greets the merged group and asks Jaida Essence Hall and Widow Von'Du, as the winners of the first episodes, to rank their fellow contestants from strongest to weakest. RuPaul then says Aiden Zhane and Heidi N Closet, who were ranked the weakest, are team captains, along with Jaida Essence Hall and Widow Von'Du. RuPaul then reveals the main challenge, which tasks the contestants with teaming up and improvising in the parody talent show called "World's Worst". Following are the four teams:

- Team 3 Girls, 1 Brain: Aiden Zhane, Brita, and Sherry Pie
- Team Fruity Patooties: Dahlia Sin, Jaida Essence Hall, Jan, and Rock M. Sakura
- Team Squirrel Scouts: Crystal Methyd, Nicky Doll, and Widow Von'Du
- Team The Del Rio Triplets: Gigi Goode, Heidi N Closet, and Jackie Cox

The teams start to rehearse. RuPaul returns to the Werk Room to meet with each group, asking questions and offering advice. The talent competition commences, with Carson Kressley as the host of "World's Worst" and Charo, Ornacia, and Ross Mathews (as Bossy Rossy) as judges of the talent show.

On elimination day, the contestants make final preparations for the fashion show. Dahlia Sin talks about her coming out experience, as well as her twin's subsequent coming out. On the main stage, RuPaul welcomes fellow judges Michelle Visage, Mathews, and Kressley, as well as guest judge Olivia Munn. RuPaul shares the assignment and runway category ("Buttons and Bows"), then the fashion show commences. The judges deliver their critiques, deliberate, and share the results with the group. Heidi N Closet, Jackie Cox, and Sherry Pie receive positive critiques, and Sherry Pie wins the challenge. Crystal Methyd, Dahlia Sin, and Nicky Doll receive negative critiques, and Crystal Methyd is deemed safe. Dahlia Sin and Nicky Doll face off in a lip-sync contest to "Problem" (2014) by Ariana Grande featuring Iggy Azalea. Nicky Doll wins the lip-sync and Dahlia Sin is eliminated from the competition.

== Production and broadcast ==
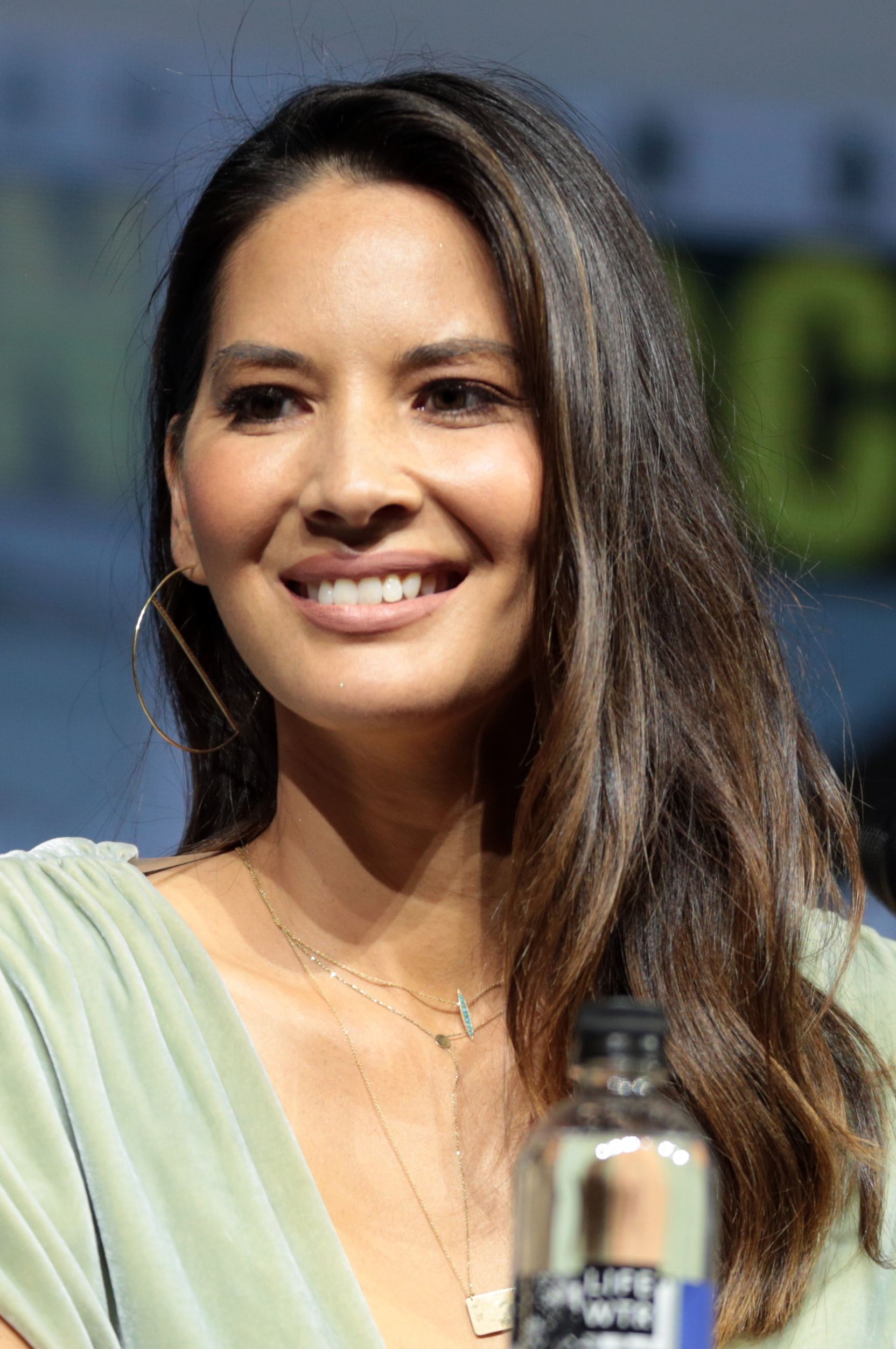
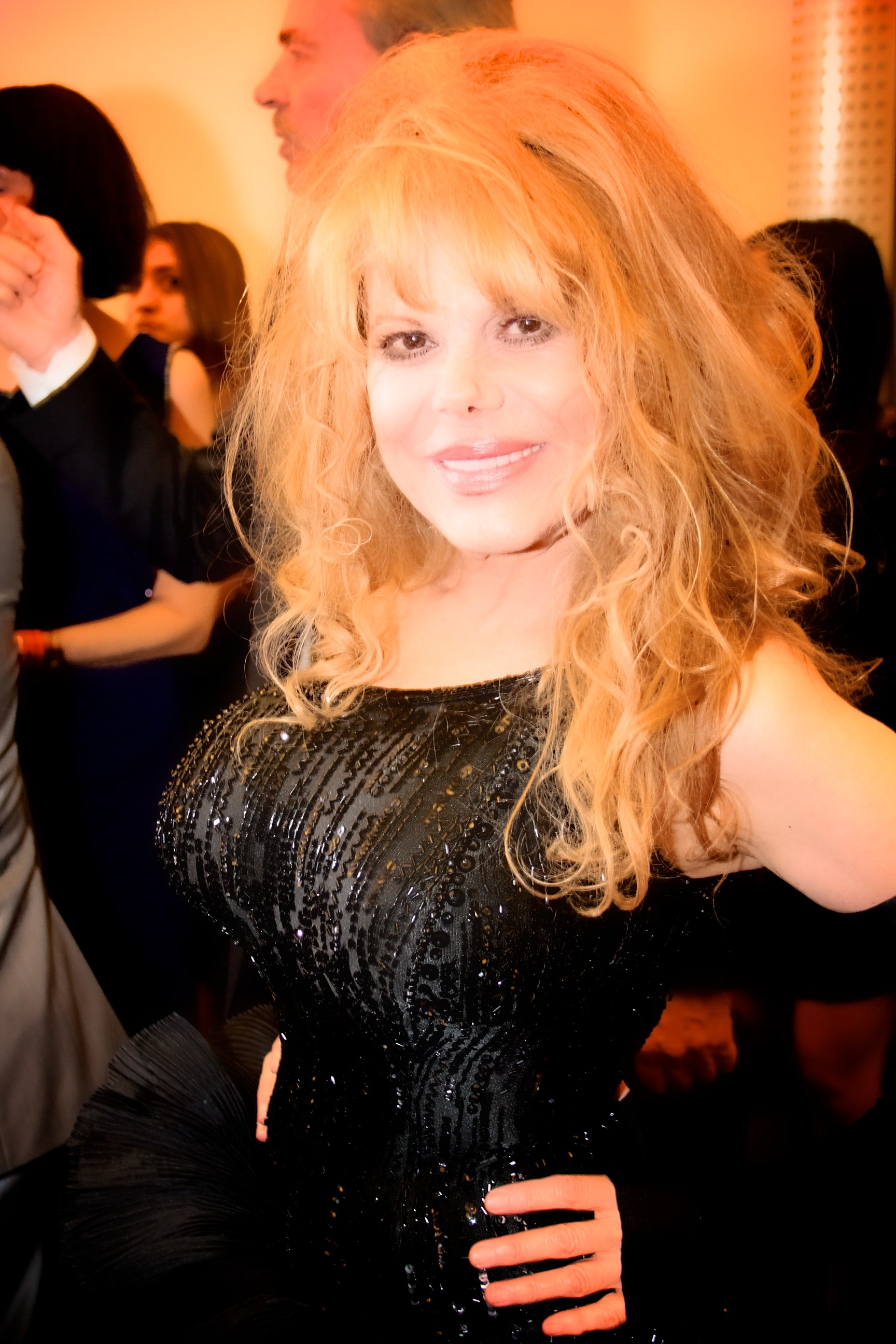
Olivia Munn (left) is a guest judge and Charo (right, pictured in 2013) also makes a guest appearance.

The episode originally aired on March 13, 2020. For the talent competition, one of the groups wears girl scout uniforms and another dress as fruits and a vegetable (an apple, broccoli, a bundle of grapes, and an orange).

When exiting the stage, Dahlia Sin does not acknowledge the judges or other contestants out of frustration.

=== Fashion ===
For the fashion show, the contestants present looks incorporating bows and buttons. Jaida Essence Hall has a Barbie-inspired pink outfit and a large blonde wig. Dahlia Sin has a blue-and-pink outfit with a headpiece. Rock M. Sakura's look resembles Alice from Alice in Wonderland. She has a long blonde wig with bows. Jan resembles a voodoo doll. Heidi N Closet has a Pinocchio-inspired look and she wears a long prosthetic nose. Gigi Goode's outfit is made of thousands of orange buttons. She has an orange wig and carries a matching handbag. Jackie Cox's dress is yellow and purple. Widow Von'Du's look is inspired by clowns. Crystal Methyd's outfit is pink and red. Nicky Doll's look is inspired by Cinderella. Aiden Zhane has a short pink dress with bows of various colors. She wears a short brown wig. Brita's dress is pink and she wears a blonde wig. Sherry Pie carries a matching doll.

== Reception ==
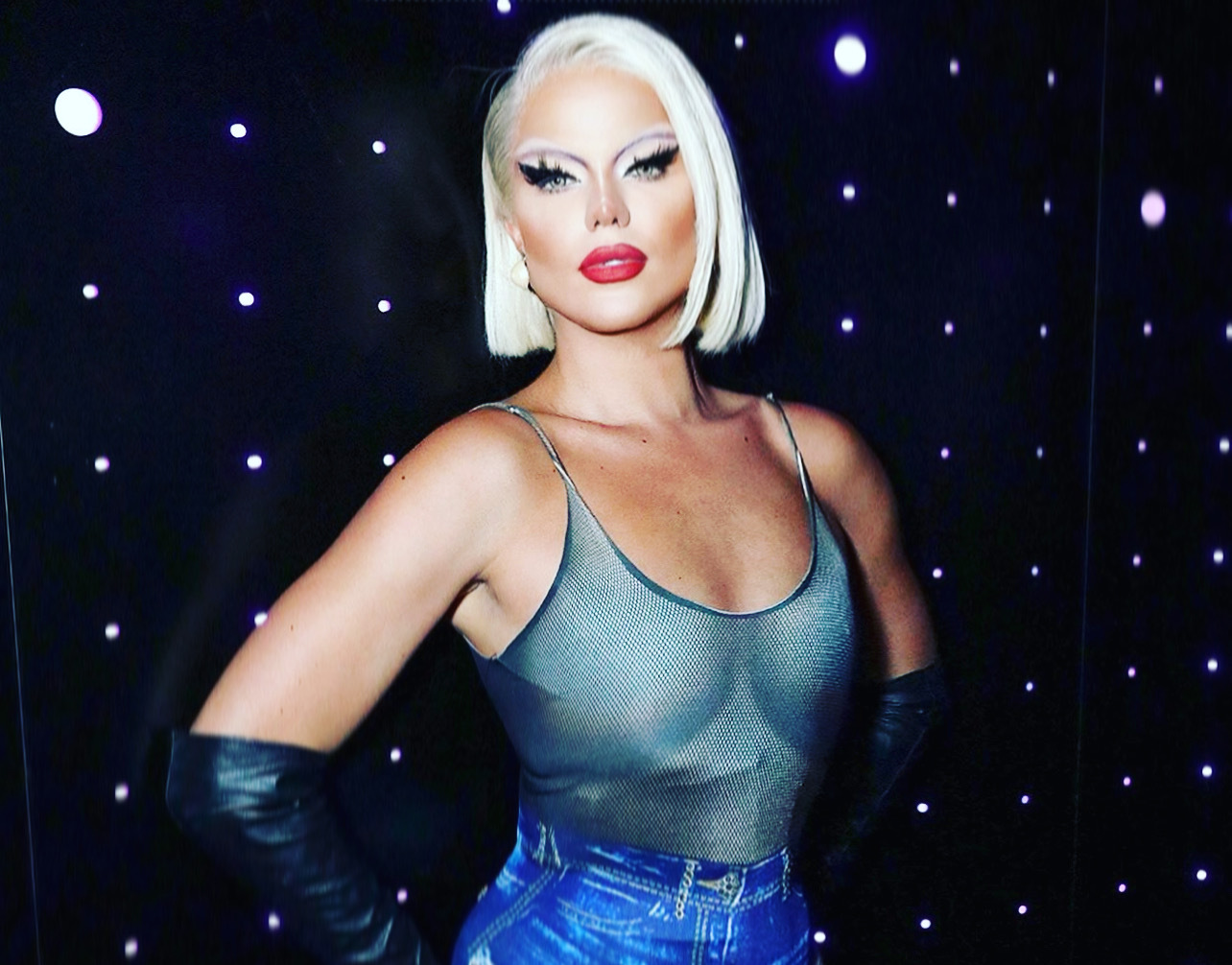
Nicky Doll (pictured in 2022) wins the episode's lip-sync contest.

Kate Kulzick of The A.V. Club gave the episode a rating of 'B'. Paul McCallion of Vulture rated the episode three out of five stars. Amaya Lynch included "World's Worst" in Screen Rant's 2022 list of the show's ten worst episodes, according to IMDb.

Stephen Daw ranked the "Problem" performance seventh in Billboard's 2021 list of the show's lip-sync contests to songs by Grande to date. Daw opined, "Notoriously, the first elimination of [the season] came after a relatively lackluster lip sync. Both Dahlia Sin and Nicky Doll ended up sort of sauntering around the stage, landing in a series of poses that, while beautiful to look at, did not provide the entertainment fans have come to expect in a lip sync." He continued, "Ultimately, Nicky was able to save herself from elimination in this lip sync, even though it felt like a photo-finish for last place. Tricks and stunts aren't necessary for making a great lip sync — but this one needed something, especially with such an infectious, lip sync-ready song like 'Problem' playing in the background."
