= The Ball Ball =

- RuPaul's Drag Race episode
- Episode no.: Season 12; Episode 4
- Presented by: RuPaul
- Original air date: March 20, 2020

Guest appearance
- Leslie Jones

Episode chronology
← Previous "World's Worst"	Next → "Gay's Anatomy"

"The Ball Ball" is the fourth episode of the twelfth season of the American television series RuPaul's Drag Race. It originally aired on March 20, 2020. The episode's main challenge tasks the contestants with presenting three looks in a fashion show. Leslie Jones is a guest judge.

Gigi Goode wins the main challenge. Rock M. Sakura is eliminated from the competition after placing in the bottom and losing a lip-sync contest against Brita to "S&M" by Rihanna. The corresponding episode of RuPaul's Drag Race: Untucked earned a nomination in the Outstanding Picture Editing for an Unstructured Reality Program category at the 72nd Primetime Creative Arts Emmy Awards.

== Episode ==
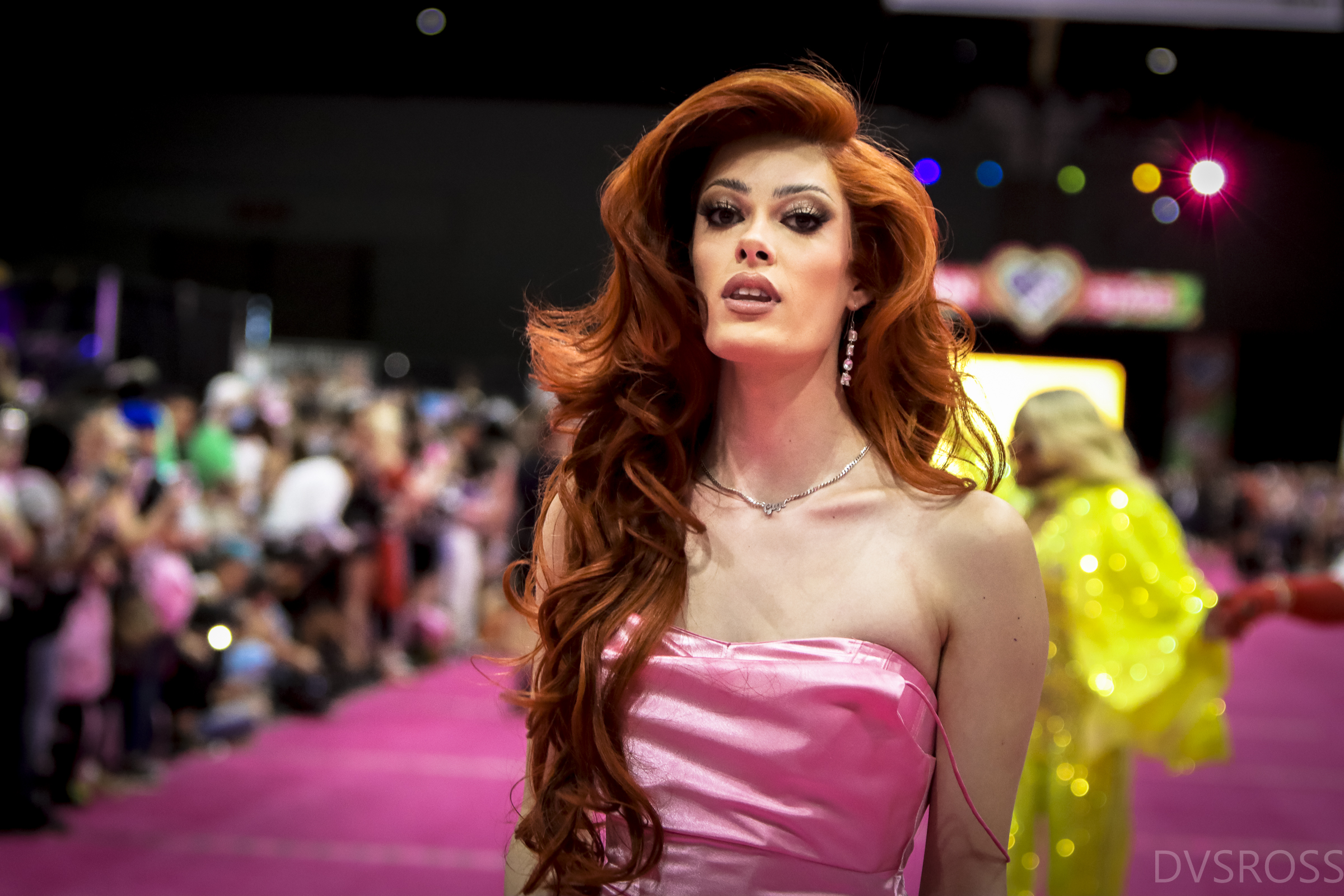
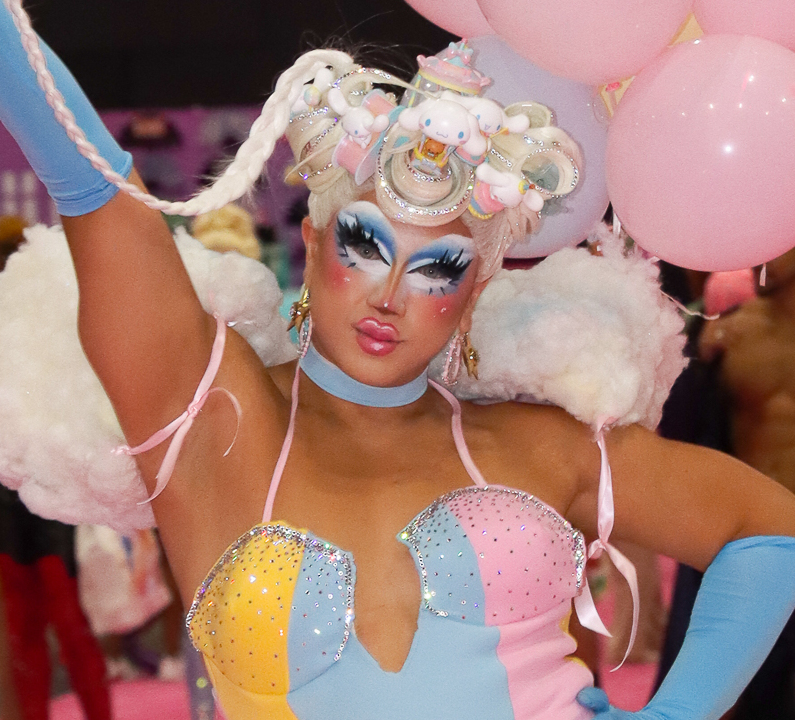
Gigi Goode (top, pictured at RuPaul's DragCon LA in 2022) wins the episode's main challenge; Rock M. Sakura (bottom, pictured at the same event in 2024) is eliminated from the competition.

For the episode's mini-challenge, the contestants compete in "The Beehive Jive" dance competition. Gigi Goode wins the mini-challenge.

For the main challenge, the contestants are tasked with presenting three looks for the Ball Ball. The runway categories are "Lady Baller", "Basketball Wife Realness", and "Balls to the Wall Eleganza". The first two categories are sports-related and the third category requires the contestants to create original outfits from ball-shaped materials.

On the main stage, RuPaul welcomes fellow judges as well as guest judge Leslie Jones. Gigi Goode, Jaida Essence Hall, and Nicky Doll receive positive critiques, and Gigi Goode wins the challenge. Aiden Zhane, Brita, and Rock M. Sakura receive negative critiques, and Aiden Zhane is deemed safe. Brita and Rock M. Sakura place in the bottom and face off in a lip-sync contest to "S&M" (2011) by Rihanna. Brita is declared the winner of the lip-sync and Rock M. Sakura is eliminated from the competition.

== Production and broadcast ==
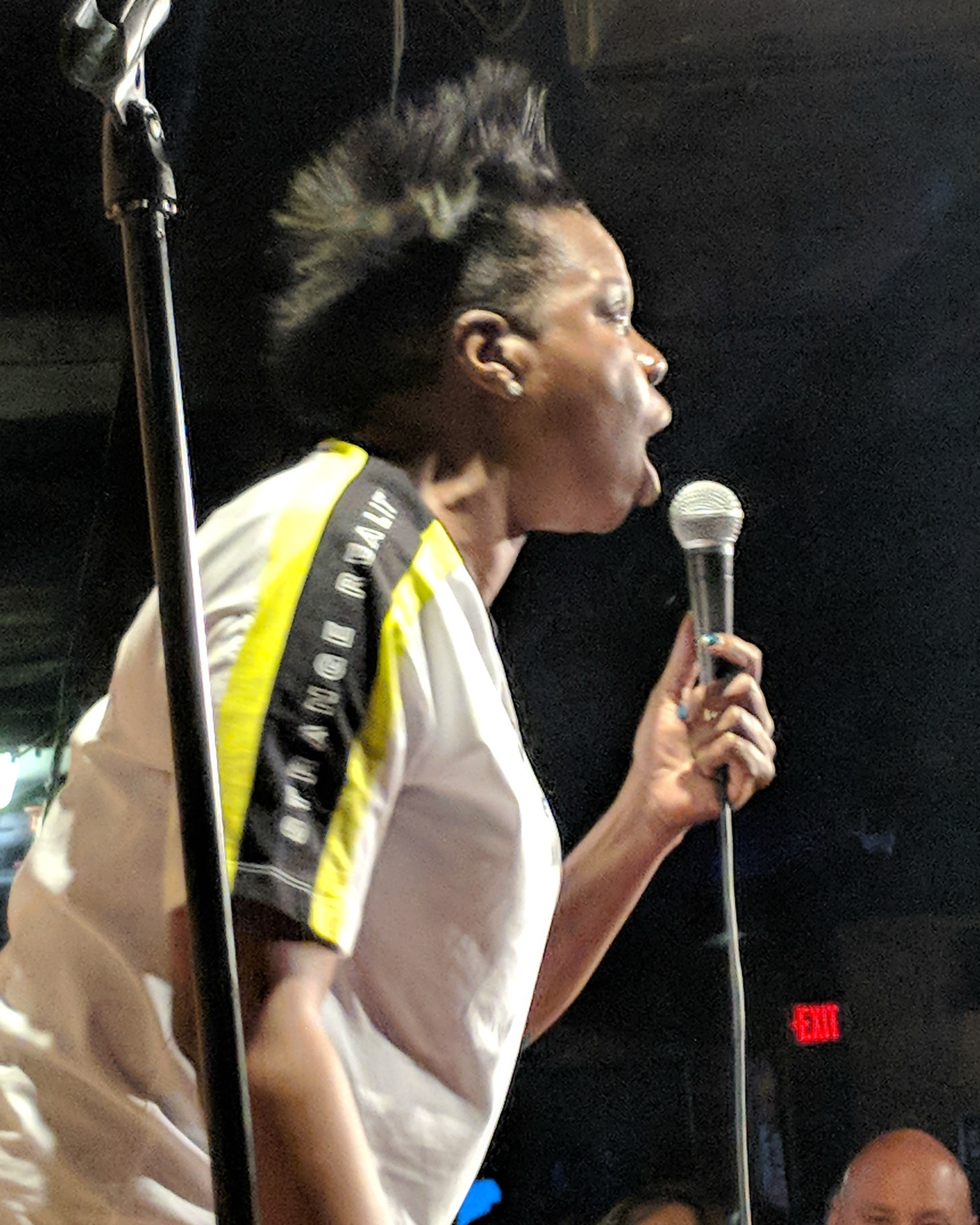
American comedian and actress Leslie Jones is a guest judge.

The episode originally aired on March 20, 2020.

Michael Cuby of Nylon said of the lip-sync contest: "after spending a large chunk of the song struggling to rip the bottom off of her very restricting gown, Rock lost her edge and, ultimately, was sent packing, struggling to hold back her tears as she was dismissed.

=== Fashion ===
Joey Nolfi of Entertainment Weekly described one of Rock M. Sakura's looks as a "genius tetherball-inspired wig that literally swung around her head on a chain".

== Reception ==
Kate Kulzick of The A.V. Club gave the episode a rating of 'B'. Sam Damshenas of Gay Times said of the lip-sync contest: "It was one of the most controversial eliminations in Drag Race HERstory, and in our opinion, the least well-deserved since Naomi Smalls shockingly chopped All Stars 4 frontrunner Manila Luzon (we're still not over it)." Stephen Daw of Billboard described the contest as "ferocious". Anja Grčar of Screen Rant wrote: "Post-episode discussions revealed that fans thought that Aiden would have gone home, but the judges eliminated Rock M. Sakura instead." Joey Guerra of the Houston Chronicle said Rock M. Sakura "created an instantly iconic runway moment ... when she swung a ball over her wig".

The corresponding episode of RuPaul's Drag Race: Untucked earned lead editor Kendra Pasker, as well as editors Yali Sharon and Kate Smith, a nomination in the Outstanding Picture Editing for an Unstructured Reality Program category at the 72nd Primetime Creative Arts Emmy Awards.
