= RuPaul's Drag Race season 12 =

2020 season of RuPaul's Drag Race

RuPaul's Drag Race
- Season 12
- Promotional poster for season twelve
- Hosted by: RuPaul
- Judges: RuPaul; Michelle Visage; Carson Kressley; Ross Mathews
- No. of contestants: 13
- Winner: Jaida Essence Hall
- Runners-up: Crystal Methyd; Gigi Goode
- Miss Congeniality: Heidi N Closet
- Companion show: RuPaul's Drag Race: Untucked!
- No. of episodes: 14

Release
- Original network: VH1
- Original release: February 28 – May 29, 2020

Season chronology
- ← Previous; Season 11 Next → Season 13

The twelfth season of RuPaul's Drag Race premiered on February 28 and concluded on May 29, 2020. The competition was broadcast on VH1 in the United States and saw 13 new queens competing for the title of "America's Next Drag Superstar". VH1 renewed both RuPaul's Drag Race and its spin-off RuPaul's Drag Race All Stars for a twelfth and fifth season respectively on August 19, 2019. At the time of the renewal the Drag Race franchise had earned VH1 a total of 14 Emmy nominations. Casting calls were opened in January 2019 while the cast was revealed by season 11 winner Yvie Oddly on January 23, 2020.

Following multiple revelations of misconduct, Sherry Pie was disqualified from the show and mostly edited out of the American broadcast, although initial overseas screenings retained the original edit.

Due to the ongoing COVID-19 pandemic, the reunion and finale were held virtually across the country.

The winner of the twelfth season of RuPaul's Drag Race was Jaida Essence Hall, with Crystal Methyd and Gigi Goode being the runners-up, and Heidi N Closet being Miss Congeniality.

The Halloween variety show Bring Back My Ghouls, hosted by Jaida Essence Hall and featuring season 12 contestants, was broadcast on WOWPresents on October 30, 2020.

== Contestants ==
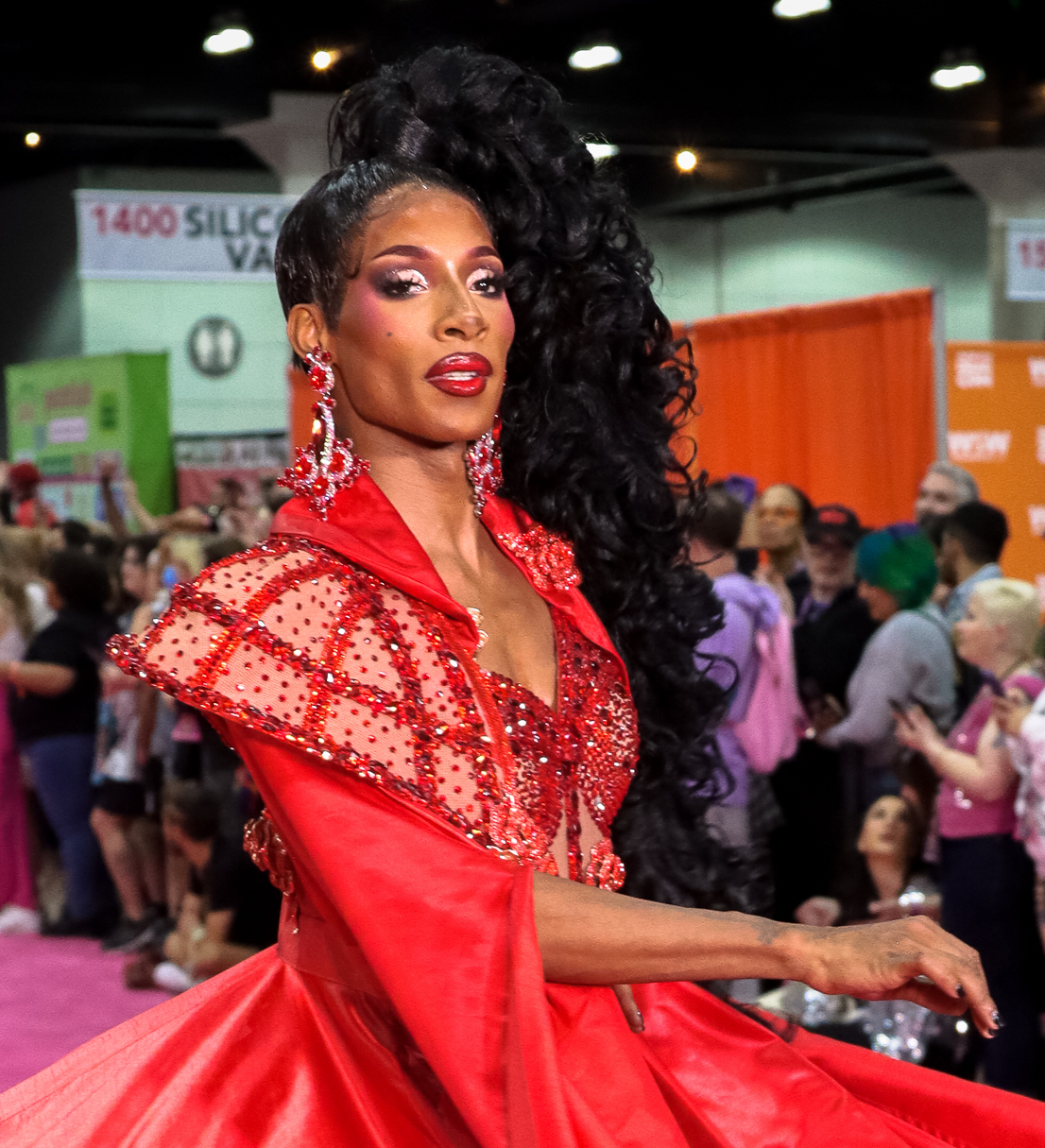
The winner, Jaida Essence Hall

Ages, names, and cities stated are at time of filming.

Contestants of RuPaul's Drag Race season 12 and their backgrounds
Contestant	Age	Hometown	Outcome
Jaida Essence Hall	32	Milwaukee, Wisconsin	Winner
Crystal Methyd	28	Springfield, Missouri	Runners-up
Gigi Goode	21	Los Angeles, California	Runners-up
Sherry Pie	27	New York City, New York	Disqualified (Note: Sherry Pie was disqualified from the competition prior to the premiere due to her sexually harassing men online)
Jackie Cox	34	New York City, New York	5th place
Heidi N Closet	24	Ramseur, North Carolina	6th place (Note: Heidi N Closet was voted Miss Congeniality by fellow contestants.)
Widow Von'Du	30	Kansas City, Missouri	7th place
Jan (Note: Jan Sport is referred to as Jan on the show.)	26	New York City, New York	8th place
Brita (Note: Brita Filter is referred to as Brita on the show.)	34	New York City, New York	9th place
Aiden Zhane	29	Acworth, Georgia	10th place
Nicky Doll	28	New York City, New York	11th place
Rock M. Sakura	28	San Francisco, California	12th place
Dahlia Sin	28	Los Angeles, California	13th place

== Contestant progress ==
Legend:

Jaida Essence Hall won RuPaul's Drag Race season 12.
Crystal Methyd and Gigi Goode were the runners-up.
Heidi N Closet was voted Miss Congeniality (Miss C) by fellow contestants.
WIN indicates that the contestant won the challenge.
TOP2 indicates that the contestant was one of the two best performing in the challenge, but lost the lip sync to win it.
SAFE indicates that the contestant was declared safe by the judges.
BTM (Bottom) indicates that the contestant was up for elimination.
ELIM (Eliminated) indicates that the contestant was eliminated.
DISQ (Disqualified) indicates that the contestant was disqualified.
Guest indicates that the contestant returned as a guest.

Progress of contestants including placements in each episode
Contestant	Episode													
Contestant	1	2	3	4	5	6	7	8	9	10	11	12	13	14
Jaida Essence Hall		WIN	SAFE	SAFE	SAFE	SAFE	SAFE	SAFE	WIN	WIN	BTM	SAFE	Guest	Winner
Crystal Methyd	SAFE		SAFE	SAFE	SAFE	SAFE	SAFE	SAFE	SAFE	SAFE	WIN	BTM	Guest	Runner-up
Gigi Goode	TOP2		SAFE	WIN	SAFE	WIN	WIN	SAFE	SAFE	SAFE	SAFE	WIN	Guest	Runner-up
Sherry Pie		TOP2	WIN	SAFE	WIN	SAFE	SAFE	SAFE	SAFE	SAFE	SAFE	SAFE	DISQ	
Jackie Cox	SAFE		SAFE	SAFE	SAFE	SAFE	SAFE	SAFE	BTM	BTM	SAFE	ELIM	Guest	Guest
Heidi N Closet	SAFE		SAFE	SAFE	BTM	SAFE	BTM	WIN	SAFE	BTM	ELIM		Guest	Miss C
Widow Von'Du	WIN		SAFE	SAFE	SAFE	SAFE	SAFE	BTM	ELIM				Guest	Guest
Jan		SAFE	SAFE	SAFE	SAFE	SAFE	SAFE	ELIM					Guest	Guest
Brita	SAFE		SAFE	BTM	SAFE	BTM	ELIM						Guest	Guest
Aiden Zhane		SAFE	SAFE	SAFE	SAFE	ELIM							Guest	Guest
Nicky Doll	SAFE		BTM	SAFE	ELIM								Guest	Guest
Rock M. Sakura		SAFE	SAFE	ELIM									Guest	Guest
Dahlia Sin		SAFE	ELIM										Guest	Guest

== Lip syncs ==
Legend:

The contestant won the lip sync to win the challenge.
The contestant was eliminated after their first time in the bottom.
The contestant was eliminated after their second time in the bottom.
The contestant was eliminated after their third time in the bottom.
The contestant was eliminated after their fourth time in the bottom.
The contestant won the Lip Sync for the Crown and was declared the winner of the season.

Episode	Contestants			Song	Winner
1	Gigi Goode	vs.	Widow Von'Du	"Starships" (Nicki Minaj)	Widow Von'Du
2	Jaida Essence Hall	vs.	Sherry Pie	"Call Your Girlfriend" (Robyn)	Jaida Essence Hall
Episode	Contestants			Song	Eliminated
3	Dahlia Sin	vs.	Nicky Doll	"Problem" (Ariana Grande ft. Iggy Azalea)	Dahlia Sin
4	Brita	vs.	Rock M. Sakura	"S&M" (Rihanna)	Rock M. Sakura
5	Heidi N Closet	vs.	Nicky Doll	"Heart to Break" (Kim Petras)	Nicky Doll
6	Aiden Zhane	vs.	Brita	"Let It Go" (Caissie Levy)	Aiden Zhane
7	Brita	vs.	Heidi N Closet	"Burning Up" (Madonna)	Brita
8	Jan	vs.	Widow Von'Du	"This Is My Night" (Chaka Khan)	Jan
9	Jackie Cox	vs.	Widow Von'Du	"Firework" (Katy Perry)	Widow Von'Du
10	Heidi N Closet	vs.	Jackie Cox	"Kill the Lights" (Alex Newell, DJ Cassidy, Nile Rodgers)	None
11	Heidi N Closet	vs.	Jaida Essence Hall	"1999" (Prince)	Heidi N Closet
12	Crystal Methyd	vs.	Jackie Cox	"On the Floor" (Jennifer Lopez ft. Pitbull)	Jackie Cox
Episode	Contestants			Song	
14	Crystal Methyd vs. Gigi Goode vs. Jaida Essence Hall			"Bring Back My Girls" (RuPaul)	
14	Crystal Methyd			"I'm Like a Bird" (Nelly Furtado)	
14	Gigi Goode			"Take On Me" (A-ha)	
14	Jaida Essence Hall			"Get Up" (Ciara ft. Chamillionaire)	
14	Final contestants			Song	Winner
14	Crystal Methyd vs. Gigi Goode vs. Jaida Essence Hall			"Survivor" (Destiny's Child)	Jaida Essence Hall

== Guest judges ==
Listed in chronological order:

- Nicki Minaj, rapper
- Robyn, singer
- Thandiwe Newton, actress
- Olivia Munn, actress
- Leslie Jones, comedian and actress
- Normani, singer
- Daniel Franzese, actor
- Jonathan Bennett, actor and television host
- Alexandria Ocasio-Cortez, congresswoman
- Winnie Harlow, model
- Chaka Khan, singer
- Jeff Goldblum, actor
- Rachel Bloom, actress
- Daisy Ridley, actress
- Whoopi Goldberg, actress and television personality
- Jamal Sims, choreographer

=== Special guests ===
Guests who appeared in episodes, but did not judge on the main stage.

Episode 1

- Kimora Blac, contestant on season 9 (impersonating Kim Kardashian)
- Mayhem Miller, contestant on season 10 (impersonating Kanye West)
- Raven, runner-up of season 2 and of All Stars Season 1
- The Vivienne, winner of RuPaul's Drag Race UK series 1 (impersonating Donald Trump)

Episode 2

- Kim Chi, runner up of season 8 (impersonating Anna Sui)
- Mayhem Miller, contestant on season 10 (impersonating Andre Leon Talley)
- Raven, runner-up of season 2 and of All Stars season 1
- Sonique, contestant on season 2 (impersonating Karl Lagerfeld)
- Zaldy, fashion designer

Episode 3

- Charo, actress, singer, classical guitarist, comedian
- Vivacious, contestant on season 6

Episode 6

- Vanessa Vanjie Mateo, contestant on season 10 and season 11

Episode 7

- David Benjamin Steinberg, record producer
- Erik Paparozzi, record producer
- Jamal Sims, choreographer

Episode 8

- Bob Harper, personal trainer and author

Episode 9

- Raven, runner-up of season 2 and of All Stars season 1

Episode 13

- Victoria "Porkchop" Parker, contestant on season 1
- Vanessa Vanjie Mateo, contestant on season 10 and season 11
- Lisa Rinna, reality television personality
- Harry Hamlin, actor

Episode 14

- Rachel Bloom, actress and comedian
- Bob the Drag Queen, winner of season 8
- Monét X Change, contestant on season 10 and winner of All Stars season 4
- Adore Delano, contestant on season 6 and All Stars season 2
- Bianca Del Rio, winner of season 6
- Scarlet Envy, contestant on season 11
- Daniel Franzese, actor
- Whoopi Goldberg, actress and comedian
- Adam Lambert, singer
- Vanessa Vanjie Mateo, contestant on seasons 10 and 11
- Dolly Parton, singer
- Peppermint, runner-up of season 9
- Kim Petras, singer
- Robyn, singer
- Latrice Royale, contestant on season 4 and All Stars seasons 1 and 4
- Yvie Oddly, winner of season 11
- Sasha Velour, winner of season 9
- Vivacious, contestant on season 6
- Nina West, contestant on season 11

== Episodes ==
No. overall	No. in season	Title	Original release date
146	1	"I'm That Bitch"	February 28, 2020
Seven new queens enter the workroom. RuPaul then announces that this season will be a split premiere. For the first mini-challenge, the queens will walk the runway showing off two looks: one from their spring collection and one from their fall collection. For the main challenge, the queens will write, record, and perform verses to "I'm That Bitch". On the runway, category is Sparkles. Brita, Gigi Goode, Jackie Cox and Widow Von'Du receive positive critiques. Heidi N Closet and Nicky Doll receive negative critiques. It is then announced that Gigi Goode and Widow Von'Du are the top two queens of the week and will lip-sync for the win. They lip-sync to "Starships" by Nicki Minaj. After the lip-sync, Widow Von'Du is announced as the winner of the challenge. RuPaul then reveals that no one will be going home.: Guest Judge: Nicki Minaj; Alternating Judge: Carson Kressley; Mini–Challenge: Walk the runway showing off two looks: one from their spring collection and one from their fall collection; Main Challenge: Write, record, and perform verses to "I'm That Bitch"; Runway Theme: Sparkles; Top Two: Gigi Goode and Widow Von'Du; Lip-Sync Song: "Starships" by Nicki Minaj; Challenge Winner: Widow Von'Du; Lip-Sync Prize: A $5,000 cash tip; Eliminated: None
147	2	"You Don't Know Me"	March 6, 2020
The remaining six queens enter the workroom. For this week's mini-challenge, the queens will walk the runway showing off two looks: one from their spring collection and one from their fall collection. For the main challenge, the queens will write, record, and perform verses to "You Don't Know Me". On the runway, category is Tulle. Aiden Zhane, Jaida Essence Hall, Jan and Sherry Pie receive positive critiques. Dahlia Sin and Rock M. Sakura receive negative critiques. It is then announced that Jaida Essence Hall and Sherry Pie are the top two queens of the week and will lip-sync for the win. They lip-sync to "Call Your Girlfriend" by Robyn. After the lip-sync, Jaida Essence Hall is announced as the winner of the challenge. RuPaul then reveals that no one will be going home.: Guest Judges: Robyn and Thandie Newton; Alternating Judge: Ross Mathews; Mini–Challenge: Walk the runway showing off two looks: one from their spring collection and one from their fall collection; Main Challenge: Write, record, and perform verses to "You Don't Know Me"; Runway Theme: Tulle; Top Two: Jaida Essence Hall and Sherry Pie; Lip-Sync Song: "Call Your Girlfriend" by Robyn; Challenge Winner: Jaida Essence Hall; Lip-Sync Prize: A $5,000 cash tip; Eliminated: None
148	3	"World's Worst"	March 13, 2020
For this week's main challenge, the queens will team up and improvise in the talent competition "World's Worst".: Team 3 Girls, 1 Brain: Aiden Zhane, Brita and Sherry Pie; Team Fruity Patooties: Dahlia Sin, Jaida Essence Hall, Jan and Rock M. Sakura; Team Squirrel Scouts: Crystal Methyd, Nicky Doll and Widow Von'Du; Team The Del Rio Triplets: Gigi Goode, Heidi N Closet and Jackie Cox; On the runway, category is Buttons and Bows. Heidi N Closet, Jackie Cox and Sherry Pie receive positive critiques, with Sherry Pie winning the challenge. Crystal Methyd, Dahlia Sin and Nicky Doll receive negative critiques, with Crystal Methyd being safe. Dahlia Sin and Nicky Doll lip-sync to "Problem" by Ariana Grande ft. Iggy Azalea. Nicky Doll wins the lip-sync and Dahlia Sin is the first queen to sashay away.: Guest Judge: Olivia Munn; Alternating Judges: Ross Mathews and Carson Kressley; Main Challenge: In teams, improvise in the talent competition "World's Worst"; Runway Theme: Buttons and Bows; Challenge Winner: Sherry Pie; Challenge Prize: A $5,000 cash tip (VH1 and World of Wonder donated $5,000 to The Trevor Project as a result of Sherry Pie's disqualification from the competition.); Bottom Two: Dahlia Sin and Nicky Doll; Lip-Sync Song: "Problem" by Ariana Grande ft. Iggy Azalea; Eliminated: Dahlia Sin; Farewell Message: "Keep Ur Heads UP I♡U ALL! -Dahlia ♡"
149	4	"The Ball Ball"	March 20, 2020
For this week's mini-challenge, the queens will compete in "The Beehive Jive" dance competition. Gigi Goode wins the mini-challenge. For the main challenge, the queens will create three looks for The Ball Ball: Lady Baller, Basketball Wife Realness and Balls to the Wall Eleganza. On the runway, Gigi Goode, Jaida Essence Hall and Nicky Doll receive positive critiques, with Gigi Goode winning the challenge. Aiden Zhane, Brita and Rock M. Sakura receive negative critiques, with Aiden Zhane being safe. Brita and Rock M. Sakura lip-sync to "S&M" by Rihanna. Brita wins the lip-sync and Rock M. Sakura sashays away.: Guest Judge: Leslie Jones; Alternating Judge: Ross Mathews; Mini–Challenge: "The Beehive Jive" dance competition; Mini–Challenge Winner: Gigi Goode; Mini–Challenge Prize: A $2,500 cash tip; Main Challenge: The Ball Ball; Runway Themes: Lady Baller, Basketball Wife Realness and Balls to the Wall Eleganza; Challenge Winner: Gigi Goode; Challenge Prize: A $5,000 cash tip; Bottom Two: Brita and Rock M. Sakura; Lip-Sync Song: "S&M" by Rihanna; Eliminated: Rock M. Sakura; Farewell Message: "To all of my special queens, make sure you do what I couldn't do. Love yourself, respect yourself, and remember to show the world that you care about what you believe in. I‘m devastated I couldn‘t stay longer. But choose forward to looks of for memories with you. Rock M. Sakura ♡ Love you all truly ♡"
150	5	"Gay's Anatomy"	March 27, 2020
For this week's main challenge, the queens will overact in a parody of the popular TV show "Grey's Anatomy" called "Gay's Anatomy".: Aiden Zhane plays Henny; Brita plays Dr. Sandra Okurr; Crystal Methyd plays Fork Queen #2; Gigi Goode plays Dr. Tizzy Stevens; Heidi N Closet plays Fork Queen #1; Jackie Cox plays Dr. Meredith Gay #1; Jaida Essence Hall plays Rhonda Shimes; Jan plays Dr. Meredith Gay #2; Nicky Doll plays Baby Dearest; Sherry Pie plays Dr. Mother Gay; Widow Von'Du plays Mimi Dearest; On the runway, category is Planet of the Capes. Aiden Zhane, Gigi Goode, Jan, Jackie Cox, Sherry Pie and Widow Von'Du receive positive critiques, with Sherry Pie winning the challenge. Brita, Heidi N Closet and Nicky Doll receive negative critiques, with Brita being safe. Heidi N Closet and Nicky Doll lip-sync to "Heart to Break" by Kim Petras. Heidi N Closet wins the lip-sync and Nicky Doll sashays away.: Guest Judge: Normani; Alternating Judge: Carson Kressley; Main Challenge: Overact in a parody of the popular TV show "Grey's Anatomy" called "Gay's Anatomy"; Runway Theme: Planet of the Capes; Challenge Winner: Sherry Pie; Challenge Prize: A $5,000 cash tip (VH1 and World of Wonder donated $5,000 to The Trevor Project as a result of Sherry Pie's disqualification from the competition.); Bottom Two: Heidi N Closet and Nicky Doll; Lip-Sync Song: "Heart to Break" by Kim Petras; Eliminated: Nicky Doll; Farewell Message: "I may not have gotten a crown. But I have gotten a sisterhood. I♡U. Your French sister! (I'm still the prettier) 💋"
151	6	"Snatch Game"	April 3, 2020
For this week's main challenge, the queens will play the Snatch Game. Daniel Franzese and Jonathan Bennett star as the celebrity contestants. The cast consisted of: Aiden Zhane as Patricia Quinn; Brita as Jennifer Holliday; Crystal Methyd as Poppy; Gigi Goode as Maria the Robot; Heidi N Closet as Leslie Jones; Jackie Cox as Lisa Rinna; Jan as Bernadette Peters; Jaida Essence Hall as Cardi B; Sherry Pie as Katharine Hepburn; Widow Von'Du as Tina Turner and Ike Turner.; On the runway, category is Frozen Eleganza. Gigi Goode, Jackie Cox and Sherry Pie receive positive critiques, with Gigi Goode winning the challenge. Aiden Zhane, Brita and Crystal Methyd receive negative critiques, with Crystal Methyd being safe. Aiden Zhane and Brita lip-sync to "Let It Go" by Caissie Levy. Brita wins the lip-sync and Aiden Zhane sashays away.: Guest Judges: Daniel Franzese and Jonathan Bennett; Alternating Judge: Carson Kressley; Main Challenge: Snatch Game; Runway Theme: Frozen Eleganza; Challenge Winner: Gigi Goode; Challenge Prize: A $5,000 cash tip; Bottom Two: Aiden Zhane and Brita; Lip-Sync Song: "Let It Go" by Caissie Levy; Eliminated: Aiden Zhane; Farewell Message: "I hope my screams were loud enough for you Bitches. You may not know me now but you sure will later ♥︎ Aiden Zhane"
152	7	"Madonna: The Unauthorized Rusical"	April 10, 2020
For this week's main challenge, the queens will perform in Madonna: The Unauthorized Rusical.: Brita plays Cone Bra Madonna; Crystal Methyd plays Enlightened Madonna; Gigi Goode plays Unapologetic Madonna; Heidi N Closet plays Madonna Forever; Jaida Essence Hall plays Sexy Madonna; Jackie Cox plays Boy Toy Madonna; Jan plays Early Madonna; Sherry Pie plays Movie Star Madonna; Widow Von'Du plays Femmepire Madonna; On the runway, category is Night of a Thousand Michelle Visages. Crystal Methyd, Gigi Goode and Jan receive positive critiques, with Gigi Goode winning the challenge. Brita, Heidi N Closet and Jackie Cox receive negative critiques, with Jackie Cox being safe. Brita and Heidi N Closet lip-sync to "Burning Up" by Madonna. Heidi N Closet wins the lip-sync and Brita sashays away.: Guest Judges: Alexandria Ocasio-Cortez and Winnie Harlow; Alternating Judge: Carson Kressley; Main Challenge: Madonna: The Unauthorized Rusical; Runway Theme: Night of a Thousand Michelle Visages; Challenge Winner: Gigi Goode; Challenge Prize: A $5,000 cash tip; Bottom Two: Brita and Heidi N Closet; Lip-Sync Song: "Burning Up" by Madonna; Eliminated: Brita; Farewell Message: "SIS. SHARE THE JOY! YOU AIN'T SHIT. JK. LOVE YOU ALL. xo BRITA BITCH"
153	8	"Droop"	April 17, 2020
For this week's mini-challenge, the queens will pair up and create a box of FabFitFun products for another duo, then gift it to them with shade. Gigi Goode and Jackie Cox win the mini-challenge. For the main challenge, the queens will create and market products for the new drag queen lifestyle brand "Droop".: Crystal Methyd - The Magic Mullet, a collection of mullets; Gigi Goode - Goode Night Bitch, a fragrance and sleeping aid; Heidi N Closet - Heidi's Hydrates Multipurpose Lotion, a hydrating lotion; Jackie Cox - Jackie's Magic Carpet Merkins, a collection of merkins; Jaida Essence Hall - Luxuratuck, diamond-encrusted panties; Jan - Sure, Jan, a personal style spray; Sherry Pie - Sherry Pie's Aura Pie, an expensive pie that improves one's aura; Widow Von'Du - Throaté, a throat coating spray; On the runway, category is Black Wedding. Crystal Methyd, Heidi N Closet, Jackie Cox and Jaida Essence Hall receive positive critiques, with Heidi N Closet winning the challenge. Gigi Goode, Jan, Sherry Pie and Widow Von'Du receive negative critiques, with Gigi Goode and Sherry Pie being safe. Jan and Widow Von'Du lip-sync to "This Is My Night" by Chaka Khan. Widow Von'Du wins the lip-sync and Jan sashays away.: Guest Judge: Chaka Khan; Alternating Judge: Ross Mathews; Mini–Challenge: In pairs, create a box of FabFitFun products for another duo, then gift it to them with shade; Mini–Challenge Winners: Gigi Goode and Jackie Cox; Mini–Challenge Prize: A $1,000 cash tip and a 1 year subscription to FabFitFun; Main Challenge: Create and market products for the new drag queen lifestyle brand "Droop"; Runway Theme: Black Wedding; Challenge Winner: Heidi N Closet; Challenge Prize: A $5,000 cash tip; Bottom Two: Jan and Widow Von'Du; Lip-Sync Song: "This Is My Night" by Chaka Khan; Eliminated: Jan; Farewell Message: "Sisters, I'am so happy I got to share this experience with you. Stay humble, grateful, & remember, you're on RuPaul's Drag Race!! :)) I Love you, Jan💋"
154	9	"Choices 2020"	April 24, 2020
For this week's mini-challenge, the queens will audition for Kitty Girl 2020. Jackie Cox wins the mini-challenge. For the main challenge, the queens will participate in a presidential debate called "Choices 2020". On the runway, category is Stars and Stripes Forever. Crystal Methyd, Heidi N Closet and Jaida Essence Hall receive positive critiques, with Jaida Essence Hall winning the challenge. Gigi Goode, Jackie Cox and Widow Von'Du receive negative critiques, with Gigi Goode being safe. Jackie Cox and Widow Von'Du lip-sync to "Firework" by Katy Perry. Jackie Cox wins the lip-sync and Widow Von'Du sashays away.: Guest Judges: Jeff Goldblum and Rachel Bloom; Alternating Judge: Carson Kressley (Note: Michelle Visage was not on the judging panel for this episode.); Mini–Challenge: Audition for Kitty Girl 2020 sponsored by PrettyLitter; Mini–Challenge Winner: Jackie Cox; Mini–Challenge Prize: A $2,500 gift card from Fierce Drag Jewels; Main Challenge: Participate in a presidential debate called "Choices 2020"; Runway Theme: Stars and Stripes Forever; Challenge Winner: Jaida Essence Hall; Challenge Prize: A $5,000 cash tip; Bottom Two: Jackie Cox and Widow Von'Du; Lip-Sync Song: "Firework" by Katy Perry; Eliminated: Widow Von'Du; Farewell Message: "I hope I made you proud Kansas City! Remember, yes Bitch You Might Be! P.S. Heidi unlike those other girls I'm Not Leaving you A Damn thing ♡W"
155	10	"Superfan Makeover"	May 1, 2020
For this week's main challenge, the queens will makeover Drag Race superfans. On the runway, category is Drag Family Resemblance. Crystal Methyd, Jaida Essence Hall and Sherry Pie receive positive critiques, with Jaida Essence Hall winning the challenge. Heidi N Closet and Jackie Cox receive negative critiques, and are announced as the bottom two. They lip-sync to "Kill the Lights" by Alex Newell and DJ Cassidy ft. Nile Rodgers. They are both declared the winners of the lip-sync and no one goes home.: Guest Judge: Daisy Ridley; Alternating Judge: Ross Mathews; Main Challenge: Makeover Drag Race superfans; Runway Theme: Drag Family Resemblance; Challenge Winner: Jaida Essence Hall; Challenge Prize: A $5,000 cash tip for Jaida Essence Hall, and a $5,000 gift card to Shop Betsey Johnson for Jazz Essence Hall; Bottom Two: Heidi N Closet and Jackie Cox; Lip-Sync Song: "Kill the Lights" by Alex Newell and DJ Cassidy ft. Nile Rodgers; Eliminated: None
156	11	"One-Queen Show"	May 8, 2020
For this week's mini-challenge, the queens will have a bitchfest with puppets. Jackie Cox wins the mini-challenge. For the main challenge, the queens will create and perform in your own one woman show.: Crystal Methyd - Phenomenal Phil: Exotic Dance Instructor; Gigi Goode - Welcome Aboard Brimstone Airways; Heidi N Closet - Cookout with your Cheeks Out; Jackie Cox - Between Two Parents; Jaida Essence Hall - Putting the "P" in Pageant; Sherry Pie - Bubbles and Sherry; On the runway, category is The Color Purple. Crystal Methyd and Jackie Cox receive positive critiques, with Crystal Methyd winning the challenge. Heidi N Closet, Jaida Essence Hall and Sherry Pie receive negative critiques, with Sherry Pie being safe. Heidi N Closet and Jaida Essence Hall lip-sync to "1999" by Prince. Jaida Essence Hall wins the lip-sync and Heidi N Closet sashays away.: Guest Judge: Whoopi Goldberg; Alternating Judge: Ross Mathews; Mini–Challenge: Everybody Loves Puppets; Mini-Challenge Winner: Jackie Cox; Main Challenge: Create and perform in your own one woman show; Runway Theme: The Color Purple; Challenge Winner: Crystal Methyd; Challenge Prize: A $5,000 cash tip; Bottom Two: Heidi N Closet and Jaida Essence Hall; Lip-Sync Song: "1999" by Prince; Eliminated: Heidi N Closet; Farewell Message: "Remember to stay Soft & Supple and always (Insert stolen catchphrase here). Love. Heidi... Something 💋"
157	12	"Viva Drag Vegas"	May 15, 2020
For this week's mini-challenge, the queens will create an over-the-top, one-of-a-kind showgirl headdress. Gigi Goode wins the mini-challenge. For the final challenge of the season, the queens will perform a medley of songs from RuPaul's Drag Race Live! On the runway, category is Eleganza Extravaganza. Gigi Goode and Jaida Essence Hall receive positive critiques, with Gigi Goode winning the challenge. Crystal Methyd and Jackie Cox receive negative critiques, and are announced as the bottom two. They lip-sync to "On the Floor" by Jennifer Lopez ft. Pitbull. Crystal Methyd wins the lip-sync and Jackie Cox sashays away.: Guest Judge: Jamal Sims; Alternating Judge: Carson Kressley and Ross Mathews; Mini–Challenge: Create an over-the-top, one-of-a-kind showgirl headdress; Mini-Challenge Winner: Gigi Goode; Mini-Challenge Prize: A trip for two to Las Vegas, including airfare, accommodation, and tickets to see RuPaul's Drag Race Live; Main Challenge: Perform a medley of songs from RuPaul's Drag Race Live!; Runway Theme: Eleganza Extravaganza; Challenge Winner: Gigi Goode; Challenge Prize: A $5,000 cash tip; Bottom Two: Crystal Methyd and Jackie Cox; Lip-Sync Song: "On the Floor" by Jennifer Lopez ft. Pitbull; Eliminated: Jackie Cox; Disqualified: Sherry Pie; Note: This is the last episode of the season to include Sherry Pie, as she was disqualified from the competition prior to the filming of the reunion and finale episodes.
158	13	"Alone Together"	May 22, 2020
RuPaul and the queens reunite to discuss the season's highlights and drama during a "virtual slumber party" while in quarantine due to the COVID-19 pandemic. Discussions include: Aiden Zhane and Brita's beef, Rock M Sakura's heartbreaking elimination, Nicky Doll being a fan favorite, Dahlia Sin storming off set after her elimination and Jan crying when Brita was sent home and being upset after not winning the Rusical episode.
159	14	"Grand Finale"	May 29, 2020
For the first time a virtual finale is held from remote locations across the country due to the effects of COVID-19. For the first lip-sync, the queens will all lip-sync to "Bring Back My Girls" by RuPaul, with only their faces showing. The final three queens will then all lip-sync alone to a song of their choice. Crystal Methyd lip-syncs to "I'm Like a Bird" by Nelly Furtado, Gigi Goode lip-syncs to "Take On Me" by A-ha and Jaida Essence Hall lip-syncs to "Get Up" by Ciara ft. Chamillionaire. It is then announced that Heidi N Closet is this season's Miss Congeniality. For the final lip-sync, Crystal Methyd, Gigi Goode and Jaida Essence Hall lip-sync to "Survivor" by Destiny's Child. It is announced that Jaida Essence Hall is the winner, leaving Crystal Methyd and Gigi Goode as the runners-up.: Miss Congeniality: Heidi N Closet; Final Three: Crystal Methyd, Gigi Goode and Jaida Essence Hall; Lip-Sync Song: "Survivor" by Destiny's Child; Runners-up: Crystal Methyd & Gigi Goode; Winner of RuPaul's Drag Race Season Twelve: Jaida Essence Hall

== Disqualification ==
"In light of recent developments and Sherry Pie’s statement, Sherry Pie has been disqualified from RuPaul’s Drag Race. Out of respect for the hard work of the other queens, VH1 will air the season as planned. Sherry will not appear in the grand finale scheduled to be filmed later this spring."

— Statement from VH1 and World of Wonder.

On March 4, 2020, Ben Shimkus, a 25-year-old actor, posted an update to Facebook detailing his experiences with the contestant Sherry Pie, whose real name is Joey Gugliemelli, and accusing him of catfishing when the two studied together in the musical theater program at SUNY Cortland. Shimkus' post alleged that Gugliemelli deceived him using a fake identity of "Allison Mossey" to make promises of a musical career on Broadway. Shimkus also claimed that Gugliemelli coerced him into sending sexually suggestive fetish videos as part of the audition process.

In these videos, Shimkus was asked to play the character of Jeff, a steroid-dependent individual obsessed with growing muscle and gaining physical strength. In the script provided by Gugliemelli, Shimkus explained, the character of Jeff was supposed to appear ostensibly pleased with his body odor that resulted from taking steroids.

In an article with BuzzFeed News published on March 5, 2020, four other men came forward with similar allegations of Gugliemelli posing as Mossey and leading them to believe that recording sexually daring audition videos would increase their chances of being noticed by casting directors.

Another former classmate at SUNY Cortland alleged that Gugliemelli similarly deceived him to film various provocative scenes wearing revealing clothing as part of his audition for a musical production of The Nightmare Before Christmas, which he was told was affiliated with the director Tim Burton. One victim claimed that Gugliemelli had explicitly asked them to masturbate on camera. As of March 6, 2020, a total of seven victims of Gugliemelli's alleged misconduct have come forward, including Season 12 contestant Jackie Cox.

Gugliemelli posted an apology on his Facebook page, staying that he was sorry for "[causing] such trauma and pain" and that he had been "seeking help and receiving treatment since coming back to NYC". On March 6, 2020, VH1 released a statement regarding the incident, and made the decision to disqualify Gugliemelli from the contest. According to the statement, the season would air as planned but Gugliemelli would not appear in the live finale. After both episodes 3 and 5, wherein Sherry Pie won the challenge and received $5,000 cash tips, World of Wonder donated $5,000 to The Trevor Project.

The contestant was originally one of the Top 4 queens, alongside Gigi Goode, Crystal Methyd and Jaida Essence Hall but due to her disqualification, she finished in 4th place, resulting in Season 12 being the first to feature a top 3 since Season 8.

== Awards ==
At the 72nd Primetime Emmy Awards the season won the Primetime Emmy Award for Outstanding Reality Competition Program. With "I'm That Bitch" as the submitted episode, it also won:

- Outstanding Costumes For A Variety, Nonfiction Or Reality Program
- Outstanding Picture Editing For A Structured Reality Or Competition Program
- Outstanding Contemporary Hairstyling For A Variety, Nonfiction Or Reality Program
- Outstanding Contemporary Makeup For A Variety, Nonfiction Or Reality Program (Non-Prosthetic)
- Outstanding Casting for a Reality Program

Rupaul also won for Outstanding Host For A Reality Or Competition Program.

== Ratings ==
Viewership and ratings per episode of RuPaul's Drag Race season 12
No.	Title	Air date	Rating (18–49)	Viewers (millions)
1	"I'm That Bitch"	February 28, 2020	0.19	0.504
2	"You Don't Know Me"	March 6, 2020	0.24	0.558
3	"World's Worst"	March 13, 2020	0.23	0.542
4	"The Ball Ball"	March 20, 2020	0.33	0.678
5	"Gay's Anatomy"	March 27, 2020	0.29	0.630
6	"Snatch Game"	April 3, 2020	0.36	0.708
7	"Madonna: The Unauthorized Rusical"	April 10, 2020	0.34	0.731
8	"Droop"	April 17, 2020	0.29	0.633
9	"Choices 2020"	April 24, 2020	0.35	0.688
10	"Superfan Makeover"	May 1, 2020	0.34	0.701
11	"One-Queen Show"	May 8, 2020	0.25	0.607
12	"Viva Drag Vegas"	May 15, 2020	0.33	0.695
13	"Alone Together"	May 22, 2020	0.25	0.597
14	"Grand Finale"	May 29, 2020	0.34	0.658
