= I'm That Bitch (RuPaul's Drag Race) =

- RuPaul's Drag Race episode
- Episode no.: Season 12; Episode 1
- Directed by: Nick Murray
- Original air date: February 28, 2020

Guest appearance
- Nicki Minaj

Episode chronology
← Previous "Grand Finale"	Next → "You Don't Know Me"

"I'm That Bitch" is the first episode of the twelfth season of RuPaul's Drag Race. It originally aired on February 28, 2020. The episode's mini-challenge tasks contestants with presenting two looks in a fashion show and the main challenge has them perform to the song "I'm That Bitch". Nicki Minaj is a guest judge.

Widow Von'Du wins the main challenge, and no one is eliminated from the competition. The episode won in multiple categories at the 72nd Primetime Emmy Awards, including Outstanding Hairstyling for a Variety, Nonfiction or Reality Program, Outstanding Makeup for a Variety, Nonfiction or Reality Program, and Outstanding Picture Editing for a Structured Reality or Competition Program.

== Episode ==
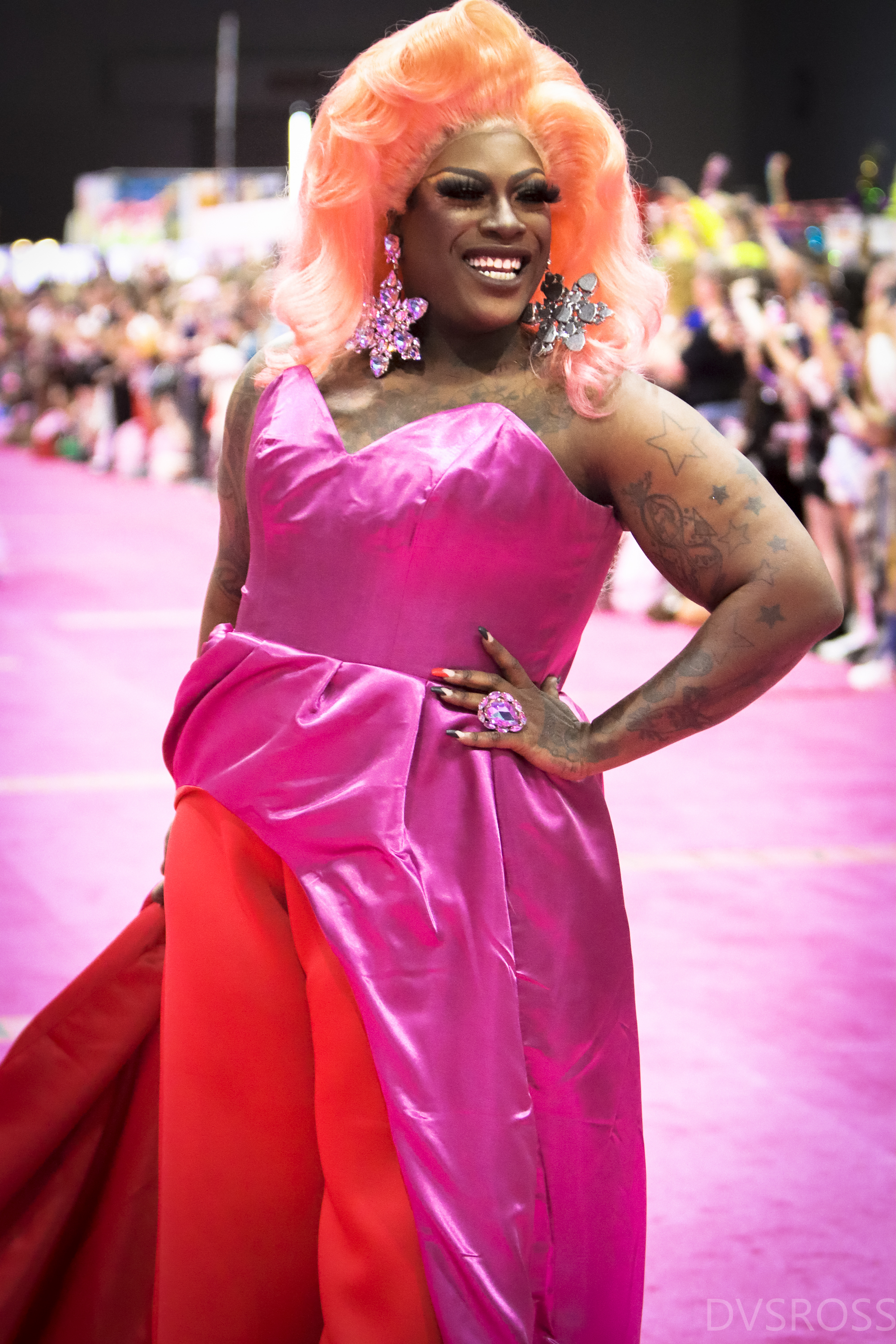
Widow Von'Du (pictured at RuPaul's DragCon LA in 2022) wins the episode's main challenge.

Half of the season's contestants enter the Werk Room in the following order: Brita, Nicky Doll, Widow Von'Du, Jackie Cox, Heidi N Closet, Gigi Goode, and Crystal Methyd. RuPaul greets the contestants and reveals the mini-challenge: to present springs and fall looks in a fashion show. Watching the fashion show are Carson Kressley, Michelle Visage, RuPaul, and Raven, as well as impersonators of Kim Kardashian and Kanye West. Heidi N Closet's headpiece falls off when she shows her spring look. The contestants re-enter the Werk Room and get out of drag. RuPaul reveals the main challenge, which has contestants write a verse and perform choreography for the song "I'm That Bitch".

The contestants decide to have Heidi N Closet and Widow Von'Du co-lead on choreography and rehearse on the main stage. Back in the Werk Room, the contestants prepare for the runway and Heidi N Closet shares that she had an allergic reaction and had to go to the emergency room. Jackie Cox discusses her Persian heritage, and Nicky Doll talks about her coming out experience. The contestants also talk about how the rehearsal went.

On the main stage, RuPaul welcomes fellow judges Visage and Kressley, as well as guest judge Nicki Minaj. The contestants perform "I'm That Bitch". The runway category is Sparkle. After the show, the judges critique the contestants. The contestants leave the main stage so the judges can deliberate. Brita, Gigi Goode, Jackie Cox, and Widow Von'Du receive positive critiques. Heidi N Closet and Nicky Doll receive negative critiques. Gigi Goode and Widow Von'Du are the top two contestants of the week; the two face off in a lip-sync contest for the win to "Starships" (2012) by Minaj. Widow Von'Du is declared the winner and RuPaul reveals that no one will be eliminated this episode.

== Production ==
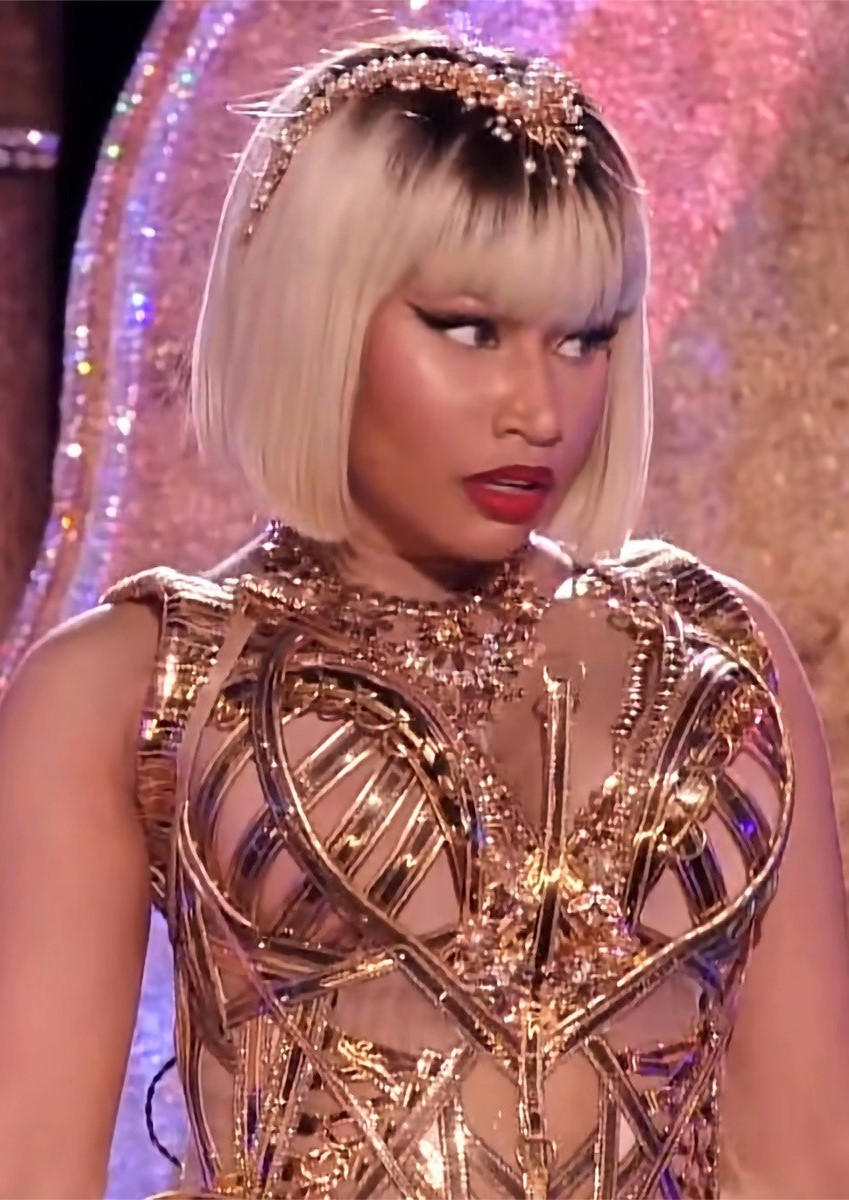
Nicki Minaj (pictured in 2018) is a guest judge.

The episode originally aired on February 28, 2020. The song "I'm That Bitch", which has been described as a "bitch track", was written by RuPaul, Leland, Freddy Scott, and Tom Campbell. On the episode, RuPaul asks Minaj to write and perform a verse for the song. Heidi N Closet included the "Starships" performance in Billboard's list of her four "fiercest" lip-syncs of the season.

=== Fashion ===
For the fashion show, Crystal Methyd's fall look was inspired by Freddy Krueger. For the final runway, Brita wears a jumpsuit with mirrors. Crystal Methyd's red outfit is devil-inspired. Gigi Goode wears a green glittered suit with a black helmet, and Heidi N Closet has a gown. Nicky Doll's outfit has metallic feathers.

== Reception and recognition ==
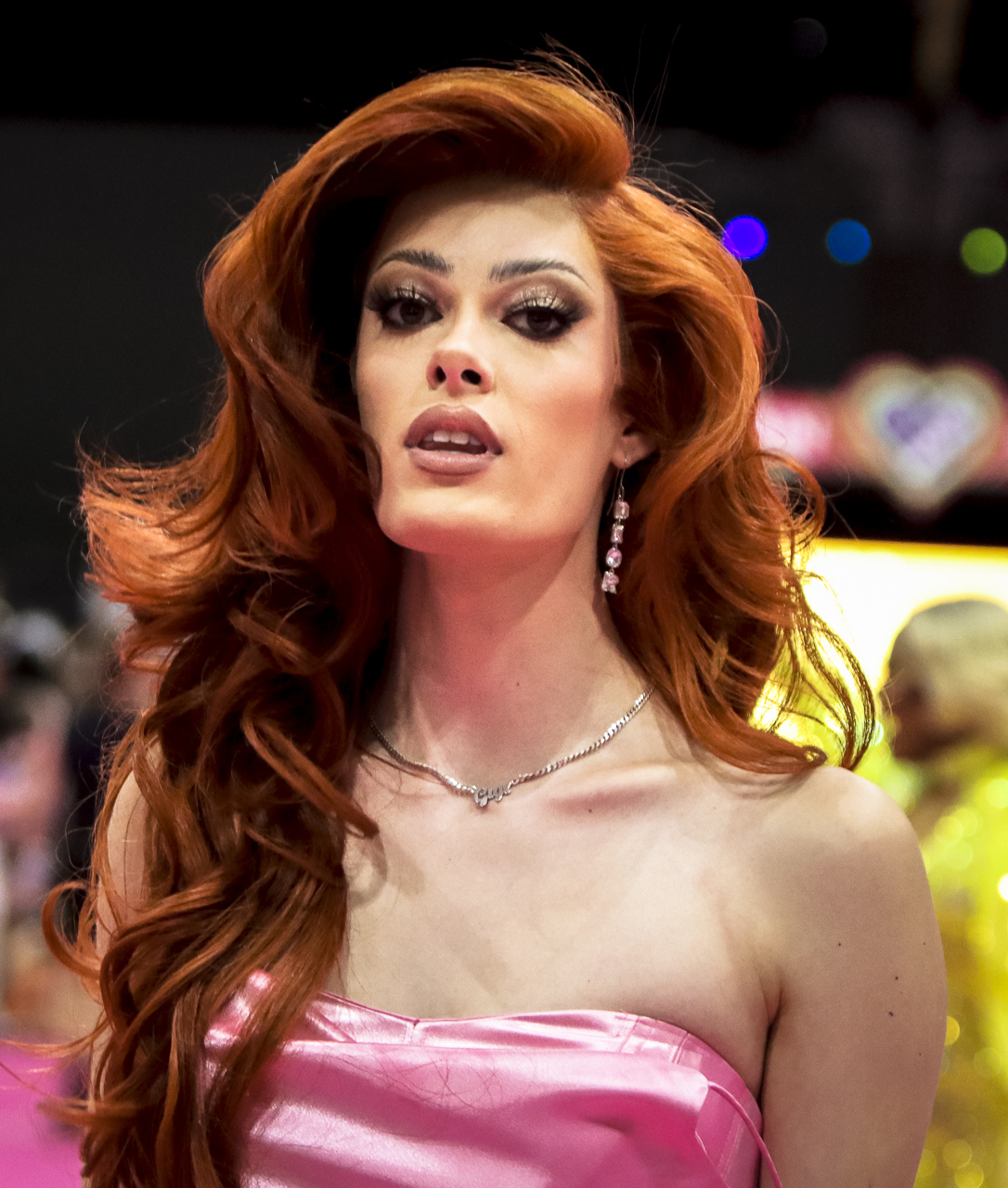
Gay Times described Gigi Goode's (pictured at RuPaul's DragCon LA in 2022) lip-sync performance as "kooky".

Kate Kulzick of The A.V. Club gave the episode a rating of 'A-'. Nylon said Widow Von'Du delivered a "gravity-defying, back-bending, almost scarily flexible" lip-sync performance. In 2020, Ryan Shea of Instinct magazine said Widow Von'Du "literally broke her body in order to win". In a 2021 review of the first episode of the show's thirteen season, Shea wrote: "The girls then pull out all the stops on the main runway with their colorful fashions, cute choreography and lyrics that fit their personalities. This, IMHO, paled in comparison to the season 12 girls who did 'I'm That Bitch' right in front of Nicki Minaj, but it was still entertaining nonetheless." Gay Times said Crystal Methyd's rap "[channeled] The Powerful Girls’ queer anti-christ HIM" and described Gigi Goode's lip-sync performance as "kooky".

Amii Johnson included "I'm That Bitch" in Screen Rant's 2021 list of the ten best episodes, according to IMDb, with a score of 9.1 out of 10. Johnson wrote, "When Ru revealed the main challenge of the episode as a rap battle, to be performed with Nicki, tensions were running high and the queens began to feel the pressure. It's no surprise that this episode is ranked so well; in a contest of best guest judges, Nicki Minaj is one of the best and provided insightful critiques that helped queens like Heidi N Closet improve later in the competition." In 2022, the website's Ariana Bascom said "Starships" was the season's best lip-sync. Bascom wrote, "Gigi proved herself to be more than just a fashion queen with her comedic performance to Nicki Minaj's Starships. But Widow performed at 110%, throwing in dance moves and some double-jointed tricks. Widow won the lip sync, starting the season off on a high note." Similarly, Marcus Wratten of PinkNews said "Starships" was the season's best lip-sync in 2025. As of 2024, "Starships" was the show's "most-watched competitive lip sync" on YouTube.

The episode received multiple nominations at the 72nd Primetime Emmy Awards. Jamie Martin, Michael Roha, Paul Cross, Michael Lynn Deis and Ryan Mallick won in the Outstanding Picture Editing for a Structured Reality or Competition Program category. The episode also won in the categories Outstanding Hairstyling for a Variety, Nonfiction or Reality Program and Outstanding Makeup for a Variety, Nonfiction or Reality Program. Nick Murray was nominated in the Outstanding Directing for a Reality Program category, and Glenn Gaines, Ryan Brady, Erik Valenzuela, and Sal Ojeda were nominated in the Outstanding Sound Mixing for a Nonfiction Program (Single or Multi-Camera) category. Zaldy Goco was nominated in the Outstanding Costumes for a Variety, Nonfiction, or Reality Programming category.

== See also ==
- Nicki Minaj videography
