= Dahlia Sin =

American drag performer

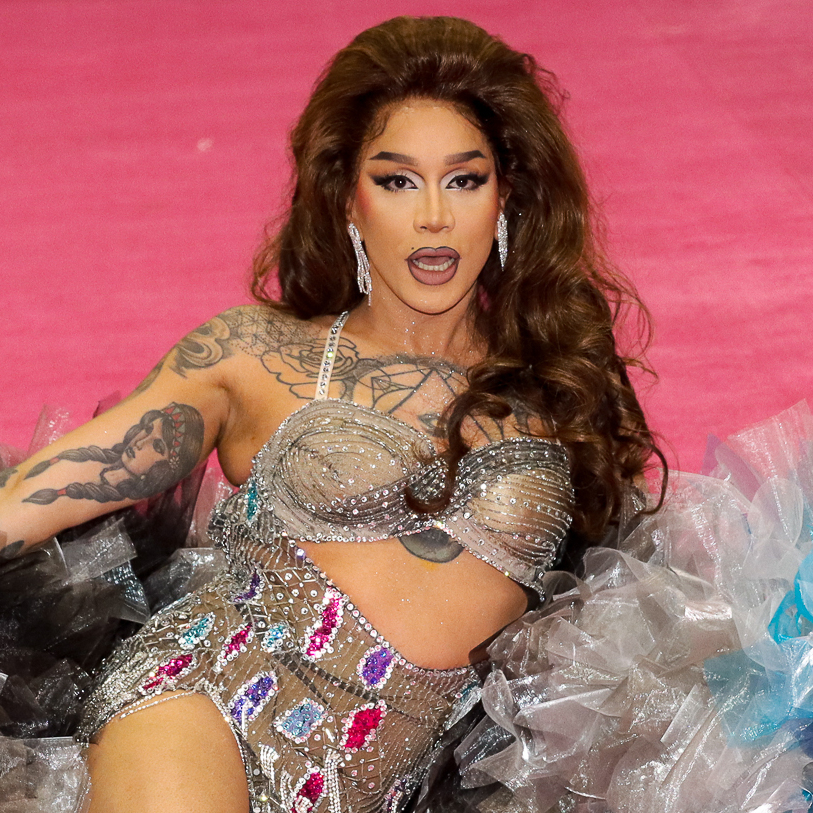
- Dahlia Sin at RuPaul's DragCon LA, 2024
- Born: Erick Anthony Green; May 13, 1991 (age 35); Clarkston, Michigan, U.S.
- Occupation: Drag queen
- Television: RuPaul's Drag Race (season 12)

Dahlia Sin is the stage name of Erick Anthony Green (born May 13, c. 1991), an American drag performer most known for competing on the twelfth season of RuPaul's Drag Race. She is a "drag daughter" of fellow Drag Race contestant Aja and a member of the Haus of Aja. Season 13 and Season 16 contestants Kandy and Xunami Muse are "drag sisters".

== Career ==
Dahlia Sin began performing in drag in 2012 and competed on the twelfth season of RuPaul's Drag Race. She was the first contestant to be eliminated. Her drag name originates from the Black Dahlia murder and the seven deadly sins.

In 2025, she appeared alongside Aja and Kandy Muse as backup singers for Amyl and the Sniffers’ performance on The Tonight Show Starring Jimmy Fallon.

== Personal life ==
Dahlia Sin is originally from Clarkston, Michigan and grew up in Brooklyn, New York and Phoenix, Arizona and currently lives in New York City. She has described herself as a "tattooed beauty doll", and was previously a club kid and sex worker.

== Filmography ==
=== Television ===
- RuPaul's Drag Race

=== Web series ===
- Bring Back My Girls (2022)
