= Sherry Pie =

American drag performer

- Born: Joseph Gugliemelli; Saratoga Springs, New York, U.S.
- Education: State University of New York, Cortland
- Occupation: Drag queen
- Television: RuPaul's Drag Race (season 12)
- Website: misssherrypie.com

Joseph "Joey" Gugliemelli, best known by the stage name Sherry Pie, is an American drag performer most known for being disqualified from the twelfth season of RuPaul's Drag Race.

Following multiple revelations of sexual misconduct, Sherry Pie was disqualified from the show and mostly edited out of the American broadcast; initial overseas screenings retained the original edit. Sherry originally placed as one of the top four queens of the season, alongside Gigi Goode, Crystal Methyd, and Jaida Essence Hall but due to her disqualification did not participate in the finale.

== RuPaul's Drag Race ==
"In light of recent developments and Sherry Pie's statement, Sherry Pie has been disqualified from RuPaul's Drag Race. Out of respect for the hard work of the other queens, VH1 will air the season as planned. Sherry will not appear in the grand finale scheduled to be filmed later this spring."

— Statement from VH1 and World of Wonder

On March 4, 2020, Sherry was accused by a victim who posted an update to the social media site Facebook detailing his experiences with Sherry Pie and accusing him of catfishing when the two studied together in the musical theater program at State University of New York College at Cortland. His post alleged that Gugliemelli deceived him using a fake identity of "Allison Mossey" to make promises of a musical career on Broadway. He also claimed that Gugliemelli coerced him into sending sexually suggestive fetish videos as part of the audition process.

In an article with BuzzFeed News published on March 5, 2020, four other men came forward with similar allegations of Gugliemelli posing as Mossey and leading them to believe that recording sexually during audition videos would increase their chances of being noticed by casting directors.

Another former classmate at SUNY Cortland alleged that Gugliemelli similarly deceived him to film various provocative scenes wearing revealing clothing as part of his audition for a musical production of The Nightmare Before Christmas, which he was told was affiliated with the director Tim Burton. One victim claimed that Gugliemelli had explicitly asked them to masturbate on camera. As of March 6, 2020, a total of seven victims of Gugliemelli's alleged misconduct have come forward.

Gugliemelli posted an apology on his Facebook page, writing that he was sorry for "[causing] such trauma and pain" and that he had been "seeking help and receiving treatment since coming back to NYC". On March 6, 2020, VH1 released a statement regarding the incident and made the decision to disqualify Gugliemelli from the contest. According to the statement, the season would air as planned but Gugliemelli would not appear in the live finale. After both episodes three and five, wherein Sherry Pie won the challenge and received $5,000 cash tips, World of Wonder donated $5,000 to The Trevor Project.

Sherry was one of the four queens who progressed to the final, but did not participate in it due to her disqualification; this resulted in season 12 being the first to feature a top three since season 8.

== Filmography ==
=== Television ===
- RuPaul's Drag Race, season 12 as contestant (disqualified)
- RuPaul's Drag Race: Untucked (season 12) as contestant
- The Tamron Hall Show as guest

== See also ==
- LGBT culture in New York City
- List of LGBT people from New York City
