= Rock M. Sakura =

American drag performer

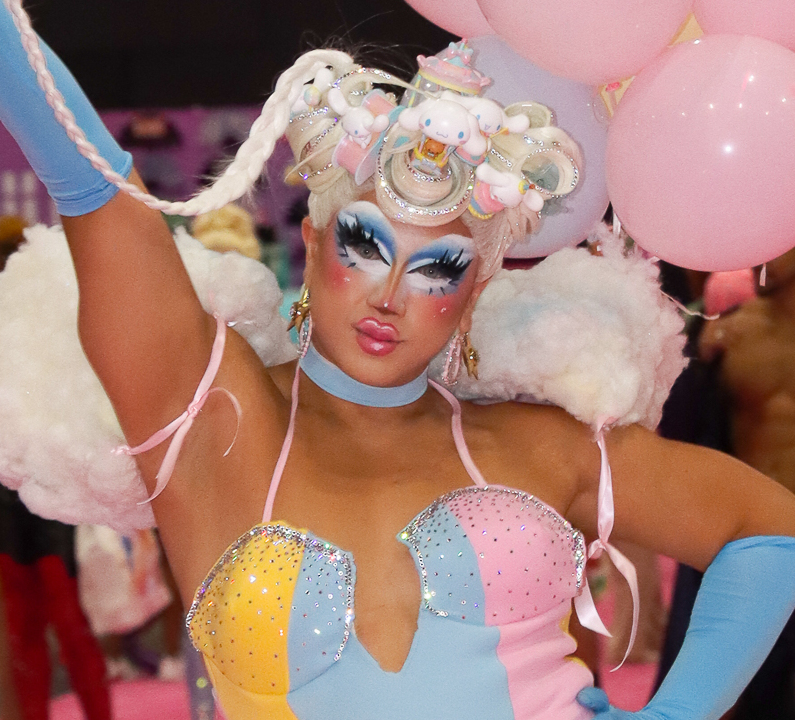
- Rock M. Sakura at RuPaul's DragCon LA, 2024
- Born: Bryan Steven Bradford; October 15, 1990 (age 36); San Jose, California, U.S.
- Education: De Anza College
- Occupation: Drag queen
- Known for: RuPaul's Drag Race (season 12)
- Website: rockmsakura.com

Bryan Steven Bradford, better known by the stage name Rock M. Sakura, is an American drag performer most known for competing on the twelfth season of RuPaul's Drag Race.

== Early life and education ==
Bradford is Filipino and Vietnamese. He was born and raised in San Jose, California, and attended Adrian C. Wilcox High School in Santa Clara. He studied animation and illustration at De Anza College.

== Career ==
In 2020, Bradford competed as Rock M. Sakura on the twelfth season of RuPaul's Drag Race coming in 12th of 13 and participated in the Halloween variety special Bring Back My Ghouls.

In April 2020, amid the coronavirus pandemic, Rock M. Sakura was announced as a featured cast member for the very first Digital Drag Fest, an online drag festival for all ages, with attendees given opportunities to interact with the artists, tip them, and win prizes during the broadcast.

His mockumentary series Rock M. Sakura Sexy Superhero Sickening Spectacular premiered in 2021. In 2022, he was nominated in the 2022 WOWIE Awards in the category Best YouTube Channel (The Like, Comment and Subscribe Award).

== Personal life ==
Bradford lives in San Francisco, and enjoys anime and gaming. In 2021, following a series of attacks on Asian American sex workers, he acknowledged his own history of sex work.

== Filmography ==
=== Film ===
- The Bitch Who Stole Christmas (2021)

=== Television ===
- RuPaul's Drag Race (season 12, 2020)
- Bring Back My Ghouls (2020)
- Rock M. Sakura Sexy Superhero Sickening Spectacular (2021)
- Drag House Rules (2025)

=== Web series ===
Year	Title	Role	Notes	Ref
2022	Bring Back My Girls	Herself	Guest	
2022	Fashion Photo RuView: Drag race Philippines season 1	Herself	Host	
2023	Give It to Me Straight	Herself	Guest	
