= Aiden Zhane =

American drag performer

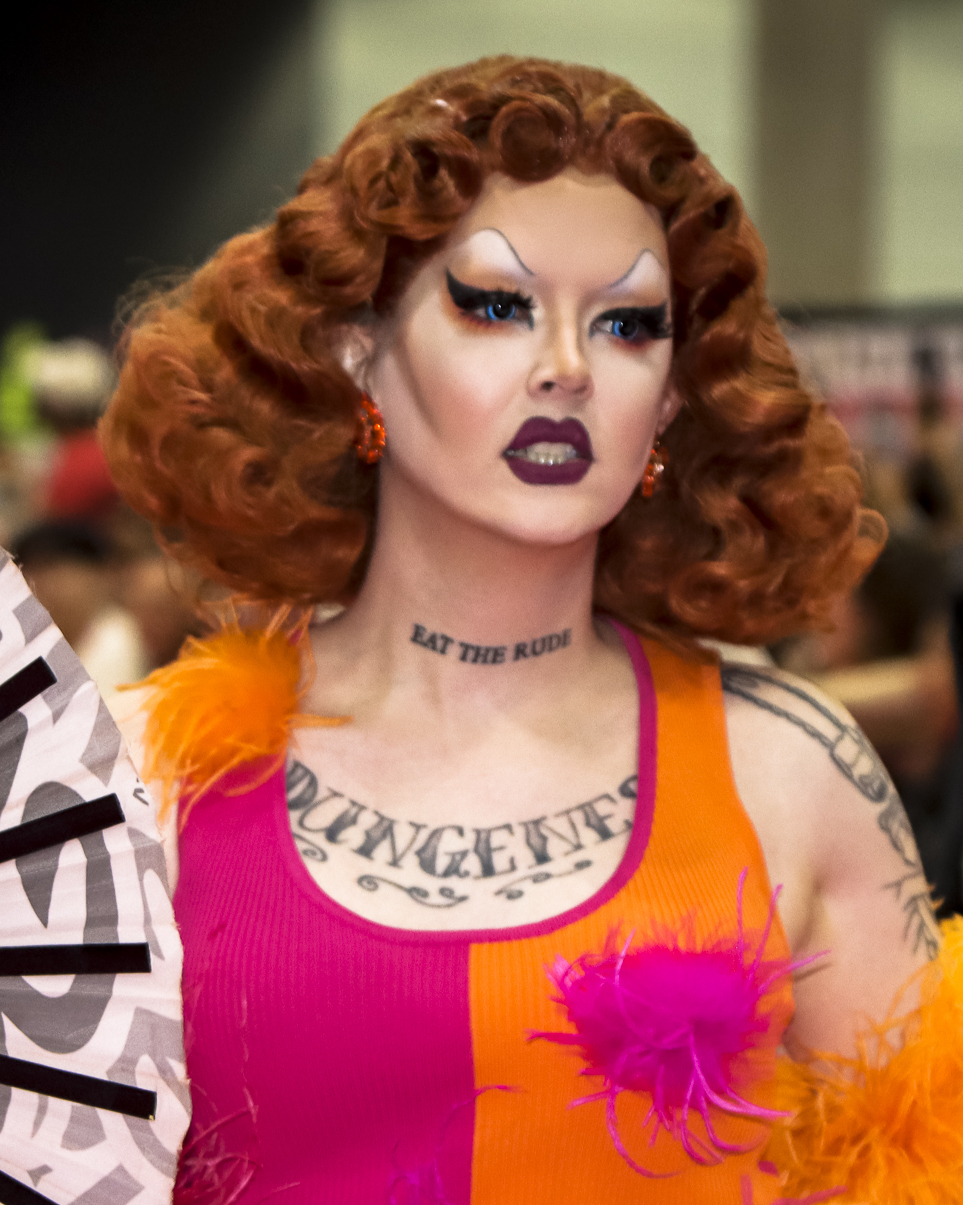
- Aiden Zhane at RuPaul's DragCon LA, 2022
- Born: Devin LaMar Lewis; July 16, 1990 (age 36); Howell, Michigan, U.S.
- Occupation: Drag queen
- Known for: RuPaul's Drag Race (season 12)

Aiden Zhane is the stage name of Devin LaMar Lewis, an American drag performer most known for competing on the twelfth season of RuPaul's Drag Race.

== Early life ==
Zhane was born in Howell and raised in Cohoctah, Michigan. She later moved to Acworth, Georgia.

== Career ==
Aiden began her drag career in the early 2010s while living in Acworth, Georgia. She selected her stage name to represent "both ends of the spectrum" as A and Z are the first and last letters of the alphabet. She initially performed mostly at home as a self-described "bedroom queen" due to the lack of gay bars in her town. Despite proximity to Atlanta, Zhane experienced difficulty breaking into the city's drag scene early in her career and only occasionally performed there.

Aiden was announced as a cast member on season 12 of RuPaul's Drag Race on January 23, 2020. Zhane was eliminated on the sixth episode of the season, placing tenth in the competition. Along with Brita Filter, she was up for elimination following her performance in the Snatch Game challenge. Zhane's impersonation of Patricia Quinn from The Rocky Horror Picture Show was criticized by the show's judges and Quinn herself. She then lost a lip-sync against Brita to "Let It Go" from Frozen. Along with the other season 12 Drag Race contestants, Zhane appeared in Bring Back My Ghouls, a Halloween variety special produced by World of Wonder. Since appearing on Drag Race, Zhane has released three singles.

== Personal life ==
Zhane was previously in a relationship with Saint (formerly St. Lucia), who competed on season 3 of The Boulet Brothers' Dragula. In an interview with Entertainment Weekly, Aiden described introducing Saint to drag.

== Discography ==
Singles

- "Boo!" (featuring Saint)
- "Gein"
- "Love Song"

== Filmography ==
=== Film ===
Year	Title	Role	Notes	Ref
TBD	In The Valley	Bartender #2 / Being	Short film	

=== Television ===
Year	Title	Role	Notes	Ref
2020	RuPaul's Drag Race (season 12)	Herself	Contestant (9th Place)	
2020	RuPaul's Drag Race: Untucked	Herself	Contestant	

=== Web series ===
Year	Title	Role	Notes	Ref
2020	Bring Back My Ghouls	Herself	Guest	
	Bring Back My Girls	Herself	Guest	
