= Droop (RuPaul's Drag Race) =

- RuPaul's Drag Race episode
- Episode no.: Season 12; Episode 8
- Presented by: RuPaul
- Original air date: April 17, 2020

Episode chronology
← Previous "Madonna: The Unauthorized Rusical"	Next → "Choices 2020"

"Droop" is the eighth episode of the twelfth season of the American television series RuPaul's Drag Race. It originally aired on April 17, 2020. The episode's main challenge tasks the contestants with creating and marketing products for the lifestyle brand Droop. Chaka Khan is a guest judge. Heidi N Closet wins the episode's main challenge. Jan is eliminated from the competition after placing in the bottom and losing a lip-sync contest against Widow Von'Du to "This Is My Night" by Khan.

== Episode ==
For the episode's mini-challenge, the contestants are tasked with pairing up and creating a box of FabFitFun products for another duo, then gifting it to them with shade. Gigi Goode and Jackie Cox win the mini-challenge.

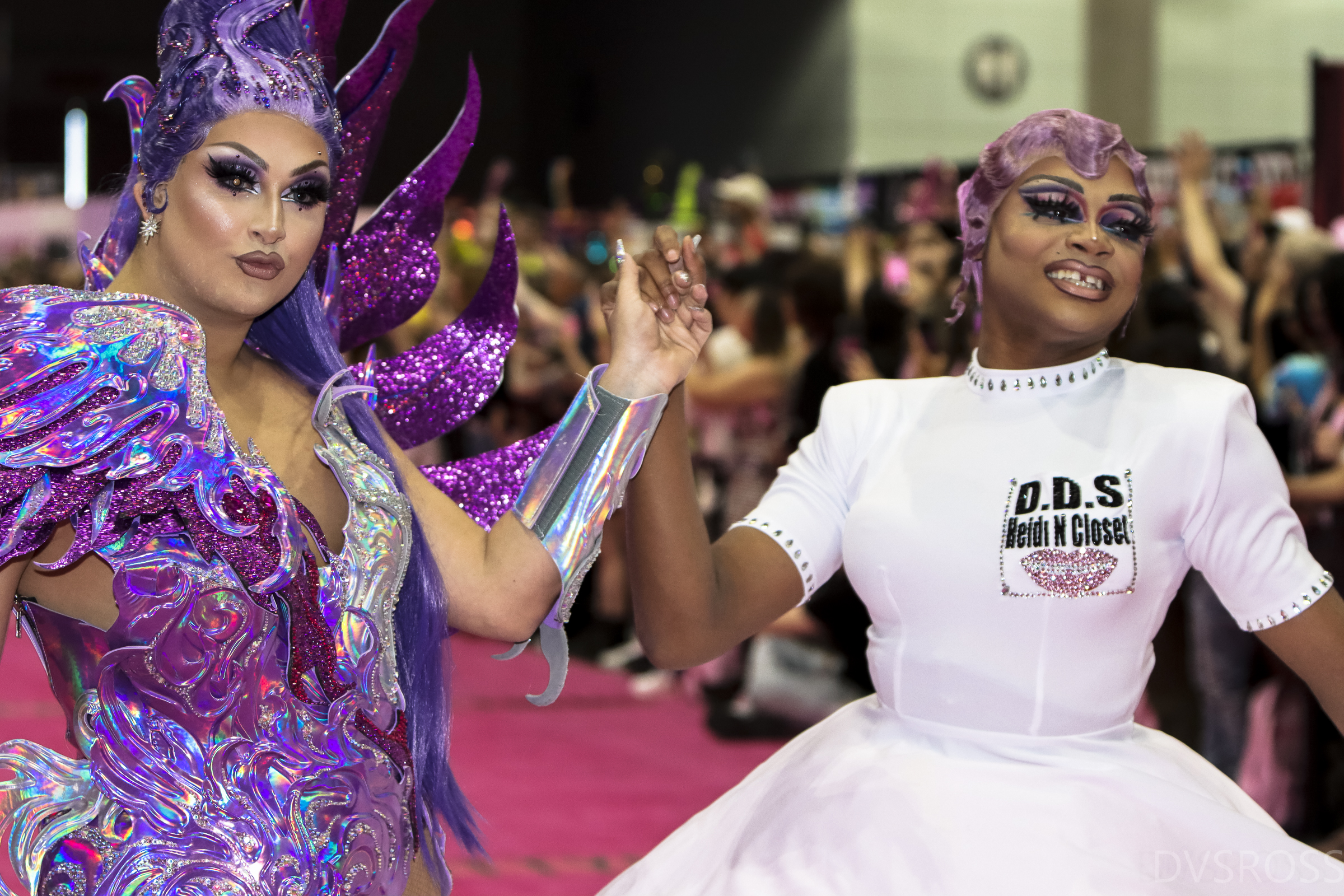
Jan (left), who is eliminated from the competition, and Heidi N Closet (right), who win's the episode's main challenge, at RuPaul's DragCon LA in 2022.

For the main challenge, the contestants are tasked with creating and marketing products for the new drag queen lifestyle brand Droop. Following are the contestants and their products:

- Crystal Methyd – The Magic Mullet, a collection of mullets
- Gigi Goode – Goode Night Bitch, a fragrance and sleeping aid
- Heidi N Closet – Heidi's Hydrates Multipurpose Lotion, a hydrating lotion
- Jackie Cox – Jackie's Magic Carpet Merkins, a collection of merkins
- Jaida Essence Hall – Luxuratuck, diamond-encrusted panties
- Jan – Sure, Jan, a personal style spray
- Sherry Pie – Sherry Pie's Aura Pie, an expensive pie that improves one's aura
- Widow Von'Du – Throaté, a throat coating spray

On the main stage, RuPaul welcomes fellow judges as well as guest judge Chaka Khan. The runway category is Black Wedding. Crystal Methyd, Heidi N Closet, Jackie Cox, and Jaida Essence Hall receive positive critiques, and Heidi N Closet wins the challenge. Gigi Goode, Jan, Sherry Pie, and Widow Von'Du receive negative critiques, and Gigi Goode and Sherry Pie are deemed safe. Jan and Widow Von'Du place in the bottom and face off in a lip-sync contest to "This Is My Night" (1985) by Khan. Widow Von'Du wins the lip-sync and Jan is eliminated from the competition.

== Production and broadcast ==
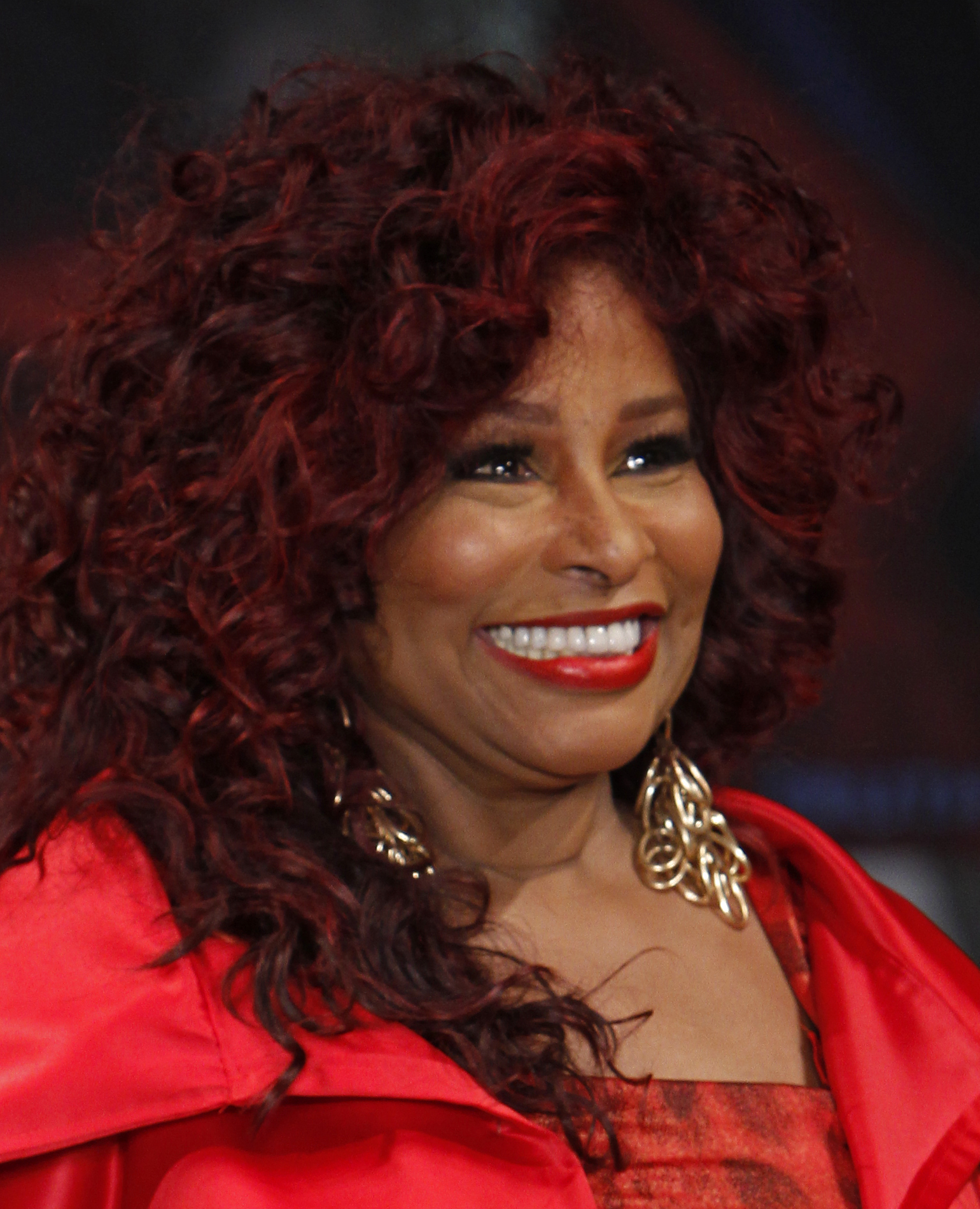
Chaka Khan (pictured) is a guest judge.

The episode originally aired on April 17, 2020. Stephen Daw of Billboard said the contestants "did their best Gwyneth Paltrow impressions to present their very own wellness products" during the main challenge.

On social media, season contestants Aiden Zhane, Brita, Dahlia Sin, Nicky Doll, and Rock M. Sakura shared images of the outfits they would have worn for the runway had they been in the competition for the episode.

== Reception ==
Kate Kulzick of The A.V. Club gave the episode a rating of 'A-'.

Sam Damshenas of Gay Times said of the lip-sync contest: "Jan pulled out every trick in the book – kicks, flips and splits, the whole shebang – but Widow’s passionate and controlled performance bought her another week in the competition." Damshenas said Jan's elimination "caused uproar on social media". Mikelle Street included Widow Von'Du's performance in "This Is My Night" in Out magazine's 2020 list of nine of the show's lip-syncs "that prove you don't need stunts and reveals". Street wrote, "In what's seemingly a combination of all of the great, non-stunt lip syncs before it, Widow Von Du turned it out to Chaka Khan, in front of Chaka Khan. The fact that this was clear to all that skipping the flips and splits was a choice given that she did all of those and more during her lip sync in the first episode, only made it all the more impressive." Heidi N Closet said the lip-sync was among her top four favorites of the season. She said, "That was such a good lip sync! Oh my goodness, all the girls were like, ‘if they do a double save this year, this might be it.’ Jan gave it her all with that lip sync and Widow was possessed by Chaka Khan herself serving up the song. These lyrics are flowing out of her body right now! It was such a nail-biter in person."
