= Choices 2020 =

- RuPaul's Drag Race episode
- Episode no.: Season 12; Episode 9
- Presented by: RuPaul
- Original air date: April 24, 2020

Guest appearances
- Rachel Bloom (guest judge); Jeff Goldblum (guest judge); Raven

Episode chronology
← Previous "Droop"	Next → "Superfan Makeover"

"Choices 2020" is the ninth episode of the twelfth season of the American television series RuPaul's Drag Race. It originally aired on April 24, 2020. The episode's main challenge tasks the contestants with speaking in a presidential debate. Rachel Bloom and Jeff Goldblum are guest judges. Former contestant Raven also makes a guest appearance. Jaida Essence Hall wins the main challenge. Widow Von'Du is eliminated from the competition after placing in the bottom and losing a lip-sync contest to "Firework" by Katy Perry.

== Episode ==
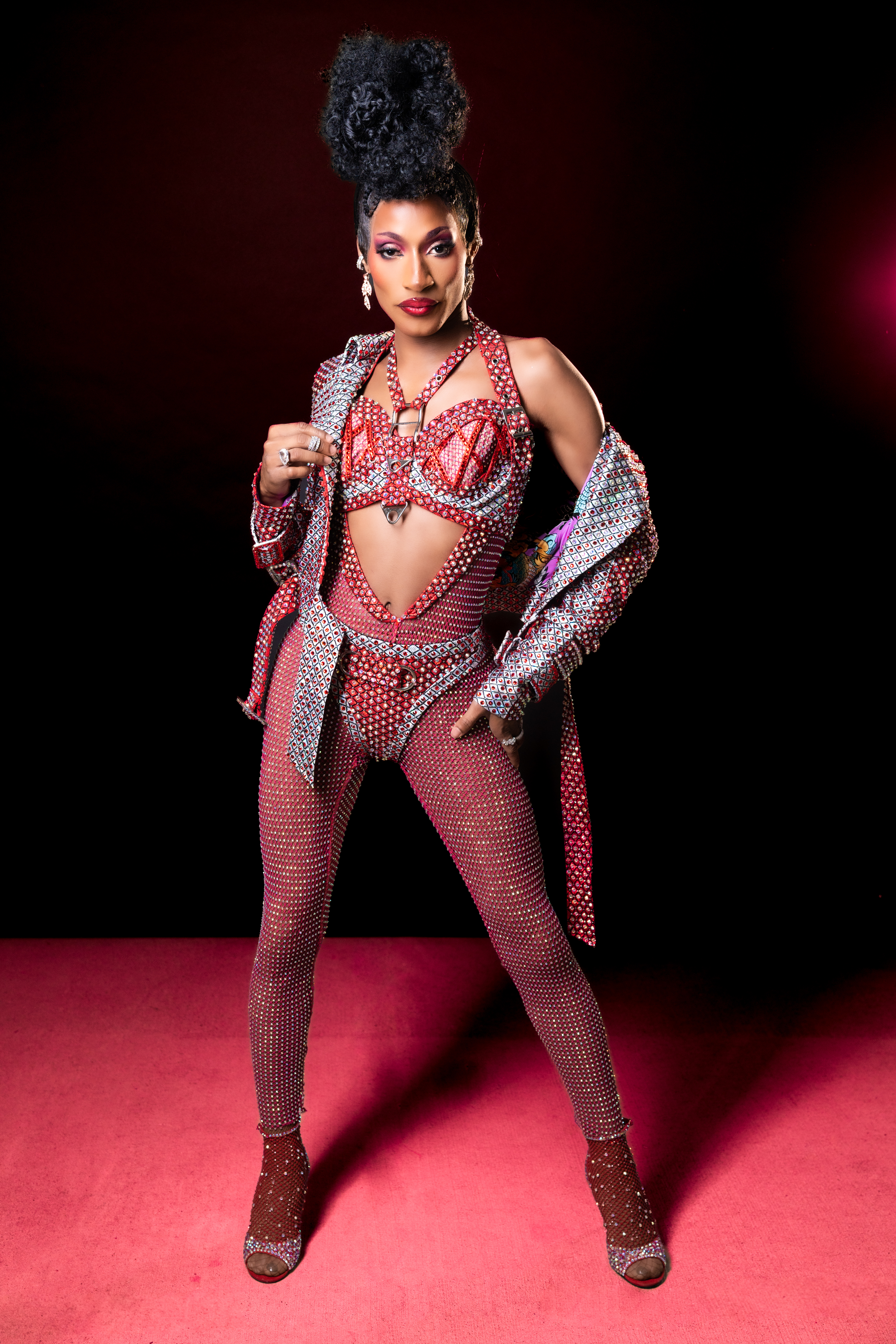
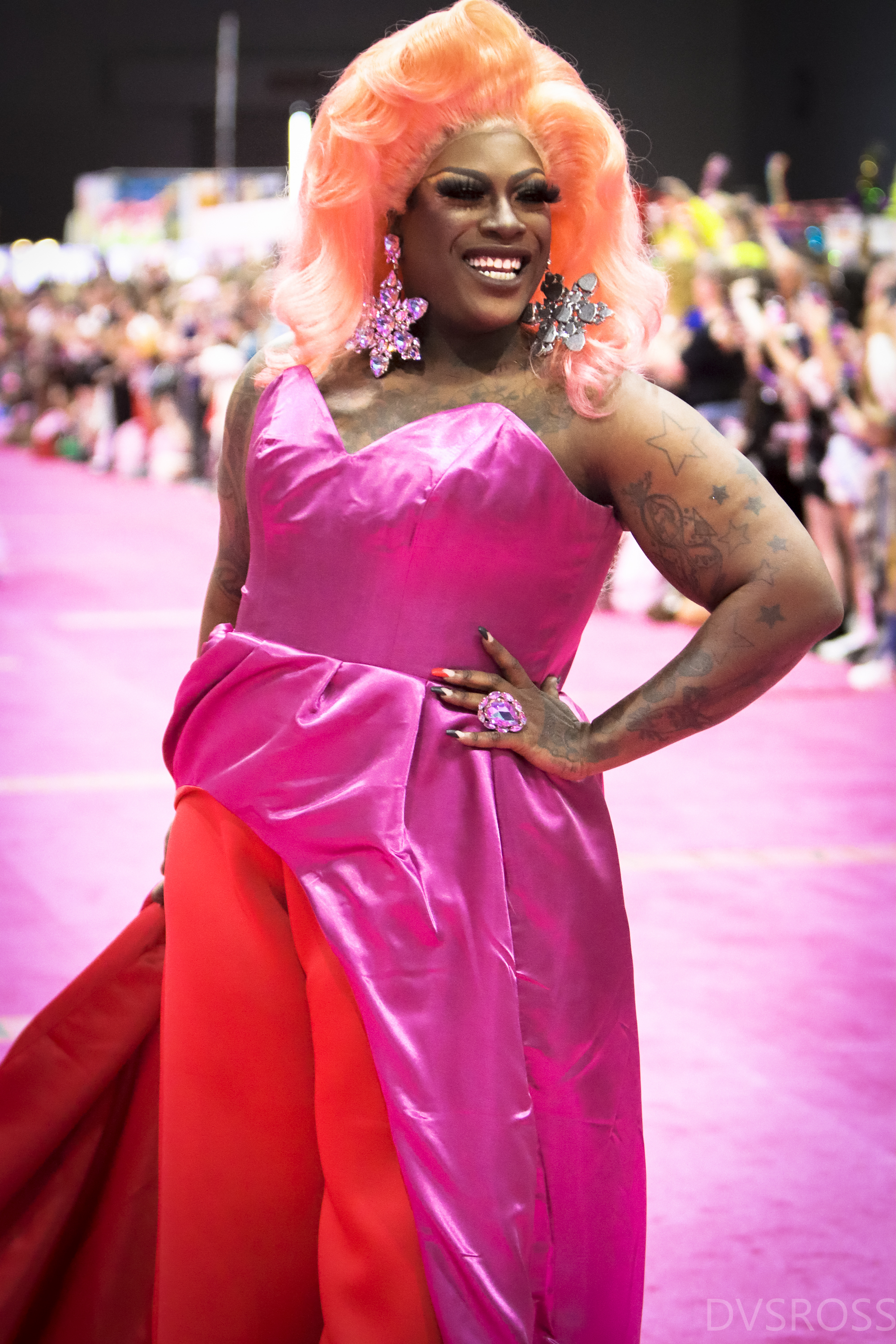
Jaida Essence Hall (left) wins the episode's main challenge; Widow Von'Du (right, pictured at RuPaul's DragCon LA in 2022) is eliminated from the competition.

The contestants return to the Werk Room after Jan's elimination on the previous episode. On a new day, RuPaul greets the group and introduces the Cats-inspired mini-challenge, which tasks the contestants with competing for the title of Kitty Girl 2020. Jackie Cox wins the mini-challenge. RuPaul then reveals the main challenge, which tasks the contestants with speaking in a political debate as part of a campaign to be the nation's first drag queen president. The contestants start to brainstorm. RuPaul returns to the Werk Room with former competitor Raven; the two meet with the contestants individually to ask questions and offer advice.

On elimination day, the contestants make final preparations in the Werk Room for the debate. The group discuss politics. Crystal Methyd, Jackie Cox, and Widow Von'Du talk about how the election of Donald Trump has impacted their life and family relationships. On the main stage, RuPaul welcomes fellow judges Michelle Visage and Carson Kressley, as well as guest judges Rachel Bloom and Jeff Goldblum. The debate commences with Bloom and Goldblum as moderators. RuPaul shares the runway category ("Stars and Stripes Forever"), then the fashion show commences. After the contestants present their looks, the judges deliver their critiques, deliberate, then share the results with the group. Jaida Essence Hall is declared the winner. Jackie Cox and Widow Von'Du place in the bottom and face off a lip-sync contest to "Firework" (2010) by Katy Perry. Jackie Cox wins the lip-sync and Widow Von'Du is eliminated from the competition.

== Production and broadcast ==
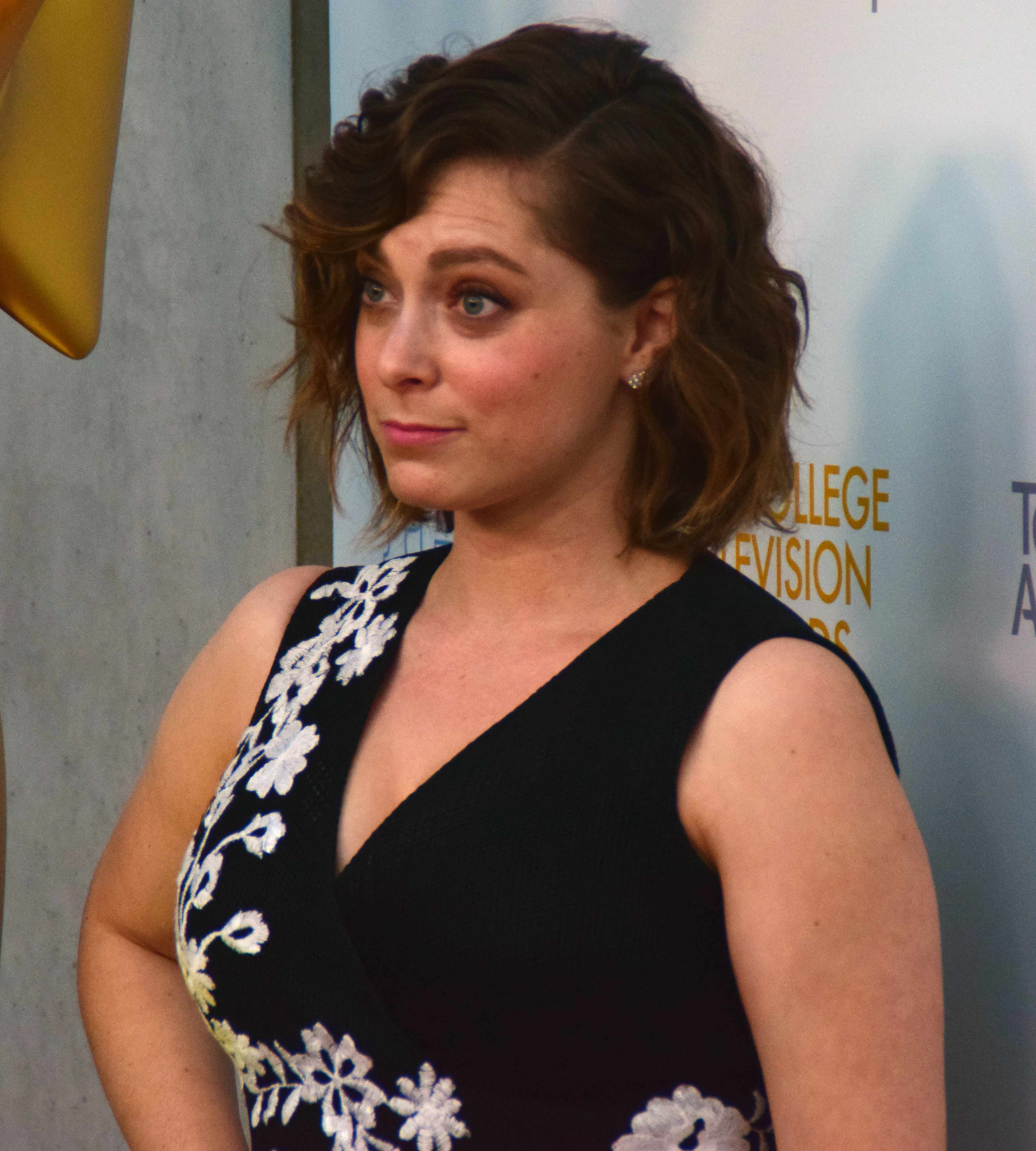
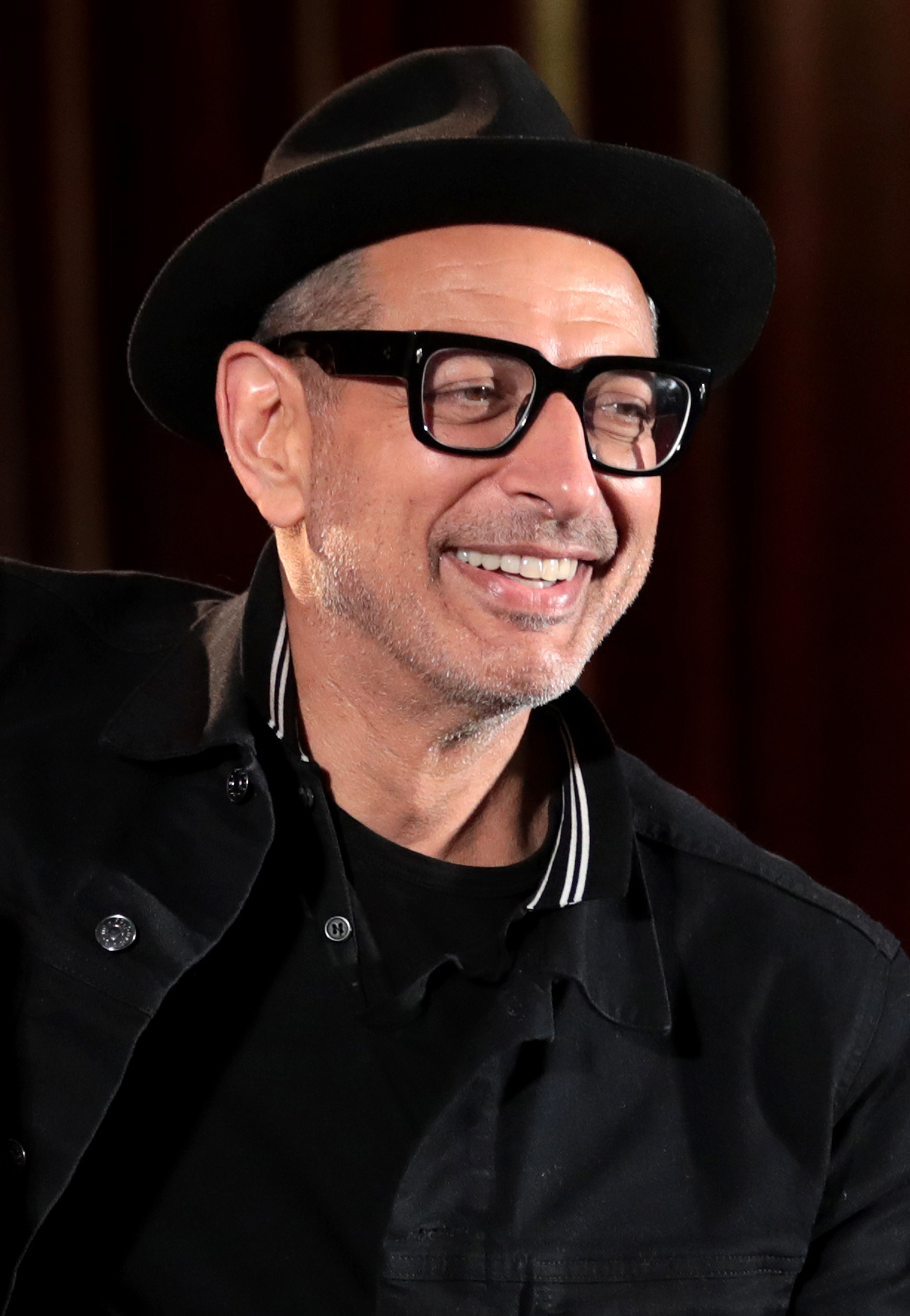
Rachel Bloom (top) and Jeff Goldblum (bottom) are guest judges.

The episode originally aired on April 24, 2020.

For the challenge, Jaida Essence Hall's campaign focused on being confused. She yells "Look over there!" during the debate.

According to The Hollywood Reporter, Goldblum "[came] under fire on social media for asking if Islam was 'anti-homosexuality' and anti-woman'" on the episode. His comment reportedly sparked a debate among viewers.

=== Fashion ===
Crystal Methyd wears as short blue skirt and a red jacket with a matching hat. Her wig is blue. Heidi N Closet has a sequined blue-and-white outfit, tall red boots, and a red wig. Inspired by the Black Panther Party, Widow Von'Du wears a black-out-white outfit with stars attached. She has large earrings and an afro. Sherry Pie has tall white boots and a tall wig. Jackie Cox wears a red-and-white striped kaftan and a hijab based on the American flag. Gigi Goode has a red coat, tall black boots, and a white wig. Jaida Essence Hall has a superhero-inspired outfit with stars.

== Reception ==
Kate Kulzick of The A.V. Club gave the episode a rating of 'B+'. Paul McCallion of Vulture rated the episode two out of five stars.

Jom Elauria included "Look over there!" in Screen Rant's 2022 list of the ten best quotes by Jaide Essence Hall. Bernardo Sim of Pride.com selected the "Firework" performance for the twelfth season in a 2023 list of the best lip-sync contests of each season, writing: "Jackie Cox lip syncing to 'Firework' ... while in full burqa drag was an incredibly emotional moment not only for season 12, but also in Drag Race herstory. Widow Von’Du was a lip sync assassin throughout that entire season, but Cox really had the edge in this performance for what this moment meant on a cultural level within this queer series."

== See also ==
- LGBTQ people and Islam
- Sexuality in Islam
- Women in Islam
