= Superfan Makeover =

- RuPaul's Drag Race episode
- Episode no.: Season 12; Episode 10
- Presented by: RuPaul
- Original air date: May 1, 2020

Guest appearance
- Daisy Ridley

Episode chronology
← Previous "Choices 2020"	Next → "One-Queen Show"

"Superfan Makeover" is the tenth episode of the twelfth season of the American television series RuPaul's Drag Race. It originally aired on May 1, 2020. The episode's main challenge tasks contestants with giving makeovers to "superfans" of the show. Daisy Ridley is a guest judge. Jaida Essence Hall wins the challenge. Heidi N Closet and Jackie Cox place in the bottom two and face off in a lip-sync contest to "Kill the Lights" by Alex Newell, but neither is eliminated from the competition.

== Episode ==
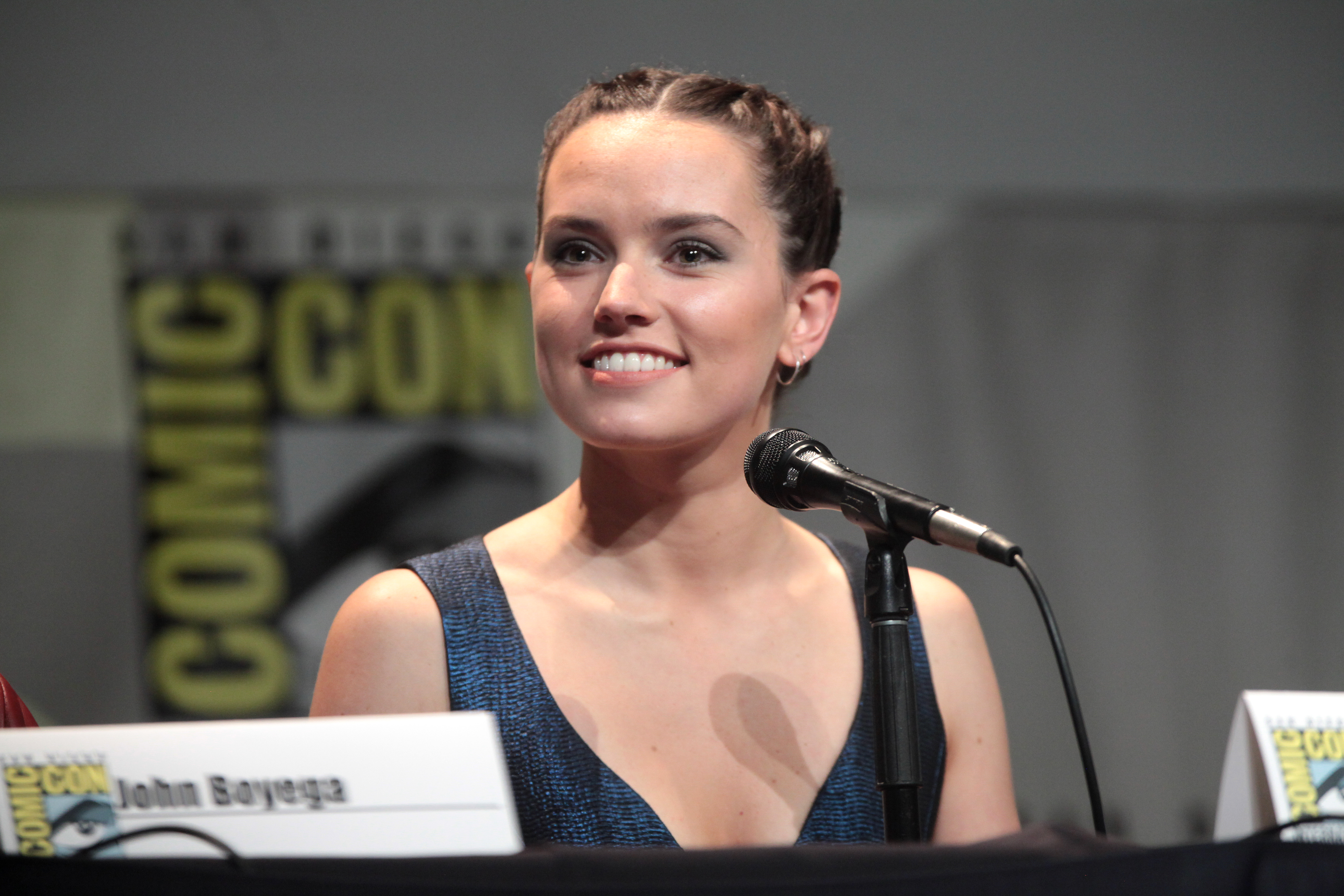
Daisy Ridley (pictured in 2015) is a guest judge on the episode.

For the main challenge, the contestants are tasked with giving makeovers to cisgender (or AFAB) women "superfans" of Drag Race. The teams are paired by Jaida Essence Hall, who won the previous challenge. She choose Bethany for herself, and pairs Grace with Crystal Methyd, Janet the Planet with Sherry Pie, Nicole with Heidi N Closet, Shea with Gigi Goode, and Tiffany with Jackie Cox.

The runway category is "Drag Family Resemblance". In addition to RuPaul, the judges are Michelle Visage, Ross Matthews, and Daisy Ridley. Jaida Essence Hall wins the challenge. Crystal, Gigi, and Sherry are deemed safe, placing Heidi N Closet and Jackie Cox in the bottom. Heidi N Closet and Jackie Cox face off in a lip-sync contest to Alex Newell's “Kill the Lights" (2016), but neither contestant is eliminated from the competition.

== Production and broadcast ==
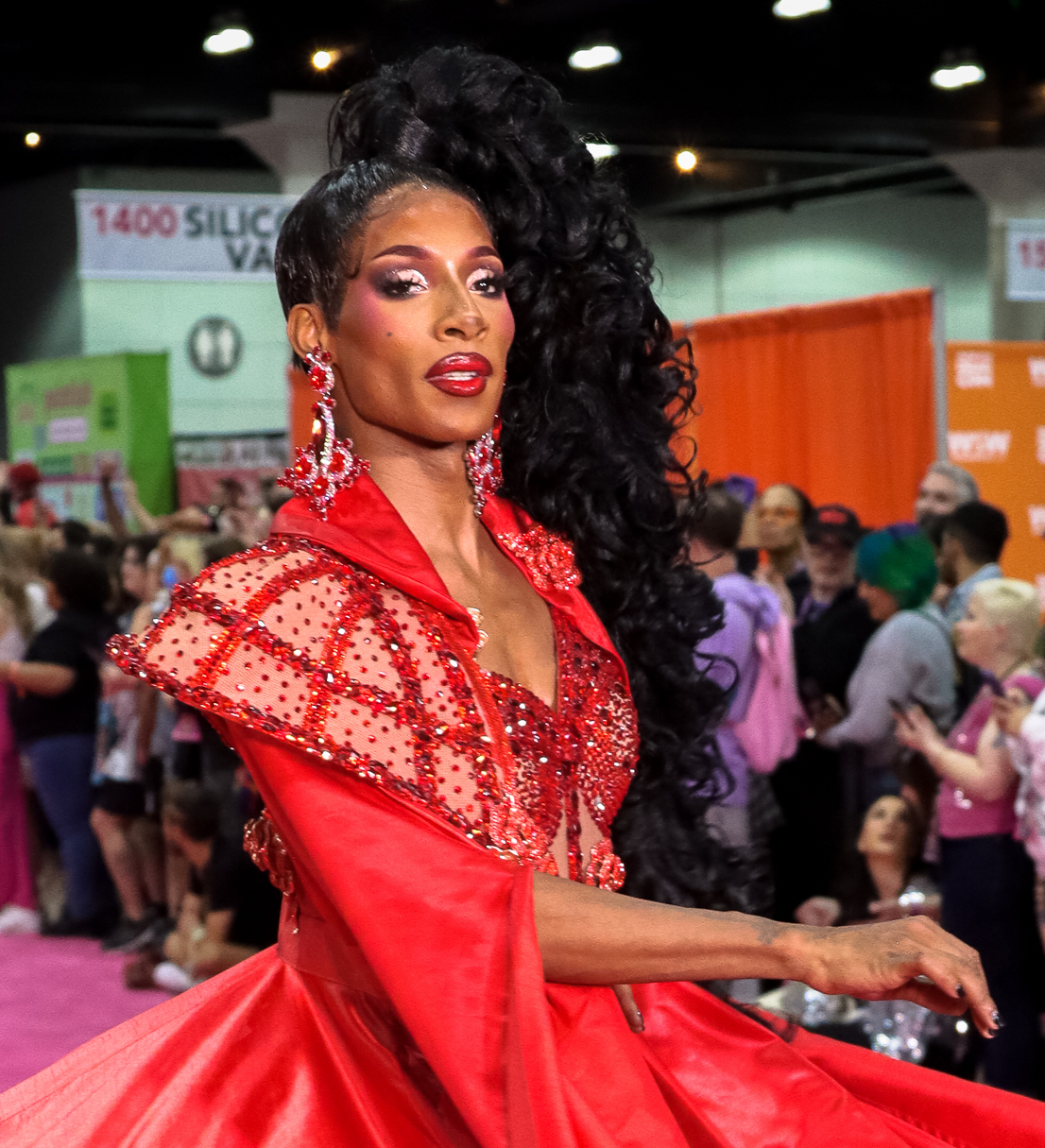
Jaida Essence Hall (pictured at RuPaul's DragCon LA in 2023) wins the episode's main challenge.

The episode originally aired on May 1, 2020.

=== Fashion ===
Crystal and Grace wear looks inspired by Bert and Ernie.

Dahlia Sin shared her planned look for the challenge on social media.

== Reception ==
The A.V. Club's Kate Kulzick gave the episode a rating of 'B+'.

Jared Richards of Junkee wrote, "The more I think about it, the more silly it seems that Crystal didn't win. Her runway look was so clever: it gender-flips two 'not gay' Sesame Street characters, makes them the sickest lesbians out with garish fashion, and is the exact kind of risk that no-one else did this challenge." Marcus Wratten of PinkNews said Crystal Methyd's look was the best of the season.

Jessica Jalali included Jaida Essence Hall's work in Screen Rant's 2021 list of the ten best makeover challenge "transformations" on the show, and wrote, "Jaida transformed their superfan into a glamazon. Even though the pair looked nothing alike, Jaida managed to pull off a drag family resemblance. Jaida's makeover of the superfan impressed the judges immensely and for good reason as both looked flawless and the superfan confessed to feeling strong and beautiful because of Jaida's makeover skills." The website's Amii Johnson included the episode in a 2021 list of the ten best episodes, according to IMDb. Johnson wrote, "With its fun and exciting main challenge ... it's easy to see why this episode is a fan favorite. A standout among the cast in this episode was Crystal Methyd, who almost won the challenge with her inspired Bert & Ernie makeover look."
