= One-Queen Show =

- RuPaul's Drag Race episode
- Episode no.: Season 12; Episode 11
- Presented by: RuPaul
- Original air date: May 8, 2020

Guest appearance
- Whoopi Goldberg

Episode chronology
← Previous "Superfan Makeover"	Next → "Viva Drag Vegas"

"One-Queen Show" is the eleventh episode of the twelfth season of the American television series RuPaul's Drag Race. It originally aired on May 8, 2020. The episode's main challenge tasks the contestants with performing in original one-woman shows. Whoopi Goldberg is a guest judge. Crystal Methyd wins the main challenge. Heidi N Closet is eliminated from the competition after placing in the bottom and losing a lip-sync contest against Jaida Essence Hall to "1999" (1982) by Prince.

== Episode ==
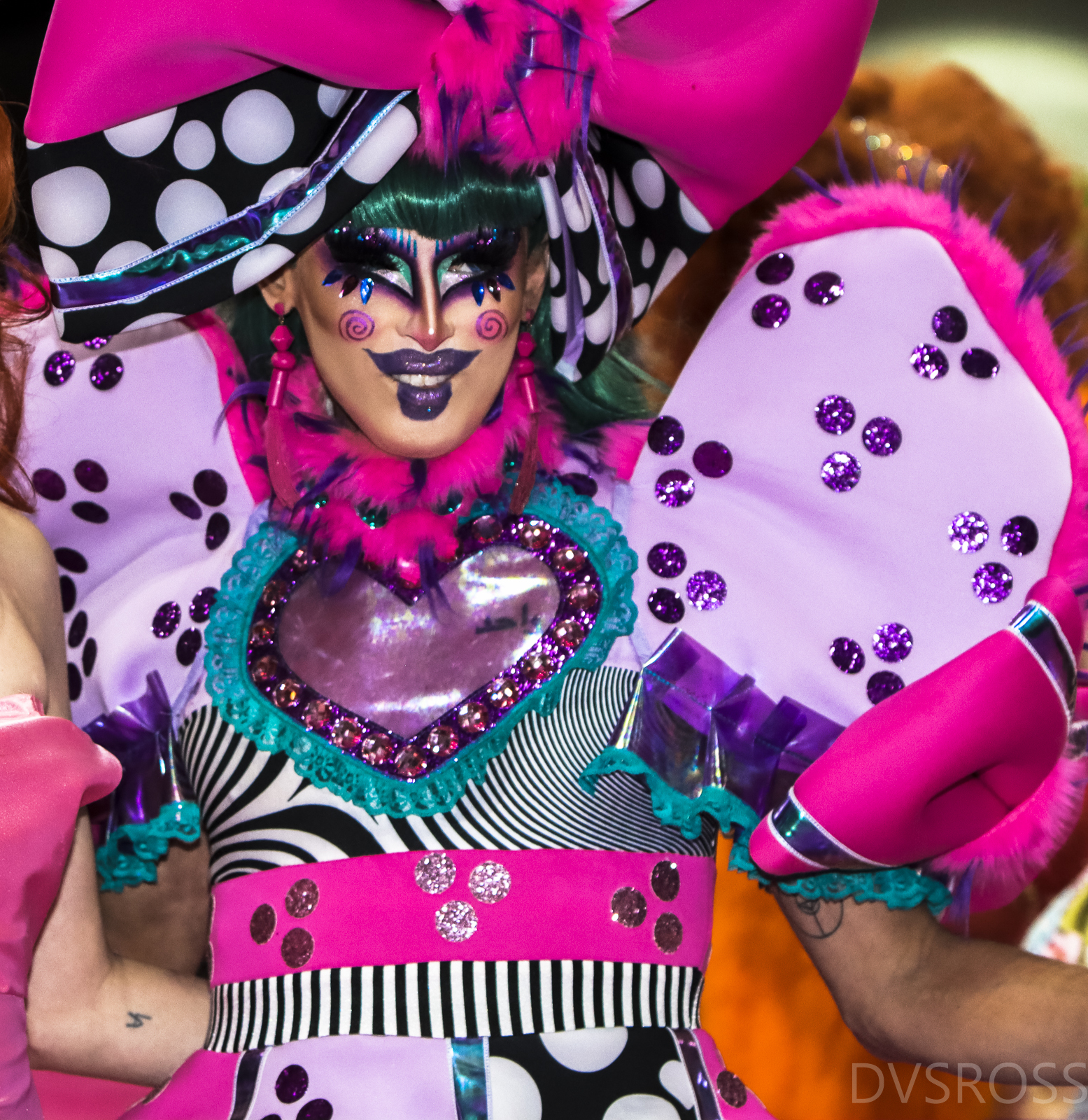
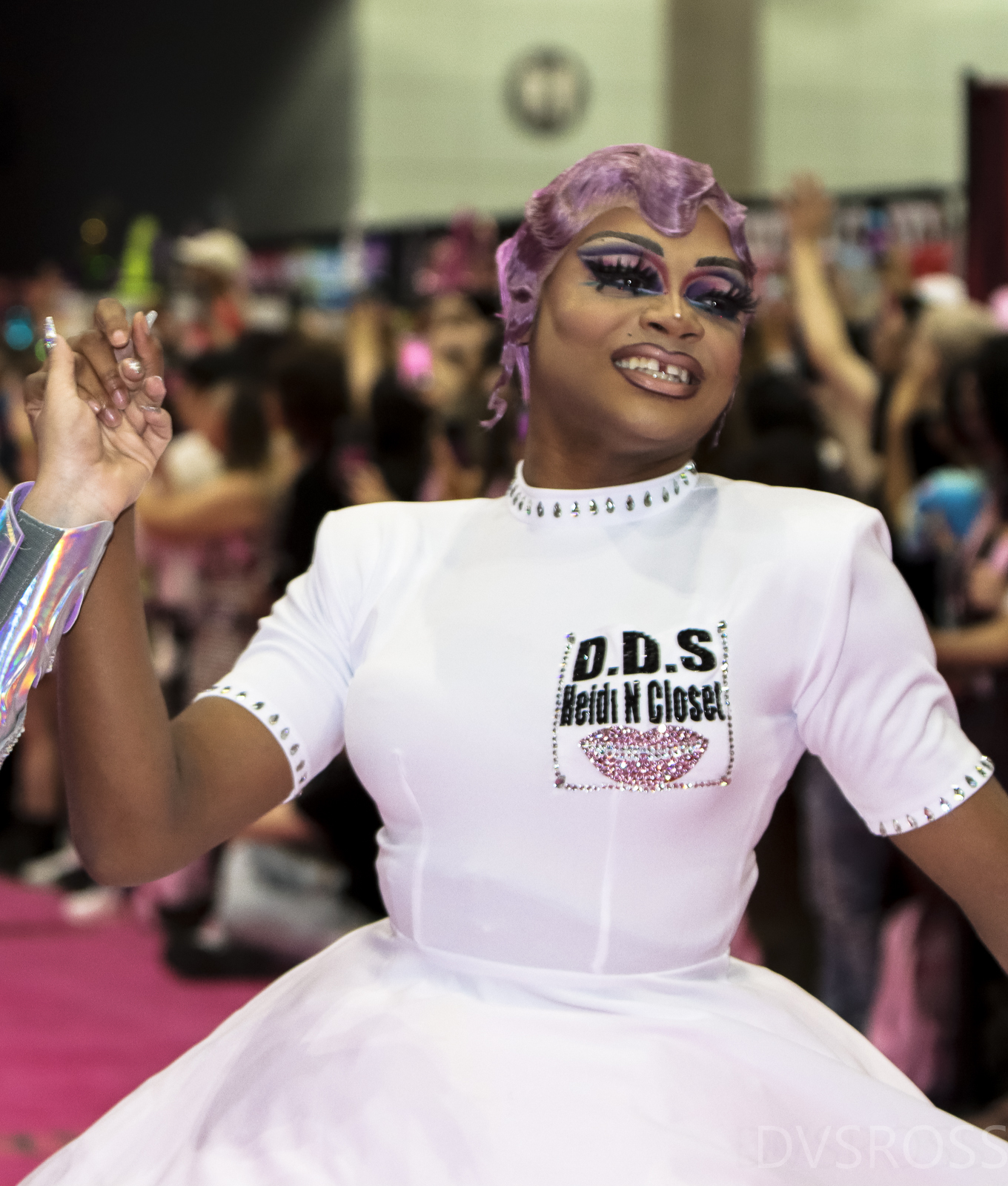
Crystal Methyd (top, pictured at RuPaul's DragCon LA in 2022) wins the episode's main challenge and Heidi N Closet (bottom, pictured at the same event) is eliminated from the competition.

The contestants return to the Werk Room after no one was eliminated on the previous episode. On a new day, RuPaul greets the group and reveals the mini-challenge, which tasks the contestants with participating in a puppet show, during which they roast (or playfully insult) each other. The contestants have 20 minutes to dress up the puppets in drag. Crystal Methyd has a puppet of Jaida Essence Hall, who has a puppet of Gigi Goode. Sherry Pie has a puppet of Heidi N Closet. Jackie Cox has a puppet of Sherry Pie and Gigi Goode has a puppet of Jackie Cox. Heidi N Closet has a puppet of Crystal Methyd. Jackie Cox wins the mini-challenge.

RuPaul then reveals the main challenge, which tasks the contestants with creating and performing in original one-woman shows. As the winner of the mini-challenge, Jackie Cox determines the show order. Before leaving, RuPaul reveals that Whoopi Goldberg is the guest judge. The contestants share their preferences for the order, then Jackie Cox makes her decision.

One at a time, the contestants rehearse on the main stage with RuPaul and Goldberg. On elimination day, the contestants make final preparations in the Werk Room for the one-woman and fashion shows. Jackie Cox talks about her relationship with her parents. On the main stage, RuPaul welcomes fellow judges Michelle Visage and Ross Mathews, as well as guest judge Goldberg. RuPaul shares the assignment and runway category ("The Color Purple"), then the contestants perform their original shows. Following are the acts:

- Jackie Cox – Between Two Parents
- Crystal Methyd – Phenomenal Phil: Exotic Dance Instructor
- Heidi N Closet – Cookout with Your Cheeks Out
- Gigi Goode – Welcome Aboard Brimstone Airways
- Sherry Pie – Bubbles and Sherry
- Jaida Essence Hall – The "P" in Pageant

After the contestants present their looks in the fashion show, the judges deliver their critiques, deliberate, then share the results with the group. Crystal Methyd and Jackie Cox receive positive critiques, and Crystal Methyd wins the challenge. Heidi N Closet, Jaida Essence Hall, and Sherry Pie receive negative critiques, and Sherry Pie is deemed safe. Heidi N Closet and Jaida Essence Hall place in the bottom and face off in a lip-sync contest to "1999" (1982) by Prince. Jaida Essence Hall wins the lip-sync and Heidi N Closet is eliminated from the competition.

== Production and broadcast ==
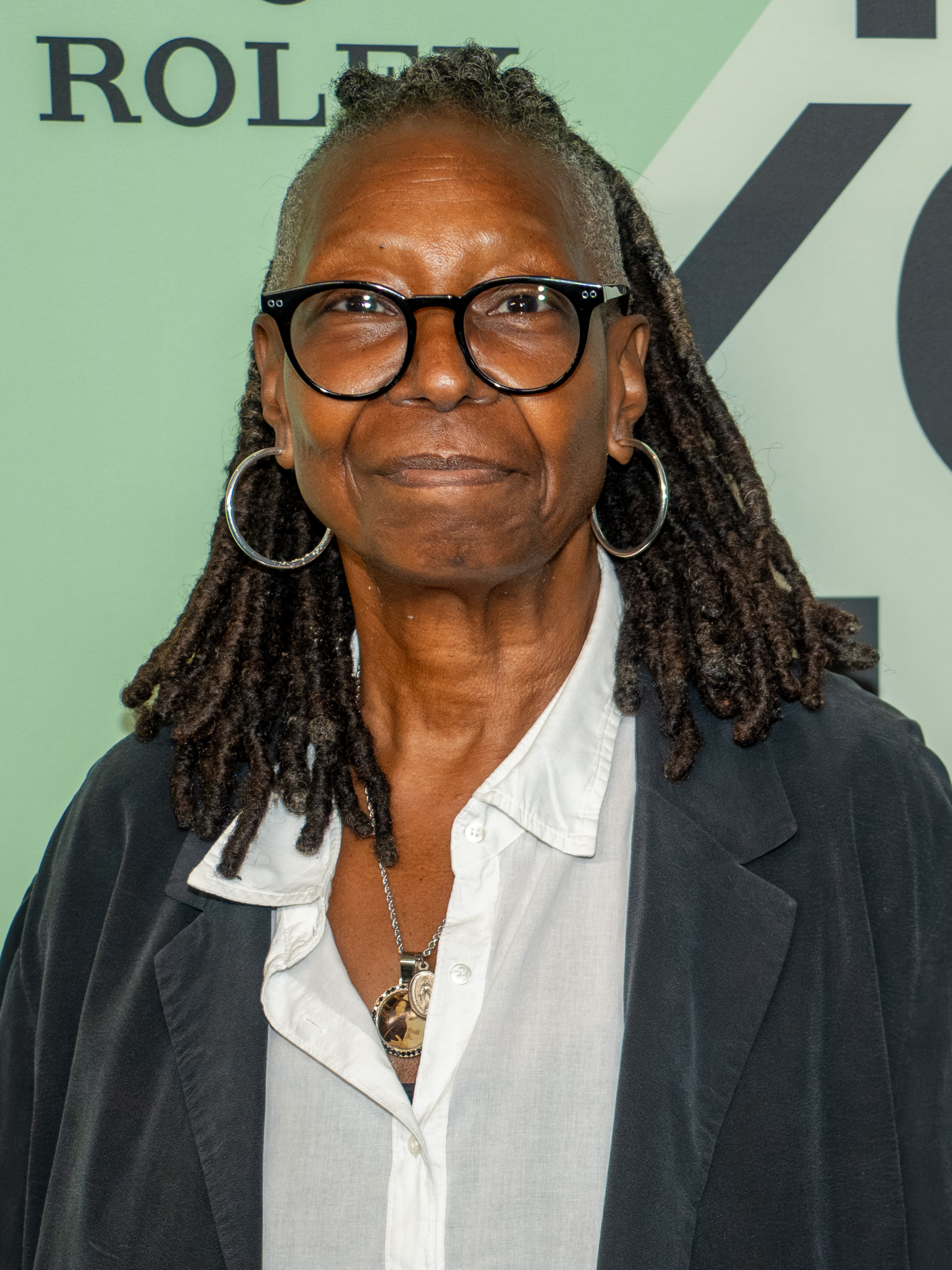
Whoopi Goldberg (pictured in 2025) is a guest judge.

The episode originally aired on May 8, 2020.

During rehearsals, Jaidi Essence Hall gets emotional meeting Goldberg.

The website Jezebel described Crystal Methyd's character Phenomenal Phil as a 1980s exotic dance instructor. Stephen Daw of Billboard called Crystal Methyd's dance moves "over-the-top". Heidi N Closet portrays four characters at a family cookout in her show.

=== Fashion ===
For the fashion show, the contestants wear purple outfits. Jackie Cox's outfit is inspired by the Purple People Eater. Her outfit has a large eye and a tongue with a tablet of MDMA. She has a yellow wig. Crystal Methyd's look is inspired by Nick Cave and soundsuits. She has horns on her head. Heidi N Closet has a gown with lace and a brown wig. Gigi Goode has a Scooby-Doo-inspired green-and-purple outfit with a red wig. Sherry Pie's outfit is inspired by the Cheshire Cat. Jaida Essence Hall's dress matches her boots and hat. She has a long brown wig.

== Reception ==
Kate Kulzick of The A.V. Club gave the episode a rating of 'B'. Alex Bollinger included the episode in INTO Magazine's 2021 list of the show's top five challenges "that blew our minds and then never came back". Bollinger wrote, "Drag Race has had so many performance challenges, but none have had as little structure – and allowed for as much creativity – as this one." Stephen Daw included the "1999" performance in Billboard's 2024 list of the best lip-sync contests from each season of the show.

== See also ==
- Whoopi Goldberg on screen and stage
