= Viva Drag Vegas =

- RuPaul's Drag Race episode
- Episode no.: Season 12; Episode 12
- Presented by: RuPaul
- Original air date: May 15, 2020

Guest appearances
- Jamal Sims (guest judge); Leland

Episode chronology
← Previous "One-Queen Show"	Next → "Alone Together"

"Viva Drag Vegas" is the twelfth episode of the twelfth season of the American television series RuPaul's Drag Race. It originally aired on May 15, 2020. The episode's main challenge tasks the contestants with performing a medley of original songs from the Las Vegas show RuPaul's Drag Race Live! The challenge requires contestants to lip-sync, record original rap verses with Leland, and learn choreography from guest judge Jamal Sims. Gigi Goode wins the main challenge. Jackie Cox is eliminated from the competition after placing in the bottom and losing a lip-sync contest against Crystal Methyd to "On the Floor" by Jennifer Lopez.

== Episode ==
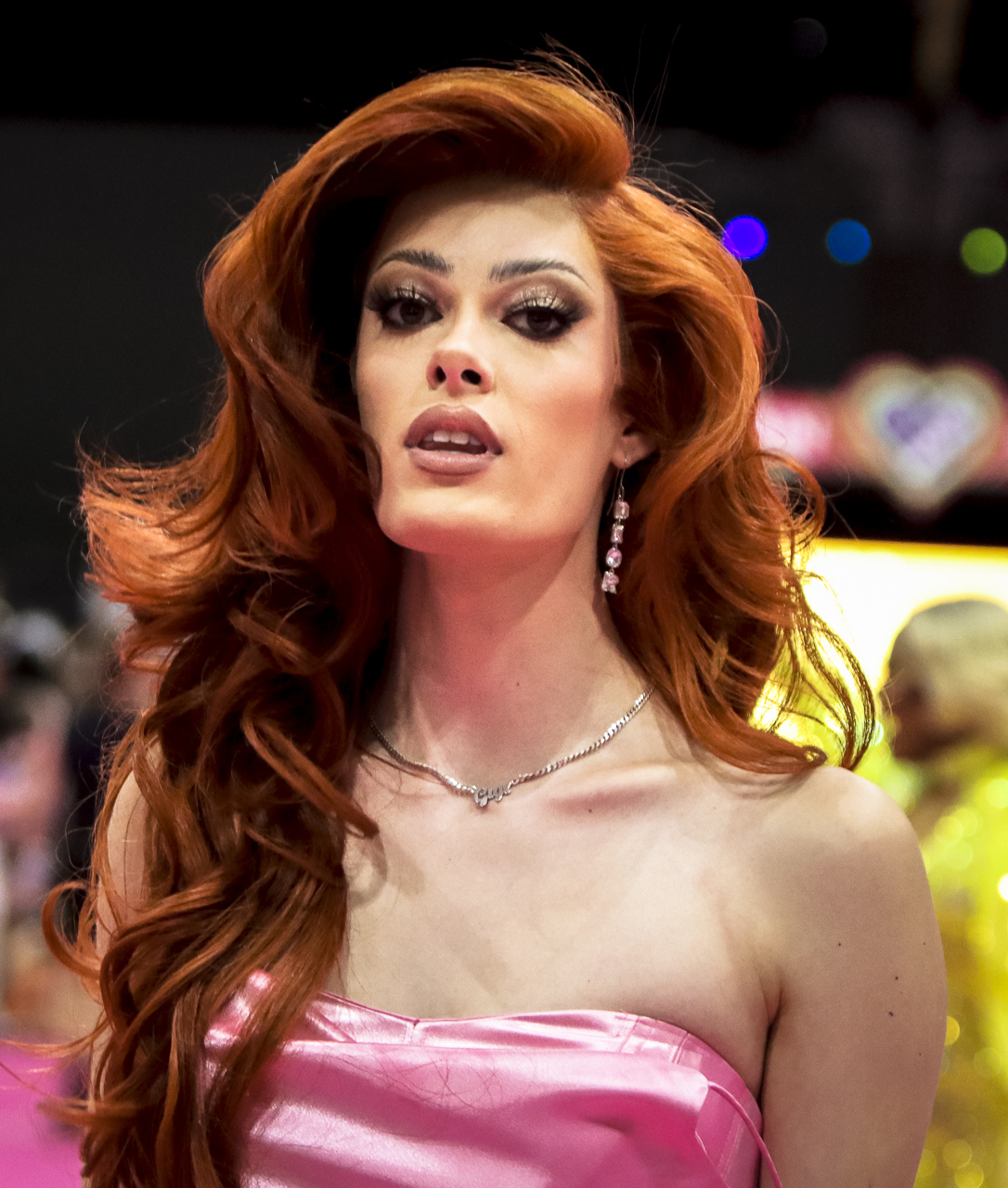
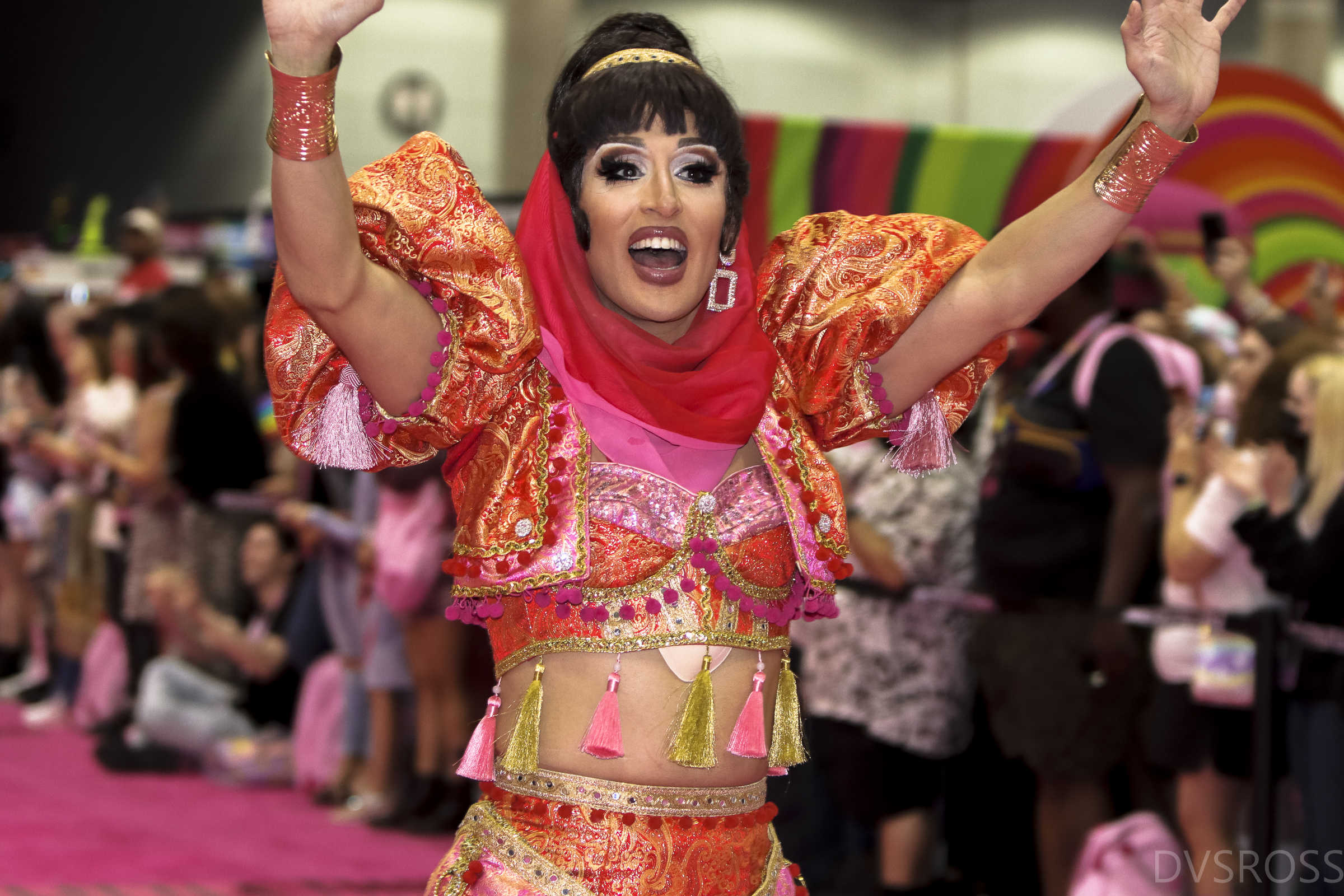
Gigi Goode (top, pictured at RuPaul's DragCon LA in 2022) wins the episode's main challenge; Jackie Cox (bottom, pictured at the same event) is eliminated from the competition.

The final five contestants return to the Werk Room after Heidi N Closet's elimination on the previous episode, then relocate to the Untucked Lounge when the Werk Room experiences a temporary power outage. On a new day, RuPaul greets the group and reveals the mini-challenge, which tasks the contestants with getting into "quick drag" and designing headdresses. Gigi Goode wins the mini-challenge. RuPaul then reveals the main challenge, which tasks the contestants with performing a medley of original songs from the Las Vegas show RuPaul's Drag Race Live!, including "We Made It", "Mirror Song", and "Losing Is the New Winning". For the latter song, the contestants must contribute original rap verses. RuPaul shares that the contestants will record vocals with Leland and rehearse choreography with Jamal Sims. The contestants start to brainstorm in the Werk Room, then record with Leland and audio engineer Freddy Scott. The contestants rehearse with Sims on the main stage.

On elimination day, the contestants make final preparations in the Werk Room for the main challenge and fashion show. The contestants talk about their first impressions of each other and the progress made during the season. On the main stage, RuPaul welcomes fellow judges Michelle Visage, Carson Kressley, and Ross Matthews, as well as guest judge Sims. RuPaul reveals the runway category ("Eleganza Extravaganza", or elegant drag), then the contestants perform the Rusical (musical theatre production) and present their looks in the fashion show. The judges deliver their critiques, deliberate, and share the results with the group. Gigi Goode is declared the winner of the main challenge. Crystal Methyd and Jackie Cox place in the bottom and face off in a lip-sync contest to "On the Floor" (2011) by Jennifer Lopez. Crystal Methyd wins the lip-sync and Jackie Cox is eliminated from the competition. Crystal Methyd, Gigi Goode, and Jaida Essence Hall are declared the season's finalists.

== Production and broadcast ==
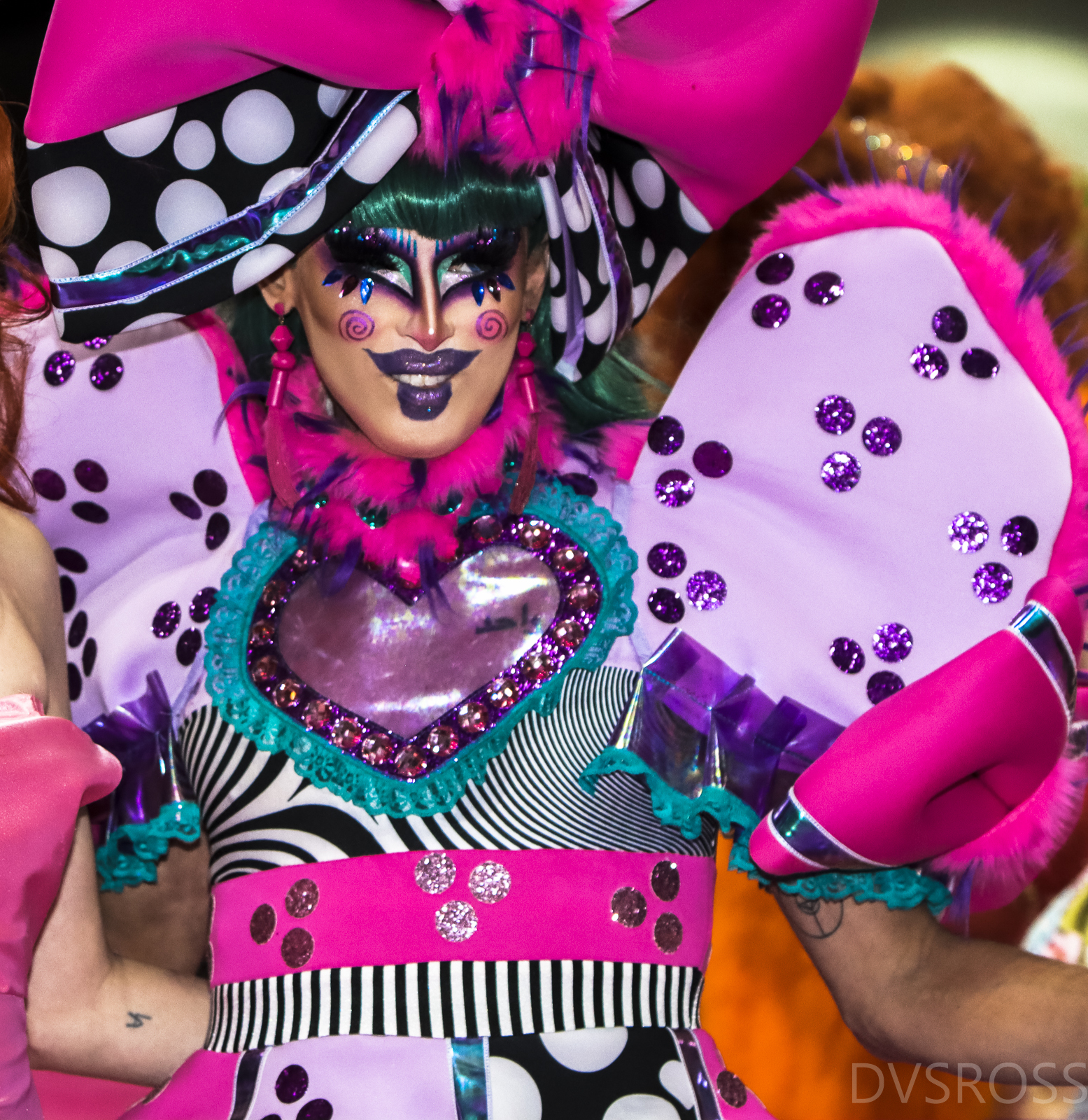
Crystal Methyd (pictured at RuPaul's DragCon LA in 2022) wins the episode's lip-sync contest.

The episode originally aired on May 15, 2020.

Hotspots Magazine described the three songs as "a big opening number, a heartfelt first act closer and the spectacular disco finale". Matt Moore of Gay Times said of the lip-sync contest: "Crystal brought back all the moves from Phenomenal Phil, including the 'Dump' and the 'Kitty Litter' while Jackie seemed to reprise her character from the Kill the Lights lip-sync. It was incredibly close, but Ru ultimately chose to save Crystal."

=== Fashion ===
For the mini-challenge, Jada Essence Hall's outfit is orange and purple. Gigi Goode's gold outfit has light blue feathers. Sherry Pie has a black outfit and a pink headdress. Crystal Methyd's outfit is pink. Jackie Cox has gold shorts and a white boa. For the fashion show, Crystal Methyd wears a blue outfit with gloves and a head wrap. Gigi Goode wears a light blue 1980s-inspired prom dress with ruffles, as well as a bow tie, headgear, and a red wig. Jackie Cox wears a Christian Dior- and Andy Warhol-inspired dress with polka dots and a blue wig. Sherry Pie has a Mae West-inspired blue gown with feathers a matching hat. She has an umbrella and a blonde wig. Jaida Essence Hall has a gold dress and a dark wig.

Heidi N Closet revealed the look she planned for the episode on social media.

== Reception ==
Kate Kulzick of The A.V. Club gave "Viva Drag Vegas" a rating of 'A'. Paul McCallion of Vulture rated the episode three out of five stars. Kevin O'Keeffe of Xtra Magazine opined, "Through no fault of its own, this episode of RuPaul's Drag Race is a bit of a downer." Chris Malone of Billboard described the main challenge as "one of the stiffest competitions to date". Claire Valentine McCartney of Nylon said the lip-sync contest was "spirited". Joey Nolfi of Entertainment Weekly ranked the runway presentations by Gigi Goode, Jackie Cox, Jaida Essence Hall, and Crystal Methyd numbers 33, 32, 14, and 3, respectively, in a list of all looks from the season.
