= Brita Filter =

American drag queen (born 1985)

- Born: Jesse Carl Havea; September 16, 1985 (age 41); U.S.
- Occupation: Drag queen
- Television: Shade: Queens of NYC; RuPaul's Drag Race (season 12) 9th place
- Website: thebritafilter.com

Brita Filter, the stage name of Jesse Carl Havea, is an American drag queen who has appeared on Shade: Queens of NYC and the twelfth season of RuPaul's Drag Race, ultimately placing 9th.

== Early life and career ==
Havea moved to Dover-Foxcroft, Maine as a child. He is of Tongan descent. Havea was born and raised Mormon.

Havea grew up as a child performer, went on to book national tours with theater companies, and eventually studied acting at the American Musical and Dramatic Academy. He later became a stage actor and performed in various regional and national productions. He landed the role of a stepsister in the musical production of Cinderella. On the last night of his tenure with this production, Havea met a girl named "Brita" and decided to make "Brita Filter" his stage name that night. He then returned to Manhattan and started his business performing as Brita Filter, a drag queen, stating, "So after that finished, I came back to New York that day, and I decided I was going to take over New York!"

In 2016, Havea won the 2016 Glam Awards for Best Duo alongside fellow drag artist Terra Hyman. In 2018, she won the Best Host and the NYC Entertainer of the Year Award at the Annual Glam Awards. In 2020, Havea co-hosted the 21st annual GLAM Awards, alongside Bob the Drag Queen.

Havea performed alongside Katy Perry on Saturday Night Live, performing her song "Swish Swish".

Havea starred in a segment called "How Drag Queens Are Getting Out the Vote" on The Daily Show with Trevor Noah, along with RuPaul's Drag Race Season 12 co-stars Jaida Essence Hall, Heidi N. Closet and Jackie Cox.

Havea is a co-chair of Drag Out the Vote, a nonpartisan nonprofit that works with drag performers to promote participation in democracy.

Havea joined the cast of Shade: Queens of NYC at its inception in October 2017, as Brita Filter. The series documents the daily reality of lives as Manhattan drag queens.

On January 23, 2020, Havea was announced as one of the thirteen contestants on the twelfth season of RuPaul's Drag Race, becoming the first Pasifika queen to appear on the show. To protect copyright, his stage name on the show is shortened from "Brita Filter" to simply "Brita". In the fourth episode, "The Ball Ball", Havea lipsynced for her life against Rock M Sakura, sending them home to "S&M" by Rihanna. She later found herself again in the bottom two in episode six, where she lipsynced for her life against Aiden Zhane, to "Let It Go" by Caissie Levy; Brita also sent Aiden home. She was in the bottom two again on episode seven, in which she lipsynced for her life against Heidi N. Closet, to "Burning Up" by Madonna. Havea lost the lipsync and went home.

Brita placed 9th overall in the competition.

== Personal life ==
Havea is pansexual and prefers "anything respectful" as pronouns.

== Filmography ==
=== Film ===
Year	Title	Role	Notes	Ref.
2010	The Sorcerer's Apprentice	Calcutta Peasant	Uncredited	

=== Television ===
Year	Title	Role	Notes
2012	City of Dreams	SVU Actor	Episode: "Pilot"
2017	Shade: Queens of NYC	Herself	Lead role
2017	Saturday Night Live	Herself	Background dancer
2019	Broad City	Herself	Guest
2020	RuPaul's Drag Race	Herself	Contestant (9th place)
2020	RuPaul's Drag Race: Untucked	Herself	Contestant (9th place)
2020	Kal Penn Approves This Message	Herself	Episode "Kal Penn Approves Education"
2020	The Daily Show with Trevor Noah	Herself	Episode 3457, August 21, 2020

=== Web series ===
Year	Title	Role	Notes	Ref
2017	Daniel's Desk	Himself	Episode 1	
2019	Cosmo Queens	Himself	Cosmopolitan Series	
2020	Drag News	Himself	Guest	
2020	The X Change Rate	Himself	Segment: Brita Unfiltered	
2020	Whatcha Packin	Himself	Guest	
2020	Review with a Jew	Himself	Guest	
2020	Da Fuq	Himself	Guest	
2020	Out of the Closet	Himself	Guest	
2020	Bring Back My Ghouls	Herself	Guest	
2022	Bring Back My Girls	Herself	Guest	

== Theatre ==
Year	Production	Role	Venue	Notes	Ref(s)
2014	Forever Plaid	Smudge	Fine Arts Center Theatre Company	Credited as Jesse Havea	
2014	Cinderella: A New Telling of an Old Tale	Stepsister	Penobscot Theatre Company	Credited as Jesse Havea	
2017	The Shards of an Honor Code Junkie	Starr Lyte	Metro Baptist Church	Credited as Jesse Havea & Brita Filter	
2021	Hard On Love	Steve	The Blank Theater (digital)	Credited as Jesse Havea	

== Discography ==
=== Featured singles ===
Title	Year	Album
"I'm That Bitch" (with The Cast of RuPaul's Drag Race Season 12)	2020	non-album single
"Madonna: The Unauthorized Rusical" (with The Cast of RuPaul's Drag Race Season 12)	2020	non-album single
"The Shady Bunch" (with The Cast of RuPaul's Drag Race Season 12)	2020	non-album single
"You Brita Vote, Kay? (with Bryce Quartz and KayKay Lavelle)	2020	non-album single

== See also ==
- LGBT culture in New York City
- List of LGBT people from New York City
