= Bring Back My Ghouls =

2020 Halloween variety special

- Promotional graphic
- Country of origin: United States

Production
- Production company: World of Wonder

Bring Back My Ghouls is a Halloween variety special presented by World of Wonder, which streamed on the company's YouTube channel and WOW Presents Plus subscription service on October 30, 2020.

The broadcast features the contestants of season 12 of RuPaul's Drag Race performing lip-syncs and participating in interviews. RuPaul also appears with a "special message". Viewers could submit requests and send tips via Cash App, PayPal, or Venmo, which were split evenly between the performers. Participants lip-synced to the songs "Bring Back My Ghouls" and "I'm That Witch" and wore Halloween-inspired costumes. Gigi Goode appeared as Tippi Hedren in Alfred Hitchcock's 1963 film The Birds, Rock M. Sakura dressed as a squid, and Widow Von'Du dressed as the Wicked Witch of the West, a fictional character in L. Frank Baum's children's novel The Wonderful Wizard of Oz (1900) and subsequent adaptations. Season 12 winner Jaida Essence Hall spoke with fellow contestants about their Halloween plans. There is also a Snatch Game rendition.

The "Time to Vote" segment was a collaboration with Crooked Media and Vote Save America and saw Brita Filter and Heidi N Closet emphasize the importance of voting in the 2020 United States elections in a parody of the music video for RuPaul's song "Peanut Butter".

== See also ==
- List of Halloween television specials
- Night of the Living Drag
