= Madonna: The Unauthorized Rusical =

- RuPaul's Drag Race episode
- Episode no.: Season 12; Episode 7
- Presented by: RuPaul
- Original air date: April 10, 2020

Guest appearances
- Winnie Harlow (guest judge); Alexandria Ocasio-Cortez (guest judge); Jamal Sims

Episode chronology
← Previous "Snatch Game"	Next → "Droop"

"Madonna: The Unauthorized Rusical" is the seventh episode of the twelfth season of the American reality competition television series RuPaul's Drag Race. It originally aired on VH1 on April 10, 2020. The episode's main challenge tasks the contestants with performing in a Rusical (musical theatre production) about Madonna. Winnie Harlow and Alexandria Ocasio-Cortez are guest judges and Jamal Sims is a guest choreographer.

Gigi Goode wins the episode's main challenge. Brita is eliminated from the competition after placing in the bottom and losing a lip-sync contest against Heidi N Closet to "Burning Up" by Madonna.

== Episode ==
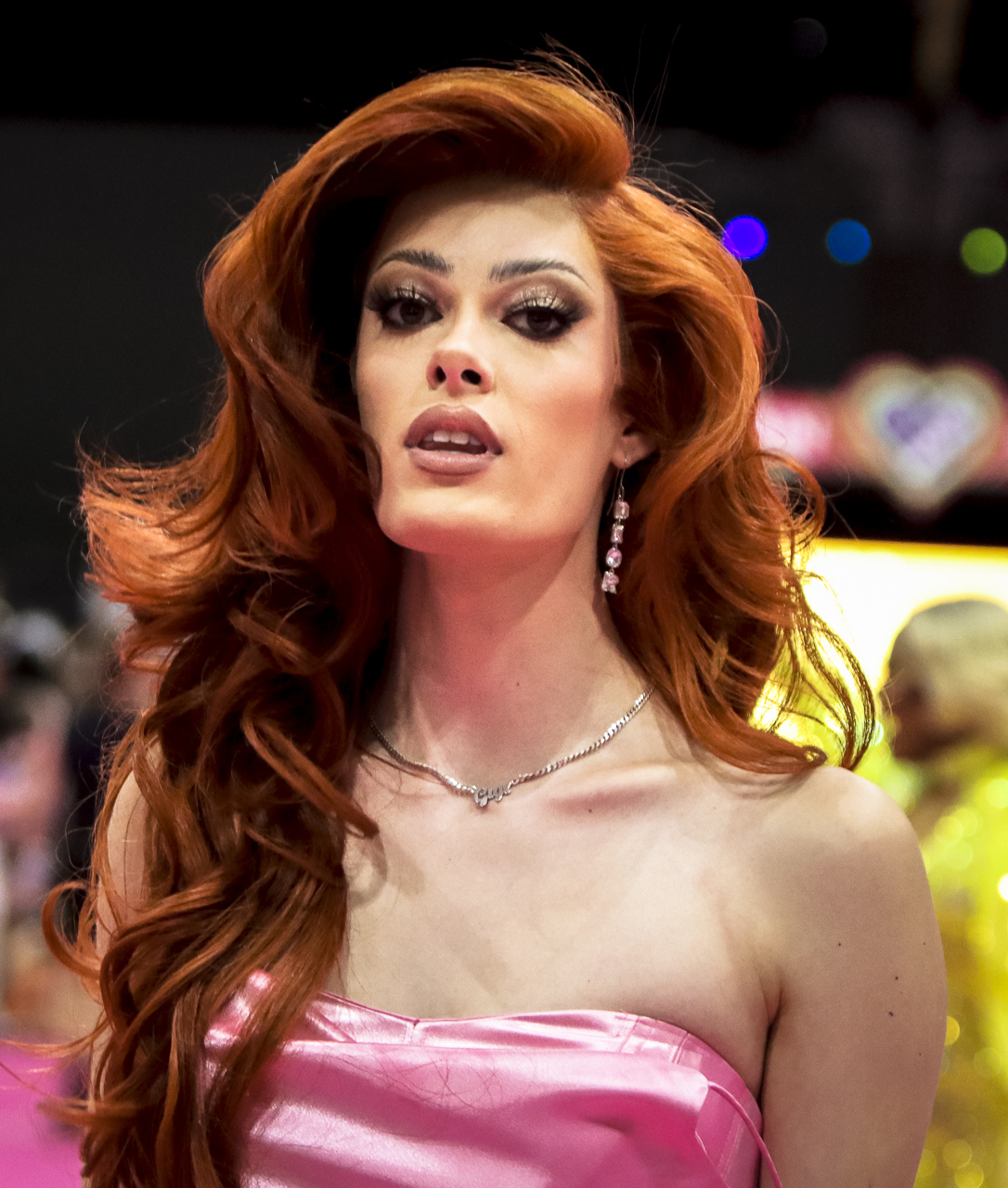
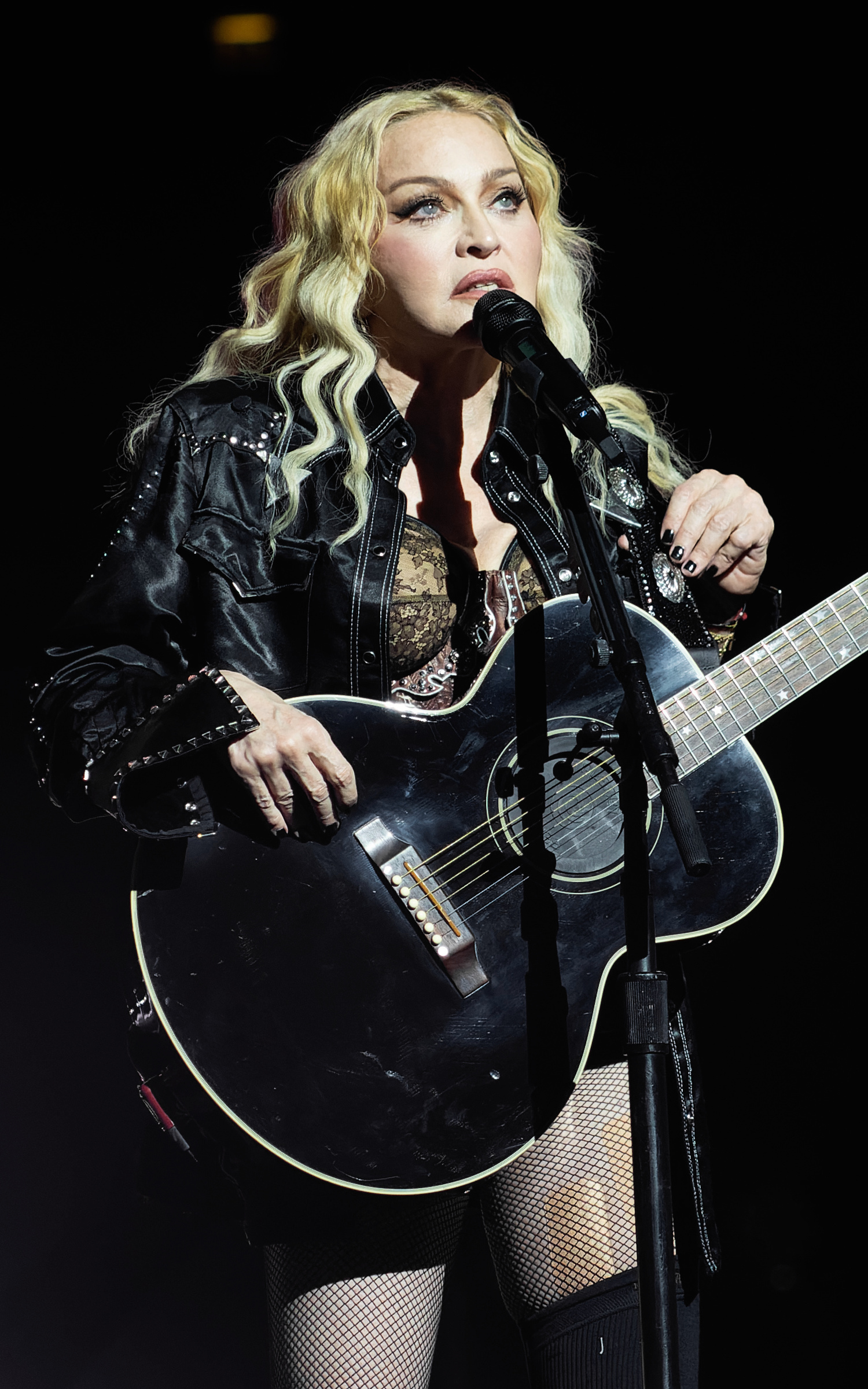
Gigi Goode (left, pictured at RuPaul's DragCon LA in 2022) wins the episode's main challenge, which tasks contestants with performing in a Rusical about Madonna (right, pictured in 2023).

The contestants return to the Werk Room after Aiden Zhane's elimination on the previous episode. On a new day, RuPaul greets the group and reveals the main challenge, which tasks the contestants with performing in a Rusical (musical theatre production) about Madonna. Competitors must record vocals to Madonna-inspired songs, then dance and lip-sync on the main stage as they embody the singer at different points in her career. The contestants select the following roles:

- Brita is Cone Bra Madonna
- Crystal Methyd is Enlightened Madonna
- Gigi Goode is Unapologetic Madonna
- Heidi N Closet is Madonna Forever
- Jackie Cox is Boy Toy Madonna
- Jaida Essence Hall is Sexy Madonna
- Jan is Early Madonna
- Sherry Pie is Movie Star Madonna
- Widow Von'Du is Femmepire Madonna

The contestants record vocals with Michelle Visage and producers Erik Paparozzi and David Benjamin Steinberg, then rehearse choreography with Jamal Sims on the main stage.

On elimination day, the contestants make final preparations in the Werk Room for the Rusical and fashion show. The contestants talk about Madonna and her career. Heidi N Closet talks about her uncle, who died of HIV/AIDS, and about her relationship with her father. Crystal Methyd also discusses her father and his battle with ALS. On the main stage, RuPaul welcomes fellow judges Visage and Carson Kressley, as well as guest judges Winnie Harlow and Alexandria Ocasio-Cortez. RuPaul reveals the runway category ("Night of 1,000 Michelle Visages"). The contestants perform the Rusical, then the fashion show commences. The judges deliver their critiques, deliberate, then share the results with the group. Gigi Goode wins the main challenge. Brita and Heidi N Closet placed in the bottom and face off in a lip-sync contest to Madonna's "Burning Up" (1983). Heidi N Closet wins the lip-sync and Brita is eliminated from the competition.

== Production and broadcast ==
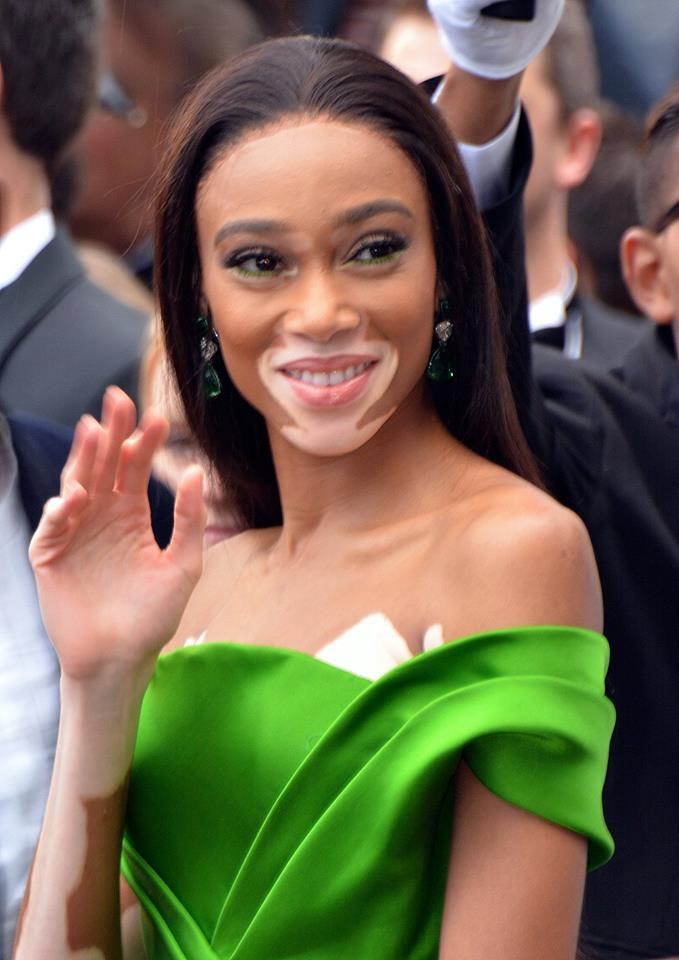
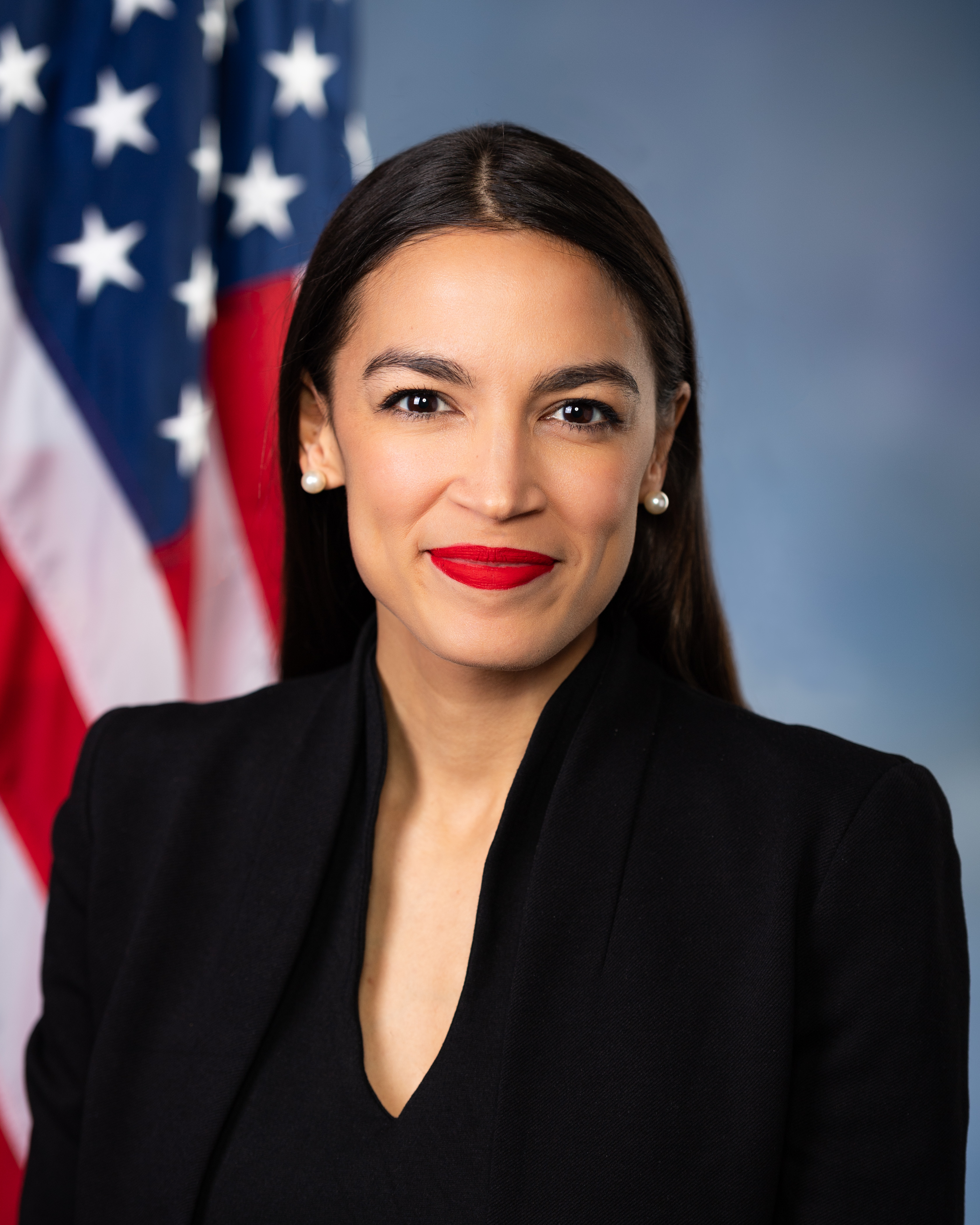
Winnie Harlow (top) and Alexandria Ocasio-Cortez (bottom) are guest judges.

The episode originally aired on April 10, 2020.

The Rusical is approximately 12 minutes long. Out magazine said the performance was "raunchier" than what aired. Gigi Goode does a flip during the production.

=== Fashion ===
For the main stage, RuPaul wears a short red dress, black boots and matching gloves, as well as a large blonde wig. For the fashion show, Jan wears Visage's pink flight attendant outfit from the "Glamazonian Airways" episode on the show's seventh season. Jackie Cox wears a short black dress, tall black boots, and a large dark wig. Gigi Goode wears a light blue outfit, long nails, and a blonde wig. Brita wears a blue dress resembling one worn by Visage on the finale on the tenth season. Jaida Essence Hall has a black outfit, a necklace with the text "icon", large earrings, and a dark wig. Sherry Pie wears a pink outfit resembling one designed for Visage by Marc Jacobs. Crystal Methyd wears a red outfit and red wig. Widow Von'Du has blue pants with white stars, a red artificial leather top, black shoes, and a long red wig. Heidi N Closet has a short dress, a cape, and a large bun for hair.

== Reception ==
Kate Kulzick gave the episode a rating of 'A-'. Paul McCallion of Vulture rated the episode 4 out of 5 stars.

Bustle's Kayla Blanton wrote, "If next season gets a Rusical, this one will be hard to top." Out's Mikelle Street published a review of the episode called "Drag Race's Madonna Rusical Was One of the Best in Herstory". In 2025, Sim said: "Some fans remember 'Madonna: The Rusical' as the episode that prompted Jan's infamous face crack. But generally speaking, the overall fanbase praises this Drag Race season 12 challenge as one of the best Rusicals of all time." Stephen Daw ranked the performance second in Billboard's 2025 list of the show's Rusicals, writing: "This Rusical had just about everything — incredible performances, a strong well of material to pull from, excellently orchestrated music and stellar choreography. It's hard to beat Madge, so it's no wonder why Madonna: The Unauthorized Rusical is one of the very best Rusicals in the history of Drag Race."

Michelle Rennex of Junkee included Jan in a 2021 list of contestants who were "undeniably robbed" on the show. Jan's reaction to not winning the challenge became a meme. In 2023, Sim called Jan's facial expression "iconic" and included her "face crack" in a list of the show's 25 "most iconic and gag-worthy moments".

== See also ==
- Cultural impact of Madonna
- Fashion of Madonna
- Madonna as a gay icon
- Madonna fandom
- Madonna impersonator
