= Night of the Living Drag =

Halloween-themed drag event

- Frequency: Annually

Night of the Living Drag is an annual Halloween tour featuring drag performers from RuPaul's Drag Race and the Drag Race franchise.

Performers in 2022 included Aquaria, Asia O'Hara, Bosco, DeJa Skye, Kim Chi, Lady Camden, Rosé, and Vanessa Vanjie Mateo.

Performers in 2023 included Angeria Paris VanMicheals, Denali, Icesis Couture, Jaida Essence Hall, Jorgeous, Plastique Tiara, Rosé, Tayce, and Yvie Oddly.

== See also ==
- Bring Back My Ghouls, a 2020 Halloween variety special
