= A Drag Queen Christmas =

Drag tour in the United States

- Tour by Alumni of RuPaul's Drag Race

A Drag Queen Christmas is a 2017-2019 drag tour featuring alumni of RuPaul's Drag Race.

== History ==
The "Return to Order" campaign, led by the American Society for the Defense of Tradition, Family and Property, sought to end the series and cancel a scheduled December 2019 performance at Folly Theatre in Kansas City, Missouri. The campaign gathered 13,000 signatures. Scheduled performers were Aja, Chi Chi DeVayne, Eureka O'Hara, Farrah Moan, Kim Chi, Latrice Royale, Sasha Velour, and Shea Couleé, with Trinity the Tuck hosting.

=== Tour dates ===
- November 26, 2017 – Lincoln Theatre, Washington, D.C.
- November 27, 2017 – Dominion Arts Center, Richmond
- December 10, 2017 – Buckhead Theatre, Atlanta
- December 15, 2017 – Orpheum Theatre, Wichita, Kansas
- November 14, 2018 – State Theater, Portland, Maine
- November 25, 2018 – Detroit
- November 30, 2018 – St. Louis
- December 7, 2018 – Denver, Colorado
- December 22, 2018 – House of Blues, Houston, Texas
- November 22, 2019 – Modell Lyric, Baltimore
- November 25, 2019 – College Street Music Hall, New Haven
- December 1, 2019 – St. Louis
- December 3, 2019 – Pantages Theatre, Minneapolis
- December 5, 2019 – Fillmore Auditorium, Denver, Colorado
- December 14, 2019 – Abraham Chavez Theatre, El Paso, Texas
- December 17, 2019 – Folly Theater, Kansas City
- December 19, 2019 – Austin, Texas
- December 28, 2019 – Parker Playhouse, Fort Lauderdale, Florida
- December 29, 2019 – Ferguson Hall, Straz Center for the Performing Arts, Tampa, Florida
