= Widow Von'Du =

American drag performer

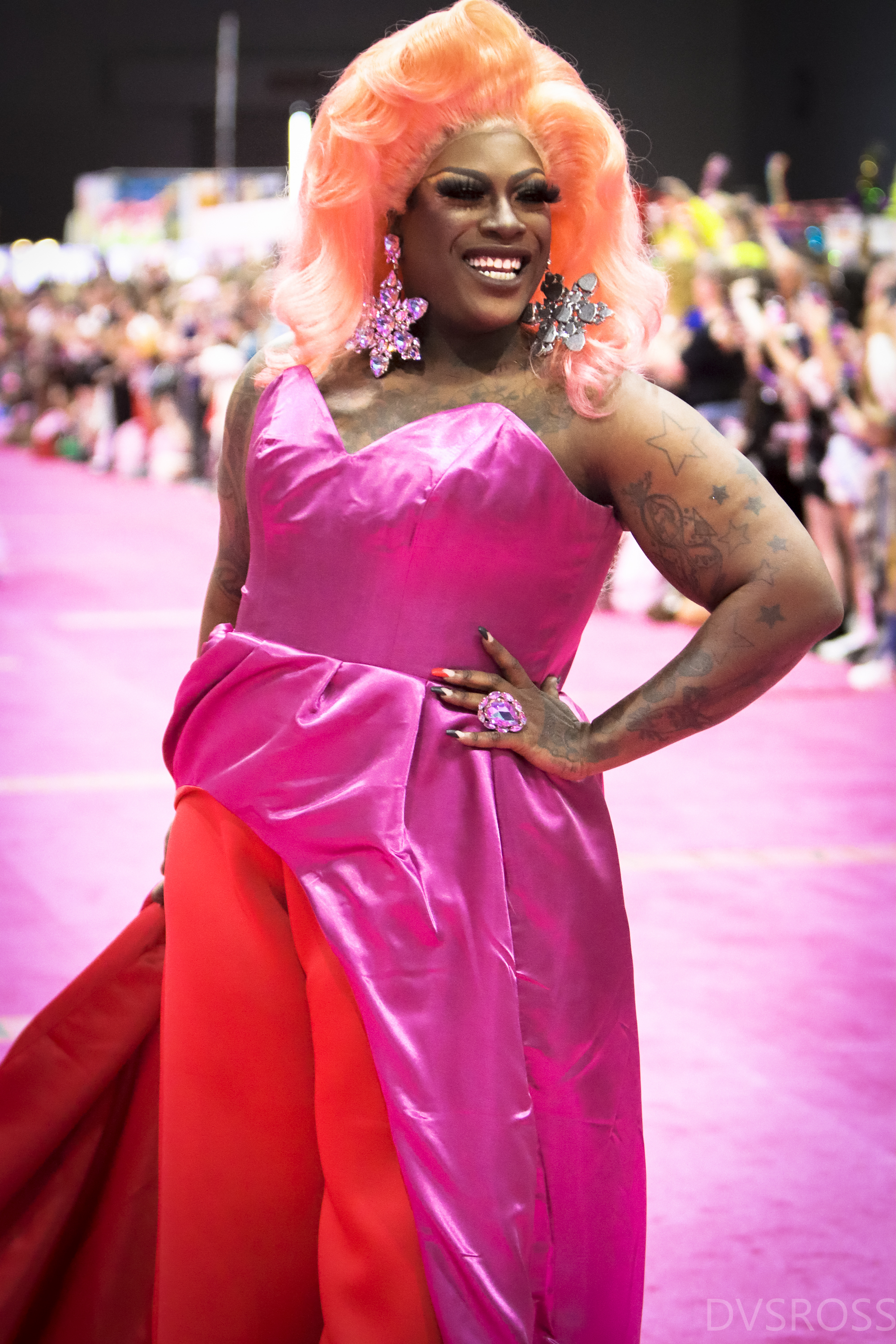
- Widow Von'Du at RuPaul's DragCon, 2022
- Born: Ray Anthony Fry; April 17, 1989 (age 36); Kansas City, Missouri, U.S.
- Television: RuPaul's Drag Race (season 12)
- Website: widowvonduofficial.com

Ray Anthony Fry (born April 17, 1989), better known under the stage name The Widow Von'Du (or simply Widow Von Du), is an American drag performer known for competing on the twelfth season of RuPaul's Drag Race. He has since released an album.

== Career ==
Fry has won the title of Queen of KC at Kansas City Pridefest and Princess of Gay Pride 2008. He created the local "Drag Survivor" competition at Hamburger Mary's KC.

After unsuccessfully auditioning for season 11, Widow Von'Du was announced as a cast member on season 12 of RuPaul's Drag Race on January 23, 2020.

In September 2020, he was featured alongside many other Black RuPaul's Drag Race alum in a "Stop the Racism" PSA, speaking out against toxic, racist fans within the Drag Race community.

== Personal life ==
Fry took capoeira for six years prior to doing drag. He was homeless for a year.

On May 31, 2021, Fry was arrested in Jackson County, Missouri, for assaulting his partner. Reports said Fry punched his partner and knocked him out. Fry was charged with one count of domestic assault in the first degree and three counts of domestic assault in the second degree. Fry is currently serving probation of three years per Missouri court database records.

== Filmography ==
=== Television ===
Year	Title	Role	Notes	Ref
2020	RuPaul's Drag Race (season 12)	Herself	Contestant	
2020	RuPaul's Drag Race: Untucked	Herself	Contestant	
2020	Let's Be Real	Herself	Guest appearance	

=== Music videos ===
==== Featured and cameo roles ====
Year	Title	Artist	Role	Ref(s)
2020	"Nerves of Steel"	Erasure	Cameo	
2021	"G.A.P."	Heidi N Closet feat. Widow Von Du	Feature	

=== Web series ===
Year	Title	Role	Notes	Ref
2020	Whatcha Packin'	Herself	Guest	
2020	The X Change Rate	Herself	Guest	
2020	Bring Back My Ghouls	Herself	Guest	
2022	Bring Back My Girls	Herself	Guest	

== Discography ==
=== Albums ===
Title	Details	Ref
The	Released: October 31, 2020; Label: self-released; Formats: digital download	

=== Singles ===
==== As lead artist ====
Title	Year	Album
"Yes Bitch! She Might Be!"	2020	The
"Keep That Same Energy"	2020	The
"WDGAF"	2021	non-album single

==== As featured artist ====
Title	Year	Album
"I'm That Bitch" (with The Cast of RuPaul's Drag Race Season 12)	2020	non-album singles
"Madonna: The Unauthorized Rusical" (with The Cast of RuPaul's Drag Race Season 12)	2020	non-album singles
"The Shady Bunch" (with The Cast of RuPaul's Drag Race Season 12)	2020	non-album singles
"G.A.P." (with Heidi N Closet)	2021	non-album singles

=== Guest appearances ===
Title	Year	Album
"Black Ariel" (Aja featuring Widow Von'Du, Amira Wang and Kezra Leon)	2021	Crown
