= Heidi N Closet =

American drag queen

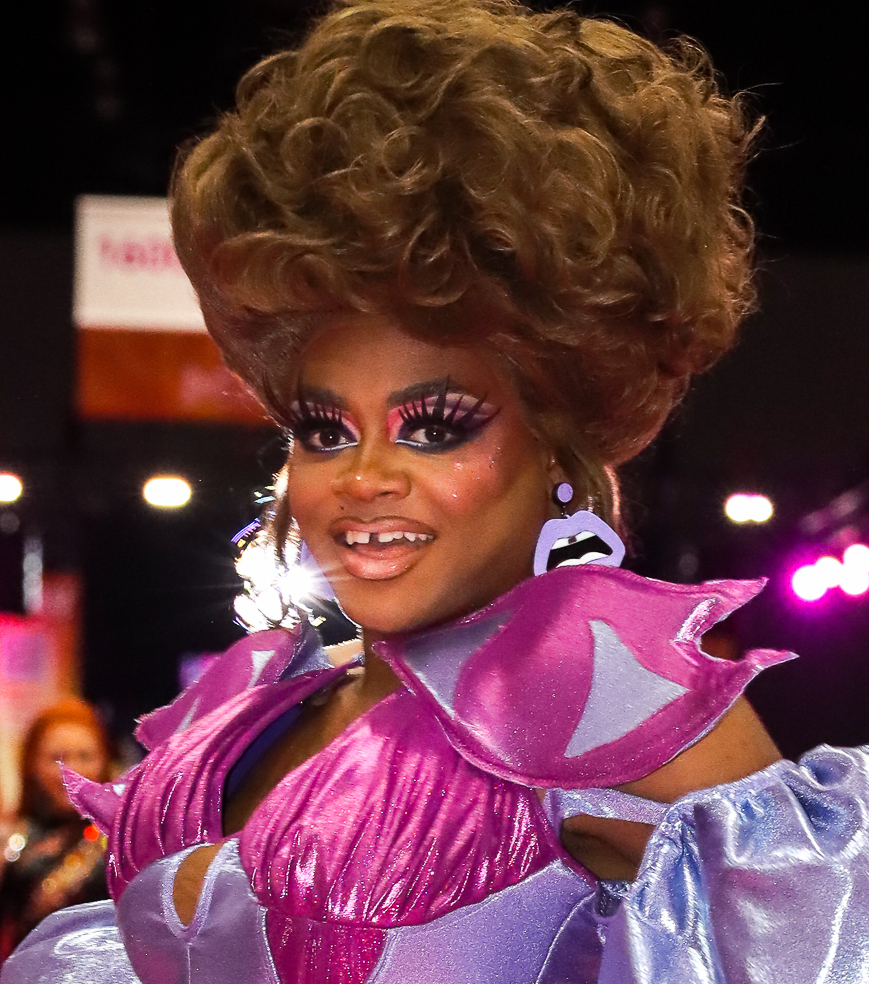
- Heidi N Closet in 2024
- Born: Trevien Anthonie Cheek; September 29, 1994 (age 32); Ramseur, North Carolina, U.S.
- Occupations: Drag queen, entertainer
- Known for: RuPaul's Drag Race (season 12); RuPaul's Drag Race All Stars (season 8)
- Title: Miss Congeniality
- Predecessor: Nina West
- Successor: LaLa Ri

Heidi N Closet is the stage name of Trevien Anthonie Cheek, an American drag queen from Ramseur, North Carolina, best known for competing on the twelfth season of RuPaul's Drag Race, where she placed 6th and won the Miss Congeniality award. She returned to the eighth season of RuPaul’s Drag Race All Stars, but decided to quit the competition early, citing her mental health and wellbeing as the reason for her withdrawal.

== Early life ==
Cheek was raised in Ramseur, North Carolina. His mother died at a young age, and he is estranged from his father. He was raised by his grandmother.

== Career ==
In 2014, shortly after turning 18, Cheek's sister invited him to a drag show in Winston-Salem, North Carolina. Cheek has said of seeing his first drag show, "I saw the glamour of being able to do whatever you want to do." Cheek said his drag name "came from a joke. It started out as a lot of men from my hometown are closeted and they would always try and get my goodies and whatnotries. I was like, 'There's no need to be hiding in the closet.'"

Cheek's participation as a cast member on season 12 of RuPaul’s Drag Race was announced on January 23, 2020. He is the third contestant on the show from North Carolina, following Victoria "Porkchop" Parker (Season 1) and Stacy Layne Matthews (Season 3), and had not previously auditioned for the show. Heidi experienced an allergic reaction on her first day of shooting, but finished safe. During the competition, RuPaul expressed disapproval with her name choice, stating during episode 10: "I don't know if you've heard the story, but she came here as Heidi N Closet. Rotten!" With each episode RuPaul refers to Heidi by different names, including Heidi Ho, Heidi N Seeky, Heidi Hydrates, and Heidi Afrodite. Despite this, Heidi revealed during the Season 12 reunion episode that she had decided to keep her name.

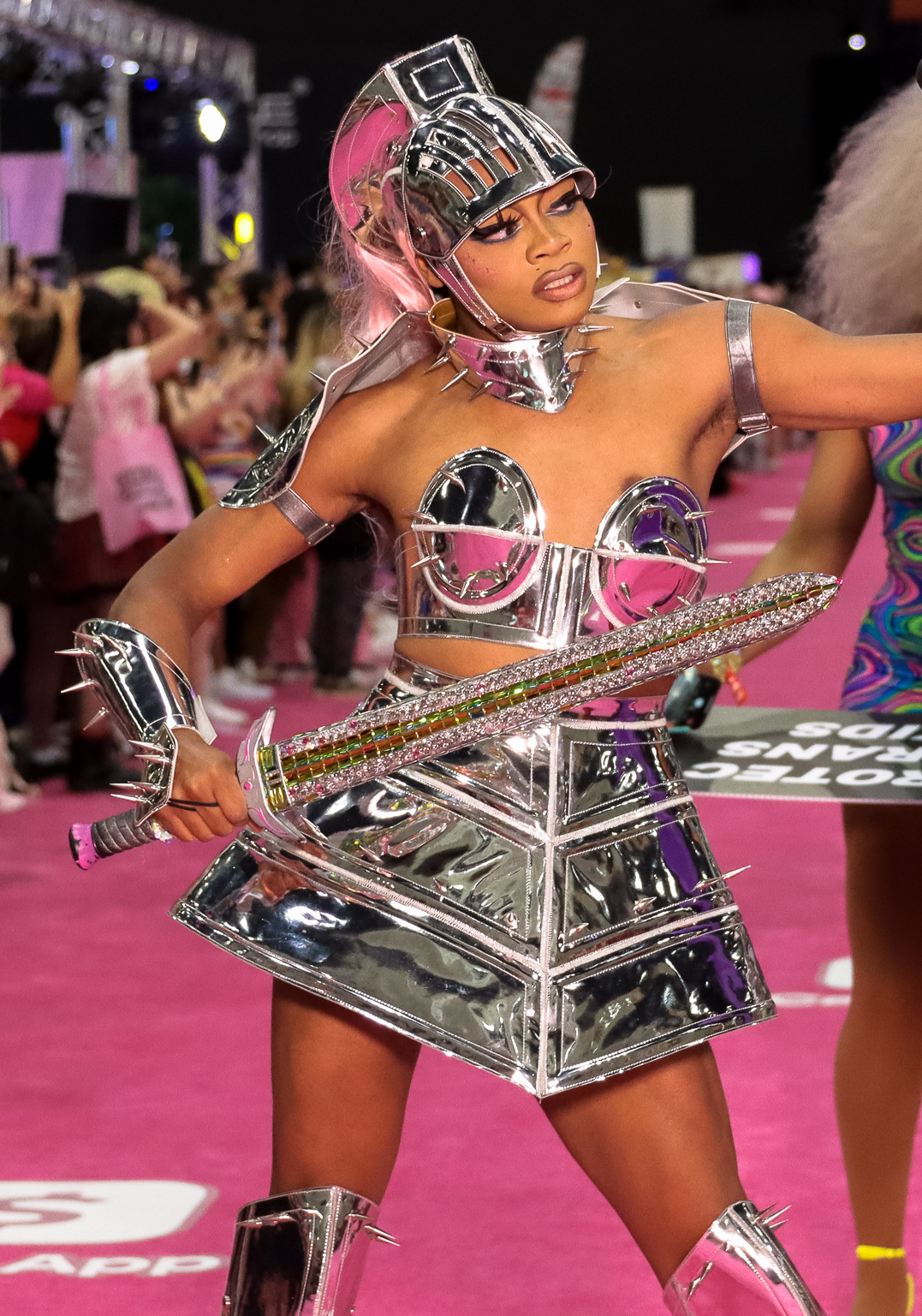
Heidi N Closet at RuPaul's DragCon LA in 2023

Heidi was dubbed the "heart" of the season by Out. During the competition, she placed in the top three times, winning one challenge. She also placed in the bottom two on four occasions. Her first two times in the bottom she survived the lip sync, sending home Nicky Doll and Brita respectively. Her third time in the bottom she lip-synced against Jackie Cox, and both were saved by RuPaul in a double shantay. She was eliminated in the eleventh episode, placing 6th overall in the competition, after losing her fourth lip sync to eventual winner of the season Jaida Essence Hall. During the season finale, she was named Miss Congeniality as voted on by her peers.

Cheek has experienced extreme poverty in his life and career, having indicated that he made $9,000 the year before competing on Ru Paul's Drag Race, while working at a gas station. When talking on her show Gap Chat, Heidi said, "When I went to Drag Race, I actually had only 33 cents in my bank account the day I showed up [...] Even to just pay for the suitcases to get there was stressful." Many queens join the show hoping that experience will pay out for them, but they first need to have a significant amount of money upfront to pay for their looks. Cheek borrowed money from his boyfriend and friends for materials, then sewed all his looks with his drag sisters. The quality of the looks came up during the season during various moments but the different financial starting points were never openly acknowledged. The show does not give any financial support to participants, they must all come with their costumes and are only compensated a few hundred dollars an episode. Heidi recounted the experience, "I’m sitting up here spending between $4,000 and $5,000 on everything. Whereas some girls spent 20, 30, 40, even $50,000 on garments [...] Yeah, my garments just aren’t gonna stand up to their outfits. It’s just not gonna happen.”

Heidi N Closet competed on the eighth season of RuPaul's Drag Race All Stars (2023). She decided to quit the competition early, self-eliminating in Episode 5 of the series.

In 2024, Heidi N Closet starred as Robin Banks in the Tubi horror comedy film Slay, alongside fellow Drag Race alumni Cara Melle, Crystal Methyd, and Trinity the Tuck.

=== Music ===
In February 2021, she released a music video for her first single, G.A.P, a parody of "WAP", featuring fellow RuPaul's Drag Race season twelve alum Widow Von'Du. In 2021, Cheek was featured in Tiger Queens: The Tiger King Musical, a TikTok musical parody of Tiger King, starring as the tiger.

== Personal life ==
Cheek is gay and currently living in Los Angeles.

== Filmography ==
=== Film ===
Year	Title	Role	Notes
2021	The Bitch Who Stole Christmas	Gorge Intern	
2024	Stan Behavior	Cutie Pie	
2024	Slay	Robin Banks	Tubi original horror film

=== Television ===
Year	Title	Role	Notes	Ref
2020	RuPaul's Drag Race (season 12)	Herself	Contestant (6th Place)	
2020	RuPaul's Drag Race: Untucked	Herself	Contestant	
2021	RuPaul's Drag Race (season 13)	Herself	Guest (2 episodes)	
2021	RuPaul's Drag Race All Stars (season 6)	Herself	"Lip Sync Assassin" (episode 8)	
2021	RuPaul's Drag Race All Stars: Untucked (season 3)	Herself	"Lip Sync Assassin" (episode 8)	
2023	RuPaul's Drag Race All Stars (season 8)	Herself	Contestant	
2023	RuPaul's Drag Race All Stars: Untucked (season 5)	Herself	Contestant	
2023	Drag Me to Dinner	Herself	Hulu original	

=== Music videos ===
Year	Title	Artist	Ref.
2020	"Always"	Waze & Odyssey	
2020	"Gorgeois"	Rigel Gemini	
2020	"STFUK"	Salina EsTitties	
2020	"Fallen Angel"	Erasure	
2021	"G.A.P."	Herself	
2023	"True Colors"	Kylie Sonique Love	

=== Web series ===
Year	Title	Role	Notes	Ref
2020	In Touch Weekly	Himself	Guest	
2020	Whatcha Packin'	Himself	Guest	
2020	Review with a Jew	Herself	Guest	
2020	The X Change Rate	Herself	Guest	
2020	Hey Qween!	Herself	Guest	
2020	Countdown to the Crown	Himself/Herself	Guest	
2020	The Pit Stop	Herself	Guest	
2020	Gap Chat	Herself	Host	
2020	RuPaul's Drag Race: Bring Back My Ghouls	Herself	Host	
2021	That's a Gay Ass Podcast	Herself	Podcast	
2021	The Queerties Awards	Herself	Host	
2021	The Pit Stop	Herself	Guest	
2021	Drag Tots	Judy Thorns	Season 2	
2021	The Awardist	Herself	Guest	
2021	Binge Queens	Herself	Guest	
2021	Out of the Closet	Herself	Guest	
2022	Muff Busters	Herself	WOWPresents+ Original	
2022	Bring Back My Girls	Herself	WOWPresents+ Original	
2022	A Familiar Problem: Sprinkle’s Incredible Journey	Clapp	Critical Role one-shot episode	
2022	Tartan Around	Herself	Guest	
2023	Meet the Queens	Herself	Stand-alone special RuPaul's Drag Race All Stars 8	
2023	EW News Flash	Herself	Guest	
2023	BuzzFeed Celeb	Herself	Guest	
2023	React to TikTok Trends by Allure	Herself	Guest	
2023	Give It to Me Straight	Herself	Guest	

== Discography ==
=== Featured singles ===
Title	Year	Album
"I'm That Bitch" (with The Cast of RuPaul's Drag Race Season 12)	2020	non-album single
"Madonna: The Unauthorized Rusical" (with The Cast of RuPaul's Drag Race Season 12)	2020	non-album single
"The Shady Bunch" (with The Cast of RuPaul's Drag Race Season 12)	2020	non-album single
"Money, Success, Fame, Glamour" (Glam Rock version) (with the cast of RuPaul's Drag Race All Stars, season 8)	2023	non-album single

== Titles ==
Competition	Title	Year
North Carolina Entertainer of the Year F.I.	Won	2019
RuPaul's Drag Race	Miss C	2020

== Awards and nominations ==
Year	Award	Category	Work	Result	Ref.
2022	WOWIE Awards	Best TikTok	Herself	Nominated	
2023	Queerty Awards	Podcast	Hall & Closet	Nominated	
