= Jaida Essence Hall =

American drag queen

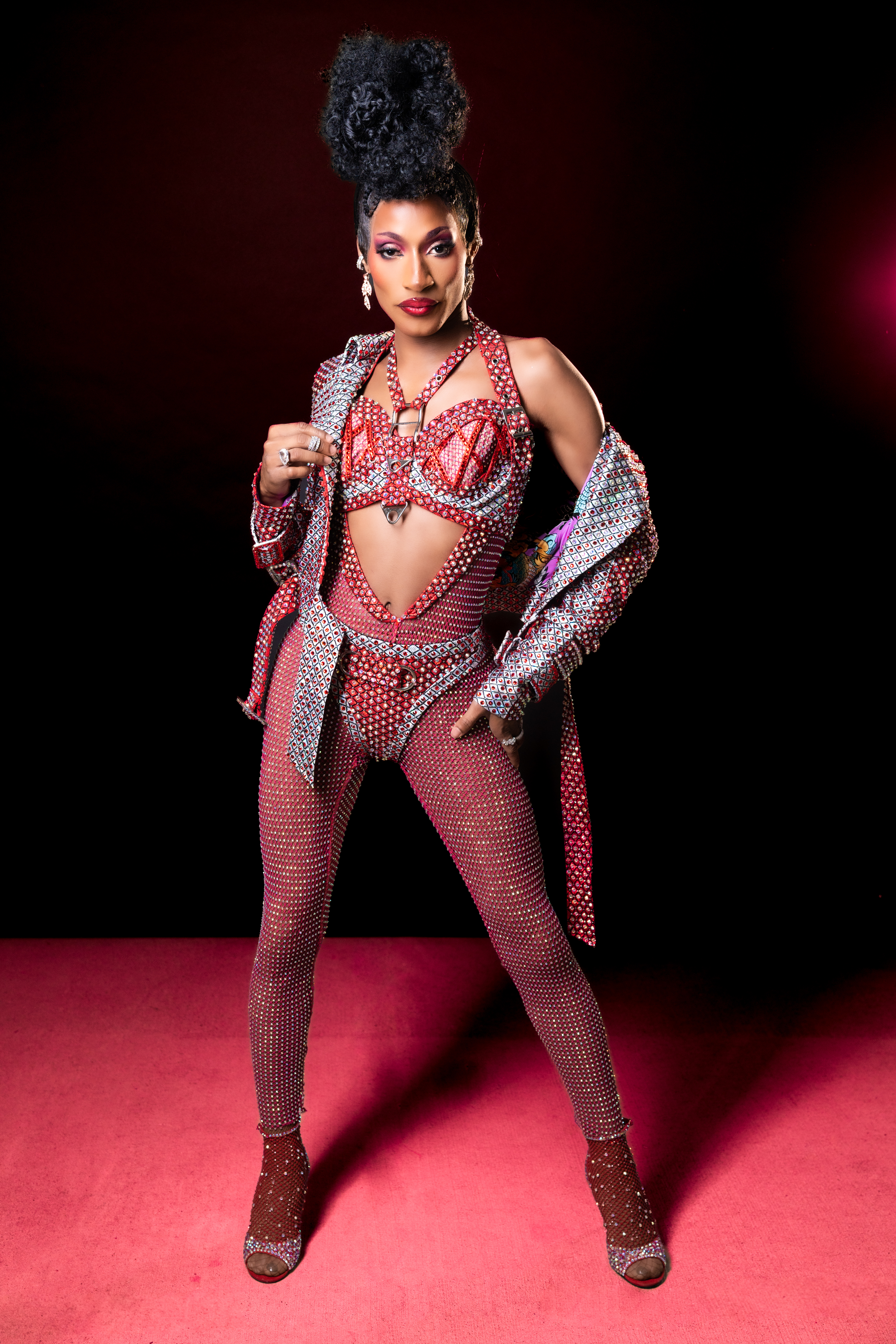
- Jaida Essence Hall in 2022
- Born: Jared Johnson; December 9, 1988 (age 37); Milwaukee, Wisconsin, U.S.
- Occupation: Drag queen
- Television: RuPaul's Drag Race (season 12); RuPaul's Drag Race All Stars (season 7)
- Website: jaidaehall.com

Jared Johnson (born December 9, 1988), best known by the stage name Jaida Essence Hall, is an American drag queen and reality television personality best known for winning the twelfth season of RuPaul's Drag Race, and later returning to compete on the seventh season of RuPaul's Drag Race All Stars, an all-winners season. Since her season aired in 2020, Hall has been a staple of several domestic and international tours that feature Drag Race contestants, including Werq the World, A Drag Queen Christmas, and Drive 'N Drag. In October 2020, Johnson was a featured performer in Rihanna's Savage X Fenty Fashion Show Vol. 2.

== Early life ==
Johnson was born in Milwaukee, Wisconsin. He is the third contestant from the city to compete on RuPaul's Drag Race and the second winner after Trixie Mattel (winner of All Stars Season 3). He cites Milwaukee's sense of community and diversity of drag as major influences, especially its country tongue. He performed for a period of time at Hamburger Mary's.

== Career ==
Johnson began drag in the early 2010s. Her name is a product of personal anecdotes and experiences that hold meaning. A friend called her "Jaida" when she put on a wig for the first time, and the name stuck. "Essence" came from her boyfriend, who called her "the essence of beauty" in a text message. "Hall" is the name of her drag family; her mothers are Tajma Hall and Prada Diamond, and her drag sisters are Mercedes Iman Diamond, Naysha Lopez, Dida Ritz, and Kahmora Hall.

She rose to prominence in the drag scene through pageantry, winning titles such as Miss Five, Miss Gay Madison, Miss Wisconsin Club, and Miss City of the Lakes. She also performed a halftime show at a 2019 Milwaukee Bucks game. Jaida is known for her design eye and makes many of her own outfits; her boyfriend makes her jewelry. She is also a makeup artist and painted Silky Nutmeg Ganache's face for the season eleven finale of RuPaul's Drag Race.

In July and August 2020, Hall toured with Drive 'N Drag, a drive-in drag show held outdoors to accommodate social distancing restrictions imposed due to COVID-19. Johnson was featured on the cover of the September issue of Attitude magazine in 2020. In October 2020, Johnson was a featured performer in Rihanna's Savage X Fenty Fashion Show Vol. 2. In September 2021, she performed alongside Christina Aguilera at LadyLand Festival. The following month, she performed at PridetoberFest at Henry Maier Festival Park in Milwaukee, and the 10th annual Night of the Living Drag: The North American Halloween Tour. In December 2021, she performed at the A Drag Queen Christmas event, produced by Murray & Peter.

In January 2022, Jaida Essence Hall was added to the rotating cast of a dozen Drag Race queens in RuPaul's Drag Race Live!, a Las Vegas show residency at the Flamingo Las Vegas. In March, Jaida Essence Hall, alongside the rest of the RuPaul's Drag Race Live! cast, performed with Katy Perry during her Play concert residency at Resorts World Las Vegas. In April 2022, she hosted a Grammy-inspired Fashion Show sponsored by TikTok. In July 2023, it was announced that Hall, alongside Priyanka and Sasha Velour, would be the new hosts of the fourth and final season of reality television series We're Here. The three replaced the previous hosts, Eureka, Shangela, and Bob the Drag Queen. In 2024, she was announced as one of eight former Drag Race contestants participating in Painting with Raven, a spin-off of the WOW Presents Plus series Painted with Raven.

=== RuPaul's Drag Race ===
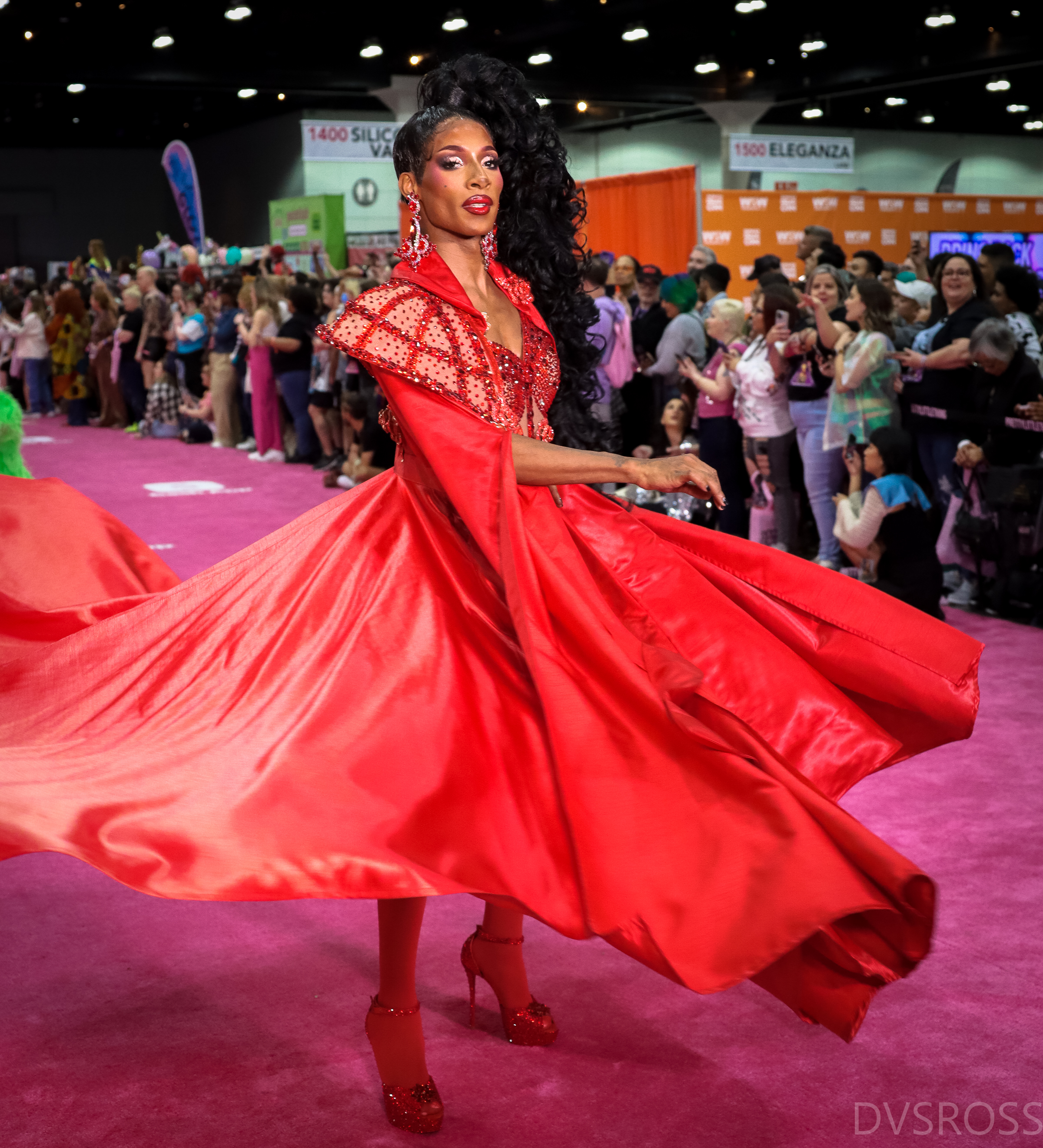
Jaida Essence Hall at RuPaul's DragCon LA in 2023

Jaida was announced as a contestant on the twelfth season of RuPaul's Drag Race on January 23, 2020. During her time on the show, she won three main challenges, including the Fosse-style number on episode two ("You Don't Know Me"), the political debate on episode nine, and the makeover on episode ten. She also had one appearance in the bottom two, after a shaky performance in the one-woman show on episode eleven. Jaida ultimately sent fan favorite, and eventual Miss Congeniality winner Heidi N Closet home after a lip sync showdown to Prince's hit song "1999". She was crowned the winner (virtually) on May 29, 2020, after winning a three-way lip sync against Crystal Methyd and Gigi Goode to "Survivor" by Destiny's Child. This performance earned Jaida a nomination for the 2020 People's Choice Awards, in the Competition Contestant category.

She returned in the eleventh episode of the sixth season of RuPaul's Drag Race All Stars as a "Lip Sync Assassin", where she lipsynced against Eureka! to Little Richard's "Good Golly Miss Molly". In April 2022, Jaida Essence Hall was announced as one of the eight returning winners that would be competing in seventh season of RuPaul's Drag Race All Stars, the first ever all-winners season of Drag Race. She won the third episode, and successfully lipsynced against Trinity the Tuck to Beyonce's "Green Light".

== Personal life ==
Johnson is queer and was formerly based in West Allis. He has since relocated to Las Vegas.

== Filmography ==
=== Movies ===
Year	Title	Role	Notes	Ref
2020	Savage X Fenty Show Vol. 2	Herself	Fashion special	

=== Television ===
Year	Title	Role	Notes	Ref
2019	Milwaukee Bucks game	Herself	Halftime Show Performer	
2020	RuPaul's Drag Race (season 12)	Contestant	Winner	
2020	RuPaul's Drag Race: Untucked (season 11)	Contestant	Winner	
2020	The Daily Show with Trevor Noah	Herself	Guest	
2021	Watch What Happens Live with Andy Cohen	Herself	Guest	
2021	RuPaul's Drag Race (season 13)	Herself	Guest	
2021	RuPaul's Drag Race All Stars (season 6)	Herself	"Lip Sync Assassin" (episode 11)	
2021	RuPaul's Drag Race All Stars: Untucked (season 3)	Herself	"Lip Sync Assassin" (episode 11)	
2022	RuPaul's Drag Race (season 14)	Herself	Guest	
2022	RuPaul's Drag Race All Stars (season 7)	Herself	Contestant	
2022	RuPaul's Drag Race All Stars: Untucked (season 4)	Herself	Contestant	
2022	Trixie Motel	Herself	Guest appearance	
2022	The View	Herself	Guest appearance	
2022	Countdown to All Stars 7: You’re a Winner Baby	Herself	VH1 special	
2023	VH1 Black History Month with Santwon, Jaida Essence Hall, & Brooke Valentine	Herself	VH1 special	
2023	Drag Me to Dinner	Herself	Hulu original	
2023	Canada's Drag Race (season 4)	Herself	Guest judge	
2024	We're Here (season 4)	Herself	HBO series, Season 4	
2024	Everybody Still Hates Chris	Drag Queen (voice)	Episode: "Everybody Still Hates Bullies"	

=== Music videos ===
Year	Title	Artist	Ref.
2020	"Legends Never Die"	Orville Peck, Shania Twain	
2021	"GAP"	Heidi N Closet	
2022	"The Motto" (Official Drag Video)	Ava Max and Tiësto	

=== Web series ===
Year	Title	Role	Notes	Ref
2020	Cosmo Queens	Herself	Guest	
2020	Whatcha Packin'	Herself	Guest	
2020	Countdown to the Crown	Herself	Guest	
2020	Exposed	Herself	Guest	
2020	Bring Back My Ghouls	Herself	Host	
2020	GAP Chat	Herself	Guest	
2020	BINGE	Herself	Podcast; guest	
2020	Dragged Out	Herself	Guest	
2020	Hey Qween!	Herself	Guest	
2020-23	The Pit Stop	Herself	Guest	
2021	Snatched!	Herself	Podcast; Guest	
2021	The Awardist	Herself	Guest	
2022	Drag Us Weekly	Herself	Guest	
2022	Around the Table	Herself	Guest	
2022	BuzzFeed Celeb	Herself	Guest	
2022	Friendship Test	Herself	Guest	
2022	Drip or Drop?	Herself	Guest	
2022	Portrait of a Queen	Herself	Guest	

== Discography ==
=== Featured singles ===
Title	Year	Album
"You Don't Know Me" (with The Cast of RuPaul's Drag Race Season 12)	2020	Non-album singles
"Madonna: The Unauthorized Rusical" (with The Cast of RuPaul's Drag Race Season 12)	2020	Non-album singles
"I Made It / Mirror Song/ Losing Is New Winning" (Las Vegas Live Medley) (with The Cast of RuPaul's Drag Race Season 12)	2020	Non-album singles
"The Shady Bunch" (with The Cast of RuPaul's Drag Race Season 12)	2020	Non-album singles
"Legends" (Cast Version) (RuPaul featuring the cast of RuPaul's Drag Race All Stars, season 7)	2022	Non-album singles
"2gether 4eva" (The Other Girls) (with the Cast of RuPaul's Drag Race All Stars, season 7)	2022	Non-album singles

Awards and achievements
Preceded by Yvie Oddly	Winner of RuPaul's Drag Race; US season 12	Succeeded by Symone
