= Jackie Cox (drag queen) =

Canadian drag queen

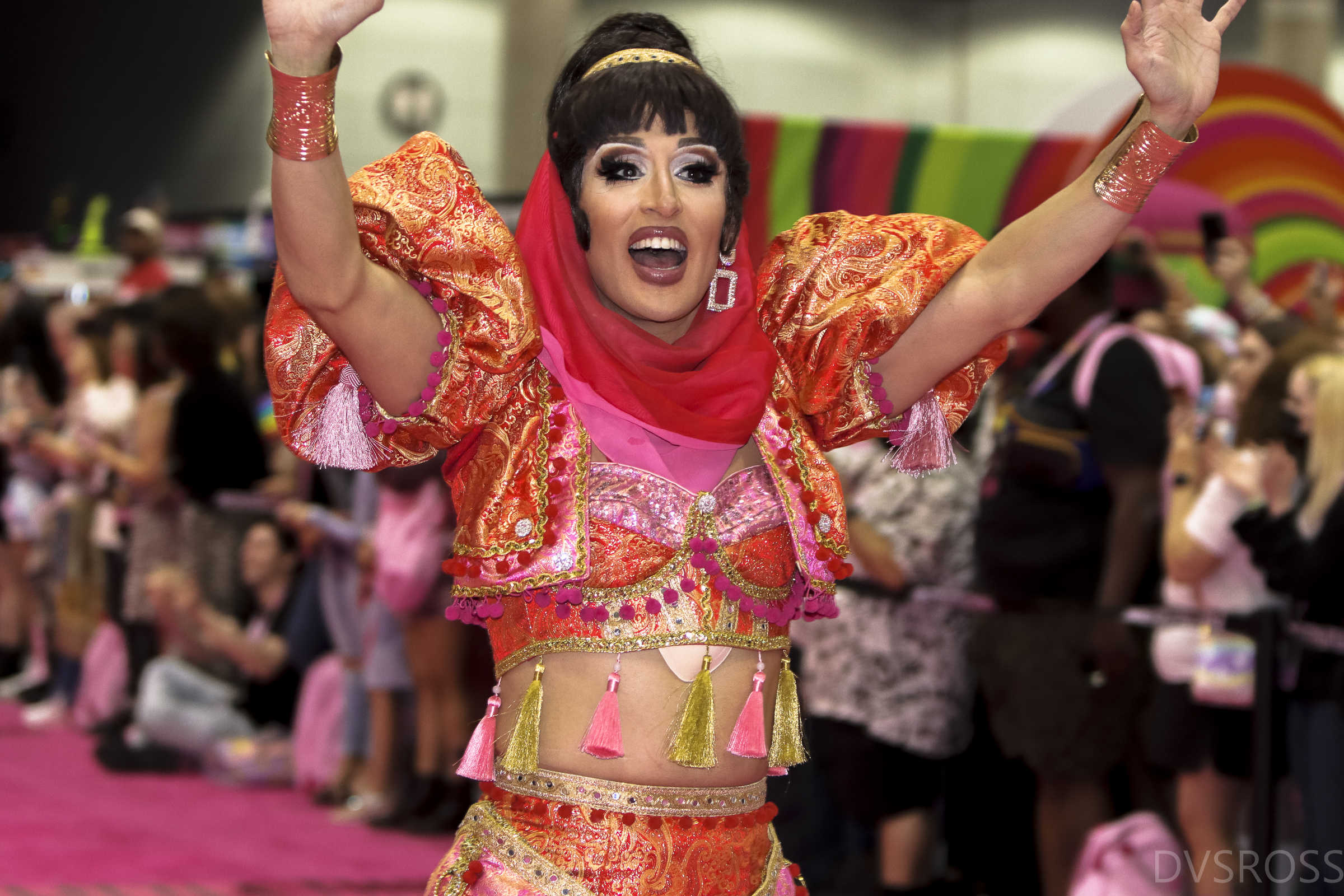
- Jackie Cox at RuPaul's DragCon LA, 2022
- Born: Darius Rose; 10 April 1985 (age 41); Halifax, Nova Scotia, Canada
- Education: University of California, Los Angeles (BA)
- Occupations: Drag queen, entertainer
- Years active: 2009–present
- Known for: RuPaul's Drag Race (season 12) (5th place)

Jackie Cox is the stage name of Darius Rose (born April 10, 1985), a Canadian drag queen based in New York City, known for being a competitor on the twelfth season of RuPaul's Drag Race and the first season of Canada's Drag Race All Stars.

== Early life ==
Rose was born in Halifax, Nova Scotia, to a Canadian father and an Iranian mother. He attended UCLA School of Theater, Film and Television to study theatre and upon graduating with his Bachelor of Arts degree, he moved to Hell's Kitchen, Manhattan with the goal of doing theatre professionally.

== Career ==
In 2002, Rose transferred to University High School in Irvine where he starred in productions of Dark of the Moon, Les Misérables and Bat Boy the musical. In 2003 he was crowned Prom King as an openly gay student. In 2009, Rose discovered drag. He played the title role in a production of Hedwig and the Angry Inch at Theatre Out at the Empire Theater, in Santa Ana, CA which was his first foray into drag. His first performance as Jackie Cox was at a competition called So You Think You Can Drag at New World Stages in New York. His drag name originated from a nickname that he and a friend, in high school, assigned to a girl that they disliked but wanted to be able to talk about her in public. As her initials were "J.C.", they came up with "Jackie Cox" as a codename.

Jackie was announced as a cast member on season 12 of RuPaul's Drag Race on January 23, 2020. She is the second Canadian contestant on the US version of the show, and the oldest performer on Season 12. Jackie became the first contestant in Drag Race history to dress in a Muslim-inspired outfit on episode 9 of the show, which had a "stars and stripes" patriotic theme. She wore a red-striped kaftan with a blue hijab outlined with 50 silver stars. Guest judge Jeff Goldblum subsequently came under fire for his comments over Jackies's hijab outfit, when asking, "Is there something in this religion that is anti-homosexuality and anti-woman? Does that complicate the issue?" for which he has been widely criticized. On the same episode, even though Jackie was praised for her choices, she found herself in the bottom two for the first time in the season and had to lip sync against competitor Widow Von'Du to Katy Perry's "Firework". The performance moved Goldblum to tears. Jackie was successful and Von'Du was eliminated.

Jackie Cox appeared on the soap opera Days of Our Lives on April 20, 2022. Chad helped Jackie to crash the wedding of Leo Stark to Dr. Craig Wesley, and announced that Leo was already married to her. He also appeared out of drag, as himself, Darius Rose. Leo claimed that he and Darius were only married to help Darius get a green card. Darius then stunned the wedding party by telling them that Leo and Craig's relationship has been "one big flim-flam," based on the money and prestige Leo believed the marriage would bring by marrying a doctor.

== Personal life ==
Jackie is gay and gender-expansive.

Out of drag, her pronouns are he/she/they.

== Filmography ==
=== Television ===
Year	Title	Role	Notes	Ref
2017	Watch What Happens Live with Andy Cohen	Himself	Guest	
2018	What Would You Do? (ABC)	Himself	Actor	
2020	RuPaul's Drag Race (season 12)	Herself	Contestant (4th place)	
2020	RuPaul's Drag Race: Untucked	Herself	Contestant	
2021	Days of Our Lives: Beyond Salem	Herself	Limited series	
2022	Days of Our Lives	Herself	Guest role	
2026	Star Trek: Starfleet Academy	Bartender	Guest role	

=== Web series ===
Year	Title	Role	Notes	Ref
2020	Review with a Jew	Himself	Guest	
2020	Whatcha Packin'	Herself	Guest	
2020	RuPaul's Drag Race: Makeup Tutorial	Herself	Guest	
2020	Da Fuq	Himself	Guest	
2020	The X-Change Rate	Himself	Guest	
2020	Bring Back My Ghouls	Herself	Guest	
2021	Out of the Closet	Himself	Guest	
2022	Bring Back My Girls	Herself	Guest	
2023	Unpacked with Jan Sport	Herself	Guest; Podcast	
2023	That Sounds Right	Herself	Guest; Podcast	
2023	Star Trek Day 2023	Herself	Starring; Interviewer	

=== Music videos ===
Year	Title	Artist	Ref
2022	"GAGA"	Grace Gaustad	
2023	"Say Your Name"	Mila Jam	

=== Film ===
Year	Title	Role	Notes	Ref
2024	IDENTITEAZE	Anthony	Short film	

== Discography ==
=== Singles ===
Year	Song	Ref.
2020	"You Wish!"	

=== Featured singles ===
Title	Year	Album
"I'm That Bitch" (with The Cast of RuPaul's Drag Race Season 12)	2020	non-album single
"Madonna: The Unauthorized Rusical" (with The Cast of RuPaul's Drag Race Season 12)	2020	non-album single
"I Made It / Mirror Song/ Losing Is New Winning" (Las Vegas Live Medley) (with The Cast of RuPaul's Drag Race Season 12)	2020	non-album single
"The Shady Bunch" (with The Cast of RuPaul's Drag Race Season 12)	2020	non-album single

== See also ==
- LGBTQ culture in New York City
- List of LGBT people from New York City
