= In My Feelings (disambiguation) =

"In My Feelings" is a 2018 song by Drake.

In My Feelings may also refer to:

- In My Feelings (EP), a 2018 EP by Aja
- In My Feelings (Goin' Thru It), a 2016 mixtape Boosie Badazz
- "In My Feelings", a 2014 song by Kevin Gates from Luca Brasi 2
- "In My Feelings", a 2015 mixtape by Lee Major
- "In My Feelings", a 2015 mixtape by Trevor Jackson
- "In My Feelings", a 2016 song by Nelson Freitas
- "In My Feelings", a 2017 song by Kehlani from SweetSexySavage
- "In My Feelings", a 2017 song by Lana Del Rey from Lust for Life
