= Couleé-D =

EP by Shea Couleé
- Released: June 23, 2017
- Length: 12:56

Shea Couleé chronology
Couleé-D (2017)	8 (2023)

Singles from 8
- 1. "Cocky" Released: June 3, 2017

Couleé-D is an extended play (EP) by American drag performer Shea Couleé, released on June 23, 2017. Ahead of the EP's release, music videos co-directed by Shea Couleé were released for all three songs on June 22. The collection was produced by Shea Couleé and VAM studio. Fellow RuPaul's Drag Race contestant The Vixen is featured on the track "Cocky".

== Composition and production ==
Fellow RuPaul's Drag Race contestant The Vixen (performing in 2018) is featured on "Cocky".

The visual album Couleé-D has three tracks with accompanying music videos: "Ride", "Cocky", featuring fellow RuPaul's Drag Race contestant The Vixen as well as Lila Star, and "Feeling So". She recorded a total of eleven tracks, but decided not to release a larger collection. She said, "There [are] all these different sounds and different vibes—there's also really great stuff that's unreleased that I'm holding onto because I think what I want to do is to just release smaller albums, EPs and then have visuals for all them and continue telling the stories."

According to Out's Rose Dommu, the EP "doesn't have a particular narrative' and offers "three distinct elements of Couleé’s drag persona". The videos were co-produced by Shea Couleé and the Chicago-based production company VAM, and filmed locally immediately following her appearance of RuPaul's DragCon LA.

=== Songs ===
Shea Couleé has said of the opening track, "'Ride' is the really laid back band-jam homegirl jam that she would listen to [while] smoking a blunt with your friends—just like chilling at a cookout". She said of the second song: "'Cocky' actually came about because [during Drag Race], there was a contestant that had been kinda running her mouth in the streets about me and calling me 'Cocky' after her exit. I've always prided myself on being able to maintain a sense of humility and perspective about my abilities and what it is that I can do as an artist and performer. So I was really like, 'Oh yeah girl?'"

On the origins of the EP's third and final track, Shea Couleé has recalled:

'Feeling So' was actually one of the first songs I wrote when I got back from the show and there was one night I had been out at Queen, this party on Sundays at Smartbar [in Chicago], and I was getting ready to go to this after hours and the song, 'Everybody Wants to Rule the World,' by Tears for Fear came on the radio. I was like, 'Oh my god, I forgot about this song, it's so good.' I was jamming out with my friend Jacob Bjorge, who co-wrote and produced it, and we were sitting down and he started playing the chorus. I just started writing the song and [it's] really inspired by that moment... by an amazing, drug-fueled night out on the town with that feeling that just keeps getting better and better. It's careless and fun and you're so caught up in the moment, you don't even have the words to describe how good you're feeling. You're just feeling so...

== Release and promotion ==
The EP was released unexpectedly on June 23, 2017, coinciding with the finale of the ninth season of RuPaul's Drag Race, preceded only by Out's exclusive release of the three accompanying music videos on June 22.

== Reception ==
James Besanvalle of Gay Star News said the EP and accompanying music videos, "all with very different vibes", "show a unique diversity" of Shea Couleé and "[prove] she's a triple threat – she can dance, sing and act". Out's Rose Dommu said the music videos "[cement] her as one of the most versatile, talented and hard-working queens in Drag Race herstory".

== Track listing ==
Couleé-D track listing
No.	Title	Length
1.	"Ride"	5:45
2.	"Cocky" (featuring Lila Star and The Vixen)	3:08
3.	"Feeling So"	3:58
Total length:		12:53

Track listing adapted from the Apple Store and Spotify
