= Jon Kung =

Chinese-American chef

Jonathan Kung is a Chinese-American chef based in Detroit, Michigan. They are known for their viral cooking content on TikTok and Instagram. Kung's debut cookbook Kung Food: Recipes from a Third-Culture Chinese Kitchen was released in 2023.

== Life and career ==
Kung was born in Los Angeles to parents from Hong Kong. Kung was raised in Hong Kong and Toronto. They received their bachelor's degree in creative writing and theatre from Eastern Michigan University. Kung moved to Detroit in 2007 to study law at University of Detroit Mercy School of Law. During law school Kung began to cook more often and shared their experiences in a blog. Kung began to assist chefs in Detroit, and they also worked as a cook at Gold Cash Gold, Takoi, and Standby. Eventually, they started their own food popup at Eastern Market, Kung Food, until they had to shut down due to the COVID-19 pandemic. They graduated law school never passed the Michigan bar exam, failing the first time by three points and the second time by two. They decided to shift to cooking as a career not long after.

In 2020, Kung gained a following by posting cooking videos to TikTok and Instagram. Their initial videos were "survival" recipes fit for viewers sheltering in place. Their recipes frequently combine traditional Chinese ingredients and American dishes. Their debut book Kung Food: Recipes from a Third-Culture Chinese Kitchen was released in October 2023. Kung and drag queen Kim Chi co-hosted the culture and food podcast 1 for the Table.

Kung is nonbinary and uses he/him and they/them pronouns.
