= Crown (Aja album) =

2021 album by Aja

Studio album by Aja
- Released: May 21, 2021
- Length: 46:59
- Label: AJA

Aja chronology
| Nail in the Coffin (2019) | Crown (2021) | Femme Queen Rage; Vol. 1 (2023) |

Singles from Crown
- 1. "21 Roads" Released: March 1, 2021; 2. "Tough Love" Released: April 9, 2021; 3. "Crossbow" Released: April 30, 2021

Crown (stylized in all caps) is the second studio album by rapper and entertainer Aja, released independently on May 21, 2021.

== Background and release ==
Crown follows the 2019 release of her debut studio album Box Office, as well as her collaborative Halloween-themed extended play with rapper and producer Shilow, Nail in the Coffin. The album draws from her heritage and spiritual Lukumi faith and is also inspired by her experience in the COVID-19 pandemic which she says allowed them to "re-evaluate myself, my life, my story and how I want to deliver that". Aja has said that the more vulnerable moments on the album were inspired by Billie Eilish's discussion of mental health struggles on the song "Everything I Wanted". She said that each song was inspired by a specific orisha, or deity, and used "drums, cowbells" and "songs in the traditional tongue of the Lukumi faith" to construct them before they were sent to producers to craft the album's interludes. She also said that she wanted to separate herself from other RuPaul's Drag Race alumna in order to "not just perform the art, but be the art" and break from the "template for what people expect" from the show's former contestants. The 47-minute, twenty-track album was released in May 2021 following the release of three singles (alongside their associated interludes) over a span of two months.

== Track listing ==
| No. | Title | Writer(s) | Length |
|---|---|---|---|
| 1. | "Esu Elegba Interlude: 21 Keys" | Aja Oshun; Kyle Constant | 0:58 |
| 2. | "21 Roads" (featuring Katie Jobes) | Oshun; Constant | 3:42 |
| 3. | "Ogun Interlude: Liquifying Iron" | Oshun; Constant | 0:47 |
| 4. | "Tough Love" (featuring GESS) | Oshun; Edward Gessford Jr.; Steven Slaven | 3:27 |
| 5. | "Ochosi Interlude: Loading the Bow" | Oshun; Constant | 0:52 |
| 6. | "Crossbow" | Oshun; Constant | 3:18 |
| 7. | "Obalouaye Interlude: Crying for Help" | Oshun; Constant | 0:47 |
| 8. | "Bundschu II" (featuring Shilow) | Oshun; Chance Parsons; Constant | 3:24 |
| 9. | "Shango Interlude: Dancing in the Rain" | Oshun; Constant | 1:44 |
| 10. | "Like Lightning" (featuring Regina Del Carmen and Kaya Conky) | Oshun; Parsons; Kaya Conky; Constant; Regina Del Carmen | 3:08 |
| 11. | "Obatala Interlude: Holy Rebirth" | Oshun; Constant | 1:28 |
| 12. | "White Couture" | Oshun; Parsons; Jordan Baumstark | 3:27 |
| 13. | "Obba Nani Interlude: Matrimonial Bondage" | Oshun; Constant | 1:16 |
| 14. | "Swords Down, Hearts Out" (featuring Katie Jobes) | Oshun; Constant | 3:09 |
| 15. | "Oya Interlude: Kali & Oya Dance" | Oshun; Constant | 1:16 |
| 16. | "Horsewh!p" (featuring Dai Burger) | Oshun; Dainene Alexia Baldwin; Eric Shorey; Martin D. Fowler | 3:57 |
| 17. | "Yemoja Interlude: Nigerian Water" | Oshun; Constant | 0:49 |
| 18. | "Black Ariel" (featuring Widow Von'Du, Amira Wang and Kezra Leon) | Oshun; Dorothy Miles; Kezra Leon; Ray Fry; Slaven | 4:32 |
| 19. | "Oshun Interlude: Tears of Joy" | Oshun; Constant | 1:11 |
| 20. | "Honey Drip (E' Ladé Oshun)" (featuring Amma Whatt) | Oshun; Amma Whatt; Constant | 3:40 |
| Total length: | | | 46:59 |
