= Nail in the Coffin =

EP by Aja and Shilow
- Released: September 27, 2019
- Genre: Trap
- Length: 21:29
- Label: AJA

Aja chronology
ALL CAPS (2019)	Nail in the Coffin (2019)	Crown (2021)

Singles from Nail in the Coffin
- 1. "Mama Chola" Released: August 30, 2019; 2. "The Purge" Released: September 23, 2019

Nail in the Coffin is a collaborative Halloween-themed EP by Aja and Shilow, released on September 27, 2019.

== Composition and promotion ==
The EP "[blends] emo punk, trap, country and EDM, paying homage to classic and modern horror films".

"Mama Chola", released on August 30, served as the EP's lead single, and was accompanied by a music video filmed in Kansas City. "The Purge" served as the EP's second single.

== Reception ==
NME's Jordan Bassett described the EP as "a ghoulish anthology of heavy hitting hip-hop bangers that shout-out Jason from the Friday The 13th movies and the more recent likes of The Purge". Jon Ali of Billboard described the "Halloween-meets-trap" EP as "menacingly delicious", and included "Haunted House" on his "Billboard Pride's October 2019 Playlist".

== Track listing ==
1. "The Purge" — Aja & Shilow
2. "Lost" (feat. Josh Hurst of Young Medicine) — Aja & Shilow
3. "Mama Chola" (feat. Amira Wang) — Aja & Shilow
4. "Body Count" — Shilow
5. "Haunted House" — Aja & Shilow
6. "Paranoia" — Aja
7. "Eulogy (Nail in the Coffin)" — Aja & Shilow

Track listing adapted from the iTunes Store
