= Kim Chi (drag queen) =

American drag queen

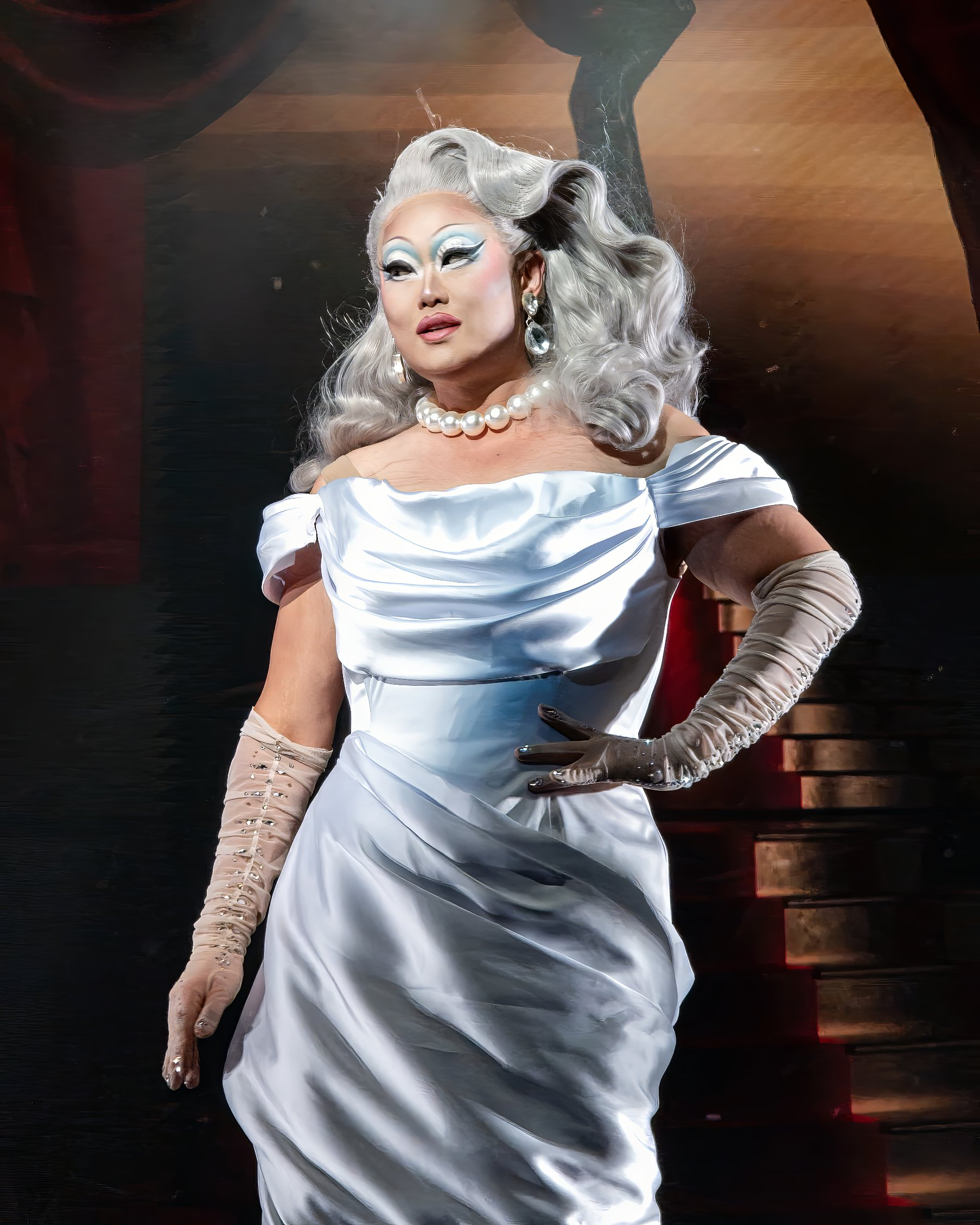
- Kim Chi performing with Werq the World 2025 at Caesars Windsor, Windsor, Ontario.
- Born: Sang-Young Shin (신상영); August 8, 1987 (age 39); United States
- Occupation: Drag queen
- Known for: RuPaul's Drag Race season 8
- Height: 1.94 m (6 ft 4 1/2 in)

Korean name
- Hangul: 신상영
- RR: Sin Sangyeong
- MR: Sin Sangyŏng
- Website: kimchithequeen.com

Sang-Young Shin (Korean: 신상영; born August 8, 1987), known professionally as Kim Chi, is an American drag queen, artist, entrepreneur, and television personality best known for competing on the eighth season of RuPaul's Drag Race. Shin was the first Korean-American contestant on the show as well as the first Korean-American drag queen on American national television. She (Note: Shin is referred to both by he/him and she/her pronouns. This article uses she/her for consistency.) owns the beauty brand Kim Chi Chic Cosmetics.

== Early life ==
Sang-Young Shin was born in the United States on August 8, 1987, and lived in both South Korea and Okemos, Michigan as a child. Her parents, who are divorced, also live in Chicago. As of 2016, Shin lived in the Andersonville neighborhood of Chicago. She attended Okemos High School. As of 2017, her mother did not know she did drag until she reached fame on TV. Shin studied graphic design in college before working as an art director and exploring sculpture, fashion design, and painting.

== Career ==
=== Early career ===
Shin began performing in drag in Chicago in 2012. She chose the stage name "Kim Chi" as a play on kimchi, the Korean dish, while also noting that it resembles a Korean woman's name. As she established herself in Chicago's drag scene, she developed a highly stylized persona inspired by anime, fashion, and Korean popular culture, characterized by elaborate makeup, sculptural costumes, and exaggerated femininity. Shin has described the character as "a live action anime character" whose fashion aesthetic could be described as "bionic doily", adding that she celebrates "all things cute, fun, weird, and exotic."

During her early years as a performer, Shin became friends with future RuPaul's Drag Race contestant Trixie Mattel and helped her secure one of her first drag bookings in Chicago after Mattel had difficulty finding work in her hometown of Milwaukee.

=== Television and film ===
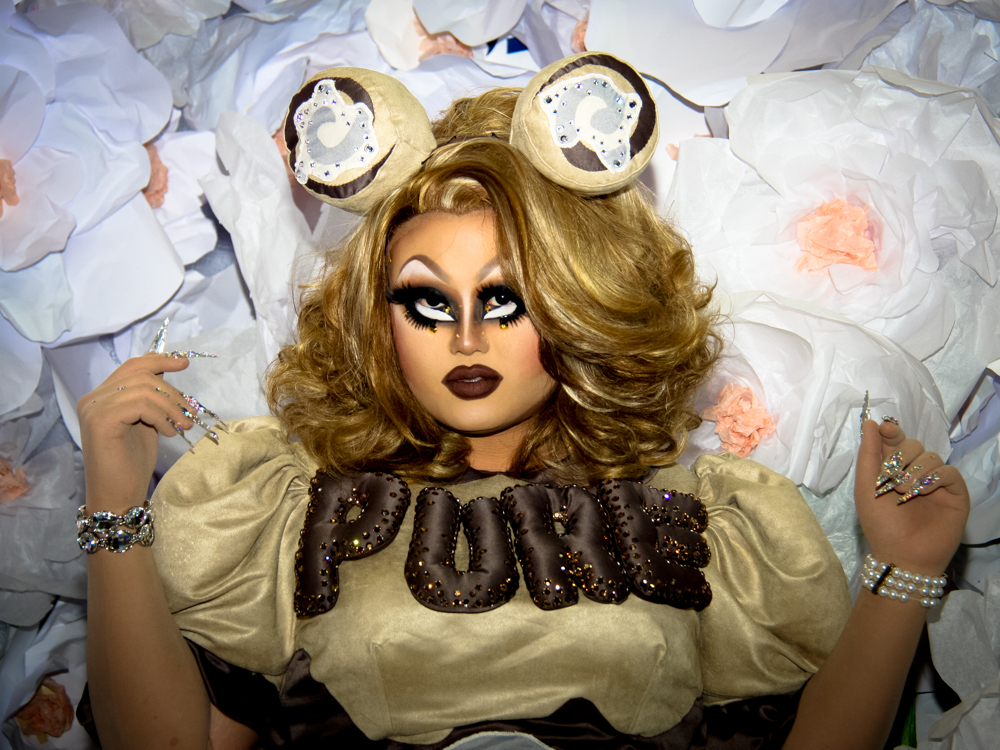
Shin in 2017

Shin gained national recognition in 2016 after competing on the eighth season of RuPaul's Drag Race, becoming the first Korean-American drag queen to compete on the series and the first Korean-American drag performer to appear on American national television. She won the season's opening challenge and sent the prize money to her mother, telling her she had earned it through makeup work. Shin advanced to the finale and finished as runner-up to Bob the Drag Queen. During the finale, she performed the original song "Fat, Fem, & Asian", written specifically for her, which addressed stereotypes surrounding race, body image, and femininity within the gay community.

Following the competition, Shin returned for several Drag Race franchise productions. She competed in the television special RuPaul's Drag Race Holi-slay Spectacular in 2018.

Outside the Drag Race franchise, Shin served as a guest judge on the drag-themed episode of the first series of Glow Up: Britain's Next Make-Up Star in 2019. She later appeared on the spin-off competition RuPaul's Celebrity Drag Race in 2020 and competed on the Hulu reality competition series Drag Me to Dinner in 2023.

In 2016, Shin appeared as Chic in the short film Lipstick City, directed by fellow drag performer Shea Couleé.

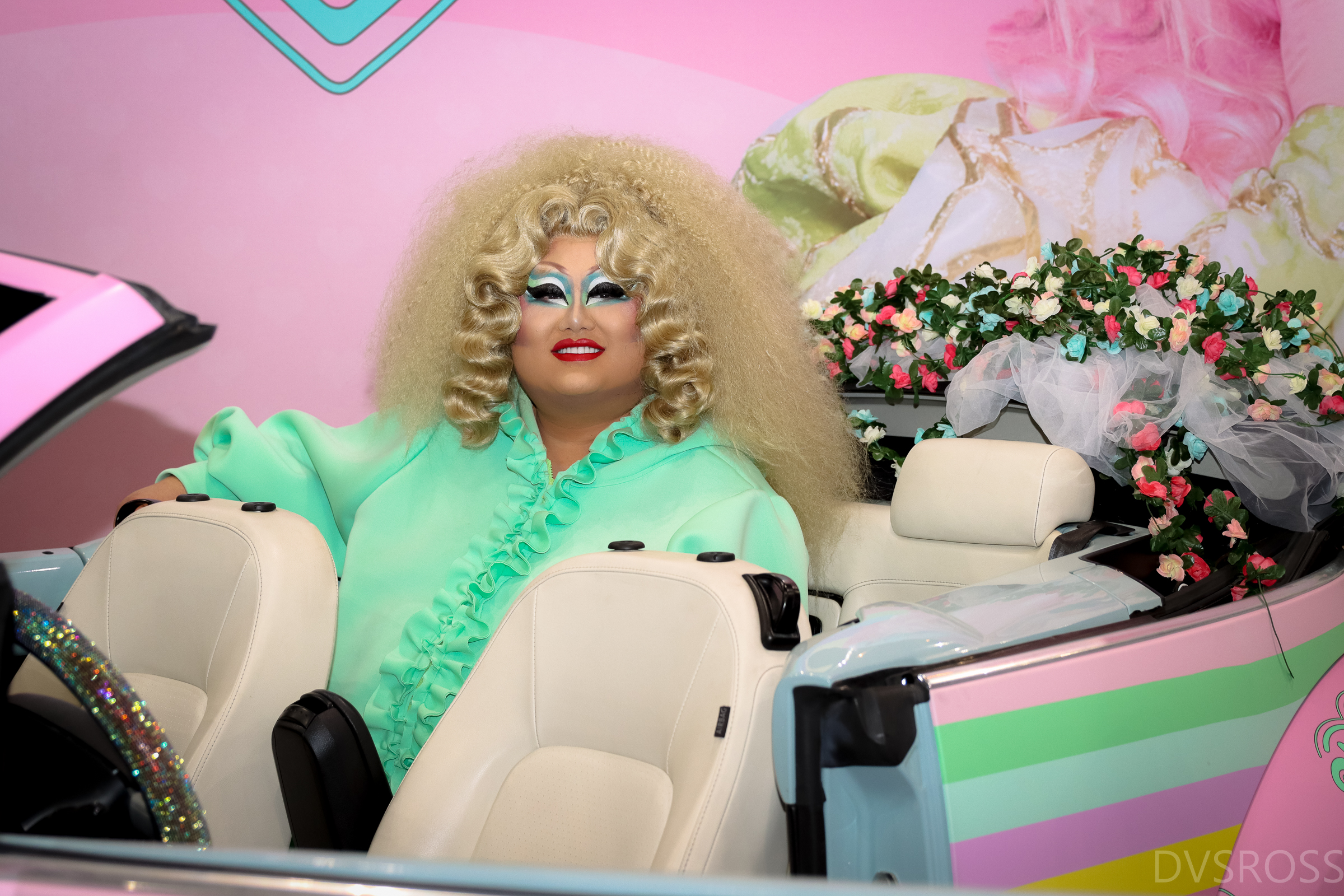
Kim Chi at RuPaul's DragCon LA in 2023

=== Live performances and public appearances ===
Following her appearance on RuPaul's Drag Race, Shin accepted speaking engagements at universities and toured internationally as a performer. In March 2017, she was invited to the Loyola Marymount University College of Communication and Fine Arts for "A Fabulous Evening With Kim Chi: Exploring Gender Identity Through Drag". She became the first drag queen to appear at the university, where she performed and participated in a question-and-answer session while in full drag.

The following month, Shin performed at the Arizona State University West campus in Phoenix, Arizona, during the university's Asian Heritage Week and Pride Week celebrations. The appearance was organized by Emily Kwon, president of the Asian-Pacific American Students' Coalition, who invited Shin to perform for students.

In May 2017, Shin joined the North American leg of the Werq the World tour, an international drag concert tour hosted by Bianca Del Rio and Michelle Visage. The tour also featured Alaska Thunderfuck, Alyssa Edwards, Detox, Latrice Royale, and Violet Chachki.

=== Business ventures ===
Following her appearance on RuPaul's Drag Race, Shin expanded into the beauty industry through cosmetics collaborations and other commercial ventures. In 2016, she partnered with Sugarpill Cosmetics to develop a collection that included Kim Chi Liquid Lip Color, a donut-scented lipstick, and Kim Chi Electric Teal Eyeshadow.

Later that year, Shin released Kimchiji, a package of emoji and stickers featuring her catchphrases and illustrations associated with her drag persona, which was made available through Apple as the Kimchiji Keyboard App and Kimchiji Sticker Pack.

Three years later, in 2019, Shin announced the launch of her own cosmetics brand, Kim Chi Chic, in collaboration with Bespoke Beauty Brands, founded by Toni Ko, the founder of NYX Cosmetics.

In 2025, Shin collaborated with Korean-American streetwear brand Sundae School to create Kim Chi Over Flowers, cannabis edible gummies flavored with vegan kimchi.

Shin published two books in 2025: a superhero graphic novel co-written with Stephan Lee, Donutella Hamachi and the Library Avengers, and a cookbook, Kim Chi Eats the World.

== Recognition ==
In June 2019, a panel of judges from New York magazine placed her 17th on their list of "the most powerful drag queens in America", a ranking of 100 former Drag Race contestants.

== Bibliography ==
- Donutella Hamachi and the Library Avengers, co-written with Stephan Lee; illustrated by Utomaru (Candlewick Press: 2025)
- Kim Chi Eats the World (Union Square & Co.: 2025)

== Discography ==
=== Singles ===
Year	Song	Ref
2016	"Single"	

== Filmography ==
=== Movies ===
Year	Title	Role	Notes	Ref(s)
2016	Lipstick City	Chic	Short film by Shea Coulee	

=== Television ===
Year	Title	Role	Notes	Ref(s)
2016	RuPaul's Drag Race (season 8)	Herself	Contestant (Runner-Up)	
2016	RuPaul's Drag Race: Untucked	Herself	9 episodes	
2016	Gay for Play Game Show Starring RuPaul	Herself	1 episode	
2018	RuPaul's Drag Race (season 10)	Herself	Guest	
2018	RuPaul's Drag Race Holi-slay Spectacular	Herself	Contestant	
2019	Glow Up: Britain's Next Make-Up Star	Herself	Guest Judge	
2020	RuPaul's Celebrity Drag Race	Herself	RuPaul's Drag Race Spin-Off	
2023	Drag Me to Dinner	Herself	Hulu original	

=== Music videos ===
Year	Title	Artist
2016	"Fantasy"	Acid Betty
2016	The Realness	RuPaul
2016	Straight Outta Oz	Todrick Hall
2016	Expensive	Todrick Hall
2017	Me4U	Danny L Harle
2018	Pose	Naomi Smalls

=== Web series ===
Year	Title	Role	Notes	Ref.
2015	Cooking w/ Drag Queens	Herself	Guest	
2016	Vanity Fair: 103 Years of Drag Queen Fashion	Herself	Vanity Fair video short	
2016	Bobbin' Around	Herself	Guest	
2016	Ring My Bell	Herself	Guest	
2017	$tranger$ for Ca$h	Herself	Guest, with Milk	
2017–2018	M.U.G.	Herself	Co-Host	
2017	PMB	Herself	Guest	
2018	Pardon My French Food	Herself	Recurring	
2019	The Pit Stop	Herself	Guest	
2019–2020	Werq the World	Herself	World of Wonder exclusive	
2019	Gaymer Guys	Herself	Guest	
2019	Runway Rewind	Herself	Guest	
2022	Binge Queens	Herself	Guest, Produced by World of Wonder	
2024	Monét's Slumber Party	Herself	Guest	
