= Love for the Arts =

- Genre: Reality competition
- Created by: Trinity the Tuck
- Judges: Trinity the Tuck
- Opening theme: "Where Are the Jokes" by Trinity the Tuck
- Country of origin: United States
- Original language: English
- No. of seasons: 1
- No. of episodes: 10

Production
- Executive producer: Trinity the Tuck
- Producers: Trinity the Tuck; Leo Llanos
- Editor: Leo Llanos
- Camera setup: Multiple
- Running time: 65 minutes
- Production company: Trinity the Tuck LLC.

Original release
- Network: Twitch
- Release: August 4 – October 6, 2020

Love for the Arts is an American international competition series created, produced and hosted by Trinity the Tuck. The show documents Trinity's search for the best drag artist. The show is all inclusive and recruits drag contestants from all drag backgrounds. Each week, contestants are given different challenges and runways while Trinity and guest judges critique contestants' progress throughout the competition.

== History ==
In 2019, Trinity started Love For The Arts as a traveling competition in cities all over the US to uplift all types of drag artists who did not have a platform. In 2020, Trinity decided to create a digital version for a reality competition which is loosely based on the original Love For The Arts tour. The digital version is more advanced in structure and concept to create a more dynamic competition setting.

== Format ==
Each episode opens with Trinity introducing herself. She then reveals the fan voting poll results for who is eliminated based on the previous episode's lip sync battle. Trinity then introduces the week's guest judges and proceeds to show the episode challenge.

=== Challenges ===
Each episode features a main challenge where each of the competitors must either act, design and create a look, or do a presentation. The performances are generally judged right after. Trinity then presents the runway.

=== Runways ===
If the challenge involves the creation of an outfit, that outfit is presented to the judges in the runway. Otherwise, a theme is assigned and the contestants must put together a look that fits the theme, which is presented to the judges. The runway looks and presentation are judged along with challenge performance.

=== Lip Sync Battles ===
The contestants selected as the bottom two must lip sync to songs previously filmed by each contestant. After the lip sync battle, Trinity opens a poll online where fans vote on who should stay in the competition. The results are then shown in the following episode.

== Judges ==
Trinity the Tuck serves as the primary judge on the show, and is the only regular judge on the panel. Each episode she is joined by a rotating cast of celebrity models, makeup artists and drag alumni including Alaska, Adore Delano, Biqtch Puddin', Landon Cider, Trinity K. Bonet, Peppermint, Manila Luzon, Shea Coulee and Vander Von Odd.

== Overview ==
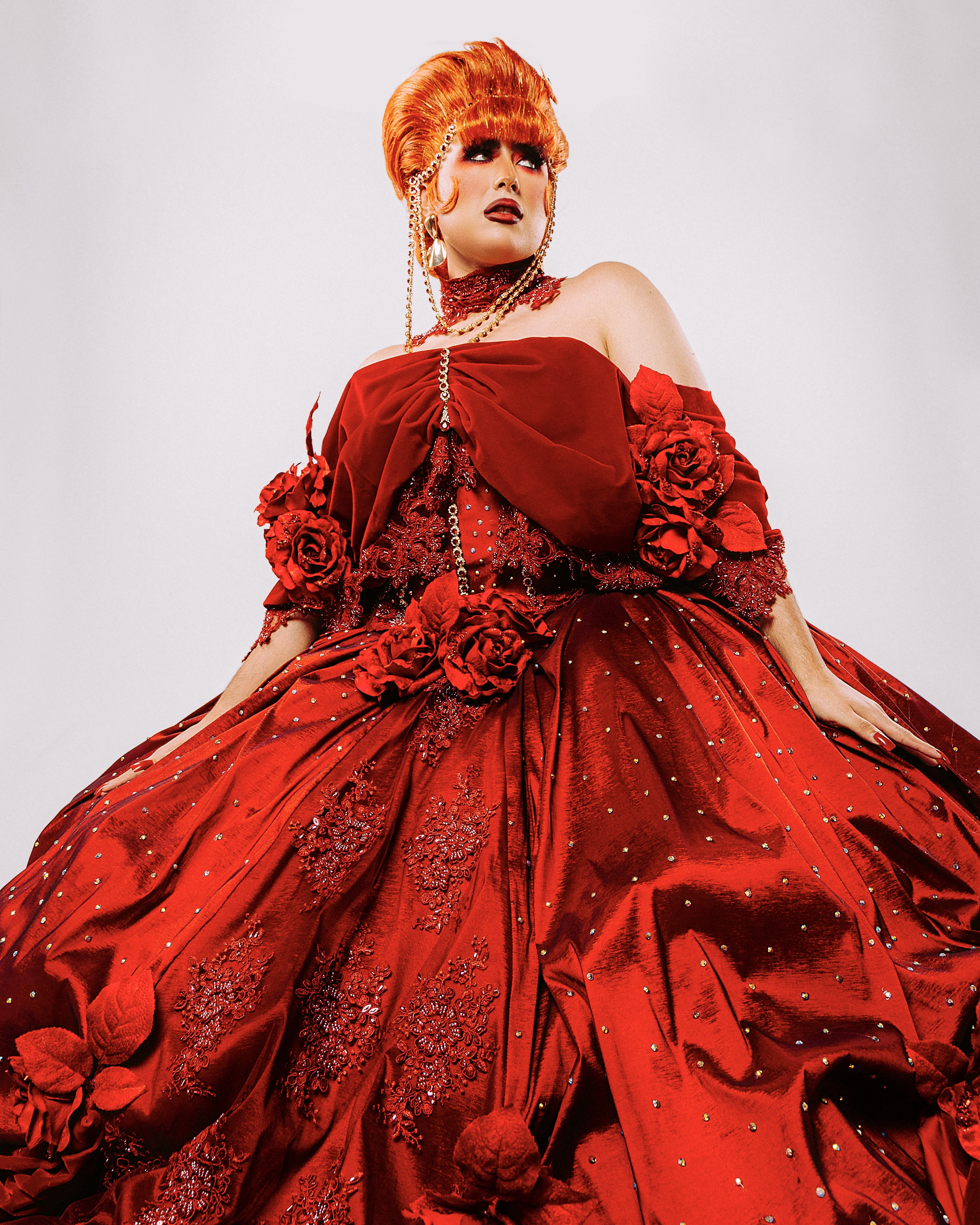
Season 1 winner Gvajardo in their royal look for the finale

Love For The Arts was officially announced via Trinity the Tuck's Instagram on July 26, 2020. The show first aired on August 4, 2020, on her Twitch channel. The performers went through an audition process in which a certain group of performers then were put through to the semi-final in which the public would vote the 10 performers to enter the competition. Originally 10 performers were cast as shown in the promo but Spikey Van Dykey quit the show. The performers compete to win custom costumes from Jeffrey Kelly Designs & Sew-excited, a "one of a kind hairstyle" from Shontelle Sparkles, custom accessories by Kalaqtic, a new brand logo by Dan Polyak, a complete make-up package from BatMe Cosmetics, a "one of a kind" custom crown by Fierce Drag Jewels and a cash prize of $5000 provided by Twitch.

== Contestants ==
Contestant	Hometown	Outcome
Gvajardo	Monterrey, Mexico	Winner
Carmen Monoxide	Guatemala City, Guatemala	Runners-up
Lesley Wolf	Bogotá, Colombia	Runners-up
Margaret Y Ya	Mexico City, Mexico	4th place
Kat Wilderness	Fort Lauderdale, Florida	5th place
Sam Star	Birmingham, Alabama	6th place
Kylee O'Hara Fatale	Dallas, Texas	7th place
Zodi	Birmingham, United Kingdom	8th place
Erica Chanel	Charlotte, North Carolina	9th place
Spikey Van Dykey	Pensacola, Florida	10th place

== Contestant progress ==
Contestant	1	2	3	4	5	6	7	8	9	10
Gvajardo	HIGH	SAFE	SAFE	HIGH	SAFE	LOW	BTM2	BTM2	Guest	Winner
Carmen Monoxide	HIGH	HIGH	HIGH	HIGH	LOW	HIGH	BTM2	SAFE	Guest	Runner-up
Lesley Wolf	HIGH	HIGH	HIGH	LOW	HIGH	SAFE	HIGH	SAFE	Guest	Runner-up
Margaret Y Ya	SAFE	LOW	BTM2	HIGH	BTM2	HIGH	SAFE	ELIM	Guest	
Kat Wilderness	SAFE	SAFE	LOW	SAFE	HIGH	BTM2	QUIT		Guest	
Sam Star	SAFE	BTM2	HIGH	ELIM		ELIM			Guest	
Kylee O'Hara Fatale	LOW	LOW	SAFE	BTM2	ELIM				Class Clown	
Zodi	BTM2	HIGH	ELIM						Guest	
Erica Chanel	BTM2	ELIM							Guest	
Spikey Van Dykey	QUIT									

Key
The contestant won Love For The Arts
The contestant was a runner-up
The contestant won the Class Clown award for best personality
The contestant received positive critiques, and was declared safe.
The contestant received critiques and was ultimately declared safe
The contestant received negative critiques but was ultimately declared safe
The contestant was in the bottom and faced the public vote
The contestant was in the bottom but did not face the public vote due to another contestant quitting
The contestant was eliminated
The contestant returned to the competition and was eliminated in the same episode
The contestant quit the competition

== Episodes ==
No.	Title	Original release date
1	"Lights, Camera, Drag"	August 4, 2020
The contestants were challenged to perform all the roles from a movie scene of their own choice. This challenge was based around how well they could act as well as their comedy skills. On the runway the theme was Creature Feature where the contestants had to showcase a look from a creature of film. In the end, it was Erica and Zodi who landed in the bottom for having the least entertaining challenge videos as well as the least impressive runways.: Guest Judge: Biqtch Puddin'; Challenge: Perform all roles in a movie scene of their choice; Runway Theme: Creature Feature; Bottom Two: Erica Chanel and Zodi; Lip Sync Songs: Erica Chanel: "I Care" by Beyoncé; Zodi: "Plastic Doll" by Lady Gaga; Eliminated: none
2	"Sew You Think You Can Drag"	August 11, 2020
Due to Spikey dropping out from the competition, Trinity announced that despite the voting, neither Erica nor Zodi would be leaving the competition. The contestants were challenged to design a look out of an unconventional material of their choice and then serve it for their runway. On the runway, the contestants all modeled their unconventional materials outfits. While Margaret and Kylee each received low scores for technical issues it was Sam and Erica who landed in the bottom for having less impressive outfits than the rest.: Guest Judge: Peppermint and Trinity K. Bonet; Challenge: Design a look out of an unconventional material; Runway Theme: Unconventional Materials; Bottom Two: Erica Chanel and Sam Star; Lip Sync Songs: Erica Chanel: "Flaws and All" by Beyoncé; Sam Star: "Boss Bitch" by Doja Cat; Eliminated: Erica Chanel
3	"The Tuck Cooking Network"	August 18, 2020
Trinity announced that Erica lost the voting and was eliminated. The contestants were challenged to create an original cooking show episode. On the runway the theme was Divine Decades where the contestants chose a decade in history and showcased a look that represented that decade. In the end, Margaret and Zodi landed in the bottom for having the least entertaining cooking episodes with Kat having a low but safe critique.: Guest Judge: Halessia and The Drag Photographer; Challenge: Create an original cooking show episode; Runway Theme: Divine Decades; Bottom Two: Margaret Y Ya and Zodi; Lip Sync Songs: Margaret Y Ya: "Say So" by Doja Cat; Zodi: "Not So Bad in LA" by Allie X; Eliminated: Zodi
4	"Drag Me Up"	August 25, 2020
Trinity announced that Zodi lost the voting and was eliminated. The contestants were challenged to create a beauty influencer makeup tutorial. On the runway the theme was 7 Deadly Sins where each contestants was randomly assigned a sin to interpret in the runway. In the end, both Kylee and Sam landed in the bottom for having less entertaining tutorials than the rest while Lesley had a low but safe critique.: Guest Judge: Manila Luzon; Challenge: Create a beauty influencer makeup tutorial.; Runway Theme: 7 Deadly Sins; Bottom Two: Kylee O'Hara Fatale and Sam Star; Lip Sync Songs: Kylee O'Hara Fatale: "Move Your Body" by Sia; Sam Star: "Man! I Feel Like a Woman!" by Shania Twain; Eliminated: Sam Star
5	"Video Vixens"	September 1, 2020
Trinity announced that Sam lost the voting and was eliminated. The contestants were challenged to choose a genre of music and create a music video in their own unique style of drag. On the runway the theme was Brilliant Blues where the contestants had to showcase a look that represented the color blue. In the end, Margaret landed in the bottom since she recreated a music video shot by shot instead of doing it in her own style. Due to having lower quality in her music video, Kylee also landed in the bottom. At some point after the end of the episode, a surprise stream was broadcast showing grainy footage of Trinity announcing that Margaret won the voting poll between her and Kylee. In a surprise twist it was also shown that one of the eliminated artists would be returning to the competition that night and would be announced the following episode.: Guest Judge: Jonysios; Challenge: Choose a genre of music and create a music video using their own drag persona.; Runway Theme: Brilliant Blues; Bottom Two: Kylee O'Hara Fatale and Margaret Y Ya; Lip Sync Songs: Kylee O'Hara Fatale: "Fences" by Paramore; Margaret Y Ya: "One Of Us" by ABBA; Eliminated: Kylee O'Hara Fatale
6	"Drag Commodities"	September 8, 2020
Prior to the start of the episode, footage from the surprise stream showed that Margaret won the voting poll from the last episode between her and Kylee. It was also shown that one of the eliminated artists would be returning. Once the episode started, footage from the week prior was shown where Trinity did a random drawing, revealing Sam as the returning artist out of the previously eliminated contestants. In this week's challenge, the contestants were challenged to take an existing product and completely reinvent and sell it as something new in a commercial designed by them. The runway was Villains En Vogue, where the contestants had to create a look from an original villain they created but also make it fashion. Since Kat did not change the original product name and using footage from existing commercials she landed in the bottom. Sam also landed in the bottom for having a less entertaining and lower quality commercial. While Gvajardo did have a low critique for challenge and runway issues, they were safe from the bottom 2.: Guest Judge: Landon Cider; Challenge: Create a new product and sell it in a commercial; Runway Theme: Villains En Vogue; Bottom Two: Kat Wilderness and Sam Star; Lip Sync Songs: Kat Wilderness : "Boy" By Little Mix, "Bills, Bills, Bills" by Destiny's Child; Sam Star: "Shut Up And Drive" by Rihanna; Eliminated: Sam Star, Kat Wilderness
7	"Drag Jokers"	September 15, 2020
Trinity announced that Sam lost the voting and was eliminated. She also announced that for personal reasons, Kat had to drop out of the competition. For this week's challenge the contestants were challenged to create a video where they had to do pranks on family, friends or fans. On the runway the theme was Gone With The Wind, Girl where each contestant had to showcase a look that embodied the wind element on the runway. In the end, both Carmen and Gvajardo landed in the bottom for having less entertaining challenges than the rest.: Guest Judge: Vander Von Odd; Challenge: Drag Jokesters; Runway Theme: Gone With The Wind, Girl; Bottom Two: Carmen Monoxide and Gvajardo; Lip Sync Songs: Carmen Monoxide: "Ponte Perra" by Pabllo Vittar; Gvajardo: "Arrasando" by Thalía; Eliminated: none
8	"Drag Jokers"	September 22, 2020
Trinity announced that due to Kat dropping out from the competition in the episode prior, she would save both Carmen and Gvajardo from elimination. For this week, the contestants were challenged to choose create a Super Bowl Halftime performance of one well known artist and present it as if it were a live event at the Super Bowl. On the runway the theme was Let's Get Glam where the contestants had to showcase a look that read as high glam. While Lesley had a great critique between the guest judges, she was also low critiqued by Trinity and ultimately she was safe from the bottom 2. In the end, Gvajardo landed in the bottom for not embodying Selena's energy in the performance while Margaret landed in the bottom for showing audience reactions that are not true to the Halftime show.: Guest Judge: Isis King and Shea Couleé; Challenge: Quarantine Super Bowl Halftime Show; Runway Theme: Let's Get Glam; Bottom Two: Gvajardo and Margaret Y Ya; Lip Sync Songs: Margaret y Ya: "Slow Down" by Selena Gomez; Gvajardo: "Narcicista por Excelencia" by Panda; Eliminated: Margaret y Ya
9	"The Pre Finale"	September 29, 2020
Trinity showed lip syncs from each of the cast members that were a part of the competition from the beginning. Towards the end, Trinity announced that a prestigious Class Clown award was given to Kylee O'Hara Fatale for having had the best personality in the show. Trinity then announced that Margaret lost the voting poll resulting in Carmen, Gvajardo and Lesley going on to the finale.: Class Clown: Kylee O'Hara Fatale
10	"Grand Finale"	October 6, 2020
Prior to showing the challenge, Trinity explained to the guest judges and the viewers the reason and history for choosing the challenges for the finale. Prior to making it big as a drag superstar, Trinity talked about the challenges she faced due to not having a mentor who could guide her in the oftentimes harsh landscape of the entertainment industry. This inspired her to cultivate a strong relationship with each of the contestants in the competition to help guide them. In this final episode she created 2 challenges that can better prepare them for the road ahead should they win. The first was a professional one on one skype interview with Dallas Dixon of ET Canada. The second was a photography go see with a local professional photographer in their home city. Each challenge was created to better see how each artist handles themselves in real life scenarios with people in the entertainment industry. While Carmen dominated the interview challenge, Gvajardo was oftentimes long winded with her responses. In the photography go see, Gvajardo flourished, showing her great eye for being a creative director as well as following instructions from her photographer very well. Carmen did very well despite having personal issues getting to set. Lesley was criticized by the judges for having a garment that didn't fit the theme of royalty as well as her competitors. For the Runway, the theme was High Drag. Carmen did very well but had technical critiques for having some problems in her look. Gvajardo was praised highly for having a look that was beautiful as well as paying homage to her Mexican culture. Lesley was judged for having a look that didn't show an elevated concept as much as her competitor but was praised for shooting her look in a busy portion of her city. In the final lip sync, the contestants were to lip sync to a song that expressed who they are as an artist or to show a lip sync that had an emotional connection. During the lip sync, Trinity and the judges cast their vote on who the winner was. After the lip sync, Trinity invited the 3 finalist into the live and began a countdown to show the winner which ended with Gvajardo as the reigning drag superstar of the first season of Love For The Arts.: Guest Judge: Alaska and Aurora Sexton; Challenge 1: Professional interview with Dallas Dixon of ET Canada; Challenge 2: Professional Photography go see in their home city; Runway Theme: High Drag; Lip Sync Songs: Carmen Monoxide: "Get Outta My Way" by Kylie Minogue; Gvajardo: "Titanium" by David Guetta; Lesley Wolf: "What's Up" by 4 Non Blondes; Runners-ups: Carmen Monoxide and Lesley Wolf; Winner: Gvajardo
