= Shea Couleé =

American entertainer (born 1989)

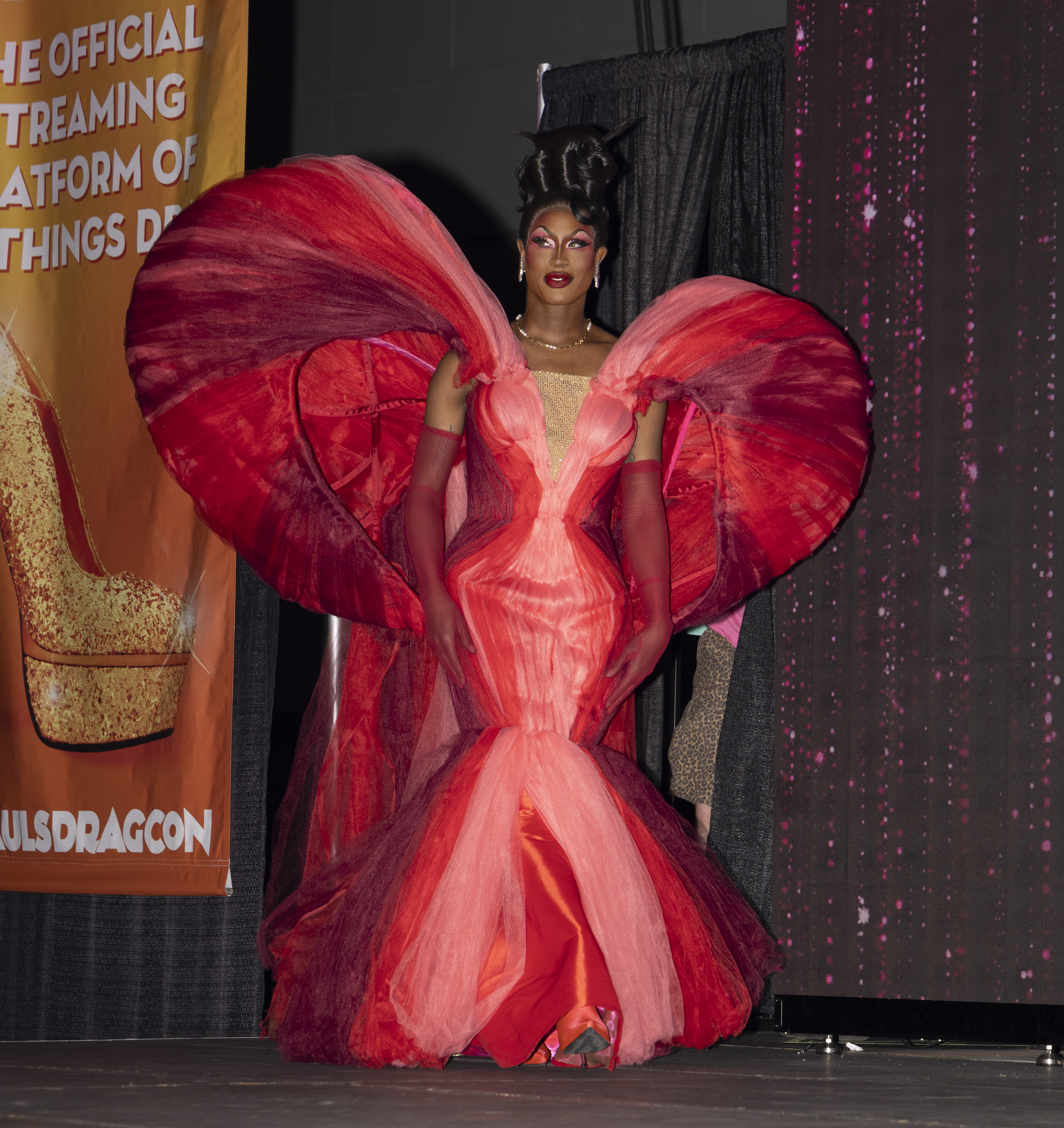
- Shea Couleé at RuPaul's DragCon LA, 2024
- Born: Jaren Kyei Merrell; February 8, 1989 (age 37); Warsaw, Indiana, U.S.
- Education: Columbia College Chicago (BFA)
- Occupations: Drag queen; singer; rapper; actor; dancer; podcaster
- Years active: 2012–present
- Known for: RuPaul's Drag Race (season 9); RuPaul's Drag Race All Stars (season 5); RuPaul's Drag Race All Stars (season 7)
- Musical career
- Genres: Pop; R&B
- Instrument: Vocals
- Label: Haus Down
- Website: sheacoulee.com

Jaren Kyei Merrell (born February 8, 1989), known professionally as Shea Couleé, is an American drag queen, singer, rapper, actor, dancer, and podcaster. Born in Warsaw, Indiana, they began their drag career in 2012. In 2017, Shea Couleé achieved international fame after competing on season nine of RuPaul's Drag Race, placing in the top four. In 2020, Shea Couleé won the fifth season of RuPaul's Drag Race All Stars. Shea Couleé later returned to compete on the all-winners seventh season of RuPaul's Drag Race All Stars in 2022, once again placing in the top four.

In 2016, Shea Couleé co-produced, directed, wrote, and starred in Lipstick City. In 2017, Shea Couleé released their debut EP, Couleé-D, along with accompanying music videos. Since then, Shea Couleé has continued their musical career, starred in their web series, podcast, and has embarked on domestic and international tours, including Werq the World, Haters Roast, and A Drag Queen Christmas.

== Early life and education ==
Merrell was born to William and Marilyn Elaine Merrell in Warsaw, Indiana and raised in Plainfield, Illinois. The youngest of five children, their mother was a minister. Their father died on January 31, 2017. Merrell has performed in theater since the age of nine. They graduated with a degree in costume design from Columbia College Chicago in 2011. In their sophomore year, they were cast in Ten Square. During their senior year at Columbia, they were the lead designer on Shakespeare's The Winter's Tale.

== Career ==
=== RuPaul's Drag Race ===
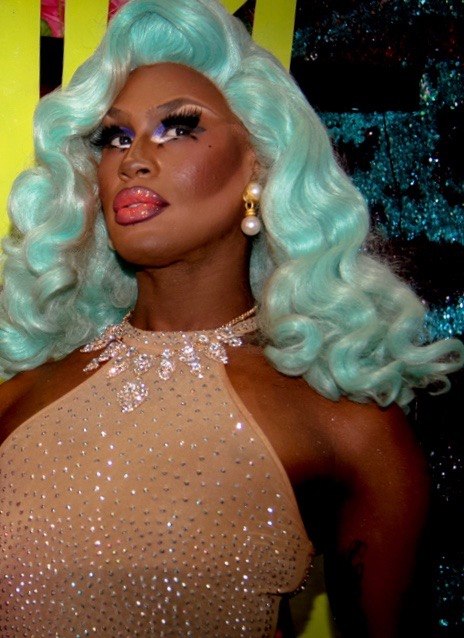
Shea Couleé in 2017

After auditioning five times, every year since they started doing drag Shea Couleé became one of 14 queens to compete on the ninth season of RuPaul's Drag Race. After portraying Naomi Campbell in the Snatch Game challenge, Campbell tweeted Shea Couleé in approval. Shea Couleé won their first challenge in the fourth episode, alongside Sasha Velour. They again won the following episode, portraying Blac Chyna for "Kardashians: The Musical". Shea Couleé won another challenge in the ninth episode, "Your Pilot's On Fire", again alongside Sasha Velour. In the following episode, "Makeover: Crew Better Work", Shea Couleé lip synced for their life against Nina Bo'nina Brown, sending her home to Demi Lovato's "Cool for the Summer". Shea Couleé won once again during the season's "Gayest Ball Ever", after creating a look inspired by the Village People's "construction worker".

In the season's finale, the final four queens all participated in a "lip sync for the crown", a new format for the show. Shea Couleé was selected to lipsync against Sasha Velour, to Whitney Houston's "So Emotional", but lost. They ultimately placed in joint third/fourth place. Shea Couleé's loss was met with controversy, with many people claiming that she should have won the crown. Shea Couleé themself responded to the controversy, defending Velour's win, and saying "Ultimately Sasha was more successful than myself and the other girls."

On May 8, 2020, Shea Couleé was announced as a contestant on the fifth series of RuPaul's Drag Race All Stars. They won the second episode, lipsyncing for their legacy against Lipsync Assassin Alyssa Edwards to The Pointer Sisters' Neutron Dance and winning, earning a $20,000 cash prize. Shea Couleé won again during the Snatch Game of Love challenge on episode five, portraying Flavor Flav. They lipsynced against Vanessa Vanjie Mateo to Madonna's "Open Your Heart" and won. On the grand finale episode, Shea Couleé, along with fellow finalists Jujubee and Miz Cracker, recorded, danced, and performed a verse in RuPaul's "Clapback", choreographed by Todrick Hall. After lipsyncing to Janelle Monae's "Make Me Feel", Shea Couleé was announced as the winner of All Stars 5.

In April 2022, Shea Couleé was announced as one of the eight returning winners that would be competing in seventh season of RuPaul's Drag Race All Stars, the first ever all-winners season of Drag Race. Throughout the competition, they won the first and eleventh challenges, and ultimately finished in 3rd/4th place.

=== Music and continued career ===
In 2016, Shea Couleé was photographed for Glossed and Found magazine. In May 2017, Shea Couleé performed as part of the Werq the World 2017 tour. Hosted by Bianca Del Rio and Michelle Visage, the tour featured drag queens Alaska Thunderfuck, Alyssa Edwards, Detox, Latrice Royale, and Violet Chachki. Shea Couleé co-produced, directed, and starred in their own film Lipstick City in July 2017. Shea Couleé also released three music videos to promote their debut EP, Couleé-D. They co-directed the music videos, and co-produced the EP. Azealia Banks and Shea Couleé announced plans to release a studio collaboration. The collaboration never came to fruition after Banks ghosted Shea Couleé.

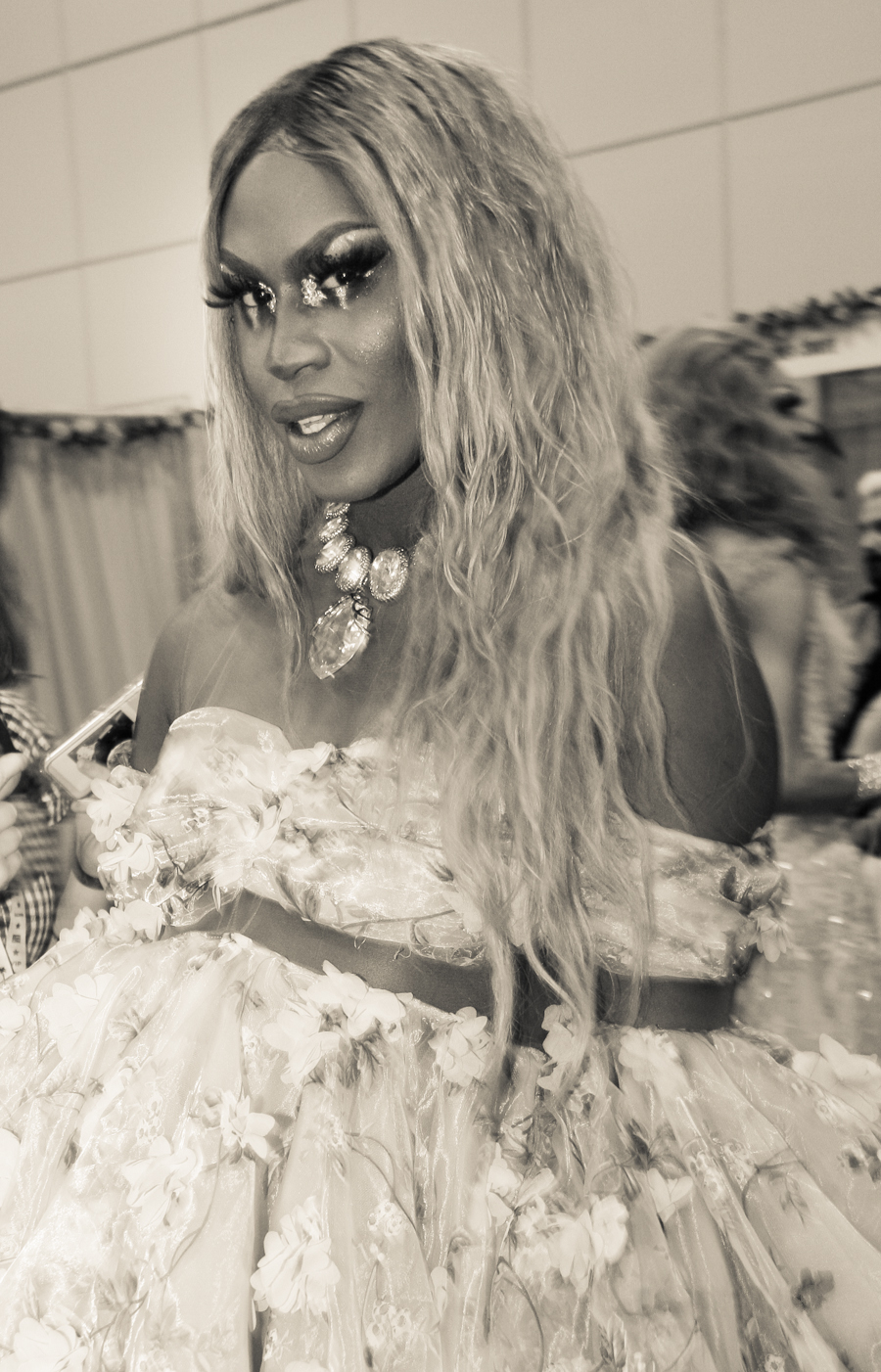
Shea Couleé in 2018

At one point, they were asked to perform as a dancer in a burlesque show "Jeezy's Juke Joint". After an email mishap, they ended up performing a solo act for the show, their first time in drag. They have performed at various venues in Chicago, including Roscoe's, Berlin, Double Door, and Hydrate. They also worked as a resident host at Smart Bar, and was a Co-Host for the Tony Soto Show. At one point, Shea Couleé competed in Miss Roscoe's Pageant. Before doing drag full-time, Shea Couleé also worked part-time as a sales associate and customer service representative for an adult store, Tulip. In April, Shea Couleé was featured in Peppermint's Too Funky music video. In April 2018, Shea Couleé premiered Call Me Couleé, a web series documenting their life post Drag Race. The series lasted six episodes, concluding on October 18, 2018. In September 2018, Shea Couleé performed as a background dancer for Christina Aguilera for Opening Ceremony's Spring 2019 collection, alongside other Drag Race alumni. They were photographed with Farrah Moan for Manny MUA's Lunar Beauty palette. In June 2018, Shea Couleé and Drag Race alum Asia O'Hara and Monét X Change performed in The Vixen's Black Girl Magic, a drag show created to showcase the talent of black queens. In November, Shea Couleé was featured as a part of Lush's "Merry DRAGMas" Campaign, alongside Detox and Kim Chi. In March 2019, they appeared in the music video for Iggy Azalea's "Sally Walker". The same month, they joined the Drag World UK lineup, which began touring in June. In May, they were photographed with Farrah Moan and Violet Chachki for Huda Beauty's new Setting Spray.

On May 18, Shea Couleé re-released their song "Creme Brulee" as well as an accompanying music video. The song is inspired by other female rappers such as Lil' Kim, Nicki Minaj, and Azealia Banks. The song was originally written in 2013 and was the first song Shea Couleé ever wrote. Billboard named "Creme Brulee" as the best Drag Music Video of 2018. In September, Shea Couleé released "Gasoline" a collaboration with Eddie Gessford, known professionally as GESS, who produced, co-wrote, and featured credit on the track. A month later in June, National Selfie Day, Shea Couleé was featured in Shawn Hollenbach's track "Double Filter Face", along with an accompanying music video. On July 15, Shea Couleé released "Rewind", a collaborative song with them and GESS. The following month, they released a music video for the song, directed by Sam Bailey. The song is about Shea Couleé's former boyfriend who suffered from bipolar disorder and committed suicide.

Shea Couleé was one of the Inspirations for Sina Grace's character of Shade, Marvel's first drag queen superhero. Shea Couleé has embarked on several world tours following their success on Drag Race including headlining the "War on the Catwalk" and "A Drag Queen Christmas", among others. Shea Couleé was added to the Drag Race "Haters Roast: The Shady Tour" comedy tour with other Drag Race alumni in 2019. They also headlined a one-woman show in 2019, entitled "Couleé With A 'C'". An autobiographical show, it combined song, story, and comedy, revolving around their upbringing and how they got into drag. Shea Couleé's makeup and look transformations have been featured in publications such as Cosmopolitan. In October, Shea Couleé published their first article for Metro. In January 2020, Shea Couleé attended the first ever RuPaul's DragCon UK. In March 2020, Shea Couleé performed alongside fellow drag race alumni BeBe Zahara Benet, Bob The Drag Queen, Mo Heart, Peppermint, and The Vixen in the Nubia tour. The tour began its run with sold-out shows in New York City, and has plans to visit Los Angeles, as well as other major cities across the United States.

In May 2020, Shea Couleé announced the release of Shea Coul-Alé, a beer in collaboration with DoStuff Media and Goose Island Brewery as a part of their Drag a Beer campaign. A portion of all the profits went to an organization that supports individuals within the LGBTQ community. The following year, they launched another limited-edition beer with Goose Island, Shea Coul-Alé: Royal Edition, with an updated flavor palate, as well as their own exclusive burger.

In October 2020, Shea Couleé was featured on the cover of Out magazine, recreating Cindy Crawford and k.d. Lang's iconic Vanity Fair cover. Later that month, they were a featured performer in Rihanna's Savage X Fenty Fashion Show Vol. 2. In November, Shea Couleé was recognised with the GAY TIMES Honour for Drag Hero at the fourth annual GAY TIMES Honours. They also featured as one of the cover stars for the magazine's Honours edition. In May 2021, Shea Couleé launched Wanna Be On Top?, a biweekly podcast themed around America's Next Top Model and discussing its impact on the art of drag. In an interview with The Advocate, Shea Couleé announced that for the past three years, they have been working on an album.

Shea Couleé currently has over 1.5 million Instagram followers and is one of the few black Drag Race queens to reach the milestone. In May 2021, they were signed to United Talent Agency. In June 2021, Shea Couleé made a guest appearance in Dragging the Classics: The Brady Bunch, a RuPaul's Drag Race and The Brady Bunch crossover, where they played the role of Marcia Brady.

In August 2021, Shea Couleé released "$100,000 bar", their own brand of bar soap in collaboration with The Quiet Girl Shoppe, a female, Black-owned business. Later that month, they were a featured performer and host in Klub Kids London Presents: NOIR: The Tour, where 25% of the proceeds from the production will be donated to the Black Lives Matter movement. In October, they performed with Heels of Hell through their eight-city Halloween tour.

In February 2022, Shea Couleé collaborated with Green Monké to produce their own Cannabis-infused Soda drinks.

In August 2022, they were cast as Slug in the Marvel Cinematic Universe Disney+ television series Ironheart.

== Activism ==
Queens of color are less celebrated than our white counterparts. But that's life, we have to work twice as hard to get half the recognition.

— Couleé, in an interview with Billboard

Shea Couleé has said it is important to them to use their career in drag to inspire people. In an interview with Seattle Gay Scene, they said, "I would say the influence I would like to have on the queer community would be to inspire people—specifically queer POC—to feel comfortable in themselves and their identities, to understand that they're special, they're amazing, and that anything you want or dream about, you deserve it." They have been particularly outspoken about racial equality, especially within the RuPaul's Drag Race fandom and drag community. In October 2018, Shea Couleé interviewed The Vixen about racism in America for the UK's Black History Month edition of Gay Times. In another interview with Gay Times UK, Shea Couleé discusses the importance of supporting and uplifting trans women of color.

Shea Couleé has spoken against President Donald Trump. Specifically, in reaction to Trump's potential policy eliminating transgender recognition, they wrote:

"Dear Trump: You don't tell women what to do with their bodies. You don't get to define gender. You don't have the qualifications to do so. You don't have a spine. You don't have a clue. We won't take this lying down. November is coming. Look how orange you fucking look girl."

Continuing their political activism, Shea Couleé endorsed presidential candidate Elizabeth Warren, and spoke at Warren's DragCon NYC booth, encouraging people to vote for her in the 2020 United States presidential election. They also marched alongside Warren at the Las Vegas Pride Parade. In 2020, Shea Couleé participated and spoke at the Drag March for Change in support for the Black Lives Matter movement. Shea Couleé has also vocally shown their support and solidarity for the Palestinian people and advocated for a free Palestine during the Gaza war.

== Personal life ==
Merrell is gay and non-binary, preferring singular they pronouns when out of drag and goes by she and her while in drag. At one point, Merrell suffered from bulimia. In 2018, Merrell received corrective dental surgery, something they wanted since they were a teenager.

Shea Couleé adopted three drag daughters: Kenzie Couleé, Bambi-Banks Couleé (since 2018), and Khloe Couleé, whom they publicly announced as their newest drag daughter on June 12, 2020. As of September 2025, Kenzie, Bambi, and Khloe have left Shea's drag house, Maison Couleé Shea Couleé has named Naomi Campbell, Grace Jones, Beyoncé, Michael Jackson, Josephine Baker, Diana Ross, and Stevie Wonder as personal icons and influences.

== Discography ==
Shea Couleé discography
- Studio albums: 1
- EPs: 1
- Singles: 10

=== Albums ===
| Title | Details | Ref |
|---|---|---|
| 8 | Released: February 24, 2023; Label: HausDown; Formats: digital download | |

=== EPs ===
| Title | Details | Ref |
|---|---|---|
| Couleé-D | Released: June 23, 2017; Label: self-released; Formats: digital download | |

=== Singles ===
==== As lead artist ====
| Song | Year | Album |
|---|---|---|
| "Crème Brûlée" | 2018 | Non-album singles |
| "Gasoline" (with GESS) | 2018 | Non-album singles |
| "Brand New" | 2019 | Non-album singles |
| "Rewind" (with GESS) | 2019 | Non-album singles |
| "Collide" (with GESS featuring Mykki Blanco) | 2020 | 8 |
| "Your Name" | 2022 | 8 |
| "Let Go" | 2022 | 8 |
| "Xmas Time" | 2022 | Non-album singles |
| "Sleigh My Name" (Remix) (with Priyanka, Alaska Thunderfuck, and Lemon) | 2022 | Non-album singles |
| "Material" | 2023 | 8 |

==== As featured artist ====
| Title | Year | Album | Ref(s) |
|---|---|---|---|
| "Category Is" (RuPaul featuring The Cast of RuPaul's Drag Race, Season 9) | 2018 | Non-album single | |
| "R U Mad (John "J-C" Carr & Bill Colemax Mix)" (Michael Blume featuring Shea Couleé and Peppermint) | 2018 | Cynicism & Sincerity | |
| "Symphony" (GESS featuring Shea Couleé) | 2018 | Plastic City | |
| "Snooze" (Big Dipper featuring Shea Couleé) | 2018 | Late Bloomer | |
| "Room, Pt. 2" (The Vixen featuring Shea Couleé) | 2018 | Non-album single | |
| "Breakfast at Tiffany's" (Aja featuring Shea Couleé) | 2019 | Box Office | |
| "Double Filter Face" (Shawn Hollenbach featuring Shea Couleé) | 2019 | Non-album single | |
| "I'm in Love" (with the Cast of RuPaul's Drag Race All Stars, Season 5) | 2020 | Non-album single | |
| "Clap Back" (RuPaul featuring the Cast of RuPaul's Drag Race All Stars, Season 5) | 2020 | Non-album single | |
| "Winner Winner (Chicken Dinner Remix)" (Yvie Oddly and Brad Kemp featuring Bebe Zahara Benet & Shea Couleé) | 2021 | Non-album single | |
| "Bad Juju" (Jujubee featuring Shea Couleé) | 2021 | Back For More | |
| "Trinity Ruins Christmas" (Trinity the Tuck featuring Shea Couleé) | 2021 | Non-album single | |
| "Legends" (Cast Version) (RuPaul featuring the cast of RuPaul's Drag Race All Stars, season 7) | 2022 | Non-album single | |
| "Titanic" (MSTR) (The cast of RuPaul's Drag Race All Stars, season 7) | 2022 | Non-album single | |

== Filmography ==
=== Movies ===
| Year | Title | Role | Notes | Ref |
|---|---|---|---|---|
| 2016 | Lipstick City | Mrs. Couleé / Shea | Writer / Producer | |
| 2020 | Savage X Fenty Show Vol. 2 | themselves | Fashion special | |
| 2020 | Nubia Amplified | themselves | One-hour special | |

=== Television ===
| Year | Title | Role | Ref(s) |
|---|---|---|---|
| 2015–16 | You're So Talented | Shea | |
| 2017 | RuPaul's Drag Race (season 9) | Contestant (3rd Place) | |
| 2017 | Breakfast Television Toronto | Guest | |
| 2017 | WGN-TV | Guest | |
| 2018 | Hey Qween! | Guest | |
| 2018 | Windy City Live | Guest | |
| 2020 | RuPaul's Drag Race All Stars (season 5) | Contestant (Winner) | |
| 2020 | RuPaul's Drag Race All Stars: Untucked (season 2) | Contestant (Winner) | |
| 2021 | Watch What Happens Live with Andy Cohen | Guest | |
| 2021 | Dragging the Classics: The Brady Bunch | Marcia Brady | |
| 2021 | Finesse | Kizer | |
| 2021 | The Bachelorette (season 17) | Guest | |
| 2021 | RuPaul's Drag Race All Stars (season 6) | Guest | |
| 2022 | Nubia Amplified: The Series | Panelist | |
| 2022 | The Kelly Clarkson Show | Guest | |
| 2022 | The View | Guest | |
| 2022 | RuPaul's Drag Race All Stars (season 7) | Contestant (3rd Place) | |
| 2022 | RuPaul's Drag Race All Stars: Untucked (season 4) | Contestant (3rd Place) | |
| 2022 | Countdown to All Stars 7: You're a Winner Baby | Herself | |
| 2023 | It's Ok to Ask Questions | Guest appearance | |
| 2024 | Abbott Elementary | Lisa Condo | |
| 2024 | Canada's Drag Race | Herself | |
| 2025 | Ironheart | Slug | |

=== Music videos ===
==== As lead artist ====
| Year | Title | Notes | Ref(s) |
|---|---|---|---|
| 2017 | "Cocky" (feat. The Vixen and Lila Star) | | |
| 2017 | "Feeling So" | | |
| 2017 | "Ride" | | |
| 2018 | "Crème Brûlée" | | |
| 2019 | "Double Filter Face" | Co-credited with Shawn Hollenbach | |
| 2019 | "Rewind" | | |
| 2020 | "Room" | Co-credited with The Vixen | |
| 2020 | "Collide" | OnlyFans exclusive | |
| 2022 | "Bad Juju" | Co-credited with Jujubee | |
| 2022 | "Let Go & Your Name" | Also director | |

==== Featured and cameo roles ====
| Year | Title | Artist | Role | Ref(s) |
|---|---|---|---|---|
| 2017 | "Too Funky" | Peppermint | Cameo | |
| 2019 | "Sally Walker" | Iggy Azalea | Feature | |
| 2020 | "Always" | Waze & Odyssey | Cameo | |
| 2020 | "Cum" | Brooke Candy ft. Iggy Azalea | Cameo | |
| 2021 | "Bubblegum Brain" | Ellise | Feature | |

=== Internet series ===
| Year | Title | Role | Producer | Ref(s) |
|---|---|---|---|---|
| 2015 | James St. James' Transformations | Guest | World of Wonder | |
| 2015 | Cooking with Drag Queens | Guest | Feast of Fun | |
| 2017 | PMB | Guest | Willam Belli | |
| 2017 | Drag Queen Carpool | Guest, hosted by RuPaul | Logo | |
| 2017 | Untucked | Guest | World of Wonder | |
| 2017 | Countdown to the Crown | Guest | World of Wonder | |
| 2017 | Shot with Soju | Guest | DS Shin | |
| 2017 | Whatcha Packin' | Guest | Logo | |
| 2017 | Queen to Queen | Guest | Logo | |
| 2017 | Drag Makeup Tutorial | Guest | Logo | |
| 2017 | Talking with the Tuck | Guest | Trinity the Tuck | |
| 2018 | Call Me Couleé | Star | Jordan Phelps, Vincent Martell | |
| 2018 | Chaotic Creative | Guest | Zain Meghji | |
| 2018 | Jasmine Master' Class | Guest | World of Wonder | |
| 2018 | Fashion Photo RuView | Special Guest | World of Wonder | |
| 2018 | Spillin' the Tea | Guest | Billboard | |
| 2018 | Cosmo Queens | Guest star | Cosmopolitan | |
| 2019 | Huda Boss | Guest | Mari Haitkin | |
| 2020 | Bobbin' Around | Guest | Caldwell Tidicue | |
| 2020 | Served! | Guest | MTV | |
| 2020 | The X Change Rate | Guest | Monét X Change | |
| 2020 | Loleezbo | Guest | Loleezbo Productions | |
| 2020 | Love for the Arts | Guest judge | Trinity the Tuck | |
| 2020 | Pepp Talks | Guest | Peppermint | |
| 2021 | The Pit Stop | Guest | VH1 | |
| 2021 | Homophilia | Guest | WOW Podcast Network | . |
| 2021 | Bambi Bakes | Guest | Moving Standard | |
| 2021 | Drag Queens React | Guest | World of Wonder | |
| 2021 | Binge | Guest | Entertainment Weekly | |
| 2021 | Beautiful People | Guest | Youth to the People | |
| 2022 | Around the Table | Guest | Entertainment Weekly | |
| 2022 | BuzzFeed Celeb | Guest | BuzzFeed | |
| 2022 | Friendship Test | Guest | Glamour | |
| 2022 | Out & Out | Featured guest | ASOS | |
| 2022 | Drip Or Drop? | Guest | Cosmopolitan | |
| 2022 | Portrait of a Queen | Featured guest | World of Wonder | |
| 2023 | It's Giving Fashion | Host | Sony Podcast | |
| 2023 | Go Fact Yourself | Expert | Maximum Fun | |
| 2024 | Drag Me to the Movies | Various | World of Wonder | |

== Theatre ==
| Year | Production | Role | Venue | Ref(s) |
|---|---|---|---|---|
| 2019 | Couleé with a "C" | Herself | Laurie Beechman Theatre | |
| 2019 | The Naughty Tour | Herself | Abraham Chavez Theatre | |
| 2020 | A Midsummer Slay: The Slequel! | Herself | Palace Theatre | |

== Awards and nominations ==
| Year | Award-giving body | Category | Work | Results |
|---|---|---|---|---|
| 2023 | Queerty Awards | Best Music Video | "Let Go & Your Name" | Nominated |

== See also ==
- LGBT culture in Chicago

| Preceded by Monét X Change; Trinity the Tuck | Winner of RuPaul's Drag Race All Stars; US All Stars 5 | Succeeded by Kylie Sonique Love |
