= Toni Ko =

American businesswoman

- Born: 1973; Daegu, South Korea
- Citizenship: American
- Occupations: CEO of Butter Ventures; CEO of Perverse Sunglasses; CEO of Bespoke Beauty Brands
- Known for: Founder of NYX Cosmetics

Korean name
- Hangul: 고미영
- RR: Go Miyeong
- MR: Ko Miyŏng

Toni Ko (born 1973) is an American businesswoman and founder of NYX Cosmetics. She currently works in Los Angeles. She founded her company in 1999 and expanded it until she sold it to L’Oréal in 2014 for $500 million. She lives in Los Angeles with her husband, while also running two new businesses, a venture capital firm focused on funding female entrepreneurs and a beauty brand accelerator.

== Early life ==
Ko was born in Daegu, South Korea. In 1986, at the age of 13, her family immigrated to the United States. When she first arrived, she spoke no English and was placed directly in the seventh grade. She spent most of her teenage years working for her parents, who also worked in the cosmetics industry as wholesalers. She attended Glendale Community College on the weekends, and operated the business with her parents during the week, but eventually dropped out to work for her parents as a manager of their wholesale business full-time.

== Career ==
=== NYX Cosmetics ===
With her prior experience in cosmetics, Toni sought to fill a gap in the market for lower-priced, high-quality makeup products. In 1999, Ko founded NYX Cosmetics, being given $250,000 in startup money from her mother. The company was named after the Greek goddess Nyx.

Her original goal was to “... make a department store product with the price point of a drugstore product.” The company earned $4 million in its first year.

The first NYX Cosmetics line consisted of six eye and twelve lip liners, which were priced at $1.99 each in comparison to their competitors whose prices hovered around the $10 mark. In less than a month, all of the products sold out.

Her high-quality, low-price approach fulfilled a developing consumer need after increased demand due to the 2008 financial crisis. She also increased the company’s sales during the advent of the vlog on Youtube by partnering with trending beauty creators on the platform. This unconventional marketing approach formulated a strong brand that appealed to a younger audience and set the company up for a potential buyout.

In 2014, Ko sold NYX Cosmetics to L'Oréal for an estimated $500 million.

=== After NYX Cosmetics ===
Due to a non-compete clause with L'Oréal, Ko could not launch another cosmetics company during the five years following the buyout. In March 2016, Ko created the Perverse Sunglasses company, launching as a sponsor of Coachella. Ko changed the brand's name to Thomas James LA. The retailer sells online only, following an unsuccessful attempt at opening brick-and-mortar stores. Ko later sold the company in 2019.

She also is the founder and current CEO of Butter Ventures, a principal venture firm based in California that invests in start-ups, focusing specifically on those created by women.

==== Bespoke Beauty Brands ====
On September 30, 2019, following the five-year non-compete agreement with L'Oréal, Toni Ko launched a new cosmetics-focused company, Bespoke Beauty Brands (BBB), which would launch brands in cooperation with various celebrities and social-media influencers. The company's first collection, KimChi Chic Beauty, launched on October 16, 2019, in partnership with drag queen Kim Chi. On January 17, 2021, Bespoke Beauty Brands launched Jason Wu Beauty at Target, in partnership with designer Jason Wu.

== Awards and honors ==
Ko has received various awards in connection to her business work. According to Ko, the most meaningful award was her brand NYX Cosmetics receiving the WWD Inc. 2013 Beauty Brand of the Year. In 2013, she received the Lifetime Achievement Award from the Beauty Bus Foundation. In 2014, Toni added two more awards to her collection, winning the Entrepreneur of the Year Award from the Asian Business Association and the Leadership Award from the NAWBO. The National Women's History Museum honored Ko at the 2016 Women Making History Awards. In 2021, Ko ranked #94 on Forbes’ list of American Self-Made Women, with an estimated net worth of $260 million.
