= The Vixen (drag queen) =

American drag performer

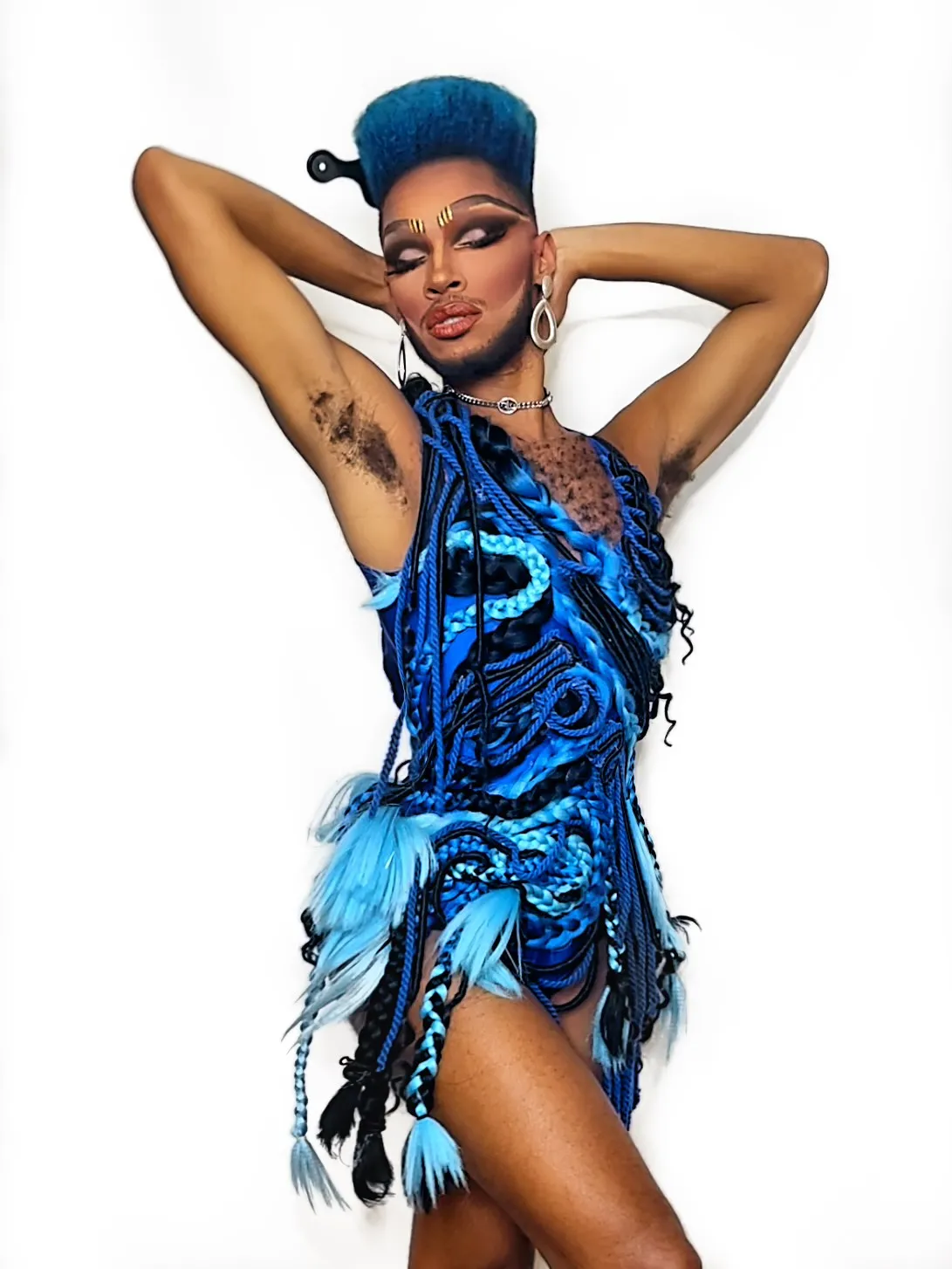
- The Vixen for Chicago Reader magazine, 2021
- Born: Anthony Prince Taylor; December 11, 1990 (age 35); Chicago, Illinois, U.S.
- Education: Columbia College Chicago
- Occupations: Drag queen; musician
- Years active: 2013–present
- Known for: RuPaul's Drag Race (season 10) BlackGirlMagic Drag Show
- Website: thevixensworld.com

The Vixen is the stage name of Anthony Prince Taylor, an American drag performer best known for competing on the tenth season of RuPaul's Drag Race and placing seventh. Her appearance on the show was notable for raising a conversation around racial dynamics, both among her fellow drag queens and in the show's fandom. She is the founder of Black Girl Magic, a drag show consisting of only African-American queens. In August 2020, she released Commercial Break, her debut album.

== Early life ==
Taylor was born to Sheri Jones. He started doing drag at a local bar called the Jeffery Pub in April 2013. His drag mother is Savannah Westbrooke. The drag name "The Vixen" comes from his love of 1920s vintage wear, and the word "vixen" comes in those searches.

== Career ==
The Vixen is known for blending political activism and queer advocacy into her drag performances. She has been an outspoken critic about anti-black sentiment in America, including in white queer communities, stating, "you [often] have to choose between calling out racism or homophobia".

In November 2016, Taylor founded Black Girl Magic, a drag show consisting of only African-American queens. Drag Race alumni DiDa Ritz and Shea Couleé were part of the first show. Her fellow season ten contestants Asia O'Hara, Monét X Change and Monique Heart were added to the line-up of the Black Girl Magic cast in June 2018.

The Vixen was announced as one of fourteen contestants for season ten of RuPaul's Drag Race on February 22, 2018. She won the episode two main challenge. In the third episode, she engaged in a verbal back-and-forth with fellow contestant Aquaria, which left Aquaria crying and The Vixen noting that the exchange "created the narrative [of] an angry black woman who has scared off the little white girl". Although Aquaria eventually conceded the point and later came to her defense, The Vixen received online death threats from Drag Race fans afterwards. She faced more backlash after quarreling with competitor Eureka O'Hara in multiple episodes, most notably in episode 4 of Untucked. She was eliminated in seventh place after losing a lip sync to "Groove Is in the Heart" against Asia. During the final reunion episode, she walked offstage after feeling cornered by moderator and host RuPaul who kept pressing her to revisit past confrontations with Aquaria and Eureka. Season six alum Courtney Act later criticized RuPaul for a lack of compassion during the exchange.

Outside of Drag Race, The Vixen had a booth covered with the Black Girl Magic logo for the first annual Wakandacon in August 2018.

She became a sponsor for Grindr's "Kindr" public service announcement in September 2018, in an effort to stop racial discrimination in the app.

=== Music ===
Before her stint on Drag Race, The Vixen was a featured guest on Couleé's 2017 song "Cocky". She released her first solo single, "Room Pt. 1", in March 2018. She released "Room Pt. 2" on September 28, 2018, featuring Couleé. The Vixen was featured with other Chicago drag queens on the song "Drag" by Dorian Electra. On October 17, 2018, she released the song "Demons, Witches & Bitches" with DJ Shilow and Aja. She released the single "Tea Party" on December 11, 2018. She released her debut album, Commercial Break, on August 4, 2020.

== Personal life ==
The Vixen is gay. Her former drag daughter is Delikate Doll. In 2023, she announced that she had moved from Chicago to New Orleans, Louisiana.

== Filmography ==
=== Movies ===
Year	Title	Role	Notes
2016	Lipstick City	Red Dancer	Short film by Shea Couleé

=== Television ===
Year	Title	Role	Notes	Ref
2018	RuPaul's Drag Race (season 10)	Herself	Contestant (7th place)	
2018	RuPaul's Drag Race: Untucked (season 10)	Herself	Contestant (7th place)	
2018	ABC 7 Chicago	Herself	Guest	
2018	The Jam	Herself	Guest	
2019	Empire	Drag queen	Episode: "Never Doubt I Love"	

=== Music videos ===
Year	Title	Artist
2017	"Cocky"	Shea Couleé
2017	"Ride"	Shea Couleé

=== Web series ===
Year	Title	Role	Ref.
2016	Cooking with Drag Queens	Herself	
2018	Watcha Packin'?	Herself	
2018	Cosmo Queens	Herself	
2018	Queen to Queen	Herself	
2018	Countdown to the Crown	Herself	
2019	Hey Qween!	Herself	
2019	Behind the Drag	Herself	
2019	Detailz	Herself	
2020	Queer Table	Herself	
2021	Bambi Bakes	Herself	

== Discography ==
=== Albums ===
Year	Title	Notes
2020	Commercial Break	Featuring Lucy Stoole and Dida Ritz

=== Singles ===
==== Lead artist ====
Year	Title	Notes
2018	"Room Pt. 1"	
2018	"Room Pt. 2"	Featuring Shea Couleé
2018	"Tea Party"	

==== Featured artist ====
Year	Title	Artist
2017	"Cocky"	Shea Couleé (featuring Lila Star and The Vixen)
2018	"Drag"	Dorian Electra (featuring Imp Queen, Lucy Stoole, Eva Young, The Vixen and London Jade)
2018	"Demons, Witches & Bitches"	Aja (featuring DJ Shilow and The Vixen)
