= 8 (Shea Couleé album) =

2023 album by Shea Couleé

Studio album by Shea Couleé
- Released: February 24, 2023
- Length: 25:06

Shea Couleé chronology
Couleé-D (2017)	8 (2023)

Singles from 8
- 1. "Collide" Released: June 12, 2020; 2. "Your Name" Released: July 12, 2022; 3. "Let Go" Released: August 5, 2022; 4. "Material" Released: February 17, 2023

8 is the debut studio album by American Drag Queen Shea Couleé, released on February 24, 2023.

== Composition ==
"Your Name" has been described as "a groovy Disco banger".

== Promotion ==
"Let Go" and "Your Name" were released as singles and received a 1980s-inspired music video.

== Track listing ==
1. "Collide"
2. "Divine"
3. "New Phone Who Dis?"
4. "La Perla"
5. "Let Go"
6. "Your Name"
7. "Material"
8. "Self Control"
