= Slug (character) =

Marvel Comics supervillain

- The Slug battles Spider-Man. From Web of Spider-Man Annual #4

Publication information
- Publisher: Marvel Comics
- First appearance: Captain America #325 (Jan 1987)
- Created by: Mark Gruenwald and Paul Neary

In-story information
- Alter ego: Ulysses X. Lugman
- Abilities: Gifted intellect Use of his immense fat

Slug (Ulysses X. Lugman) is a supervillain appearing in American comic books published by Marvel Comics.

Shea Couleé portrayed the character in the Marvel Cinematic Universe Disney+ series Ironheart (2025).

== Publication history ==
The supervillain Slug first appeared in Captain America #325 (January 1987) and was co-created by Mark Gruenwald and Paul Neary.

In regards to the character's concept, Mark Gruenwald once commented that he initially thought a 1,200 pound man was implausible, but later discovered the existence of such individuals through reading People magazine.

== Fictional character biography ==
Ulysses Lugman was born in Miami, Florida. He is a notorious drug kingpin and criminal organizer, as well as the president and owner of several legal businesses in Miami. Due to his obesity, he took on the name "Slug."

After discovering that Slug is involved with the Kingpin, Nomad infiltrates his organization. Slug battles Nomad and Captain America, but he is ultimately defeated and his criminal empire is dismantled.

Slug is one of the villains shown in the crossover event Dead Man's Hand, where he meets with other criminals to divide the territory and possessions of the deposed Kingpin. The situation falls apart due to various factors, including infighting among the group leaders and the infiltration of Microchip and Mickey Fondozzi. Slug attempts to escape, but is caught by Nomad.

Slug breaks out of the Raft and joins the Hood's criminal empire. He helps them fight the New Avengers, but is taken down by Doctor Strange.

During the "Secret Invasion" storyline, Hood's crime syndicate questions a group of Skrulls who had tried to take Madame Masque. It is soon discovered that Slug is a Skrull in disguise when Hood uses a spell that reveals the Skrull. The Skrull posing as Slug is killed by the Hood.

During the "Dark Reign" storyline, the real Slug returns to the Hood's gang. After video footage of Tigra being beaten by the Hood is released onto the internet, Tigra and Giant-Man identify Slug as the source of the footage. Now penniless after the Hood's fall from power, Slug sells the footage to a celebrity video website for money.

== Powers and abilities ==
Slug possesses a gifted intellect and is a master strategist with a sharp business acumen, often leading through a combination of intimidation and rewards.

His most notable attribute is his immense weight, which can exceed one thousand pounds. According to The Official Handbook of the Marvel Universe: Update '89, it is possible that Slug is a mutant, given how difficult it is for a normal person to achieve such tremendous mass and remain alive.

Slug lacks the ability to compensate for his mass, rendering him practically immobile unless he is utilizing a high-tech personal hovercraft. Slug's high percentage of body fat allows him to float effortlessly in water, and his metabolism grants him limited immunity to drugs and poisons. Slug is known to asphyxiate others (usually his underlings who have failed or displeased him) in the folds of his flesh.

=== Equipment ===
Due to his extreme sensitivity to light, Slug is almost always seen wearing shaded eyeglasses.

In order to move around, Slug makes use of special custom-designed heavy-duty electric wheelchair/forklifts that are outfitted with tank treads or heavy tires. For longer distances, Slug travels in a custom semi-trailer.

== In other media ==
Slug appears in Ironheart, portrayed by Shea Couleé. This version is a hacker, former drag queen, and member of a Chicago street gang led by the Hood who is described as the most wanted person in Madripoor. When Slug and the other teammates later learned that John King had killed Rampage, Hood fires them.
