= Thug Talk =

Mixtape by Boosie Badazz

Mixtape by Boosie Badazz
- Released: March 16, 2016
- Genre: Southern hip hop
- Length: 61:24
- Label: Badazz Music Syndicate
- Producer: 20k; Backpack; B Don; Decky On Da Track; Evil G; G Luck; Nicholas "Fouryn" Baker; Stoopid Beatz

Boosie Badazz chronology
Out My Feelings in My Past (2016)	Thug Talk (2016)	Penitentiary Chances (2016)

Professional ratings
Review scores
Source	Rating
AllMusic	3.5/5 stars
HipHopDX	4/5
Pitchfork	7.3/10
XXL	8/10

Thug Talk is a mixtape by American rapper Boosie Badazz. It was released on March 16, 2016 via Badazz Music Syndicate. Production was handled by G Luck & B Don, Stoopid Beatz, 20k, Backpack, Decky On Da Track, Evil G and Nicholas "Fouryn" Baker among others. It features guest appearances from Webbie, Z-Ro and the late Pimp C. The album debuted at number 130 on the Billboard 200, number 14 on the Top R&B/Hip-Hop Albums, number 10 on the Top Rap Albums and number 11 on the Independent Albums charts in the United States.

== Critical reception ==
Israel Daramola of Pitchfork resumed: "after a scary bout with cancer, Boosie Badazz has a new lease on life and is releasing new music at a steady clip. Thug Talk is another hard memorandum on the turmoil of gangsta life". AllMusic's David Jeffries wrote: "this street release adds to the pile of 2016 LPs from Boosie Badazz, all of them worth a listen. Unlike others that spoke to the MC's battle with cancer, Thug Talk does just what it says on the tin, offering a series of tracks about street crime and drug dealing. Preaching isn't his thing, and yet the MC's honesty and cold, hard facts are deterrents set to banging beats. A posthumous Pimp C interview on the cut "Wake Up" underlines this view, while the streetwise MCs Webbie and Z-Ro are the sharp album's only guests".

== Track listing ==
No.	Title	Length
1.	"Thug Talk"	4:54
2.	"Finish U"	2:02
3.	"For da Love of Money"	3:43
4.	"Regret It" (featuring Webbie)	4:07
5.	"Wake Up" (featuring Pimp C)	5:02
6.	"Off the Chain"	3:22
7.	"TV"	3:50
8.	"Rainbow"	3:12
9.	"Retarded"	3:28
10.	"Right Game Wrong Nigga"	4:02
11.	"Streetwars"	3:48
12.	"What You Know About Me"	2:54
13.	"Menace II Society"	3:32
14.	"No Surrender No Retreat"	3:05
15.	"Found Love N U"	2:58
16.	"Go Away" (featuring Z-Ro)	4:02
17.	"Thug Prayer"	3:23
Total length:		61:24

== Charts ==
Chart performance for Thug Talk
Chart (2016)	Peak position
US Billboard 200	130
US Top R&B/Hip-Hop Albums (Billboard)	14
US Top Rap Albums (Billboard)	10
US Independent Albums (Billboard)	11
