= Halessia =

Brazilian drag queen and model

- Born: Felipe Salinas Cavina; June 27, 1996 (age 30); Assis, São Paulo
- Occupations: model; entrepreneur; makeup artist; drag queen
- Years active: 2014–present

Felipe Salinas Cavina (born 27 June 1996 in Assis, São Paulo), better known by the stage name Halessia, is a Brazilian model, entrepreneur, makeup artist, and drag queen. He is best known for his wig brand "Rocker Front & Full Laces".

== Early life ==
Felipe Salinas Cavina was born on 27 June 1996 in Assis, São Paulo as the youngest child of chambermaid Marisol Salinas and bricklayer Eduardo Cavina. At the age of six, he moved to Barra da Lagoa in Florianópolis, and lived there until the age of eighteen. Upon reaching adulthood, he decided to pursue a dream of working as a drag queen and model, which later led him to move to the city of São Paulo.

== Career ==
=== 2014–2019: Early career and Rocker Front & Full Laces ===
In 2014, before beginning his career as a drag queen, Halessia became popular on Tumblr, where he posted edited concept photos in the style of American boys. He stood out and gained notability on social media due to his distinctive photos within the Brazilian market. Based on his success with online media, he was signed by Ford Models Brasil in Florianópolis. Later, he later gave up his modeling career. When he was 18 years old, Halessia began his drag queen career, and made his first appearance at a Halloween party. Later he performed as a drag queen throughout Santa Catarina. In 2016, he moved to São Paulo to participate in a casting selection for the program Drag Me as a Queen on E!. Though he did not pass the selection, he settled in São Paulo and began performing in night clubs in São Paulo. Halessia began his entrepreneurial journey by founding a choker store, where he produced the pieces himself and sold them via Instagram. In 2018, he launched his wig brand "Rocker Front & Full Laces". He quickly gained acclaim on social media and from major Brazilian artists such as Anitta, Luísa Sonza, Manu Gavassi, and Gloria Groove, who became clients of his brand.

=== 2020–present: Way Model and Paris Fashion Week ===
In 2020, Halessia signed with Way Model, the same agency that has represented models such as Sasha Meneghel, Caroline Trentini, and Alessandra Ambrosio. Later that year, he made a brief appearance as a guest judge on the program Love for the Arts. In August 2020, he appeared on the cover of Vogue magazine in an edition celebrating the freedom to be oneself.

Halessia has cited Naomi Campbell, Gisele Bündchen, Lady Gaga, RuPaul, Nicki Minaj, and Iggy Azalea as his major artistic influences. In 2021, he launched his music career with the release of the single Supermodel. As a fashion-focused drag performer, the styling and costumes featured in the music video played an important role in the development of the project.

In 2023, Halessia became the muse of O Carnaval da Sabrina + Unidos do Bar Brahma, a carnival bloc associated with Sabrina Sato in São Paulo. Later that year, he walked the ramp at the São Paulo Fashion Week and at the Casa de Criadores. In the same year, he was invited to the Cannes Film Festival to attend the premiere of the film Jeanne du Barry at the Grand Théâtre Lumière. In September of the same year, during Iggy Azalea's visit to Brazil, the singer presented Halessia with a handwritten letter and the costume she had worn during her performance at the inaugural edition of "The Town" festival.

Halessia had a popular following on social media, with more than 69 million likes and 3.9 million followers on TikTok, in addition to over 1.5 million followers in Instagram as of 2023. In 2024, Halessia made his debut at the Paris Fashion Week for the fashion label Windowsen. This made Halessia the first Brazilian drag queen to walk at Paris Fashion Week.

== Personal life ==
In a video published on YouTube, Halessia identified as a non-binary and pansexual person.

== Controversies ==
=== WePink ===
Halessia published a video on Instagram addressing the promotional content he created for a controversial foundation product from WePink, a cosmetics brand associated with influencer Virginia Fonseca. After receiving requests from followers, Halessia commented on the advertisement, which had featured testing and praise for the product despite criticism for the product from several beauty influencers, including Karen Bachini.

According to Halessia, the sponsored content was intended to introduce the product to followers, describe its characteristics, test it on his skin, and conclude with a drag makeup. He stated that he generally does not typically create such type of review videos in which products are tested in comparison with others and instead leave similar analysis to creators who specialize in product reviews.

Halessia further explained that the product was tested only within the context of creating a drag makeup look, which generally requires several layers of foundation and various finishing techniques. According to Halessia, the goal of the advertisement was simply to demonstrate how the product appeared on his skin.

== Awards and nominations ==
Year	Award	Category	Result
2022	MTV Millennial Awards	Miaw Fashion	Nominated
