= Out My Feelings in My Past =

Out My Feelings (In My Past)

Mixtape by Boosie Badazz
- Released: February 5, 2016
- Genre: Southern hip hop
- Length: 1:04:56
- Label: Badazz Music Syndicate; Empire
- Producer: G Luck & B Don; Nicholas "Fouryn" Baker

Boosie Badazz chronology
In My Feelings. (Goin' Thru It) (2016)	Out My Feelings (In My Past) (2016)	Thug Talk (2016)

Out My Feelings (In My Past) is a mixtape by American rapper Boosie Badazz. It was released on February 5, 2016 via Badazz Music Syndicate/Empire. Production was handled by B Don, G Luck and Nicholas "Fouryn" Baker among others. It features guest appearances from Derez De'Shon, Mista Cain, Sauce Walka, Shy Glizzy, Slim Thug and T.Y. The album debuted at number 57 on the Billboard 200, number 10 on the Top R&B/Hip-Hop Albums, number 6 on the Top Rap Albums and number 2 on the Independent Albums charts in the United States. Music video were directed for "Wanna B Heard", "Problem", "World War 6", "Real Nigga" and "The Truth".

== Critical reception ==
Professional ratings
Aggregate scores
Source	Rating
Metacritic	82/100
Review scores
Source	Rating
AllMusic	4/5 stars
HipHopDX	4/5
Pitchfork	7.6/10
Spin	8/10

Out My Feelings (In My Past) was met with widespread critical acclaim from music critics. At Metacritic, which assigns a normalized rating out of 100 to reviews from mainstream critics, the album received an average score of 82, based on four reviews.

AllMusic's David Jeffries wrote: "it doesn't matter that Out My Feelings (In My Past) runs 18 tracks long, as Boosie Badazz is on point the whole way through this dark yet empowering album". Homer Johnsen of HipHopDX praised the project saying that it "is ambitious in scale, and contains some of his best work to date. The message and content aren't always constant, but the ebb and flow of the experience enable a strong diversity of sound, and Boosie adapts to the beats like a chameleon with different colors". Paul Thompson of Spin found the album "is not the bright and exalted counterpoint you might expect--it's still grim, but Boosie turns his focus outward". Israel Daramola of Pitchfork wrote that the album "doesn’t have the rawness of In My Feelings, but its production is impeccable where that one was spotty, and it soars when Boosie reminisces on his pre-rap days or makes statements in line with Black Lives Matter about the murders of unarmed black people by cops".

== Track listing ==
No.	Title	Length
1.	"Problem"	3:12
2.	"Takem Back"	4:12
3.	"Real Nigga"	4:04
4.	"Choppaz n' Gunz"	3:51
5.	"Look at Life Different"	3:01
6.	"Mann"	3:32
7.	"Got It on Me" (featuring Derez De'Shon and Shy Glizzy)	4:25
8.	"The Truth"	3:54
9.	"Big Blue Hundreds" (featuring Mista Cain)	3:34
10.	"True"	5:24
11.	"Wanna B Heard" (featuring Slim Thug)	3:34
12.	"World War 6"	2:20
13.	"BG Shit" (featuring T.Y.)	3:41
14.	"Uncle Tone"	2:43
15.	"Park It Lik Bih" (featuring Sauce Walka)	4:39
16.	"All That Mixed n' One"	3:19
17.	"New School/Old School"	2:39
18.	"Who Finished?"	2:52
Total length:		1:04:56

== Charts ==
Chart performance for Out My Feelings In My Past
Chart (2016)	Peak position
US Billboard 200	57
US Top R&B/Hip-Hop Albums (Billboard)	10
US Top Rap Albums (Billboard)	7
US Independent Albums (Billboard)	2
