= In My Feelings (Goin' Thru It) =

Mixtape by Boosie Badazz
- Released: January 1, 2016
- Genre: Hip hop
- Length: 33:53

Boosie Badazz chronology
Thrilla, Vol. 1 (2015)	In My Feelings (Goin' Thru It) (2016)	Out My Feelings in My Past (2016)

In My Feelings (Goin' Thru It) is a mixtape by American rapper Boosie Badazz. It was self-released on January 1, 2016, a few months after the artist announced that he had cancer and underwent surgery. In this effort, the rapper talks about his experiences during that period of his life. The album peaked at number 105 on the Billboard 200, number 11 on the Top R&B/Hip-Hop Albums, number 8 on the Top Rap Albums and number 4 on the Independent Albums in the United States. Music videos were released for "Cancer", "Smile To Keep From Crying", "The Rain" and "Forgive Me Being Lost". The sequel to the album, Out My Feelings in My Past, was released on the fifth of February the same year.

== Critical reception ==
Professional ratings
Aggregate scores
Source	Rating
Metacritic	72/100
Review scores
Source	Rating
AllMusic	3.5/5 stars
Pitchfork	6.9/10
RapReviews	7/10

In My Feelings (Goin' Thru It) was met with generally favorable reviews from music critics. At Metacritic, which assigns a normalized rating out of 100 to reviews from mainstream publications, the album received an average score of 72, based on four reviews. AllMusic's David Jeffries wrote that the album "would be among the MC's best work, but Boosie continues to stun even with these instant, and somewhat sloppy, releases, so leave this for the fans, and then consider becoming a fan". Spin reviewer wrote: "a brief, somber meditation on his health problems and on the stresses of supporting dozens of friends and family members". The Wire reviewer wrote: "the production throughout is a heavy slurry of deep bass and wavering, churchical keys, and songs that are not explicitly about his medical troubles are about the perennial problems of untrue friends and false lovers". Paul A. Thompson of Pitchfork found the album "often feels as if its about to collapse under its own weight, which is doubly frustrating when you consider it clocks in at a slight 34 minutes".

== Track listing ==
No.	Title	Length
1.	"The Rain"	3:22
2.	"Cancer"	2:43
3.	"Stressing Me"	4:03
4.	"Warning Signs"	4:03
5.	"Bad Guy"	3:06
6.	"Call of Duty"	4:08
7.	"Smile to Keep From Crying"	2:45
8.	"Forgive Me Being Lost"	2:38
9.	"Roller Coaster Ride"	3:30
10.	"I Know They Gone Miss Me"	3:35
Total length:		33:53

== Charts ==
Chart performance for In My Feelings. (Goin' Thru It)
Chart (2016)	Peak position
US Billboard 200	105
US Top R&B/Hip-Hop Albums (Billboard)	11
US Top Rap Albums (Billboard)	8
US Independent Albums (Billboard)	4
