= Box Office (album) =

Studio album by Aja
- Released: February 7, 2019
- Genre: Hip-hop
- Length: 57:34
- Label: Self-released
- Producer: Aja (exec.); WNNR; DJ Accident Report; Ruben Ocen

Aja chronology
In My Feelings (2018)	Box Office (2019)	All Caps (2019)

Singles from Box Office
- 1. "Jekyll & Hyde" Released: December 5, 2018

Box Office is the debut studio album by American drag performer and musician Aja, released on February 7, 2019. "Jekyll & Hyde" was released as a single to promote the album. Cupcakke, Lady Luck, Rico Nasty, and Shea Couleé are featured as guests.

== Background and release ==
Aja first came to international recognition when she was announced as a competitor on the ninth season of the drag reality competition show RuPaul's Drag Race in 2017. Later that same year, Aja was announced as one of the competitors on the third season of RuPaul's Drag Race All Stars, which premiered in January 2018.

After her two appearances on Drag Race, Aja turned her attention to music and released several singles, culminating in the eventual release of her debut extended play, In My Feelings in May 2018. In December of that year, Aja released "Jekyll & Hyde" which was later revealed as the lead single from her debut studio album. Box Office was eventually released by Aja independently in February 2019. Prior to the album's release, Aja announced she no longer wished to be known as a drag queen, instead focusing on her career as a rapper and entertainer.

== Track listing ==
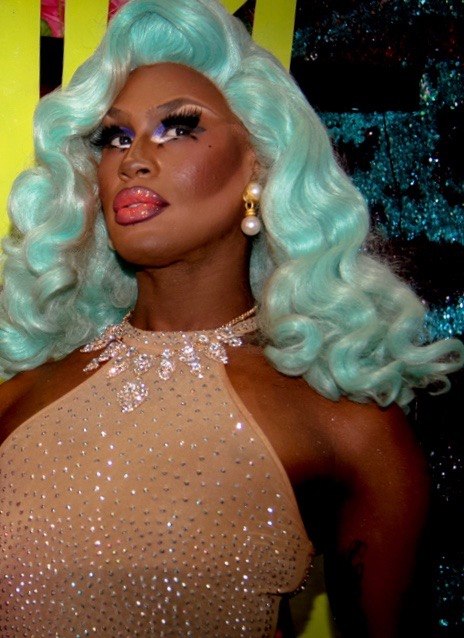
Shea Couleé (pictured in 2017) is featured on the track "Breakfast at Tiffany's".

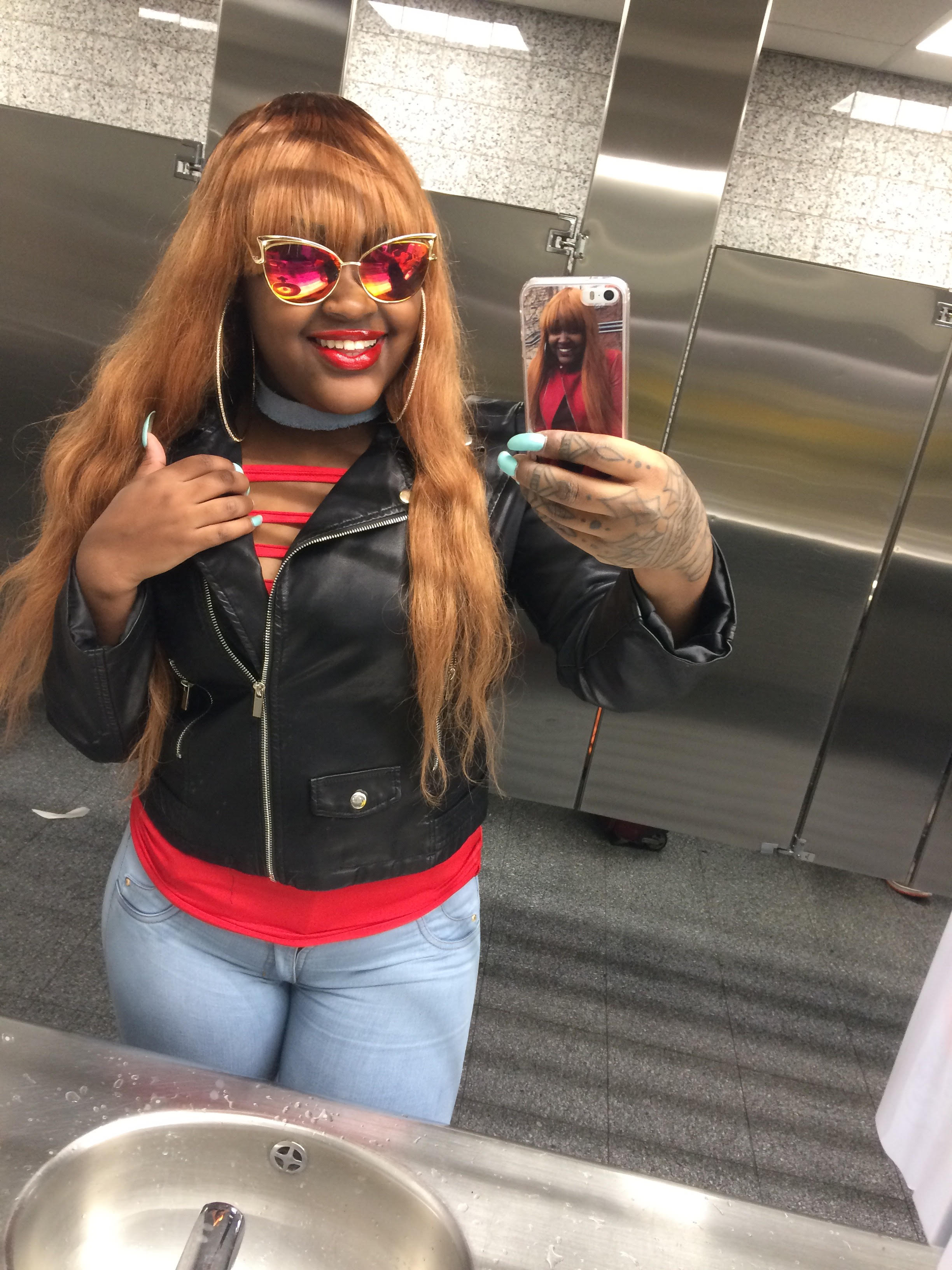
Cupcakke (pictured in 2017) is featured on the song "Safari Zone".

Box Office
No.	Title	Writer(s)	Producer(s)	Length
1.	"Tutankhamun"	Jay Rivera; Eric Shorey; Martin D Fowler	WNNR; DJ Accident Report	3:08
2.	"Decepticon"	Rivera	WNNR; DJ Accident Report	3:26
3.	"Monster Jam"	Rivera; Ruben Ocean	Rivera	3:43
4.	"Breakfast at Tiffany's" (featuring Shea Couleé)	Rivera; Jarren Marell; Ocean	Rivera	3:41
5.	"Willy Wonka"	Rivera; Ocean; Steven Slay	Rivera	4:10
6.	"Rocky" (featuring Lady Luck)	Rivera; Shanell Jones; Young Swish	Rivera	3:48
7.	"Slytherin"	Rivera; Jo Collura	Rivera	4:21
8.	"Chango" (featuring Winstar & Momo)	Rivera; Young Swish	Rivera	3:33
9.	"Ghost"	Rivera; Swish	Rivera	3:54
10.	"Jekyll & Hyde" (featuring Shilow)	Rivera; Chance Parsons; Ocean	Ruben Ocean	3:50
11.	"Yokai"	Rivera; Slay	Rivera	3:36
12.	"Anarchy"	Rivera; Ocean; Swish	Rivera	4:20
13.	"Clowns" (featuring Rico Nasty)	Rivera; Maria-Cecilia Simone Kelly; Ocean	Rivera	4:23
14.	"Safari Zone" (featuring Cupcakke)	Rivera; Elizabeth Eden Harris; Swish	Rivera	3:07
15.	"Kill Bill"	Rivera; Swish	Rivera	4:34
Total length:				57:34
