= Aja (entertainer) =

American rapper and drag queen

- Born: January 4, 1994 (age 32); Bedford-Stuyvesant, Brooklyn, New York, US
- Other names: Venus Nadya Oshun; Aja 007; Aja LaBeija; Aja Miyake-Mugler
- Occupations: Drag queen; rapper
- Known for: RuPaul's Drag Race (season 9); RuPaul's Drag Race All Stars (season 3 and season 10)
- Musical career
- Genre: Hip hop
- Instrument: Vocals

Venus Nadya Oshun (born January 4, 1994), known professionally as Aja Miyake-Mugler (Note: Formerly as Aja LaBeija.) or better known mononymously as Aja (/ˈɑːʒə/ AH-zhə), is an American rapper, reality television personality and drag queen best known for competing on the ninth season of RuPaul's Drag Race and on the third and tenth seasons of RuPaul's Drag Race All Stars.

Aja released her debut EP, In My Feelings, in 2018, followed by her debut studio album, BOX Office, in February 2019. Her second EP, ALL CAPS, was released in June 2019. She released Nail in the Coffin, a Halloween-themed EP, in collaboration with Shilow later that year. She was a contestant on the third season of Legendary on HBO Max, where she finished in 6th place with the House of LaBeija.

== Early life ==
Aja was born on January 4, 1994, in Bedford–Stuyvesant, Brooklyn. She was raised by adoptive parents. Aja reconnected with her biological mother, Linda, later in life until her death in 2024. She used to suffer from PTSD and anxiety, which she attributed to her single-parent home, but stopped having panic attacks after starting drag. She lived as a trans woman for a year at age 18, later coming to identify as genderqueer after learning about non-binary gender identities. Aja identifies as a person of color. She is of African American, Puerto Rican, Egyptian and Nigerian descent. Specifically, her mother is of Puerto Rican (Indigenous Taíno and Arawak), African American and Egyptian heritage, and her father is African American with some Nigerian ancestry.

== Career ==
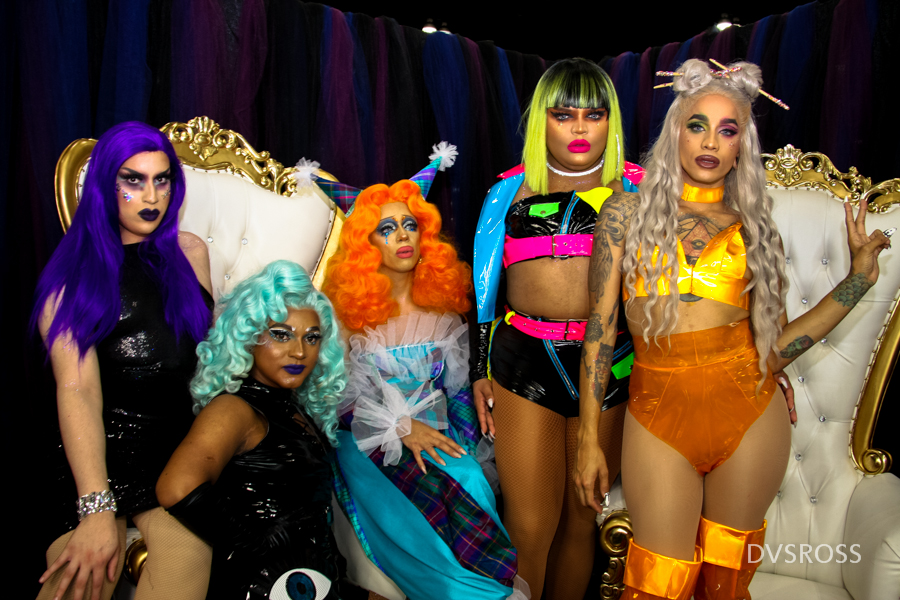
Haus of Aja (Janelle No5, Momo Shade, Aja, Kandy Muse and Dahlia Sin) at DragCon 2018

Aja began doing drag in Manhattan at age 16, participating in contests at Posh Bar, the Stonewall Inn, Metropolitan Bar and Sugarland. She was announced as one of 14 contestants for the ninth season of RuPaul's Drag Race on February 2, 2017. Aja placed ninth that season and subsequently returned to participate in the third season of RuPaul's Drag Race All Stars. Aja was eliminated during the fifth episode of All Stars 3, but she returned in the following episode to compete for a chance to win re-entry to the competition. Another contestant, Morgan McMichaels, rejoined instead, which placed Aja seventh overall.

The drag house Haus of Aja, based in Bedford–Stuyvesant, includes members Aja, Kandy Muse, Momo Shade, Dahlia Sin, and Janelle No5. They performed at Hardware Bar until the house dissolved in June 2018.

Aja appeared in a commercial for H&M's Pride OUT Loud campaign in May 2018. Since June 2018, Aja has hosted a talk show called Ayo Sis on WOW Presents Plus. In May 2019, Aja was sponsored by Starbucks to promote the company's S'Mores Life contest.

In July 2018, Aja announced that she no longer wish to be known as a drag queen but rather as a queer artist, stating to them. magazine:

[B]eing a queer artist is more generalized, and being a drag queen is way more specific. I know I kind of let go of the idea of being a drag queen because, for most people, the stereotypical drag queen lip syncs and performs. I've been working on my burlesque and my live music, and I don't really have the drive to dance and flip flop and be doing dips and, 'Is she gonna jump from there?' It's just not something I want to do. It's something that is part of me, but it's not something that I'm carrying into the future, so I'm kind of leaving the term behind.

For the next three years, Aja focused primarily on her musical career. In September 2021, she stated that she would again begin performing in drag. After seeing Kylie Sonique Love win the sixth season of RuPaul's Drag Race All Stars, Aja said: "It really hit me at that moment that trans is who I am and drag is what I do,... that me doing drag has never taken away from who I am as a person.... As of today I can feel comfortable to say that I am a drag artist again."

In 2023, Aja appeared on the first episode of the eighth season of RuPaul's Drag Race All Stars as a “lip-sync assassin”, where she faced off against the week's winner, Kahanna Montrese, to Beyoncé’s “Freakum Dress”. Aja won the lipsync and revealed which of the bottom queens had received the majority of the queens’ votes to go home, that being Monica Beverly Hillz.

In July 2023, after having altered her Instagram display name months before, Aja formally announced that she was no longer part of the House of LaBeija, and that she is to be referred to as "Aja 007". (Note: "007" is a title and surname used by vogue performers who are currently not a part of any vogue houses.)

On April 23, 2025, Aja was announced as one of eighteen former Drag Race contestants participating in the tenth season of RuPaul's Drag Race All Stars.

=== Music ===
Aja released the single "Level Ya Pussy Up" with producers WNNR and DJ Accident Report in February 2017. Aja's single with fellow season 9 queens Sasha Velour, Peppermint and Alexis Michelle, titled "C.L.A.T.", was released on April 21, 2017. The track was produced by DJ Mitch Ferrino, who was featured on "Purse First" by Bob the Drag Queen. Producer Adam Joseph remixed Aja's rant about fellow season 9 queen Valentina in a track called "Linda Evangelista". In September 2017, Aja appeared in the music video for Velo's song "Big Dick Daddy" alongside Phi Phi O'Hara.

On March 1, 2018, Aja released a solo music video, "Finish Her!", which was produced in collaboration with WNNR and DJ Accident Report. It features some of Aja's runway looks from All Stars 3. Her debut EP, In My Feelings, was released on May 11, 2018. Videos for two other songs from In My Feelings, "Brujería" and "I Don't Wanna Brag", were released on May 7, 2018, and July 13, 2018, respectively. Aja's second EP, All Caps, was released on June 28, 2019.

Aja's debut studio album, BOX Office, was released on February 7, 2019. The album consists of fifteen tracks and includes features from Shea Couleé and CupcakKe. A music video for the album's single "Jekyll & Hyde" (featuring Shilow) was released ahead of the album on February 1, 2019. On September 27, 2019, Aja released a Halloween-themed collaborative EP with Shilow titled Nail in the Coffin. It was preceded by the music videos for its singles "Mama Chola" (featuring Amira Wang) on August 30, 2019, and "The Purge" on September 23, 2019.

In May 2025, Aja released an original collaboration with Australian singer-songwriter Greg Gould titled "Bloodlines".

== Personal life ==
Aja resides in New York City.

Just before filming season 9 of Drag Race, Aja was in a situation of domestic violence with a previous boyfriend. In December 2017, Aja and her current boyfriend were kicked out of a Lyft ride after kissing. The driver was later fired, and the company issued a statement of support for Aja.

In August 2018, Aja was banned from Twitter for referring to a user who discounted her gender identity as a "senseless cow". Her account was reinstated after a few hours. In a July 2019 interview with them. Magazine, Aja shared that she was going through the process of changing her legal name from her birth name to Aja in order to reflect her gender identity. She said,

I've never identified with the name I have. Being adopted and already having several names, I feel like the name I was given wasn't even my real name. I was like, it'd be nice to have my own name. Especially for someone who identifies as more fluid on the spectrum, as nonbinary, one of the things that really influenced was people thinking there's this dramatic transformation and detachment from Aja as a person and an artist. What people don't realize is that Aja the artist is Aja the person, there is no difference.

She further stated,

I don't like to be dead named. It's really uncomfortable when people do that because even the people in my life don't call me by my government name. I don't think it's proper or respectful. Everyone calls me Aja, even my mom sometimes.

In December 2021, Aja came out as a transgender woman, and announced the beginning of her transition, explaining in an Instagram post and GoFundMe campaign, "I have lived my life as Non Binary since 2018 and have recently began to identify more with the feminine aspect of my identity. Now living my life as a trans woman has brought out worries about different things such as my appearance." Aja uses she/her pronouns.

Aja practices Santeria, and she started doing what she called "sex work" on OnlyFans during the 2020 lockdown. She is bisexual.

== Discography ==
=== Studio albums ===
Title	Details
Box Office	Released: February 7, 2019; Label: self-released; Formats: digital download
Crown	Released: May 21, 2021; Label: self-released; Formats: digital download

=== EPs ===
Title	Details	Ref(s)
In My Feelings	Released: May 11, 2018; Label: self-released; Formats: CD, digital download	
ALL CAPS	Released: June 28, 2019; Label: self-released; Formats: digital download	
Nail in the Coffin	Released: September 27, 2019 (with Shilow); Label: self-released; Formats: CD, digital download	
Femme Queen Rage:, Vol. 1	Released: September 16, 2023; Label: self-released; Formats: digital download	

=== Singles ===
Title	Year	Album	Notes	Ref(s)
"Level Ya Pussy Up"	2017	Non-album singles		
"C.L.A.T." (feat. DJ Mitch Ferrino; with Alexis Michelle, Peppermint, & Sasha Velour)	2017	Non-album singles		
"Finish Her!" (feat. WNNR & DJ Accident Report)	2018	In My Feelings		
"Brujería" (feat. DJ Mitch Ferrino)	2018	In My Feelings		
"Demons, Witches & Bitches" (feat. Shilow & Vixen)	2018	Non-album singles		
"Art Jesus"	2018	Non-album singles		
"Jekyll and Hyde" (feat. Shilow)	2019	BOX Office		
"Commercial"	2019	All Caps		
"Mama Chola" (feat. Amira Wang)	2019	Nail in the Coffin	Credited to Aja & Shilow	
"The Purge"	2019	Nail in the Coffin	Credited to Aja & Shilow	
"Draw the Blood" (feat. Electropoint)	2020	Non-album single	Credited to Honey Davenport & Aja	
"21 Roads" (feat. Katie Jobes)	2021	Crown		
"Tough Love" (feat. GESS)	2021	Crown		
"Crossbow"	2021	Crown		
"Vulture Queen"	2023	Femme Queen Rage; Vol.1		
"Which B!tch Want Smoke?"	2023	Femme Queen Rage; Vol.1		
“Bloodlines” with Greg Gould	2025	Strings Attached		

== Filmography ==
=== Television ===
Year	Title	Role	Notes
2017	RuPaul's Drag Race (season 9)	Contestant	9th place (9 episodes)
2017	RuPaul's Drag Race: Untucked	Herself	Season 8 (7 episodes)
2018	RuPaul's Drag Race All Stars (season 3)	Contestant	7th place (7 episodes)
2019	Tattoo Tales	Herself	1 episode
2022	Legendary (season 3)	Contestant	House of LaBeija (4 episodes)
2023	RuPaul's Drag Race All Stars (season 8)	Herself	Guest; Lip Sync Assassin (1 episode: "The Fame Games")
2025	RuPaul's Drag Race All Stars (season 10)	Contestant	5th place (6 episodes)

=== Film ===
Year	Title	Role	Ref
2018	Femme	Panzy LaRue	

=== Internet series ===
Year	Title	Role	Ref(s)
2018	Hey Qween!	Guest; accompanied by the Haus of Aja	
2018	Fashion Photo RuView	Guest host (two episodes)	
2018	Ayo Sis	Host	
2018	Follow Me	Subject of one episode	
2018	Call Me Couleé	Guest	
2020	The Pit Stop	Guest	

=== Music videos ===
Year	Title	Notes	Ref(s)
2017	"Too Funky" (short)		
2017	"C.L.A.T." (short)		
2018	"Finish Her!"		
2018	"Brujería"		
2018	"I Don't Wanna Brag"		
2018	"I'm Kawaii / Ayo Sis"		
2019	"Jekyll & Hyde feat. Shilow"		
2019	"Mama Chola"		
2019	"The Purge"		
2020	"Draw the Blood" (feat. Electropoint)	Credited to Honey Davenport & Aja	

== See also ==
- Drag culture in New York City
- LGBTQ culture in New York City
- List of LGBTQ people from New York City
- Transgender culture in New York City
