= NYX Professional Makeup =

Cosmetics company

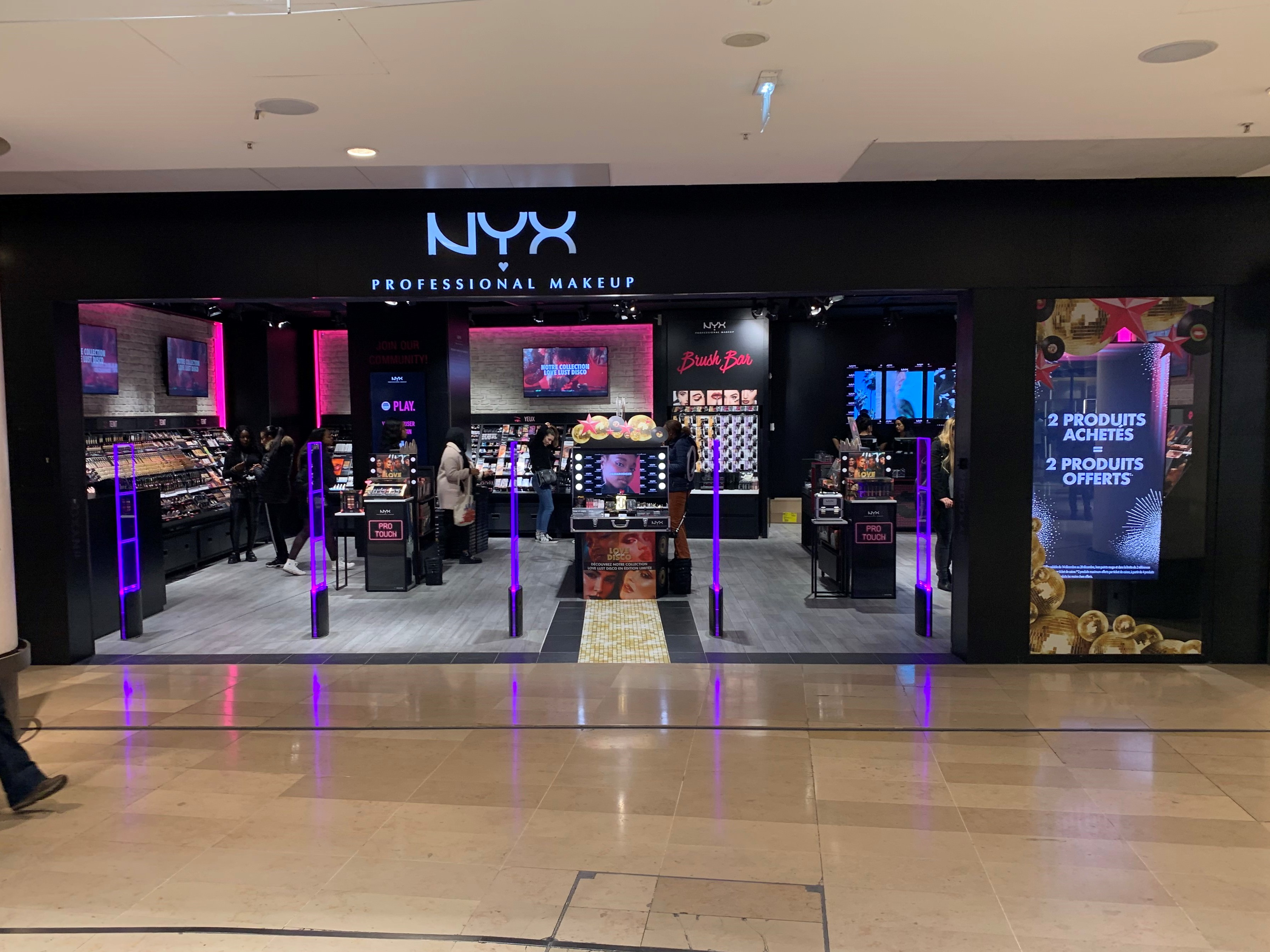
- NYX store in Paris, France
- Type: Subsidiary
- Industry: Cosmetics
- Founded: 1999; 27 years ago
- Founder: Toni Ko
- Headquarters: Los Angeles, California, U.S.
- Area served: Worldwide
- Number of employees: 1,138 (2025)
- Parent: L'Oréal
- Website: www.nyxcosmetics.com

NYX Professional Makeup (/nɪks/) is an American cosmetics company that is a subsidiary of L'Oréal. The company was founded in Los Angeles by Toni Ko in 1999. It was named after Nyx, the Greek goddess of the night. NYX Professional Makeup is "certified" and acknowledged by PETA as a cruelty-free brand, and they offer a wide range of vegan-friendly products. NYX products are sold in over 70 countries at thousands of retailers, ranging from specialty beauty and fashion stores to freestanding shops and the brand's corporate website.

== History ==
=== Founding and early history ===
Toni Ko founded NYX Cosmetics in 1999 when she was 25 using a $250,000 loan from her parents. Ko knew a guy from New Jersey who made pencils, from there, she started with six eyeliners and 12 lip liners, priced at $1.99 and was sold out in less than 30 days. The company's first products were jumbo eye pencils, which brought in revenue of $2 million within the first year. The products were initially sold only to beauty professionals before Ko expanded sale to mass-market outlets. The products were marketed as having "department store beauty" while being sold at "drugstore prices."

In 2011, NYX launched the Freedom and Artistry for Creative Expression (FACE) awards competition.

Sales in 2014 were $120 million. Ulta Beauty carries mass market NYX products.

=== L'Oréal acquisition and recent history ===
In 2014, Ko sold NYX to the French beauty company L'Oréal for $500 million. The sale had a five-year non-compete clause.

NYX Cosmetics continues under other management as a part of L'Oréal, and now provides products including lipstick, lip gloss, and mineral foundation. In September 2015, L'Oréal introduced brick-and-mortar stores devoted to NYX cosmetics. NYX currently operates standalone stores in Australia, Austria, Armenia, Belgium, Canada, Chile, Croatia, Estonia, France, Germany, India, Latvia, Lithuania, Romania, Serbia, Spain, the UK, and the USA. In 2016, NYX reported annual sales growth of 4.7 percent and launched NYX Professional Makeup.

In September 2018, NYX launched Masterclass, an exclusive online educational content library featuring a group of professional makeup artists and top beauty vloggers. The program aims to provide consumers of all skill sets with accessible, professional-grade makeup education.

== Partnerships ==
On March 6, 2019, NYX announced their first exclusive cosmetics sponsorship of the 2019 Coachella Valley Music and Arts Festival. The partnership will provide guests access to innovative digital beauty experiences on the festival grounds, ranging from an interactive beauty bar and touch up area fully equipped with glitter makeup and a glitter fountain, to a massive lip and tongue slide.

On June 23, 2021, esports organization Dignitas announced NYX as its "official beauty partner", including branded content via its women's esports platform Radiant, and sponsorship of its women's Counter Strike: Global Offensive and Valorant teams.
