= In My Feelings (EP) =

2018 EP by Aja

EP by Aja
- Released: May 11, 2018
- Genre: Hip hop
- Label: AJA; Two One Three One

Aja chronology
In My Feelings (2018)	BOX Office (2019)

Singles from In My Feelings
- 1. "Finish Her!" Released: March 1, 2018; 2. "Brujería" Released: May 7, 2018

In My Feelings is the debut EP by American drag queen and singer Aja, released on May 11, 2018. The EP features guest appearances by Mitch Ferrino, Wnnr, DJ Accident Report, and AVG JO.

== Promotion ==
In My Feelings was supported by the lead single "Finish Her!" featuring Wnnr and DJ Accident Report, released on March 1, 2018. The EP's second single, "Brujería" featuring Mitch Ferrino, was released on May 7, 2018.

== Track listing ==
Credits adapted from the iTunes Store. All songs written by Aja.

No.	Title	Length
1.	"Finish Her!" (featuring Wnnr and DJ Accident Report)	3:45
2.	"Brujería" (featuring Mitch Ferrino)	3:32
3.	"Bitch I'm Kawaii" (featuring Accident Report and Wnnr)	3:07
4.	"I Don't Wanna Brag" (featuring AVG JO)	4:02
5.	"Art God (In My Feelings)" (featuring Mitch Ferrino)	3:57
6.	"Ayo Sis" (featuring Mitch Ferrino)	2:52
Total length:		21:15
