= Lila Star =

American singer-songwriter

- Born: July 10; Chicago, Illinois, U.S.
- Education: Truman University; The Second City
- Occupations: Actress, cosmetologist, recording artist, performer
- Years active: 2011–present

Lila Martinez (born July 10) also known as Lila Star Escada and known professionally as Lila Star is an American transgender actress, cosmetologist, recording artist, pageant competitor, and performer. She is known for being "the world's first transsexual Latina rapper."

== Early life and education ==
Lila Star was born as Lila Martinez in Chicago, Illinois. She lived in the Humboldt Park area until the age of eight when she moved to the Albany Park area, where she currently resides. She graduated from Roosevelt High School and attended Truman University. She also briefly attended The Second City.

== Career ==
Lila has been performing for many years as an illusionist at bars and nightclubs in Chicago's Boystown district. She is set cast at The Baton Show Lounge and Kit Kat Lounge and Supper Club, where she is known for her impersonations of: Lil' Kim, Jennifer Lopez, and Toni Braxton. In 2011 Lila made her debut on the rap music scene with the release of her hip-hop single, I'm a Killa. She has since self-released the singles The Truth and Feeling Like Cunt. In 2017 Lila appeared on the hip-house song, Cocky with Shea Coulee and The Vixen. The music-video for the song has since amassed over 3 million views on YouTube. On September 23, 2017, Lila's film debut in the neo-noir short film Lakeshore Drive was released for a one-time-only screening at The 400 Theater in Chicago. The movie is about a transsexual escort named Kim, played by Star, who is trying to escape prostitution and a controlling pimp behind. Lila says of her character Kim "I connected with the fact that the character wore sunglasses even at night because she was hiding something," said Star. "I was never comfortable in my own skin, so I would wear sunglasses even at night." Lila will complete her scenes for the 1970s period piece A History of Wise Men after funding is complete.

== Discography ==
=== Singles ===
Year	Title	Album
2011	I'm a Killa	Non-album single
2015	The Truth	Non-album single
2017	Feeling Like Cunt	Non-album single
TBR	Hourglass Body (Runway Walk)	Non-album single

=== Featured appearances ===
Title	Year	Artist(s)	Album
"Cocky" (featuring Lila Star)	2017	Shea Coulee & The Vixen	Couleé-D
"Ni Santa (Remix)" (featuring Lila Star)	2018	Lester Rey	TBA

== Filmography ==
Year	Title	Role	Notes
2017	Lakeshore Drive	Kim	Short film, film debut
2019	TranHeist	Morgan	Short film, lead role
2019	A History of Wise Men	Geneve	Short film, supporting role

=== Television ===
Year	Title	Role	Notes
2015	The Jerry Springer Show	Herself	Episode: "Hush Hush Affairs"
