= Hey Qween! =

Talk show hosted by Jonny McGovern

- Genre: Talk show
- Presented by: Jonny McGovern; Lady Red Couture (org. s1-s8)
- Country of origin: United States
- Original language: English
- No. of series: 9 (Original); 1 (Revival)

Production
- Running time: 30–41 minutes
- Production companies: Hey Qween! (2014-2021); World of Wonder (2024–present)

Original release
- Network: YouTube (2014-2021); WOW Presents Plus (2024–present)

Hey Qween! is a talk show series hosted by Jonny McGovern, first broadcast on YouTube from 2014 to 2021, then revived on WOW Presents Plus in 2024. The first eight seasons were co-hosted by Lady Red Couture prior to her death in 2020. A blend of "gay web series" and LGBTQ talk show, Hey Qween! often features contestants from RuPaul's Drag Race as guests.

== History ==
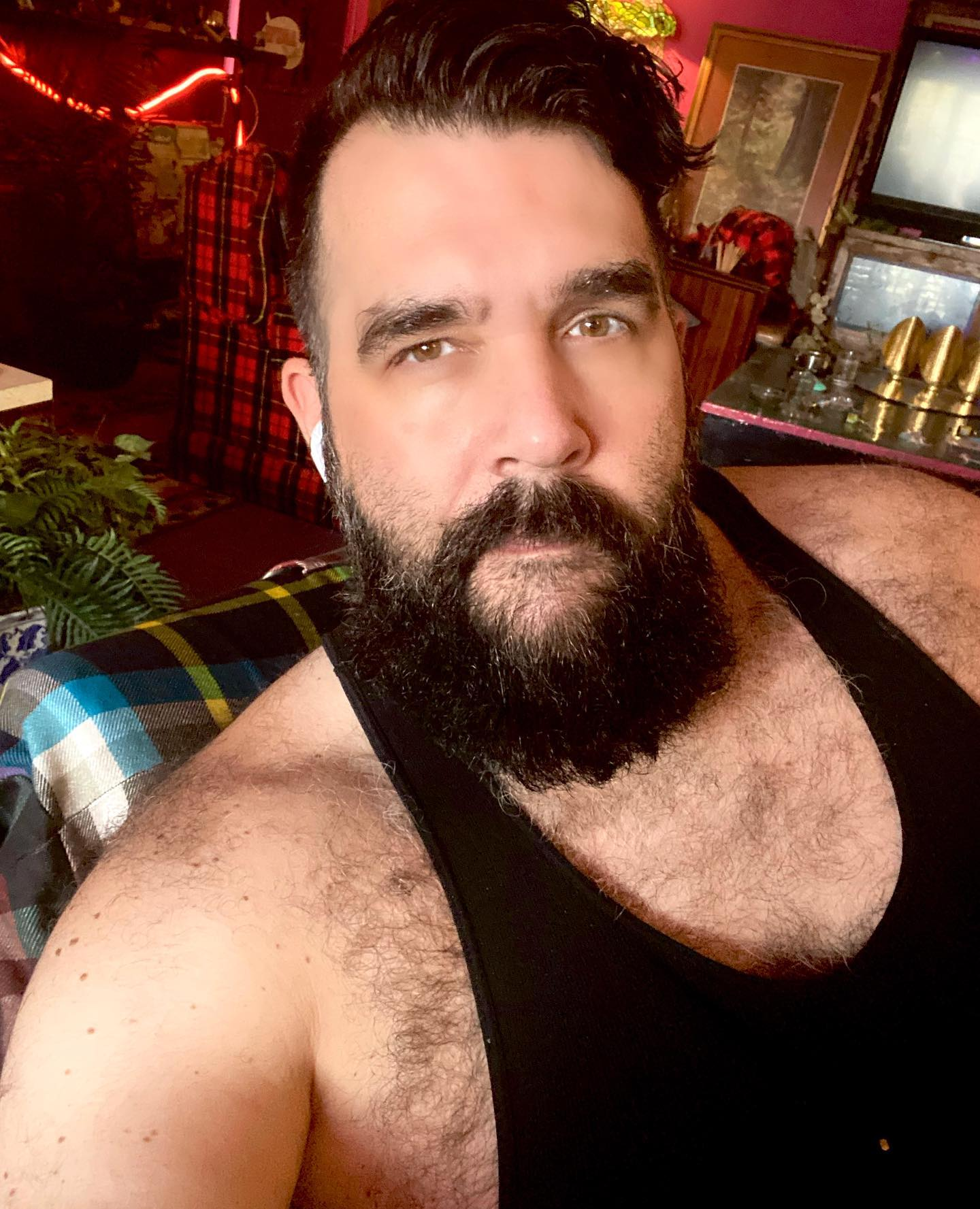
Jonny McGovern

Before her death, the series was co-hosted by Lady Red Couture. Many contestants from RuPaul's Drag Race have appeared on the show, including Alexis Mateo, Cynthia Lee Fontaine, Dax ExclamationPoint, Honey Davenport, Mo Heart, Nina Bo'nina Brown, Ongina, and The Vixen. Dita Von Teese has also appeared on the show.

=== 2014–2021: YouTube ===
The series began airing in 2014 on YouTube. Various drag entertainers, including RuPaul's Drag Race alumni would appear as the guests on the show, usually talking about their drag career.

=== 2024: WOW Presents Plus ===
As season 16 of RuPaul's Drag Race began airing on January 5, 2024, Hey Qween! moved to WOW Presents Plus, a subscription-based streaming service owned by World of Wonder, the production company behind RuPaul's Drag Race. McGovern continued hosting the show, interviewing the contestants of season 16. The episodes aired weekly following the order of the contestants' eliminations, starting with an interview with the first eliminated contestant, Hershii LiqCour-Jeté, released on January 22, 2024. Jamal Sims and Raven filled in as guests during the weeks when season 16 did not feature an elimination. Each episode featured a short intro by Kevin Aviance.

== Episodes ==
=== Original ===
==== Season 1 (2014) ====
No. overall	No. in season	Title	Original release date
1	1	"Calpernia Addams"	May 19, 2014
2	2	"RuPaul"	May 26, 2014
3	3	"Miles Davis Moody"	June 2, 2014
4	4	"Frank DeCaro"	June 10, 2014
5	5	"Alec Mapa"	June 17, 2014
6	6	"Detox"	June 24, 2014
7	7	"Paul Iacono & Darren Stein"	June 30, 2014
8	8	"Jake Shears"	June 30, 2014
9	9	"Willam Belli"	July 14, 2014
10	10	"Jackie Beat"	July 21, 2014
11	11	"Andrew Christian"	July 28, 2014
12	12	"Where the Bears Are"	August 11, 2014
13	13	"Christopher Daniels"	August 18, 2014
14	14	"10 Year Plan: Cast & Director"	August 18, 2014
15	15	"Chi Chi LaRue"	August 25, 2014
16	16	"Alaska Thunderfuck"	September 1, 2014
17	17	"Our Lady J"	September 8, 2014
18	18	"Madison Hinton"	September 15, 2014

==== Season 2 (2014-15) ====
No. overall	No. in season	Title	Original release date
19	1	"Courtney Act"	October 13, 2014
20	2	"Michelle Visage"	October 20, 2014
21	3	"Pandora Boxx"	October 27, 2014
22	4	"Sam Pancake"	November 3, 2014
23	5	"Mitch Vaughn"	October 10, 2014
24	6	"Drew Droege"	October 17, 2014
25	7	"Big Dipper"	October 24, 2014
26	8	"Peaches Christ"	December 1, 2014
27	9	"Manila Luzon"	December 8, 2014
28	10	"Raven"	December 22, 2014
29	11	"Laganja Estranga"	January 5, 2015
30	12	"Guy Branum"	January 12, 2015
31	13	"Boomer Banks"	January 19, 2015
32	14	"Jodie Harsh"	Unknown
33	15	"Unknown"	Unknown
34	16	"Candis Cayne"	January 27, 2015

==== Season 3 (2015) ====
No. overall	No. in season	Title	Original release date
35	1	"Trixie Mattel"	May 5, 2015
36	2	"Latrice Royale"	May 12, 2015
37	3	"Coco Peru"	May 17, 2015
38	4	"Mathu Andersen"	May 10, 2015
39	5	"Adore Delano"	May 20, 2015
40	6	"RuPaul's Drag Race Pit Crew"	June 10, 2015
41	7	"Steve Grand"	June 16, 2015
42	8	"Raja"	June 20, 2015
43	9	"Jasmine Masters"	June 22, 2015
44	10	"Buck Angel"	June 29, 2015
45	11	"Jiz"	July 6, 2015
46	12	"Day Drunk Gays & AB Soto"	July 13, 2015
47	13	"Morgan McMichaels"	July 20, 2015
48	14	"Jessica Wild"	July 27, 2015
49	15	"Wendy Ho"	August 3, 2015
50	16	"Shangela"	August 10, 2015
51	17	"Shane Dawson"	August 17, 2015
52	18	"Frankie Grande"	August 24, 2015
53	19	"Jessica Sutta"	August 31, 2015
54	20	"Miles Jai"	September 7, 2015
55	21	"Daniel Franzese"	September 14, 2015
56	22	"Delta Work"	September 21, 2015
57	23	"Jai Rodriguez"	September 28, 2015
58	24	"Tammie Brown"	October 5, 2015
59	25	"Tyra Sanchez"	October 12, 2015

==== Season 4 (2016) ====
No. overall	No. in season	Title	Original release date
60	1	"Sharon Needles"	February 15, 2016
61	2	"Kennedy Davenport"	February 22, 2016
62	3	"Heklina"	February 29, 2016
63	4	"Mrs. Kasha Davis"	March 7, 2016
64	5	"Milan Christopher"	March 14, 2016
65	6	"Gia Gunn"	March 21, 2016
66	7	"Mimi Imfurst & Love Connie"	March 28, 2016
67	8	"Jaidynn Diore Fierce"	April 4, 2016
68	9	"Sherry Vine"	April 11, 2016
69	10	"Trinity K. Bonet"	April 18, 2016
70	11	"Katya"	April 25, 2016
71	12	"James St. James"	May 2, 2016
72	13	"Tempest DuJour"	May 9, 2016
73	14	"Bruce Vilanch"	May 16, 2016
74	15	"Justin Tranter"	May 23, 2016
75	16	"Kelly Mantle"	May 30, 2016
76	17	"Biblegirl & Boulet Brothers"	June 6, 2016
77	18	"Kitty Meow"	June 13, 2016
78	19	"Glamorous Monique"	June 13, 2016
79	20	"Jiggly Caliente"	June 20, 2016
80	21	"Liam Riley & Ben Baur"	June 27, 2016
81	22	"Phi Phi O'Hara"	July 4, 2016
82	23	"Jackée Harry"	July 11, 2016
83	24	"Bob the Drag Queen"	July 28, 2016

==== Season 5 (2017) ====
No. overall	No. in season	Title	Original release date
84	1	"Alaska Thunderfuck"	March 6, 2017
85	2	"Katya & Trixie Mattel"	March 13, 2017
86	3	"Dragula Reunion"	March 20, 2017
87	4	"Cynthia Lee Fontaine"	April 3, 2017
88	5	"Elijah Daniel & Christine Sydelko"	March 27, 2017
89	6	"Jinkx Monsoon"	April 24, 2017
90	7	"Robbie Turner"	May 1, 2017
91	8	"Dita Von Teese"	May 8, 2017
92	9	"Trevor Moran"	May 15, 2017
93	10	"Derrick Barry"	May 22, 2017
94	11	"Mariah Balenciaga"	May 29, 2017
95	12	"Kingsley"	August 21, 2017
96	13	"Naysha Lopez"	June 12, 2017
97	14	"Isis King"	June 19, 2017
98	15	"Kandy Ho"	July 24, 2017
99	16	"Daniel Preda"	July 31, 2017
100	17	"Ongina"	July 10, 2017
101	18	"Johnny Scruff"	July 17, 2017
102	19	"Porkchop Parker & Nina Bo'Nina Brown"	June 5, 2017
103	20	"Laila McQueen"	August 7, 2017
104	21	"Erickatoure"	June 26, 2017
105	22	"Will & RJ"	July 3, 2017
106	23	"Stef Sanjati"	August 14, 2017
107	24	"Karen from Finance"	July 3, 2017
108	25	"Tyra Sanchez"	August 28, 2017
109	26	"Manila Luzon"	September 11, 2017
110	27	"Ginger Minj"	September 4, 2017

==== Season 6 (2018) ====
No. overall	No. in season	Title	Original release date
111	1	"Aja"	January 29, 2018
112	2	"Farrah Moan"	February 5, 2018
113	3	"Alexis Michelle"	February 12, 2018
114	4	"Charlie Hides"	February 19, 2018
115	5	"Darienne Lake"	February 26, 2018
116	6	"Candis Cayne & Linda Bradford"	March 5, 2018
117	7	"Lisa Ann (Special)"	March 9, 2018
118	8	"Dida Ritz"	March 12, 2018
119	9	"Kimora Blac"	March 19, 2018
120	10	"Acid Betty"	March 26, 2018
121	11	"Larry Tee"	April 2, 2018
122	12	"Detox"	April 9, 2018
123	13	"Detox & Vicky Vox"	April 16, 2018
124	14	"Stacy Layne Matthews"	April 23, 2018
125	15	"Jaymes Mansfield"	April 30, 2018
126	16	"Trinity Taylor"	May 7, 2018
127	17	"Venus D'Lite"	May 14, 2018
128	18	"Bob the Drag Queen"	May 21, 2018
129	19	"Trannika Rex"	May 28, 2018
130	20	"Brent Corrigan"	June 4, 2018
131	21	"Soju (Special)"	June 6, 2018
132	22	"Jiggly Caliente"	June 11, 2018
133	23	"DragCon LA 2018 (Special)"	June 18, 2018
134	24	"Ross Mathews"	June 25, 2018
135	25	"Varla Jean Merman"	July 2, 2018
136	26	"Kennedy Davenport"	July 9, 2018
137	27	"Mayhem Miller"	July 16, 2018

==== Hey Qween! Beach House (2018) ====
No. overall	No. in season	Title	Original release date
138	1	"Shea Couleé"	July 30, 2018
139	2	"Dusty Ray Bottoms"	August 6, 2018
140	3	"Pearl"	August 13, 2018
141	4	"Kameron Michaels"	August 20, 2018
142	5	"Sonique"	August 27, 2018
143	6	"Miss Vanjie"	September 3, 2018
144	-	"HalloQween Special"	October 29, 2018
145	-	"A Very Green Christmas!"	December 17, 2018

==== Season 7 (2019) ====
No. overall	No. in season	Title	Original release date
146	1	"BenDeLaCreme"	March 11, 2019
147	2	"The Vixen"	March 18, 2019
148	3	"Alexis Mateo"	March 25, 2019
149	4	"Eureka O'Hara"	April 1, 2019
150	5	"Delta Work"	April 8, 2019
151	6	"Jackie Beat & Sherry Vine"	April 15, 2018
152	7	"Carmen Carrera"	April 22, 2019
153	8	"Nicole Paige Brooks"	April 29, 2019
154	9	"Jasmine Masters"	May 6, 2019
155	10	"Rhea Litre"	May 13, 2019
156	11	"Dax ExclamationPoint"	May 20, 2019
157	12	"Gia Gunn"	May 27, 2019

==== Hey Qween! Pride (2019) ====
No. overall	No. in season	Title	Original release date
158	1	"Trixie Mattel"	June 28, 2019
159	2	"Milk"	July 5, 2019
160	3	"Blair St. Clair"	July 12, 2019
161	4	"Farrah Moan"	July 19, 2019
162	5	"Mayhem Miller"	July 26, 2019
163	6	"Latrice Royale"	August 2, 2019
164	-	"Halloween Special: Raja"	October 30, 2019

==== Season 8 (2019-20) ====
No. overall	No. in season	Title	Original release date
165	1	"Gigi Gorgeous"	December 9, 2019
166	2	"Ariel Versace"	December 16, 2019
167	3	"Holiday Special: Peppermint"	December 23, 2019
168	4	"Valentina"	January 13, 2020
169	5	"Monique Heart"	January 20, 2020
170	6	"Honey Davenport"	January 27, 2020
171	7	"Shannel"	February 3, 2020
172	8	"Mercedes Iman Diamond"	February 10, 2020
173	9	"Loris"	February 17, 2020
174	10	"Scarlet Envy"	February 24, 2020
175	11	"Soju"	May 20, 2019
176	12	"Coco Montrese & Kahanna Montrese"	March 16, 2020

==== Hey Qween! Qweens Around the Country (2020) ====
No. overall	No. in season	Title	Original release date
177	1	"Ariel Versace"	May 7, 2020
178	2	"Delta Work"	May 12, 2020
179	3	"Darienne Lake"	May 19, 2020
180	4	"Erickatoure"	May 21, 2020
181	5	"Peppermint"	April 8, 2019
182	6	"Shuga Cain"	May 26, 2020
183	7	"Heidi N Closet"	May 27, 2020
184	8	"Kasha Davis"	June 2, 2020

==== Hey Qween! Pride 2020 (2020) ====
No. overall	No. in season	Title	Original release date
185	1	"Latrice Royale"	June 11, 2020
186	2	"The Vixen"	June 16, 2020
187	3	"Honey Davenport"	June 29, 2020
188	4	"Monique Heart"	July 6, 2020

==== Season 9 (2020-21) ====
No. overall	No. in season	Title	Original release date
189	0	"The Lady Red Memorial Special"	November 24, 2020
190	1	"Heidi N Closet"	November 30, 2020
191	2	"Silky Nutmeg Ganache"	December 7, 2020
192	3	"Vander Von Odd"	December 14, 2020
193	4	"Holiday Special!"	December 21, 2020
194	5	"Gigi Goode"	January 11, 2021
195	6	"Tammie Brown"	January 18, 2021
196	7	"Mariah Balenciaga"	January 25, 2021
197	8	"Alexis Mateo"	February 1, 2021
198	9	"Brooke Lynn Hytes"	February 8, 2021
199	10	"Melissa Befierce"	February 15, 2021
200	11	"Manila Luzon"	February 22, 2021
201	12	"Eddie Danger"	March 1, 2021
202	13	"Laganja Estranja"	March 8, 2021
203	14	"Mario Diaz"	March 15, 2021
204	15	"Glen Alen"	March 22, 2021
205	16	"Maebe A. Girl"	March 29, 2021
206	17	"Sasha Colby"	April 5, 2021
207	18	"Julie and Brandy"	April 12, 2021
208	19	"Landon Cider"	April 19, 2021
209	20	"Widow Von'Du"	April 26, 2021
210	21	"Calpernia"	May 3, 2021
211	22	"Biqtch Puddin'"	May 10, 2021
212	23	"Isis King"	May 17, 2021
213	24	"Michael Henry"	May 24, 2021
214	25	"Adam Joseph and Erickatoure"	May 31, 2021

=== WOW Presents Plus Revival ===
==== Season 1 (2024) ====
No. overall	No. in season	Title	Length	Original release date
1	1	"Hershii LiqCour-Jeté"	34:21	January 22, 2024
2	2	"Mirage"	32:56	January 29, 2024
3	3	"Amanda Tori Meating"	34:10	February 5, 2024
4	4	"Geneva Karr"	33:11	February 12, 2024
5	5	"Megami"	30:28	February 19, 2024
6	6	"Xunami Muse"	40:46	February 26, 2024
7	7	"Plasma"	38:00	March 4, 2024
8	8	"Jamal Sims"	39:46	March 11, 2024
9	9	"Mhi'ya Iman Le'Paige"	40:27	March 18, 2024
10	10	"Dawn"	39:07	March 25, 2024
11	11	"Morphine Love Dion"	41:29	April 1, 2024
12	12	"Q"	40:27	April 8, 2024
13	13	"Raven"	37:17	April 15, 2024
14	14	"Plane Jane"	43:13	April 22, 2024
15	15	"Sapphira Cristál"	42:06	April 26, 2024
16	16	"Nymphia Wind"	47:36	April 29, 2024

==== Season 2 - LIVE from RuPaul's DragConLA (2024) ====
No. overall	No. in season	Title	Length	Original release date
17	1	"Jimbo"	20:25	November 25, 2024
18	2	"Ra'Jah O'Hara"	21:42	December 2, 2024
19	3	"Lolita Banana"	23:42	December 9, 2024
20	4	"LaLa Ri"	20:26	December 16, 2024
21	5	"Envy Peru"	19:27	December 23, 2024
22	6	"Kita Mean"	16:42	December 30, 2024
