= The Mother of All Balls =

- RuPaul's Drag Race episode
- Episode no.: Season 16; Episode 3
- Presented by: RuPaul
- Original air date: January 18, 2024

Episode chronology
← Previous "Queen Choice Awards"	Next → "RDR Live!"

"The Mother of All Balls" is the third episode of the sixteenth season of the American television series RuPaul's Drag Race. It originally aired on January 18, 2024. The episode's main challenge tasks the contestants with presenting three looks in a ball (fashion show), including made in the Werk Room. American fashion designer Isaac Mizrahi is a guest judge. Hershii LiqCour-Jeté is eliminated from the competition after placing in the bottom and losing a lip-sync contest against Geneva Karr to "Maybe You're the Problem" by Ava Max.

== Episode ==
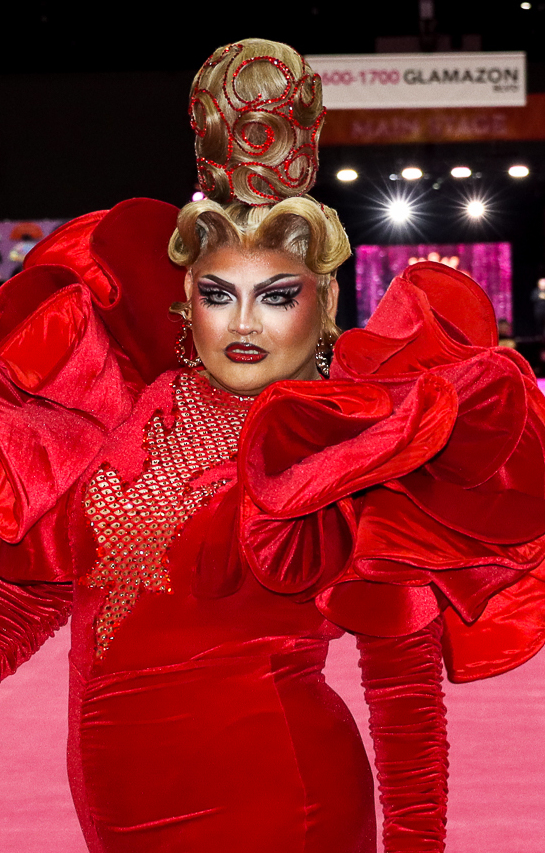
Geneva Karr (pictured at RuPaul's DragCon LA in 2024) wins the episode's main challenge.

A group of seven contestants return to the Werk Room. Seven additional contestants enter, merging the two groups. The contestants get acquainted. On a new day, RuPaul greets the group and reveals the twist of the season: as the winners of the first two episodes, Plane Jane and Sapphira Cristál will hold the power of the Immunity Potions. This power can only be used once during the competition, and the owner will be able to decide whether to use immunity to save themself or another contestant. RuPaul then reveals the main challenge, which tasks the contestants with walking the Mother of All Balls, presenting two looks brought from home and one made in the Werk Room. The categories are "Mother Goose" (an outfit inspired by a classic nursery rhyme), "Significant Mother" (an outfit inspired by a favorite famous mother), and "Call Me Mother/Father Eleganza" (a "mother of the ball" outfit made from menswear such as bandanas, jeans, suits, and ties).

The contestants gather their materials and begin to create their outfits. RuPaul returns to the Werk Room to meet with the contestants, asking questions and offering advice. Before leaving, RuPaul says the contestants will be rating each other via Rate-A-Queen again, before the judges deliver their critiques. RuPaul also leaves the Rate-A-Queen results from the first two weeks. The group reviews the Rate-A-Queen results, then continue to prepare for the fashion show.

On elimination day, the contestants make final preparations in the Werk Room. Some of the contestants teach Nymphia Wind some Spanish phrases. On the main stage, RuPaul welcomes fellow judges Michelle Visage and Carson Kressley, as well as guest judge Isaac Mizrahi. RuPaul shares the assignment of the main challenge. The contestants present their looks, then rank each other using Rate-A-Queen. RuPaul asks Plane Jane and Sapphira Cristál if they would like to use their Immunity Potion. Both decline. RuPaul then shares the Rate-A-Queen results. Nymphia Wind, Q, and Sapphira Cristál place in the top. Geneva Karr, Hershii LiqCour-Jeté, and Mhi'ya Iman Le'Paige place in the bottom. The judges deliver their critiques. Nymphia Wind is declared the winner. Geneva Karr and Hershii LiqCour-Jeté place in the bottom and face off in a lip-sync contest to "Maybe You're the Problem" (2022) by Ava Max. Geneva Karr wins the lip-sync and Hershii LiqCour-Jeté is eliminated from the competition.

== Production and broadcast ==
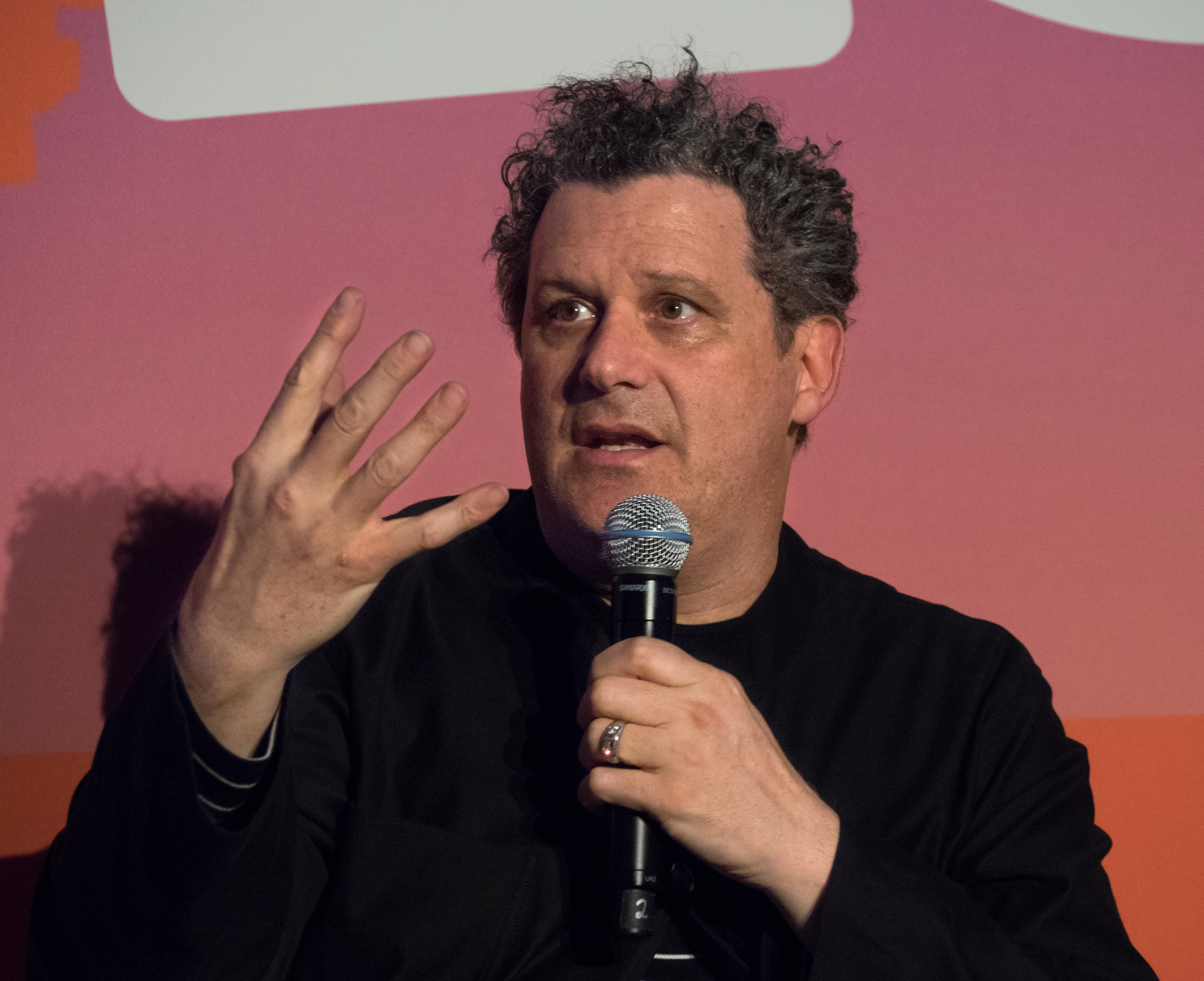
Isaac Mizrahi is a guest judge.

The episode originally aired on January 18, 2024. It features the season's first true elimination challenge and its first design challenge.

McKinley Franklin of Screen Rant said Nymphia Wind "arguably blew all her competitors out of the water" with her third look in the fashion show, creating "an incredible ensemble defined by many structured men's ties".

Hershii LiqCour-Jeté's exit line is "It's chocolate!"

=== Fashion ===
For the category "Mother Goose", Geneva Karr's outfit is inspired by Little Miss Muffet. Inspired by Cushy Cow, Dawn has a red outfit, hoofed feet, and horns. Inspired by Burnie Bee, Hershii LiqCour-Jeté wears a black-and-yellow outfit and a short wig. Mirage is inspired by Baa, Baa, Black Sheep and has a black outfit and a dark wig. Megami presents a blue-and-purple look inspired by Little Bo-Peep. She carries a shepherd's crook. Amanda Tori Meating wears an outfit with multiple plush cats inspired by Little Pussy. Morphine Love Dion has a black-and-white outfit inspired by A Man and a Maid. Inspired by Mary's Canary, Mhi'ya Iman Le'Paige wears a yellow outfit with feathers. Inspired by The Man in the Moon, Q has a black-and-gold outfit with a moon-shaped headpiece. Inspired by Little Boy Blue, Nymphia Wind wears a blue-and-gold outfit with blue shoes and matching hat. Sapphira Cristál presents a look inspired by Peter, Peter, Pumpkin Eater. She wears a large outfit shaped like a pumpkin and a dark wig. Inspired by Pussycat by the Fire, Plane Jane wears a purple outfit with fur accessories. Xunami Muse's look is inspired by Humpty Dumpty. She emerges from an egg wearing a white outfit with a yolk. Plasma has a blue-and-pink plaid outfit inspired by Tweedledum and Tweedledee, with a matching hat.

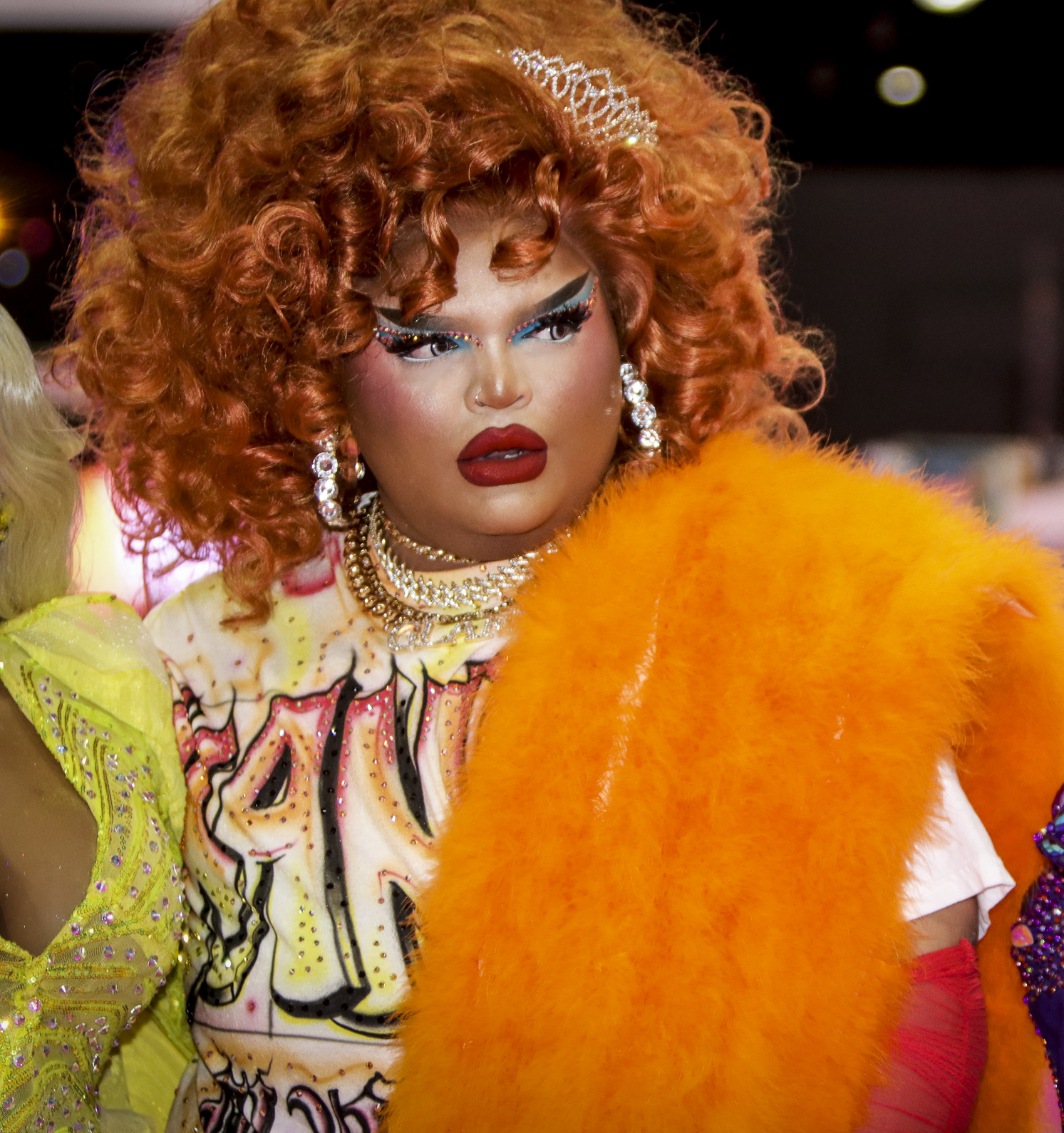
Xunami Muse recreates the entrance look of her "drag mother" Kandy Muse (pictured in 2022), who competed on the show's thirteenth season.

For "Significant Mother", Geneva Karr has a black outfit inspired by Selma Hayek. She wears a dark wig. Inspired by Audrey Hepburn, Dawn has a black outfit with a long white sash and a matching hat. Hershii LiqCour-Jeté wears a blue-and-yellow latex outfit inspired by Mother Nature, with a blue wig. Inspired by La Llorona, Mirage has a black-and-tan outfit and a long wig. Megami presents a white outfit inspired by Lady Gaga, with matching footwear. Amanda Tori Meating wears a tearaway outfit inspired by Visage, with large hoop earrings and a white streak in her dark wig. Inspired by Kris Jenner, Mophine Love Dion has a black outfit, pearl necklaces, and a short dark wig. Mhi'ya Iman Le'Paige wears a green outfit inspired by Lil' Kim, with a short blonde wig. Q recreates Judy Garland's poppy dress and has a short dark wig. Inspired by Angelina Jolie, Nymphia Wind wears a white wedding dress that has been painted by friends and family in Taiwan. Sapphira Cristál has an outfit inspired by Eve, with long braids. Inspired by Octomom, Plane Jane carries many dolls and lets one fall from between her legs. She has a dark wig. Xunami Muse recreates the blue-colored entrance look of her "drag mother" Kandy Muse, who competed on the thirteenth season. She carries boombox. Plasma wears a yellow outfit inspired by Anne Boleyn.

For "Call Me Mother/Father Eleganza", Geneva Karr wears a short blue-and-brown dress. Dawn has a construction worker-inspired colorful outfit with a cape. She wears orange boots and a long dark wig. Hershii LiqCour-Jeté has a spring green-colored outfit with orange high-heeled shoes and a dark wig. Mirage wears a green outfit and a brown wig. Megami has a Rosie the Riveter-inspired outfit with a bandana in her dark wig. Amanda Tori Meating wears a woman-in-the-workplace outfit with a blonde wig. Morphine Love Dion has a denim outfit with a matching witch hat. Mhi'ya Iman Le'Paige has a plaid outfit and a long wig. Q wears a Vivienne Westwood-inspired black-and-white outfit and a blonde wig. Nymphia Wind's colorful outfit is made from many ties. She wears yellow boots and a blonde wig. Sapphira Cristál has an overalls-inspired outfit with yellow plaid and a large red wig. Plane Jane wears a short black skirt and a large curly wig. Xunami Muse has an outfit with plaid, argyle socks, and a brown wig. Plasma as a pinstripe gown and a blonde wig.

== Reception ==
Jason P. Frank of Vulture rated the episode four out of five stars. Stephen Daw of Billboard ranked the "Maybe You're the Problem" performance number 19 in a 2024 list of the season's lip-syncs.
