= Lip Sync LaLaPaRuza Smackdown – Reunited =

- RuPaul's Drag Race episode
- Episode no.: Season 16; Episode 15
- Original air date: April 12, 2024

Episode chronology
← Previous "Booked and Blessed"	Next → "Grand Finale"

"Lip Sync LaLaPaRuza Smackdown – Reunited" is the fifteenth episode of the sixteenth season of the American television series RuPaul's Drag Race. It originally aired on April 12, 2024. The episode sees the season's eliminated contestants return to competed in a series of lip-sync contests for a prize of $50,000. Morphine Love Dion wins the tournament.

== Episode ==
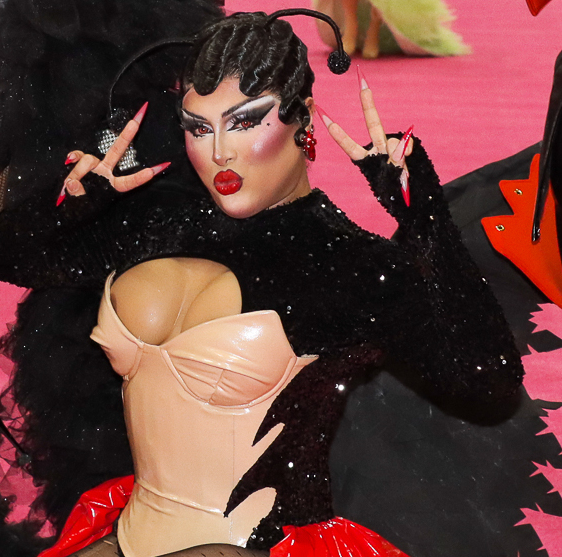
For winning the series of lip-sync contests, Morphine Love Dion (pictured at RuPaul's DragCon LA in 2024) was named the "Queen of She Done Already Done Had Herses".

The current and eliminated contestants reunite in the Werk Room. On the main stage, RuPaul welcomes fellow judges Michelle Visage and Ts Madison. The eliminated participate in a series of lip-sync contests called the Lip Sync LaLaPaRuza Smackdown, the winner of which will receive a $50,000 prize and be crowned as the "Queen of She Done Already Done Had Herses". For most of the lip-syncs a contestant is chosen at random, who gets to select their opponent. Their opponent then gets to choose the lip-sync song.

First, Dawn chooses to lip-sync against Amanda Tori Meating, who chooses "Damaged" (2008) by Danity Kane. Amanda Tori Meating wins the lip-sync and advances to round 2. In the second contest, Q chooses Megami as her opponent, who selects the song "What About" by Janet Jackson. Megami wins and advances to round 2. In the third lip-sync, Morphine Love Dion chooses Geneva Karr as her opponent, who chooses "Million Dollar Baby" (2022) by Ava Max. Morphine Love Dion wins and advances to round 2. In the fourth contest, Mirage chooses Hershii LiqCour-Jeté as her opponent, who selects "Alone 2.0" (2023) by Kim Petras and Nicki Minaj. Mirage wins and advances to round 2. As the last three remaining contestants, Mhi'ya Iman Le'Paige, Plasma, and Xunami Muse must face off in a lip-sync. Mh'iya Iman Le'Paige is randomly selected to pick the song and chooses "Milkshake" (2003) by Kelis. Mhi'ya Iman Le'Paige wins and advances directly to round 3.

In the first lip-sync of round 2, Amanda Tori Meating chooses Megami as her opponent, who selects "The Shoop Shoop Song" by Cher. Megami wins and advances to round 3. In the second contest of round 2, the two remaining contestants, Mirage and Morphine Love Dion, must lip-sync. Morphine Love Dion is randomly selected to pick the song and chooses "This Time I Know It's for Real" (1989) by Donna Summer. Morphine Love Dion wins and advances to round 3. Before the third round, RuPaul reveals a twist: one of the remaining contestants will be selected at random and she must choose her opponent. The contestant who is not chosen will advance directly to the final round. Megami is selected, and she chooses to lip-sync against Mhi'ya Iman Le'Paige. The two face off in a lip-sync to the remaining song "We Got the Beat" (1982) by The Go-Go's. Megami wins and advances to the final round. In the final round Megami and Morphine Love Dion lip-sync to "Gonna Make You Sweat (Everybody Dance Now)" by C+C Music Factory. Morphine Love Dion wins the tournament.

== Production and broadcast ==
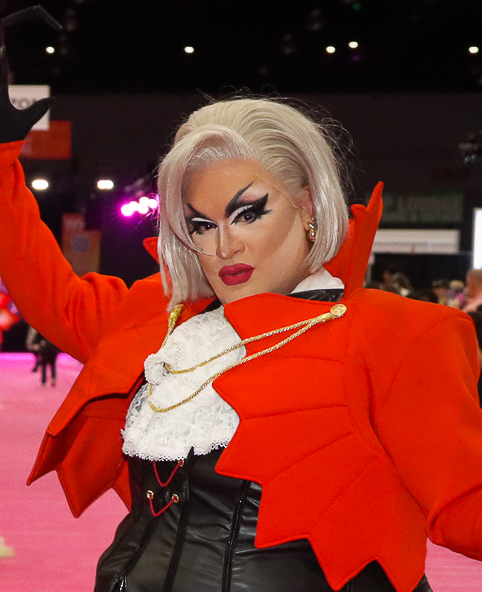
Megami (pictured at RuPaul's DragCon LA in 2024) is the runner-up in the lip-sync tournament.

The episode originally aired on April 12, 2024.

On social media, Dawn provided a "full explanation" as to why she selected to lip-sync against Amanda Tori Meating.

== Reception and impact ==
Stephen Daw ranked "Damaged" number 16, "This Time I Know It's for Real" number 11, "The Shoop Shoop Song" number 10, "We Got the Beat" number 6, and "Gonna Make You Sweat (Everybody Dance Now)" number 4 in Billboard's list of the season's lip-sync performances. He said of "Damaged": "while Dawn's wounded, emotional performance certainly stirred our hearts, our eyes remained fixed on Amanda Tori Meating from start to finish. Showing off her fluid floor work and high-class hairography, Amanda turned Dawn into a sunset by the time this lip sync was over." Daw wrote about "This Time": "While Mirage occasionally stumbled, trying to find her footing in this mid-tempo disco song, Morphine rose to the challenge. Serving up pure sex appeal and leaning hard into the romantic angle of the track, the Miami queen handily earned her spot in the final lip sync of the Lalaparuza." He said of "We Got the Beat":

While Mhi'ya’s usual tactics of splits and flips certainly served her well throughout the number, Megami saw them coming — so much so that she literally predicted one of Mhi'ya's drops in the middle of the song, much to the audience's delight. The Brooklyn queen's mix of genuinely good dance moves, high-comedy performance and perfectly-timed tactics against a lip-sync assassin resulted in a well-deserved win, sending one of the biggest threats of the episode back to the work room".

Former contestant Yvie Oddly praised Megami for her performances in the episode. Yvie Oddly also disagreed with Mh'iya Iman Le'Paige being declared the winner of the three-way lip-sync, preferring Plasma's performance to the others. The song "What About" saw a 273.7 percent increase in streams after the episode aired.
