= RDR Live! (RuPaul's Drag Race season 16) =

- RuPaul's Drag Race episode
- Episode no.: Season 16; Episode 4
- Presented by: RuPaul

Guest appearance
- Sarah Michelle Gellar

Episode chronology
| ← Previous "The Mother of All Balls" | Next → "Girl Groups" |

"RDR Live!" is the fourth episode of the sixteenth season of the American television series RuPaul's Drag Race. It originally aired on January 26, 2024. The episode's main challenge tasks the contestants with performing in a sketch comedy show. The fashion show has contestants recreate looks by American singer and actress Cher. Sarah Michelle Gellar is a guest judge.

Plasma is the winner of the main challenge. Mirage is eliminated from the competition after placing in the bottom and losing a lip-sync contest against Geneva Karr to "Dark Lady" (1974) by Cher.

== Episode ==
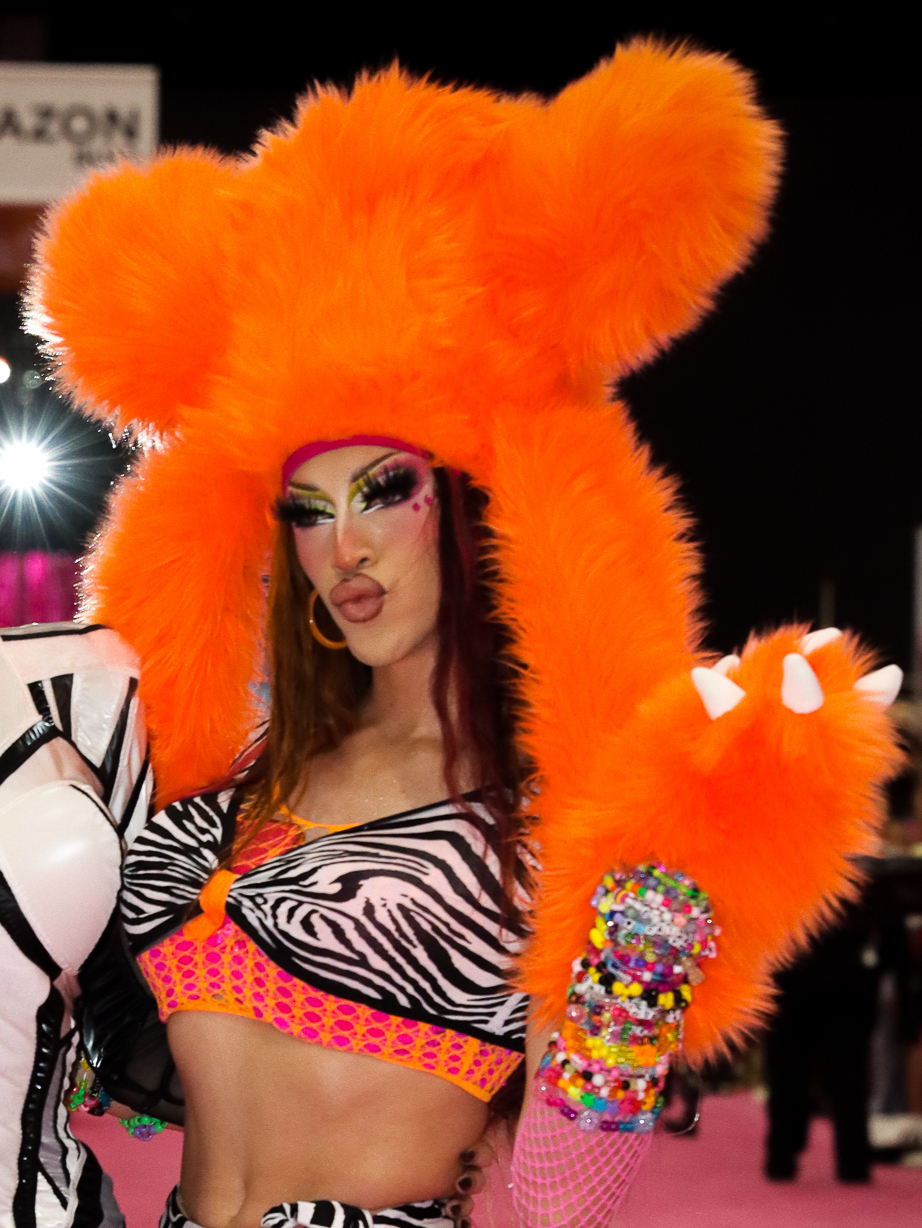
Mirage (pictured in 2024) is eliminated from the competition.

The contestants return to the Werk Room after Hershii LiqCour-Jeté's elimination on the previous episode. The group discuss the tension between Amanda Tori Meating and Plane Jane. On a new day, RuPaul greets the group and reveals the main challenge, which tasks the contestants putting their sketch comedy skills to the test in RDR Live, a show filmed in one take, parodying the television series Saturday Night Live. The contestants review the sketches and characters, then make their selections.

The contestants begin to rehearse. RuPaul and Ross Mathews visit the Werk Room to meet with the contestants, asking questions and offering advice. Before leaving, RuPaul reveals the runway category ("Night of a Thousands Chers"). On elimination day, the contestants make final preparations in the Werk Room. Mirage discusses her indigenous heritage. Geneva Karr and Xunami Muse talk about immigrating to the United States and being DREAMers. Amanda Tori Meating talks about ghostwriting on OnlyFans.

On the main stage, RuPaul welcomes fellow judges Michelle Visage and Mathews, as well as guest judge Sarah Michelle Gellar. RuPaul shares the assignment of the main challenge, then the contestants perform in RDR Live. On the runway, the category is "Everything Every-Cher All at Once", where each queen recreates a different iconic Cher look. After the contestants present their looks, Plane Jane and Sapphira Cristál decline to use their Immunity Potions. The judges deliver their critiques, deliberate, then share the results with the contestants. Plasma is declared the winner of the main challenge. Geneva Karr and Mirage place in the bottom and face off in a lip-sync contest to "Dark Lady" (1974) by Cher. Geneva Karr wins the lip-sync and Mirage is eliminated from the competition.

== Production and broadcast ==
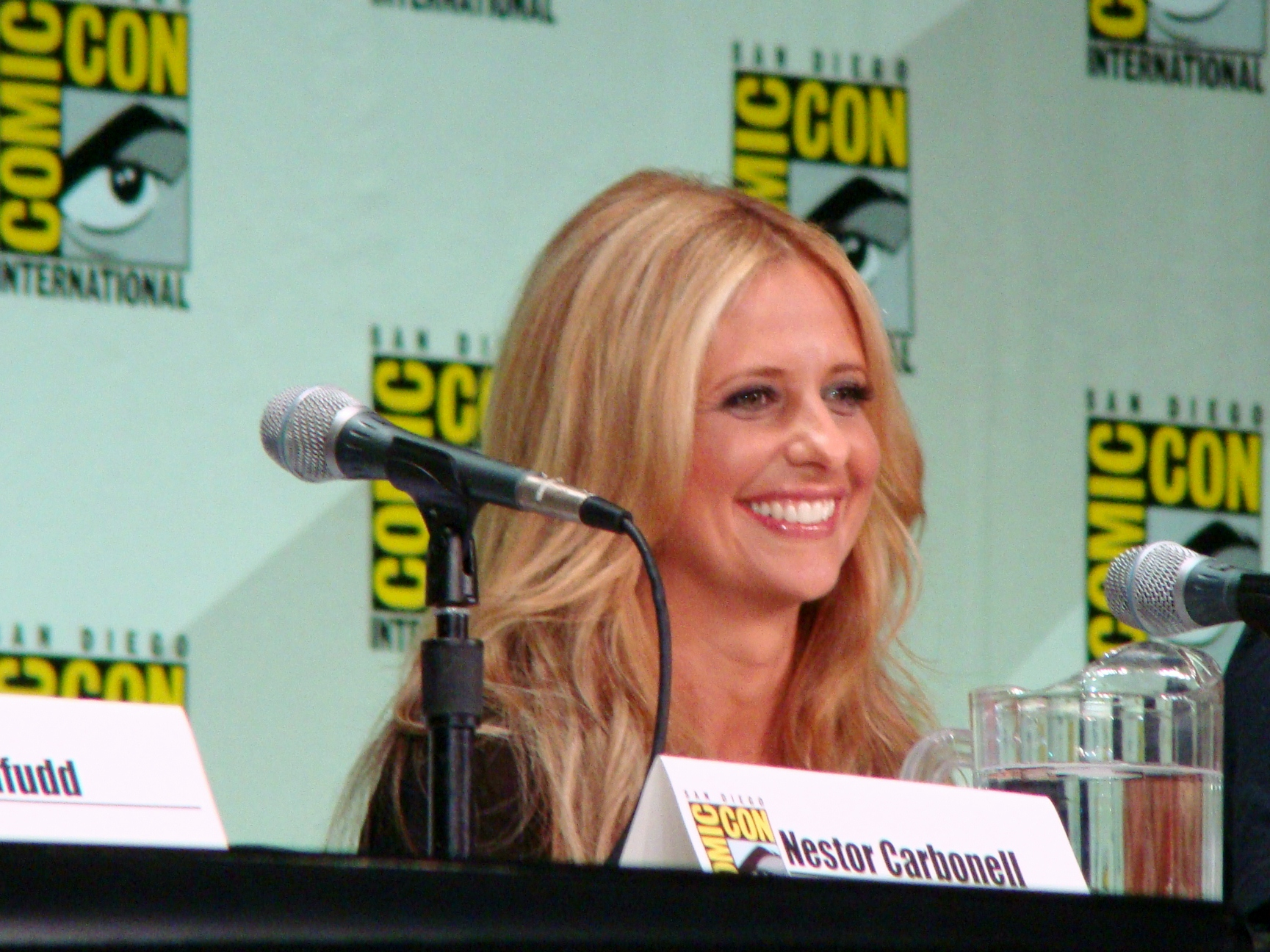
Sarah Michelle Gellar (pictured in 2011) is a guest judge.

The episode originally aired on January 26, 2024.

RDR Live is hosted by Mirage. For the opening sketch, Geneva Karr portrays American politician Lindsey Graham. As the musical guest, RuPaul performs the song "Lady Cowboy". Amanda Tori Meating and Dawn's segment is inspired by Saturday Night Live's parody newscast Weekend Update. Q portrays the brick thrown at the Stonewall riots (1969). Plasma's character is inspired by American singer and actress Barbra Streisand.

Mirage did not know the lyrics to "Dark Lady".

=== Fashion ===
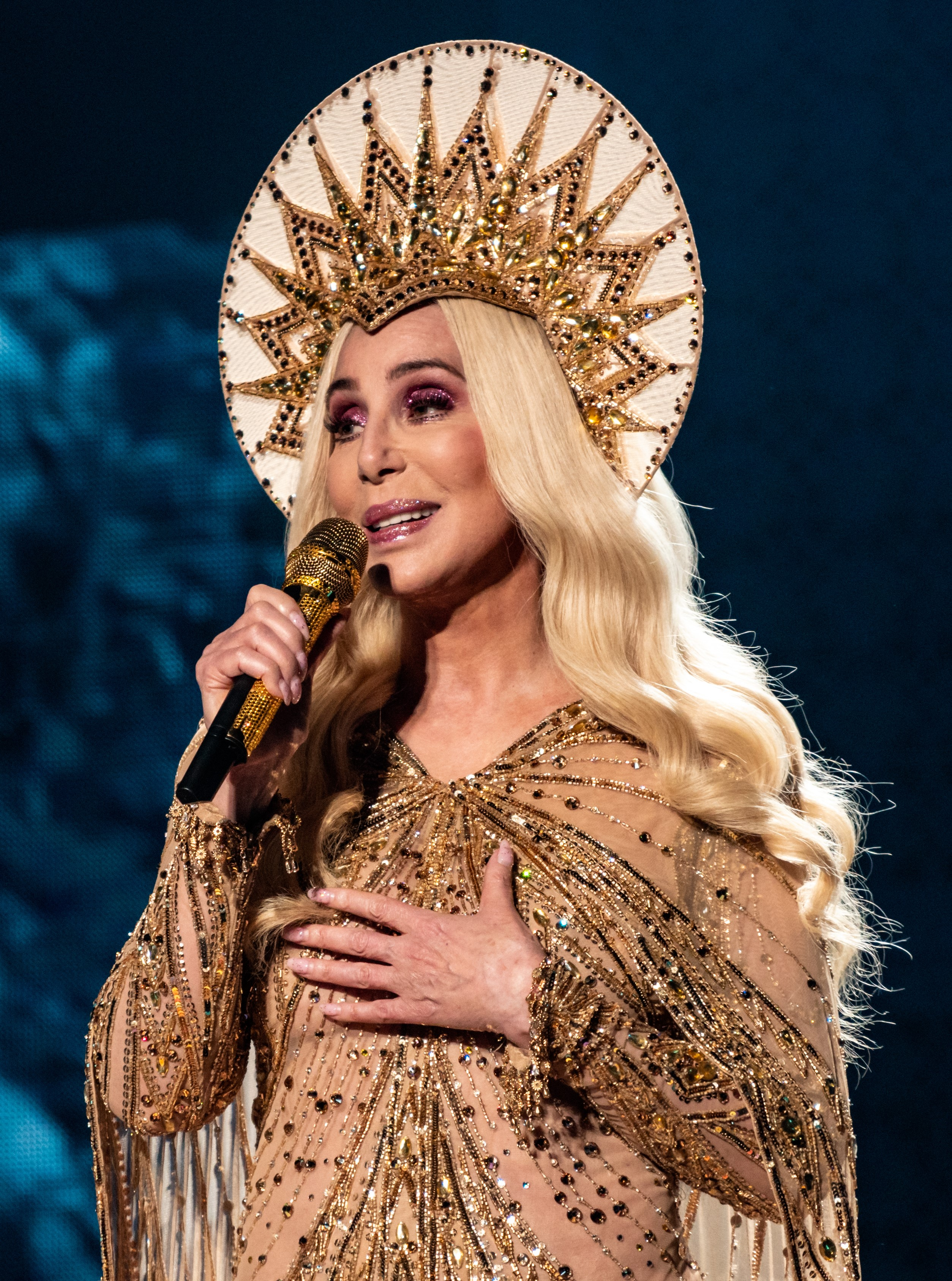
For the fashion show, the contestants recreate looks by Cher (pictured in 2019).

RuPaul wears a gold outfit and a cowboy hat for "Lady Cowboy".

For the fashion show, the contestants recreate different Cher looks. Inspired by the singer's look for Prisoner (1979), Xunami Muse wears a nude illusion with fringe and wings. Inspired by Cher's look for the 60th Academy Awards in 1988, Morphine Love Dion has a black dress with a dark wig. Inspired by Burlesque (2010), Mhi'ya Iman Le'Paige wears a black stoned catsuit and a dark wig. Inspired by Cher's appearance as a ringmaster for Ringling Brothers Circus in 1974, Geneva Karr has a red outfit with a matching hat and long dark wig. Inspired by one of the singer's concert outfits from 1979, Mirage has a purple outfit with a matching headband and a long dark ponytail. Megami wears a black leather outfit with a jacket and a dark wig. Inspired by Cher's Met Gala outfit in 1974, Plane Jane has a sheer mesh white gown with a long dark wig. Inspired by a 2001 Cher doll, Amanda Tori Meating wears a lavender dress with a long dark wig. Inspired by a "mod" Cher look in 1966, Dawn has a blue-and-orange fur coat and a long dark wig. Inspired by one of Cher's looks from The Sonny & Cher Comedy Hour in 1973, Q wears a black-and-white Bob Mackie-inspired dress with a black headpiece with feathers. Inspired by the singer's Meta Gala look in 1985, Plasma has a black Mackie-inspired dress and a dark wig. Inspired by Cher's Egyptian goddess look from 1979, Nymphia Wind wears a colorful outfit with a headpiece. Inspired by Cher's 2017 Las Vegas residency look, Sapphira Cristál wears a blue outfit with a shoulder piece made from feathers, as well as a large afro.

== Reception ==
Jason P. Frank of Vulture rated the episode four out of five stars. Michael Cook of Out South Florida called Mirage's elimination "very emotional". Stephen Daw of Billboard ranked the "Dark Lady" performance number 21 in a list of the season's lip-sync contests. Daw said Mirage's "movement, energy and heel-clacking made for a thrilling performance, save for one fact — she simply did not know any of the words". Bernardo Sim included Mirage's elimination in Pride.com's 2024 list of the show's ten "most heartbreaking" eliminations.

== See also ==
- Cher as a gay icon
- Cultural impact of Cher
