= Rate-A-Queen =

- RuPaul's Drag Race episode
- Episode no.: Season 16; Episode 1
- Directed by: Nick Murray
- Original air date: January 5, 2024

Guest appearances
- Derrick Barry; Charlize Theron

Episode chronology
← Previous "Grand Finale"	Next → "Queen Choice Awards"

"Rate-A-Queen" is the first episode of the sixteenth season of the American television series RuPaul's Drag Race. It originally aired on January 5, 2024. The episode sees contestants perform in a talent show hosted by former competitor Derrick Barry. Charlize Theron is a guest judge.

Sapphira Cristál wins the main challenge and no contestant is eliminated from the competition. The corresponding episode of RuPaul's Drag Race: Untucked earned editors nominations in the Outstanding Picture Editing for an Unstructured Reality Program category at the 76th Primetime Creative Arts Emmy Awards.

== Episode ==
The season's first seven contestants enter the Werk Room individually. RuPaul greets the group and reveals the photo shoot mini-challenge, which tasks contestants with posing for a Ring camera on RuPaul's porch as he watches.

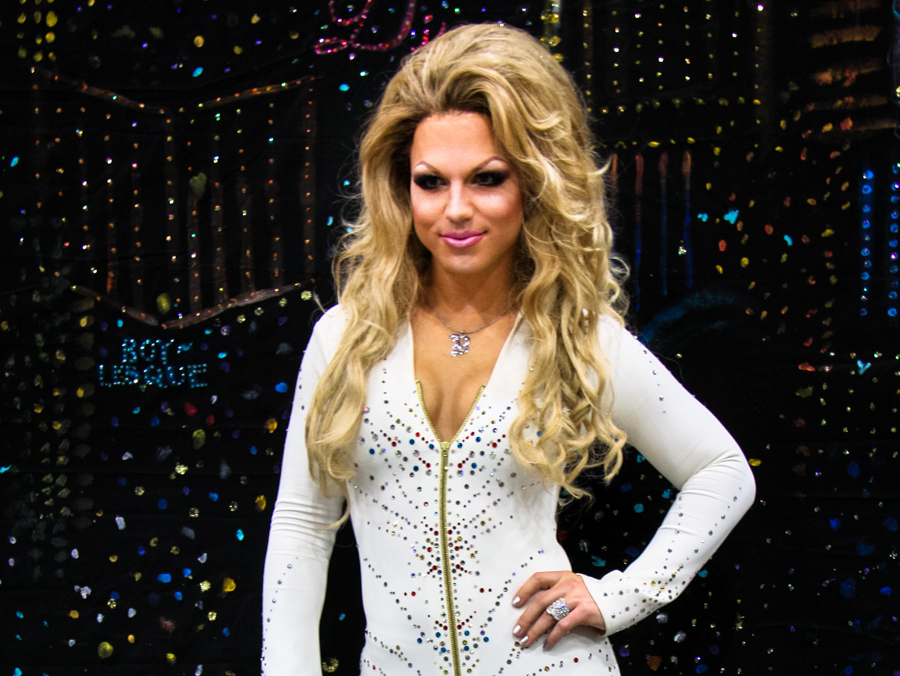
Former contestant Derrick Barry hosts the episode's main challenge, which is a talent show.

Back in the Werk Room, the contestants get out of drag. RuPaul returns and reveals that Sapphira Cristál is the winner of the mini-challenge. RuPaul then reveals the main challenge, which tasks contestants with performing in the "MTV's Spring Break" talent show, hosted by former contestant Derrick Barry. RuPaul shares that the winner of the main challenge will receive immunity and that a twist in the competition will have contestants rate each other. Following are the acts:

- Amanda Tori Meating – original song lip-sync
- Dawn – original song lip-sync
- Mirage – original song lip-sync
- Morphine Love Dion – lip-sync / Baile Folklorico
- Q – puppet ballet show
- Sapphira Cristál – opera singing
- Xunami Muse – original song lip-sync

On the main stage, RuPaul welcomes fellow judges Michelle Visage and Carson Kressley, as well as guest judge Charlize Theron. RuPaul shares the runway category: "RuVeal Yourself". Dawn, Mirage, Q, and Sapphira Cristál receive positive critiques. Amanda Tori Meating, Morphine Love Dion, and Xunami Muse receive negative critiques. The contestants rank each other using the Rate-A-Queen system. Q and Sapphira Cristál receive the highest placements, making them the top two contestants of the week who will face off in a lip-sync contest to "Break My Soul" (2022) by Beyoncé for the win. Sapphira Cristál is declared the winner, earning her immunity. No contestants are eliminated from the competition.

== Production ==
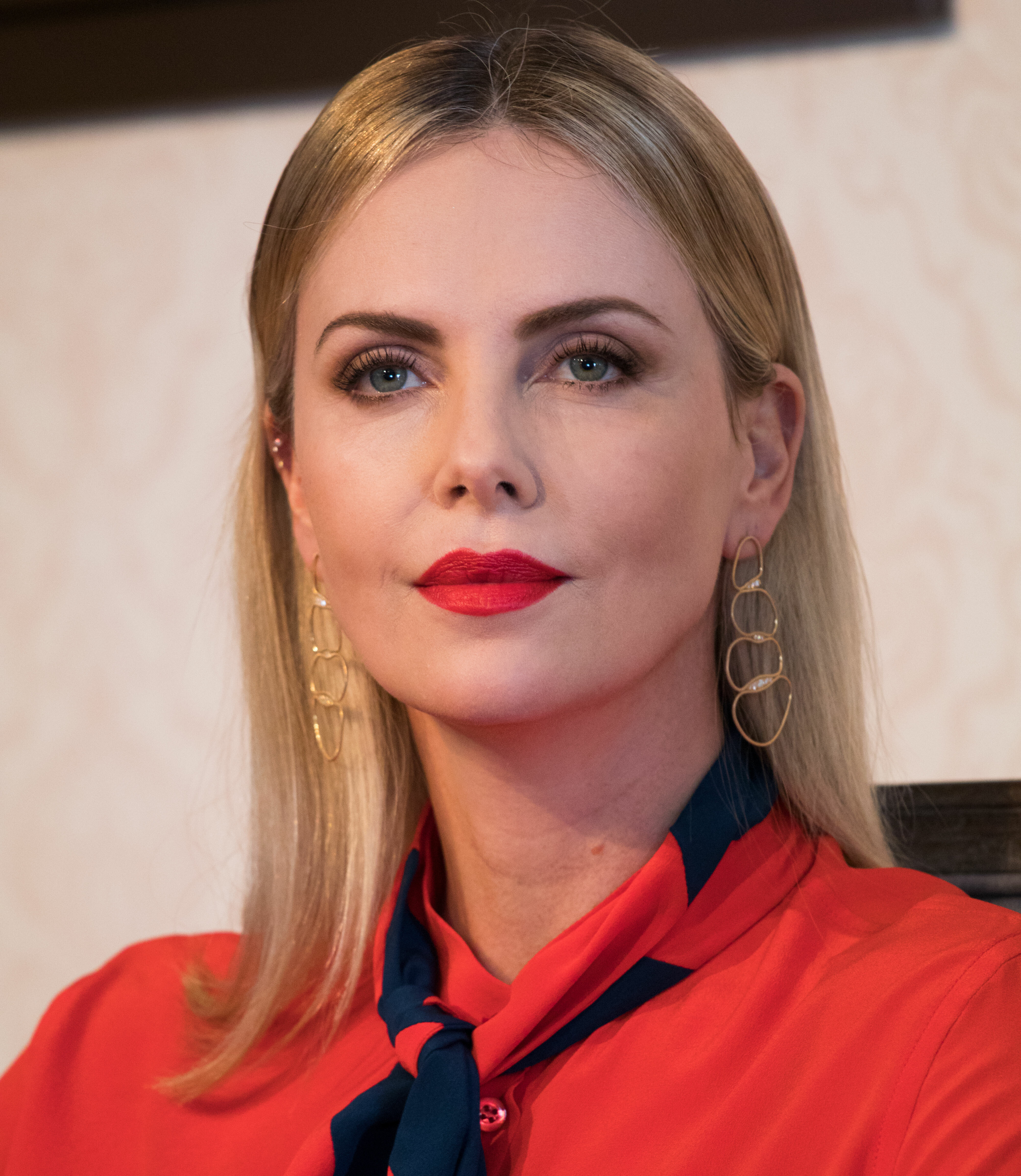
Charlize Theron is a guest judge.

The episode originally aired on January 5, 2024, as half of a two-part premiere. Theron said being a judge on the show was "a dream come true".

Sapphira Cristál's talent show song "O mio babbino caro", a soprano aria from the opera Gianni Schicchi (1918) by Italian composer Giacomo Puccini, was released as a single and received a music video.

=== Fashion ===
In the Werk Room, RuPaul wears a train conductor-inspired outfit. For the talent show, Sapphira Cristál wears a "theatrical" ball gown and a "Marie Antoinette-style" wig, according to The Philadelphia Inquirer.

For the fashion show, Morphine Love Dion wears a white towel dress that she removes to reveal a blue swimsuit. She wears sunglasses. Dawn has a yeti-inspired white outfit. She has long white sleeves and purple hair. Amanda Tori Meating's look reveals into a purple outfit. She has three breasts and neon green hair. Xunami Muse has a red outfit and a long braid. Q's outfit is black and reveals colorful wings. Mirage has a blue-and-orange outfit with feathers. Sapphira Cristál wears a blue outfit that reveals into a leotard. She has pasties over her breastplate.

== Reception and recognition ==
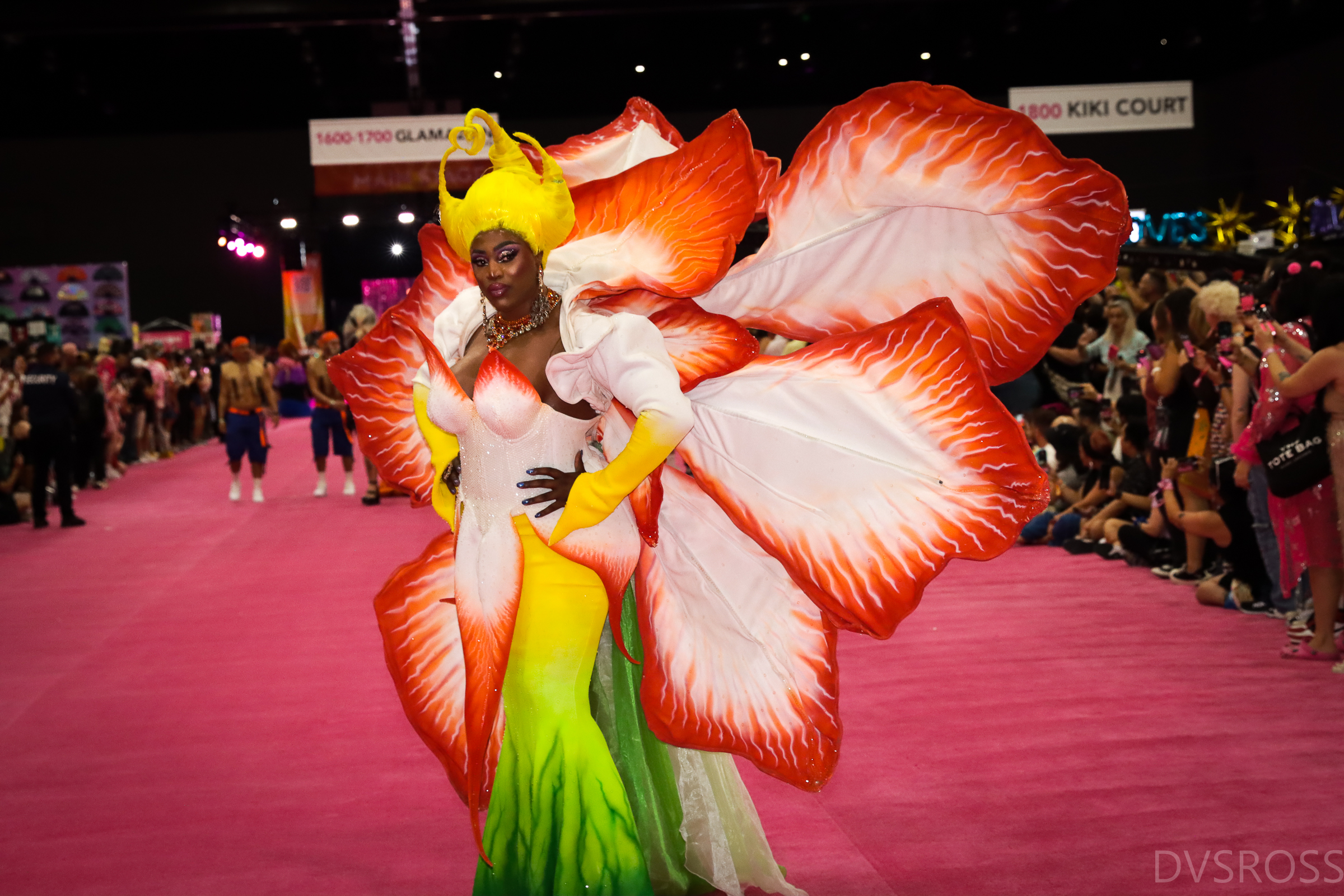
Sapphira Cristál (pictured at RuPaul's DragCon LA in 2024) wins the episode's mini-challenge and main challenge.

Reviews noted the Rate-A-Queen ranking format as a triangle-shaped parody of The Circle. Kevin O'Keeffe of Xtra Magazine opined, "I don't mind the more languid start to the season, but I do wonder why they didn't just keep the incredibly successful premiere format from Season 15." Out magazine's Bernardo Sim called the Rate-A-Queen twist "draggy and fun". Gay Times included Mirage in a 2024 list of the seventeen best talent show performances on Drag Race to date.

Ricky Cornish of Pride.com called Sapphira Cristál's talent show performance "unbelievable". Joey Guerra of the Houston Chronicle said her lip-sync performance "heralded the arrival of an icon" and opined, "Everything about it was ridiculous. And so, so good." Jeremy Rodriguez of Philadelphia Gay News said Sapphira Cristál's lip-sync exhibited her comedic side and wrote, "At some point during the number, Sapphira's breast plate fell off and she bounced her fake breasts up and down on the stage. Instantly iconic."

The corresponding episode of RuPaul's Drag Race: Untucked earned editors Matthew D. Miller and Kellen Cruden nominations in the Outstanding Picture Editing for an Unstructured Reality Program category at the 76th Primetime Creative Arts Emmy Awards.

== See also ==
- Charlize Theron filmography
