= Drag Race Vegas Live! Makeovers =

- RuPaul's Drag Race episode
- Episode no.: Season 16; Episode 13
- Presented by: RuPaul
- Original air date: March 29, 2024

Guest appearance
- Kelsea Ballerini

Episode chronology
← Previous "Bathroom Hunties"	Next → "Booked and Blessed"

"Drag Race Vegas Live! Makeovers" is the thirteenth episode of the sixteenth season of the American television series RuPaul's Drag Race. It originally aired on March 29, 2024. The episode's main challenge tasks the final five contestants with giving makeovers to Pit Crew dancers from the Las Vegas variety show RuPaul's Drag Race Live! Kelsea Ballerini is a guest judge. Plane Jane wins the main challenge. Morphine Love Dion is eliminated from the competition after placing in the bottom and losing a lip-sync contest against Sapphira Cristál to Ballerini's "Miss Me More".

== Episode ==
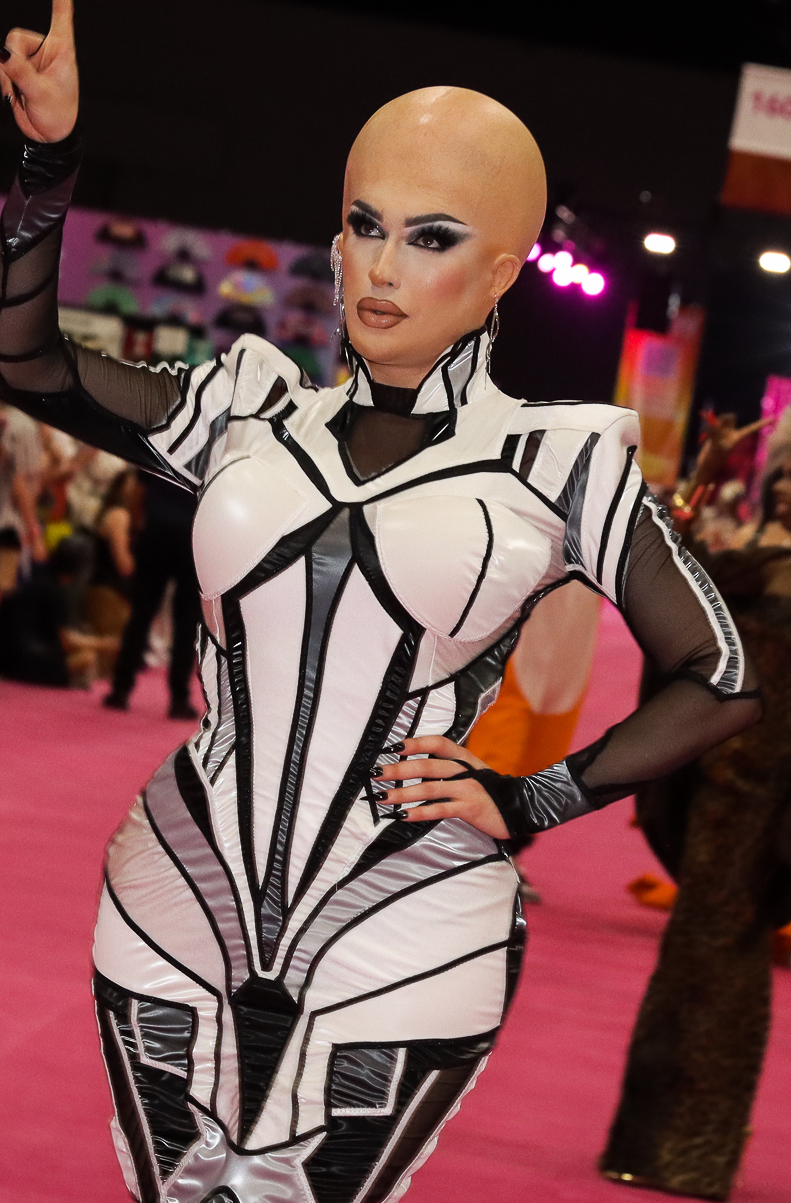
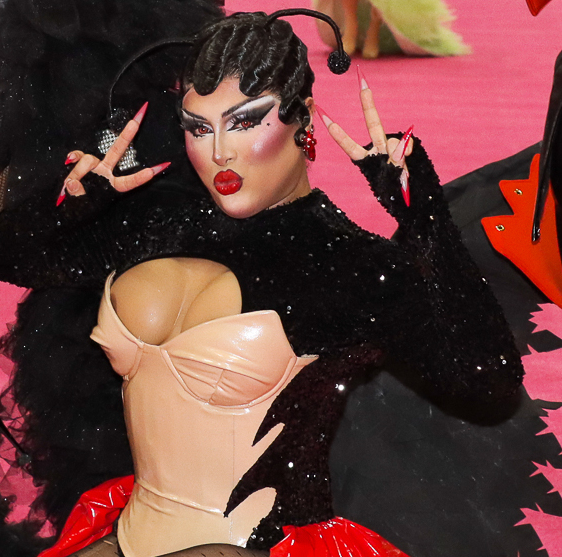
Plane Jane (left, pictured at RuPaul's DragCon LA in 2024) wins the episode's main challenge; Morphine Love Dion (right, pictured at the same event) is eliminated from the competition.

The final five contestants return to the Werk Room after Dawn's elimination on the previous episode. On a new day, the contestants find a Drag Race version of Monopoly on the table. RuPaul greets the group and reveals the main challenge, which tasks the contestants with giving makeovers to Pit Crew dancers from Las Vegas variety show RuPaul's Drag Race Live! The teams are determined randomly. RuPaul also tasks each pair with creating choreography for a dance breakout to be held on the main stage.

The pairs get acquainted and work on their looks and runway presentations. RuPaul returns to the Werk Room to meet with each pair, asking questions and offering advice. The pairs then practice on the main stage. On elimination day, the pairs make final preparations in the Werk Room. Nymphia Wind shares about her lack of self-confidence. One of the Pit Crew members discusses his dance background and coming out experience with Plane Jane, who relates.

On the main stage, RuPaul welcomes fellow judges Michelle Visage and Ts Madison as well as guest judge Kelsea Ballerini. RuPaul shares the runway category ("Drag Family Resemblance"), then the fashion show commences. The teams perform to RuPaul's song "Super Queen". The judges deliver their critiques, deliberate, then share the results with the group. Q, Nymphia Wind, and Plane Jane receive positive critiques, and Plane Jane is declared the winner. Morphine Love Dion and Sapphira Cristál place in the bottom and face off in a lip-sync contest to Ballerini's "Miss Me More" (2018). Sapphira Cristál wins the lip-sync and Morphine Love Dion is eliminated from the competition.

== Production and broadcast ==
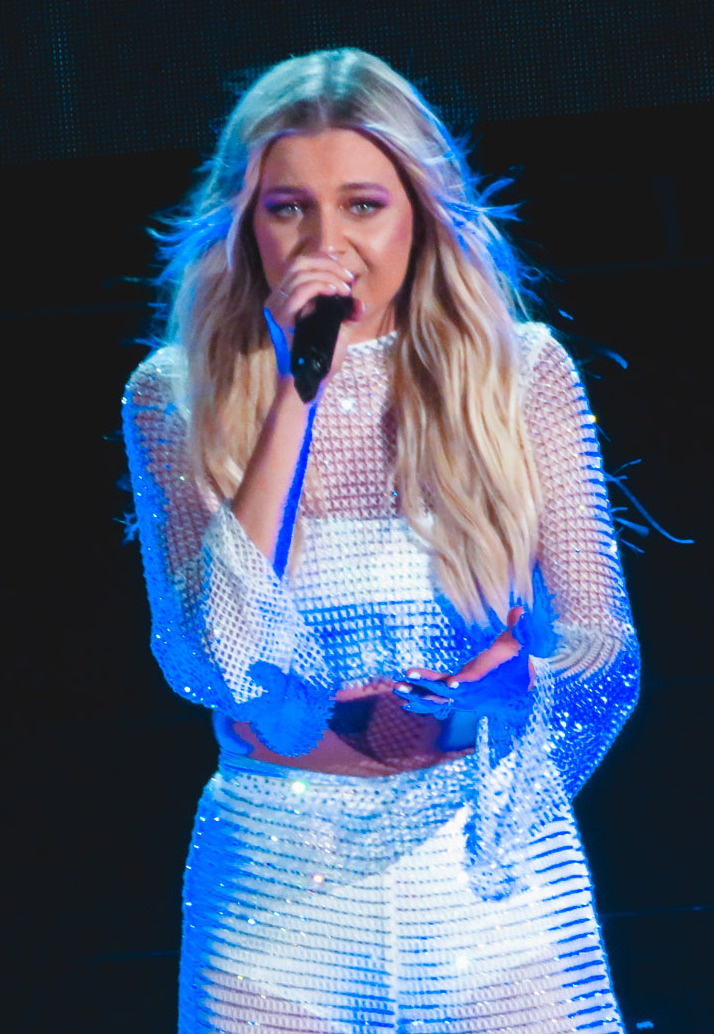
Kelsea Ballerini (pictured in 2012) is a guest judge.

The episode originally aired on March 29, 2024.

Nymphia Wind's partner used the drag name Juanita Wind. Plane Jane's partner Nick Lemmer used the drag persona Lazi Susan. Lazi Susan also made an appearance on the season finale. Lemmer later returned to drag with the persona Ashley in 2025.

=== Fashion ===
Q and Luna present monster-inspired outfits. Morphine Love Dion and La Tina Love Dion have sparkly dresses that tear away to bodysuits. Nymphia Wind and Juanita Wind wear feathered bodysuits; the former's is yellow and the latter's is light purple. Sapphira Cristál and Shakira Cristál wear orange outfits and large brown wigs. Plane Jane and Lazi Susan wear yellow outfits.

== Reception ==
Jason P. Frank of Vulture rated the episode five out of five stars. Queerty said, "The guys have no qualms about performing, and they're certainly at ease around queens, but it's a total blast watching them learn about tucking, walking in heels, and how to really lean into their drag personas."

Stephen Daw ranked the "Miss Me More" performance number 23 in Billboard's list of the season's lip-sync contests, writing: "Morphine managed to pull focus with a whirlwind of well-timed tricks that added a little extra kick to this country kiss-off. But Sapphira's sometimes-subtle, sometimes-boisterous, always-hilarious performance had just enough oomph to show the judges that it was not her time to depart." Daw opined, "It was the right call from the judges — we just can't help but think the 'Miss Me More' lip sync didn't quite live up to the standard set throughout season 16."
