= Grand Finale (RuPaul's Drag Race season 16) =

Television episode

- RuPaul's Drag Race episode
- Episode no.: Season 16; Episode 16
- Presented by: RuPaul
- Original air date: April 19, 2024

Guest appearances
- Cassandra Peterson; Sasha Colby; Malaysia Babydoll Foxx

Episode chronology
← Previous "Lip Sync LaLaPaRuza Smackdown – Reunited"	Next → —
- RuPaul's Drag Race (season 16)

"Grand Finale" is the sixteenth episode of the sixteenth season of the American television series RuPaul's Drag Race. It originally aired on April 19, 2024. The episode has the season's contestants return and the top three perform to original songs. The top two contestants also face off in a lip-sync contest. Nymphia Wind is crowned the season's winner, after defeating Sapphira Cristál in a lip-sync to "Padam Padam" by Kylie Minogue.

Sapphira Cristál and Xunami Muse are both named Miss Congeniality. The episode also has a tribute to guest Cassandra Peterson (also known as Elvira, Mistress of the Dark), who receives a lifetime achievement award. Sasha Colby and Malaysia Babydoll Foxx, the winner and Miss Congeniality of the fifteenth season, respectively, also make guest appearances.

== Episode ==
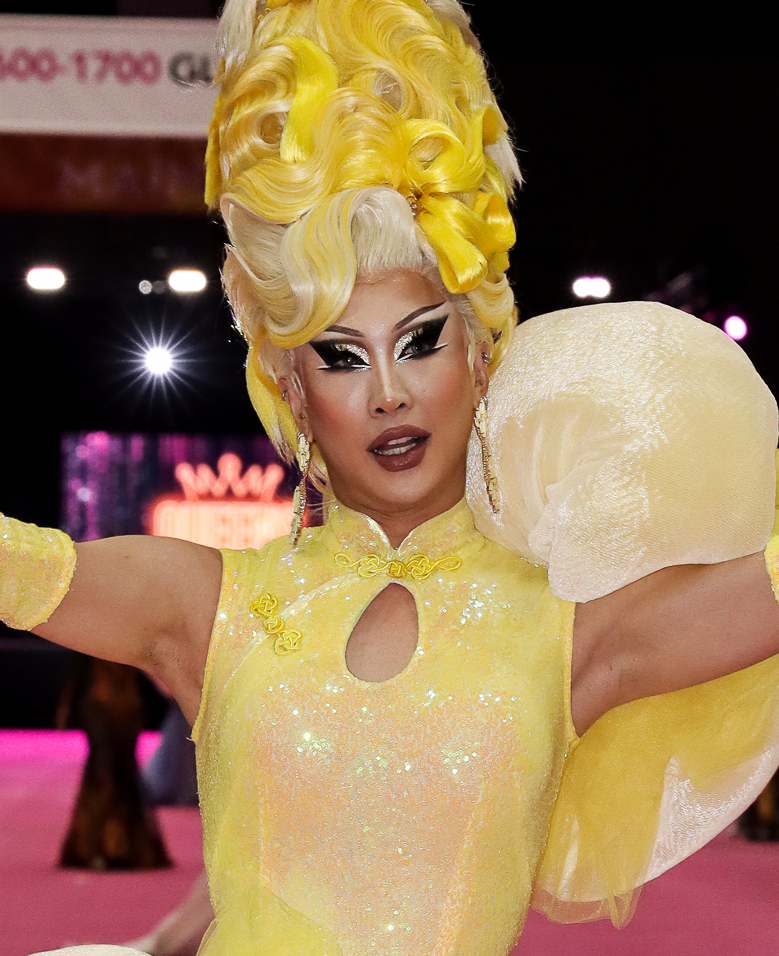
Nymphia Wind (pictured at RuPaul's DragCon LA in 2024) is crowned the season's winner.

The episode begins with RuPaul performing "Pink Limousine". On the main stage and in front of a live audience, RuPaul welcomes fellow judges Michelle Visage, Carson Kressley, Ts Madison, and Ross Mathews. RuPaul shares that the contestants have been tasked with performing to original songs and the top two will face off in a lip-sync contest to win the competition. All of the season's contestants enter the stage one at a time to RuPaul's song "Hustle That Cat", the runway category being "Grand Finale Eleganza". One at a time, the top three contestants perform, then receive final critiques from the judges and participate in interviews with RuPaul on the main stage. Nymphia Wind performs to "Queen of Wind", Plane Jane to "Bodysuit", and Sapphira Cristál to "DANCE!". After the performances, RuPaul pays tribute to Cassandra Peterson (also known as Elvira, Mistress of the Dark). RuPaul gives her the Giving Us Lifetime Achievement Award.

RuPaul invites the top three contestants back out to the stage and announces that Nymphia Wind and Sapphira Cristál are the finalists. RuPaul introduces a video montage of the contestants discussing their relationships with their families and friends. Then, season fifteen winner Sasha Colby returns to perform to "Her" (2022) by Megan Thee Stallion and participate in an interview with RuPaul. Following a promotion encouraging viewers to vote, the season's contestants return to present red, white, and blue outfits to the song "I Got the Power". Malaysia Babydoll Foxx, who was season fifteen's Miss Congeniality, joins to announced this season's winners: Sapphira Cristál and Xunami Muse. Nymphia Wind and Sapphira Cristál return to the stage and face off in a lip-sync contest to "Padam Padam" (2023) by Kylie Minogue. Nymphia Wind wins the lip-sync, making Sapphira Cristál the season's runner-up.

== Production and broadcast ==
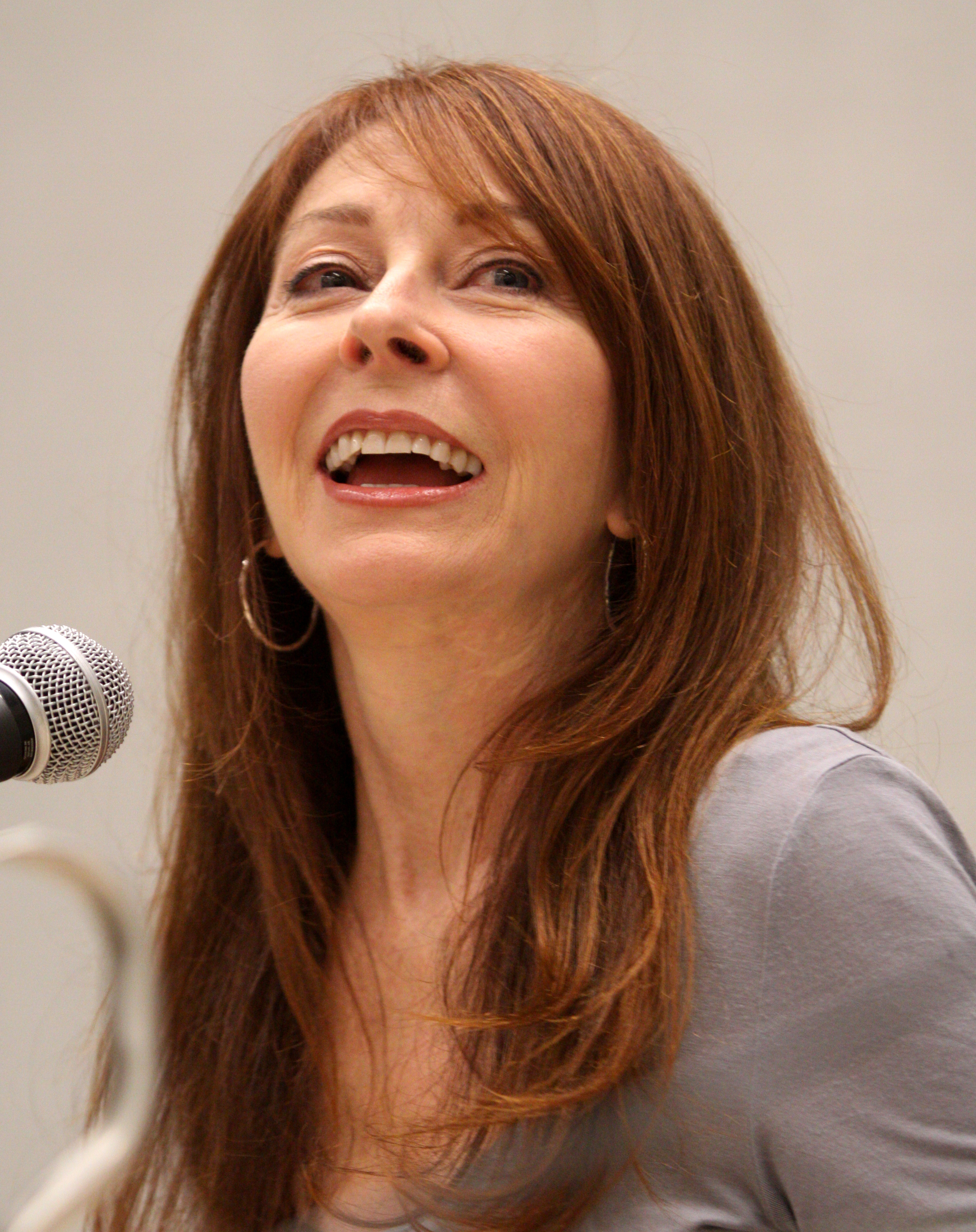
Cassandra Peterson (pictured in 2011) makes a guest appearance to receive a lifetime achievement award.

The episode originally aired on April 19, 2024. It was filmed on the same sound stage as "Lip Sync LaLaPaRuza Smackdown – Reunited".

The Los Angeles Times said Nymphia Wind's use of the word "country" (in reference to Taiwan) during her stage interview with RuPaul was "a source of delight" in Taiwan. Joey Guerra of the Houston Chronicle described Sapphira Cristál's song as "a Lizzo-esque anthem of empowerment" and said it "was the best customized to fit her personality". Multiple endings were filmed. The top three contestants were filmed watching the finale. The crowning ceremony took place at The Edge at Hudson Yards in New York City.

=== Fashion ===
For her main stage entrance, Nymphia Wind wears a yellow outfit resembling a banana. During "Padam Padam", she wears an outfit inspired by bubble tea, with balloons representing tapioca pearls.

During her performance of "DANCE!", Sapphira Cristál wears a bodysuit and an orange wig. She wears fangs (or "vampire teeth") during "Padam Padam", and later revealed she had planned to incorporate fake blood into her performance.

== Reception ==
Jason P. Frank of Vulture rated the episode four out of five stars. Kevin O'Keeffe of Xtra Magazine said Sapphira Cristál's performance of "DANCE!" was "so dynamite". Stephen Daw ranked the "Padam Padam" performance second in Billboard's list of the season's lip-sync contests. According to Out South Florida, the final lip-sync received comparisons to the lip-sync between Sasha Velour and Shea Couleé on the ninth season.

== See also ==
- Cassandra Peterson filmography
