= Queen Choice Awards =

- RuPaul's Drag Race episode
- Episode no.: Season 16; Episode 2
- Presented by: RuPaul
- Original air date: January 11, 2024

Episode chronology
← Previous "Rate-A-Queen"	Next → "The Mother of All Balls"

"Queen Choice Awards" is the second episode of the sixteenth season of the American television series RuPaul's Drag Race. It originally aired on January 11, 2024. The episode's main challenge tasks the contestants with performing in a talent show. Becky G is a guest judge. Love Connie and Ts Madison makes guest appearances for the mini-challenge and former contestant Derrick Barry also appears as the talent show's host. Geneva Karr and Plane Jane place in the top two and face off in a lip-sync contest to "Shower" by Becky G. Plane Jane is declared the winner.

== Episode ==
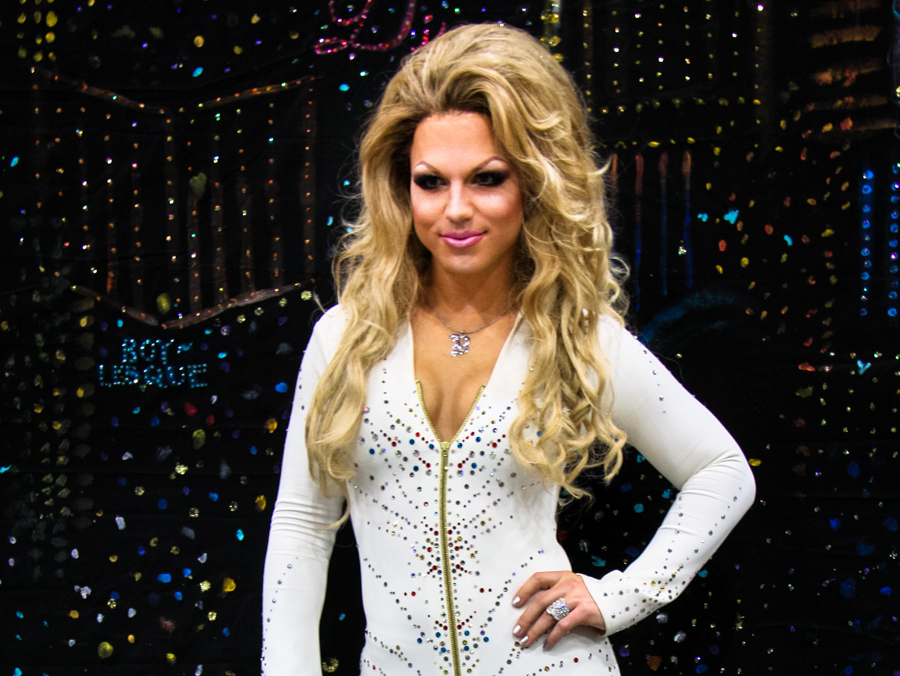
Former contestant Derrick Barry hosts the main challenge, which is a talent show.

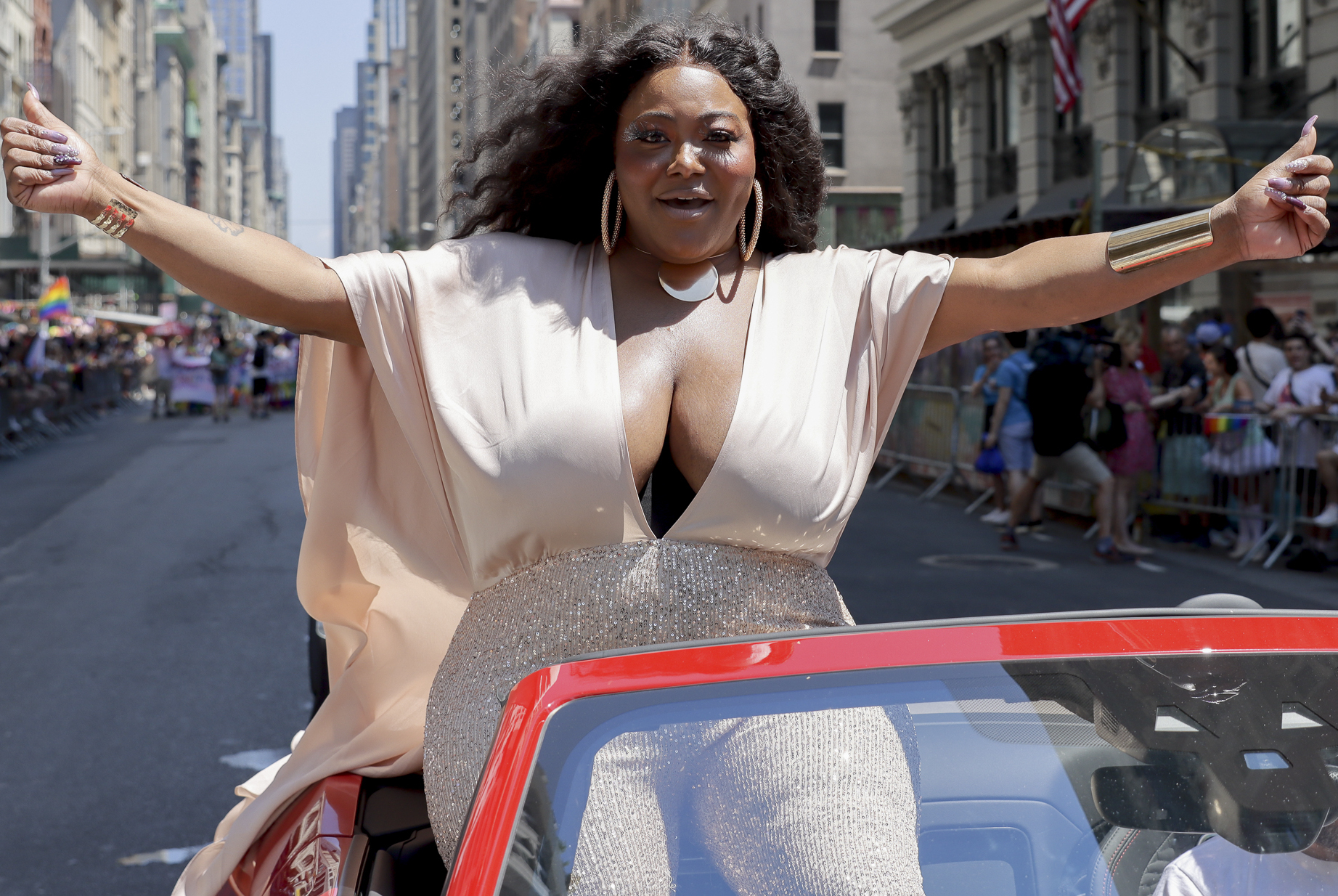
Ts Madison (pictured at the NYC Pride March in 2022) makes a guest appearance for the mini-challenge.

The next seven contestants of the season enter the Werk Room one at a time. RuPaul greets the group and reveals the mini-challenge, which tasks the contestants with participating in a DMV-themed photo shoot called "SheMV", featuring RuPaul as well as guests Love Connie and Ts Madison.

The contestants return to the Werk Room to get out of drag. RuPaul returns and reveals that Nymphia Wind is the winner of the mini-challenge. RuPaul then reveals the main challenge, which tasks the contestants with performing in the "Queen Choice Awards" talent show. RuPaul also shares that the contestants will be rating each other via "Rate-A-Queen" and that the winner of the main challenge will earn immunity on a future elimination. The contestants discuss the "Rate-A-Queen" twist and start to prepare.

On elimination day, the contestants make final preparations in the Werk Room for the talent and fashion shows. Nymphia Wind describes the drag scene in Taiwan. Hershii LiqCour-Jeté talks about being a parent. Becky G surprises the contestants and offers some advice to the group. On the main stage, RuPaul welcomes fellow judges Michelle Visage and Ross Mathews, as well as guest judge Becky G. The talent show, hosted by former contestant Derrick Barry, commences. Following are the contestants and acts:

- Geneva Karr – original song lip-sync
- Hershii LiqCour-Jeté – original song lip-sync
- Plasma – singing / impressions
- Nymphia Wind – cultural dance
- Megami – lip sync
- Mhi'ya Iman Le'Paige – lip-sync
- Plane Jane – original song ("Burger Finger") lip-sync

RuPaul reveals the runway category ("Made You Look"), then the fashion show commences. The judges deliver their critiques, then the contestants rank each other using "Rate-A-Queen". Geneva Karr and Plane Jane receive the highest placements, making them the top two contestants of the week. The two face off in a lip-sync contest to "Shower" (2014) by Becky G. Plane Jane is declared the winner.

== Production and broadcast ==
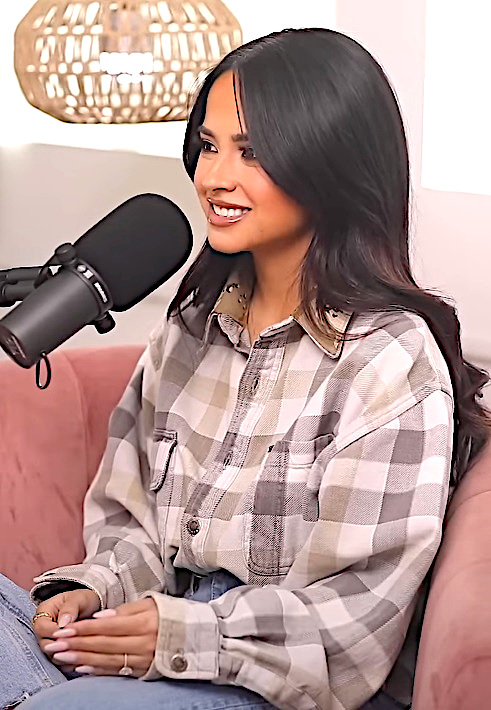
Becky G (pictured in 2023) is a guest judge.

The episode originally aired on January 11, 2024.

During her performance to "Burger Finger", Plane Jane squirts ketchup and mustard on her breastplate.

=== Fashion ===
For her entrance look, Hershii LiqCour-Jeté wears a black-and-white outfit with a long purple wig. Plasma wears a yellow skirt, a green jacket, and a red wig. She has a black hat and matching gloves, and she carries a handbag. Geneva Karr wears a dress inspired by the flag of Mexico. Plane Jane's outfit has an animal print with a matching collar and boots. She has hoop earrings and a dark wig. Megami wears an antichrist-inspired red dress with colorful embellishments. She has red sunglasses, two small horns on her forehead, and a headpiece. Mhi'ya Iman Le'Paige wears an orange dress with a matching wig. Nymphia Wind has a yellow outfit and a tall wig with multiple pairs of sunglasses. She opens her jacket to reveal many bananas.

In the Werk Room, RuPaul wears a black-and-white suit with red shoes. For the main stage, RuPaul was a black-and-blue dress and a blonde wig. For the talent show, Geneva Karr wears a red dress, black boots, and a dark wig. She removes the red dress to reveal a black outfit underneath. Hershii LiqCour-Jeté has a park ranger-inspired outfit and a dark wig. Plasma wears a black-and-white outfit with a bow tie and a red wig. Nymphia Wind has a colorful outfit with long sleeves and a headpiece. Megami wears a short black dress with a veil. She carries a pride flag and holds up signs with messages, including "protect queer art". Mhi'ya Iman Le'Paige has a yellow dress, tall white boots, and an afro as well as braids. Plane Jane wears a large hamburger, tall boots, and a short red wig. She removes the burger to show a red outfit and oversized breastplate underneath.

For the fashion show, Nymphia Wind wears a green banana, which she removes to show banana-inspired outfits underneath. She has yellow gloves and a yellow wig. Hershii LiqCour-Jeté has a brown dress. Plasma wears a pin cushion-inspired red outfit, which she removes to reveal burlesque-inspired outfits underneath. Mhi'ya Iman Le'Paige has a yellow swimsuit and a yellow wig. Geneva Karr has a black-and-white outfit which transforms into a purple dress. Megami wears a goddess-inspired blue-and-gold outfit with white wings. Plane Jane has a blonde wig and a white dress, which she removes to reveal denim shorts and a red jersey-inspired shirt underneath. She also has a red foam hand.

== Reception ==
Jason P. Frank of Vulture rated the episode five out of five stars. Rachel Shatto of Pride.com said Megami's performance was "instantly iconic (and subsequently memed)". Bernardo Sim of Out magazine said her performance was "memeified by people with both good and bad intentions". Megami's act was parodied by Meatball.
