= Wendy Jo Smith =

American rapper

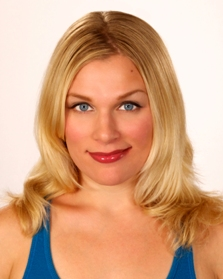
- Photograph by Stas Tagios
- Born: Toledo, Ohio, U.S.
- Other names: Wendy Ho (stage persona)
- Education: Missouri State University
- Occupations: Comedian, singer, and rapper
- Years active: 2002-present
- Notable work: Poop Noodle on YouTube
- Website: wendyexperience.com

Wendy Jo Smith, better known by her stage-name Wendy Ho, is an American rap-artist, singer, and comedian.

== Early life and career ==
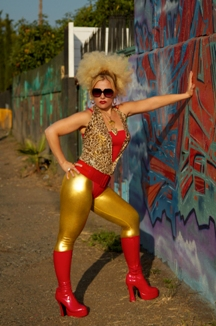
Wendy Jo Smith's "Wendy Ho" stage persona, photo by Stas Tagios

Smith was born in Toledo, Ohio, and spent much of her childhood in Kansas City, Kansas. She moved to New York City in the summer of 2002, where she participated in the cabaret scene and performed in regional theatre shows. She was the recipient of the Kathleen Turner Performance Scholarship at the college at Southwest Missouri State University, where she also acquired the nickname "Wendy Ho".

Smith began her career in the comedy clubs of New York, eventually playing a Christmas show at a gay-oriented venue, and from that point forward she began focusing much of her act on gay audiences. She used her college nickname "Wendy Ho" in her act, which has been described as a parody of a prostitute from Harlem as well as a "female drag queen". Her act contains both stand-up comedy, rap performances, and singing. She has stated that she uses the word "Ho" in her stage name in order to reclaim the word from its negative connotations.

== Entertainment career ==
Smith's first release was the rap album The Gospel According to Ho, accompanied by a music video for the track Bitch, I Stole Yo' Purse. The video was broadcast on the cable music video channel Logo TV, and Logo viewers voted the video the "ultimate funniest video" in February 2008. The television series Nip/Tuck hired Jennifer Coolidge to play a parody of the Wendy Ho persona called "Hot Coco", who sings a song titled Yo Stank from an album titled The Gospel According to Coco (the name of which parodies the title of Smith's first album). After the performance Coolidge stated "Wendy Ho is about as cool as it gets. I'd never seen anything like her."

The song Fuck Me became a favorite among drag queens in the United States, who frequently use the song for drag performances. Smith later released a remixed version of the song on her album Number 2 in the summer of 2010 and released her second full album Yes, I'm a Ho! in October 2010. Television appearances for Smith have included her appearance on the Showtime series I Can't Believe I'm Still Single. In 2014, her album Greatest Shits entered the Billboard Comedy Album top 10 chart, hitting number eight for the November 1, 2014 list.
