= Hershii LiqCour-Jeté =

American drag performer

- Born: St. Louis, Missouri, U.S.
- Occupation: Drag queen
- Television: RuPaul's Drag Race (season 16)
- Children: 2

Hershii LiqCour-Jeté (born 1990, 1991 or 1992) is an American drag performer most known for competing on the sixteenth season of reality television series RuPaul's Drag Race and the eleventh season of its All Stars spin-off.

== Early life ==
Hershii LiqCour-Jeté was born in St. Louis, Missouri, and raised in a Christian family.

== Career ==
Hershii LiqCour-Jeté's drag career started in Atlanta, in the U.S. state of Georgia. She competed on the sixteenth season (2024) of the television series RuPaul's Drag Race, and therefore also appeared in the companion series RuPaul's Drag Race: Untucked. She sold her car to afford outfits for Drag Race.

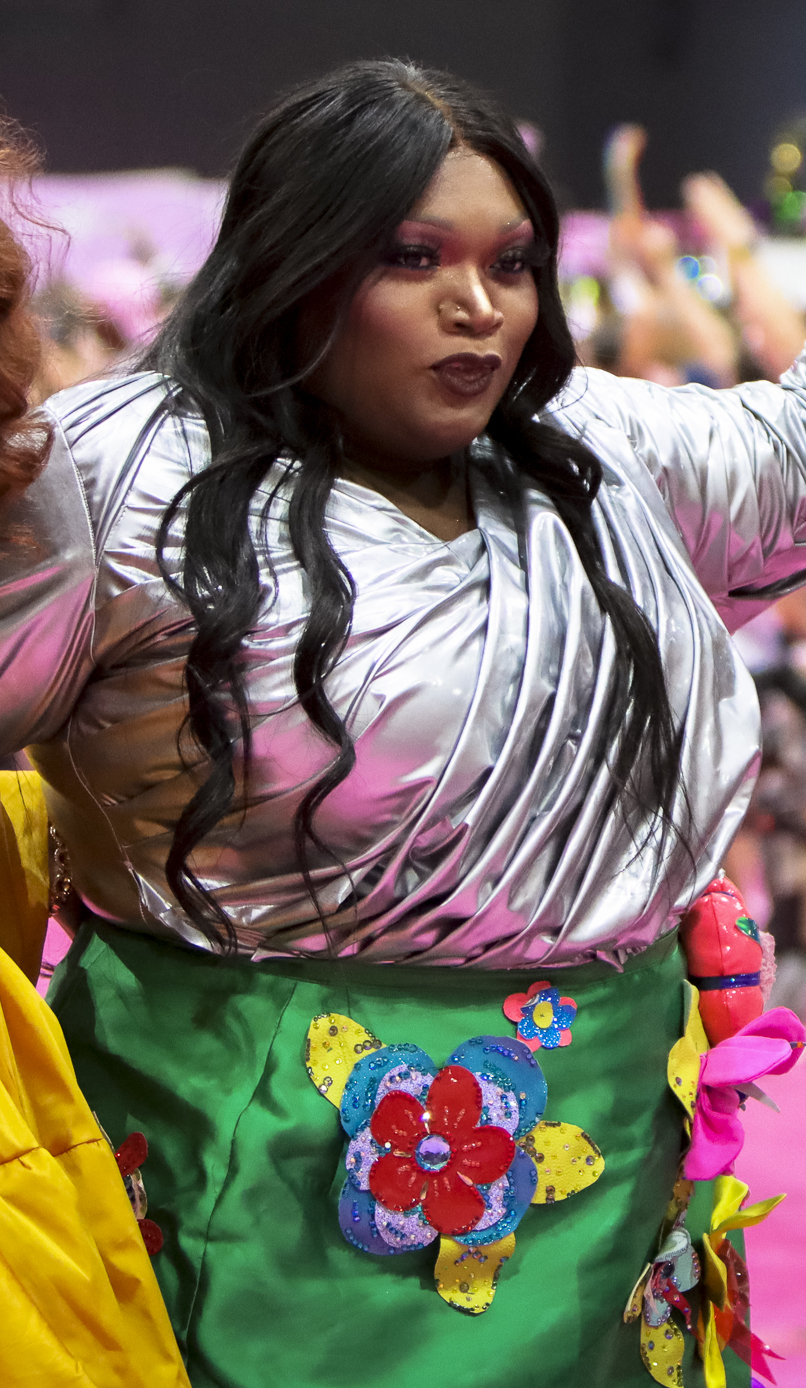
Hershii LiqCour-Jeté's "drag sister" is Kornbread Jeté (pictured at RuPaul's DragCon LA in 2022), who competed on the fourteenth season of RuPaul's Drag Race. Hershii LiqCour-Jeté performed a song written by Kornbread Jeté during a talent show on the sixteenth season.

On the second episode ("Queen Choice Awards"), she performed "a fun, memorable number to her original track selling Whiplash wig glue", according to Gay Times. The track "Whiplash!" was written by Kornbread Jeté, who competed on the fourteenth season of Drag Race and is Hershii LiqCour-Jeté's "drag sister". Trae DeLellis of Miami New Times and Michael Cook of Out South Florida called Hershii LiqCour-Jeté's talent show performance "rather entertaining" and "stunning", respectively. Xtra Magazine said, "Hershii's 'Whiplash' number serves some unexpected production design (don't think too hard about why we're in the jungle), and the song itself is catchy."

Hershii LiqCour-Jeté was the first contestant to be eliminated, after placing in the bottom of the ball challenge and losing a lip-sync contest against Geneva Karr on the third episode ("The Mother of All Balls"). Hershii LiqCour-Jeté placed fourteenth overall. She has said she did not like the Rate-a-Queen twist. Stephen Daw of Billboard ranked her lip-sync against Geneva Karr to "Maybe You're the Problem" (2022) by Ava Max number 19 and her lip-sync against Mirage to "Alone" (2023) by Kim Petras featuring Nicki Minaj number 15 in a list of all lip-syncs from the sixteenth season.

In April 2026, Hershii was announced to be competing in the eleventh season of RuPaul's Drag Race All Stars in the third bracket. Her season 16 castmates Dawn and Morphine Love Dion are also competing on the season.

== Personal life ==
Hershii LiqCour-Jeté moved from Atlanta to Los Angeles in 2017. She is part of the LGBTQ community. She and her partner parent two children.

Hershii LiqCour-Jeté has described her drag as "beautiful and stupid" as well as "glam camp aunty drag", according to Autostraddle. She and Kornbread Jeté are part of the Haus of Jeté.

== Discography ==
- "Whiplash!" (featuring Kornbread Jeté)

== Filmography ==
- RuPaul's Drag Race (season 16)
- RuPaul's Drag Race: Untucked
- Bring Back My Girls (2024), hosted by Ts Madison
- Whatcha Packin', hosted by Michelle Visage
- Queer Church
- Give It to Me Straight, hosted by Maddy Morphosis
- RuPaul's Drag Race All Stars (season 11)
