= Morphine Love Dion =

American drag performer

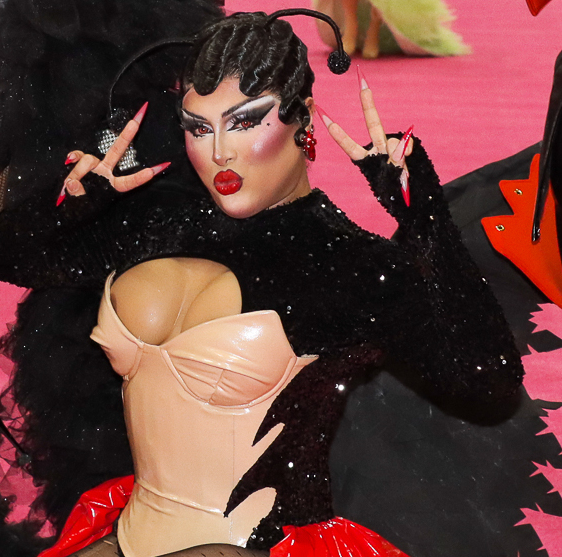
- Morphine Love Dion at RuPaul's DragCon LA, 2024
- Born: January 4, 1997 (age 29); Hialeah, Florida, U.S.
- Other names: Michelle Orozco
- Occupation: Drag queen
- Television: RuPaul's Drag Race (season 16)
- Website: morphinelovedion.com

Michelle Orozco (born January 4, 1997), better known by the stage name Morphine Love Dion, is an American drag performer best known for competing on the sixteenth season of RuPaul's Drag Race and the eleventh season of RuPaul's Drag Race All Stars.

== Early life and education ==
Orozco was born on 4 January 1997 in Hialeah, Florida's Miami metropolitan area, to a Latino-Christian family. Both their parents are Nicaraguan.

== Career ==
While getting ready backstage for a performance in Miami, Morphine was introduced to Athena Dion of the House of Dion, who helped fix her wig and later became her drag mother.

Morphine used to be part of the House of Lords, one of Miami's largest drag families that emerged during the mid-1990s when the ball culture was starting to gain popularity in South Florida. The ballroom events featured various "categories" that called for themed costumes, and high-fashion performances. According to Morphine, she often walked "face categories" at these events. After leaving the House of Lords, she was "007" for a while, operating as an independent performer in the ballroom scene. As of 2024, she is an honorary member of the House of Gucci, in addition to being the mother of her own drag family called Haus of Love.

Morphine competed on RuPaul’s Drag Race season 16 and was eliminated on the thirteenth episode ("Drag Race Vegas Live! Makeovers"), placing fifth overall. She auditioned six times before being cast on the show. Her entrance look on the first episode was a "dragged-up" version of Kali Uchis' outfit at the 2021 Variety Hitmakers Awards. On the fifteenth episode ("Lip Sync LaLaPaRuza Smackdown – Reunited"), she won a series of lip-syncs against other eliminated contestants, earning $50,000. She is the first regular season contestant and second overall from the Drag Race franchise to be crowned the "Queen of She Done Already Done Had Herses", after Raja Gemini on the seventh season of RuPaul's Drag Race All Stars.

Morphine is the drag mother of Juicy Love Dion who competed on RuPaul’s Drag Race season 18. They first met in highschool when Morphine was a senior and Juicy was a freshman. Morphine is also the drag mother of Angel Rodriguez ("Lil Plastic Love Dion").

In April 2026, Morphine was announced to be competing on the eleventh season of RuPaul's Drag Race All Stars in the first bracket. Her season 16 castmates Dawn and Hershii LiqCour-Jeté are also competing on the season.

== Personal life ==
Outside of drag, Orozco identifies as nonbinary and leans "more to the femme side."

On 23 July 2024, an Uber vehicle containing Dion and fellow Drag Race contestant Kaos crashed into the center divider wall on the Interstate 10 freeway in Jefferson Park, Los Angeles. A second vehicle then collided with the car, killing one and injured an additional 10, including Dion and Kaos. Dion's Instagram account later made a statement on their behalf stating that they "suffered multiple injuries but [were] grateful to be alive," requesting that fans "[p]lease keep her in your thoughts and prayers. Some space and time is appreciated as she focuses on healing." Later, she posted an update to her Instagram clarifying her injuries, which included a fractured collarbone, a broken jaw which required surgery to repair, and several lost teeth, stating that she was "still a bit sad and traumatized but extremely grateful and happy to be alive."

== Filmography ==
- RuPaul's Drag Race (season 16)
- RuPaul's Drag Race: Untucked
- Hey Qween! (2024)
- Touch-Ups with Raven (2024)
- Bring Back My Girls
- RuPaul's Drag Race All Stars (season 11), 2026
