= Sapphira Cristál =

American drag performer and opera singer

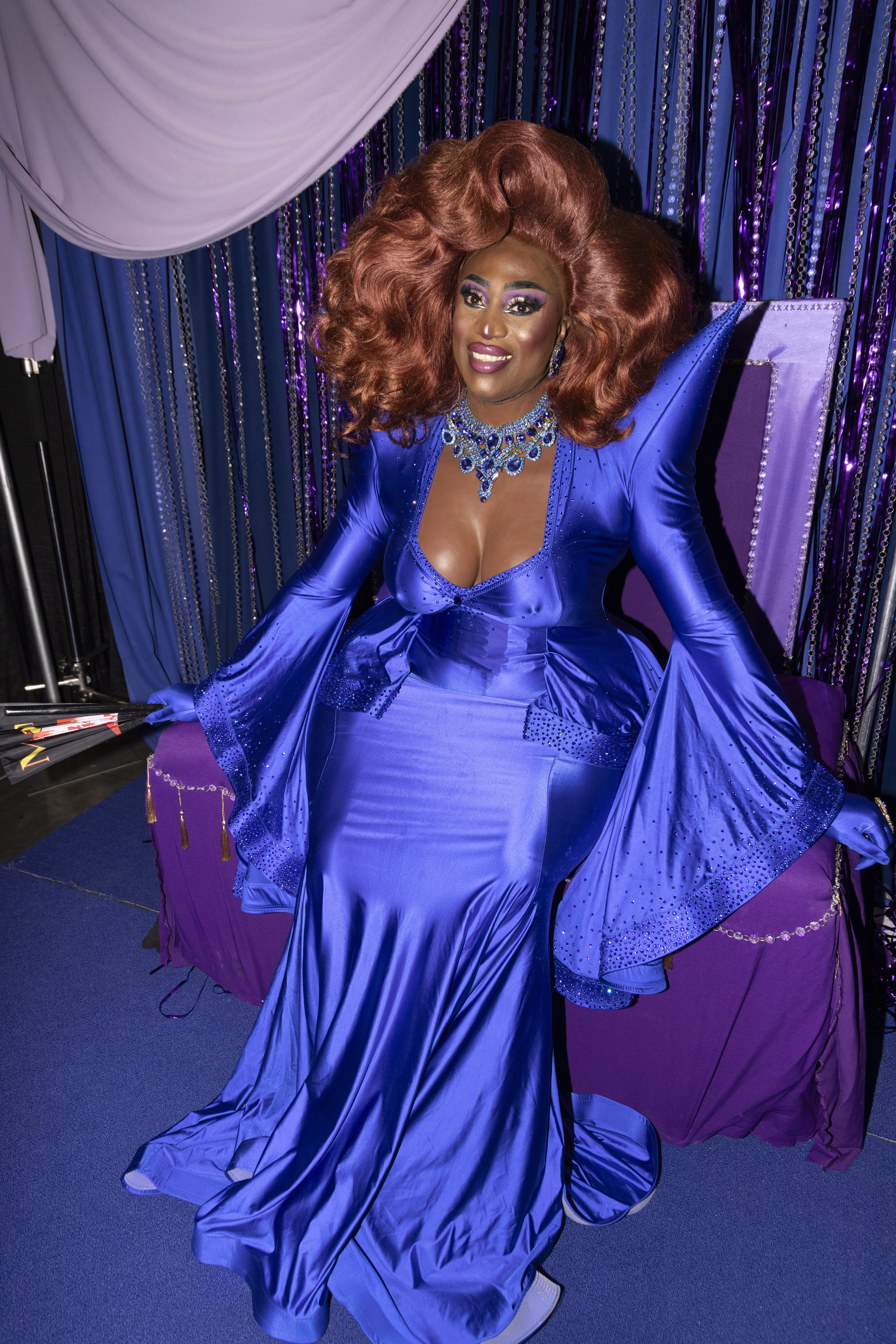
- Sapphira Cristál at RuPaul's DragCon LA, 2024
- Born: O'Neill Nichol Haynes; September 27, 1988 (age 38); Bryan, Texas, U.S.
- Education: University of Rochester; Bard College
- Occupation: Drag queen
- Television: RuPaul's Drag Race (season 16)
- Title: Miss Congeniality (along with Xunami Muse)
- Predecessor: Malaysia Babydoll Foxx
- Successor: Crystal Envy
- Relatives: Saul Soliz (stepfather)
- Website: sapphiracristal.com

Sapphira Cristál (born September 27, 1988) is the stage name of O'Neill Nichol Haynes, an American drag performer who was both runner-up and Miss Congeniality on season 16 of RuPaul's Drag Race. She is also a classically trained opera singer and a composer.

== Early life and education ==
Born in Bryan, Texas, Haynes's stepfather was MMA trainer Saul Soliz. Haynes was raised in Houston. His first exposure to opera was at the age of 4, when he attended a Houston Ebony Opera Guild performance of La bohème at the Miller Outdoor Theatre in Houston. He practiced Brazilian Jiu-Jitsu and Muay Thai as a child. Haynes attended Houston's Kinder High School for the Performing and Visual Arts. He studied music composition and opera at the Eastman School of Music at the University of Rochester and the Longy School of Music at Bard College, but did not complete his bachelor's degree. His first experience singing opera was when he attended a voice lesson dressed as Leontyne Price while attending the Eastman School and his teacher, Karen Holvik, allowed him to sing as a sopranist for the first time. After transferring to the Longy School of Music, Haynes' father discovered his sexuality and cut off his financial resources, eventually leaving Haynes homeless. He was subsequently expelled from the school after cursing out a pair of administrators who refused to help him with his housing situation. Haynes and their father would later reconcile their relationship.

== Career ==
Sapphira Cristál started doing drag in Rochester, New York and worked in New York City, Boston, Massachusetts and Provincetown, Massachusetts.

Sapphira Cristál competed on season 16 of RuPaul's Drag Race in 2023, after auditioning for the show 11 times. She won the first episode's talent show challenge by performing the opera piece "O mio babbino caro". Following the premiere, Sapphira Cristál released a studio version of her performance. In total, she won four challenges throughout the season to earn a spot in the finale. She was voted by her fellow contestants as Miss Congeniality, alongside Xunami Muse, and placed as the runner-up to Nymphia Wind.

Outside of Drag Race, she has won fourteen drag pageants.

=== Podcast ===
In March 2026, Cristál began hosting the eponymous interview podcast Sapphira, produced by Do the Most and BeeZee Productions. Episodes are released weekly on Tuesdays on podcast platforms and Cristál's YouTube channel. The first episode, featuring Cristál's RuPaul's Drag Race castmate Dawn, was released on March 10, 2026.

No.	Title	Original release date
1	"The Me Not Extremely Stupid Academy with Dawn"	March 10, 2026
2	"RIP Craigslist with Monét X Change"	March 17, 2026
3	"This Has Taken Such a Turn with AJ Hikes"	March 24, 2026
4	"How's It Feel Being So Legendary with Peppermint"	March 31, 2026
5	"Bring Back My Brothels with Plasma"	April 7, 2026
6	"Do I Know How to Write Jokes with Dulcé Sloan"	April 14, 2026
7	"Well, Yes with Amanda Tori Meating"	April 21, 2026
8	"You've Been Chosen with Kevin Aviance"	April 28, 2026
9	"The Giggle Bodega with Harrison Greenbaum"	May 5, 2026
10	"Have You Watched the Podcast Tamar with Alexis Michelle"	May 12, 2026
11	"A Billionaire Is Always a Bottom with Margaret Cho"	May 19, 2026
12	"Let's Wake It Up with Ocean Kelly"	May 26, 2026
13	"I'd Watch You Sit on a Cake with Aquaria"	June 2, 2026
14	"Dongs All Over the World with Honey Davenport"	June 9, 2026

== Personal life ==
Haynes is pansexual, polyamorous and non-binary, and is based in Philadelphia, Pennsylvania. Growing up, Haynes went to the same church as Beyoncé and Kelly Rowland in Houston, Texas.

== Discography ==
All credits adapted from Apple Music and Spotify.

=== Albums ===
- The Cristál Ball (2025)

=== Singles ===
==== As lead artist ====
Year	Title	Album	Writer(s)	Producer(s)
2024	"Get Your Flowers"	Non-album single	James Blaszko, O'Neill Haynes, Tazman Mekell Gillespie	Ocean Kelly
2024	"Enough"	Non-album single	Ash Gordon, James Blaszko, O'Neill Haynes, Ocean Kelly	Ocean Kelly
2024	"O mio babbino caro" (Sapphira Cristál with Giacomo Puccini, Giovacchino Forzano, Macedonia Radio Orchestra, Oleg Kondratenko)	Non-album single	Giacomo Puccini, Giovacchino Forzano	Jonathan Estabrooks

==== As featured artist ====
Year	Title	Album	Writer(s)	Producer(s)
2024	"DANCE!" (The Cast of RuPaul's Drag Race featuring Sapphira Cristál)	Non-album single	Brett McLaughlin, O'Neill Haynes	Leland, Gabe Lopez

== Filmography ==
Year	Title	Genre	Role	Notes
2023	RuPaul's Drag Race	Web series	Herself	1 special episode; Meet the Queens
2024	RuPaul's Drag Race (season 16)	Television	Contestant	Runner-up, Miss Congeniality; 16 episodes
2024	RuPaul's Drag Race: Untucked	Television	Herself	Season 15, 13 episodes
2024	Whatcha Packin'	Web series	Herself	Guest; 1 episode
2024	Hey Qween!	Web series	Herself	Guest; 1 episode

- Touch-Ups with Raven (2024)
- Bring Back My Girls

== See also ==
- List of people from Houston
- List of people from Philadelphia
