= Mirage (drag queen) =

American entertainer

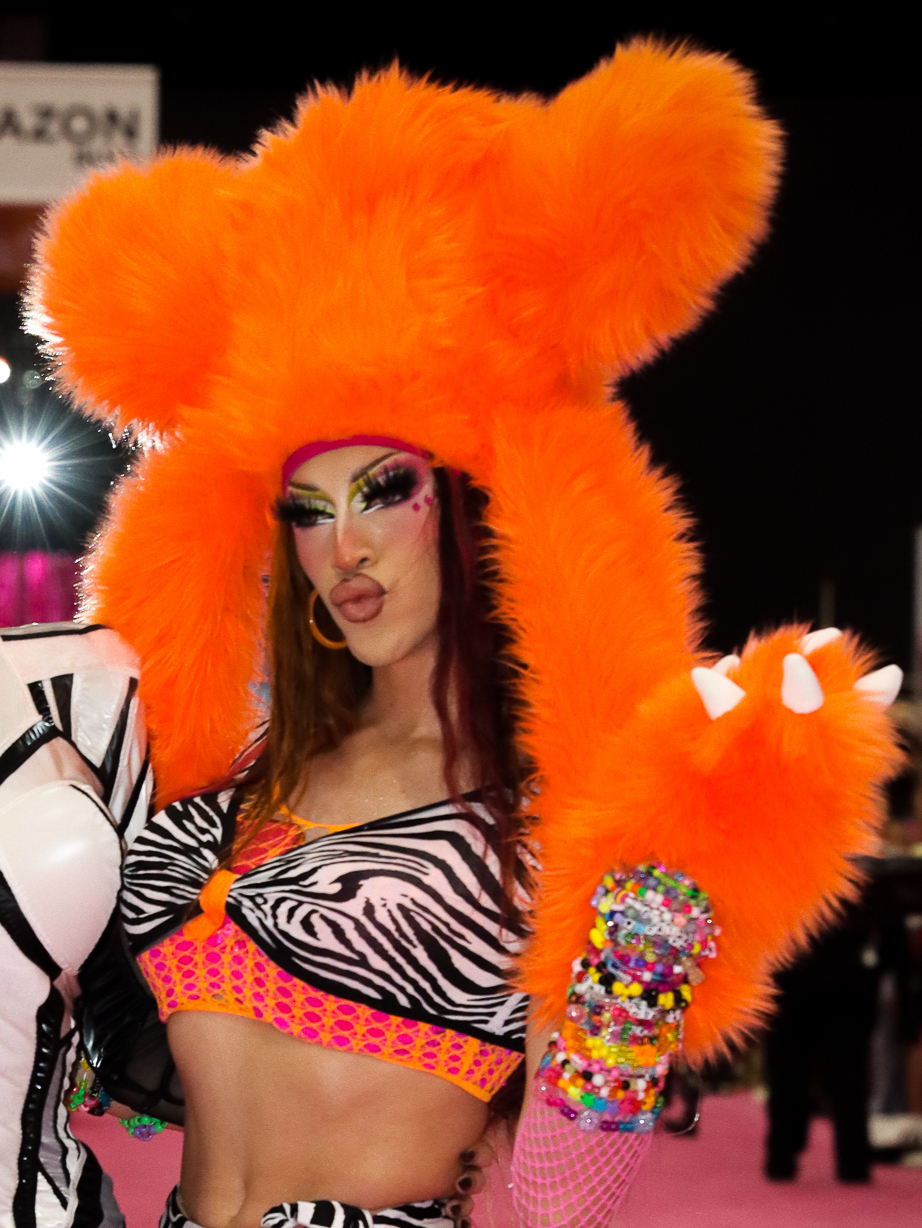
- Mirage at RuPaul's DragCon LA, 2024
- Born: Dean Sproule; 1993 or 1994 (age 31–32)
- Other name: Mirage Amuro
- Occupation: Drag queen
- Television: RuPaul's Drag Race (season 16)

Mirage Amuro (born 1993/1994), better known simply as Mirage, is the stage name of Dean Sproule, an American drag performer who competed on season 16 of RuPaul's Drag Race.

== Career ==
Mirage competed on season 16 of RuPaul's Drag Race. She performed a "heel clack heavy" lip-sync to an original song called "She's Such a Bitch" for the talent show episode. The song referenced season 15 contestant Anetra. On the show, Mirage discussed her Apache heritage and performing at Indigenous Pride. She was eliminated in the fourth episode ("RDR Live!"), after placing in the bottom two of a challenge requiring contestants to perform in a Saturday Night Live-style sketch comedy show, and losing a lip-sync against Geneva Karr to "Dark Lady" (1974) by Cher. Mirage was the host of the comedy show, and during Untucked she admitted to not knowing the words to "Dark Lady". She was the second contestant to be eliminated on season 16, placing thirteenth overall.

Sam Damshenas included Mirage in Gay Times' 2024 list of the best fifteen talent show performances on Drag Race. "She's Such a Bitch" was named Number 18 on Rolling Stone's "Top 20 Best Songs by Drag Queens" calling it an "instant classic."

== Personal life ==
Mirage is based in Las Vegas, and of Mexican and Native American heritage. She moved a lot during her childhood and went to high school in New Mexico.

== Discography ==
- "She's Such a Bitch" (2024)

== Filmography ==
=== Television ===
- RuPaul's Drag Race (season 16)
- RuPaul's Drag Race: Untucked

=== Web series ===
- Whatcha Packin' (2024)
- Hey Qween! (2024)
- Bring Back My Girls

== See also ==
- List of people from Las Vegas
