= Dawn (drag queen) =

American drag performer (born 1998)

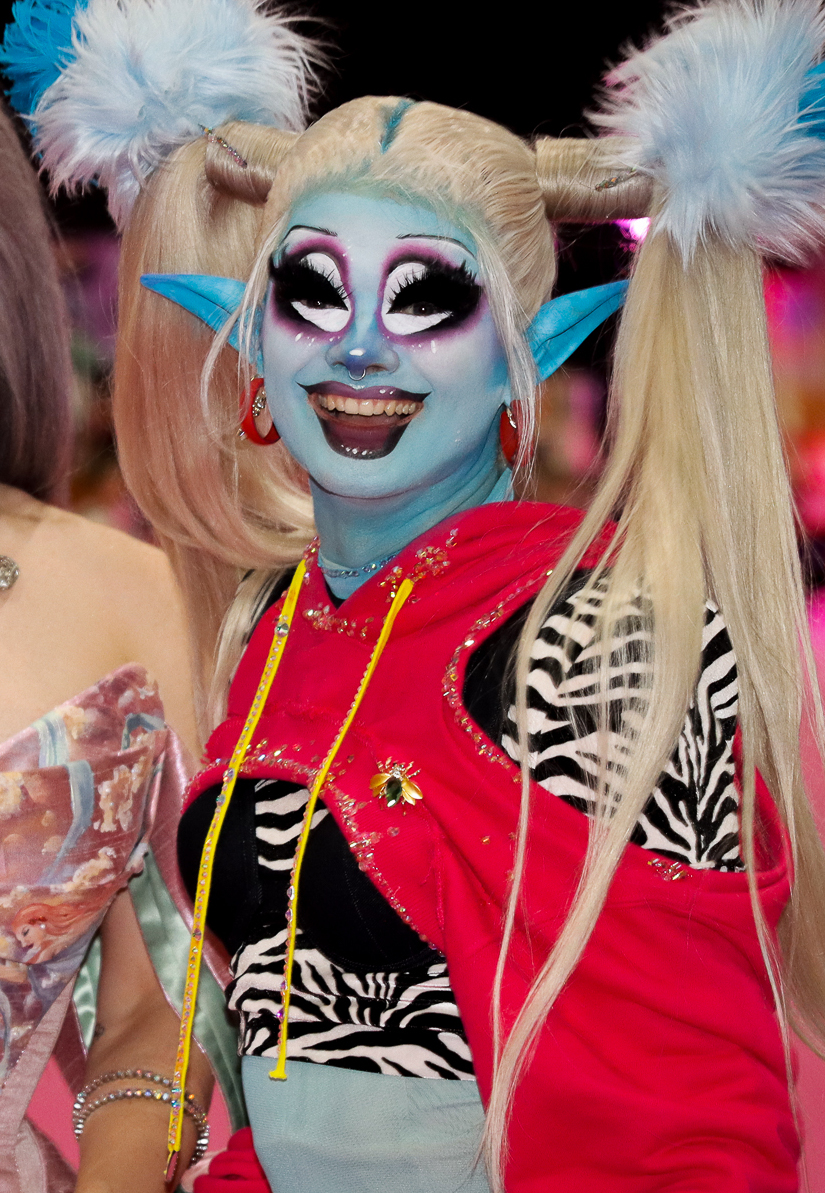
- Dawn at DragCon 2024
- Born: Gaven Kerr; 1998 (age 27–28); Raleigh, North Carolina, U.S.
- Education: North Carolina State University (BS)
- Television: RuPaul's Drag Race (season 16)
- Website: upuntildawn.net

Dawn is the stage name of Gaven Kerr (born 1998), an American drag performer who competed on the sixteenth season of RuPaul's Drag Race and the eleventh season of RuPaul's Drag Race All Stars.

== Career ==
Dawn is a drag performer who has described herself as an "ethereal elf goddess of Brooklyn". She competed on season 16 of RuPaul's Drag Race. On the first episode ("Rate-A-Queen"), she lip-synced to an original track. The judges appreciated Dawn's "kookiness" and compared her to Lucille Ball. Tomás Mier of Rolling Stone called her "out of left field in all the right ways" and said she presented some of the premiere's best looks. Dawn was eliminated on the twelfth episode, "Bathroom Hunties", placing sixth overall. In September 2025, Dawn performed at Northern Nevada Pride.

In April 2026, Dawn was announced to be competing on the eleventh season of RuPaul's Drag Race All Stars in the first bracket. Her season 16 castmates Hershii LiqCour-Jeté and Morphine Love Dion are also competing on the season.

== Personal life ==
Dawn was born and raised in Raleigh, North Carolina, but is based in Brooklyn. She has said Sasha Velour is an inspiration and her favorite Drag Race winner. Dawn is also inspired by fashion designer Betsey Johnson. Dawn is a Taylor Swift fan, and "Toxic" by Britney Spears is among her favorite performance tracks.

She graduated from North Carolina State University in 2020 with an engineering degree.

== Filmography ==
- RuPaul's Drag Race (season 16)
- RuPaul's Drag Race: Untucked (2024)
- Bring Back My Girls
- RuPaul's Drag Race All Stars (season 11)

== See also ==
- LGBTQ culture in New York City
- List of LGBTQ people from New York City
- List of North Carolina State University people
