= Ts Madison =

American TV personality

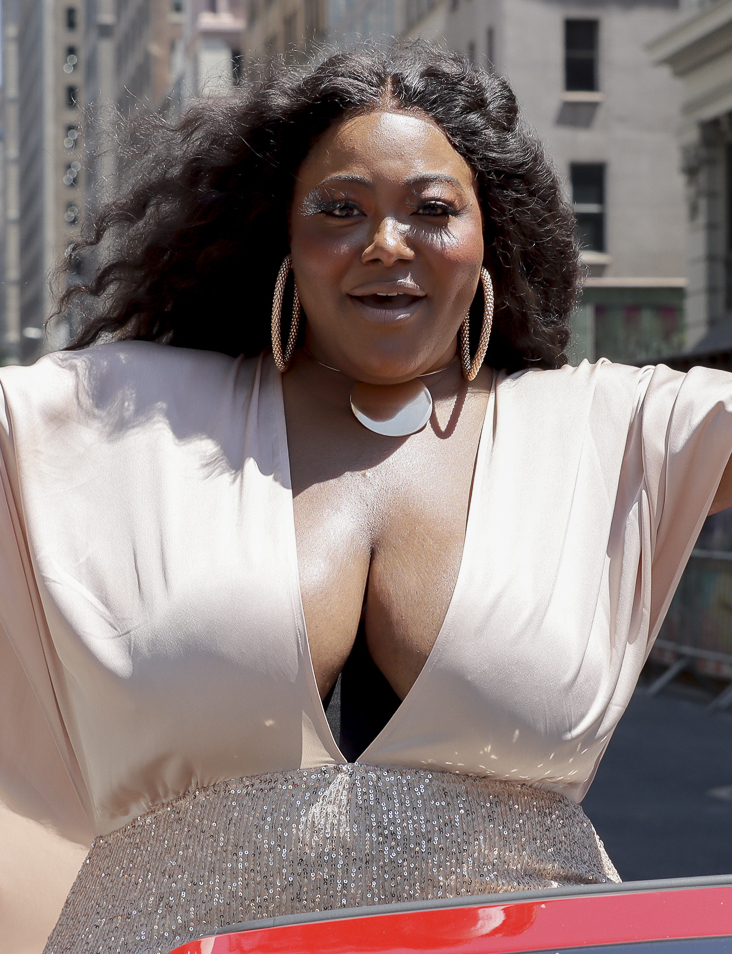
- Madison in 2022
- Born: Miami, Florida, U.S.
- Occupations: Entertainer; actress
- Years active: 2004–present
- Website: thetsmadison.com

Madison Hinton, known professionally as Ts Madison, is an American entertainer and actress. With the reality show The Ts Madison Experience, she became the first Black transgender woman to star in and act as executive producer of her own reality series. She has acted in films including Zola and Bros, and she has been a permanent judge on RuPaul's Drag Race since season 15.

== Life and career ==
A native of Miami, Florida, Madison rose to fame in 2013 after going viral following the release of a Vine clip titled "New Weave 22 Inches”. The video features her exposing her nude body. During this time, Madison was starring in adult films and running a successful production company. On the LGBTQ&A podcast, Madison said she started doing sex work after being fired from multiple jobs for being trans. Madison is a trans woman.

Madison signed a recording contract with Pink Money Records in 2014, releasing her debut EP The New Supreme. Madison published her memoir A Light Through the Shade: An Autobiography of a Queen in 2015. She appeared with Ellis Miah and RuPaul on the song "Drop" in 2016, and collaborated with Todrick Hall on the song "Dick This Big" in 2021.

Madison has had smaller acting roles, such as in Zola and The Perfect Find on Netflix. Madison also appeared in Bros, which was billed as "the first gay romantic comedy from a major studio". Madison has made multiple appearances as a guest judge on RuPaul's Drag Race, later becoming a rotating regular judge from season 15. In 2019, Silky Nutmeg Ganache impersonated Madison in the Snatch Game episode of RuPaul's Drag Race season 11, winning the challenge.

In 2021, The Ts Madison Experience debuted on We TV, making Madison the first black trans woman to star in her own reality show. Madison was also an executive producer on the series.

Madison's voice is sampled on the song "Cozy" on Beyoncé's 2022 album Renaissance, for which Madison received a Grammy Participation Certificate, as the album won the 2023 Grammy Award for Best Dance/Electronic Album.

As a judge on RuPaul's Drag Race season 15, Madison was part of the team that won the 2023 Primetime Emmy Award for Outstanding Reality Competition Program.

On March 31, 2025, Madison opened the TS Madison Starter House, a re-entry home in Atlanta for formerly incarcerated Black trans women. The opening coincided with the Trans Day of Visibility. Madison is creating a docuseries about the program.

== Filmography ==
=== Television ===
Year	Title	Role	Notes
2014	Wait a Minute	Herself	World of Wonder web series
2016	The Comedy Show Show	Herself	1 episode
2018	Fish Tank	Herself	Amazon Prime Video, co-starred with Isis King and Arisce Wanzer
2021	The Ts Madison Experience	Herself	
2021–present	RuPaul's Drag Race	Herself	Guest judge (seasons 13–14, 3 episodes), Main judge (season 15–present)
2022	Turnt Out with TS Madison	Herself	Fox Soul
2022	Hush	Mona Dee	14 episodes
2022–present	Bring Back My Girls	Host	4 seasons, 27 episodes
2023–present	RuPaul's Drag Race All Stars	Herself	Main judge (season 8–present)
2023	The Real Housewives of Atlanta	Herself	Episode: "Peach Passion"
2024	Married to Medicine	Herself	Episode: "A Very Powerful Message"
2024	RuPaul's Drag Race Global All Stars	Herself	Guest judge (Episode: "There's No Place Like Home")
2024–2025	Beauty in Black	Daga	2 seasons, 5 episodes

=== Film ===
Year	Title	Role	Notes
2017	Trans-Me	Madam Belair	Written by B. Octavious Sims and produced by SimGriggs Productions, directed by Sims and Gregory Griggs
2020	Zola	Hollywood	
2022	Bros	Angela	
2023	The Perfect Find	Greta	
2025	Noah's Arc: The Movie	Miss Genevieve	

== Works ==
=== Music ===
EPs

Title	EP details
The New Supreme	Released: October 28, 2015; Label: Pink Money Records; Format: Digital download

Singles

Title	Year
"Is It On?" (with B.Ames)	2014
"Out the Box" (feat. Ellis Miah)	2016
"D.S.L."	2017
"Let Me Pick You Up"	2017
"The Queens Supreme Court (Theme Song)"	2018
"Pop That Ass"	2020
"Is It On (Remix)" (with Flykingi)	2021
"Porta Rikun (Kayno Mix)" (with Kayno)	2022

Guest appearances

Title	Year	Artist	Album
"Drop"	2016	RuPaul	Butch Queen
"Next Caller"	2017	Khia	Non-album single
"Cozy"	2022	Beyoncé	Renaissance

=== Music videos ===
As lead artist

Title	Year
"Feeling My Fish"	2014
"Bang Bang"	2014
"Out the Box" (feat. Ellis Miah)	2016

Guest appearances

Title	Year	Artist	Director
"Tell Me"	2015	Reggie Shelton	Unknown
"Coffee in My Cup"	2021	Rigel Gemini	Cameron Lee Art
"Not a Soul Can Clock (Cor.Ece Remix)"	2025	Monica Beverly Hillz	Merrique Jenson

=== Books ===
- A Light Through the Shade: An Autobiography of a Queen (2015), self-published by CreateSpace

=== Podcast ===
- Outlaws with TS Madison (2025, through IHeartRadio’s Outspoken Podcast Network)

== Awards ==
In 2019, Madison was named to Out's list of 100 influential LGBTQ people. In 2022, Madison and Dominique Morgan were chosen as the Grand Marshals of the NYC Pride Parade.

Year	Award	Category	Nominee(s)	Result	Ref.
2012	Urban X Awards	TS Performer of the Year	Herself	Won	
2016	Transgender Erotica Awards	Lifetime Achievement Award	Herself	Honored	
2022	WOWIE Awards	America's Next Top Meme Award (Best Viral Moment)	"Porto Rikun"	Won	
2022	Trans Film Mentorship at the Toronto Film Festival	Trans Barrier Breaker Award	Herself	Honored	
2023	Queerty Awards	Badass	Herself	Nominated	
2024	Shorty Awards	Best Documentary	LOGO Legend: TS Madison	Won	
2024	Webby Awards	Video, Variety & Reality	Bring Back My Girls with TS Madison	Honored	
2025	Atlanta Black Pride	Humanitarian Award	Herself	Honored	
2026	GLAAD Media Awards	Outstanding Podcast	Outlaws with TS Madison	Nominated	
2026	Queerty Awards	Podcast	Outlaws with TS Madison	Nominated	
2026	Queerty Awards	Badass	Herself	Nominated	
2026	BET Black + Iconic Awards Soiree	Miss Major Pioneer of the Year Award	Herself	Honored	
