= Xunami Muse =

Panamanian drag performer

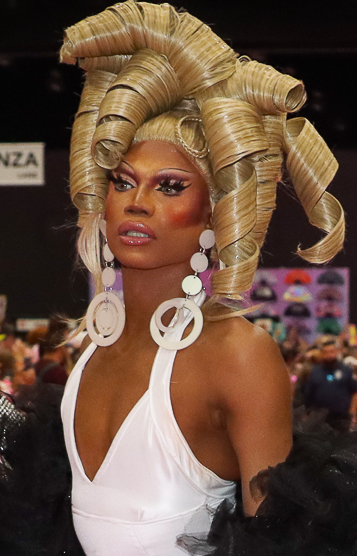
- Xunami Muse at RuPaul's DragCon LA, 2024
- Born: Michael Alexander White; 1989 or 1990 (age 35–36); Colón, Panama
- Occupation: Drag queen
- Years active: 2018–present
- Television: RuPaul's Drag Race (season 16)

Michael Alexander White, better known as Xunami Muse, is a Panamanian drag performer formerly based in the United States (under DACA). She competed on season 16 of RuPaul's Drag Race, where she placed 9th and was given the title of Miss Congeniality alongside Sapphira Cristál. She is set to compete on Drag Race México: Latina Royale in 2026.

== Early life ==
White was born and raised in Colón, Panama, and moved to Brooklyn at the age of thirteen in 2002. She also lived in New Jersey before moving to Washington Heights, Manhattan.

== Career ==
White has been described as a drag performer, model, and collection coordinator. She first discovered drag at a club named La Escuelita, and first performed as Xunami in March 2018.

Xunami was later adopted as the "drag daughter" of Kandy Muse, who competed on season 13 of RuPaul's Drag Race. During the COVID-19 pandemic in 2020, Xunami Muse was part of the line-up of "Digital Drag: An Online Drag Show", which streamed on Twitch. In December 2023, she was announced as a contestant for the sixteenth season of Drag Race. She is the second contestant from Panama to compete on the series, after Serena ChaCha of season five. She placed 9th overall in the season, and was voted as Miss Congeniality, alongside Sapphira Cristál, by their fellow contestants.

== Personal life ==
In July 2025, White announced her relocation to her native Panama.

== Filmography ==
=== Television ===
List of television credits, with selected details
| Year | Title | Role | Notes | Ref. |
|---|---|---|---|---|
| 2024 | RuPaul's Drag Race | Contestant | Season 16: 9th Place/Miss Congeniality (9 episodes) | |
| 2024 | Bring Back My Girls | Herself | Season 4: Guest (2 episodes) | |
| 2026 | Drag Race México: Latina Royale | Contestant | Season 1: 8th place (6 episodes) | |

== See also ==
- LGBTQ culture in New York City
- List of LGBTQ people from New York City
