= Welcome to the DollHouse (RuPaul's Drag Race) =

- RuPaul's Drag Race episode
- Episode no.: Season 16; Episode 6
- Presented by: RuPaul
- Original air date: February 9, 2024

Guest appearance
- Charo

Episode chronology
← Previous "Girl Groups"	Next → "The Sound of Rusic"

"Welcome to the DollHouse" is the sixth episode of the sixteenth season of the American television series RuPaul's Drag Race. It originally aired on February 9, 2024. The episode's main challenge tasks the contestants with creating dolls based on their drag personas. Law Roach is a guest judge and Charo also makes a guest appearance for the mini-challenge.

Q wins the episode's main challenge. Geneva Karr is eliminated from the competition after placing in the bottom and losing a lip-sync against Mhi'ya Iman Le'Paige to "Control" (1986) by Janet Jackson.

== Episode ==
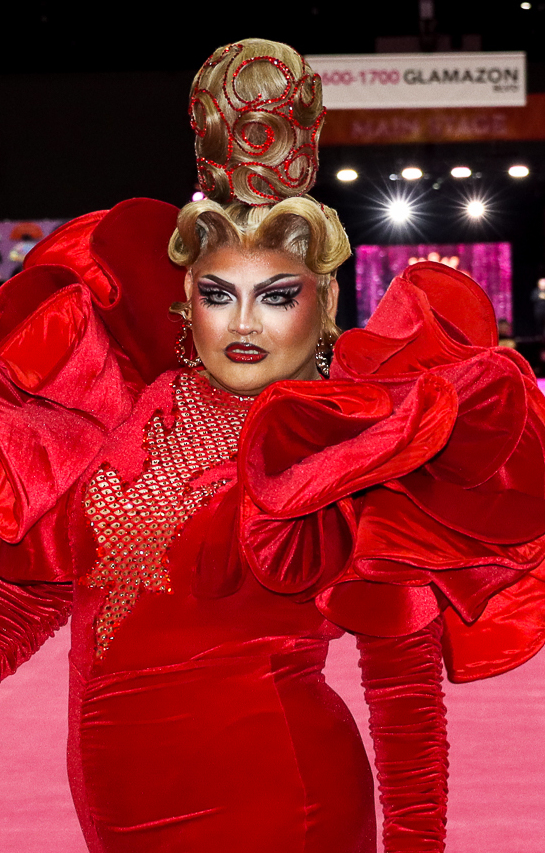
Geneva Karr (pictured at RuPaul's DragCon LA in 2024) is eliminated from the competition.

The contestants return to the Werk Room after Amanda Tori Meating's elimination from the competition. On a new day, RuPaul greets the group and invites Charo to join. RuPaul reveals the mini-challenge, which tasks the contestants with getting into "quick flamenco drag" for a dance contest. Xunami Muse is declared the winner of the mini-challenge.

RuPaul then reveals the main challenge, which tasks the contestants with creating dolls based on their drag personas. The contestants must create identical looks from scratch for themselves and for the dolls. Before leaving, RuPaul shares that Law Roach will be a guest judge. The contestants gather materials and begin to create their outfits. On elimination day, the contestants make final preparations in the Werk Room for the fashion show. Geneva Karr discusses styling her leg hair. The group also discuss how they played with dolls as children. Plane Jane talks about how she was discouraged from having dolls or other feminine traits. Q talks about growing up with limited means but ultimately having the support of her family.

On the main stage, RuPaul welcomes fellow judges Michelle Visage and Ts Madison, as well as guest judge Roach. RuPaul shares the assignment of the main challenge and the runway category ("Welcome to the DollHouse"), then the fashion show commences. The contestants present their looks, then RuPaul asks Sapphira Cristál and Plane Jane if either would like to use their Immunity Potion. Sapphira Cristál confirms that she is using hers, while Plane Jane declines to use hers. The judges deliver their critiques, deliberate, then share the results with the contestants. Q is declared the winner of the main challenge. Geneva Karr and Mhi'ya Iman Le'Paige place in the bottom and face off in a lip-sync contest to "Control" (1986) by Janet Jackson. Mhi'ya Iman Le'Paige wins the lip-sync and Geneva Karr is eliminated from the competition.

== Production and broadcast ==
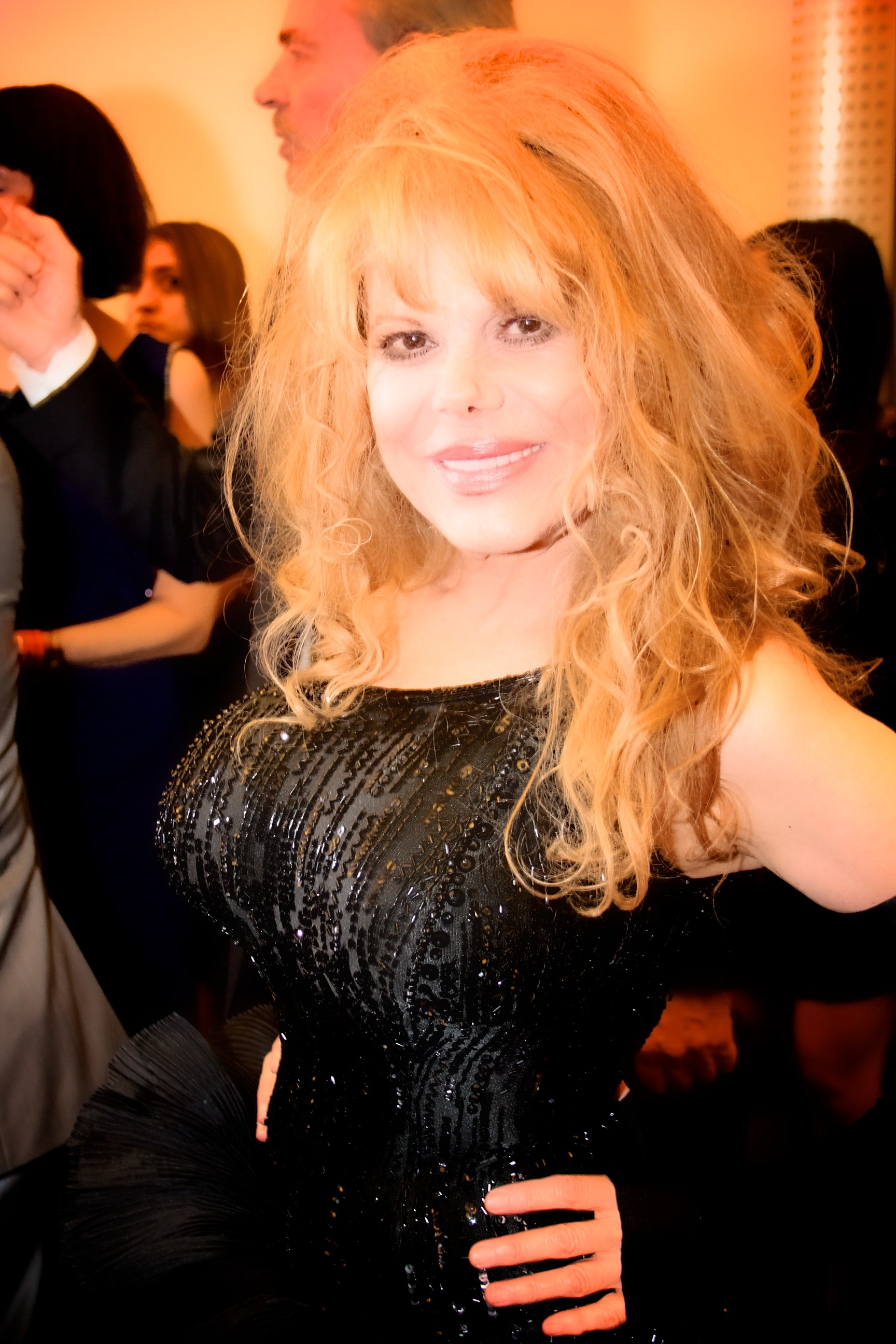
Charo (pictured in 2013) makes a guest appearance for the mini-challenge.

The episode originally aired on February 9, 2024.

The episode has a "Barbie-themed" design challenge, according to Matthew Huff of Parade. Stephen Daw of Billboard said Mhi'ya Iman Le'Paige performed "backflips, splits, kick-ups, spins, twirls, dips and every other acrobatic feat known to mankind" during the lip-sync contest.

=== Fashion ===
For the main stage, RuPaul wears a short green dress and a blonde wig.

For the fashion show, Xunami Muse has blue bell-bottoms, a purple top, and a matching scarf tied as a bow around her neck. She wears blue gloves and a red wig. Sapphira Cristál has a blue dress with a white floral print. She wears a blue choker and a red wig. Plasma has a blue dress with a scarf, as well as a red wig. Plane Jane wears a short blue dress with a train, as well as a matching wig styled as a ponytail. Nymphia Wind has a yellow outfit with a large pink bow. She wears matching high-heeled shoes and a yellow wig. Morphine Love Dion has a flowy colorful outfit with a floral print and a long blonde wig. She smiles to reveal a blacked out tooth, made to appear as missing. Mhi'ya Iman Le'Paige wears a pink outfit with a cape and a matching headband, as well as light blue high-heels and a large blonde wig. Megami has a blue outfit, an orange crown, and a blonde wig. She has butterflies attached to one of her shoulders and she carries a paper cup. Geneva Karr has a short blue-and-white dress, white high-heels, and a dark wig. Dawn has a blue-and-silver dress with blue gloves and fabric covering the top of her head. Q wears a metallic-looking outfit with wings made of wire and a headpiece. She throws glitter on the stage.

== Reception ==
Jason P. Frank of Vulture rated the episode three out of five stars. Stephen Daw ranked the "Control" performance third in Billboard's list of the season's lip-sync contests, writing: "Leading up to episode six, Mhi’ya Iman Le’Paige waxed poetic time and time again about her lip synching abilities, both to the other contestants and to the audience at home. So, when she finally took to the stage for this smackdown against Geneva Karr, fans were ready to watch her put her money where her mouth was — but they weren’t ready for her to tear up the stage quite like this." Daw said Mhi'ya Iman Le'Paige "established herself early on as the one to beat in a Lip Sync For Your Life by putting on a killer show for everyone watching".
