= Girl Groups (RuPaul's Drag Race season 16) =

- RuPaul's Drag Race episode
- Episode no.: Season 16; Episode 5
- Presented by: RuPaul
- Original air date: February 2, 2024

Guest appearance
- Icona Pop

Episode chronology
← Previous "RDR Live!"	Next → "Welcome to the DollHouse"

"Girl Groups" is the fifth episode of the sixteenth season of the American television series RuPaul's Drag Race. It originally aired on February 2, 2024. The episode's main challenge tasks the contestants with writing and performing original verses for songs by RuPaul. The members of the Swedish synth-pop duo Icona Pop are guest judges. Geneva Karr, Megami, Mhi'ya Iman Le'Paige, and Nymphia Wind win the main challenge. Amanda Tori Meating is eliminated from the competition, after placing in the bottom and losing a lip-sync against Q to "Emergency" (2015) by Icona Pop.

== Episode ==
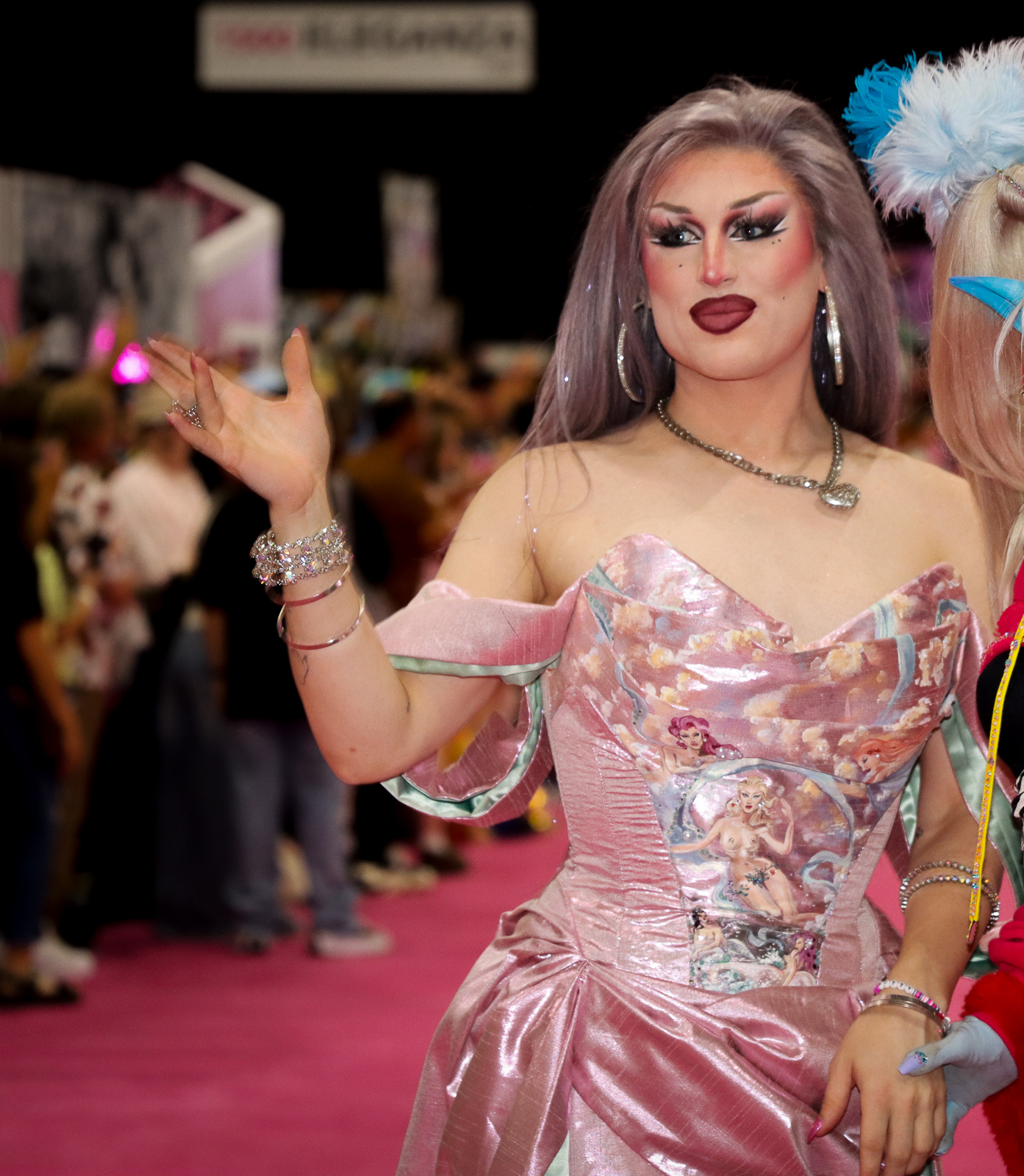
Amanda Tori Meating (pictured at RuPaul's DragCon LA in 2024) is eliminated from the competition.

The contestants return to the Werk Room after Mirage's elimination on the previous episode. On a new day, RuPaul greets the group and reveals the mini-challenge, which tasks the contestants with creating a front cover and author biography for a bestseller. Sapphira Cristál wins the mini challenge. RuPaul then reveals the main challenge, which tasks the contestants with writing and performing original verses for RuPaul songs from the album Black Butta, in groups of four. The contestants must record vocals and come up with choreography. Geneva Karr, Plasma, and Sapphira Cristál are named captains and select their fellow teammates. "Star Baby" will be performed by Team Q.D.S.M., which includes Dawn, Q, Morphine Love Dion, and Sapphira Cristál. "Courage to Love" will be performed by Team Lovah Girlz, which includes Amanda Tori Meating, Plane Jane, Plasma, and Xunami Muse "A.S.M.R Lover" will be performed by Team Thicc & Stick, which includes Geneva Karr, Megami, Mhi'ya Iman Le'Paige, and Nymphia Wind.

The contestants break into groups and begin to brainstorm and write lyrics in the Werk Room. The groups rehearse choreography on the main stage. On a new day, the contestants make final preparations in the Werk Room for the performances and fashion show. Q tries to have a discussion with Plane Jane, who then brings Amanda Tori Meating into an argument. Plane Jane apologies to Q. On the main stage, RuPaul welcomes fellow judges Michelle Visage and Ts Madison, as well as members of the Swedish synth-pop duo Icona Pop who are guest judges. The groups perform for the judges. RuPaul shares the runway category ("Faster Pussycat, Wig, Wig"), then the fashion show commences. After the contestants present their looks, the judges deliver their critiques, deliberate, then share the results with the group. Team Thicc & Stick is the winning team, with Geneva Karr, Megami, Mhi'ya Iman Le'Paige, and Nymphia Wind all winning the challenge. Team Q.D.S.M. and Team Lovah Girlz are the losing teams. Amanda Tori Meating and Q receive negative critiques, and are announced as the bottom two, while the rest of the queens are declared safe. Amanda Tori Meating and Q face off in a lip-sync contest to "Emergency" (2015) by Icona Pop. Q wins the lip-sync and Amanda Tori Meating is eliminated from the competition.

== Production and broadcast ==
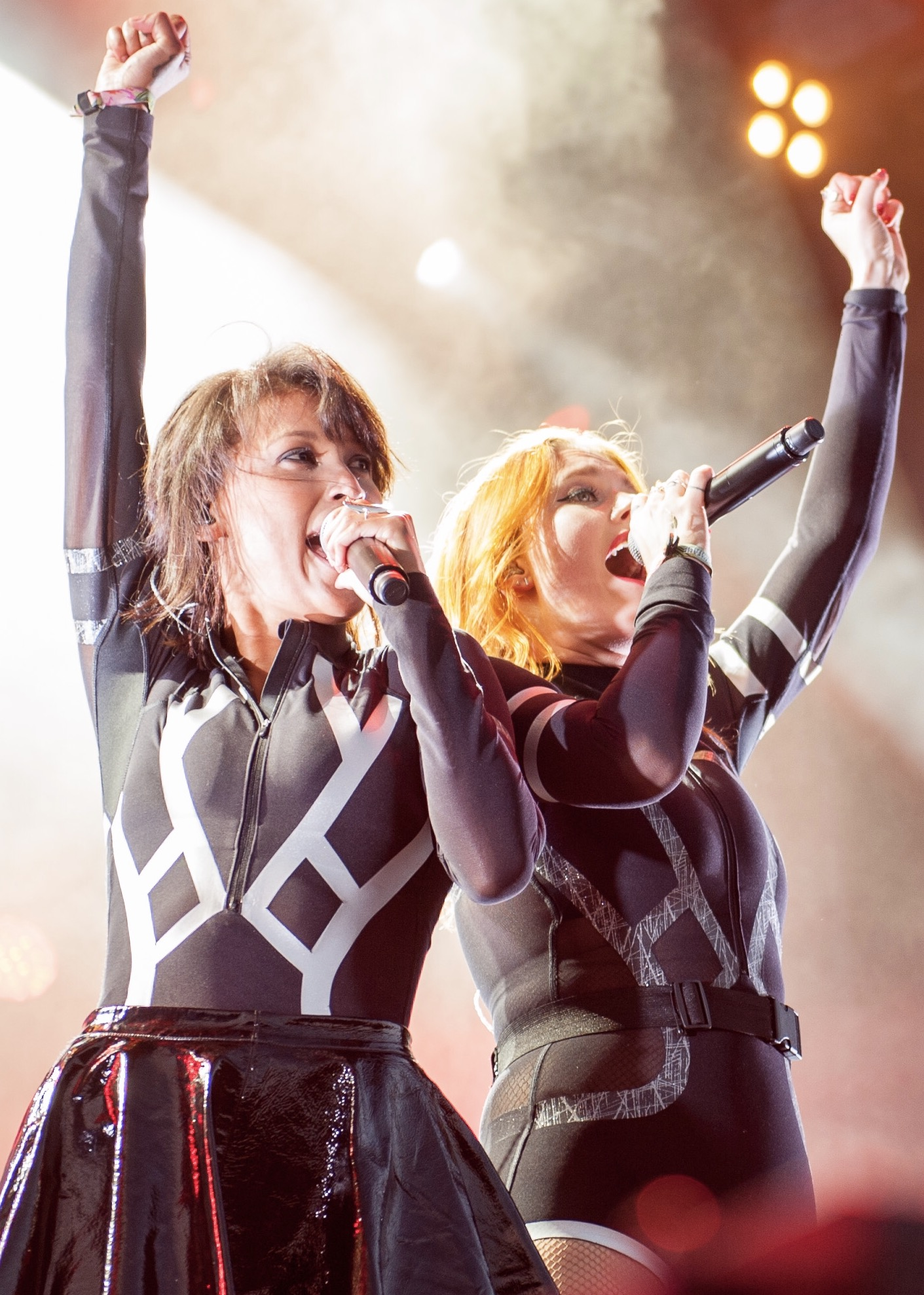
Icona Pop (pictured in 2014)

The episode originally aired on February 2, 2024.

For the mini-challenge, Sapphira Cristál's "memoir" is called Throat Goat: A Singers' Guide to an Open Pharyngeal Wall.

During the lip-sync contest, Amanda Tori Meating and Q "pulled out all of the stops — dancing, emoting and selling every beat of the song", according to Stephen Daw of Billboard.

=== Fashion ===
In the Werk Room, RuPaul wears a colorful suit. For the mini-challenge, Mhi'ya Iman Le'Paige dresses like Catwoman. Sapphira Cristál wore a brown fur coat, high-heeled shoes, and a tall wig. Q wears pants with polka dots.

For the main challenge, Morphine Love Dion wears a green outfit, white shoes, and a long wig. Q has a blue outfit with matching high-heeled shoes a blonde wig. Sapphira Cristál wears a red outfit and a long brown wig. Dawn has a purple outfit, white shoes, and a blonde wig. Plasma has a dark outfit with cutouts and a pink wig. Amanda Tori Meating's outfit is black and pink. Her wig is blonde. Xunami Muse's outfit includes black pants and a large pink flower. Plane Jane has a black bodysuit, matching tall boots, and a long ponytail. Mhi'ya Iman Le'Paige has a black outfit and a yellow wig. Geneva Karr's outfit is black and yellow. She has tall black boots and a brown wig. Megami has a black outfit and matching boots, with yellow earrings. Nymphia Wind has a yellow outfit with matching boots and wig.

For the fashion show, Morphine Love Dion has a black outfit with stitches and a short red wig. Q wears a knight-inspired outfit with a corset. Sapphira Cristál wears a "blindingly white dress with large shoulders and a cat's face in the back of her wig", according to the Philly Voice. The magazine's Chris Compendio said Sapphira Cristál removes her wig "to reveal her bald head and [does] a Dr. Evil pose". Her wig resembles a cat. Dawn's outfit has multiple patterns. It has denim and rhinestones. Her wig has a bowl cut. Plasma's Hermes-inspired outfit is gold and white. She wears headphones with wings. Amanda Tori Meating wears an outfit resembling a bird nest. Xunami Muse matador-inspired has black pants, a red jacket, and a short wig. Plane Jane has a black and tan outfit made of latex. She has a blonde pussycat wig. Geneva Karr wears a 1920s-inspired outfit. Mhi'ya Iman Le'Paige's has a black outfit with pointed shoulders and a short wig. Megami wears a short light blue outfit with white high-heeled shoes and a short wig worn backwards. Nymphia Wind wears a red outfit with matching shoes. Her removes her wig to reveal a cat, which is then removed to reveal a bald head.

== Reception ==
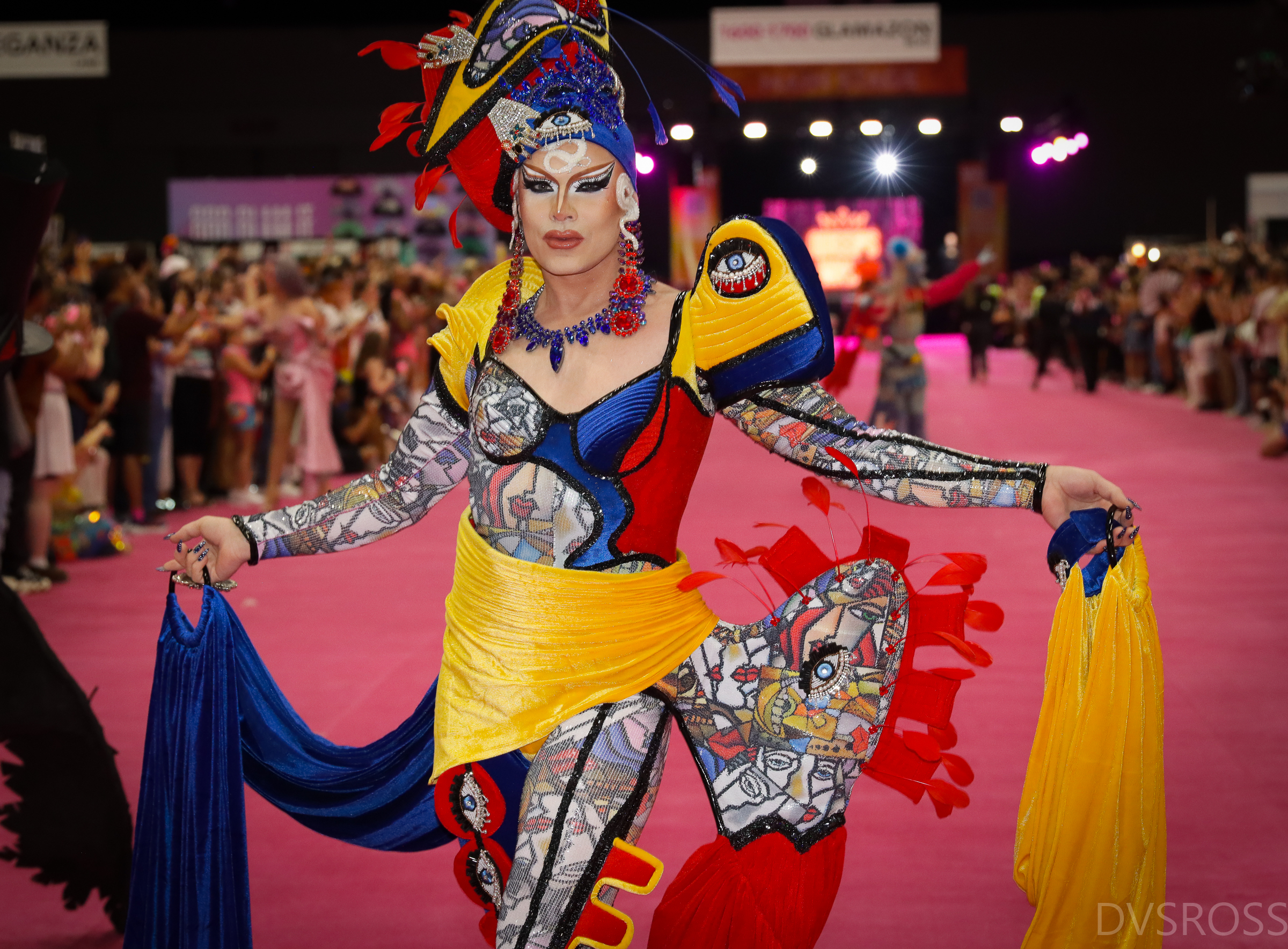
Q (pictured at RuPaul's DragCon LA in 2024) wins the episode's lip-sync contest.

Jason P. Frank of Vulture rated the episode four out of five stars. Joey Nolfi of Entertainment Weekly called Amanda Tori Meeting's elimination "shocking" because she received "generally positive feedback from the judges" and Visage called her performance "top-notch". Stephen Daw ranked the "Emergency" performance number 17 in Billboard's list of the season's lip-sync contests, writing: "Amanda may have been sent home this episode, but let's not get it twisted — she certainly did not lose this lip sync. Q gave a serviceable performance, giving some camp and humor where it worked best for her. But Amanda, despite her absolutely wild robin's egg look, fully committed to the song and served up enough energy to make this performance feel like an 'Emergency.' It makes sense why Q stayed in the competition, but that doesn't change the fact that Amanda handily ate this lip sync up." Sam Samshenas of Gay Times included the "Emergency" performance in a list of six lip-sync "verdicts that enraged fans", saying "viewers were unanimous in their sentiment that Amanda 'bodied' this lip-sync and 'ate' up her competitor". Bernardo Sim included Amanda Tori Meating in Out 's 2024 list of fifteen contestants "who were shockingly eliminated" after one lip-sync. Sim called the contest "good" and said her elimination "was a huge gag for the fans".

== See also ==
- Girl groups in the Drag Race franchise
- Icona Pop discography
