= The Sound of Rusic =

- RuPaul's Drag Race episode
- Episode no.: Season 16; Episode 7
- Presented by: RuPaul
- Original air date: February 16, 2024

Guest appearances
- Adam Shankman (guest judge); Melissa McCarthy

Episode chronology
← Previous "Welcome to the DollHouse"	Next → "Snatch Game"

"The Sound of Rusic" is the seventh episode of the sixteenth season of the American television series RuPaul's Drag Race. It originally aired on February 16, 2024. The episode's main challenge tasks the contestants with performing in a "Rusical" (musical theatre production) parody of The Sound of Music, directed by Adam Shankman. American actress Melissa McCarthy also makes a guest appearance. Plasma wins the main challenge. Megami is eliminated from the competition after placing in the bottom and losing a lip-sync contest against Mhi'ya Iman Le'Paige to "Flowers" by Miley Cyrus.

== Episode ==
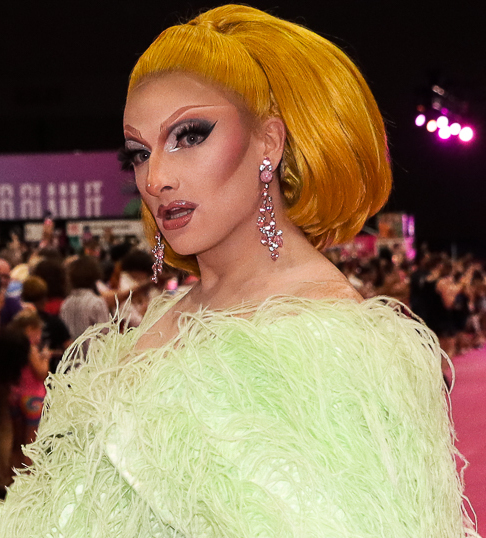
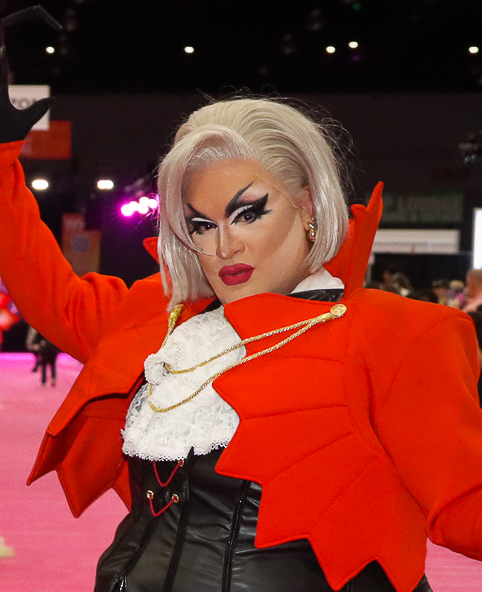
Plasma (right, pictured at RuPaul's DragCon LA in 2024) wins the episode's main challenge; Megami (right, pictured at the same event) is eliminated from the competition.

The contestants return to the Werk Room after Geneva Karr's elimination on the previous episode. On a new day, RuPaul greets the group and reveals the main challenge, which tasks the contestants with performing in a "Rusical" parody of The Sound of Music, directed by Adam Shankman. The contestants listen to a recording of the musical and decide on which roles to play. Plasma fights for the lead role. Following is the Rusical's cast:

- Dawn as Strudel Von Snapp
- Megami as Schnitzel Von Snapp
- Mhi'ya Iman Le'Paige as a Sister Sister
- Morphine Love Dion as a Sister Fister
- Nymphia Wind as Diesel Von Snapp
- Plane Jane as a Baronette Eva
- Plasma as Mariah Grande
- Q as Baroness Braun
- Sapphira Cristál as Mother Superior
- Xunami Muse as a Baronette Magda

The contestants begin to rehearse in the Werk Room, then continue with Shankman on the main stage. Melissa McCarthy also makes a guest appearance as Shankman's "assistant". On elimination day, the contestants make final preparations in the Werk Room for the musical and fashion show. Plane Jane talks about her experience as a ballroom dancer. Megami talks about the impact of seeing the character Edna in Hairspray performed by a drag artist on Broadway.

On the main stage, RuPaul welcomes fellow judges Michelle Visage and Ross Mathews, as well as guest judge Shankman. The contestants perform the musical. RuPaul reveals the runway category ("I Can Buy Myself Flowers"), then the fashion show commences. After the contestants present their looks, the judges deliver their critiques, deliberate, then share the results with the group. Plasma is declared the winner of the main challenge. Megami and Mhi'ya Iman Le'Paige place in the bottom and face off in a lip-sync contest to "Flowers" (2023) by Miley Cyrus. Mhi'ya Iman Le'Paige wins the lip-sync and Megami is eliminated from the competition. She returns to the Werk Room to leave a mirror message for the remaining contestants.

== Production and broadcast ==
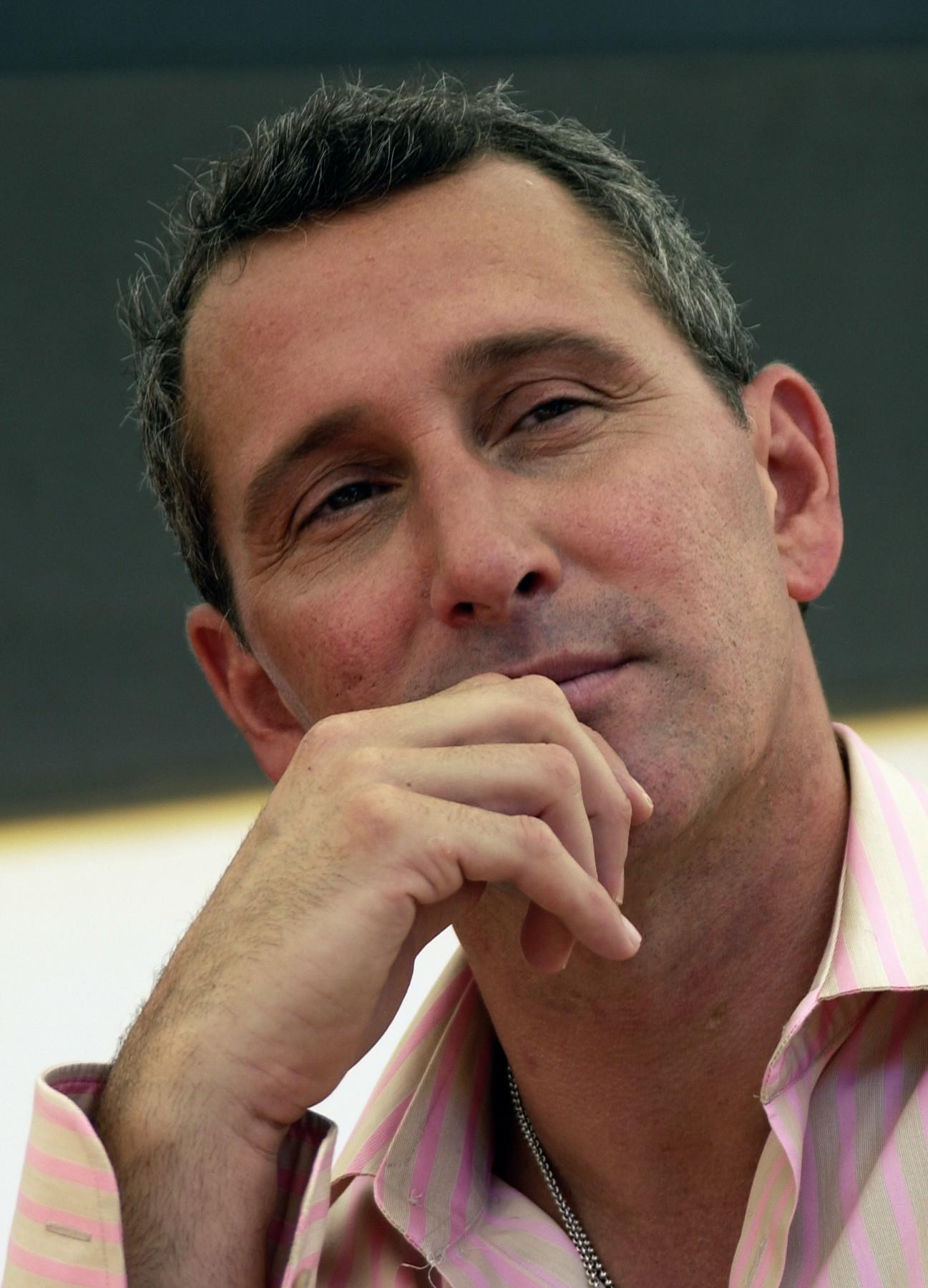
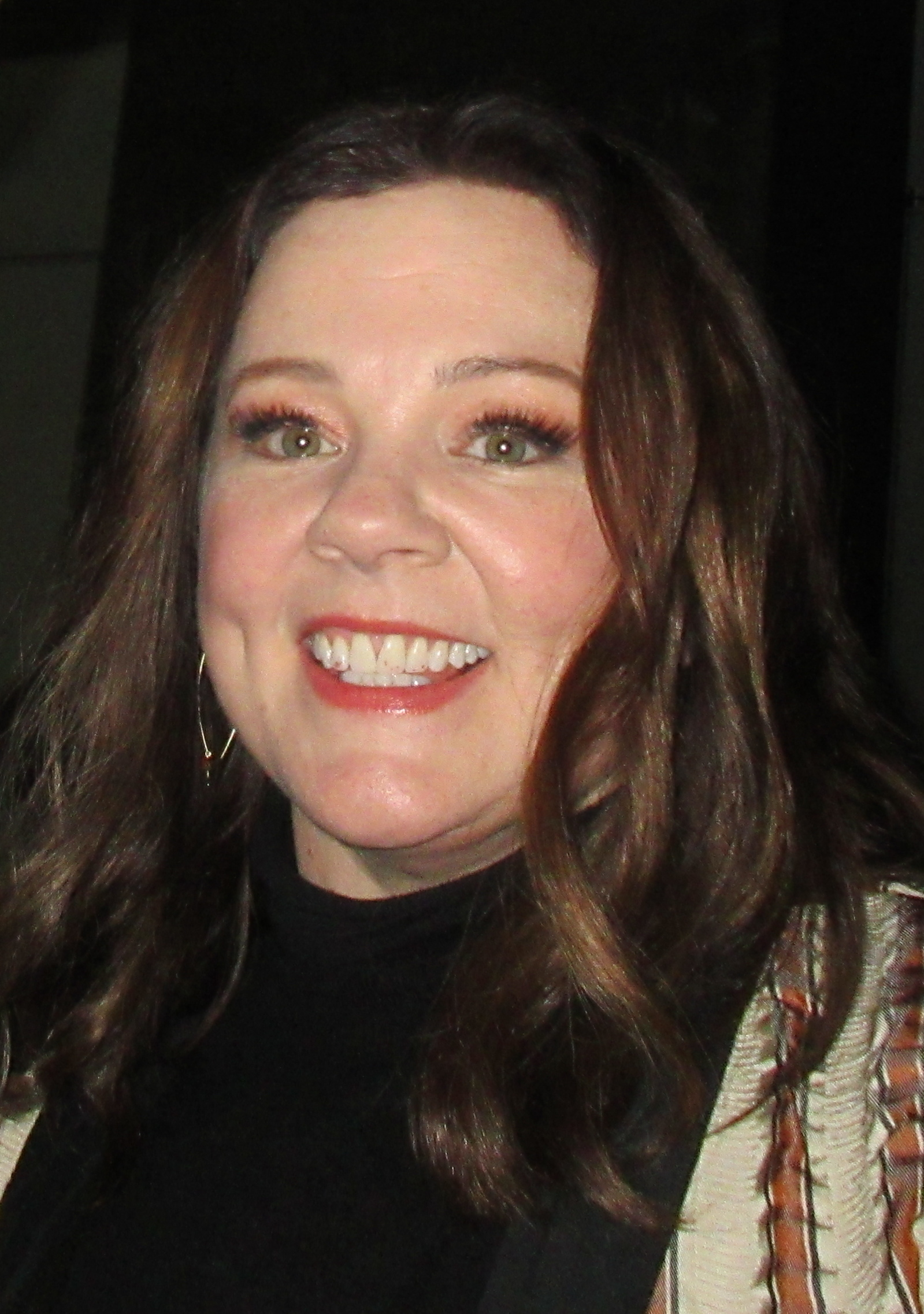
Adam Shankman (left, pictured in 2007) directed the episode's Rusical; Melissa McCarthy (right, pictured in 2018) also makes a guest appearance.

The episode originally aired on February 16, 2024.

In the Rusical. the part with Plane Jane, Q, and Xunami Muse musically references "Break Up (Bye Bye)", a 2019 song by the Frock Destroyers from the British adaptation RuPaul's Drag Race UK.

In the corresponding episode of RuPaul's Drag Race: Untucked, Megami shares with Q how she feels about her choreography.

=== Fashion ===
In the Werk Room, RuPaul wears a purple suit, a purple dress shirt with white polka dots, and a large flower accent. For the main stage, RuPaul wears a dress with multiple colors, including a light blue bottom, a black-and-white striped middle, and a pink top, as well as black gloves and a red wig.

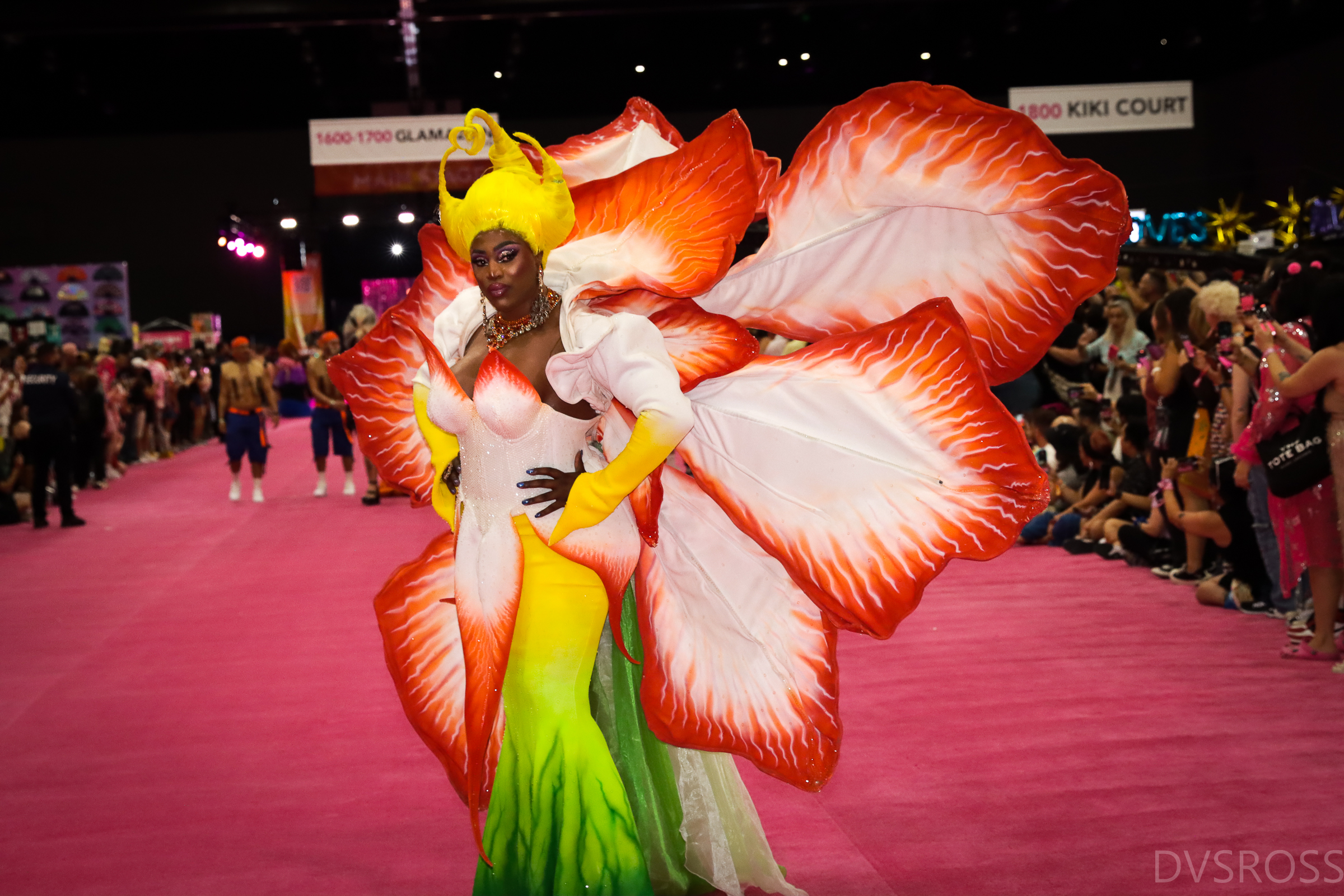
Sapphira Cristál wearing her outfit from the episode's fashion show at RuPaul's DragCon LA in 2024

In the Rusical, the first girl group (Morphine Love Dion, Mhi'ya Iman Le'Paige, and Sapphira Cristál) dress as nuns. The second group (Dawn, Megami, and Nymphia Wind) have matching outfits and wigs with different colors and styles. Nymphia Wind carries a gold conifer cone. The third group (Plane Jane, Q, and Xunami Muse) wear matching yellow sequined gowns, gloves, silver jewelry, and blonde wigs. Q also wears a long white coat and matching gloves. Plasma has a short blonde wig. Pit Crew members wear lederhosen.

For the fashion show, Plasma wears a dress with yellow roses, a red wig, and a large hat. She carries an umbrella. Sapphira Cristál's outfit has large petals as wings. Morphine Love Dion presents a hippie-inspired look with a long blonde wig and a headpiece made of flowers. She pretends to consume LSD via a tab of blotter paper. Mhi'ya Iman Le'Paige has a red dress with a matching hat, gloves, and jewelry. Dawn wears a blue-and-red outfit, a blonde wig, and horns as a headpiece. Megami wears a short wedding dress covered in flowers. Nymphia Wind's outfit resembles a plant. She wears yellow high-heeled shoes. Q's pink outfit is inspired by a lotus mantis. Plane Jane's look is inspired by Rapunzel. She has a long braid. Xunani Muse's outfit inspired by an upside-down flower bouquet and has cellophane.

== Reception ==
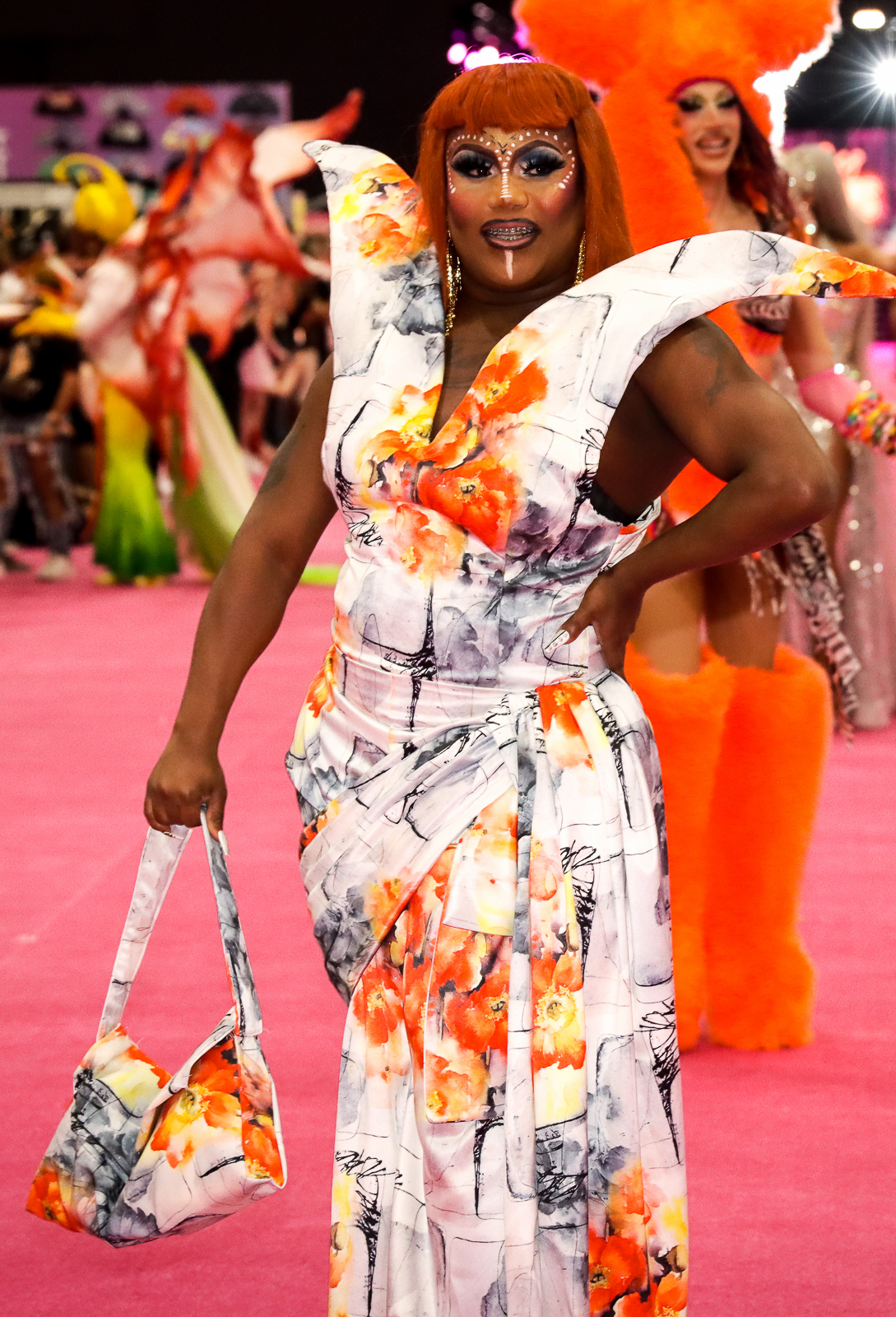
Billboard praised Mhi'ya Iman Le'Paige (pictured at RuPaul's DragCon LA in 2024) for her performance in the lip-sync contest.

Vulture's Jason P. Frank rated the episode four out of five stars. Matthew Huff of Parade described the Rusical as "somehow a mashup of The Sound of Music (obviously) and Pitch Perfect (weirdly)". Mikelle Street of Gay Times said the Rusical "shows off Plasma deeply in her element as the lead". Barry Levitt ranked The Sound of Rusic fourteenth in Vulture's list of the show's Rusicals, writing "the songs are fun — the Von Snap number is especially catchy". Stephen Daw of Billboard said Mhi'ya Iman Le'Paige "expertly evoked the singer's self-loving energy with a pitch-perfect performance" and called Megami's performance "earnest" and "sobering". He also ranked the "Flowers" performance thirteenth in the magazine's list of the season's lip-sync contests, in which he said, "Without a single stunt, Mhi'ya showed herself to be not just a killer lip sync artist, but a versatile one at that." Daw opined:

You know you're a good lip-syncer when you can break a cardinal rule of the format and still survive. Mhi'ya Iman Le'Paige knew as well as everyone else that, when battling it out on Drag Race, you never remove your heels. Yet, even with her shoes off, Mhi'ya exuded nothing but pure confidence with this Miley Cyrus hit. Megami's choice to play the song more like a heartbreaking ballad proved to be the wrong choice — especially while Mhi'ya was right next to her, giving the lyric "I can take myself dancing" a physical manifestation.
