= Werq the World (RuPaul's Drag Race episode) =

- RuPaul's Drag Race episode
- Episode no.: Season 16; Episode 10

Guest appearances
- Leland; Jamal Sims

Episode chronology
| ← Previous "See You Next Wednesday" | Next → "Corporate Queens" |

"Werq the World" is the tenth episode of the sixteenth season of the American television series RuPaul's Drag Race. It originally aired on March 8, 2024. The episode's main challenge tasks contestants with writing and performing verses on the inspirational anthem "Power". Jamal Sims is a guest judge. Leland is also a special guest. No contestants are eliminated from the competition. Morphine Love Dion and Sapphira Cristál face off in a lip-sync contest to "Made You Look" by Meghan Trainor, which is won by the latter contestant.

== Episode ==
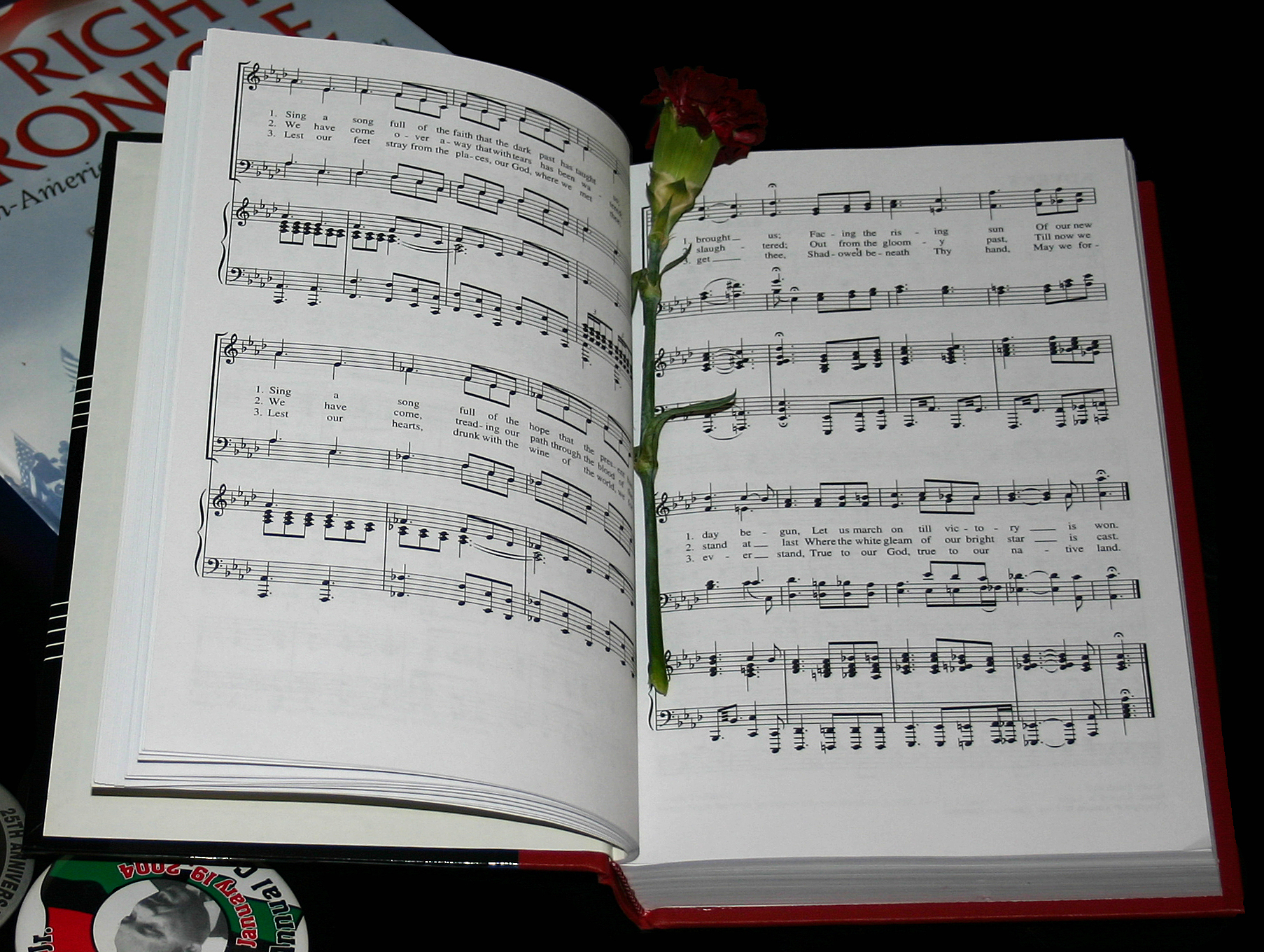
Sheet music of "Lift Every Voice and Sing", a hymn that inspired Sapphira Cristál's lyrics for her verse to "Power".

In the Werk Room, RuPaul describes the importance of voting and reveals the episode's main challenge, which tasks contestants with writing and performing verses on the inspirational anthem "Power", a song to be featured in the Werq the World tour. RuPaul says vocals will be recorded with the song's composers, Leland and Freddy Scott. During a writing session, Sapphira Cristál says her lyrics are inspired by the hymn "Lift Every Voice and Sing", while Nymphia Wind struggles to find inspiration for her lyrics. After a vocal recording session, the contestants receive choreography coaching from Jamal Sims on the main stage. While preparing for the runway in the Werk Room, Dawn shares about her experiences with mental health and therapy. Nymphia Wind asks Plane Jane if she plans to use the immunity potion earned earlier in the season. The contestants discuss the importance of voting at all levels of government.

On the main stage, RuPaul welcomes fellow panelists Michelle Visage, Ross Mathews, and guest judge Sims. The contestants perform "Power" with a band and backup dancers. The runway category is "True Colors". Plane Jane offers her immunity potion to Nymphia Wind. Nymphia accepts and is declared safe before critiques begin. RuPaul asks if the contestants if they are registered to vote, and encourages viewers to register in order to participate in upcoming elections. The remaining contestants received largely positive critiques, with Morphine Love Dion and Sapphira Cristál being announced as the top two. In the spirit of "united we stand, divided we fall", RuPaul decides no one will be eliminated from the competition on this episode. Morphine Love Dion and Sapphira Cristál face off in a lip-sync to "Made You Look" (2022) by Meghan Trainor. Sapphira Cristál wins.

== Production and broadcast ==
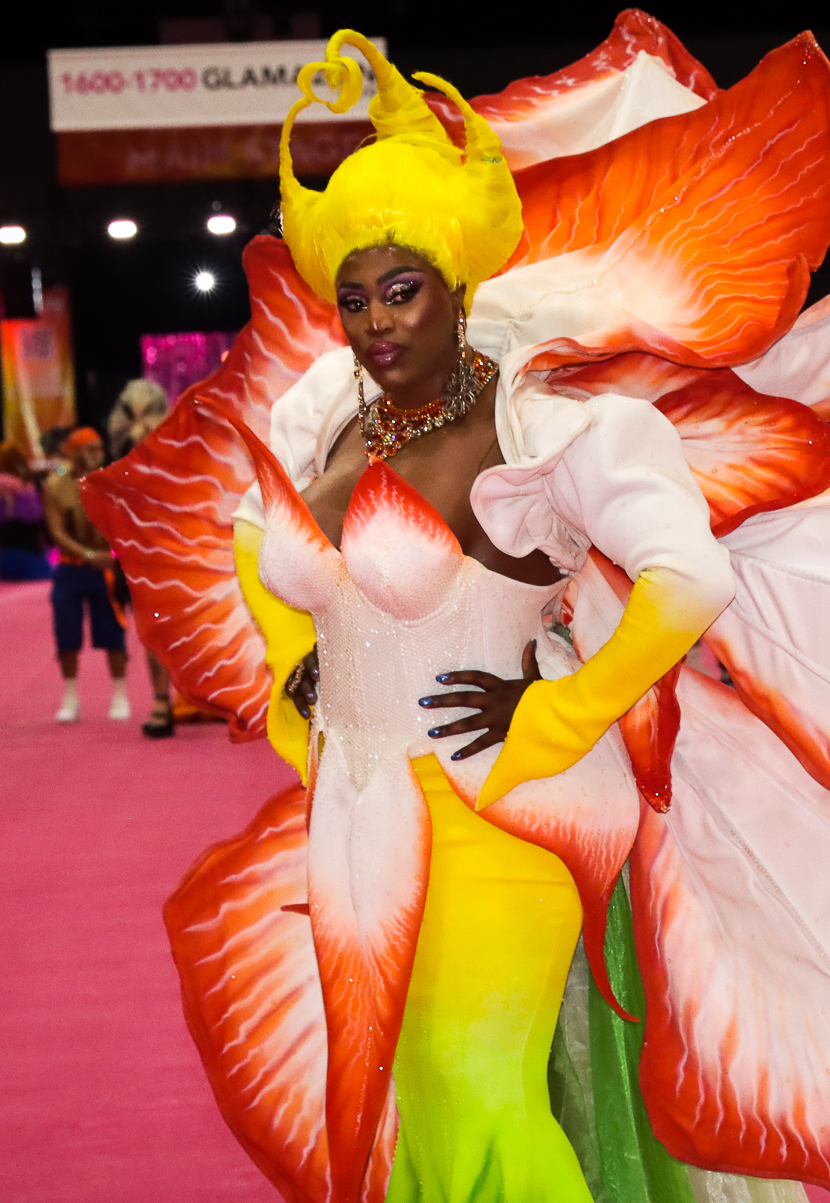
Sapphira Cristál (pictured at RuPaul's DragCon LA in 2024) wins the episode's lip-sync contest.

The episode originally aired on March 8, 2024.

The song "Power" is composed by Leland and Freddie Scott. Dawn, Mhi'ya Iman Le'Paige, Morphine Love Dion, Nymphia Wind, Q, Plane Jane, and Sapphira Cristál later performed the song at Culver City Library.

=== Fashion ===
For the fashion show, Mhi'ya Iman Le'Paige wears a red dress. Nymphia Wind has a yellow dress covered in bananas. Plane Jane presents a dress covered in green stones in geometric patterns. Sapphira Cristál wears a wide Queen Charlotte-inspired royal blue dress and a tall blue wig. Dawn wears a nightwear-inspired navy blue outfit. Q has a lavender outfit with fringe and a large hat with fringe. Morphine Love Dion's royal purple look includes a hat with ostrich feathers.

== Reception ==
Stephen Daw ranked "Made You Look" number 22 in Billboard's list of the season's lip-syncs, writing: "The main crime of this lip sync was the choice of song. In an episode dedicated to funk music, why exactly were the top two queens of the week lip syncing to a once-viral Meghan Trainor song? ... Aside from the baffling choice of song, both Sapphira and Morphine did what needed to be done (shoutout to Sapphira's Charlie Brown-esque shuffle on the song’s chorus and Morphine’s hilarious claps after the song ended). But when we think of the 'Made You Look' lip sync, we can't help but think of the missed opportunity."
