= Megami (drag queen) =

American drag performer and cosplayer

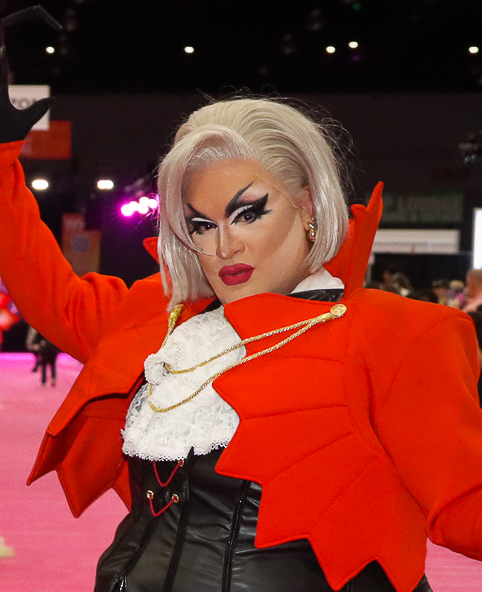
- Megami at RuPaul's DragCon LA, 2024
- Born: Jonathan Soto-Reyes; April 21, 1989 (age 37); Sunset Park, Brooklyn, New York City, New York, U.S.
- Other name: Megami D.Vil
- Occupation: Drag queen
- Television: RuPaul's Drag Race (season 16)

Megami, also known as Megami D.Vil, is the stage name of Jonathan Soto-Reyes (born April 21, 1989), an American drag queen and cosplayer best known for competing on season 16 of RuPaul's Drag Race. She was born and raised in Sunset Park, Brooklyn and Staten Island, and is currently based in Brooklyn.

== Career ==
Megami began performing in drag in 2016 when she won the cosplay lip-sync show GeekSync in New York. Her drag name is inspired by the Japanese word for goddess, Choujyu Sentai Liveman and by the video game Shin Megami Tensei: Digital Devil Saga.

Megami was cast on the sixteenth season of RuPaul's Drag Race, having applied to compete on the show five times. Megami first appeared in the season's second episode which premiered on January 12, 2024. Her talent show performance in this episode, in which she held up a banner stating "Protect Queer Art", subsequently became a meme in the Drag Race community; it was the subject of a parody by The Boulet Brothers' Dragula contestant Meatball at her Fat Slut drag show.

Megami won her first challenge in the fifth episode of the season as part of a girl group with Geneva Karr, Mhi'ya Iman Le'Paige and Nymphia Wind. Megami was eliminated in the seventh episode after underperforming in the season's Rusical challenge, a parody of The Sound of Music, and losing a lip-sync to Miley Cyrus' "Flowers" against Mhi'ya Iman Le'Paige. She placed tenth overall.

Megami returned in the fifteenth episode to compete in a lip sync tournament where she beat three previously eliminated contestants: Q to "What About" by Janet Jackson; Amanda Tori Meating to "The Shoop Shoop Song" by Cher; and Mhi'ya Iman Le'Paige to "We Got the Beat" by the Go-Go's. After narrowly beating Mhi'ya, she advanced to the finale of the LaLaPaRuza and performed to "Gonna Make You Sweat (Everybody Dance Now)" by C+C Music Factory against Morphine Love Dion. During their lip sync battle, Megami brought out googly eyes on her hand to make a puppet for the male vocalist portions of the track sung by Freedom Williams, scoring laughs with the judges. Ultimately, however, she ended up losing to Morphine, thus placing as the Season 16 LaLaPaRuza runner-up.

== Filmography ==
Year	Title	Genre	Role	Notes
2023	RuPaul's Drag Race	Web series	Herself	1 special episode; Meet the Queens
2024	RuPaul's Drag Race (season 16)	Television	Contestant	8 episodes
2024	RuPaul's Drag Race: Untucked	Television	Herself	Season 15, 6 episodes
2024	Whatcha Packin'	Web series	Herself	Guest; 1 episode
2024	Hey Qween!	Web series	Herself	Guest; 1 episode
2024	Bring Back My Girls			

== See also ==
- LGBTQ culture in New York City
- List of cosplayers
- List of LGBTQ people from New York City
