= See You Next Wednesday (RuPaul's Drag Race) =

- RuPaul's Drag Race episode
- Episode no.: Season 16; Episode 9
- Presented by: RuPaul
- Original air date: March 1, 2024

Guest appearance
- Kaia Gerber

Episode chronology
← Previous "Snatch Game"	Next → "Werq the World"

"See You Next Wednesday" is the ninth episode of the sixteenth season of the American television series RuPaul's Drag Race. It originally aired on March 1, 2024. The episode's main challenge tasks the contestants with designing and presenting "neo-goth" looks for the fashion show. Kaia Gerber is a guest judge. Q wins the main challenge. Plasma is eliminated from the competition after placing in the bottom two and losing a lip-sync contest against Mhi'ya Iman Le'Paige to the TikTok remix of "Bloody Mary" by Lady Gaga.

== Episode ==
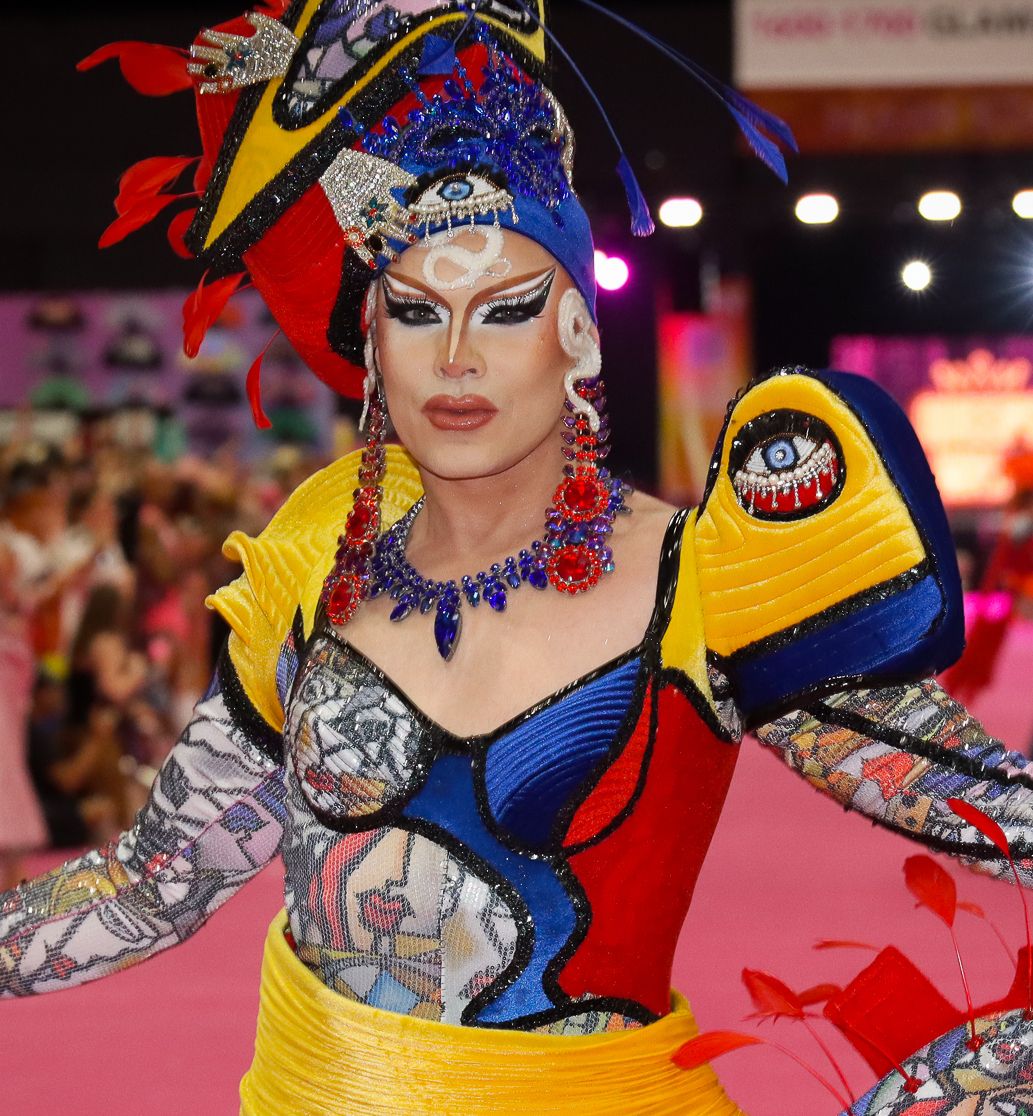
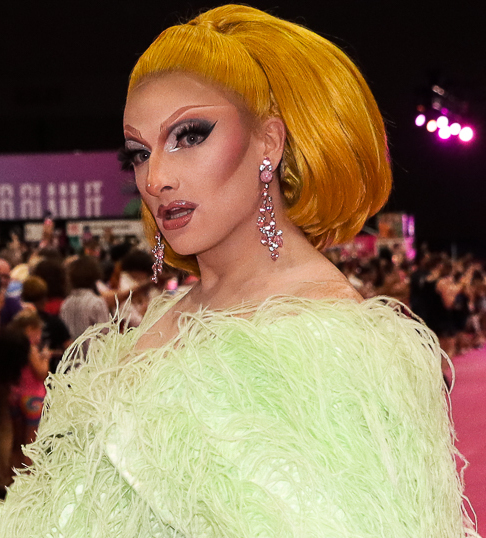
Q (left, pictured at RuPaul's DragCon LA in 2024) wins the episode's main challenge; Plasma (right, pictured at the same event) is eliminated from the competition.

The contestants return to the Werk Room after Xunami Muse's elimination on the previous episode. On a new day, RuPaul greets the group and reveals the mini-challenge, which tasks the contestants with performing spit-takes. Nymphia Wind wins the mini-challenge. RuPaul then reveals the main challenge, which tasks the contestants with designing and presenting "neo-goth" looks for the fashion show, using black, grey, and white fabrics. The contestants gather materials and start to create their outfits.

On elimination day, the contestants make final preparations in the Werk Room for the fashion show. Plasma talks about being queer in Texas. Morphine Love Dion discusses being non-binary and dating. On the main stage, RuPaul welcomes fellow judges Michelle Visage and Carson Kressley, as well as guest judge Kaia Gerber. RuPaul shares the runway category ("See You Next Wednesday"), then the fashion show commences. After the contestants present their looks, the judges deliver their critiques, deliberate, then share the results with the group. Dawn, Nymphia Wind, and Q receive positive critiques, and Q wins the challenge. Mhi'ya Iman Le'Paige, Morphine Love Dion, and Plasma receive negative critiques, and Morphine Love Dion is deemed safe. Mhi'ya Iman Le'Paige and Plasma place in the bottom and face off in a lip-sync contest to "Bloody Mary (Wednesday Dance TikTok Version)" by Lady Gaga. Mhi'ya Iman Le'Paige wins the lip-sync and Plasma is eliminated from the competition.

== Production and broadcast ==
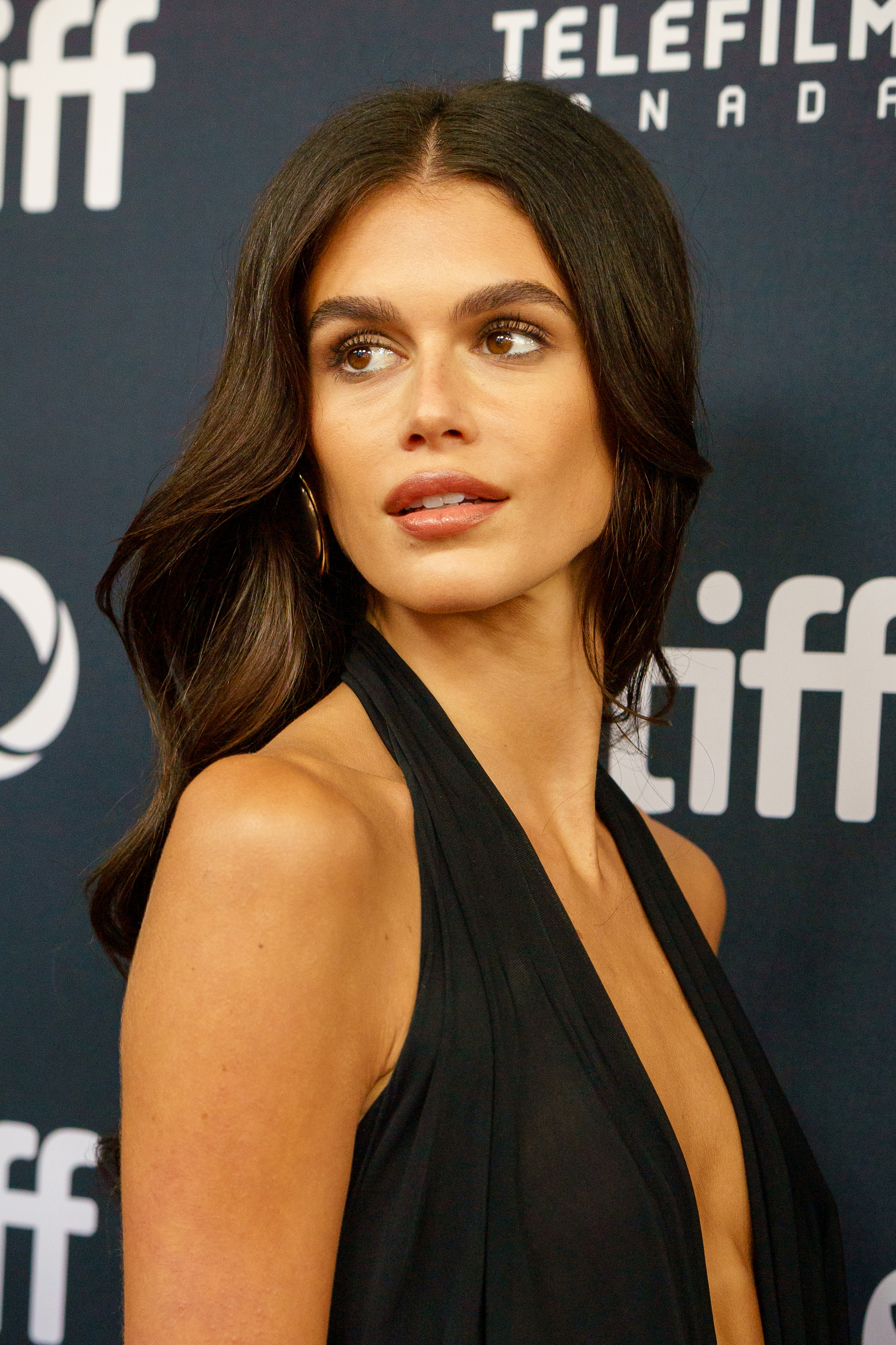
Kaia Gerber (pictured in 2024) is a guest judge.

The episode originally aired on March 1, 2024. It includes the season's third design challenge. Stephen Daw of Billboard said that during the lip-sync contest, "the bottom two gave their best renditions of Wednesday Addams' disaffected dancing. But in the end, the Queen of Flips managed to pull out another transformative performance, sending Plasma packing."

Plasma released a music video of "Bloody Mary".

=== Fashion ===
For the fashion show, Plane Jane's dominatrix-inspired outfit has many straps and chains. She wears tall black boots. Mhi'ya Iman Le'Paige wears multiple crows on her shoulders, as well as a long wig. Dawn has elf ears and headpieces. Inspired by Morticia Adams, Elvira, Mistress of the Dark, and Latin culture, Morphine Love Dion has a mermaid gown made of velvet. Plasma has a low-waisted pant and a shag coat. She has a long brown wig. Sapphira Cristál carries a flower bouquet. Nymphia Wind has a veil concealing her face. Q wears a one-piece "dress-coat" with ruffles and a large bow in the back.

== Reception ==
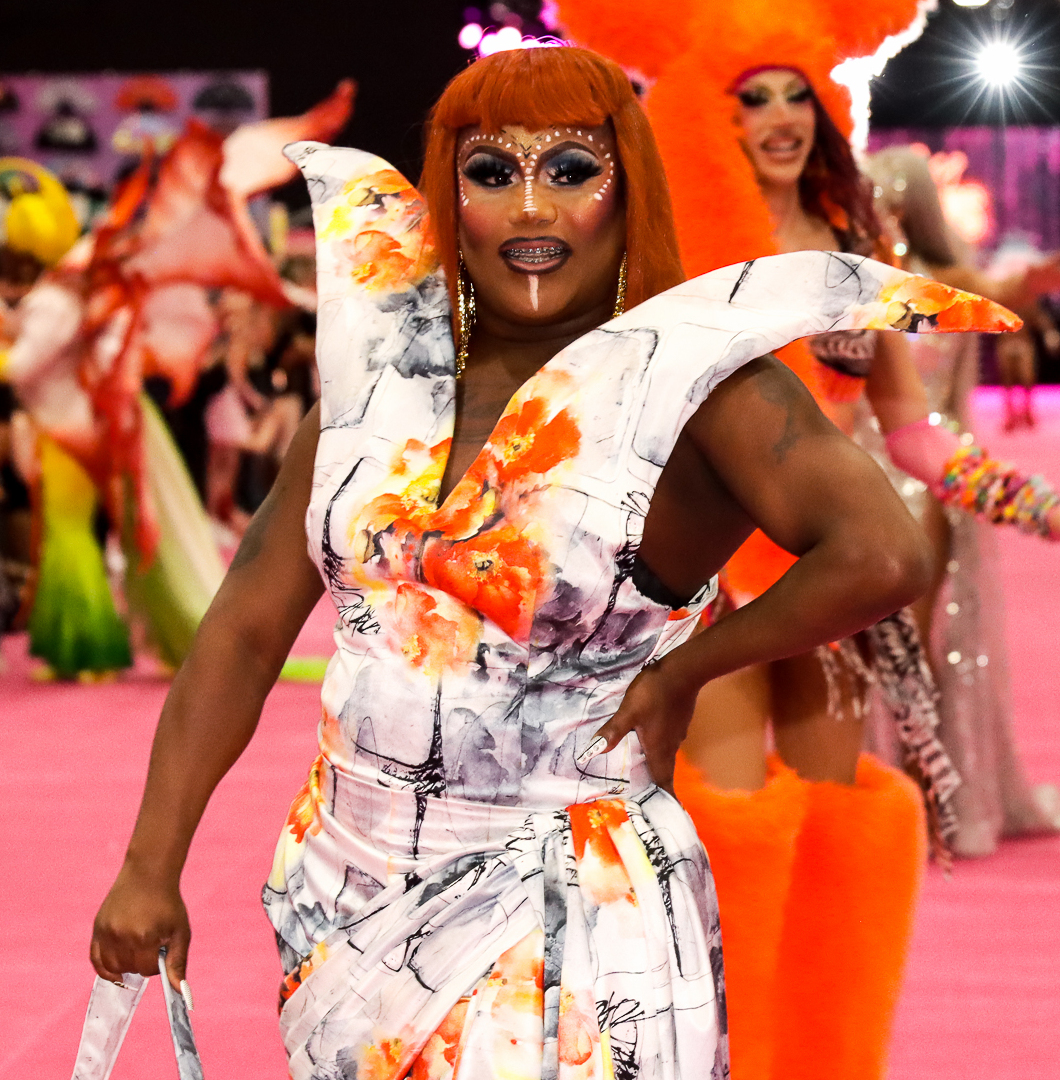
Mhi'ya Iman Le'Paige (pictured at RuPaul's DragCon LA in 2024) was praised for her lip-sync performance.

Jason P. Frank of Vulture rated the episode four out of five stars. Andrew J. Stillman of Pride.com said "fans were upset that [Q] took the win" and "were upset the win didn't go to" Nymphia Wind. Chris Compendio of the Philly Voice wrote about Sapphira Cristál's runways presentation: "Despite expressing doubts during the challenge, Sapphira showed off a gorgeous gown with a black and white mosaic design, made of a 'beautiful webbed sequin fabric.' Her jewelry, wig, makeup and bouquet all hit the aesthetic needs of a goth look — and her sarcastic and piercing glare at the judges showed her commitment to the character."

Andy Swift of TVLine said of the lip-sync contest: "Not being scared turned out to be Plasma's first mistake... and also her last. To say that Mhi'ya mopped the floor with her would be doing a disservice to mops. It was more like a full-blown evisceration, with Mhi'ya spinning, dipping and flipping circles around Plasma". Stephen Daw ranked the performance ninth in Billboard's list of the season's lip-sync contests and opined, "We're not crazy about the fact that the producers chose to use the sped-up, Alvin and the Chipmunks-esque version of this classic Gaga track, but that doesn't change the fact that Mhi'ya Iman Le'Paige absolutely destroyed this number." Daw wrote:

Between backflipping up the stage (in a full-length gown, mind you), a sequence of low kicks into a twirl into a flawless dip and her Sasha Velour-inspired rose petal reveal, Mhi'ya turned every beat of this track into a delicious circus of chaos — and it paid off. That's not to say Plasma did poorly; the theater queen clearly put in the work to try and earn her survival, and her performance was certainly entertaining (when you have a second, check out her own interpretation of the number post-elimination). But when stacked against a lip synching legend like Mhi'ya, "Bloody Mary" turned into a bloodbath.
