= RuPaul's Drag Race season 16 =

2024 season of RuPaul's Drag Race

RuPaul's Drag Race
- Season 16
- Promotional poster for season sixteen
- Hosted by: RuPaul
- Judges: RuPaul; Michelle Visage; Carson Kressley; Ross Mathews; Ts Madison
- No. of contestants: 14
- Winner: Nymphia Wind
- Runner-up: Sapphira Cristál
- Miss Congeniality: Sapphira Cristál; Xunami Muse
- Companion show: RuPaul's Drag Race: Untucked!
- No. of episodes: 16

Release
- Original network: MTV
- Original release: January 5 – April 19, 2024

Season chronology
- ← Previous; Season 15 Next → Season 17

The sixteenth season of RuPaul's Drag Race premiered on January 5, 2024. The reality competition series, broadcast on MTV in the United States, showcases fourteen drag queens competing for the title of "America's Next Drag Superstar" and a cash prize of $200,000.

This season introduced a LaLaPaRuZa Lip-Sync Smackdown competition for the eliminated queens that took place before the finale. Morphine Love Dion, who placed fifth in the main competition, won the smackdown and the title of Queen of She Done Already Done Had Herses.

The winner of season 16 was Nymphia Wind, the first ever East Asian winner, with Sapphira Cristál as the runner up and the series' first tied winner of Miss Congeniality, shared with Xunami Muse.

== Production ==
In August 2023, the competition series and its companion series, RuPaul's Drag Race: Untucked, were officially renewed and would remain on MTV. RuPaul's Drag Race All Stars was also renewed for a ninth season by Paramount+. In November, a teaser was released from MTV featuring RuPaul in various promos from past seasons. Sasha Colby, the winner of season fifteen, presented the Meet the Queens via the series official YouTube channel on December 6, 2023. The Meet the Queens video included an 8-minute clip from the season premiere, where the fourteen contestants entered the Werk Room set.

== Contestants ==
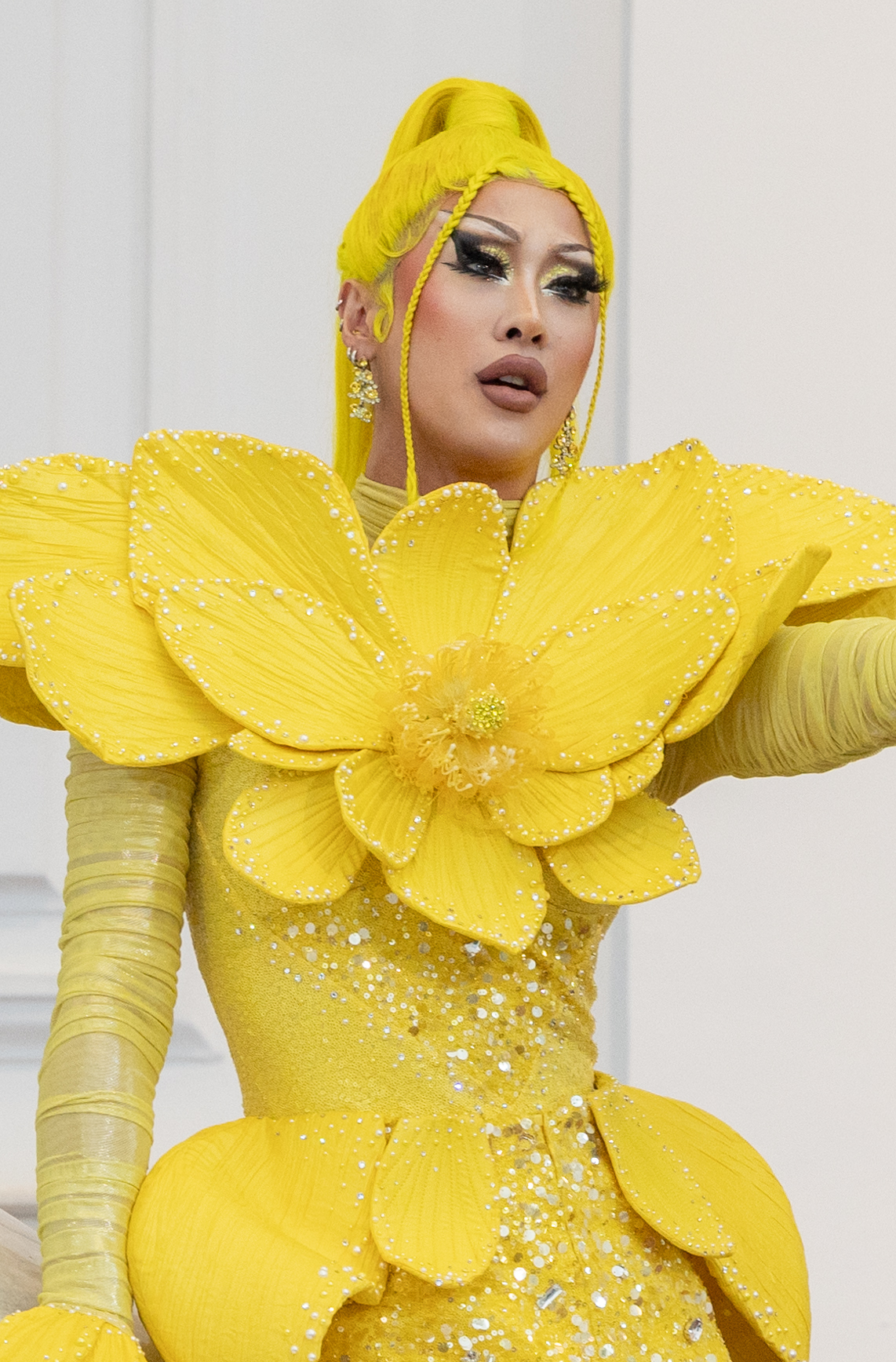
The winner, Nymphia Wind

Ages, names, and cities stated are at time of filming.

RuPaul's Drag Race season 16 contestants and their backgrounds
Contestant	Age	City	Outcome
Nymphia Wind	27	New York City, New York	Winner
Sapphira Cristál	34	Philadelphia, Pennsylvania	Runner-up (Note: Sapphira Cristál and Xunami Muse were voted Miss Congeniality by fellow contestants.)
Plane Jane	25	Boston, Massachusetts	3rd place
Q	26	Kansas City, Missouri	4th place
Morphine Love Dion	26	Miami, Florida	5th place (Note: Morphine was crowned Queen of She Done Already Done Had Herses after winning the Lip Sync LaLaPaRuza Smackdown.)
Dawn	25	New York City, New York	6th place
Mhi'ya Iman Le'Paige	34	Miami, Florida	7th place
Plasma (Note: Plasma LaRose is referred to as Plasma on the show.)	24	New York City, New York	8th place
Xunami Muse	34	New York City, New York	9th place
Megami (Note: Megami D.Vil is referred to as Megami on the show.)	33	New York City, New York	10th place
Geneva Karr	30	Brownsville, Texas	11th place
Amanda Tori Meating	26	Los Angeles, California	12th place
Mirage (Note: Mirage Amuro is referred to as Mirage on the show.)	29	Las Vegas, Nevada	13th place
Hershii LiqCour-Jeté	32	Los Angeles, California	14th place

== Contestant progress ==
Legend:

Nymphia Wind won RuPaul's Drag Race season 16.
Sapphira Cristál was the runner-up (RU).
Sapphira Cristál and Xunami Muse were voted Miss Congeniality (Miss C) by fellow contestants.
Amanda Tori Meating won the Golden Boot (GB) for having the worst look of the season after the show aired.
Morphine Love Dion was declared Queen of She Done Already Done Had Herses (SDADHH) after winning the final lip sync in the LaLaPaRuza Smackdown.
WIN indicates that the contestant won the challenge.
TOP2 indicates that the contestant was one of the two best performing in the challenge, but lost the lip sync to win it.
SAFE indicates that the contestant was declared safe by the judges.
IMM (Immunity) indicates that the contestant drank the immunity potion and was immune from elimination.
BTM (Bottom) indicates that the contestant was up for elimination.
ELIM (Eliminated) indicates that the contestant was eliminated.
LOSS indicates that the eliminated contestant participated in the LaLaPaRuza Smackdown, but lost one of the lip syncs.
Guest indicates that the contestant returned as a guest.

Contestants progress with placements in each episode
Contestant	Episode																
Contestant	1	2	3	4	5	6	7	8	9	10	11	12	13	14	15	16	
Nymphia Wind		SAFE	WIN	SAFE	WIN	SAFE	SAFE	SAFE	SAFE	IMM	SAFE	SAFE	SAFE	WIN	Guest	Winner	
Sapphira Cristál	WIN		SAFE	SAFE	SAFE	IMM	SAFE	SAFE	SAFE	WIN	WIN	WIN	BTM	SAFE	Guest	Runner-up	MC
Plane Jane		WIN	SAFE	SAFE	SAFE	SAFE	SAFE	WIN	SAFE	SAFE	SAFE	WIN	WIN	BTM	Guest	Eliminated	
Q	TOP2		SAFE	SAFE	BTM	WIN	SAFE	SAFE	WIN	SAFE	SAFE	SAFE	SAFE	ELIM	LOSS	Guest	
Morphine Love Dion	SAFE		SAFE	SAFE	SAFE	SAFE	SAFE	BTM	SAFE	TOP2	BTM	BTM	ELIM		SDADHH	Guest	
Dawn	SAFE		SAFE	SAFE	SAFE	SAFE	SAFE	SAFE	SAFE	SAFE	SAFE	ELIM			LOSS	Guest	
Mhi'ya Iman Le'Paige		SAFE	SAFE	SAFE	WIN	BTM	BTM	SAFE	BTM	SAFE	ELIM				LOSS	Guest	
Plasma		SAFE	SAFE	WIN	SAFE	SAFE	WIN	SAFE	ELIM						LOSS	Guest	
Xunami Muse	SAFE		SAFE	SAFE	SAFE	SAFE	SAFE	ELIM							LOSS	Miss C	
Megami		SAFE	SAFE	SAFE	WIN	SAFE	ELIM								TOP2	Guest	
Geneva Karr		TOP2	BTM	BTM	WIN	ELIM									LOSS	Guest	
Amanda Tori Meating	SAFE		SAFE	SAFE	ELIM										LOSS	GB	
Mirage	SAFE		SAFE	ELIM											LOSS	Guest	
Hershii LiqCour-Jeté		SAFE	ELIM												LOSS	Guest	

== Lip syncs ==
Legend:

The contestant won the lip sync to win the challenge.
The contestant was eliminated after their first time in the bottom.
The contestant was eliminated after their second time in the bottom.
The contestant was eliminated after their third time in the bottom.
The contestant was eliminated after their fourth time in the bottom.
The eliminated contestant won the first round of the Lip Sync LaLaPaRuZa Smackdown and advanced to the next round.
The eliminated contestant won the second round of the Lip Sync LaLaPaRuZa Smackdown and advanced to the next round.
The eliminated contestant won the third round of the Lip Sync LaLaPaRuZa Smackdown and advanced to the final round.
The eliminated contestant won the final round of the Lip Sync LaLaPaRuZa Smackdown and was declared Queen of She Done Already Done Had Herses.
The contestant won the Lip Sync for the Crown and was declared the winner of the season.

Episode	Top contestants			Song	Winner
1	Q	vs.	Sapphira Cristál	"Break My Soul" (Beyoncé)	Sapphira Cristál
2	Geneva Karr	vs.	Plane Jane	"Shower" (Becky G)	Plane Jane
Episode	Bottom contestants			Song	Eliminated
3	Geneva Karr	vs.	Hershii LiqCour-Jeté	"Maybe You're the Problem" (Ava Max)	Hershii LiqCour-Jeté
4	Geneva Karr	vs.	Mirage	"Dark Lady" (Cher)	Mirage
5	Amanda Tori Meating	vs.	Q	"Emergency" (Icona Pop)	Amanda Tori Meating
6	Geneva Karr	vs.	Mhi'ya Iman Le'Paige	"Control" (Janet Jackson)	Geneva Karr
7	Megami	vs.	Mhi'ya Iman Le'Paige	"Flowers" (Miley Cyrus)	Megami
8	Morphine Love Dion	vs.	Xunami Muse	"I Wanna Dance with Somebody (Who Loves Me)" (Whitney Houston)	Xunami Muse
9	Mhi'ya Iman Le'Paige	vs.	Plasma	"Bloody Mary (Wednesday Dance TikTok Version)" (Lady Gaga)	Plasma
Episode	Top contestants			Song	Winner
10	Morphine Love Dion	vs.	Sapphira Cristál	"Made You Look" (Meghan Trainor)	Sapphira Cristál
Episode	Bottom contestants			Song	Eliminated
11	Mhi'ya Iman Le'Paige	vs.	Morphine Love Dion	"Dim All the Lights" (Donna Summer)	Mhi'ya Iman Le'Paige
12	Dawn	vs.	Morphine Love Dion	"Body" (Megan Thee Stallion)	Dawn
13	Morphine Love Dion	vs.	Sapphira Cristál	"Miss Me More" (Kelsea Ballerini)	Morphine Love Dion
14	Plane Jane	vs.	Q	"Better Be Good to Me" (Tina Turner)	Q
Episode	Eliminated contestants			Song	Winner
15	Amanda Tori Meating	vs.	Dawn	"Damaged" (Danity Kane)	Amanda Tori Meating
15	Megami	vs.	Q	"What About" (Janet Jackson)	Megami
15	Geneva Karr	vs.	Morphine Love Dion	"Million Dollar Baby" (Ava Max)	Morphine Love Dion
15	Hershii LiqCour-Jeté	vs.	Mirage	"Alone 2.0" (Kim Petras, Nicki Minaj)	Mirage
15	Mhi'ya Iman Le'Paige vs. Plasma vs. Xunami Muse			"Milkshake" (Kelis)	Mhi'ya Iman Le'Paige
15	Amanda Tori Meating	vs.	Megami	"The Shoop Shoop Song" (Cher)	Megami
15	Mirage	vs.	Morphine Love Dion	"This Time I Know It's for Real" (Donna Summer)	Morphine Love Dion
15	Megami	vs.	Mhi'ya Iman Le'Paige	"We Got the Beat" (The Go-Go's)	Megami
15	Megami	vs.	Morphine Love Dion	"Gonna Make You Sweat (Everybody Dance Now)" (C+C Music Factory)	Morphine Love Dion
Episode	Finalists			Song	Winner
16	Nymphia Wind	vs.	Sapphira Cristál	"Padam Padam" (Kylie Minogue)	Nymphia Wind

== Guest judges ==
- Charlize Theron, actress and producer
- Becky G, singer and actress
- Isaac Mizrahi, fashion designer
- Sarah Michelle Gellar, actress
- Icona Pop, electropop musical duo
- Law Roach, retired stylist
- Adam Shankman, director, writer, producer, dancer and choreographer
- Kyra Sedgwick, actress
- Kaia Gerber, model
- Jamal Sims, choreographer
- Joel Kim Booster, actor and comedian
- Mayan Lopez, actress
- Kelsea Ballerini, singer
- Ronan Farrow, journalist

=== Special guests ===
Guests who appeared in episodes, but did not judge on the main stage.

Episodes 1–2

- Derrick Barry, contestant on season 8 and All Stars season 5
- Love Connie, drag performer and actor

Episode 6

- Charo, singer, actress, musician and comedian

Episode 7

- Melissa McCarthy, actress and comedian

Episode 8

- Chad Michaels, contestant on season 4 and winner of All Stars season 1

Episode 10

- Leland, music producer
- Freddy Scott, composer and actor

Episode 12

- Claudia "Norvina" Soare, president of Anastasia Beverly Hills

Episode 14

- Albert Sanchez, photographer
- Matt Rogers, comedian, podcaster and television host

Episode 16

- Sasha Colby, winner of season 15
- Malaysia Babydoll Foxx, Miss Congeniality of season 15
- Cassandra Peterson, actress

== Episodes ==
No. overall	No. in series	Title	Original release date
208	1	"Rate-A-Queen"	January 5, 2024
Seven new queens enter the workroom. They find out that this season will have a split premiere. For the first mini-challenge, the queens do a photoshoot on RuPaul's porch. Sapphira Cristál wins the mini-challenge. For the main challenge, the queens perform a talent in the MTV Spring Break Talent Show.: Amanda Tori Meating – Original song lip-sync; Dawn – Original song lip-sync; Mirage – Original song lip-sync; Morphine Love Dion – Lip-sync / Baile Folklorico; Q – Dance puppetry; Sapphira Cristál – Opera singing; Xunami Muse – Original song lip-sync; On the runway, category is RuVeal Yourself. The queens rank each other using Rate-A-Queen, where it is announced that Q and Sapphira Cristál are the top two queens of the week, and will lip-sync for the win. They lip-sync to "Break My Soul" by Beyoncé. After the lip-sync, Sapphira Cristál is announced as the winner of the challenge. RuPaul then announces that no one will be going home.: Guest Judge: Charlize Theron; Alternating Judge: Carson Kressley; Mini-Challenge: RuPaul's Porch Doorbell Camera Photoshoot; Mini-Challenge Winner: Sapphira Cristál; Mini-Challenge Prize: A $2,500 cash tip; Main Challenge: Perform a talent in the MTV Spring Break Talent Show; Runway Theme: RuVeal Yourself; Top Two: Q and Sapphira Cristál; Lip-Sync Song: "Break My Soul" by Beyoncé; Challenge Winner: Sapphira Cristál; Challenge Prize: A $5,000 cash tip and immunity from a future challenge
209	2	"Queen Choice Awards"	January 12, 2024
The remaining seven queens enter the workroom. For this week's mini-challenge, the queens do a photoshoot at RuPaul's SheMV. Nymphia Wind wins the mini-challenge. For the main challenge, the queens perform a talent in the Queen Choice Awards Talent Show.: Geneva Karr – Original song lip-sync; Hershii LiqCour-Jeté – Original song lip-sync; Megami – Sign holder / lip-sync; Mhi'ya Iman Le'Paige - Stunt / Flip lip-sync; Nymphia Wind - Cultural Dance; Plane Jane – Original song lip-sync; Plasma – Singing / Impressions; On the runway, category is Made You Look. The queens rank each other using Rate-A-Queen, where it is announced that Geneva Karr and Plane Jane are the top two queens of the week, and will lip-sync for the win. They lip-sync to "Shower" by Becky G. After the lip-sync, Plane Jane is announced as the winner of the challenge. RuPaul then reveals that no one will be going home.: Guest Judge: Becky G; Alternating Judge: Ross Mathews; Mini-Challenge: RuPaul's SheMV Hollywood Camera Photoshoot; Mini-Challenge Winner: Nymphia Wind; Mini-Challenge Prize: A $2,500 cash tip; Main Challenge: Perform a talent in the Queen Choice Awards Talent Show; Runway Theme: Made You Look; Top Two: Geneva Karr and Plane Jane; Lip-Sync Song: "Shower" by Becky G; Challenge Winner: Plane Jane; Challenge Prize: A $5,000 cash tip and immunity from a future challenge
210	3	"The Mother of All Balls"	January 19, 2024
At the beginning of the episode, RuPaul reveals that the previous two challenge winners, Plane Jane and Sapphira Cristál, will hold the power of the Immunity Potion. This can be used only once during the competition to give immunity to themselves or to another queen. For the main challenge, the queens create three looks for The Mother of All Balls: Mother Goose, Significant Mother, and Call Me Mother/Father Eleganza. After the runway, the queens rank each other using Rate-A-Queen for the last time. Nymphia Wind, Q and Sapphira Cristál receive positive critiques, with Nymphia Wind winning the challenge. Geneva Karr, Hershii LiqCour-Jeté and Mhi'ya Iman Le'Paige receive negative critiques, with Mhi'ya Iman Le'Paige being safe. Geneva Karr and Hershii LiqCour-Jeté lip-sync to "Maybe You're the Problem" by Ava Max. Geneva Karr wins the lip-sync and Hershii LiqCour-Jeté is the first queen to sashay away.: Guest Judge: Isaac Mizrahi; Alternating Judge: Carson Kressley; Main Challenge: The Mother of All Balls; Runway Themes: Mother Goose, Significant Mother, and Call Me Mother/Father Eleganza; Challenge Winner: Nymphia Wind; Challenge Prize: A $5,000 cash tip; Bottom Two: Geneva Karr and Hershii LiqCour-Jeté; Lip-Sync Song: "Maybe You're the Problem" by Ava Max; Eliminated: Hershii LiqCour-Jeté; Farewell Message: "WHIPLASH!!! ♡ HLJ"
211	4	"RDR Live!"	January 26, 2024
For this week's main challenge, the queens perform in a sketch comedy of RDR Live.: Host - Mirage; Queen Network News - Amanda Tori Meating, Dawn and Q; End of the World Countdown - Total Annihilation - Geneva Karr, Mhi'ya Iman LePaige, Morphine Love Dion and Xunami Muse; Thick and Long Deck Service - Megami and Plane Jane; Holidays with the Barbra Shop Quartet - Nymphia Wind, Plasma and Sapphira Cristál; On the runway, category is Everything Every-Cher All at Once. Plane Jane, Plasma and Q receive positive critiques, with Plasma winning the challenge. Geneva Karr, Mhi'ya Iman Le'Paige and Mirage receive negative critiques, with Mhi'ya Iman Le'Paige being safe. Geneva Karr and Mirage lip-sync to "Dark Lady" by Cher. Geneva Karr wins the lip-sync and Mirage sashays away.: Guest Judge: Sarah Michelle Gellar; Alternating Judge: Ross Mathews; Main Challenge: Perform in a sketch comedy of RDR Live; Runway Theme: Everything Every-Cher All at Once; Challenge Winner: Plasma; Challenge Prize: A $5,000 cash tip; Bottom Two: Geneva Karr and Mirage; Lip-Sync Song: "Dark Lady" by Cher; Eliminated: Mirage; Farewell Message: "Looks Like the Trash bag Lost 💋 LoL ♡ Mirage"
212	5	"Girl Groups"	February 2, 2024
For this week's mini-challenge, the queens take a cover photo for an original memoir. Sapphira Cristál wins the mini-challenge. For the main challenge, the queens write, record, and perform verses to one of RuPaul's songs.: Team Lovah Girlz - Amanda Tori Meating, Plane Jane, Plasma and Xunami Muse performing "Courage to Love"; Team Q.D.S.M. - Dawn, Morphine Love Dion, Q and Sapphira Cristál performing "Star Baby"; Team Thicc & Stick - Geneva Karr, Megami, Mhi'ya Iman Le'Paige and Nymphia Wind performing "A.S.M.R Lover"; On the runway, category is Faster Pussycat, Wig, Wig. Team Thicc & Stick is the winning team, with Geneva Karr, Megami, Mhi'ya Iman Le'Paige and Nymphia Wind all winning the challenge. Team Q.D.S.M. and Team Lovah Girlz are the losing teams. Amanda Tori Meating and Q receive the negative critiques, and are announced as the bottom two. They lip-sync to "Emergency" by Icona Pop. Q wins the lip-sync and Amanda Tori Meating sashays away.: Guest Judge: Icona Pop; Alternating Judge: Ts Madison; Mini-Challenge: Take a cover photo for an original memoir; Mini-Challenge Winner: Sapphira Cristál; Mini-Challenge Prize: An autographed copy of RuPaul's memoir The House of Hidden Meanings and a $2,000 cash tip; Main Challenge: Write, record, and perform verses to one of RuPaul's songs; Runway Theme: Faster Pussycat, Wig, Wig; Challenge Winners: Geneva Karr, Megami, Mhi'ya Iman Le'Paige and Nymphia Wind; Challenge Prize: A $5,000 cash tip, split between the winners; Bottom Two: Amanda Tori Meating and Q; Lip-Sync Song: "Emergency" by Icona Pop; Eliminated: Amanda Tori Meating; Farewell Message: "You are all Fugly SKANKS and I hate every last one of you bitches. Most of all Q. LMAO but actually ily♡ Have Fun cleaning this mirror you bitch. You better Fucking win so I can at least say the winner sent me to the house."
213	6	"Welcome to the DollHouse"	February 9, 2024
For this week's mini-challenge, the queens compete in a Flamenco Dance Contest. Xunami Muse wins the mini-challenge. For the main challenge, the queens design their own dolls based on their drag personas. On the Runway category is Welcome to the Dollhouse. Sapphira Cristál chooses to drink her immunity potion. Dawn, Plane Jane and Q receive positive critiques, with Q winning the challenge. Geneva Karr, Mhi'ya Iman Le'Paige and Plasma receive negative critiques, with Plasma being safe. Geneva Karr and Mhi'ya Iman Le'Paige lip-sync to "Control" by Janet Jackson. Mhi'ya Iman Le'Paige wins the lip-sync and Geneva Karr sashays away.: Guest Judge: Law Roach; Alternating Judge: Ts Madison; Mini-Challenge: Compete in a Flamenco Dance Contest; Mini-Challenge Winner: Xunami Muse; Mini-Challenge Prize: A trip to Spain, all expenses paid; Main Challenge: Design a doll based on your drag persona; Runway Theme: Welcome to the Dollhouse; Challenge Winner: Q; Challenge Prize: A $5,000 cash tip; Bottom Two: Geneva Karr and Mhi'ya Iman Le'Paige; Lip-Sync Song: "Control" by Janet Jackson; Eliminated: Geneva Karr; Farewell Message: "Malditas las odio. Love, GK. Vroom vroom!"
214	7	"The Sound of Rusic"	February 16, 2024
For this week's main challenge, the queens perform in The Sound of Rusic.: Dawn as Strudel Von Snapp; Megami as Schnitzel Von Snapp; Mhi'ya Iman Le'Paige as a Sister Sister; Morphine Love Dion as a Sister Fister; Nymphia Wind as Diesel Von Snapp; Plane Jane as a Baronette Eva; Plasma as Mariah Grande; Q as Baroness Braun; Sapphira Cristál as Mother Superior; Xunami Muse as a Baronette Magda; On the runway, category is I Can Buy Myself Flowers. Plasma, Q, and Sapphira Cristál receive positive critiques, with Plasma winning the challenge. Megami, Mhi'ya Iman Le'Paige, and Morphine Love Dion receive negative critiques, with Morphine Love Dion being safe. Megami and Mhi'ya Iman Le'Paige lip-sync to "Flowers" by Miley Cyrus. Mhi'ya Iman Le'Paige wins the lip-sync and Megami sashays away.: Guest Judge: Adam Shankman; Alternating Judge: Ross Mathews; Main Challenge: The Sound of Rusic; Runway Theme: I Can Buy Myself Flowers; Challenge Winner: Plasma; Challenge Prize: A $5,000 cash tip; Bottom Two: Megami and Mhi'ya Iman Le'Paige; Lip-Sync Song: "Flowers" by Miley Cyrus; Eliminated: Megami; Farewell Message: "Choose Chaos Be Badass Bitches NYC Girls, Take It Home! Heart Eyes ♡ -M"
215	8	"Snatch Game"	February 23, 2024
For this week's mini-challenge, the queens read each other to filth. Xunami Muse wins the mini-challenge. For the main challenge, the queens play the Snatch Game. Jesse Pattison and Laith Ashley star as the celebrity contestants. The cast consisted of: Dawn as Meghan McCain; Mhi'ya Iman Le'Paige as "Trina's cousin, $haquita"; Morphine Love Dion as Anna Delvey; Nymphia Wind as Jane Goodall; Plane Jane as Jelena Karleuša; Plasma as Patti LuPone; Q as Amelia Earhart; Sapphira Cristál as James Brown; Xunami Muse as "The Gold Tooth Fairy"; On the runway, category is Dancing Queen. Mhi'ya Iman Le'Paige, Plane Jane, and Sapphira Cristál receive positive critiques, with Plane Jane winning the challenge. Morphine Love Dion, Nymphia Wind, and Xunami Muse receive negative critiques, with Nymphia Wind being safe. Morphine Love Dion and Xunami Muse lip-sync to "I Wanna Dance With Somebody" by Whitney Houston. Morphine Love Dion wins the lip-sync and Xunami Muse sashays away.: Guest Judge: Kyra Sedgwick; Alternating Judge: Carson Kressley; Mini-Challenge: Reading is Fundamental; Mini-Challenge Winner: Xunami Muse; Mini-Challenge Prize: A $2,500 cash tip; Main Challenge: Snatch Game; Runway Theme: Dancing Queen; Challenge Winner: Plane Jane; Challenge Prize: A $5,000 cash tip; Bottom Two: Morphine Love Dion and Xunami Muse; Lip-Sync Song: "I Wanna Dance with Somebody (Who Loves Me)" by Whitney Houston; Eliminated: Xunami Muse; Farewell Message: "You know what... NOT me leaving this early!!! LMAO Ladies, just serve mad C*** LOVE u all ♡ -Xunami MUSE"
216	9	"See You Next Wednesday"	March 1, 2024
For this week's mini-challenge, the queens perform a spit-take. Nymphia Wind wins the mini-challenge. For the main challenge, the queens create a neo-goth outfit made from unconventional materials. On the runway, category is See You Next Wednesday. Dawn, Nymphia Wind, Q and Sapphira Cristál receive positive critiques, with Q winning the challenge. Mhi'ya Iman Le'Paige, Morphine Love Dion, and Plasma receive negative critiques, with Morphine Love Dion being safe. Mhi'ya Iman Le'Paige and Plasma lip-sync to "Bloody Mary (Wednesday Dance TikTok Version)" by Lady Gaga. Mhi'ya Iman Le'Paige wins the lip-sync and Plasma sashays away.: Guest Judge: Kaia Gerber; Alternating Judge: Carson Kressley; Mini-Challenge: Perform a spit-take; Mini-Challenge Winner: Nymphia Wind; Mini-Challenge Prize: A $2,500 cash tip; Main Challenge: Create a neo-goth outfit made from unconventional materials; Runway Theme: See You Next Wednesday; Challenge Winner: Q; Challenge Prize: A $5,000 cash tip; Bottom Two: Mhi'ya Iman LePaige and Plasma; Lip-Sync Song: "Bloody Mary (Wednesday Dance TikTok Version)" by Lady Gaga; Eliminated: Plasma; Farewell Message: "'Wow!' –Morphine. Thank you all for the love UGLY UGLY UGLY! xoxo –Plazzy"
217	10	"Werq the World"	March 8, 2024
For this week's main challenge, the queens write, record, and perform verses to "Power." On the runway, category is True Colors. Plane Jane chooses to gift her immunity potion to Nymphia Wind. Dawn, Mhi'ya Iman Le'Paige, Morphine Love Dion and Sapphira Cristal receive positive critiques. Plane Jane and Q receive negative critiques. It is announced that Morphine Love Dion and Sapphira Cristál are the top two queens of the week, and will lip-sync for the win. They lip-sync to "Made You Look" by Meghan Trainor. After the lip-sync, Sapphira Cristál is announced as the winner of the challenge. RuPaul then announces that no one is going home.: Guest Judge: Jamal Sims; Alternating Judge: Ross Mathews; Main Challenge: Write, record, and perform verses to "Power"; Runway Theme: True Colors; Top Two: Morphine Love Dion and Sapphira Cristál; Lip-sync Song: "Made You Look" by Meghan Trainor.; Challenge Winner: Sapphira Cristál; Challenge Prize: A $5,000 cash tip
218	11	"Corporate Queens"	March 15, 2024
For this week's mini-challenge, the queens vote in rounds to assign superlatives to their fellow queens. Sapphira Cristál wins the mini-challenge. For the main challenge, the queens team up to write and deliver drag awareness employee seminars.: Do You Know Your Drag Herstory? - Plane Jane and Q; Drag in the Workplace - Dawn and Mhi'ya Iman Le'Paige; Are You a Drag Queen? You Might Be Surprised - Morphine Love Dion, Nymphia Wind and Sapphira Cristál; On the runway, category is Flashback: DragCon 1980. Nymphia Wind, Plane Jane, Q and Sapphira Cristál receive positive critiques, with Sapphira Cristál winning the challenge. Dawn, Mhi'ya Iman Le'Paige and Morphine Love Dion receive negative critiques, with Dawn being safe. Mhi'ya Iman Le'Paige and Morphine Love Dion lip-sync to "Dim All the Lights" by Donna Summer. Morphine Love Dion wins the lip-sync and Mhi'ya Iman Le'Paige sashays away.: Guest Judge: Joel Kim Booster; Alternating Judge: Ross Mathews; Mini-Challenge: Spill the T; Mini-Challenge Winner: Sapphira Cristál; Mini-Challenge Prize: A $3,400 cash tip; Main Challenge: In teams, write and deliver a drag awareness employee seminar; Runway Theme: Flashback: DragCon 1980; Challenge Winner: Sapphira Cristál; Challenge Prize: A $5,000 cash tip; Bottom Two: Mhi'ya Iman LePaige and Morphine Love Dion; Lip-Sync Song: "Dim All the Lights" by Donna Summer; Eliminated: Mhi'ya Iman LePaige; Farewell Message: "It was fun I love you all Season 16! Morphine bring it home #305 *Queen of Flipss* #Mhi'ya"
219	12	"Bathroom Hunties"	March 22, 2024
For this week's mini-challenge, the queens imprint a full face of makeup onto a T-shirt using only their face. Plane Jane wins the mini-challenge. For the main challenge, the queens pair up to design and create their own bathroom.: Bootylickers Speakeasy - Plane Jane and Sapphira Cristál; F.ART Museum - Dawn and Nymphia Wind; Naughty Potty - Morphine Love Dion and Q; On the runway, category is Chain Reaction. Plane Jane and Sapphira Cristál receive positive critiques, with both queens winning the challenge. Dawn, Morphine Love Dion, Nymphia Wind and Q receive negative critiques, with Nymphia Wind and Q being safe. Dawn and Morphine Love Dion lip-sync to "Body" by Megan Thee Stallion. Morphine Love Dion wins the lip-sync and Dawn sashays away.: Guest Judge: Mayan Lopez; Alternating Judge: Carson Kressley; Mini-Challenge: Imprint a full face of makeup onto a T-shirt using only your face; Mini-Challenge Winner: Plane Jane; Mini-Challenge Prize: $5,000 worth of makeup products; Main Challenge: In pairs, design and create your own bathroom; Runway Theme: Chain Reaction; Challenge Winners: Plane Jane and Sapphira Cristál; Challenge Prize: A $5,000 cash tip, split between the winners; Bottom Two: Dawn and Morphine Love Dion; Lip-Sync Song: "Body" by Megan Thee Stallion; Eliminated: Dawn; Farewell Message: BYE ♡ xoxo Dawn
220	13	"Drag Race Vegas Live! Makeovers"	March 29, 2024
For this week's main challenge, the queens makeover Pit Crew dancer's from RuPaul's Drag Race Live!. On the runway, category is Drag Family Resemblance. Nymphia Wind, Plane Jane and Q receive positive critiques, with Plane Jane winning the challenge. Morphine Love Dion and Sapphira Cristál receive negative critiques, and are announced as the bottom two. They lip-sync to "Miss Me More" by Kelsea Ballerini. Sapphira Cristál wins the lip-sync and Morphine Love Dion sashays away.: Guest Judge: Kelsea Ballerini; Alternating Judge: Ts Madison; Main Challenge: Makeover Pit Crew dancer's from RuPaul's Drag Race Live!; Runway Theme: Drag Family Resemblance; Challenge Winner: Plane Jane; Challenge Prize: A $5,000 cash tip each for Plane Jane and her makeover partner; Bottom Two: Morphine Love Dion and Sapphira Cristál; Lip-Sync Song: "Miss Me More" by Kelsea Ballerini; Eliminated: Morphine Love Dion; Farewell Message: "It's gonna be sooo boring without me. I'm rooting for all of you my top 4 queens here slaying and I can't wait to see you soon ♡ Morphine Love Dion 💋"
221	14	"Booked and Blessed"	April 5, 2024
For this week's mini-challenge, the queens lip-sync to RuPaul's song "Kitty Girl" underwater. Sapphira Cristál wins the mini-challenge. For the main challenge, the queens write and promote a concept for a memoir.: Nymphia Wind - Breaking Wind - The Art of Letting Go; Plane Jane - Plane Crash! How I Walked Away from Disaster; Q - Alphabet Soup - Savor Every Bite; Sapphira Cristál - Slue Foot - Embracing All of Me; On the runway, category is Fandango. Nymphia Wind and Sapphira Cristál receive positive critiques, with Nymphia Wind winning the challenge. Plane Jane and Q receive negative critiques, and are announced as the bottom two. They lip-sync to "Better Be Good to Me" by Tina Turner. Plane Jane wins the lip-sync and Q sashays away.: Guest Judge: Ronan Farrow; Alternating Judge: Ts Madison; Mini-Challenge: Lip-sync to RuPaul's song "Kitty Girl" underwater; Mini-Challenge Winner: Sapphira Cristál; Mini-Challenge Prize: A trip for two to The Alamar Resort and Mantamar Beach Club in Puerto Vallarta, Mexico; Main Challenge: Write and promote a concept for a memoir; Runway Theme: Fandango; Challenge Winner: Nymphia Wind; Challenge Prize: A $5,000 cash tip; Bottom Two: Plane Jane and Q; Lip-Sync Song: "Better Be Good to Me" by Tina Turner; Eliminated: Q; Farewell Message: "Not Gonna Lie, This one hurts... But I love you all so much! you're gonna kill it ♡ FROM NOW ON THERE'S ONLY ONE LETTER OF THE ALPHABET -Q"
222	15	"Lip Sync LaLaPaRuza Smackdown – Reunited"	April 12, 2024
This week, the eliminated queens participate in a Lip-Sync LaLaPaRuza Smackdown. In the first round, Dawn gets picked first and chooses Amanda Tori Meating to lip-sync against. Amanda Tori Meating then chooses "Damaged" by Danity Kane. Amanda Tori Meating wins the lip-sync and Dawn loses. Q is next to be picked and chooses Megami to lip-sync against. Megami then chooses "What About" by Janet Jackson. Megami wins the lip-sync and Q loses. Morphine Love Dion is next to be picked and chooses Geneva Karr to lip-sync against. Geneva Karr then chooses "Million Dollar Baby" by Ava Max. Morphine Love Dion wins the lip-sync and Geneva Karr loses. Mirage is next to be picked and chooses Hershii LiqCour-Jeté to lip-sync against. Hershii LiqCour-Jeté then chooses "Alone 2.0" by Kim Petras and Nicki Minaj. Mirage wins the lip-sync and Hershii LiqCour-Jeté loses. The final three queens, Mhi'ya Iman Le'Paige, Plasma and Xunami Muse, lip-sync to "Milkshake" by Kelis. Mhi'ya Iman Le'Paige wins the lip-sync and Plasma and Xunami Muse lose. In the second round, it is announced that Mhi'ya Iman Le'Paige will advance directly to the third round. Amanda Tori Meating gets picked first and chooses Megami to lip-sync against. Megami then chooses "The Shoop Shoop Song" by Cher. Megami wins the lip-sync and Amanda Tori Meating loses. The final two queens, Mirage and Morphine Love Dion, lip-sync to "This Time I Know It's for Real" by Donna Summer. Morphine Love Dion wins the lip-sync and Mirage loses. In the third round, it is announced that only two queens will lip-sync. Megami gets picked and chooses Mhi'ya Iman Le'Paige to lip-sync against, meaning Morphine Love Dion will advance directly to the final round. Megami and Mhi'ya Iman Le'Paige lip-sync to "We Got the Beat" by The Go-Go's. Megami wins the lip-sync and Mhi'ya Iman Le'Paige loses. In the final round, Megami and Morphine Love Dion lip-sync to "Gonna Make You Sweat (Everybody Dance Now)" by C+C Music Factory. Morphine Love Dion wins the lip-sync and earns the title of "Queen of She Done Already Done Had Herses".: Alternating Judge: Ts Madison; Main Challenge: Participate in a Lip Sync LaLaPaRuZa Smackdown; Lip-Sync Songs: "Damaged" by Danity Kane, "What About" by Janet Jackson, "Million Dollar Baby" by Ava Max, "Alone 2.0" by Kim Petras and Nicki Minaj, "Milkshake" by Kelis, "The Shoop Shoop Song" by Cher, "This Time I Know It's for Real" by Donna Summer, "We Got the Beat" by The Go-Go's and "Gonna Make You Sweat (Everybody Dance Now)" by C+C Music Factory; Round 1 Lip-Sync Winners: Amanda Tori Meating, Megami, Mhi'ya Iman Le'Paige, Mirage and Morphine Love Dion; Round 2 Lip-Sync Winners: Megami and Morphine Love Dion (Mhi'ya Iman Le'Paige advanced directly to round 3); Round 3 Lip-Sync Winner: Megami (Morphine Love Dion advanced directly to the final round); Queen of She Done Already Done Had Herses: Morphine Love Dion
223	16	"Grand Finale"	April 19, 2024
All the queens return for the grand finale. The final three queens then perform to a song that was written specifically for them. Nymphia Wind lip-syncs to "Queen of Wind", Plane Jane lip-syncs to "Bodysuit" and Sapphira Cristál lip-syncs to "DANCE!". After their performances, RuPaul tells the queens that only two queens will be advancing to the final lip-sync of the season. It is announced that the final two queens are Nymphia Wind and Sapphira Cristál, meaning Plane Jane is eliminated. It is then announced that Sapphira Cristál and Xunami Muse are this season's Miss Congeniality. Nymphia Wind and Sapphira Cristál lip-sync to "Padam Padam" by Kylie Minogue. It is announced that Nymphia Wind is the winner, leaving Sapphira Cristál as the runner-up.: Final Three: Nymphia Wind, Plane Jane and Sapphira Cristál; Eliminated: Plane Jane; Miss Congeniality: Sapphira Cristál and Xunami Muse; Final Two: Nymphia Wind and Sapphira Cristál; Lip-Sync Song: "Padam Padam" by Kylie Minogue; Runner-up: Sapphira Cristál; Winner of RuPaul's Drag Race Season Sixteen: Nymphia Wind

== Ratings ==
Viewership and ratings per episode of RuPaul's Drag Race season 16
No.	Title	Air date	Rating (18–49)	Viewers (millions)	Ref.
1	"Rate-A-Queen"	January 5, 2024	0.26	0.708	
2	"Queen Choice Awards"	January 12, 2024	0.21	0.592	
3	"The Mother of All Balls"	January 19, 2024	0.21	0.589	
4	"RDR Live!"	January 26, 2024	0.24	0.598	
5	"Girl Groups"	February 2, 2024	0.16	0.470	
6	"Welcome to the Doll House"	February 9, 2024	0.19	0.482	
7	"The Sound of Rusic"	February 16, 2024	0.17	0.519	
8	"Snatch Game"	February 23, 2024	0.21	0.569	
9	"See You Next Wednesday"	March 1, 2024	0.29	0.632	
10	"Werq the World"	March 8, 2024	0.23	0.562	
11	"Corporate Queens"	March 15, 2024	0.19	0.516	
12	"Bathroom Hunties"	March 22, 2024	0.21	0.516	
13	"Drag Race Vegas Live! Makeovers"	March 29, 2024	0.22	0.567	
14	"Booked & Blessed"	April 5, 2024	0.21	0.498	
15	"Lip Sync LaLaPaRuza Smackdown – Reunited"	April 12, 2024	0.24	0.580	
16	"Grand Finale"	April 19, 2024	0.31	0.708	
