= Plane Jane =

American drag performer (born 1998)

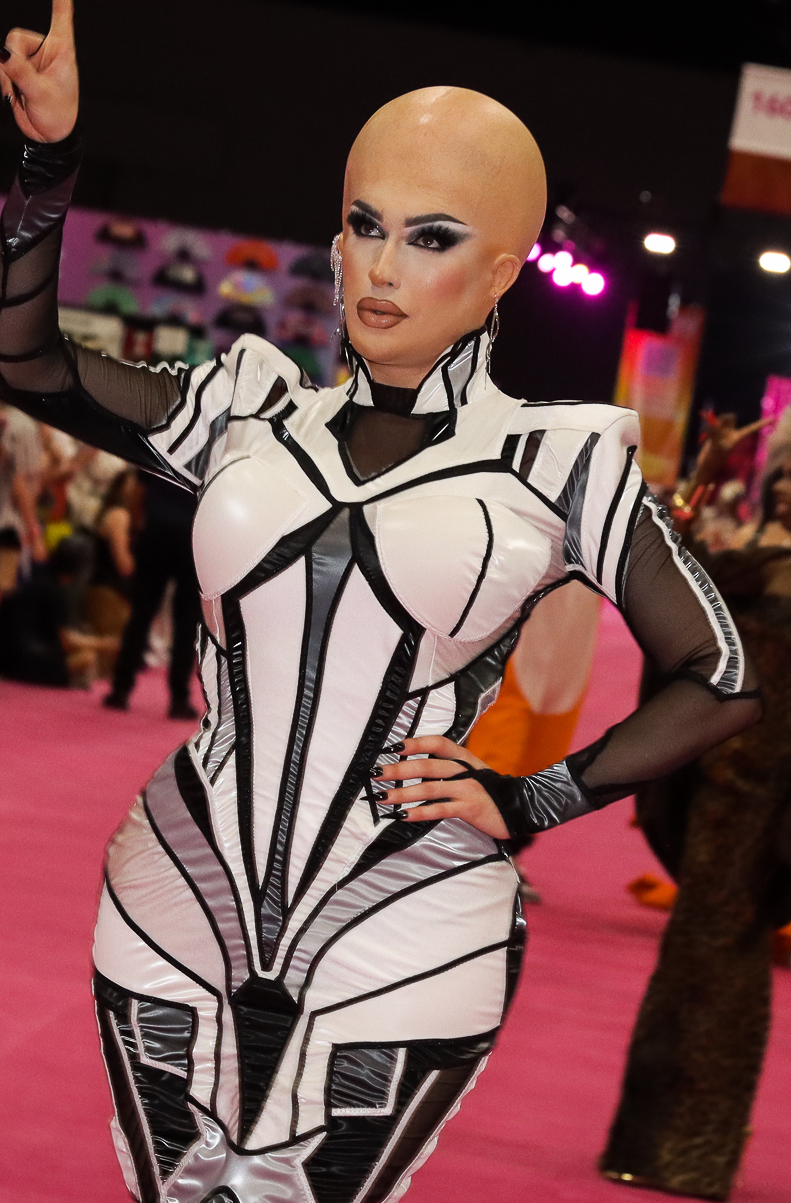
- Plane Jane at DragCon 2024
- Born: Andrew Vladimir Dunayevskiy; February 4, 1998 (age 28)
- Occupation: Drag queen
- Television: RuPaul's Drag Race (season 16)
- Website: planejanedrag.com

Plane Jane (born February 4, 1998) is the stage name of Andrew Vladimir Dunayevskiy, an American drag performer who competed on RuPaul's Drag Race season 16.

== Early life ==
Dunayevskiy is the child of Russian Jewish immigrants. Dunayevskiy was raised in Newton, Massachusetts, and was a competitive ballroom dancer at a young age.

== Career ==
Plane Jane is a drag performer. In Boston, she has been the resident host of a drag bingo series.

Plane Jane competed on season 16 of RuPaul's Drag Race, placing third overall. Some media outlets said she seemed to occupy, and even embrace, the villain role. On the second episode, she won the talent show challenge with a performance of her debut single "Burger Finger", and earned immunity from a future elimination after beating Geneva Karr in a lip-sync contest. During the initial episodes of the season, Plane Jane was quickly seen as someone who offered unsolicited opinions and gave semi-condescending critiques in an effort to "assist" fellow contestants. This was evidenced by the interactions between herself and "underdog" queen Amanda Tori Meating (both on the show and online, primarily via Twitter).

== Personal life ==
Dunayevskiy is based in Boston.

== Filmography ==
=== Television ===
Year	Title	Role	Notes	Ref.
2024	RuPaul's Drag Race (season 16)	Contestant	3rd place; 16 episodes	
2024	RuPaul's Drag Race: Untucked (season 15)	Herself	14 episodes	
2025	RuPaul's Drag Race (season 17)	Herself	Special guest; Episode: "The Villains Roast"	
2026	House of Villains (season 3)	Contestant	10th place; 5 episodes	
2026	Project Runway (season 22)	Contestant	17th place; 2 episodes	

=== Web series ===
- YouTube series: Life's A Drag (2023)
- Bring Back My Girls

== Discography ==
=== Singles ===
==== As lead artist ====
Year	Title	Writer(s)	Producer(s)	Ref(s)
2024	"Burger Finger"	Andrew Dunayevskiy, Daniel Allen	Daniel Allen	
