= Spit-take =

Comic reaction

A spit-take is a comedic technique or reaction in which someone spits a drink, or sometimes food, out of their mouth as a reaction to a surprising or funny statement.

An essential part of the spit-take is comedic timing. The person performing the spit-take usually starts drinking or eating right before the punchline is delivered. When the joke hits, the person accentuates the effect by pretending that the alleged humor/shock is so overwhelming and irresistible, that they cannot even control the urge of laughter/scream before swallowing, and therefore has to reflexively spit out the mouthful of content to prevent choking.

In performance, a spit-take represents a reaction of shock, while in real life it is typically one of mirth.

"Spit take" was included in the Oxford Dictionaries (not to be confused with the Oxford English Dictionary) in a 2014 update. It was also added to the Merriam-Webster dictionary in an April 2019 update.

== Etymology ==
The spit-take, as a comedic technique, is a noun, but it shows up in media in some different forms. It can be seen used figuratively in a description of a satire work, Popstar: Never Stop Never Stopping: "[it] is a spit-take on the world of contemporary pop music and celebrity ..."

It can also be used as a verb: "On the morning of May 12, LinkedIn ... emailed scores of my contacts and told them I'm a professional racist. It was one of those updates that LinkedIn regularly sends its users, algorithmically assembled missives about their connections' appearances in the media. ... This surely caused a few of my professional acquaintances to spit-take." — Will Johnson, Slate, 24 May 2016.

The conjugation of spit-take as a verb is not clearly defined. There is evidence of both "spit-taked" and "spit took". Constructions like "made me spit-take" are convenient for avoiding this issue all together. Beyond that, leaving the phrase as a noun, like "do a spit-take", continues to be the most common usage.

== Origin ==
Originally called a spit gag, the word itself most likely dates to the early 20th century, but it mostly existed in showbiz vernacular.

Danny Thomas, commonly associated with the spit-take, is credited as the comedian who made it famous. It is sometimes referred to as the "Danny Thomas spit take." He perfected it during the 11 seasons of The Danny Thomas Show (1953-1964). However, Desi Arnaz did it a year earlier in an I Love Lucy (1951-1957) episode. Also a year before Thomas, a spit-take was performed by David Bruce in a 1952 episode of Beulah (1950-1953), "The New Arrival." It has been used in several sitcoms since.

The "spit" part of the term is clear, but the "take" part is a little less obvious. In this context, the word "take" is used in the sense of a visible response or reaction (as to something unexpected). It is similar in construction to the phrase "double-take".
