= Mhi'ya Iman Le'Paige =

American drag performer

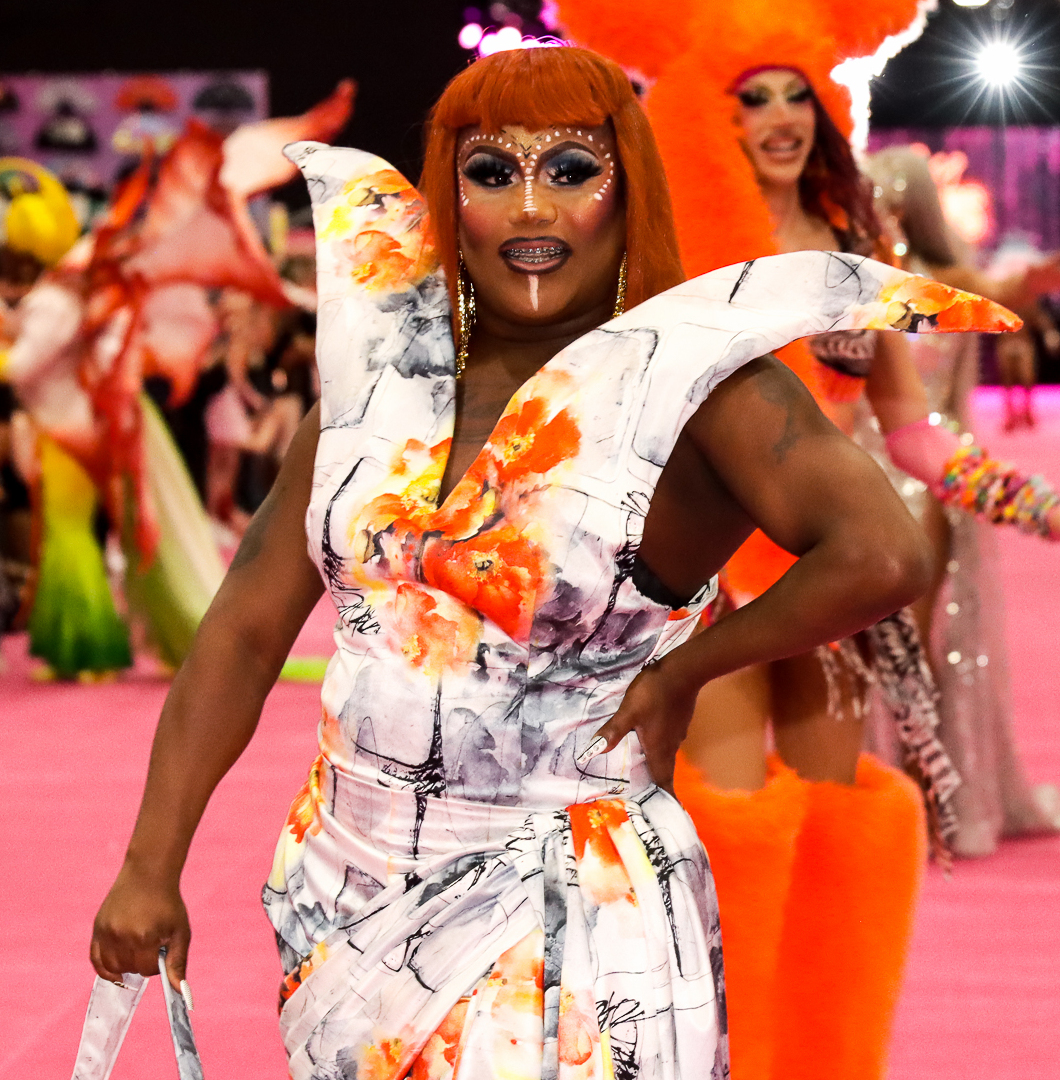
- Le'Paige at RuPaul's DragCon LA, 2024
- Born: 1988 or 1989 (age 36–37)
- Occupation: Drag queen
- Television: RuPaul's Drag Race (season 16)
- Website: queenofflipss.com

Mhi'ya Iman Le'Paige (born 1988/1989) is an American drag performer who competed on season 16 of RuPaul's Drag Race.

== Career ==
Mhi'ya Iman Le'Paige competed on season 16 of RuPaul's Drag Race. Mhi'ya won the Girl Group challenge on episode 5 with Geneva Karr, Megami and Nymphia Wind. For the Snatch Game challenge, she impersonated Trina's fictional cousin Shaquita. Mhi'ya Iman Le'Paige is noted by Drag Race fans for her lip-sync and dancing skills and eliminated Geneva Karr, Megami and Plasma from the competition. Mhi'ya eventually met her match in Morphine Love Dion and lost a lipsync against her on episode 11, making her place 7th overall.

== Personal life ==
Mhi'ya Iman Le'Paige is of Haitian descent. She lived in Miami's Liberty City neighborhood.

She is a "drag daughter" of season 7 contestant Kennedy Davenport.

== Filmography ==
- RuPaul's Drag Race (season 16)
- RuPaul's Drag Race: Untucked
- Bring Back My Girls

== See also ==
- List of people from Los Angeles
- List of people from Miami
