= Amanda Tori Meating =

American drag performer

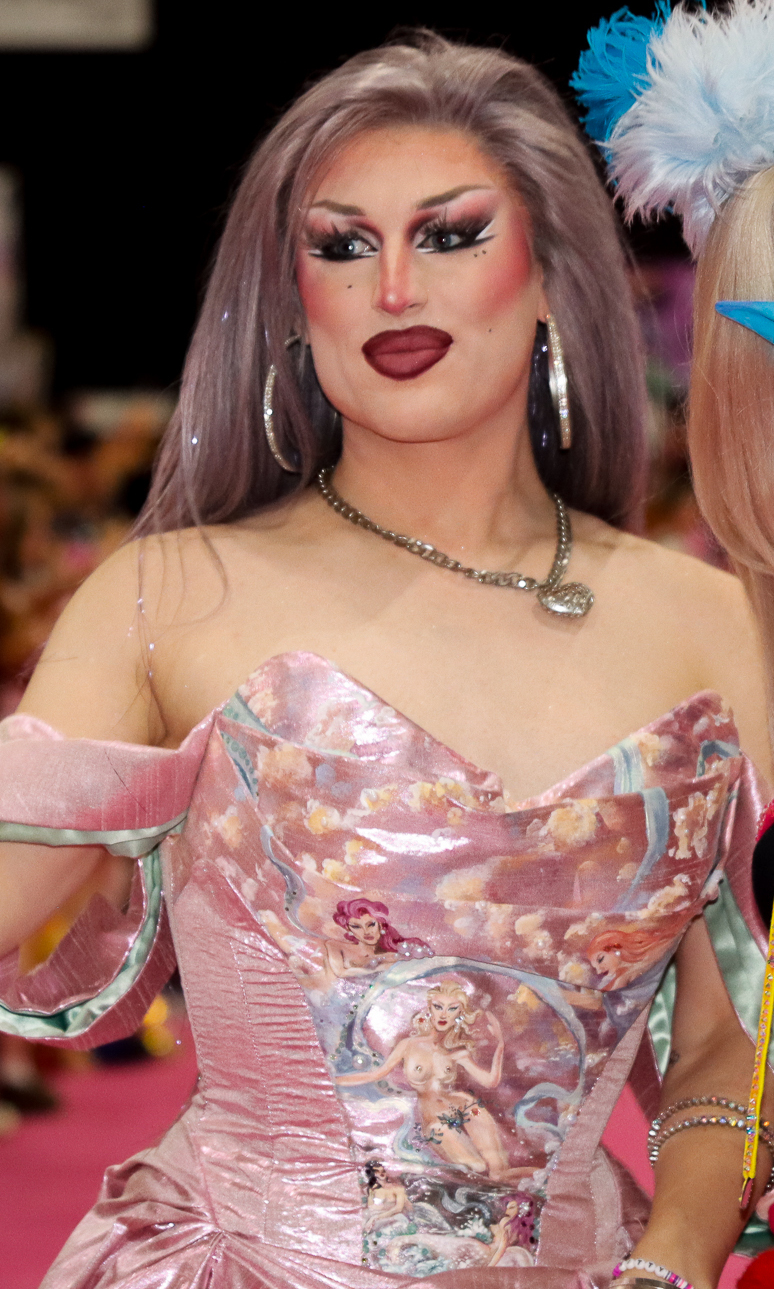
- Amanda Tori Meating at RuPaul's DragCon LA, 2024
- Other name: Amanda Philipps
- Education: Wright State University (BFA)
- Occupation: Drag queen
- Television: RuPaul's Drag Race (season 16)

Amanda Tori Meating is the stage name of Amanda Philipps, an American drag performer, theatrical actor, and wig stylist who competed on season 16 of RuPaul's Drag Race.

== Education ==
Amanda Philipps graduated from the Stivers School for the Arts in 2014, and earned a degree in musical theatre from Wright State University in 2018.

== Career ==
Philipps portrayed Angel in the national tour of Kinky Boots, and was also cast in Human Race Theatre Company's production of Torch Song Trilogy, Wright State's production of Angels in America: Millennium Approaches, and Dayton Theatre Guild's production of Lost in Yonkers. She is also a wig stylist, and has styled wigs for fellow queens such as Kerri and Sasha Colby. The gender euphoria experienced during her time spent as a part of Kinky Boots inspired her to start drag, and she began performing in the West Village, Manhattan, in 2020.

Philipps competed as Amanda Tori Meating on season 16 of RuPaul's Drag Race, which debuted on January 5, 2024. Alongside the season premiere, she released her original song "My Kitty", which she performed as part of the first episode's talent show. She began watching Drag Race at age 19, and was inspired by contestants such as Willam, Bob the Drag Queen, Bianca Del Rio, Adore Delano, Latrice Royale, and Alyssa Edwards.

== Personal life ==
Philipps is originally from Dayton, Ohio. She lives in New York City, and previously lived in Los Angeles during the COVID-19 pandemic. She came out as a trans woman in 2024, and previously identified as non-binary.

== Filmography ==
- RuPaul's Drag Race (season 16)
- Bring Back My Girls

== Discography ==
=== Singles ===
==== As lead artist ====
Year	Title	Album	Writer(s)	Producer(s)	Ref(s)
2024	"Just a Girl"	Personality Hire	Gwen Stefani, Tom Dumont	Jasno Swarez	
2024	"No Good Deed"	Non-album singles	Stephen Schwartz	Andres Abenante	
2024	"My Kitty"	Non-album singles	Drew Louis, Amanda Tori Meating	Drew Louis	

=== Extended plays ===
Title	Details
Personality Hire	Released: April 26, 2024; Label: Self released; Formats: Digital download, streaming; Track listing: 1. "Just a Girl"; 2. "Do What U Gotta Do"; 3. "Blue Hair"; 4. "Damaged"

== See also ==
- Drag culture in New York City
- LGBTQ culture in New York City
- List of LGBTQ people from New York City
- NYC Drag March
- NYC Pride March
- Transgender culture in New York City
