= Q (drag queen) =

American drag performer

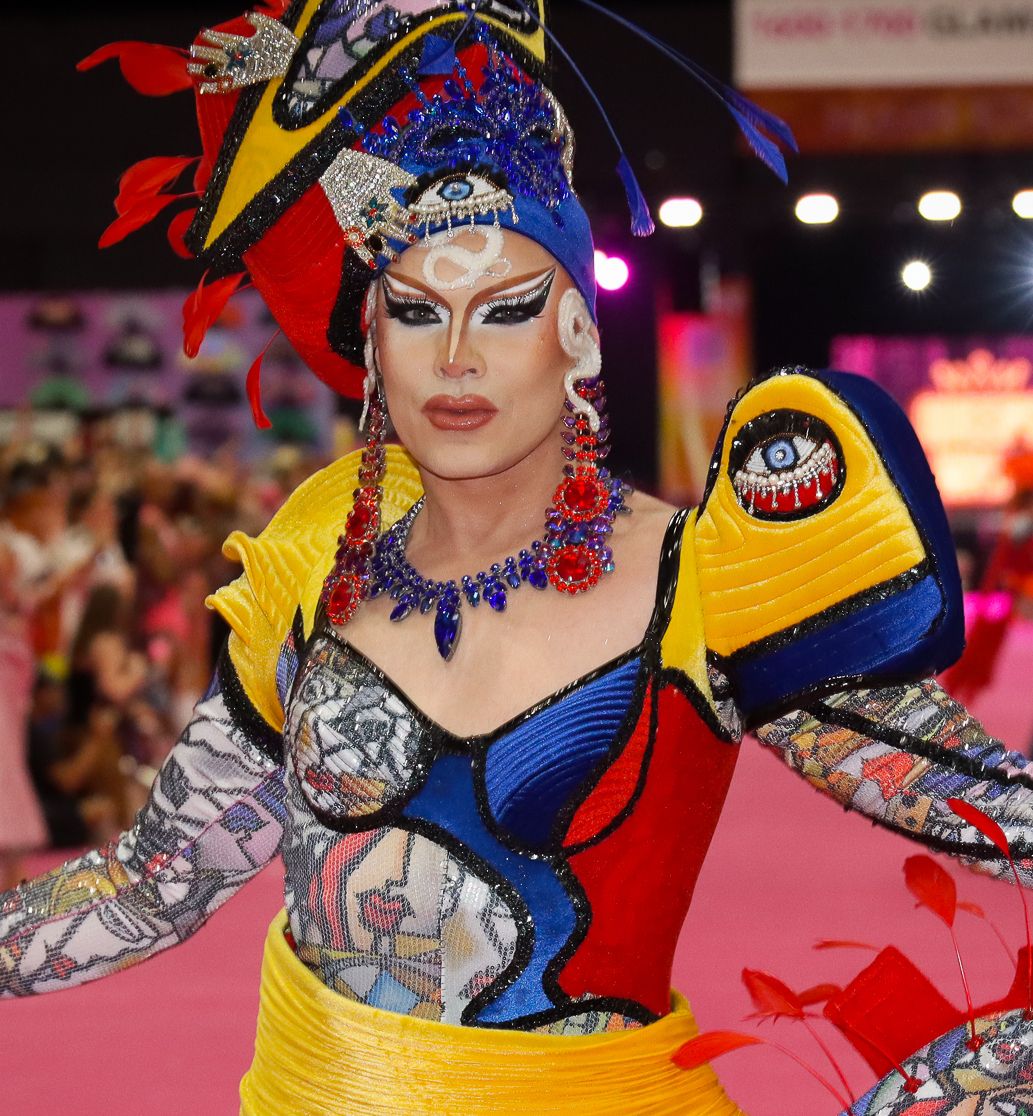
- Q at RuPaul's DragCon LA, 2024
- Born: Robert Severson; August 22, 1996 (age 30); Emporia, Kansas, U.S.
- Education: University of Kansas (BA)
- Occupation: Drag queen
- Television: RuPaul's Drag Race (season 16)

Q (born August 22, 1996) is the stage name of Robert Severson, an American drag performer who competed on season 16 of RuPaul's Drag Race. In 2026, He competed on season 22 of Project Runway.

== Career ==
Q competed on season 16 of RuPaul's Drag Race. His looks are self-made, and he has created costumes for other Drag Race contestants. On the show, Q revealed that he is HIV positive.

== Personal life ==
Severson is from Emporia, Kansas and resides in Kansas City, Missouri. He graduated from Emporia High School in 2014. He then began studying pharmacy at the University of Kansas graduating with a theatre arts degree, giving the graduation speech.

== Filmography ==
- RuPaul's Drag Race (season 16)
- RuPaul's Drag Race: Untucked
- Bring Back My Girls

== See also ==
- List of University of Kansas people
