= Geneva Karr =

Drag performer

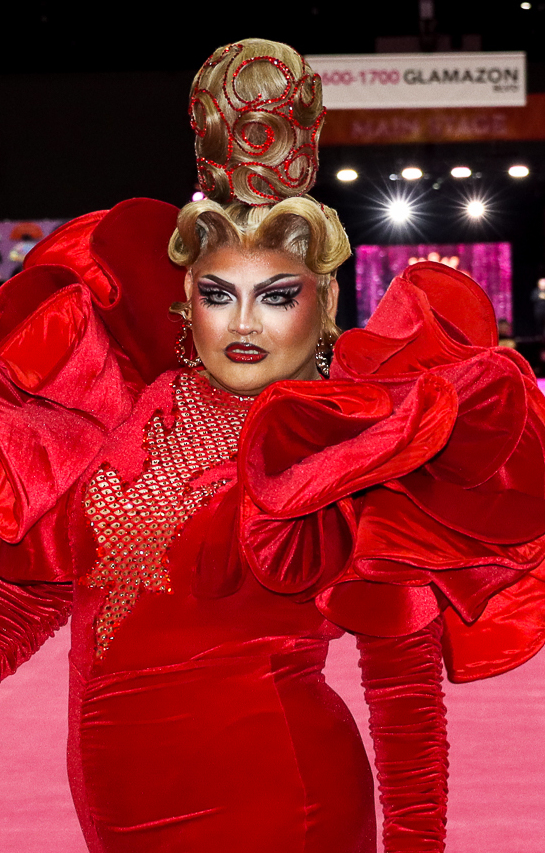
- Geneva Karr at RuPaul's DragCon LA, 2024
- Born: 1992 or 1993 (age 32–33); Tamaulipas, Mexico
- Occupation: Drag queen
- Television: RuPaul's Drag Race (season 16)

Geneva Karr (born 1992/1993) is a Mexican drag performer based in the United States (under DACA) who competed on season 16 of RuPaul's Drag Race.

== Early life ==
Geneva Karr was born in the Mexican state of Tamaulipas. He immigrated to the United States when he was 7 with his parents and brother. He and fellow season 16 queen Xunami Muse, who's originally from Panama, are DACA kids. Karr started doing drag in Brownsville and other neighboring cities and towns like McAllen, Weslaco, and Houston, Texas.

== Career ==
Geneva Karr is a drag performer who competed on season 16 of RuPaul's Drag Race. He is the first Mexico-born contestant on the show, as well as the first to represent the Rio Grande Valley.

== Personal life ==
Geneva Karr is based in Brownsville, Texas.

== Filmography ==
- RuPaul's Drag Race (season 16)
- RuPaul's Drag Race: Untucked
- Whatcha Packin' (2024)
- Hey Qween! (2024)
- Bring Back My Girls
