= Nigel Xavier =

Atlanta-based fashion designer

- Born: November 29, 1994 (age 31); California
- Education: Savannah College of Art and Design (BFA)
- Occupation: Fashion designer

Nigel Xavier (born November 29, 1994) is an Atlanta-based fashion designer who grew up in Boardman, Ohio known for his patchwork and textile manipulation. In 2023, he was named the Next in Fashion Season 2 winner.

== Early life and education ==
Xavier was born in California on November 29, 1994, to Marshall and Stella Xavier. In 2010, he moved to Atlanta, Georgia, and spent a lot of time in Summerhill. Xavier was a former high school football player but chose to go down the fashion route. He graduated B.F.A. Fashion from SCAD Atlanta (Savannah College of Art and Design) in 2016.

== Career ==
Xavier works as a fashion designer in Georgia. He specializes in denim clothing, drawing heavily from the 90s and early 2000s fashion.

Before joining Next in Fashion Season 2, Xavier had already created designs for celebrities, including Tyga and Summer Walker, among several others. He also had the opportunity to style the rapper 2 Chainz.

== Next in Fashion ==
Xavier joined the Next in Fashion Season 2, which was aired all episodes on March 3, 2023. He made it to the Finale, where he competed against his fellow designer contestants Bao Tranchi and Deontre Hancock. With his 8 outfits collection in the finale, inspired by Woodstock, Xavier was named the Next in Fashion Season 2 and won the grand cash prize of $200,000.

The judges and hosts, Gigi Hadid, Jason Bolden, and Tan France, found his collection fun, while representing his brand and creating a cohesive collection to showcase on the runway in three days. Aside from the prize money, Xavier also got a deal with Rent The Runway.
