= Project Runway season 22 =

2026 season of television series

Project Runway
- Season 22
- Promotional poster for season twenty-two
- Judges: Heidi Klum; Nina García; Law Roach; Tyra Banks
- No. of contestants: 22
- No. of episodes: 10

Release
- Original network: Freeform
- Original release: July 9 – September 10, 2026

Season chronology
- ← Previous; Season 21

The twenty-second season of Project Runway premiered on July 9, 2026 on cable network Freeform, and on streaming after on Hulu and Disney+. Following the success of its maiden Freeform season, the series returns with a record-breaking 22 designers, the largest cast of any Project Runway season.

Heidi Klum returns as host and head judge, as well as resident judges Nina Garcia and Law Roach. Christian Siriano resumes his role as mentor to the designers. Tyra Banks joins the judging panel as a recurring judge.

The winner was Jude Mikulencak, which he received a $200,000 cash prize, a feature spread in Elle magazine, mentorship with the Council of Fashion Designers of America (CFDA), and professional representation to launch his brand.

== Contestants ==
The cast was released on Project Runway's official Instagram and as an exclusive on People. Notable contestants in the cast include Joseph McRae from season 21, RuPaul's Drag Race contestants Andrew Dunayevskiy and Robert Crone, Miss Universe 2022 R'Bonney Nola, and Bao Tranchi from Next In Fashion Season 2.

Project Runway season 22 contestants and their backgrounds (Note: All ages, names, with hometowns, and outcome are stated at time of filming.)
Contestant	Age	Hometown	Finish	Outcome
Andrea Moore	28	New York City, New York	Episode 1	17th Place
Jennifer Daniels (Note: Jennifer previously appeared on Project Runway as a model.)	28	Atlanta, Georgia	Episode 1	17th Place
Omolara "LRÉ" Odupita	TBA	Los Angeles, California	Episode 1	17th Place
Andrew "Plane Jane" Dunayevskiy	28	Boston, Massachusetts	Episode 1	17th Place
R'Bonney Nola	32	Houston, Texas	Episode 1	17th Place
Robert "Q" Crone	29	Kansas City, Missouri	Episode 1	17th Place
Octavius Terry	53	Atlanta, Georgia	Episode 2	13th place
Dani Bennett	28	Los Angeles, California	Episode 2	13th place
Bao Tranchi	48	Los Angeles, California	Episode 2	13th place
Yangyang Xu	28	New York City, New York	Episode 2	13th place
Andriy Volkov	TBA	Manhattan, New York	Episode 3	11th place
Chloe Magleby	27	Provo, Utah	Episode 3	11th place
Aaron Potts	TBA	Detroit, Michigan	Episode 4	10th place
Elizabeth Shevelev	29	New York City, New York	Episode 5	9th place
Varvara "Bobby" Diakonenkova	28	Moscow, Russia	Episode 6	8th place
Jeffrey Kelly Abess	39	Orlando, Florida	Episode 8	7th place
Bryan Barrientos	38	Paterson, New Jersey	Episode 9	5th place
Naheim Muhammad	23	Los Angeles, California	Episode 9	5th place
Joseph McRae (Note: Joseph McRae previously competed on season twenty-one, placing ninth.)	28	Charlotte, North Carolina	Episode 10	Runner-Up
Bi Pham	37	Da Nang, Vietnam	Episode 10	Runner-Up
Anna Molinari	34	New York City, New York	Episode 10	Runner-Up
Jude Mikulencak	23	Brooklyn, New York	Episode 10	Winner

== Progress ==
Legend:

WIN indicates that the contestant won the challenge.
IMM indicates that the contestant was immune for this round of the challenge.
HIGH indicates that the contestant had one of the highest score in the challenge, but did not win it.
IN indicates that the contestant was declared safe.
SAVE indicates that the contestant was saved after being eliminated.
LOW indicates that the contestant had one of the lowest score in the challenge, but was not eliminated.
OUT indicates that the contestant was eliminated.

Contestant	Episode									
Contestant	1	2	3	4	5	6	7	8	9	10
Jude	WIN	IMM	IN	WIN	IMM	LOW	IN	WIN	HIGH	Winner
Anna	IN	HIGH	IN	HIGH	LOW	IN	IN	HIGH	WIN	Runner-up
Bi	IN	SAVE	HIGH	LOW	HIGH	HIGH	WIN	IN	IN	Runner-up
Joseph	IN	WIN	WIN	IMM	IN	IN	HIGH	LOW	LOW	Runner-up
Bryan	WIN	IMM	HIGH	LOW	HIGH	WIN	IMM	SAVE	OUT	
Naheim	IN	LOW	HIGH	IN	WIN	IMM	IN	LOW	OUT	Guest
Jeffrey	LOW	HIGH	LOW	IN	HIGH	HIGH	LOW	OUT		Guest
Bobby	WIN	IMM	LOW	IN	LOW	OUT				
Elizabeth	WIN	IMM	HIGH	IN	OUT					
Aaron	IN	LOW	HIGH	OUT						Guest
Andriy	WIN	IMM	OUT							
Chloe	WIN	IMM	OUT	Guest						
Bao	IN	OUT								Guest
Dani	LOW	OUT								
Octavius	IN	OUT								
Yangyang	IN	OUT								
Andrea	OUT	Guest								
Jennifer	OUT	Guest								
LRÉ	OUT	Guest								
Plane Jane	OUT	Guest								
R'Bonney	OUT	Guest								
Robert	OUT	Guest								

== Episodes ==
No. overall	No. in season	Title	Original release date	U.S. viewers (millions)
270	1	"22 for Season 22"	9 July 2026	0.381
22 designers meet Heidi and Christian in New York preparing to show a look that was prepared at home. In a surprising twist, 6 designers will be judged ‘best on the runway’ gaining immunity for the second challenge and 6 will be eliminated from the competition.: Guest Judge: N/A; Runway Theme: Your Best Look; Challenge Winners: Bryan, Jude, Bobby, Elizabeth, Andriy & Chloe; Eliminated: Andrea, Jennifer, LRÉ, Plane Jane, R'Bonney & Robert
271	2	"Ready, Set, Redemption!"	16 July 2026	N/A
Of the 10 designers without immunity only 6 will be kept in the competition. A 12 person jury made up of the 6 with immunity and the 6 previously eliminated are tasked with the decision on who to save.: Special Guest: Guest Judge: Ice Spice; Runway Theme: Redemption Look; Challenge Winner: Joseph; Eliminated: Bao, Dani, Octavius & Yangyang
272	3	"In It to Win It"	23 July 2026	N/A
Designers split into four fashion houses must create runway looks inspired by NFL teams. Two designers will be eliminated.: Special Guest: Guest Judge: Ciara; Runway Theme: NFL Inspired Capsule Collection; Challenge Winner: Joseph; Eliminated: Andriy and Chloe
273	4	"Catwalk on the Wild Side"	30 July 2026	N/A
In a series of head-to-head matchups, the designers create looks inspired by wild animals. Special guest models from Hulu's Get Real lineup bring the contestants' creations to life on the runway.: Special Guest: Guest Judge: N/A; Runway Theme: Wild Animals Inspiration; Challenge Winner: Jude; Eliminated: Aaron
274	5	"Viva la Fashion"	6 August 2026	N/A
Designers must transform paper towels into high-fashion runway looks, as well as name who they believe is the weakest designer amongst them.: Guest Judge: Willy Chavarria; Runway Theme: Viva la Fashion; Challenge Winner: Naheim; Eliminated: Elizabeth
275	6	"The Devil's in the Details"	13 August 2026	N/A
The designers compete to create a red-carpet look for Heidi Klum to wear at the premiere of The Devil Wears Prada 2. The winning designer selects the bottom three contestants facing elimination.: Guest Judges: Nina Dobrev and Winnie Harlow; Runway Theme: Red Carpet Look; Challenge Winner: Bryan; Eliminated: Bobby
276	7	"Battle of the Seasons"	20 August 2026	N/A
Six returning contestants from Season 21 face off against the Season 22 designers in an unconventional materials challenge based on transforming obsolete electronics and bygone-era tech.: Special Guest: Guest Judge: Iman; Runway Theme: Unconventional Materials; Challenge Winner: Bi; Eliminated: N/A
277	8	"Designing with the Stars"	27 August 2026	N/A
The remaining contestants design high-fashion, movement-friendly looks inspired by specific dance genres for professional ballroom dancers.: Special Guest: Guest Judge: Niecy Nash-Betts; Runway Theme: Dance Inspired Look; Challenge Winner: Jude; Eliminated: Jeffrey
278	9	"Put a Ring on It"	3 September 2026	TBD
The remaining six contestants face a bridal couture challenge requiring them to design both an elegant wedding gown and a high-fashion afterparty look.: Guest Judges: Kiernan Shipka and Sergio Hudson; Runway Theme: Wedding Inspired Look; Challenge Winner: Anna; Eliminated: Naheim and Bryan
279	10	"The Finale"	10 September 2026	TBD
Joseph McRae advances. The final four designers with create a cohesive five-look capsule collection that reflects their definitive brand identity. Jude is crowned the winner of Season 22.: Guest Judge: Fausto Puglisi; Runway Theme: 5-piece capsule collection; Winner of Project Runway Season 22: Jude; Runner-ups: Anna, Bi & Joseph
