= Charles Lu =

Canadian fashion designer (born 1991)

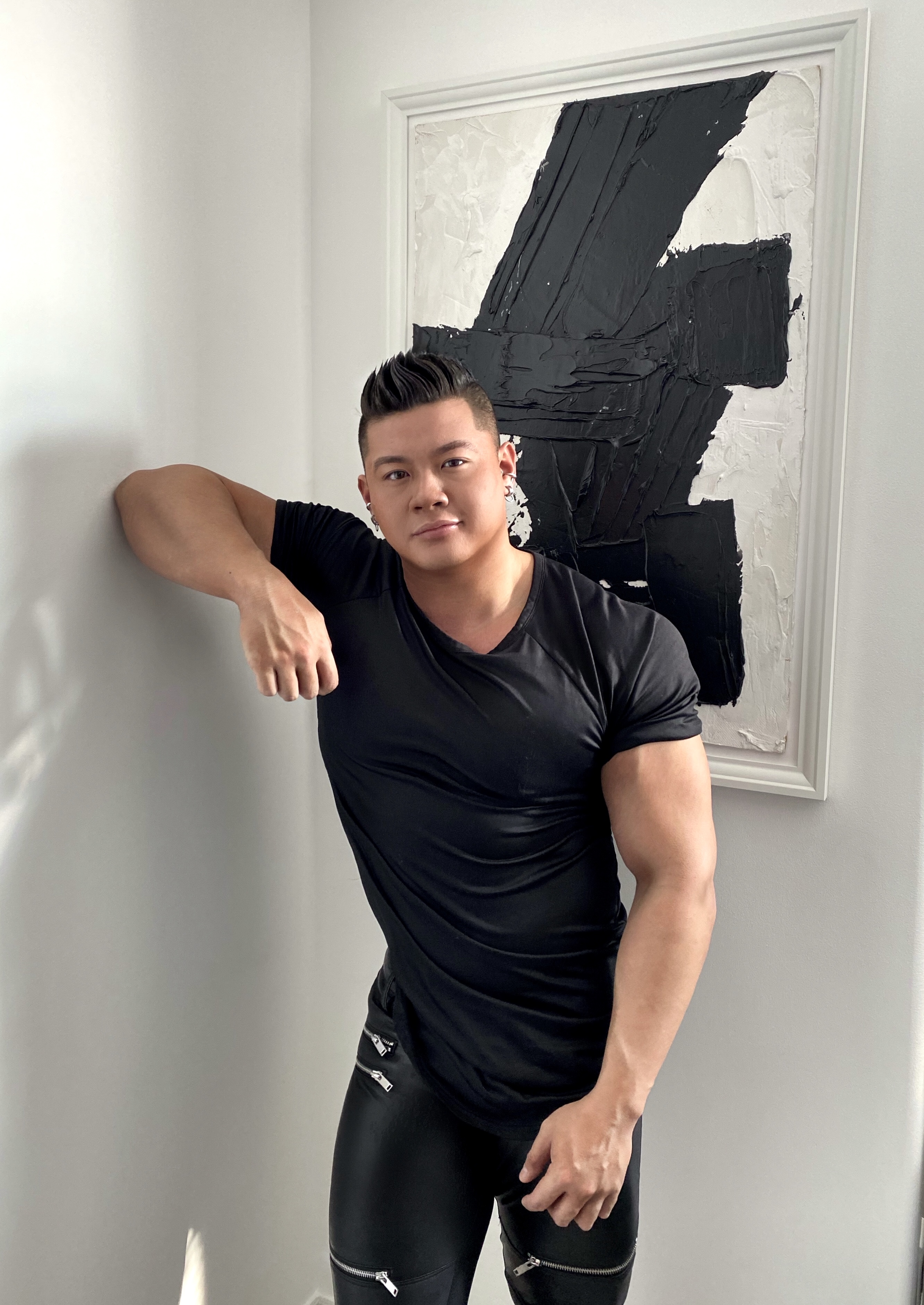
- Charles Lu
- Born: March 1, 1991 (age 35); Hamilton, Ontario, Canada
- Education: Istituto Marangoni (London)
- Occupations: Fashion designer; brand consultant
- Known for: Next in Fashion
- Television: Fashion designer/participant in Netflix's Next In Fashion
- Height: 170 cm (5 ft 7 in)
- Website: charles-lu.com

Charles Lu (born c. 1991) is a Canadian fashion designer known for his womenswear, evening-wear, and garment construction. In 2020, he participated as a fashion design contestant on Netflix's original reality fashion design competition series, Next in Fashion.

== Early life and education ==
Charles Lu was born and raised in Hamilton, Ontario, Canada. He is of Vietnamese descent and his parents are Vietnamese refugees who now reside in Canada. They were not always understanding of his career path but have always been supportive. He presented his first fashion show at 13 with his pieces produced from both recycled and unconventional materials found around his father's appliance store. In 2007, while attending Cardinal Newman Secondary, Charles produced a 21-look collection as part of 'DREAM Big Show' charity event with the DREAMS Team committee (Dominican Republic Education and Medical Supplies). The charity event took place on November 27, 2007 pairing music and fashion together. They raised 11,000 dollars. All of the proceeds from the event went towards funding the promotion of awareness and aid of those less fortunate in the Dominican Republic. After graduating high school at 18, Charles went on to study fashion design at the Italian design school, Instituto Marangoni in London, UK.

== Career ==
Charles Lu spent a decade building his career abroad both in London, UK and Dubai, UAE. After graduating Instituto Marangoni, London in 2012 with a degree in fashion/apparel design, he was appointed the role of co-creator and creative director of Veni Vici Couture, and shortly after, he assumed the position of designer and brand consultant at Shawish Genève Jewellery where he designed for both houses in tandem .

In 2016, Charles relocated to Dubai, UAE where he was appointed the position of head creative director for Arushi Couture for three years until 2019. Under his direction, Charles produced three demi-couture collections under the label, 'Arushi Couture X Charles Lu'. His introductory collection for Arushi Couture was a spring-summer 2017 'made-to-order' collection titled, 'INARA SS17'. The collection was inspired by modern architecture with the use of clean lines representing light on glass and metal. Architect, Zaha Hadid was a primary influence with Charles referencing her use of biomorphic shapes and against the backdrop of black and white. The collection had notes of Japanese linear minimalism, art deco architecture, and cited historical garment construction. The collection highlighted the theme of extremes such as: light and dark, soft and hard,

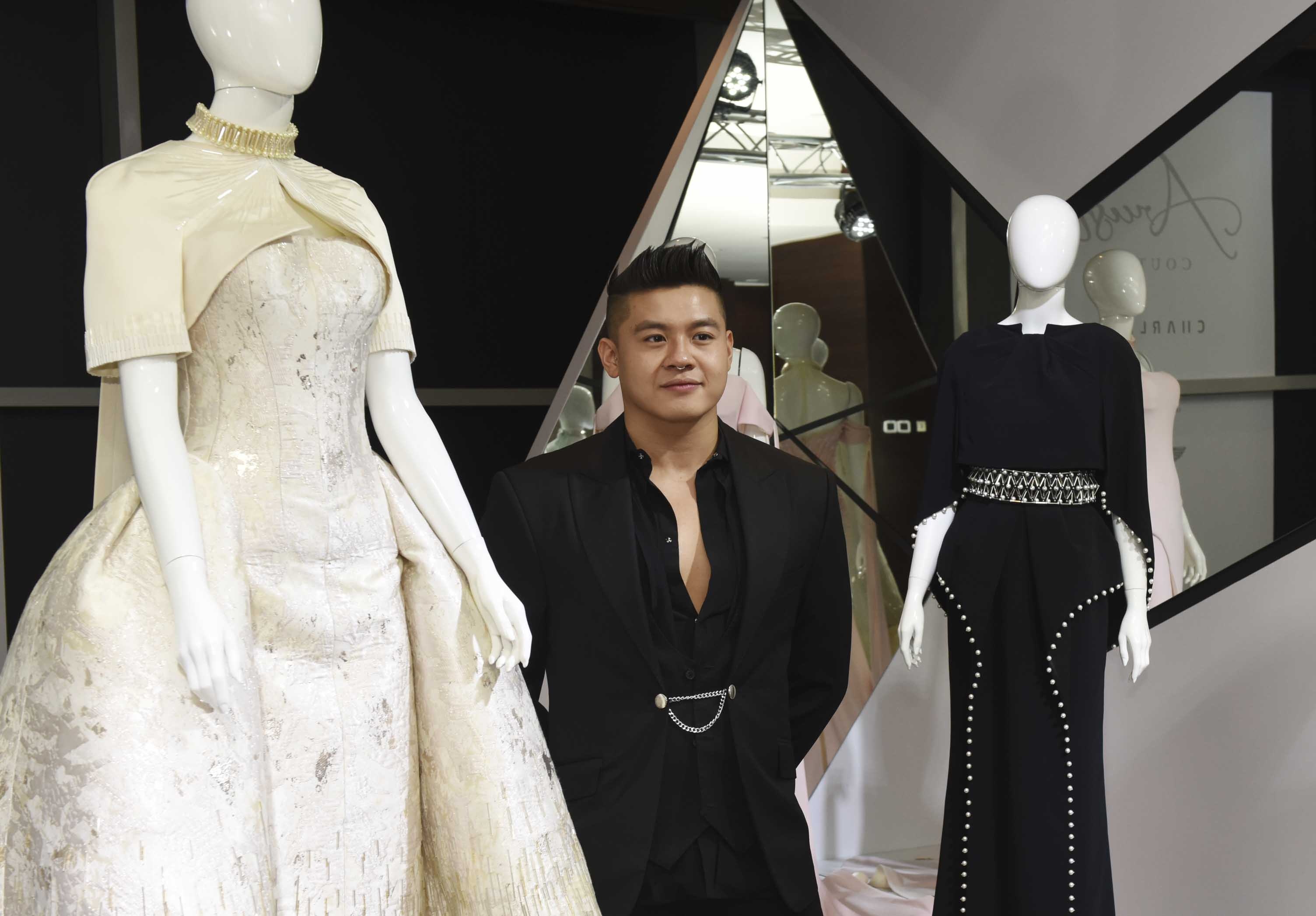
Charles Lu at Debut Collection

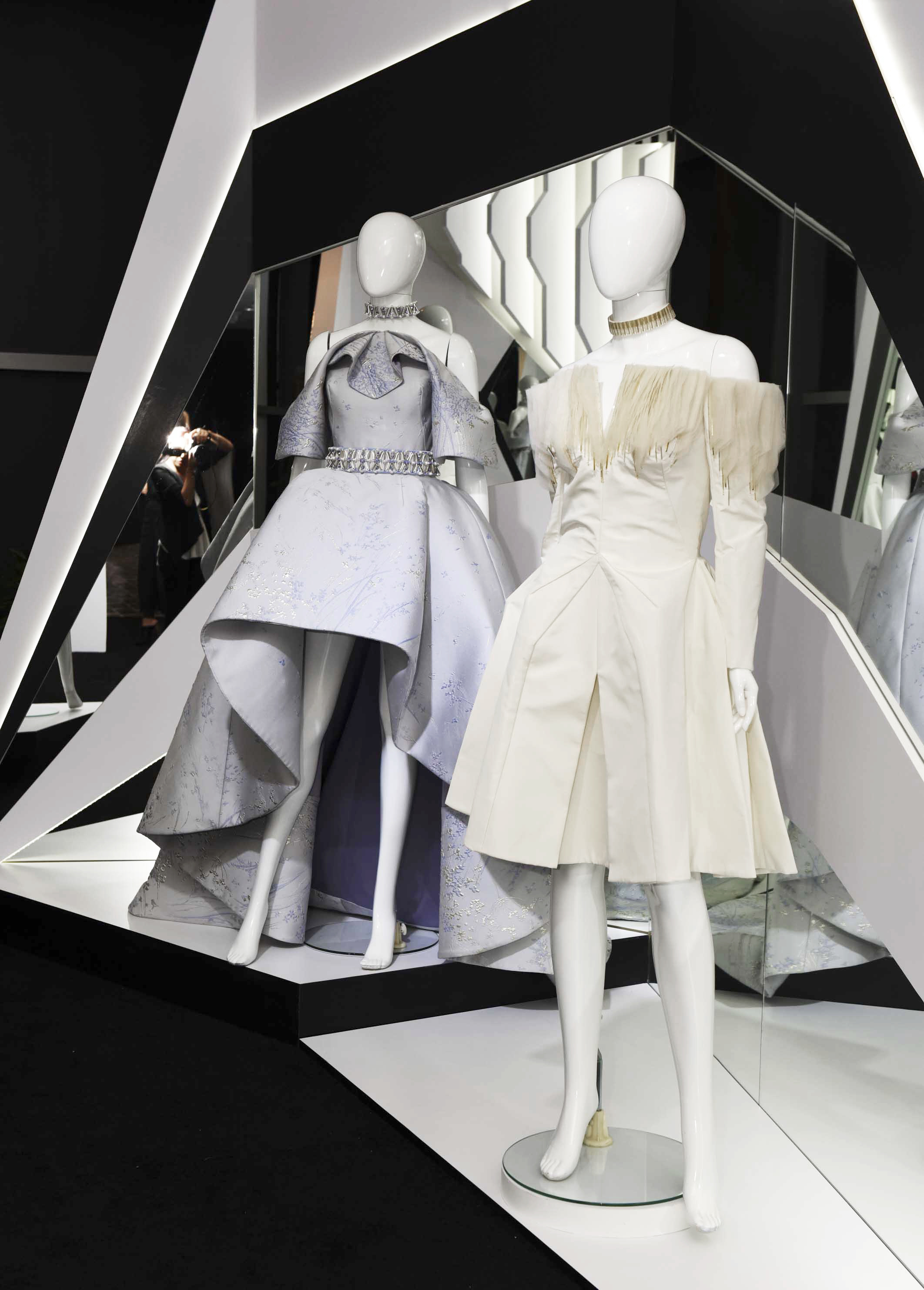
Debut Fashion Collection - Dubai 2017

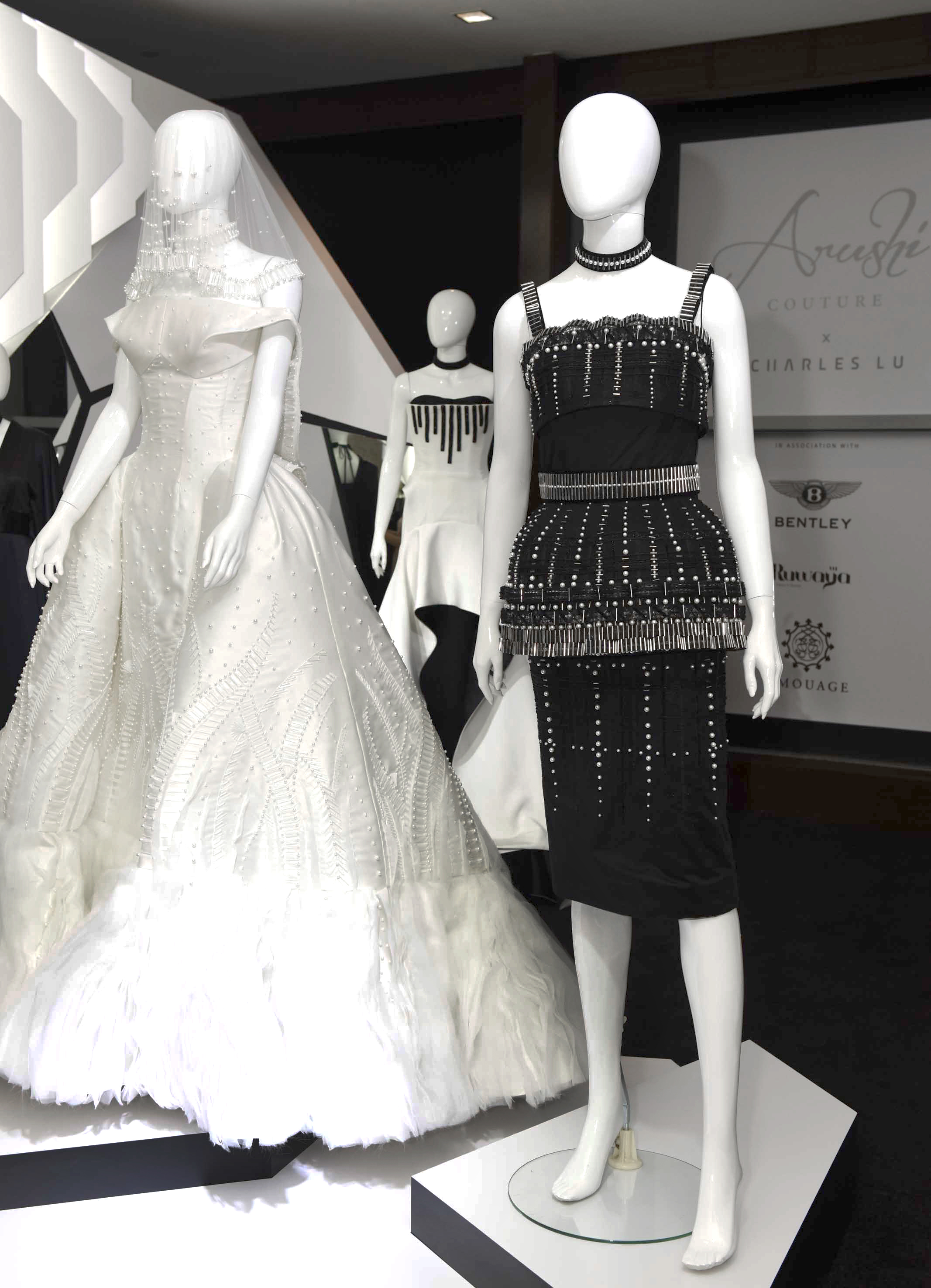
Debut Fashion Collection - Dubai 2017

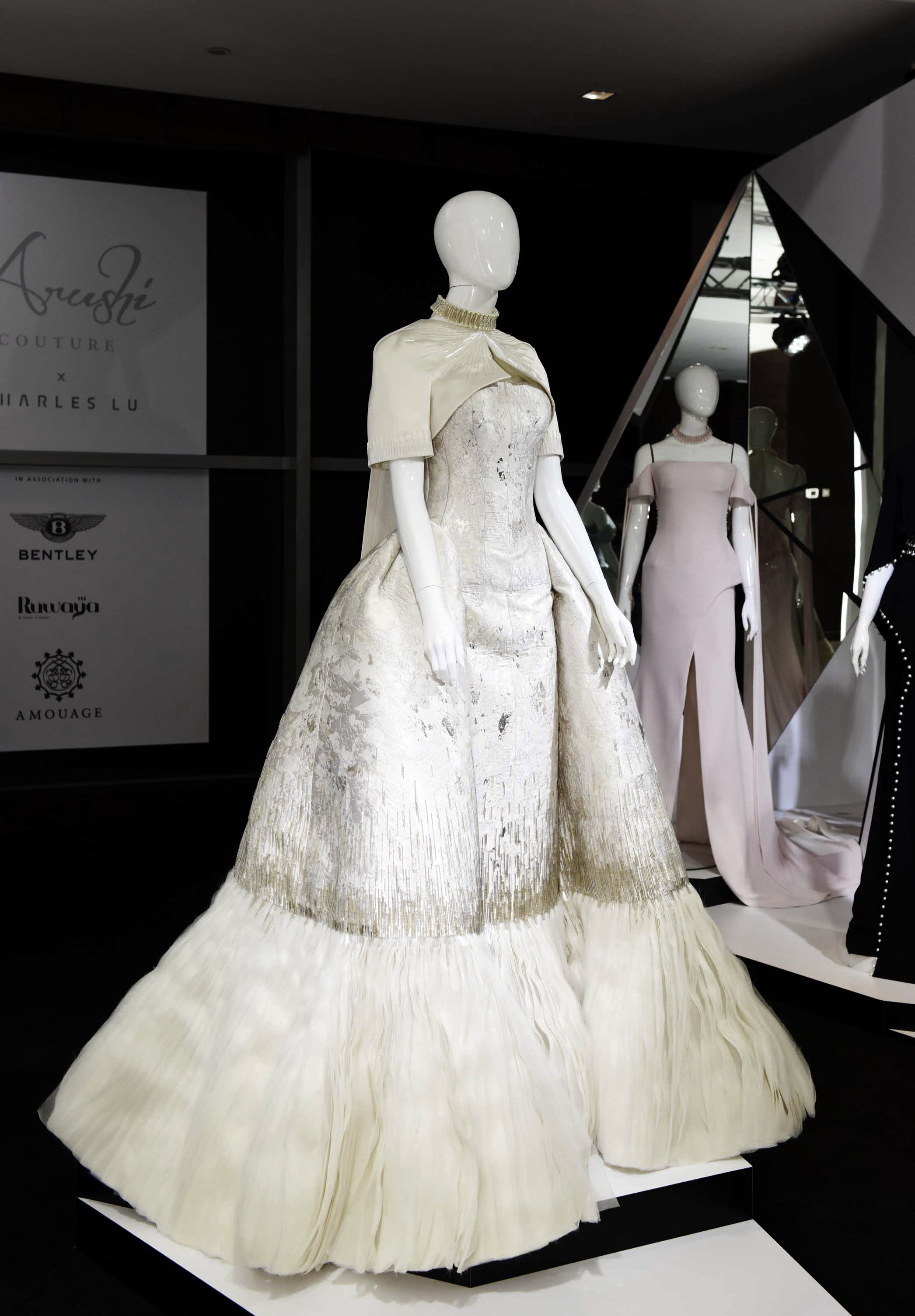
Debut Fashion Collection - Dubai 2017

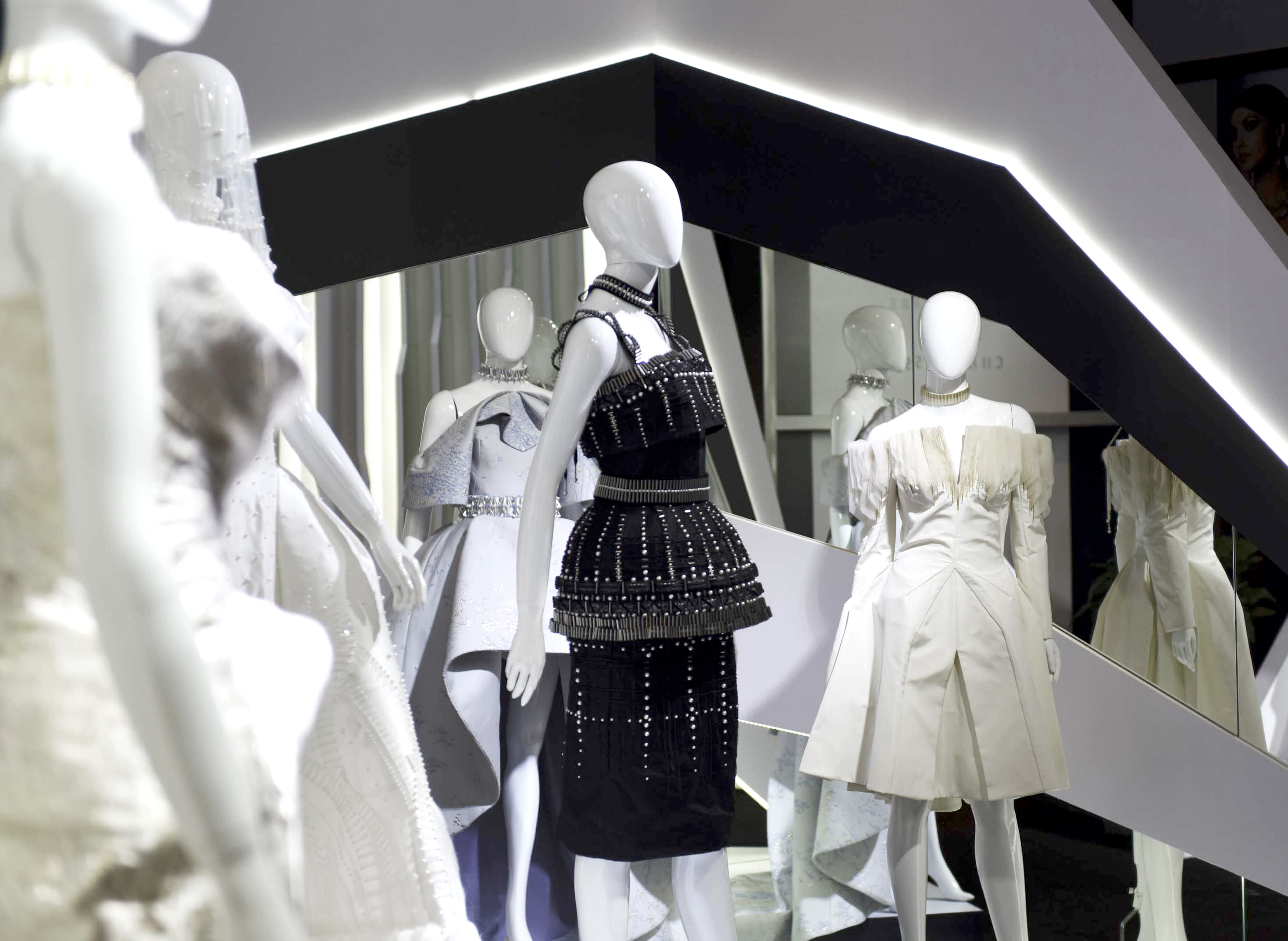
Debut Fashion Collection - Dubai 2017

In 2019, toward the end of his tenure as the creative director for Arushi Couture, Charles Lu went on to participate in Netflix's new original fashion design competition series, Next in Fashion, where filming began on April until May 2019 in Los Angeles. Post-show airing, Charles is now in the process of setting up his own eponymous design label.

== Participation on Next in Fashion ==
The Netflix original fashion design competition show, Next in Fashion was announced in May 2019, with co-hosts Alexa Chung and Tan France attached, as well as stylist Elizabeth Stewart and Instagram's Eva Chen as judges. Filming wrapped in May 2019 and the network streaming premiere took place in January 2020. In the 10-episode fashion design competition series, contestants are paired up, compelling two different designers to work together with the goal of producing a cohesive look to present.

The show featured 18 international designers on a global scale. Charles Lu was the only Canadian on the show. Prior to the show, Charles worked exclusively with evening-wear but adapted with the various weekly design challenges. He was partnered with an Italian fashion designer, Angelo Cruciani. The two designers did not have a pre-existing relationship, both only physically meeting a week prior to filming. They connected briefly online and were noted for their differing yet complimentary approaches to design. The designers were challenged in each episode to complete look in just a day and a half. Charles and Angelo were paired together from episodes 1–6. Charles remained until episode 8 after the pair's separation, with his own elimination occurring during Episode 8, the ”Military" challenge. Charles was noted for his technical ability in garment construction. Charles and Angelo won the first challenge, Episode 1: ‘Red Carpet'. He was placed in the top for 6 challenges and was placed in the bottom the first time during his elimination. In an interview with the CBC, Canada, Charles details that his experience was rigorous and difficult but was a large period of growth for him. He was also the only contestant without a namesake brand label during filming.

Charles Lu left during episode 8 in 5th/6th place.

=== Designer progress on Next in Fashion ===
Fashion Designer	Episodes									
Fashion Designer	1	2	3	4^{[a]}	5	6	7	8	9	10
Charles Lu	WIN	SAFE	HIGH	HIGH	HIGH	HIGH	HIGH	ELIM		
Angelo Cruciani	WIN	SAFE	HIGH	HIGH	HIGH	HIGH	ELIM			

^{[a]}Because the judges were unable to agree, no-one was eliminated this challenge.

The designer/design team won the challenge.
The designer/design team was considered to win the challenge, but was ultimately safe.
The designer lost and was eliminated from the competition.

== Personal life ==
Charles Lu stays active at the gym, using the time as a tool to alleviate stress and anxiety.

== See also ==
- Next in Fashion
