= James Ford (fashion designer) =

American fashion designer

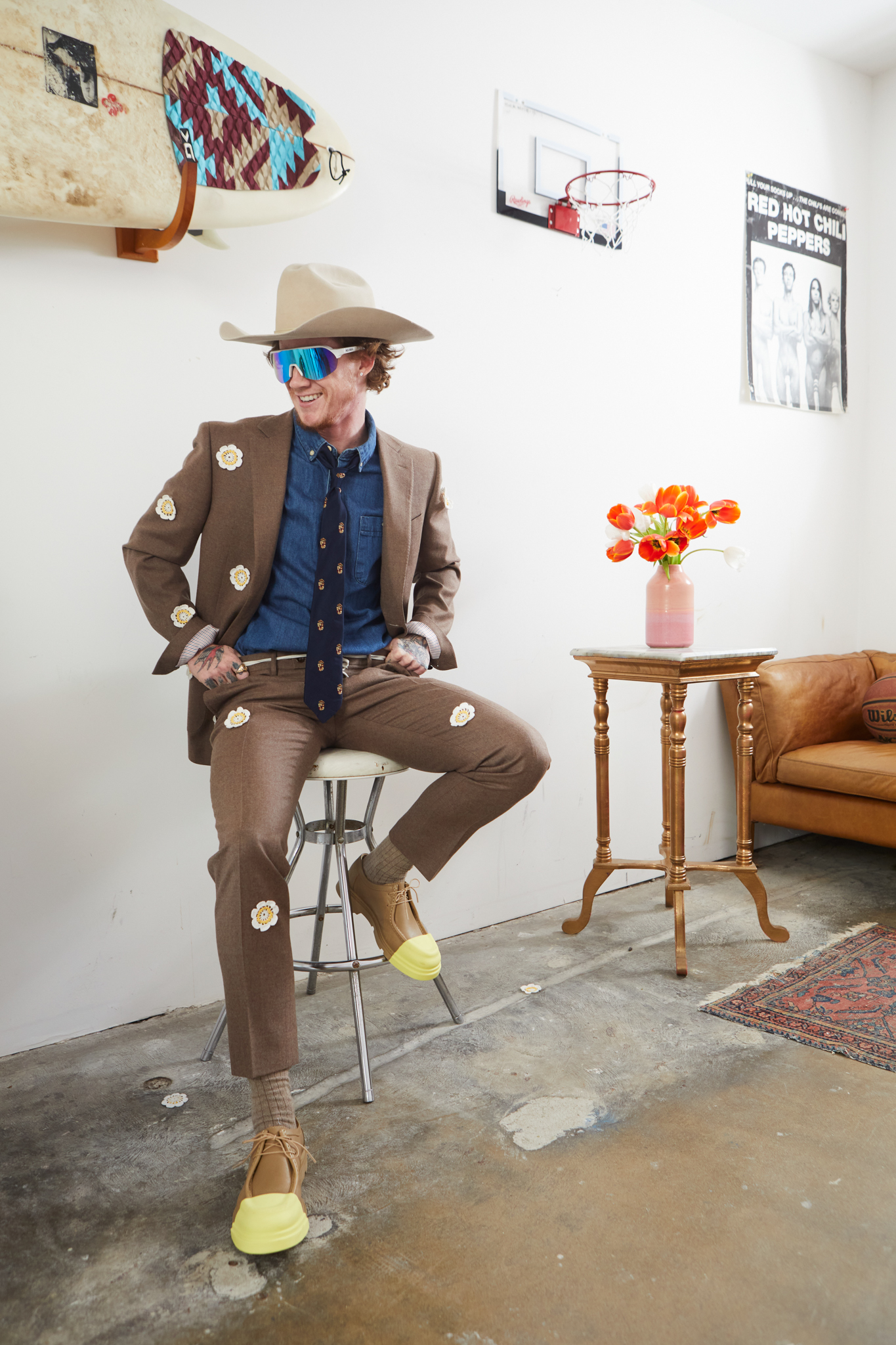
James Ford in the Rowena Social Club Daisy Suit, Spring/Summer 23 Collection "Daisy Cowboy"

James Ford is a Los Angeles-based fashion designer. He was a competitor on Netflix's Next in Fashion in 2023, hosted by Gigi Hadid and Tan France.

== Early life and education ==
Ford was born and raised in Kentucky. In 2009 he moved to Fort Collins, Colorado. Ford was a high school athlete playing basketball, baseball, soccer and track, achieving many notable awards and distinctions. In 2013, he graduated from Colorado State University with a B.S. in Construction Engineering. He later earned an M.A. from the University of Southern California in Fashion Journalism in 2017.

== Career ==
Ford worked in commercial fashion for the cashmere brand, the Elder Statesman and LA-based workwear company Hedley & Bennett. In 2020, he started his own line, Rowena Social Club, where he remains the president and creative director. The brand is an e-comm clothing and apparel line, focusing on serving the LGBTQ market both in the U.S. and internationally.

Since then, he has styled and designed for Beth Dover (Orange Is the New Black), Melissa Fumero (Brooklyn Nine-Nine), Andrew McMahon (Something Corporate, Jack's Mannequin), ND Stevenson (Nimona), and Fortune Feimster (Handsome podcast, Netflix).

Ford was a contestant on Season 2 of Netflix's Next in Fashion, hosted by Gigi Hadid and Tan France. Ford appeared in five episodes and was eliminated during the fifth challenge.

== Fashion Awards and Recognition ==
Ford was awarded the "Best Emerging Designer" in June 2023 by I Am Musicology. He was also honored at USC receiving the Jack Langguth Award in 2019 for his contribution to journalism.

== Outfit: the Podcast ==
Ford published two seasons totaling 9 episodes of his podcast, Outfit, which explores the relationship of the LGBTQ community and their clothing. This served as his Master's Thesis in Fashion Journalism, from 2017-2019. His podcast went on to be featured on Elle Canada's Top 9 Best Fashion Podcasts of 2019.
