= Daniel W. Fletcher =

London-based menswear designer

Daniel Fletcher
- Born: 21 September 1990 (age 35); Chester, England, United Kingdom
- Occupation: Fashion designer
- Website: www.danielwfletcher.com

Daniel W. Fletcher (born 21 September 1990) is a London-based fashion designer who operates his own namesake brand, Daniel w. Fletcher. In 2020, he came runner-up in Netflix's Next in Fashion Season 1.

== Early life and education ==
Originally from Chester, North West of England, Fletcher first took an interest in menswear when he enrolled in an art foundation course at Kingston University. He then moved to London to study at Central Saint Martins, where he took a four-year BA degree in fashion design.

== Fashion career ==
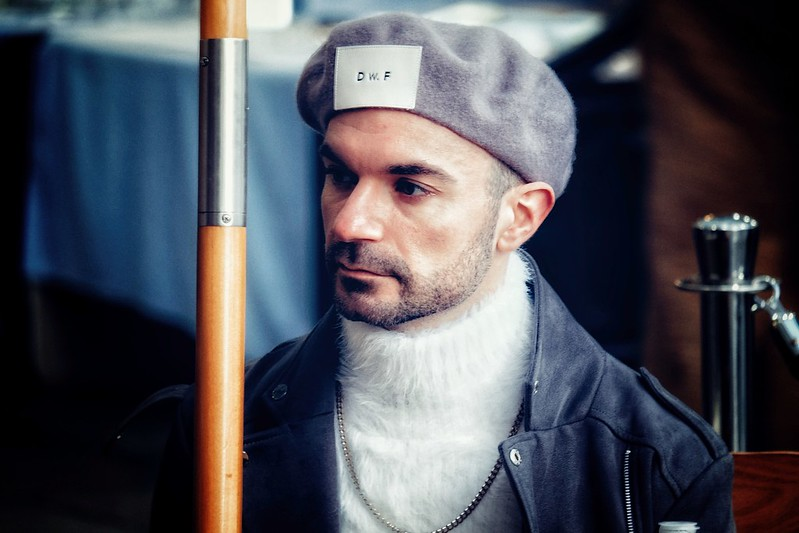
A man wearing a Daniel w. Fletcher beret with a DWF logo on the front.

After graduation, Fletcher launched his urban menswear brand, Daniel w. Fletcher. Before starting his label, he gained experience from a handful of internships at James Long in London and Lanvin and Louis Vuitton in Paris. In 2015, Harry Styles was his first client, buying all of the boxy short-sleeved shirts he had made for his graduate collection. He made all of his shirts an inch longer for Styles, and they have remained that length ever since. Throughout his final year at university, Fletcher also worked at Victoria Beckham, which helped him finance and execute his label as well as through brand sponsorships from Saga Furs and Inditex.

Fletcher kickstarted the 2022 London Fashion Week at The Londoner Hotel’s ballroom with his SS23 fashion show. The show had a one-minute silence in tribute to Queen Elizabeth II's death. The collection was dedicated to his father and three close friends, who all died in 2021.

Fletcher also serves as artistic director for Italian heritage label Fiorucci.

== Awards ==
Fletcher received the River Island x BFC Fashion Film Award 2016 for his fashion film, Stay. He was nominated for the prestigious LVMH prize in 2017 and has garnered several award wins: European Semi-Final of the International Woolmark Prize 2018, a Future British Award, and has been named Drapers 30 Under 30.

In 2020, Fletcher was awarded Breakthrough Designer of The Year by British GQ and a favored designer by pop star Harry Styles. That same year, he took part in Netflix’s Next in Fashion and reached the finale against Minju Kim. In October 2023, Fletcher won The Style Award in the 2023 Virgin Atlantic Attitude Awards.
