= Angela Chen (disambiguation) =

Angela Chen is a Chinese businesswoman.

Angela Chen may also refer to:

- Angel Chen (born 1991), Chinese fashion designer
- Angela Tanoesoedibjo (born 1987), Indonesian politician and businessperson
- Angela Chen (comics), a character in the DC Comics universe

== See also ==
- Angela Cheng (born 1959), Hong Kong-born Canadian classical pianist
- Angela Chan (born 1967), American fashion designer
