= Next in Fashion =

Reality television show

- Genre: Reality competition
- Starring: Tan France; Alexa Chung; Gigi Hadid
- Country of origin: United States
- Original language: English
- No. of seasons: 2
- No. of episodes: 20

Production
- Executive producers: Robin Ashbrook; Yasmin Shackleton
- Running time: 50 Minutes
- Production company: The Oldschool

Original release
- Network: Netflix
- Release: January 29, 2020 – March 3, 2023

Next in Fashion (NIF) is a reality show and fashion design competition series hosted by fashion designer Tan France and model Gigi Hadid (formerly hosted by France and fellow designer Alexa Chung). It follows designers from around the world as they compete for the chance to win $250,000 and debut a collection on luxury fashion retailer site Net-a-Porter.

In June 2020, Netflix announced it was cancelling the series after one season. Nevertheless, it was announced on the series’s Instagram that the show would have a second season that would feature Tan France and Gigi Hadid. The second season premiered on March 3, 2023.

== Production ==
The show was announced in May 2019, with co-hosts Alexa Chung and Tan France attached, as well as stylist Elizabeth Stewart and Instagram's Eva Chen as judges. Filming wrapped in May 2019.

The series was created and produced by theoldschool and executive produced by Robin Ashbrook and Yasmin Shackleton with co-executive producer Adam Cooper.

According to an interview with PinkNews, Chung and France met at a Victoria Beckham party during London Fashion Week. France had already signed onto Next in Fashion and mentioned the role to Chung, who was "too drunk to realise" at the time.

In a statement to Variety, Netflix's vice president of unscripted originals and comedy specials Brandon Riegg explained why it made sense for the company to venture into the fashion competition series category:

Fashion is something that is really appealing and relatable, and so it made sense for us to get into that space considering our viewers around the world ... It is also an opportunity to gauge the fashion enthusiasm of fans and showcase some amazing talent and stories [from designers], the struggles and the victories, and help them elevate their own brand to the next level through the show.

Riegg also discussed the importance of the show's global casting:

“One of the core tenets of our approach to programming is having diversity, and diversity comes in lots of different forms; obviously we are a global platform ... But really it came to finding great characters with great story, and who are credible in the fashion space. And that was a big driver in terms of the casting. It just happened that we looked everywhere in looking for those qualities in the contestants and it allowed us to have more of a global group of contestants for this series in particular.”

== Season 1 ==
=== Designers ===
Source: Radio Times

| Name | Country | Placement |
|---|---|---|
| Nasheli Ortiz-Gonzalez | Puerto Rico | 17th/18th |
| Isaac Saqib | United States | 17th/18th |
| Narresh Kukreja | India | 15th/16th |
| Lorena Saravia Butcher | Mexico | 15th/16th |
| Julian Woodhouse | United States | 13th/14th |
| Hayley Scanlan | Scotland | 13th/14th |
| Kiki Milele | United States | 11th/12th |
| Farai Simoyi | United States | 11th/12th |
| Claire Davis | England | 9th/10th |
| Adolfo Sanchez | United States | 9th/10th |
| Carli Pearson | England | 7th/8th |
| Angelo Cruciani | Italy | 7th/8th |
| Marco Morante | United States | 5th/6th |
| Charles Lu | Canada | 5th/6th |
| Ashton Michael | United States | 3rd/4th |
| Angel Chen | China | 3rd/4th |
| Daniel W. Fletcher | England | 2nd |
| Minju Kim | South Korea | Winner |

=== Designer progress ===
| Designer | Episodes | | | | | | | | | |
| Designer | 1 | 2 | 3 | 4^{[a]} | 5 | 6 | 7 | 8 | 9 | 10 |
|---|---|---|---|---|---|---|---|---|---|---|
| Minju | HIGH | WIN | SAFE | WIN | BTM | BTM | HIGH | HIGH | SAFE | Winner |
| Daniel | HIGH | LOW | WIN | LOW | HIGH | WIN | WIN | BTM | SAFE | Runner-Up |
| Angel | HIGH | WIN | SAFE | WIN | BTM | BTM | LOW | WIN | ELIM | |
| Ashton | SAFE | BTM | HIGH | HIGH | WIN | HIGH | BTM | SAFE | ELIM | |
| Charles | WIN | SAFE | HIGH | HIGH | HIGH | HIGH | HIGH | ELIM | | |
| Marco | SAFE | BTM | HIGH | HIGH | WIN | HIGH | LOW | ELIM | | |
| Angelo | WIN | SAFE | HIGH | HIGH | HIGH | HIGH | ELIM | | | |
| Carli | HIGH | LOW | WIN | LOW | HIGH | WIN | ELIM | | | |
| Adolfo | SAFE | SAFE | LOW | BTM | LOW | ELIM | | | | |
| Claire | SAFE | SAFE | LOW | BTM | LOW | ELIM | | | | |
| Farai | BTM | HIGH | BTM | BTM | ELIM | | | | | |
| Kiki | BTM | HIGH | BTM | BTM | ELIM | | | | | |
| Hayley | LOW | HIGH | ELIM | | | | | | | |
| Julian | LOW | HIGH | ELIM | | | | | | | |
| Lorena | SAFE | ELIM | | | | | | | | |
| Narresh | SAFE | ELIM | | | | | | | | |
| Isaac | ELIM | | | | | | | | | |
| Nasheli | ELIM | | | | | | | | | |

^{[a]}Because the judges were unable to agree, no one was eliminated in this challenge.

The designer won Next in Fashion Season 1.
The designer was runner-up for Next in Fashion Season 1.
The designer advanced to the Finale.
The designer/design team won the challenge.
The designer/design team was considered to win the challenge, and was ultimately safe.
The designer/design team was considered for the bottom, but was ultimately safe.
The designer/design team was in the bottom, but was not eliminated.
The designer lost and was eliminated from the competition.

== Season 2 ==
=== Designers ===
Source: Netflix.com

| Name | City | Placement |
|---|---|---|
| Usama Ishtay | Los Angeles, California | 12th |
| Courtney Smith | New York City, New York | 11th |
| Qaysean Williams | Trenton, New Jersey | 10th |
| Eliana Batsakis | Cincinnati, Ohio | 9th |
| James Ford | Los Angeles, California | 8th/7th |
| Danny Godoy | Inglewood, California | 8th/7th |
| Megan O’Cain | New York City, New York | 6th |
| Desyrée Nicole | Waterford, Michigan | 5th |
| Amari Carter | Atlanta, Georgia | 4th |
| Deontré Hancock | Washington, D.C. | 3rd/2nd |
| Bao Tranchi | Los Angeles, California | 3rd/2nd |
| Nigel Xavier | Atlanta, Georgia | Winner |

=== Designer progress ===
| Designer | Episodes | | | | | | | | | |
| Designer | 1 | 2 | 3 | 4 | 5 | 6^{[b]} | 7 | 8 | 9 | 10 |
|---|---|---|---|---|---|---|---|---|---|---|
| Nigel | SAFE | SAFE | WIN | SAFE | WIN | SAFE | SAFE | SAFE | SAFE | Winner |
| Bao | SAFE | WIN | SAFE | SAFE | SAFE | SAFE | SAFE | WIN | SAFE | Runner-Up |
| Deontré | WIN | SAFE | WIN | SAFE | SAFE | SAFE | SAFE | SAFE | SAFE | Runner-Up |
| Amari | SAFE | WIN | SAFE | SAFE | WIN | SAFE | WIN | SAFE | ELIM | |
| Desyrée | SAFE | SAFE | SAFE | SAFE | SAFE | WIN | WIN | ELIM | | |
| Megan | SAFE | WIN | SAFE | SAFE | SAFE | SAFE | ELIM | | | |
| James | SAFE | WIN | SAFE | SAFE | ELIM | | | | | |
| Godoy | SAFE | WIN | SAFE | WIN | ELIM | | | | | |
| Eliana | SAFE | SAFE | SAFE | ELIM | | | | | | |
| Qaysean | SAFE | SAFE | ELIM | | | | | | | |
| Courtney | SAFE | ELIM | | | | | | | | |
| Usama | ELIM | | | | | | | | | |

^{[b]}The hosts decided not to eliminate a contestant in this episode.

The designer won Next in Fashion Season 2.
The designer was Runner-up for Next in Fashion Season 2.
The designer/design team won the challenge.
The designer lost and was eliminated from the competition.

== Episodes ==
The contestants are shown in a modern warehouse space that serves as both the workroom, and on show days, a runway space complete with area for hair and makeup stations. A fully-stocked fabrics and notions “closet” is adapted for each challenge, and producers will get any item that is needed outside of the supplies provided.

Alexa Chung and Tan France serve as both hosts and judges, with two or three more judges for each challenge. In season two, Gigi Hadid replaces Alexa Chung as co-host alongside Tan France. In each episode the hosts reveal the theme and introduce the guest judge. The designers then each occupy a large work table, and pull fabrics and supplies. The bulk of the pre-runway show is an overview of the contestants' designing and construction process, typically over two work days.

The runway contest itself has a catwalk, and fully digitized floors and walls. During the show the judges' comments are overheard; following the catwalk show the judges visit each entry, inspect the work, and ask questions of the designer. Following the judges' deliberations, the winner and bottom two entries are revealed. After more discussion one or more designers are eliminated.

Season one episodes were posted for streaming January 29, 2020.

Series overview
| Season | Episodes | Originally released |
|---|---|---|
| 1 | 10 | January 29, 2020 |
| 2 | 10 | March 3, 2023 |

=== Season 1 (2020) ===
| No. overall | No. in season | Title | Original release date |
|---|---|---|---|
| 1 | 1 | "Red Carpet" | January 29, 2020 |
The 18 designers pair up to create a red carpet runway look in two days. Helping judge are Instagram’s Eva Chen and celebrity stylist Elizabeth Stewart.: Guest judge: Monique Lhuillier.; Winners: Angelo Cruciani and Charles Lu; Eliminated: Isaac Saqib and Nasheli Ortiz-Gonzalez
| 2 | 2 | "Prints & Patterns" | January 29, 2020 |
The teams are challenged to create with prints and patterns, including creating their own if they wish. They are given a day and a half and need to outfit both a female and male model. Celebrity stylist Elizabeth Stewart returns to help the judges.: Guest judge: Prabal Gurung; Winners: Angel Chen and Minju Kim; Eliminated: Lorena Saravia Butcher and Narresh Kukreja
| 3 | 3 | "The Suit" | January 29, 2020 |
The teams are tasked with creating a chic suit in a day and a half. Helping judge is celebrity stylist Jason Bolden.: Guest judge: Phillip Lim; Winners: Carli Pearson and Daniel Fletcher; Eliminated: Hayley Scanlan and Julian Woodhouse
| 4 | 4 | "Streetwear" | January 29, 2020 |
The remaining designer teams are tasked with creating streetwear.The teams have a day and a half to create two looks, one for a female model and one for a male model. Celebrity stylist Jason Bolden returns to help the judges.: Guest judge: American designer Kerby Jean-Raymond of Pyer Moss; Winners: Angel Chen and Minju Kim; Eliminated: No one. Unlike previous eliminations that had been unanimous, this one had the judges split so the decision was to start over with the next challenge.
| 5 | 5 | "Underwear" | January 29, 2020 |
The remaining teams tackle underwear/lingerie, a multi-billion dollar industry. Each team must create two looks, for a female and a male model. Celebrity stylist Elizabeth Stewart returns to help the judges.: Guest judge: supermodel Adriana Lima; Winners: Marco Morante, and Ashton Hirota; Eliminated: Farai Simoyi-Agbede and Kianga 'Kiki' Milele
| 6 | 6 | "Rock" | January 29, 2020 |
The designer teams face off in a rock and roll theme, which covers a multitude of music genres and attitudes; the judges are looking for designs that harness that energy and offer the unexpected. The teams again have a day and a half to complete two looks, one for a female model and one for a male model. Celebrity stylist Elizabeth Stewart returns to help the judges.: Guest judge: Christopher Kane, joined by Beth Ditto; Winners: Carli Pearson, and Daniel Fletcher; Eliminated: Adolfo Sanchez and Claire Davis; After the winning and losing results are announced, the remaining four teams are told that they will be split up as individuals.
| 7 | 7 | "Activewear" | January 29, 2020 |
The eight individual designers’ next challenge is activewear, judges will be looking for both functionality and fashion appeal. Contestants can create an outfit for either a male or female. Celebrity stylist Elizabeth Stewart returns to help the judges.: Guest judge: Josefine Aberg, designer at Adidas; Winner: Daniel Fletcher; Eliminated: Carli Pearson and Angelo Cruciani
| 8 | 8 | "Military" | January 29, 2020 |
The six remaining designers are challenged with producing a military-themed garment. Military clothing has had an undeniable impact on fashion, inspiring garments such as bomber jackets, cargo pants, jump suits and camouflage and the judges asked the contestants to pull inspiration from military uniforms in a way that honours its intended purpose but still makes it fashion. Celebrity stylist Elizabeth Stewart returns to help judge.: Guest judges: Maxwell Osborne and Dao-Yi Chow, designers at Public School.; Winner: Angel Chen; Eliminated: Charles Lu and Marco Morante
| 9 | 9 | "Denim" | January 29, 2020 |
For the semi-final, the remaining four designers are faced with a denim challenge. Denim is one of the most worn fabrics in the world, and makes arguably the most personal statement, being fashioned into everyday wear, work clothes and more. The designers are each asked to present two denim looks which must work with each other, and each designer has one male and one female model. Denim has unique challenges in getting the cut correct, and also in trying to present something the judges have not already seen. Celebrity stylist Elizabeth Stewart returns to help judge the designs.: Guest judge: Tommy Hilfiger; Winners: Daniel Fletcher and Minju Kim; Eliminated: Angel Chen and Ashton Hirota
| 10 | 10 | "The Finale" | January 29, 2020 |
For the Grand Finale the last two designers are to show the judges everything they have to offer as they complete a full ten-piece collection in three days. Each designer is allotted a team of three sewers each work day who cannot consult on creative items. They are also advised that the tenth look should be an impressive show-stopper. As a bonus, they are surprised by family members flown in for the finale. Daniel Fletcher uses the Bright Young Things as his inspiration; they were Bohemian aristocrats and socialites in 1920s London who threw elaborate fancy dress parties. Minju Kim's inspiration is Frida Kahlo, a painter known for her many portraits, self-portraits, and works inspired by her home country of Mexico.: Guest judges: Eva Chen, head of fashion partnerships for Instagram; celebrity stylist Elizabeth Stewart; Elizabeth von der Goltz, global buying director for Net-a-Porter.; Next in Fashion winner: Minju Kim

=== Season 2 (2023) ===
| No. overall | No. in season | Title | Original release date |
|---|---|---|---|
| 11 | 1 | "Royalty" | March 3, 2023 |
Twelve designers settle into the workroom to create royalty-inspired looks, hoping to be crowned the winner by fashion industry icon Donatella Versace.
| 12 | 2 | "Wear The Earth" | March 3, 2023 |
Two teams let their imaginations bloom to make living looks that incorporate flowers and plants for supermodel judge Helena Christensen.
| 13 | 3 | "Thrift Wear" | March 3, 2023 |
In a whirlwind challenge, designers have only four hours to craft fresh designs from thrifted pieces. Internet personality Emma Chamberlain guest judges.
| 14 | 4 | "Childhood" | March 3, 2023 |
Producing grown-up looks inspired by their childhood photos proves emotional for some contestants in a challenge judged by designer Isabel Marant.
| 15 | 5 | "Collaboration" | March 3, 2023 |
The designers pair up to wow Balmain's Olivier Rousteing with coordinated looks, and learn that creative chemistry can make or break a collaboration.
| 16 | 6 | "Met Gala" | March 3, 2023 |
Riffing on the theme of camp, the designers create over-the-top ensembles worthy of a Met Gala red carpet for guest judge Bella Hadid.
| 17 | 7 | "Swimwear" | March 3, 2023 |
Pairs of contestants dive into a rapid-fire swimwear challenge to create two suits that will impress model and designer Candice Swanepoel.
| 18 | 8 | "Everything Old Is New" | March 3, 2023 |
Tan and Gigi fire up their time machine, sending designers to past decades to find retro inspiration for contemporary looks. Hailey Bieber judges.
| 19 | 9 | "Transformation" | March 3, 2023 |
The final four pull out all the stops to design two-in-one pieces that can transform in an instant, with actor Ashley Park of "Emily in Paris" judging.
| 20 | 10 | "The Finale" | March 3, 2023 |
Three finalists have a chance to showcase their artistry and talent with a full collection of new styles - but only one can walk off the runway a winner.

== See also ==
- Making the Cut
- Styling Hollywood
