= Minju =

Minju may refer to:

- Min opera, a Chinese opera genre from Fujian
- Minju Party (disambiguation), Korean political parties
- Min-ju, Korean given name
- Kim Min-ju, South Korean actress and singer
- Park Min-ju, South Korean singer and member of South Korean girl group ILLIT
