= Angel Chen =

Chinese fashion designer

Angel Chen (born 1991) is a Chinese fashion designer known for her colorful approach to fashion and fusion of Eastern and Western aesthetics. She was on Netflix's Next in Fashion Season 1, where she partnered with Minju Kim.

== Early life and education ==
Chen is originally from Shenzhen, China. At 17, she moved to London to study fashion design at the prestigious Central Saint Martins. She interned for Marchesa, Vera Wang, and Alexander Wang in New York during her placement year. Following her graduate collection, Chen was chosen by i-D as one of five designers to watch in 2014.

== Career ==
In 2014, Chen founded her namesake ready-to-wear fashion line, Angel Chen, in Shanghai. In 2015, she launched her first spring and summer collection, “The Rite of Spring,” where she used bold colors and eccentric weaving and won the coveted “Fashion Scout Ones to Watch” award.

Since 2017, Chen has been on the official Milan Fashion Week calendar and boasts collaborations with Western brands such as H&M, Adidas Originals, McDonald's, Canada Goose, Swarovski, and M.A.C Cosmetics in 2019.

In 2020, Chen participated in the Netflix series Next in Fashion, hosted by Alexa Chung and Tan France. From the first episode, she partnered with Minju Kim and called themselves "Dragon Princess."

In 2021, Chen successfully entered the global market and became one of the most influential young Chinese fashion brands. Her creations are featured in numerous stores in China and on about a hundred internationally renowned e-commerce platforms, including Lane Crawford, NET-A-PORTER, Galeries Lafayette, Selfridges, Luisaviaroma, and Urban Outfitters.

In 2023, Chen partnered with Johnnie Walker and released a limited-edition bottle design for its premium Johnnie Walker Blue Label, and with Nespresso for a limited-edition Lunar New Year “Patchwork Rabbit” collection commemorating the Year of the Rabbit.

She has also worked with celebrities, including Chris Lee, Bella Hadid, Kris Wu, Fan Bingbing, and Charli XCX.

== Awards ==
Chen joined Forbes China's “30 under 30” in 2016 and the Business of Fashion 500 in 2017 and 2018. She is also a Woolmark prize finalist and the first-ever Chinese designer to collaborate with H&M.
