= Spirit Guardians: The Last Secret of the First Emperor =

2026 Vietnamese adventure-action film

- Vietnamese: Hộ Linh Tráng Sĩ: Bí Ẩn Mộ Vua Đinh
- Directed by: Nguyễn Phan Quang Bình
- Written by: Nguyễn Phan Quang Bình; Manh Tung Lam; Vinh Hoang Ngo
- Produced by: Thi Bich Hanh Ngo
- Starring: Johnny Trí Nguyễn; Tuấn Trần; Tự Long; Trần Thiên Tú; Đỗ Thị Hải Yến
- Cinematography: Nguyễn K'Linh
- Edited by: Steve M. Choe; Go Bong-gon
- Music by: Quốc Trung
- Production companies: BHD; TV360
- Release dates: 28 August 2026 (Vietnam); 18 September 2026 (TIFF)
- Running time: 135 minutes
- Country: Vietnam
- Language: Vietnamese
- Budget: ₫100,000,000,000
- Box office: ₫38,400,000,000

Spirit Guardians: The Last Secret of the First Emperor (Vietnamese: Hộ Linh Tráng Sĩ: Bí Ẩn Mộ Vua Đinh) is a 2026 Vietnamese historical adventure-action film directed by Nguyễn Phan Quang Bình, co-written with Manh Tung Lam and Vinh Hoang Ngo. Set in the Đinh dynasty of the 10th century, it stars Johnny Trí Nguyễn, Tuấn Trần, Tự Long, Trần Thiên Tú, and Đỗ Thị Hải Yến.

The film was theatrically released in Vietnam on 28 August 2026. It had its international premiere at the 2026 Toronto International Film Festival on 18 September. It was also selected as the Vietnamese entry for Best International Feature Film at the 99th Academy Awards.

== Plot ==
Following the death of Đinh Bộ Lĩnh, seven warriors tasked with transporting the late emperor's body use 99 decoys to prevent their enemies from discovering the emperor's final resting place.

== Cast ==
- Johnny Trí Nguyễn as General Ứng Long
- Tuấn Trần as Nguyên Phong
- Tự Long as Cun, a Mường shaman
- Trần Thiên Tú as An Nhiên
- Đỗ Thị Hải Yến as Empress Dương.
- Lê Vũ Long as Emperor Đinh Tiên
- Quách Ngọc Ngoan as General Định Viễn
- Lê Minh Thuấn as Chief Eunuch
- Hứa Vĩ Văn as Bạch Hạc, an official
- Đăng Trần as Warrior of the Waterways
- Diệp Quang Bình as a urrendered general.

== Production ==
In addition to starring in the film, Johnny Tri Nguyen served as action director and oversaw a team of more than 100 professional stunt performers. Fashion designer Bao Tranchi was in charge of the film's costuming, alongside Vietnamese artists Mai Lâm, Dai Viet Vo Bi, and Binh Khi Viet. Filming wrapped in January 2026 after 83 days, with 40 large-scale sets constructed throughought the UNESCO World Heritage Site of Tràng An in Ninh Bình province. BHD and Viettel's TV360 backed the film's production. Director Nguyễn Phan Quang Bình acknowledged using generative AI to develop the film's script.

== Release ==
The film was theatrically released in Vietnam on 28 August 2026 in order to coincide with Vietnam's National Day. It had its international premiere in the Gala Presentations section of the 2026 Toronto International Film Festival on 18 September. It was also selected for the 31st Busan International Film Festival.

Papaian Studios, a faith-based media company from Fort Worth, Texas, purchased the North American and South American rights to the film, per a June 2026 article from Deadline. In October 2026, US-based distributor 3388 Films acquired rights for theatrical distribution of the film's global release.

== Reception ==
Following the Toronto International Film Festival, a review published in The Varsity labeled the film "a confusing failure of an adaptation," highlighting historical inaccuracies and levying particular criticism on the film's use of AI in the screenwriting process. Panos Kotzathanasis, writing for Asian Movie Pulse, called the film "among the most ambitious productions ever mounted in Vietnamese cinema" and praised the film's design, choreography, and acting while criticizing the film's writing and overall pacing.

After one month in theaters, the film grossed ₫38,400,000,000; with an estimated budget of ₫100,000,000,000, the film significantly underperformed expectations at the box office.

== See also ==
- List of submissions to the 99th Academy Awards for Best International Feature Film
- List of Vietnamese submissions for the Academy Award for Best International Feature Film
