= Min-ju =

- Hangul: 민주
- RR: Minju
- MR: Minju

Min-ju, also spelled Min-joo, is a Korean given name.

People with this name include:

- Minju Kim (born 1986), South Korean fashion designer
- Joo (singer) (born Jun Min-joo, 1990), South Korean singer
- Kim Min-ju (born 2001), South Korean actress
- Park Minju (born 2004), South Korean K-pop singer from Illit

== See also ==
- List of Korean given names
