= Dressing Funny =

- Genre: Makeover reality Comedy
- Starring: Tan France
- Country of origin: United States
- Original language: English
- No. of seasons: 2
- No. of episodes: 9

Production
- Running time: 10–12 minutes
- Production company: Netflix

Original release
- Network: YouTube
- Release: June 21, 2019 – January 16, 2020

Dressing Funny is an American web series talk show hosted by Tan France. It streams on Netflix' YouTube channel, Netflix Is a Joke. The series premiered on June 21, 2019.

The series won The Webby People's Voice award as best variety program in May 2020.

== Episodes ==
Season	Episodes	Originally released	
Season	Episodes	First released	Last released
1	6	June 21, 2019	July 18, 2019
2	3	December 3, 2019	January 16, 2020

=== Season 1 (2019) ===
No. overall	No. in season	Title	Guest(s)	Original release date
1	1	"Tan France Gives John Mulaney a Hypebeast Makeover"	John Mulaney	June 21, 2019
2	2	"Tan France Makeover of Big Mouth's Nick Kroll & Andrew Goldberg"	Nick Kroll & Andrew Goldberg	June 24, 2019
3	3	"Tan France Gives Ali Wong A Movie Star Makeover"	Ali Wong	June 27, 2019
4	4	"Tan France and Miranda Sings Almost Get Married"	Miranda Sings	July 3, 2019
5	5	"Tan France & Tina Fey Give Rachel Dratch an Ariana Grande Look"	Tina Fey & Rachel Dratch	July 12, 2019
6	6	"Tan France Gives Pete Davidson a John Mulaney Makeover"	Pete Davidson	July 18, 2019

=== Season 2 (2019–20) ===
No. overall	No. in season	Title	Guest(s)	Original release date
7	1	"Tan France Gives Tiffany Haddish A Lil Kim Makeover"	Tiffany Haddish	December 3, 2019
8	2	"Jo Koy Bets Tan France $20 That He Can't Wear Stripes"	Jo Koy	December 14, 2019
9	3	"Tan France Gives Gabriel Iglesias An Anti-Fluffy Makeover"	Gabriel Iglesias	January 16, 2020
