= Marco Morante =

American fashion designer (born 1979)

- Born: June 6, 1979 (age 47); Massachusetts, U.S.
- Education: Aliso Niguel High School; California Institute of the Arts
- Occupation: Fashion designer
- Partner: Chris Psaila
- Website: www.marcomarco.com

Marco Morante (born June 6, 1979) is an American fashion designer, best known for his dressing of numerous entertainment personalities for television, concerts, and live stage shows. He has designed for Fergie, Katy Perry, Nicki Minaj, Ke$ha, Britney Spears, and Shakira, as well as various drag queens who have competed on RuPaul's Drag Race. Morante co-owns the Hollywood-based fashion design studio Marco Marco with his partner Chris Psaila.

== Personal life ==
Morante was born to a Puerto Rican mother and a Dominican and Ecuadorian father in Massachusetts. When he was two years old, his family moved to California.

== Career and artistry ==
" Visibility is so important, but often diversity in the mainstream can seem tokenistic, I wanted to create a space to celebrate trans bodies. This was an opportunity for their presence to be undeniable and reinforce that #transisbeautiful"

— Morante on his decision to host a trans-only fashion show

In 2002, Morante graduated from the California Institute of the Arts with a double Bachelor of Fine Arts degree in Theatrical Design, with an emphasis on both Costume and Scenic Design. Later that year, Morante co-founded his eponymous fashion design studio Marco Marco with his partner Chris Psaila after meeting as students.

In 2018, Morante's fashion label Marco Marco was the second (after Gogo Graham) to host a runway show at New York Fashion Week with only trans and gender non-conforming models for his Spring Summer 2019 show. This show also made history for having the most trans men ever assembled on a New York Fashion Week runway.

In 2020, Morante competed on the first season of Netflix's fashion design competition series Next in Fashion, where he placed 5th.

In 2022, Morante won an Emmy award for his sartorial contributions to HBO's We're Here. In 2023, he won his second Emmy award for his work on We're Here.

Morante is inspired by William Travilla, Edith Head, Eiko, Paco Rabanne, Issey Miyake, and Iris Van Herpen.

== Awards and nominations ==
=== Costume Designers Guild Awards ===
The Costume Designers Guild Awards are awarded annually by the Costume Designers Guild for costume designers in motion pictures, television, and commercials. Morante has received 1 nomination.

Year	Nominated work	Award	Result
2025	We're Here	Excellence in Variety, Reality-Competition, or Live Television	Nominated

=== Emmy Awards ===
The Emmy Awards are presented at one of the numerous annual American events or competitions that each recognize achievements in a particular sector of the television industry. Morante has received 2 awards from 2 nominations.

Year	Nominated work	Award	Result
2022	We're Here	Outstanding Costumes for a Variety, Nonfiction, or Reality Programming	Won (Note: as part of Marco Marco)
2023	We're Here	Outstanding Costumes for a Variety, Nonfiction, or Reality Programming	Won

=== Lucille Lortel Awards ===
The Lucille Lortel Awards are awarded annually to recognize excellence in New York Off-Broadway theatre. Morante has received 1 nomination.

Year	Nominated work	Award	Result
2025	Drag: The Musical	Outstanding Costume Design	Nominated
