= Ashton Michael =

American fashion designer

- Born: 4 July 1982 (age 44); Los Angeles, California
- Other name: Ashton Hirota
- Education: Fashion Institute of Design and Merchandising
- Labels: Ashton Michael; ASH by Ashton Michael

Ashton Michael (born July 4, 1982) is an American fashion designer and celebrity wardrobe stylist based in Los Angeles.

== Career ==
In 2002, at age 19 Ashton started his first company with Marina Toybina called GLAZA. His own label Ashton Michael was formed in 2005.

In 2010, Ashton showcased a green collection for NYFW. The spring collection was a collaboration with Rethink Sustainable Solutions Group. All fabrics used to produce the collection were made from recycled water bottles, bamboo, and coconut.

In 2013, Ashton went to the East Coast to show his fall/winter 13 collection at Style 360 presented by Elle Magazine.

In October 2013, Ashton shut down the streets of Hollywood and built a runway in the middle of it for his show during LA Fashion Week for his spring/summer 2014 collection, Black Cross. Ashton Michael combined his black and white color palette, East LA street style and Hasidic Orthodox Jewish references as inspiration for the collection.

"ASH by Ashton Michael" is a ready-to-wear diffusion line launched by Ashton Michael in 2020.

In 2015, Ashton Michael created a black and pink army for Beyoncé & Nicki Minaj TIDAL performance.

In 2023, Ashton Michael celebrated his 10-year anniversary in Hollywood with a runway show titled "Punk-Tsugi." The collection blends grunge aesthetics with luxury and pays homage to friends lost. Known for his celebrity clientele, Michael's designs feature 3D-printed elements and distressed materials, with his first runway show in six years marking a significant milestone. The event showcased his personal and creative growth.

In 2024, Avril Lavigne highlights working with designer Ashton Michael on her stage looks for the "Greatest Hits" tour. She praises Michael's ability to bring her vision to life, using Pinterest to gather inspiration for edgy, personalized outfits. Michael's punk influence shines through in her performances, helping Lavigne stay true to her iconic style while staying fresh.

Ashton Michael has designed for numerous celebrities including Adam Lambert, Will.i.am, Usher, Nicki Minaj, Cher, Justin Bieber, Pitbull, Samuel Larsen, and Lizzo

Ashton Michael works from Hollywood, California.

== Television appearances ==
In 2013, Ashton Michael appeared as a guest judge on America's Next Top Model and RuPaul's Drag U. Ashton also appeared as a makeover consultant on the E! show Opening Act.

Released in 2020, Ashton Michael appeared as a contestant on the first season of the Netflix reality show and fashion design competition Next In Fashion. During the team portion of the program, he collaborated with Marco Morante of the brand Marco Marco, fellow LA-based designer and long-time friend. Ashton was eliminated in the semifinal of the competition.
