= Farai Simoyi =

British–Zimbabwean fashion designer

- Born: 1 October 1983 (age 42); London, United Kingdom
- Education: West Virginia University, USA
- Occupations: Fashion Designer; Television personality; Entrepreneur
- Known for: Fashion design
- Television: I've Got Nothing to Wear, Fashion Designer/Participant in Netflix's Next in Fashion
- Website: https://www.faraisimoyi.com

Farai Simoyi (born 1983) is a British–Zimbabwean fashion designer, television personality, educator, and entrepreneur. She appeared on the first edition of the fashion design competition series Next in Fashion in 2020.

== Early life ==
Farai Simoyi was born on 1 October 1983 in London, England. She lived her early childhood in Harare, Zimbabwe, where she attended early primary education at Groombridge Primary School before moving to West Virginia in the United States of America. She completed her primary and secondary education in the USA before proceeding to West Virginia University. She attained her Fashion Design & Merchandising degree at West Virginia University and studied design at Nuova Accademia di Belle Arti in Milan, Italy.

== Career ==
Farai Simoyi began her career in fashion design in 2005. Over the years she rose to prominence through designing and consulting for celebrity brands, which include Beyonce, Jay-Z, Nicki Minaj, Justin Timberlake, Rachel Roy, Anne Klein, and Robert Rodriguez.

In 2010 she debuted her brand Farai Inc at New York Fashion Week 2010, where she was identified as a ‘Breakout Designer’ by Time Out New York, She then went on to establish The Narativ House in 2017 which houses ethically sourced artisan brands from around the world with an emphasis on sustainability and traditional craftsmanship through human-centered design including partnerships with W Hotels, Vice Media, Refinery29, and Afropunk.

In 2024, Simoyi joined the Fashion Scholarship Fund as the inaugural Head of the Virgil Abloh™ "Post-Modern" Scholarship Fund and Equity. Conceived by visionary fashion designer Virgil Abloh, founder of the Milan-based luxury streetwear brand Off-White and former artistic director of Louis Vuitton's menswear, this initiative continues his legacy of championing diversity in the fashion industry. In this role, Simoyi leads the charge in expanding the program's reach, increasing scholarships awarded each year, and spearheading initiatives that open doors for students from underrepresented communities.

=== Television ===
In 2007, Simoyi had her television debut on TLC’s design competition series I’ve got nothing to wear. In the series, design contestants were paired up with a client that had an entire closet of clothes yet still complained, “I’ve got nothing to wear”. The designers would invade the closets of their clients and pull garments with plans to upcycle them into new, revived garments.

Simoyi's second television appearance was in 2020 when she appeared on the first season of the Netflix fashion design competition series Next in Fashion in 2020. She was the only African on the show which featured eighteen international designers. On the show, Simoyi was partnered with an American fashion designer, Kianga "Kiki" Milele. The two designers worked with each other at The Nicki Minaj Collection. The designers appeared in 5 episodes and exited after the 5th episode.

=== Academia ===
In 2020, Simoyi became the Program Director & Professor of B.S. Fashion Design and M.S. International Fashion Design Management for the Kanbar School of Engineering & Design at Thomas Jefferson University. Simoyi launched one of the first undergraduate 3D Virtual Fashion Design curriculums in Philadelphia, utilizing software such as CLO3D.

=== Volunteering ===
In 2022 Simoyi became a Fashion Scholarship Fund Equity Committee member in partnership with the Virgil Abloh "Post-Modern" Scholarship Fund. The Fashion Scholarship Fund Equity Committee works directly with the country's most talented young students from diverse backgrounds and awards over $1 million each year in scholarships to help students succeed in all industry sectors, including design, merchandising, marketing analytics, and business strategy. Simoyi is also an advisory board member for the Council for International African Fashion Education (CIAFE) representing North America and board member for the Philadelphia Fashion & Garment Industry Task Force (PFGITF).

=== Author ===
In 2024 Farai Simoyi co-authored Dazzling Zelda, a children's nonfiction picture book biography published by Simon & Schuster on August 13, 2024. The book introduces young readers to Black fashion icon and design pioneer Zelda Wynn Valdes, whose elegant dresses, gowns, and costumes illuminated the stage and red carpet, shaping fashion history.

== Awards and recognition ==
- Alumni Service Award and Homecoming Grand Marshal, 2023
- Mi Daakye Barrier Breaker Award, 2023
- The Next Best Designer – Essence list of 2020
- Female Entrepreneur of the year – Zimbabwe Achievers Awards USA 2018
- GC4W 20 Most Influential African Women Entrepreneurs & Leaders in America 2016
- GC4W Top 100 Women in the World
- Influential African Women To Watch – Ladybrille Magazine 2016
- Designer of the year – African Entertainment Awards USA
- Emerging Designer of the Year – African Diaspora Awards 2012

=== Notable positions ===
- Senior Designer – Nicki Minaj Collection 2013–2016
- Head Denim & Woven's Designer – Beyonce, House of Deréon 2007 – 2010
- Curator at NYNow Fashion Runway 2019
- Fashion Contributor – Start by WGSN 2020
