= Usama Ishtay =

Venezuelan fashion

- Born: June 18, 1988 (age 37); Guárico, Venezuela
- Occupation: Fashion designer
- Website: www.usamaishtay.com

Usama Ishtay (born June 18, 1988, Guárico, Venezuela) is a Syrian-Venezuelan fashion designer based in Los Angeles, US. He is notable for working with actresses such as Tyra Banks, Carrie Underwood, Lauren London, and Chiquis Rivera.

== Early life and education ==
Ishtay was born in Guárico, Venezuela, on June 18, 1988, to a Syrian immigrant family. He was raised in Zulia. He graduated from college with a bachelor's degree in petroleum engineering and a master's in geology in 2010 and 2012, respectively.

== Career ==
After his first trip to the United States, Ishtay three boutiques in Venezuela, which were later lost due to the country's political and economic crisis. Afterwards, he permanently moved to Los Angeles, US.

Ishtay studied pattern making and sewing privately and also made a living driving Uber. In 2016, he did an internship at Los Angeles Fashion Week. At the Autism Speaks event, Ishtay designed a dress for American rapper, singer, and actress Eve. Following the event, Ishtay donated her dress to charity.

Ishtay has dressed various actresses, singers, and models, including Tyra Banks, Carrie Underwood, Anitta, Thalia, Chiquis Rivera, Jeannie Mai, Paulina Rubio, Lauren Jauregui, Ariadna Gutiérrez, and Nikita Dragun. Lauren London chose a white, form-fitting design from Ishtay's collection for the 2019 Grammy Awards, while Gaby Espino wore one of his dresses for the Billboard Latin Music Awards in 2020.

Earlier in 2022, the designer dressed rapper Icy Bae (Saweetie) for the latest campaign for firm MAC Cosmetics, in which she starred alongside Cher. Also, in March 2022, he presented his collection at Los Angeles Fashion Week.
