= Bao Tranchi =

Vietnamese American costume and fashion designer

- Born: Saigon, South Vietnam
- Occupations: Costume designer; Fashion designer
- Years active: 2006–present

Bao Tranchi is a Vietnamese American costume and fashion designer. She is best known for her work on films such as Peter Farrelly's The Greatest Beer Run Ever (2022), Dear Santa (2024) starring Jack Black, and K-Pops! (2024) directed by Anderson .Paak.

== Early life ==
Tranchi was born in Saigon, South Vietnam, and emigrated to the United States as a child. She graduated from Otis College of Art and Design in Los Angeles in 1999 with a degree in fashion design.

== Career ==
=== Costume design ===
Tranchi began her career in the film industry as an assistant costume designer. She was one of the youngest members admitted to the Costume Designers Guild. Her early credits include work on films such as Charlie’s Angels (2000) and Hedwig and the Angry Inch (2001). She made her debut as a lead costume designer with the 2006 film Journey from the Fall, directed by Ham Tran, which explored the Vietnamese immigrant experience. She has since designed costumes for numerous projects, including films such as Once Upon a Time in Vietnam (2013) and The Greatest Beer Run Ever (2022).

=== Fashion design ===
In 2015, Tranchi launched her own fashion label, "Bao Tranchi," which is known for its body-conscious designs featuring strategic cutouts. Her work has been showcased in publications like Vogue, Harper's Bazaar, Elle and Women's Wear Daily. Her designs have been worn by celebrities including Jennifer Lopez, Gigi Hadid, Britney Spears, Zendaya, Carrie Underwood, Selena Gomez, Mariah Carey and Nicki Minaj.

=== Other Work ===
Tranchi served as a mentor for Otis College of Art and Design fashion students in 2018–2019. She was a finalist and the second runner-up on the second season of Netflix's reality competition show, Next in Fashion. She has also served as a guest judge on shows like Project Runway and America’s Next Top Model.

== Filmography ==
- 2026 - Spirit Guardians: The Last Secret of the First Emperor
- 2025 - Hijacked
- 2024 - K-Pops!
- 2024 - Dear Santa
- 2022 - The Greatest Beer Run Ever
- 2019 - Finding Julia
- 2013 - Once Upon a Time in Vietnam
- 2012 - Keye Luke
- 2012 - Chinatown Squad
- 2010 - The Prince and the Pagoda Boy
- 2006 - Journey from the Fall
