= Jason Bolden =

American fashion stylist

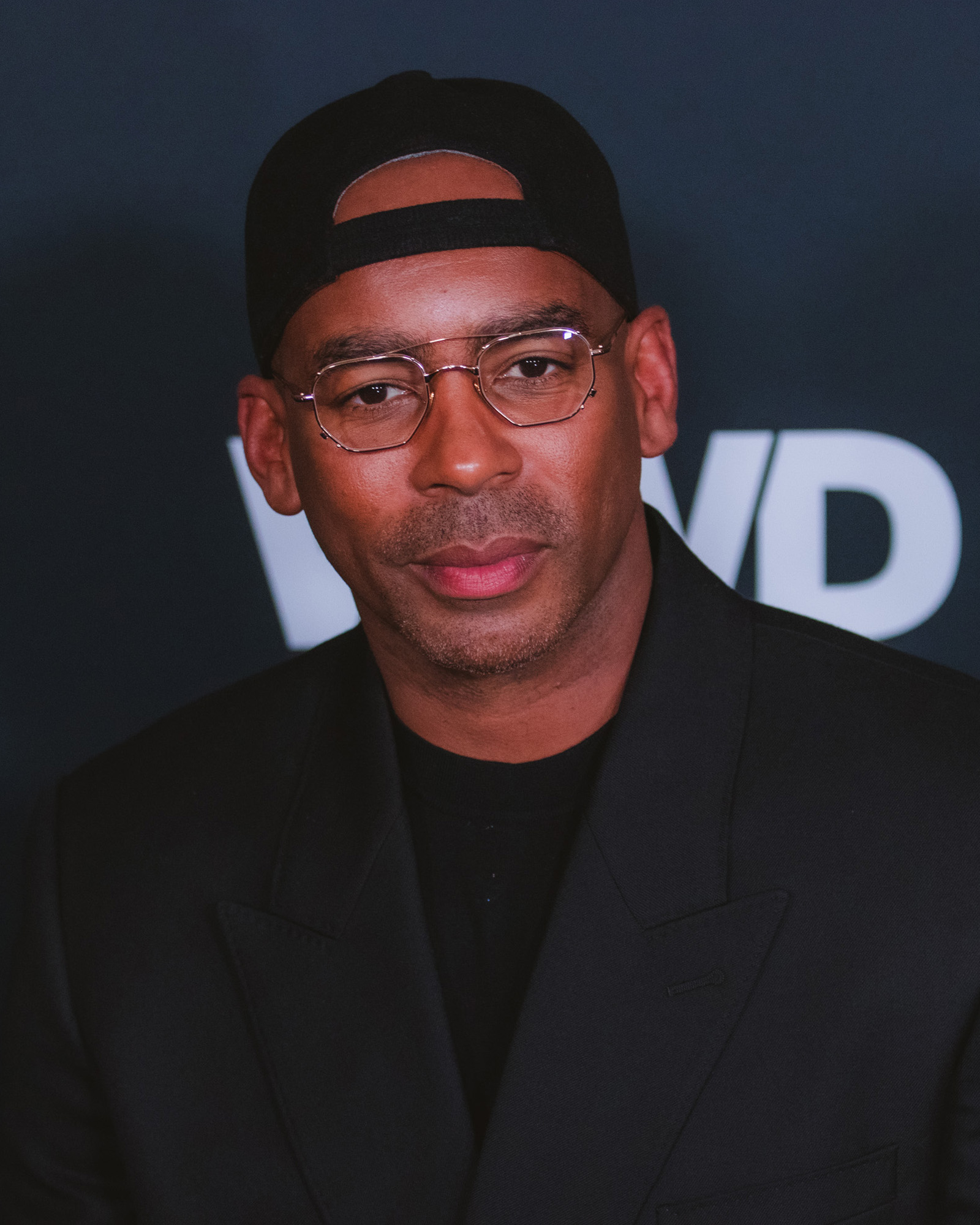
- Bolden in 2026
- Born: February 27, 1982 (age 44)

Jason Bolden (born February 27, 1982) is an American entrepreneur, creative director and fashion stylist. Bolden is a co-founder of JSN Studio, along with his husband, interior designer Adair Curtis.

== Education and early career ==
At age 18, Bolden moved from St. Louis to Chicago to study pre-med at Northwestern University with the goal of becoming an OBGYN. Bolden transferred to Art Institute of Chicago and got a job at a Cynthia Rowley retail store, which solidified his love of clothes. He went on to work for Nicole Miller, Louis Vuitton, Chloé, Gucci, and Oscar de la Renta, where he built his wealthy client base.

After graduating, Bolden moved to New York City and co-founded vintage clothing store, The Garment Room, in SoHo. Calvin Klein, Akris and Ralph Lauren visited Bolden's store to gain inspiration for their new collections.

== Career as celebrity stylist ==
In 2011, Gabrielle Union encouraged Bolden to style her for an Art Basel event. In the early 2010s, Taraji P. Henson informed Bolden she was about to become really popular and thus, Bolden would become in demand as her stylist. This gave Bolden the confidence to launch his full time styling career.

In 2013, Bolden designed a shoe collection in collaboration with Brazilian brand Schutz.

In 2015, Bolden was hired by Rihanna's beauty and stylist agency, Fr8me. In 2016, Bolden released a line of sunglasses under the JSN Studio brand name.

In 2021, Bolden and designer Zac Posen headlined a virtual training program aimed at engaging and empowering diverse youth looking to enter the fashion business. The program was sponsored by New York Fashion Week.

For the 95th annual Academy Awards, Bolden styled Michael B. Jordan, Vanessa Hudgens, and Jay Ellis for the official ceremony, and Jordan, Hudgens, Yara Shahidi, Dwyane Wade, Sabrina Carpenter, DeWanda Wise, and Trevor Noah for the after parties. Bolden began planning the outfits for the events in February 2023. The ceremony and parties took place on March 12, 2023. Bolden's signature of casual luxury was highlighted in all clients' outfits.

Bolden typically does only one or two fittings with clients, within a week's time of an event. He is known for selecting jewelry for looks on the same day an event takes place.

In January 2025, Bolden styled Taylor Zakhar Perez for the Lacoste underwear ad campaign.

In 2025, The Hollywood Reporter named him Stylist of the Year, particularly for his collaboration with Cynthia Erivo for the promotion of Wicked, noting that it "both defined and elevated red carpet method dressing."

In 2026, Bolden won Red Carpet Stylist of the Year at the WWD Style Awards.

== Political views ==
In 2020, Bolden called out French luxury brands Celine and Yves Saint Laurent for performative solidarity with the Black Lives Matter movement, after Bolden and other Black stylists, celebrities, and models faced discrimination from the brands. Bolden is a board member of the Black Fashion and Beauty Council, created to support Black creatives navigating the industry.

In 2021, Booth Moore wrote an article in Women's Wear Daily, criticizing the lack of garments showcased by Black designers at the Golden Globe Awards. Bolden and celebrity stylist Law Roach responded by explaining there's gatekeeping that Black stylists have to overcome in order to have access to certain brands and garments. Roach and Bolden questioned Moore’s logic of expecting Black stylists to correct industry wrongs that were purposely created to oppress Black artists and businesspeople. They stated the responsibility should be on wealthy white and non-Black artists and businesspeople to change the dynamics of the industry.

== Public image ==
In 2012, Bolden's wedding was one of the first Black gay weddings to be broadcast on network television during an episode of VH1's La La's Full Court Life. Bolden is a reoccurring judge on Netflix's Next in Fashion.

In August 2019, Netflix released Styling Hollywood, a show about Bolden's relationship and business with husband and interior designer, Adair Curtis. The show broke barriers, being one of the first television shows to highlight a Black gay married couple. The series spotlighted both successful Black men in the traditionally white-dominated fields of luxury fashion and interior design. In 2022, Bolden and Curtis were honored by Family Equality with the Visibility Award at LA Impact: A Night of Heroes.

== Personal life ==
Bolden's family has always supported his gay identity. Bolden has been outspoken about his positive experience growing up in order to challenge the stereotype of homophobia in Black families.

In 2012, Bolden married interior designer, Adair Curtis.

In 2021, their son, Arrow Fox, was born.

Bolden is an art collector. In 2021, he made a video about his personal collection for Sotheby's. The collection initially included Hermès bags and art pieces by Joan Mitchell, Keith Haring, and Picasso. Bolden cites internalized anti-Blackness for the initial whiteness of his collection. Aryn Drake-Lee opened Bolden up to the significance of Black art and artists, which inspired Bolden to collect only artists of color going forward. Bolden's collection now includes pieces from Kehinde Wiley and Kwame Brathwaite. Bolden is a sneakerhead.

Bolden is Zaya Wade's godfather. When she came out as transgender at age 8, Dwyane Wade and Gabrielle Union-Wade called friends, Bolden and Curtis, to ask for advice on how to support their daughter.
