= Gigi Hadid =

American model (born 1995)

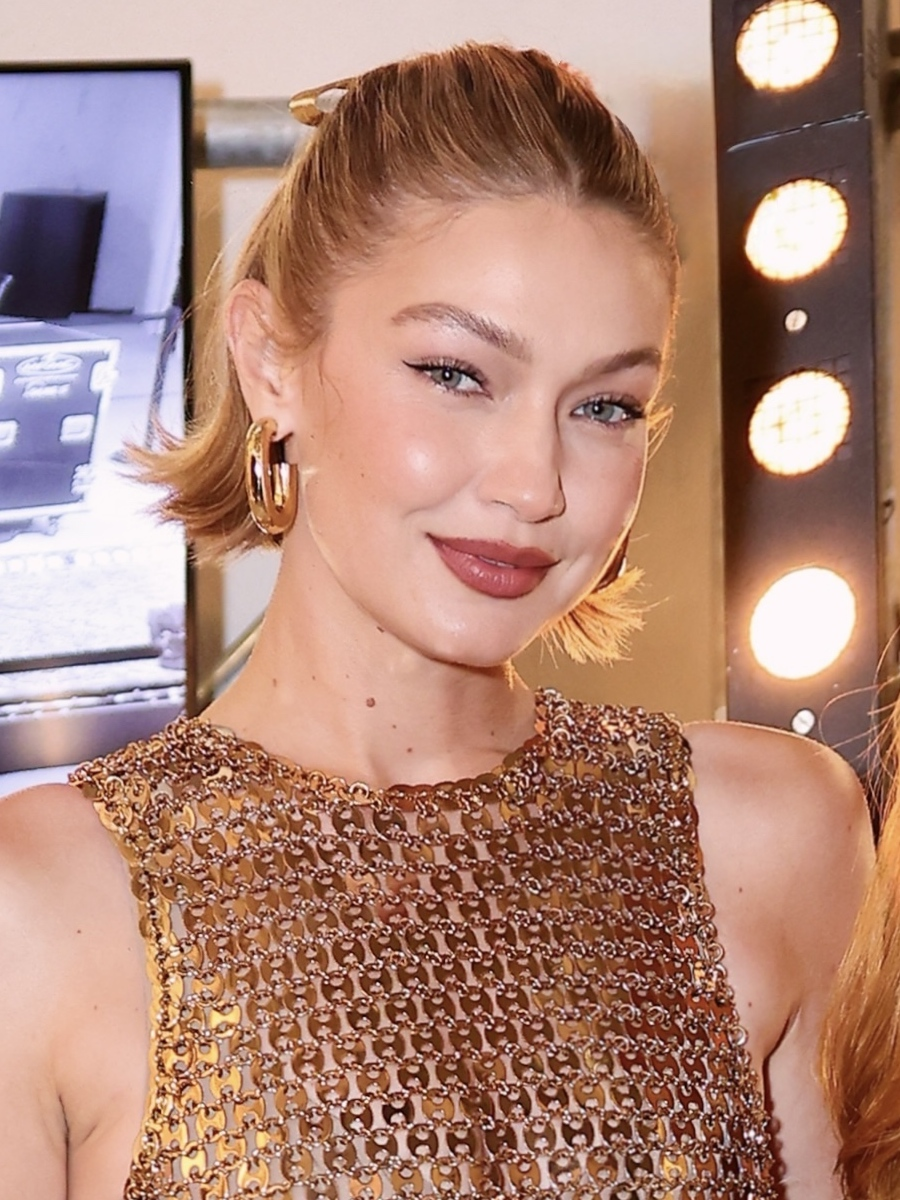
- Hadid in 2025
- Born: Jelena Noura Hadid; April 23, 1995 (age 31); Los Angeles, California, U.S.
- Occupations: Model; television personality
- Years active: 1997–present
- Partner: Zayn Malik (2015–2021)
- Children: 1
- Parents: Mohamed Hadid (father); Yolanda Hadid (mother)
- Relatives: Bella Hadid (sister)
- Modeling information
- Height: 5 ft 11 in (1.80 m)
- Hair color: Blonde
- Eye color: Blue-green
- Agency: IMG Models (New York)

Jelena Noura "Gigi" Hadid (/ˈdʒiːdʒi həˈdiːd/ JEE-jee hə-DEED; born April 23, 1995) is an American fashion model and television personality. In 2016, she was named International Model of the Year by the British Fashion Council. Throughout her career, Hadid has made at least 50 appearances in international Vogue. Models.com ranks her as one of the "New Supers". Since 2017, Hadid has been one of the highest-paid models in the world, earning $20 million.

Born in Los Angeles, Hadid began her career as a child model for Baby Guess. She signed to IMG Models in 2013 and made her New York Fashion Week debut the next year. She has appeared in numerous high fashion campaigns and editorials, and is a spokesmodel for Maybelline.

== Early life ==
Jelena Noura Hadid was born on April 23, 1995, in Los Angeles, California, to Palestinian-American real-estate developer Mohamed Hadid and Dutch former model Yolanda Hadid (née van den Herik). Through her father, she claims descent from Daher al-Umar, Prince of Nazareth and Sheik of Galilee. Her younger sister, Bella, and younger brother, Anwar, are also models. Additionally, she has two older paternal half-sisters, Marielle and Alana. In May 2025, Hadid and her sister Bella announced in a statement that they have a younger half sister through their father named Aydan Nix. They shared that they connected with Nix in late 2023. Nix was welcomed by her mother, Terri Hatfield Dull, after a brief relationship with Mohamed that came after his divorce from Yolanda. She and her siblings were raised on a ranch in Santa Barbara. The family moved to Beverly Hills after ten years.

Hadid has stated that "Gigi" was a childhood nickname that was also used by her mother while growing up in the Netherlands. She began using it in school to avoid confusion with a girl in her class named "Helena".

In 2013, Hadid graduated from Malibu High School, where she was captain of the varsity volleyball team, as well as an equestrian. After high school, she moved to New York City to study criminal psychology at The New School. She suspended her studies to focus on her modeling career.

== Career ==
=== 1997–2012: Early work ===
Hadid's modeling career began when she was two years old, after Guess co-founder Paul Marciano discovered her. She appeared in Baby Guess ads before stopping to concentrate on school. She returned to modeling in 2011 and then resumed working with Marciano, becoming the face of a 2012 Guess campaign. As an adult, she has shot three campaigns with Guess.

=== 2013–2016: Breakthrough ===
After signing to IMG Models in 2013, Hadid made her New York Fashion Week debut in February 2014, walking for Desigual. In the same month, she made a high fashion break, appearing on the cover of Carine Roitfeld's CR Fashion Book. On July 15, 2014, she starred alongside actor and model Patrick Schwarzenegger in designer Tom Ford's Eyewear autumn/winter campaign. She co-hosted the Daily Front Row's Fashion Media Awards event held in New York City on September 5, 2014. She has also starred in campaigns for Tom Ford F/W 2014, Tom Ford Velvet Orchard Fragrance and Tom Ford Beauty 2014. She was featured on the cover of Galore magazine in 2014.

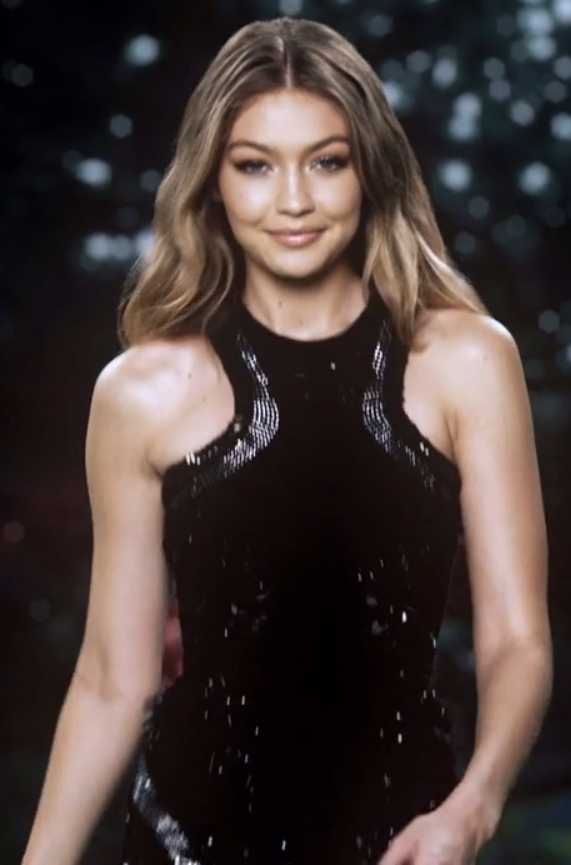
Hadid in 2016

Hadid appeared in the 2015 Pirelli Calendar. Also in 2015, she was the brand ambassador for Australian fashion swimwear label Seafolly. In January 2015, she was named the Daily Front Row's Model of the Year and a Maybelline brand ambassador. In March 2015, she and her then-boyfriend Cody Simpson were featured as a part of fashion photographer Mario Testino's project "Towel Series". By May 2015, she had walked for designers Marc Jacobs, Chanel, Michael Kors, Jean Paul Gaultier, and Max Mara. She appeared in the music video for Taylor Swift's song "Bad Blood", released the same month. Hadid starred in another music video for Scottish DJ Calvin Harris's song "How Deep Is Your Love" released in August the same year. She has made several appearances alongside her sister Bella. In December 2015, she made her first appearance at the Victoria's Secret Fashion Show.

Hadid has appeared on the covers of Vogue (United States, Paris, Italy, Britain, Japan, Spain, Australia, Brazil, the Netherlands, Germany, China), Schön!, Numéro, Allure, W Magazine and Teen Vogue, as well as The Wall Street Journal, Elle (Canada), Dazed and Harper's Bazaar (United States, Malaysia). She has shot editorials for VMAN, Elle (United States), Grazia, Cleo, Vogue, Sports Illustrated, Paper Magazine, Vanity Fair and V Magazine. She has starred in campaigns for Guess, Versace, Penshoppe, Balmain F/W 2015, Topshop, Max Mara, and Stuart Weitzman.

In 2016, she walked for Versace, Chanel, Elie Saab, Fendi, Marc Jacobs, Anna Sui, Miu Miu, Balmain, Diane Von Furstenberg, Tommy Hilfiger, Fenty x Puma, Isabel Marant, and Giambattista Valli. In January 2016, she became the global brand ambassador for Tommy Hilfiger, fronting campaigns for underwear, apparel and fragrances. In April 2016, Hadid starred in an interactive campaign including a commercial for the BMW M2. She hosted the 2016 iHeartRadio Much Music Video Awards in Toronto on June 19, 2016. She co-designed a capsule collection with Tommy Hilfiger called Gigi by Tommy Hilfiger, which was released in the fall of 2016 at New York Fashion Week. During the Fall 2016 Fashion Weeks in New York, Milan and Paris, she opened five shows and closed seven. In October, her boot collection for Stuart Weitzman titled the Gigi Boot was revealed, and she became a brand ambassador for Reebok, fronting the #PerfectNever campaign.

On November 20, 2016, she hosted the American Music Awards alongside Saturday Night Live alum Jay Pharoah. She received backlash for an impression of Melania Trump during the show, and later apologized. In December 2016, she made her second appearance at the Victoria's Secret Fashion Show, earning her wings for the first time, and in the same month she won the award for International Model of the Year at the British Fashion Awards, presented to her by Donatella Versace.

=== 2017–present: Further recognition and brand collaborations ===
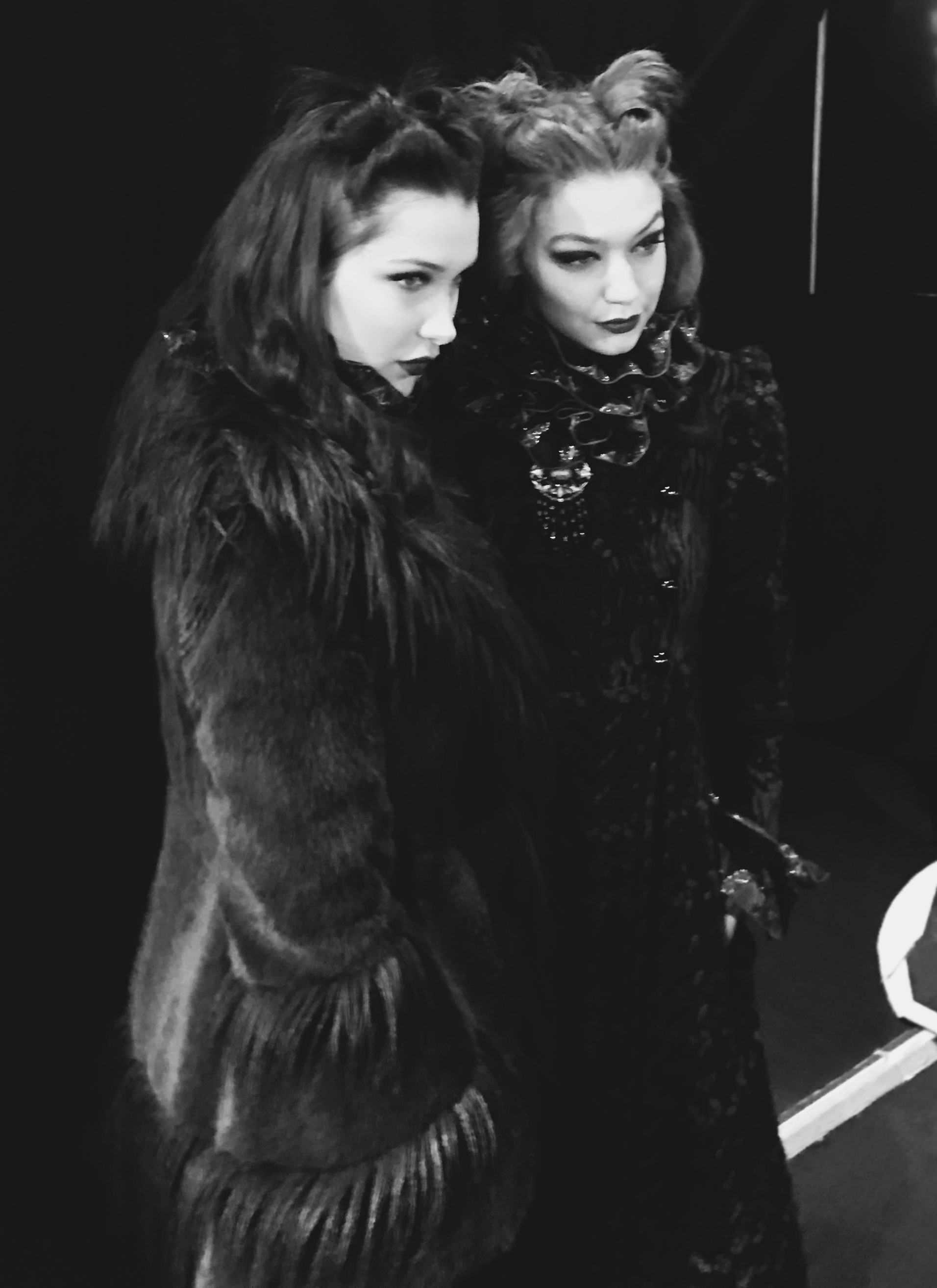
Hadid with her sister, Bella, at the Anna Sui Fall Winter 2017 show at New York Fashion Week, Skylight Clarkston Square, February 15, 2017

Hadid started off the Spring/Summer campaign season starring in Fendi and Moschino campaigns. She also was the face of the S/S 2017 campaign for Max Mara accessories, Stuart Weitzman and DSQUARED^{2}. The second Tommy Hilfiger and Hadid ready-to-wear collection was presented in February 2017 for the Spring season. She was the photographer of the Versus (Versace) Spring/Summer 2017 campaign which featured her then-boyfriend, singer Zayn Malik, and model Adwoa Aboah. She also photographed a special summer edition of V Magazine titled Gigi's Journal, which featured Polaroids of fashion industry colleagues, celebrities and close friends.

She was featured on four March 2017 Vogue covers: American, British, Chinese, and the inaugural edition of Vogue Arabia. She also appeared on the covers for CR Fashion Book (Spring/Summer 2017), Jolie (April 2017) and The Daily (Spring 2017). She featured on the May 2017 covers for the Dutch editions of Vogue, Cosmopolitan and Glamour as well as the June/July 2017 cover of American Harper's Bazaar. She has starred in editorials for American Vogue (April 2017) and LOVE Magazine (Spring/Summer 2017).

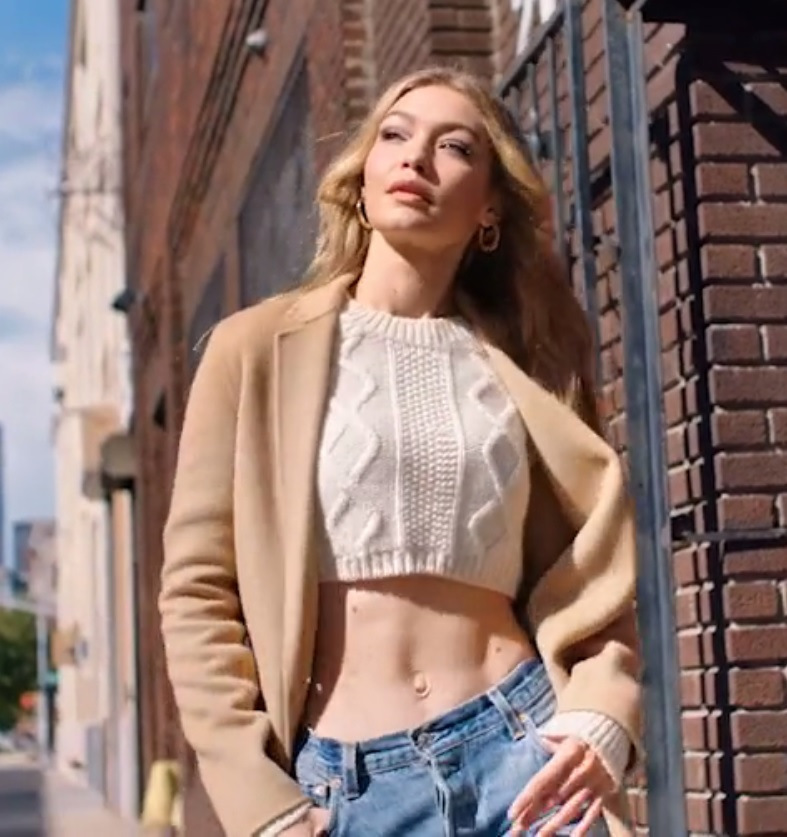
Hadid in a campaign for Stuart Weitzman in 2017

She scored her second American Vogue cover in August 2017, sharing it with her then-boyfriend, Zayn Malik. The third Tommy Hilfiger and Hadid collection was presented in September 2017. During Fall/Winter 2017 Fashion Month in New York, Milan and Paris, she opened the shows for Jeremy Scott, Anna Sui, Versus (Versace), Alberta Ferretti, Missoni, H&M and Balmain; and closed the shows for Isabel Marant, Moschino, Max Mara and Anna Sui. She also released the first season of two new collaborations with Vogue Eyewear and Messika Jewelry. At the Daily Front Row's third annual Fashion Los Angeles Awards, she was honored for the Best Design Debut for her collection with Tommy Hilfiger. She ended 2017 by being named one of Glamour's Women of the Year, alongside Nicole Kidman, Solange Knowles, Muzoon Almellehan and others.

She started 2018 with multiple high fashion campaigns, including Valentino, Moschino, Versace and Fendi. She also went on to release her second collaboration with both Vogue Eyewear and Messika Jewelry. In February, during fashion week, she presented the fourth and last season of her capsule collection with Tommy Hilfiger in Milan.

She appeared on many different international Vogue covers in 2018, including British Vogue in March, Vogue Italia in May and Vogue Brazil in September. She also scored multiple American covers, including the Harper's Bazaar May issue, V Magazine's Fall Preview Cover V114, and W Magazine. She also covered LOVE Magazine's 10th Anniversary edition, Chaos 69, and Chaos True Originals – Disney Special.

In November 2018, she announced her first collaboration with Reebok designing sneakers for the brand, starting with limited release on December 7 and the full collection to be released later in February 2019. She also returned to the Victoria's Secret Fashion Show for the third time in the same month. In early 2019, she appeared on more international Vogue covers, including Vogue Czechoslovakia, Vogue Arabia, and Vogue Hong Kong.

In October 2019, she filmed an episode for Food Network cooking competition Beat Bobby Flay. She teamed up with chef Anne Burrell against chef and restaurateur Bobby Flay. The episode aired in June 2020. She guest-starred in an episode of Scooby-Doo and Guess Who? that aired on October 1, 2020, on streaming service Boomerang.

In August 2022, Hadid revealed that she would be launching her first solo clothing line, Guest in Residence. Serving as founder and creative director the brand was launched in September that year. In 2023, Hadid and Tan France co-hosted the reality fashion competition Next In Fashion. The show was released through Netflix on March 3, 2023. French luxury fashion house Rabanne announced Hadid as the face of its new fragrance, Million Gold For Her in August 2024. In March 2025, Brazilian footwear brand "Havaianas" announced their partnership with Hadid as its new global ambassador. Their collaboration was released in May 2025. In the same month, Hadid announced her clothing line Guest in Residence collaboration with Los Angeles-based brand "Madhappy" on a limited collection of women's apparel.

== Activism ==
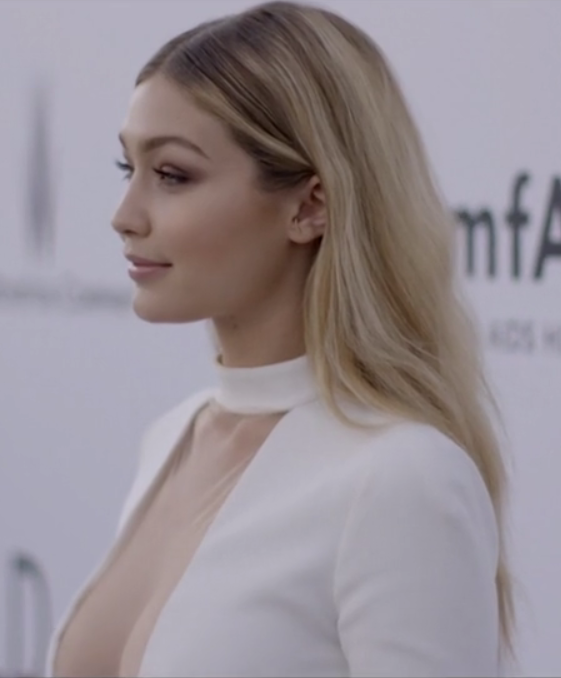
Hadid at the amFAR Gala in 2015

Hadid is a long-time supporter of Palestine and the Free Palestine movement. Bella Hadid and Gigi Hadid have donated $1 million to Palestinian relief agencies.

In January 2016, Hadid participated in MasterChef and raised $25,000 for Global Lyme Alliance. In October 2016, she joined other celebrities in supporting the BBC's Children in Need's T-shirt philanthropy project. The shirt, designed by Giles Deacon, sold for $15 with 70% of all the proceeds going to the charity.

In January 2017, after former President Donald Trump signed Executive Order 13769 (commonly known as a "Muslim Ban"), Hadid and her sister, Bella, protested among others in New York City.

Hadid announced in May 2018 that she would be working closely with UNICEF to help children around the world. On August 25, she went on her first mission with UNICEF to visit their programing in Bangladesh. The trip fell on the eve of the first anniversary of the Rohingya refugee crisis.

On May 3, 2020, Hadid and other celebrities joined forces to play a virtual charity tennis match on Facebook Gaming. Organized by IMG Tennis, the participants all received $25,000 to donate to a charity of their choice. The winners received an additional $1 million to donate. Hadid played for the non-profit organization Feeding America. In June 2020, Hadid auctioned off some of her clothes as part of a charity auction organized by British Vogue that benefitted NHS Charities Together and the NAACP.

Hadid has shown support for the Black Lives Matter movement. A percentage of the sales from her quarantine editorial with V Magazine, Gigi's Journal Part II, were donated to four organizations; the Black Lives Matter Global Network Foundation, the NAACP, the ACLU, and Campaign Zero. The organizations also received personal donations from Hadid.

In 2022, Hadid pledged to donate her earnings from the Fall 2022 shows to help Ukrainian victims of the Russian invasion and Palestinians. Vogue magazine reported Hadid's donations to Ukraine but omitted Palestine, for which it received criticism.

== Personal life ==
She revealed in 2014 that she has Hashimoto's thyroiditis.

Hadid has discussed her struggles with social anxiety, for which she attends psychotherapy to help manage.

Ukrainian self-styled prankster Vitalii Sediuk lifted her off the ground from behind in 2016 under the pretense of a prank, and she was commended on how she defended herself from him.

On November 7, 2022, Hadid deleted her Twitter account, saying on Instagram, "For a long time, but especially with its new leadership, it's becoming more and more of a cesspool of hate & bigotry, and it's not a place I want to be a part of."

=== Relationships ===
Hadid was in an on-again, off-again relationship with Australian singer Cody Simpson. The pair first met in 2013 when she appeared in his music video for "Surfboard". They began dating later that year before their breakup in 2014. They reunited a few months later before splitting for a second time in May 2015. She appeared in Simpson's music video for "Flower" in February 2015.

Hadid was in a relationship with American singer Joe Jonas from June to October 2015. She co-directed Jonas' band DNCE's music video for "Cake by the Ocean".

She began dating English singer Zayn Malik in late 2015; they broke up and reconciled multiple times. She appeared in Malik's music video for "Pillowtalk". They starred on the August 2017 cover of American Vogue, making them the third couple to appear together on a Vogue cover. It courted controversy because of Vogue misnaming them as gender fluid, for which Vogue apologized. They also did a Versus (Versace) campaign as a couple, with Hadid as the photographer. In April 2020, she confirmed that she and Malik were expecting their first child during an interview on The Tonight Show Starring Jimmy Fallon, after rumors began to circulate of her pregnancy. Their daughter was born in September 2020. The family spent a majority of their time on a farm in rural New Hope, Pennsylvania, where Hadid's mother and younger sister, Bella, also own land.

In October 2021, Malik entered a no-contest plea to four charges of harassment against Hadid's mother, Yolanda. He was sentenced by a Pennsylvania court to 360 days of probation as well as counseling for anger management and domestic violence. Hadid and Malik reportedly ended their relationship after the incident; they both co–parent their daughter.

Hadid has been in a relationship with actor Bradley Cooper since 2023.

=== Legal issues ===
In 2017, Hadid attempted to travel to Shanghai to participate in the 2017 Victoria's Secret Fashion Show but ultimately could not, as her Chinese visa was reportedly revoked after an online video showing her doing a slant-eyes gesture in imitation of Buddha was criticized as racist by Chinese internet users.

Also in 2017, photographer Peter Cepeda took a photo of her, which she later posted on Instagram. He filed a lawsuit against her the following September and it was later settled outside of court. In late January 2019, Hadid was sued by the independent photo agency business Xclusive for sharing an October 2018 photo of herself without the photographer's permission.

On July 10, 2023, Hadid was arrested in the Cayman Islands under charges of importation of drugs and drug paraphernalia after customs and border control discovered a small amount of marijuana, along with "smoking utensils", to be among her belongings when she touched down at the Owen Roberts International Airport. Although determined that the possession of the marijuana was for personal use only, Hadid was nonetheless charged with importation-related crimes. She was later processed, fined $1,000, and released.

== Filmography ==
=== Film and television ===
Year	Title	Role	Notes
2012	Virgin Eyes	Andrea	Short film
2012–2016	The Real Housewives of Beverly Hills	Herself	Multiple appearances (season 3–6)
2015	Those Wrecked by Success	Herself	Short film
2016	MasterChef	Herself	Episode: "MasterChef Celebrity Showdown"
2016	RuPaul's Drag Race	Guest judge	Episode: "Supermodel Snatch Game" season 8, week 5
2016	Lip Sync Battle	Herself	Episode: "Gigi Hadid vs. Tyler Posey"
2016	iHeartRadio Much Music Video Awards	Host	
2016	American Music Awards	Host	
2018	Ocean's 8	Herself	Cameo
2018	Pirelli Calendar	Herself	Short film by Albert Watson
2020	Beat Bobby Flay	Herself	Episode: "Superchef, Supermodel"
2020	Scooby-Doo and Guess Who?	Herself	Episode: "A Moveable Mystery"
2021–2023	Never Have I Ever	Herself (voice)	2 episodes
2023	Next In Fashion	Co-host	Season 2
2026	Not Suitable for Work	Catherine	Episode: "The Philadelphia Thirst Monster"

=== Music videos ===
Year	Title	Artist	Role
2014	"Surfboard"	Cody Simpson	Herself
2014	"Simplethings"	Miguel	Love interest
2015	"Bad Blood"	Taylor Swift	Slay-Z
2015	"Flower"	Cody Simpson	Herself (cameo)
2015	"How Deep Is Your Love"	Calvin Harris and Disciples	Girl in love
2015	"Gasoline"	Halsey	Herself
2015	"Cake by the Ocean"	DNCE	Director
2016	"Pillowtalk"	Zayn	Girlfriend
2020	"One More Time" (V Magazine version)	Daft Punk	Animated version of herself

== Music releases ==
Year	Title	Artist	Role
2007	"The Little Drummer Boy" on Noël	Josh Groban	Backing vocals
2007	"I'll Be Home for Christmas" on Noël	Josh Groban	Backing vocals

== Awards and nominations ==
Gigi Hadid award nominations
Year	Association	Category	Result
2015	First Annual Fashion Los Angeles Awards	Model of The Year	Won
2015	Teen Choice Awards	Choice Model	Nominated
2016	TRL Awards	Best Look	Won
2016	Teen Choice Awards	Choice Female Hottie	Nominated
2016	British Fashion Awards	International Model of the Year	Won
2017	Third Annual Fashion Los Angeles Awards	Best Design Debut	Won
2017	Teen Choice Awards	Choice Model	Nominated
2018	Teen Choice Awards	Choice Model	Won
