= Daily Front Row =

Fashion magazine

- Editor: Brandusa Niro
- Categories: Fashion magazine
- Frequency: Daily during New York Fashion Week
- Founded: November 2002
- Country: United States
- Based in: New York City
- Language: English
- Website: fashionweekdaily.com
- OCLC: 75288722

The Daily Front Row, commonly known as The Daily, is an American fashion industry publication. Brandusa Niro founded it in November 2002 and is the current editor-in-chief. Formerly owned by IMG, the magazine launched for New York Fashion Week in February 2003.

The Daily is distributed every day during Mercedes-Benz Fashion Week in New York City, chronicling the goings-on from the front rows to behind the scenes. It is distributed for free at the site of Fashion Week. For the remainder of the year, the online magazine is updated every weekday with fashion news, party reports, features, and The Daily's blog, Chic Report.

The Daily also produces print issues during Mercedes-Benz Fashion Week Swim in Miami, and has produced issues for fashion weeks in Sydney, Toronto, Moscow, and Mexico City. In addition, The Daily produces issues covering various fashion trade shows, including Coterie, WSA, and Collective.

== History ==
In an article in Vanity Fair in 2007, Niro's friend Graydon Carter, the then-editor, called The Daily "the guiltiest pleasure of Fashion Week in New York".

In December 2009, The Daily branched out from fashion for the first time to produce a special issue for Art Basel Miami. In May 2010, three issues were produced for the Tribeca Film Festival.

In 2011, Niro bought a controlling interest.

In 2015, the magazine created the Fashion Los Angeles Awards to honor the best in fashion in Hollywood. Honorees included Carine Roitfeld in 2015 and Stephen Gan in 2017.
