= Styling Hollywood =

2019 reality show on Netflix

- Genre: Reality-TV
- Created by: Carlos King
- No. of seasons: 1
- No. of episodes: 8

Production
- Executive producers: Carlos King; David George; Jordana Hochman; Angela Rae Berg
- Production companies: Kingdom Reign Entertainment; ITV America

Original release
- Network: Netflix
- Release: August 30, 2019

Styling Hollywood is a 2019 documentarian non-scripted fashion reality television series on Netflix created by Carlos King and starring celebrity stylist Jason Bolden and his husband, interior designer Adair Curtis through their JSN Studio.

The full season of Styling Hollywood was released on August 30, 2019.

== Cast ==
- Jason Bolden
- Adair Curtis

== Release ==
Styling Hollywood was released on August 30, 2019, on Netflix streaming.

== Episodes ==
No.	Title	Original release date
1	"Black Girl Magic"	August 30, 2019
Award season kicks off with Jason dressing Taraji P. Henson, Yara Shahidi and Zazie Beetz for the Emmys. But one gown may trip up his glam plans.
2	"Taraji & Yara & Zazie, Oh My!"	August 30, 2019
Jason scrambles to get Taraji ready for the red carpet while Adair scopes out a large-scale renovation: Dulé Hill and Jazmyn Simon's new home.
3	"Who's the Boss B*tch?"	August 30, 2019
Tensions run high after a meltdown. Jason makes a power suit work for Sabrina Carpenter. Irked, Adair finds himself feeling salty.
4	"A Storm is Coming"	August 30, 2019
After an Out Magazine shoot, Jason puts Storm Reid in a chic jumpsuit and gets ready to style Serena Williams for a cover. Adair calls out Kafia.
5	"We're Off but We're On"	August 30, 2019
Fuming over Kafia, Adair preps to revamp Sanaa Lathan's space. A rare Off-White gown makes the cut for Janet Mock as Jason shops for red carpet bling.
6	"I Fired You First"	August 30, 2019
Adair and Kafia's clash climaxes. Melinda takes on a major project. Jason outfits Yara in a cool catsuit for the SAG Awards. Sanaa gets a big reveal.
7	"All About Eve"	August 30, 2019
Punches are thrown, and Adair hurls shade. For the Grammys, Jason dresses Eve in a dramatic jumpsuit then hones his parenting skills.
8	"Black Boy Joy"	August 30, 2019
Beyond stressed about the Oscars, Jason dreams up a custom gown for Ava DuVernay. Adair rushes to meet enormous expectations -- and a new arrival.
