= Shawish clan =

Shawish (Shaweesh, Shawesh) (Arabic: الشاويش, شاويش, الشاوش) is a large and widespread Palestinian family originated from the Damascus Gate neighbourhood of East Jerusalem.

The Shawish surname has several variations in languages other than Arabic. Written Arabic language frequently omits vowels, therefore the surname is often spelled using only plain Arabic alphabet, literally as "Shawesh". "Al-" or "El", meaning "family of" or "the" in Arabic, is often used as a prefix to names in formal identifications. English or other languages translations of the surname therefore vary, some common versions include: (Al) Shawish; Shawish; (El) Shawesh; Shaweesh.

== Origin ==
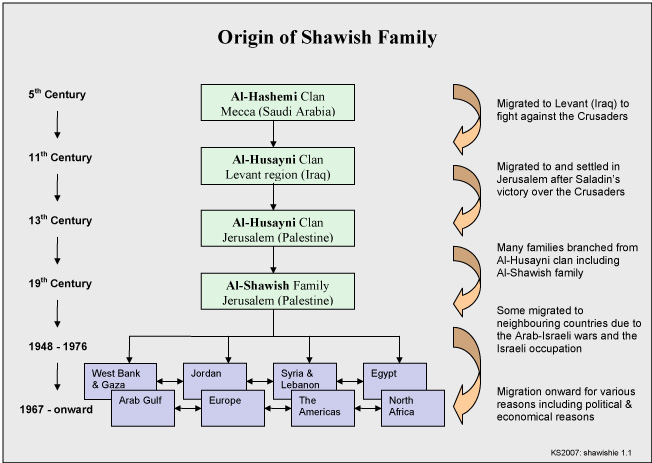
Origin and migration of Shawish family.

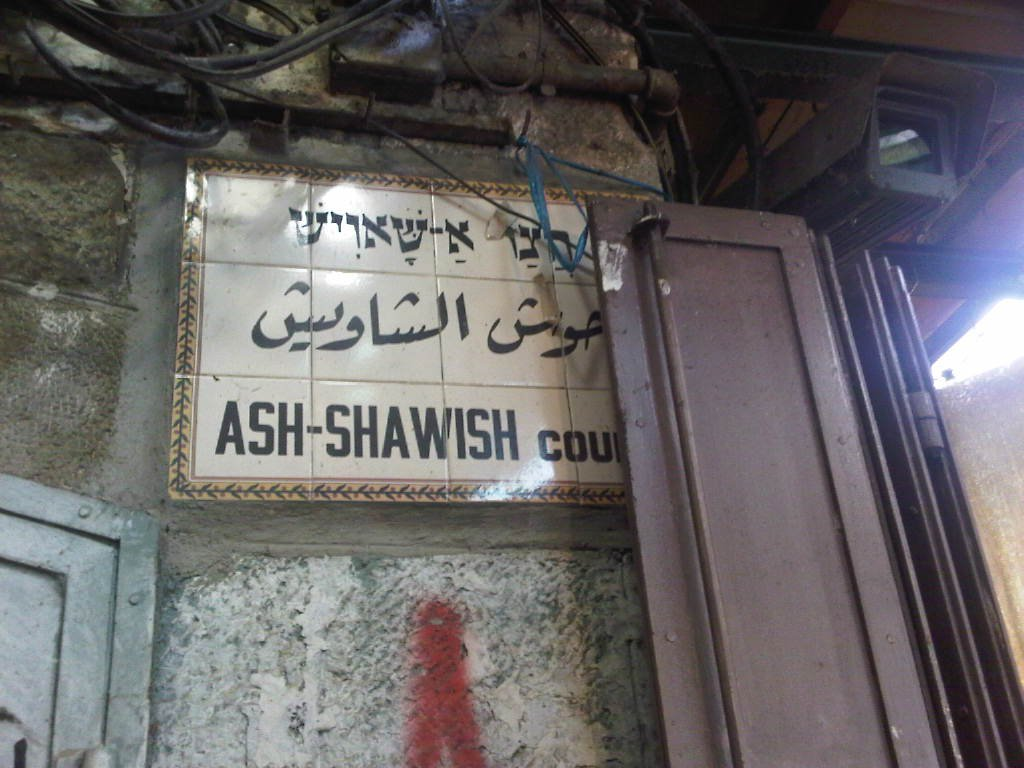
Shawish Neighbourhood, Old City of Jerusalem.

Several Islamic historians assert that the Shawish family is a descendant of the Islamic prophet Muhammad. This claim is based on verifiable historical documents describing the link through "twenty four men" (generations) between Muhammad and Ustaz Mohammad Zuhayr Al-Shawish (see below)

The Hashemi clan, to which Muhammad belonged, were the ancestors of Al-Husayni clan through Husayn ibn Ali, Muhammad's grandson, whose members migrated from Mecca to neighbouring countries in the Levant region to fight the crusaders. In the 13th century after Saladin victory over the crusaders, Al-Husayni clan settled in Jerusalem, expanded to thousands of members and gained power and influence.

During the periods of Ottoman Empire and British Mandate of Palestine, and due to significant historical and political events in Jerusalem, some Al-Husayni individuals adopted new surnames drawn from their professions. Within the Shawish family, it is widely believed that the name Shawish (meaning Police or Army Sergeant) originated from a policeman in the Old City of Jerusalem at that time, around the end of the 19th century.

An early record of the surname Shawish was in a British Newspaper “The New Age” article in 1910. The article discussed several current affairs in Egypt and made reference to Sheykh Abdul Aziz Shawish—or, as Egyptians pronounce it, Gawish as in Arabic his name is written عبد العزيز جاويش—editor of ”Al Lewa'” newspaper at that time.

== Migration ==
The Israeli occupation of the Palestinian territories and the city of Jerusalem following the 1967 Six-Day War forced some family members to immigrate to neighbouring countries, primarily to Amman, the Jordanian capital.

== Modern-day ==
At present the remaining Shawish family is one of the largest pre-1948 Palestinian families in the Old City of Jerusalem. In addition to the main bases of Jerusalem and Jordan, where the family has a very strong presence, many of the younger members of the family have emigrated for economic and educational reasons and currently reside in the United States, UAE, and smaller in numbers in Syria, Lebanon, Qatar, Saudi Arabia, Egypt, Morocco, Tunisia, Sudan, Brazil, Mexico, UK, Australia and many other countries.

== Occupation ==
Traditionally tradesmen and small business owners, currently many of the family members run their own small retail businesses in Jerusalem, Jordan, and to lesser extent in other countries. It is common to see signs above small shops saying “Al-Shawish” in the Old City of Jerusalem or downtown Amman. Some members of Shawish family have also entered mid-market professions; IT, Finance, Management, Sales and Marketing, Education and other Trades. The family is not known to have many craftsmen, civil servants, police or army personnel.
