= Minju Kim =

South Korean fashion designer

- Born: 30 March 1986 (age 40); Seoul, South Korea
- Education: Samsung Art & Design Institute, Royal Academy of Fine Arts (Antwerp)
- Website: minjukim.co

Minju Kim (Korean: 김민주; born 30 March 1986) is a South Korean fashion designer known for her womenswear and use of bold prints. In 2020, she was named the winner of the first season of Netflix's Next In Fashion.

Kim was born in Seoul, South Korea and studied in New Zealand as a teenager. She originally wanted to attend art school and become a cartoonist, but was encouraged by her parents to study fashion design in Seoul. She studied fashion design at the Samsung Art & Design Institute, followed by a master's degree at the Royal Academy of Fine Arts in Antwerp. Kim credits the influence of designers and RAFA instructors such as Walter Van Beirendonck with sparking her love of fashion design.

== Career ==
Kim launched her self-named, Seoul-based company MINJUKIM in 2015. She is known for starting her fashion shows with a design featuring a core, self-designed print that appears throughout the rest of the collection. Her 2018 Fall collection print was based on Galaxy Express 999. In addition to releasing collections each year, Kim has designed for Red Velvet. She also teaches design classes at Kookmin University.

In 2020 Kim was named the winner of Netflix's reality show and fashion design competition, Next In Fashion, edging out British designer Daniel Fletcher. She competed with Chinese designer Angel Chen during the team-based portion of the competition and the pair dubbed themselves as 'Dragon Princess'. As winner Kim received US$250,000 from Net-a-Porter to launch a collection for sale on their site. Kim was previously the winner of the 2013 H&M Design Award and was shortlisted for the LVMH Prize for Young Fashion Designers in 2014.

In 2021, Kim collaborated with the brand & Other Stories, a brand which is under the H&M Group. The launch of her collection, the Minjukim collection, quickly sold out and was largely successful. The limited collection was sold worldwide, and was sold out online within an hour on the Korean webstore. The & Other Stories collab was inspired by Kim's Spring-Summer collection of 2016, which was her brand's second collection to debut. The apparel consisted mostly of pastel colors and prints, accompanied by accessories such as sunglasses and hair clips which were also aligned with the spring theme.

In 2022, Kim launched a fall apparel line, where she shared her designs on her Instagram and official website. Several notable celebrities followed her on her social media account, like Riverdale star Lili Reinhart and more.
