= Tan France =

British-American fashion designer and television personality (born 1983)

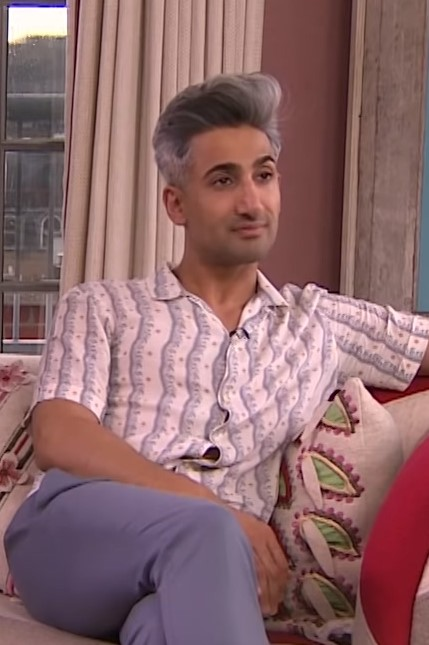
- France in June 2018
- Born: Tanveer Wasim Safdar; 20 April 1983 (age 43); Doncaster, England
- Education: Doncaster College
- Occupations: Fashion designer; entrepreneur; television personality
- Years active: 2011–present
- Spouse: Rob France (m. 2007)
- Children: 2

Tanveer Wasim France (né Safdar; born 20 April 1983) is a British-American fashion designer, entrepreneur, and television personality. He is known as the fashion expert for the Netflix series Queer Eye, host of the web series Dressing Funny, and co-host of Next in Fashion. His memoir, Naturally Tan, was released in June 2019. Of Pakistani descent, he is one of the first openly gay men of South Asian ancestry on a major show, (Note: Ranj Singh, of Indian Sikh descent, came out as a gay and has appeared on British and international TV since 2012; Mawaan Rizwan came out in 2012 and has appeared on British and international television; Tamal Ray came out in 2015 while appearing on The Great British Bake Off televised internationally; and Sushant Divgikar is an openly gay Indian TV personality known for his appearance in Bigg Boss.) and one of the first openly gay Muslim men on Western television.

== Early life ==
France was born Tanveer Wasim Safdar in Doncaster on 20 April 1983, the son of Muslim Pakistani immigrant parents. His father comes from a Potohari background, and his mother comes from a Punjabi background. In his memoir, he discussed his feelings of alienation growing up in Doncaster in a household where homosexuality was viewed negatively, the lack of representation in media of his community (and of LGBTQ Pakistanis in particular), and his personal experiences of physical and verbal racism as both a child and an adult. He said, "Our home wasn't super religious but we had a profound connection to our Muslim heritage."

France's interest in fashion began at a young age, inspired by the Disney-themed clothing that was made in his grandparents' denim factory in Bury, Greater Manchester, where he spent time working. By the age of 13, he had learned how to construct and embellish a denim jacket. In 2019, he learned that his grandfather had allegedly been forced to close the factory because it was turning out Disney knockoffs. He attended Hall Cross School and later studied fashion at Doncaster College, after which he moved to Manchester and then to London.

== Career ==
France began work as a designer and director for Zara, Selfridges, and Bershka, among others, to develop an understanding of the wholesale, retail, and manufacturing elements of the fashion industry. He started working in menswear before shifting his focus to women's fashion, which he majored in for his degree. France said that he would often work as a stylist if a high-profile client came into a store where he was working.

France began working in the United States in 2008, initially living in New York City, and emigrated there in 2015. He was company director at Shade Clothing before opening his own fashion company, Kingdom & State, in 2011. The brand included apparel designed to meet Mormon clothing guidelines, as the group represents a significant population in Utah, where the company is based. He later created two smaller apparel brands. France's designs were purchased by retailers ModCloth and Forever 21. In 2016 he became co-founder, designer, and CEO of the Rachel Parcell Inc clothing line, which was sold at Nordstrom.

After selling his businesses, France officially retired, intending to start a family with his husband, until he was contacted by Netflix. This started his journey as a media figure through his role as the fashion expert on the rebooted series Queer Eye, which premiered in February 2018. In 2019, France appeared in the music video for Taylor Swift's song "You Need to Calm Down". He also appeared in 2020 in a special charity edition of The Great British Bake Off to raise funds for Stand Up To Cancer, and was the episode's winner. That year, it was also announced that France would be co-hosting the new Netflix series Next in Fashion with Alexa Chung. In interviews with the ITV programme This Morning and with NPR, France disclosed that he had sold all three of his businesses after starting work for Netflix.

In 2019, France designed an eyewear line in partnership with Eyebuydirect. Since 2019, he has been a Middle East columnist for GQ. In 2020, he became Express's monthly stylist.

France was nominated for an Emmy alongside his Queer Eye co-stars for Best Hosting of a Reality or Competition Program in July 2020. In September 2020, France was announced as a style instructor on MasterClass, an educational streaming video platform. In September 2020, the Tan France x Etsy limited edition collection was launched, for which France co-designed a collection of home decor and foods with thirteen independent sellers.

France presented a 2022 BBC Two documentary about colourism titled Beauty and the Bleach. He was then made host of the English countryside-set series Say Yes to the Dress with Tan France (a spin-off of the TLC series), which premiered on Really in August 2023.

== Personal life ==
France currently lives in Salt Lake City, Utah. He married pediatric nurse and illustrator Rob France in 2007, originally in London, and again in New York City following the legalization of same-sex marriage in the US. In April 2021, he announced on Instagram that he and his husband were expecting their first child via surrogate. Their son was born seven weeks early on 10 July 2021, and had to spend three weeks in the NICU. On 28 May 2023, France announced on Instagram the arrival of their second son, also via surrogate.

France is a dual citizen of the United Kingdom and the United States. He became a naturalised American citizen on 9 June 2020, stating that he had been "working towards" obtaining American citizenship for "literally 20 years". He has discussed his love for cooking and baking, and learned how to cook and sew at the age of nine.

France has been vocal about the colorism, racism, and Islamophobia he has endured throughout his life. In September 2019, he created an Instagram account called Shaded, in which he promotes Black people, people of colour, and cultural diversity. In September 2020, he revealed on an episode of The Carlos Watson Show that experiencing racism in the UK was one of his primary reasons for moving to the US.

As construction on their "dream" Salt Lake City home neared completion, France said in 2023 that he and his husband were looking into purchasing a second home in London; France was working more in the UK with Say Yes to the Dress and a forthcoming undisclosed series, and they already visited frequently so the children could stay in touch with their British side.

== Books ==
France released a memoir, Naturally Tan, in June 2019 through St. Martin's Press. It became an NYT bestseller. It is about his experience growing up "gay in a traditional Muslim family, as one of the few people of colour in Doncaster, England". The memoir starts with his childhood in England where episodes of racism – such as having to run back to school to avoid getting beaten up by racist thugs – were everyday occurrences. The book also discusses colourism across South Asia and the Islamophobia he faced before and after the 9/11 attacks.

== Filmography ==
=== Television ===
| Year | Title | Role | Notes |
|---|---|---|---|
| 2018–2026 | Queer Eye | Himself | Main cast (47 episodes) |
| 2018 | Nailed It! | Himself | Episode: "3, 2, 1...Ya Not Done!!" |
| 2018 | Don't Watch This | Himself | Episode: "Antoni Psycho" |
| 2018 | Crazy Ex-Girlfriend | Fett Ragoso | Episode: "I'm Making Up for Lost Time" |
| 2019 | The Big Narstie Show | Himself | Season 2, Episode 1 |
| 2019 | Lip Sync Battle | Himself | Episode: Queer Eye |
| 2019–2020 | Dressing Funny | Himself | Host |
| 2019 | Big Mouth | Himself (voice) | Episode: "Disclosure the Movie: The Musical!" |
| 2020–present | Next in Fashion | Himself | Co-Host |
| 2020 | The Great Celebrity Bake Off for SU2C | Himself | Contestant |
| 2020 | The Big Process Ep.5 | Himself | Contestant |
| 2020 | Served! | Himself | Guest |
| 2020 | Boost My Business By Facebook | Himself | Host |
| 2020 | Celebrity Family Feud | Himself | Contestant |
| 2021 | Waffles + Mochi | Himself | Parodying Queer Eye Role |
| 2021 | Nickelodeon's Unfiltered | Himself | Episode: "Rollin' with the Fun Guy!" |
| 2021 | Selling Sunset | Himself | Host - Series 5:The Reunion |
| 2023 | The Circle | Himself | Judge |
| 2023 | Home at Last with Tan France | Himself | Homebuyer |
| 2023 | Say Yes to the Dress with Tan France | Himself | Host |
| 2025 | Deli Boys | Zubair | Episode 6: Lucy Boys |
| 2025 | With Love, Meghan | Himself | Season 2, Episode 3: "Easy as Pie" |

=== Music videos ===
| Year | Song | Artist |
|---|---|---|
| 2018 | "This Is Me (The Reimagined Remix)" | Keala Settle, Kesha, & Missy Elliott |
| 2019 | "You Need to Calm Down" | Taylor Swift |

== Awards and nominations ==
| Year | Award | Category | Work | Result | Ref. |
|---|---|---|---|---|---|
| 2020 | Primetime Emmy Award | Outstanding Host for a Reality or Reality Competition Program | Queer Eye | Nominated | |
| 2021 | Primetime Emmy Award | Outstanding Host for a Reality or Reality Competition Program | Queer Eye | Nominated | |
| 2022 | Primetime Emmy Award | Outstanding Host for a Reality or Reality Competition Program | Queer Eye | Nominated | |
| 2023 | Primetime Emmy Award | Outstanding Host for a Reality or Reality Competition Program | Queer Eye | Nominated | |
| 2023 | Primetime Emmy Award | Outstanding Structured Reality Program | Queer Eye | Won | |
| 2024 | Primetime Emmy Award | Outstanding Structured Reality Program | Queer Eye | Nominated | |
| 2025 | Primetime Emmy Award | Outstanding Structured Reality Program | Queer Eye | Won | |
