= Paul Sadler =

American politician

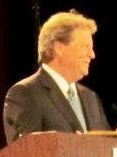
- Sadler in 2012

Member of the Texas House of Representatives from the 8th district
- In office January 3, 1993 – January 3, 2003
- Preceded by: Sam Russell
- Succeeded by: Byron Cook

Member of the Texas House of Representatives from the 9th district
- In office January 3, 1991 – January 3, 1993
- Preceded by: Jim McWilliams
- Succeeded by: Jerry Johnson

Personal details
- Born: Paul Lindsey Sadler; April 29, 1955 (age 71) Freer, Texas, U.S.
- Party: Democratic
- Spouse: Crystal Straube (m. 2015)
- Children: 5
- Education: Baylor University (BA, JD)

Paul Lindsey Sadler (born April 29, 1955) is an American attorney from Henderson, Texas, now residing in Bandera, Texas who served from 1991 to 2003 in the Texas House of Representatives. He was the Democratic nominee for the United States Senate in 2012. In the November 6 general election, he lost against the Republican Ted Cruz, who still holds the position.

== Early life, education, and law career ==
Sadler was born in Freer east of Laredo in South Texas, to Harold Sidney and Bessie Mae "Pete" Sadler. His father worked for Sun Oil Company and moved his family throughout Texas, California, and Louisiana.

In 1977, Sadler graduated from Baylor University in Waco, Texas. In 1979, he graduated from Baylor Law School. He is an active member of the Texas Bar. He has been admitted to practice in many federal courts, such as the U.S. Court of Appeals for the Fifth Circuit and the United States Supreme Court.

== Texas House of Representatives (1991-2003) ==
=== Elections ===
Sadler was first elected in 1990 to represent Texas' 9th House District. After redistricting, he ran in the newly redrawn Texas' 8th House District and won re-election in 1992, 1994, 1996, 1998, and 2000. He was unopposed in all but two years: 1996 (when he won with 61 percent) and 1998 (62 percent).

=== Tenure ===
In 1995, Sadler co-sponsored (with Republican state senator Bill Ratliff) the Ratliff–Sadler Act. This act became the Texas Education Code and gave some of the Texas Education Agency's former powers to locally-controlled school districts.

He was named to the Ten Best List of Texas state legislators by Texas Monthly in 1995, 1997, 1999, and 2001. He was named one of three "Outstanding Legislators" in 1995 and one of "Six Stellar" legislators in 1997 by the Dallas Morning News. He also earned the John B. Connally "Award for Excellence in Education" by the Just For The Kids Foundation.

=== Committee assignments ===
- Public Education Committee (Chairman)
- Judiciary Committee
- Pensions and Investments Committee
- Health and Human Services Committee
- State Revenue and Public School Finance Select Committee (Chairman)
- Public School Employee Health Insurance Select Committee (Chairman)

== 2004 special election ==
Incumbent State Senator Bill Ratliff of Texas' 1st Senate District decided to resign his seat in the middle of 2003. Ratliff's resignation created a special election in January 2004, in which Sadler finished first with 39 percent of the vote. In the runoff election, the Republican Kevin Eltife, a former Mayor of Tyler, defeated Sadler, 52-48 percent.

== Return to private sector ==
Sadler returned to practicing law in 2003 and specializes in product liability, major personal injury litigation and Prompt Pay representing Hospitals and doctors against insurance companies. He has litigated for a multi-billion dollar company in all fifty states.

In 2008, he became the executive director for the Wind Coalition, a regional trade group of wind power producers that advocates for increased wind resources in Texas.

Sadler has also served on the Governor's Advisory Energy Panel for Oklahoma.

== 2012 U.S. Senate election ==
Incumbent Republican U.S. Senator Kay Bailey Hutchison decided to retire effective January 2013. After Democrat Ricardo Sanchez dropped out of contention, Sadler announced his candidacy for the seat, which was held from 1971 to 1993 by the Democrat Lloyd M. Bentsen.

On July 31, 2012, Sadler won a runoff election for his party's Senate nomination 63% to 37%. He defeated Grady Yarbrough, a retired educator from San Antonio.

Sadler was defeated by Republican candidate Ted Cruz, who received 4,456,599 ballots or 56.6% of the votes cast. Sadler received 3,183,314 ballots or 40.5% of the votes cast.

== Personal life ==
Sadler lives in San Antonio, Texas. He has five children and three step-children.

He was named one of three "Outstanding Legislators" by the Dallas Morning News (1995)

Party political offices
Preceded by Barbara Ann Radnofsky	Democratic nominee for U.S. Senator from Texas (Class 1); 2012	Succeeded by Beto O'Rourke
