= Texas's 1st Senate district =

American legislative district

Texas's 1st State Senate district
Senator
Bryan Hughes; R–Mineola
- Demographics: 64.7% White; 18.3% Black; 15.1% Hispanic; 1.3% Asian
- Population: 841,254

District 1 of the Texas Senate is a senatorial district that serves all of Bowie, Camp, Cass, Delta, Franklin, Gregg, Harrison, Hopkins, Lamar, Marion, Morris, Panola, Red River, Rusk, Smith, Titus, Upshur, and Wood counties in the U.S. state of Texas. The current senator from District 1 is Bryan Hughes.

== Election history ==
=== 2022 ===
Bryan Hughes (Republican) was unopposed; as such, the election was cancelled and Hughes was declared elected without a vote.

=== 2020 ===
Texas general election, 2020: Senate District 1
Party	Candidate	Votes	%	±%
Republican	Bryan Hughes	267,404	75.26	−24.74
Democratic	Audrey Spanko	87,885	24.74	+24.74
Turnout		355,289	100.00	
Republican hold				

=== 2016 ===
Texas general election, 2016: Senate District 1
Party	Candidate	Votes	%	±%
Republican	Bryan Hughes	245,648	100	+28.63
Turnout		245,648		−16.55
Republican hold				

2016 Republican Primary Runoff, District 1: Senate District 1
Party	Candidate	Votes	%	±%
Republican	Bryan Hughes	27,541	69.33	
Republican	David Simpson	12,186	30.67	
Turnout		39,727		

2016 Republican Party Primary, District 1: Senate District 1
Party	Candidate	Votes	%	±%
Republican	Bryan Hughes	64,200	48.03	
Republican	David Simpson	28,395	21.24	
Republican	James K. Red Brown	28,382	21.23	
Republican	Mike Lee	12,683	9.49	
Turnout		133,660		

=== 2012 ===
Texas general election, 2012: Senate District 1
Party	Candidate	Votes	%	±%
Republican	Kevin P. Eltife	210,091	71.37	−28.63
Democratic	Steven Russell	84,262	28.63	+28.63
Turnout		294,353		+109.8
Republican hold				

=== 2010 ===
Texas general election, 2010: Senate District 1
Party	Candidate	Votes	%	±%
Republican	Kevin P. Eltife	140,273	100	+16.87
Turnout		140,273		+6.54
Republican hold				

=== 2006 ===
Texas general election, 2006: Senate District 1
Party	Candidate	Votes	%	±%
Republican	Kevin P. Eltife	109,450	83.13	+14.96
Libertarian	Jason Albers	22,211	16.87	+16.87
Majority		87,239	66.26	+29.92
Turnout		131,661		−21.23
Republican hold				

=== 2004 (special) ===
Special runoff election, 17 February 2004: Senate District 1, Unexpired term
Party	Candidate	Votes	%	±%
Republican	Kevin Eltife	46,437	51.86	+15.85
Democratic	Paul Sadler	43,103	48.14	+8.63
Majority		3,334	3.72	
Turnout		89,540		+29.38
Republican hold				

Special election, 20 January 2004: Senate District 1, Unexpired term
Party	Candidate	Votes	%	±%
Republican	Kevin Eltife	24,919	36.01	
Republican	Bill Godsey	502	0.73	
Republican	Tommy Merritt	14,786	21.36	
Democratic	Paul Sadler	27,339	39.50	
Constitution	Daryl Ware	480	0.69	
Republican	Jerry Yost	1,180	1.71	
Turnout		69,206		

=== 2002 ===
Texas general election, 2002: Senate District 1
Party	Candidate	Votes	%	±%
Republican	Bill Ratliff	113,939	68.17	−31.83
Democratic	B.D. Blount	53,201	31.83	+31.83
Majority		60,738	36.34	−63.66
Turnout		167,140		+85.66
Republican hold				

Republican primary, 2002: Senate District 1
Candidate		Votes	%	±
✓	Bill Ratliff	20,367	69.79	
	Jerry Yost	8,816	30.21	
Turnout		29,183		

=== 1998 ===
Texas general election, 1998: Senate District 1
Party	Candidate	Votes	%	±%
Republican	Bill Ratliff	90,024	100.00	+35.46
Majority		90,024	100.00	+70.93
Turnout		90,024		−42.60
Republican hold				

=== 1994 ===
Texas general election, 1994: Senate District 1
Party	Candidate	Votes	%	±%
Republican	Bill Ratliff	101,207	64.54	+12.40
Democratic	George Lavender	55,616	35.46	−12.40
Majority		45,591	29.07	+24.81
Turnout		156,823		−20.09
Republican hold				

Democratic primary, 1994: Senate District 1
Candidate		Votes	%	±
	VaLinda Hathcox	21,743	42.40	
✓	George Lavender	29,537	57.60	
Turnout		51,280		

=== 1992 ===
Texas general election, 1992: Senate District 1
Party	Candidate	Votes	%	±%
Republican	Bill Ratliff	102,310	52.13	
Democratic	A. M. "Bob" Aikin, III	93,937	47.86	
Majority		8,373	4.27	
Turnout		200,760		
Republican hold				

Democratic primary, 1992: Senate District 1
Candidate		Votes	%	±
✓	A. M. "Bob" Aikin, III	51,143	69.33	
	Steve Gamble	22,626	30.67	
Turnout		73,769		

== District officeholders ==
Leg.	Senator	Party	Term start	Term end	Counties in District
1st	William M. "Buckskin" Williams	Unknown	February 16, 1846	December 13, 1847	Fannin, Lamar
2nd	William M. "Buckskin" Williams	Unknown	December 13, 1847	November 5, 1849	Fannin, Lamar
3rd	Matthias Ward	Unknown	November 13, 1849	November 3, 1851	Bowie, Cass, Titus
4th	Joseph H. Burks	Unknown	November 3, 1851	November 7, 1853	Bowie, Red River
5th	Joseph H. Burks	Unknown	November 7, 1853	November 5, 1855	Bowie, Red River
6th	Solomon H. Pirkey	Unknown	November 5, 1855	November 7, 1859	Bowie, Red River
7th	Solomon H. Pirkey	Unknown	November 5, 1855	November 7, 1859	Bowie, Red River
8th	James W. Sims	Unknown	November 7, 1859	November 4, 1861	Bowie, Red River
9th	Rufus K. Hartley	Unknown	November 4, 1861	August 6, 1866	Chambers, Galveston, Jefferson, Liberty
10th	Rufus K. Hartley	Unknown	November 4, 1861	August 6, 1866	Chambers, Galveston, Jefferson, Liberty
11th	Frederick Forney Foscue	Unknown	August 6, 1866	February 7, 1870	Chambers, Galveston, Jefferson, Liberty
12th	Edward Bradford Pickett	Democratic	February 21, 1870	January 13, 1874	Chambers, Hardin, Jasper, Jefferson, Liberty, Newton, Orange, Polk, Tyler
13th	Edward Bradford Pickett	Democratic	February 21, 1870	January 13, 1874	Chambers, Hardin, Jasper, Jefferson, Liberty, Newton, Orange, Polk, Tyler
14th	Edwin Hobby	Democratic	January 13, 1874	April 18, 1876	Chambers, Hardin, Jasper, Jefferson, Liberty, Newton, Orange, Polk, Tyler
15th	Edwin Hobby	Democratic	April 18, 1876	July 10, 1879	Chambers, Hardin, Jasper, Jefferson, Liberty, Newton, Orange, Polk, San Jacinto, Tyler
16th	Edwin Hobby	Democratic	April 18, 1876	July 10, 1879	Chambers, Hardin, Jasper, Jefferson, Liberty, Newton, Orange, Polk, San Jacinto, Tyler
17th	Samuel Bronson Cooper	Democratic	January 11, 1883	January 9, 1883	Chambers, Hardin, Jasper, Jefferson, Liberty, Newton, Orange, Polk, San Jacinto, Tyler
18th	Samuel Bronson Cooper	Democratic	January 9, 1883	January 13, 1885	Chambers, Hardin, Jasper, Jefferson, Liberty, Newton, Orange, Polk, San Jacinto, Tyler
19th	William L. Douglass	Democratic	January 13, 1885	January 8, 1889	Chambers, Hardin, Jasper, Jefferson, Liberty, Newton, Orange, Polk, San Jacinto, Tyler
20th	William L. Douglass	Democratic	January 13, 1885	January 8, 1889	Chambers, Hardin, Jasper, Jefferson, Liberty, Newton, Orange, Polk, San Jacinto, Tyler
21st	Kennan B. Seale	Democratic	January 8, 1889	January 10, 1893	Chambers, Hardin, Jasper, Jefferson, Liberty, Newton, Orange, Polk, San Jacinto, Tyler
22nd	Kennan B. Seale	Democratic	January 8, 1889	January 10, 1893	Chambers, Hardin, Jasper, Jefferson, Liberty, Newton, Orange, Polk, San Jacinto, Tyler
23rd	Benjamin Whitaker	Democratic	January 10, 1893	January 12, 1897	Bowie, Cass, Marion, Morris
24th	Benjamin Whitaker	Democratic	January 10, 1893	January 12, 1897	Bowie, Cass, Marion, Morris
25th	Simon J. Morriss	Democratic	January 12, 1897	January 8, 1901	Bowie, Cass, Marion, Morris
26th	Simon J. Morriss	Democratic	January 12, 1897	January 8, 1901	Bowie, Cass, Marion, Morris
27th	James R. Wilson	Democratic	January 8, 1901	January 13, 1903	Bowie, Cass, Marion, Morris
28th	James R. Wilson	Democratic	January 13, 1903	May 1, 1903	Bowie, Cass, Marion, Morris
29th	James M. Terrell	Democratic	January 10, 1905	January 8, 1907	Bowie, Cass, Marion, Morris
30th	James M. Terrell	Democratic	January 8, 1907	January 10, 1911	Bowie, Cass, Marion, Morris
31st	James M. Terrell	Democratic	January 8, 1907	January 10, 1911	Bowie, Cass, Marion, Morris
32nd	Horace W. Vaughan	Democratic	January 14, 1911	April 1, 1913	Bowie, Cass, Marion, Morris
33rd	Horace W. Vaughan	Democratic	January 14, 1911	April 1, 1913	Bowie, Cass, Marion, Morris
33rd	Absolom C. Oliver	Democratic	August 13, 1913	August 21, 1913	Bowie, Cass, Marion, Morris
33rd	John M. Henderson	Democratic	September 11, 1914	January 12, 1915	Bowie, Cass, Marion, Morris
34th	John M. Henderson	Democratic	January 12, 1915	January 14, 1919	Bowie, Cass, Marion, Morris
35th	John M. Henderson	Democratic	January 12, 1915	January 14, 1919	Bowie, Cass, Marion, Morris
36th	Robert P. Dorough	Democratic	January 14, 1919	January 9, 1923	Bowie, Cass, Marion, Morris
37th	Robert P. Dorough	Democratic	January 14, 1919	January 9, 1923	Bowie, Cass, Marion, Morris
38th	Pleasant A. Turner	Democratic	January 9, 1923	January 13, 1925	Bowie, Cass, Marion, Morris
39th	Lloyd E. Price	Democratic	January 13, 1925	January 8, 1929	Bowie, Cass, Marion, Morris, Titus
40th	Lloyd E. Price	Democratic	January 13, 1925	January 8, 1929	Bowie, Cass, Marion, Morris, Titus
41st	John W. E. H. Beck	Democratic	January 8, 1929	January 10, 1993	Bowie, Cass, Marion, Morris, Titus
42nd	John W. E. H. Beck	Democratic	January 8, 1929	January 10, 1993	Bowie, Cass, Marion, Morris, Titus
43rd	John W. E. H. Beck	Democratic	January 10, 1933	March 24, 1936	Bowie, Cass, Marion, Morris, Titus
44th	John W. E. H. Beck	Democratic	January 10, 1933	March 24, 1936	Bowie, Cass, Marion, Morris, Titus
44th	E. Harold Beck	Democratic	September 28, 1936	January 12, 1937	Bowie, Cass, Marion, Morris, Titus
45th	E. Harold Beck	Democratic	January 12, 1937	January 14, 1941	Bowie, Cass, Marion, Morris, Titus
46th	E. Harold Beck	Democratic	January 12, 1937	January 14, 1941	Bowie, Cass, Marion, Morris, Titus
47th	E. Harold Beck	Democratic	January 14, 1941	January 9, 1945	Bowie, Cass, Marion, Morris, Titus
48th	E. Harold Beck	Democratic	January 14, 1941	January 9, 1945	Bowie, Cass, Marion, Morris, Titus
49th	Howard A. Carney	Democratic	January 9, 1945	January 11, 1949	Bowie, Cass, Marion, Morris, Titus
50th	Howard A. Carney	Democratic	January 9, 1945	January 11, 1949	Bowie, Cass, Marion, Morris, Titus
51st	Howard A. Carney	Democratic	January 11, 1949	January 13, 1953	Bowie, Cass, Marion, Morris, Titus
52nd	Howard A. Carney	Democratic	January 11, 1949	January 13, 1953	Bowie, Cass, Marion, Morris, Titus
53rd	A. M. Aikin, Jr.	Democratic	January 13, 1953	January 11, 1955	Bowie, Cass, Delta, Franklin, Hopkins, Lamar, Marion, Morris, Red River, Titus
54th	A. M. Aikin, Jr.	Democratic	January 11, 1955	January 13, 1959	Bowie, Cass, Delta, Franklin, Hopkins, Lamar, Marion, Morris, Red River, Titus
55th	A. M. Aikin, Jr.	Democratic	January 11, 1955	January 13, 1959	Bowie, Cass, Delta, Franklin, Hopkins, Lamar, Marion, Morris, Red River, Titus
56th	A. M. Aikin, Jr.	Democratic	January 13, 1959	January 8, 1963	Bowie, Cass, Delta, Franklin, Hopkins, Lamar, Marion, Morris, Red River, Titus
57th	A. M. Aikin, Jr.	Democratic	January 13, 1959	January 8, 1963	Bowie, Cass, Delta, Franklin, Hopkins, Lamar, Marion, Morris, Red River, Titus
58th	A. M. Aikin, Jr.	Democratic	January 8, 1963	January 10, 1967	Bowie, Cass, Delta, Franklin, Hopkins, Lamar, Marion, Morris, Red River, Titus
59th	A. M. Aikin, Jr.	Democratic	January 8, 1963	January 10, 1967	Bowie, Cass, Delta, Franklin, Hopkins, Lamar, Marion, Morris, Red River, Titus
60th	A. M. Aikin, Jr.	Democratic	January 10, 1967	January 14, 1969	Bowie, Camp, Cass, Delta, Fannin, Franklin, Harrison, Hopkins, Lamar, Marion, Morris, Red River, Titus
61st	A. M. Aikin, Jr.	Democratic	January 14, 1969	January 9, 1973	Bowie, Camp, Cass, Delta, Fannin, Franklin, Harrison, Hopkins, Lamar, Marion, Morris, Red River, Titus
62nd	A. M. Aikin, Jr.	Democratic	January 14, 1969	January 9, 1973	Bowie, Camp, Cass, Delta, Fannin, Franklin, Harrison, Hopkins, Lamar, Marion, Morris, Red River, Titus
63rd	A. M. Aikin, Jr.	Democratic	January 9, 1973	January 14, 1975	Bowie, Camp, Cass, Delta, Fannin, Franklin, Grayson, Harrison, Hopkins, Lamar, Marion, Morris, Red River, Titus
64th	A. M. Aikin, Jr.	Democratic	January 14, 1975	January 9, 1979	Bowie, Camp, Cass, Delta, Fannin, Franklin, Grayson, Harrison, Hopkins, Lamar, Marion, Morris, Red River, Titus
65th	A. M. Aikin, Jr.	Democratic	January 14, 1975	January 9, 1979	Bowie, Camp, Cass, Delta, Fannin, Franklin, Grayson, Harrison, Hopkins, Lamar, Marion, Morris, Red River, Titus
66th	Vernon Edgar Howard	Democratic	January 9, 1979	January 11, 1983	Bowie, Camp, Cass, Delta, Fannin, Franklin, Grayson, Harrison, Hopkins, Lamar, Marion, Morris, Red River, Titus
67th	Vernon Edgar Howard	Democratic	January 9, 1979	January 11, 1983	Bowie, Camp, Cass, Delta, Fannin, Franklin, Grayson, Harrison, Hopkins, Lamar, Marion, Morris, Red River, Titus
68th	Vernon Edgar Howard	Democratic	January 11, 1983	January 8, 1985	Bowie, Camp, Cass, Delta, Franklin, Gregg, Harrison, Hopkins, Lamar, Marion, Morris, Panola, Red River, Titus, Upshur
69th	Vernon Edgar Howard	Democratic	January 8, 1985	September 18, 1986	Bowie, Camp, Cass, Delta, Franklin, Gregg, Harrison, Hopkins, Lamar, Marion, Morris, Panola, Red River, Titus, Upshur
69th	Richard M. Anderson	Democratic	September 18, 1986	January 10, 1989	Bowie, Camp, Cass, Delta, Franklin, Gregg, Harrison, Hopkins, Lamar, Marion, Morris, Panola, Red River, Titus, Upshur
70th	Richard M. Anderson	Democratic	September 18, 1986	January 10, 1989	Bowie, Camp, Cass, Delta, Franklin, Gregg, Harrison, Hopkins, Lamar, Marion, Morris, Panola, Red River, Titus, Upshur
71st	Bill Ratliff	Republican	January 10, 1989	January 12, 1993	Bowie, Camp, Cass, Delta, Franklin, Gregg, Harrison, Hopkins, Lamar, Marion, Morris, Panola, Red River, Titus, Upshur
72nd	Bill Ratliff	Republican	January 10, 1989	January 12, 1993	Bowie, Camp, Cass, Delta, Franklin, Gregg, Harrison, Hopkins, Lamar, Marion, Morris, Panola, Red River, Titus, Upshur
73rd	Bill Ratliff	Republican	January 12, 1993	January 10, 1995	Bowie, Camp, Cass, Delta, Franklin, Gregg, Harrison, Hopkins, Lamar, Marion, Morris, Panola, Red River, Rusk, Titus, Upshur
74th	Bill Ratliff	Republican	January 10, 1995	January 12, 1999	All of Bowie, Camp, Cass, Delta, Franklin, Gregg, Harrison, Hopkins, Lamar, Marion, Morris, Red River, Rusk, Titus, Upshur. Portion of Smith
75th	Bill Ratliff	Republican	January 10, 1995	January 12, 1999	All of Bowie, Camp, Cass, Delta, Franklin, Gregg, Harrison, Hopkins, Lamar, Marion, Morris, Red River, Rusk, Titus, Upshur. Portion of Smith
76th	Bill Ratliff	Republican	January 12, 1999	January 14, 2003	All of Bowie, Camp, Cass, Delta, Franklin, Gregg, Harrison, Hopkins, Lamar, Marion, Morris, Red River, Rusk, Titus, Upshur. Portion of Smith
77th	Bill Ratliff	Republican	January 12, 1999	January 14, 2003	All of Bowie, Camp, Cass, Delta, Franklin, Gregg, Harrison, Hopkins, Lamar, Marion, Morris, Red River, Rusk, Titus, Upshur. Portion of Smith
78th	Bill Ratliff	Republican	January 14, 2003	January 10, 2004	All of Bowie, Camp, Cass, Franklin, Gregg, Harrison, Lamar, Marion, Morris, Panola, Red River, Rusk, Titus, Upshur, Wood. Portion of Smith
78th	Kevin Eltife	Republican	March 5, 2004	January 9, 2007	All of Bowie, Camp, Cass, Franklin, Gregg, Harrison, Lamar, Marion, Morris, Panola, Red River, Rusk, Titus, Upshur, Wood. Portion of Smith
79th	Kevin Eltife	Republican	March 5, 2004	January 9, 2007	All of Bowie, Camp, Cass, Franklin, Gregg, Harrison, Lamar, Marion, Morris, Panola, Red River, Rusk, Titus, Upshur, Wood. Portion of Smith
80th	Kevin Eltife	Republican	January 9, 2007	January 11, 2011	All of Bowie, Camp, Cass, Franklin, Gregg, Harrison, Lamar, Marion, Morris, Panola, Red River, Rusk, Titus, Upshur, Wood. Portion of Smith
81st	Kevin Eltife	Republican	January 9, 2007	January 11, 2011	All of Bowie, Camp, Cass, Franklin, Gregg, Harrison, Lamar, Marion, Morris, Panola, Red River, Rusk, Titus, Upshur, Wood. Portion of Smith
82nd	Kevin Eltife	Republican	January 11, 2011	January 8, 2013	All of Bowie, Camp, Cass, Franklin, Gregg, Harrison, Lamar, Marion, Morris, Panola, Red River, Rusk, Titus, Upshur, Wood. Portion of Smith
83rd	Kevin Eltife	Republican	January 8, 2013	January 10, 2017	All of Bowie, Camp, Cass, Franklin, Gregg, Harrison, Lamar, Marion, Morris, Panola, Red River, Rusk, Titus, Upshur, Wood. Portion of Smith
84th	Kevin Eltife	Republican	January 8, 2013	January 10, 2017	All of Bowie, Camp, Cass, Franklin, Gregg, Harrison, Lamar, Marion, Morris, Panola, Red River, Rusk, Titus, Upshur, Wood. Portion of Smith
85th	Bryan Hughes	Republican	January 10, 2017	January 12, 2021	All of Bowie, Camp, Cass, Franklin, Gregg, Harrison, Lamar, Marion, Morris, Panola, Red River, Rusk, Titus, Upshur, Wood. Portion of Smith
86th	Bryan Hughes	Republican	January 10, 2017	January 12, 2021	All of Bowie, Camp, Cass, Franklin, Gregg, Harrison, Lamar, Marion, Morris, Panola, Red River, Rusk, Titus, Upshur, Wood. Portion of Smith
87th	Bryan Hughes	Republican	January 12, 2021	January 10, 2023	All of Bowie, Camp, Cass, Franklin, Gregg, Harrison, Lamar, Marion, Morris, Panola, Red River, Rusk, Titus, Upshur, Wood. Portion of Smith
88th	Bryan Hughes	Republican	January 10, 2023	January 14, 2025	Bowie, Camp, Cass, Delta, Fannin, Franklin, Gregg, Harrison, Hopkins, Lamar, Marion, Morris, Panola, Red River, Rusk, Smith, Titus, Upshur, Wood
89th	Bryan Hughes	Republican	January 14, 2025	present	Bowie, Camp, Cass, Delta, Fannin, Franklin, Gregg, Harrison, Hopkins, Lamar, Marion, Morris, Panola, Red River, Rusk, Smith, Titus, Upshur, Wood
