= 2012 United States Senate election in Texas =

- November 6, 2012
- Turnout: 64.8% (of registered voters); 49.7% (voting eligible)
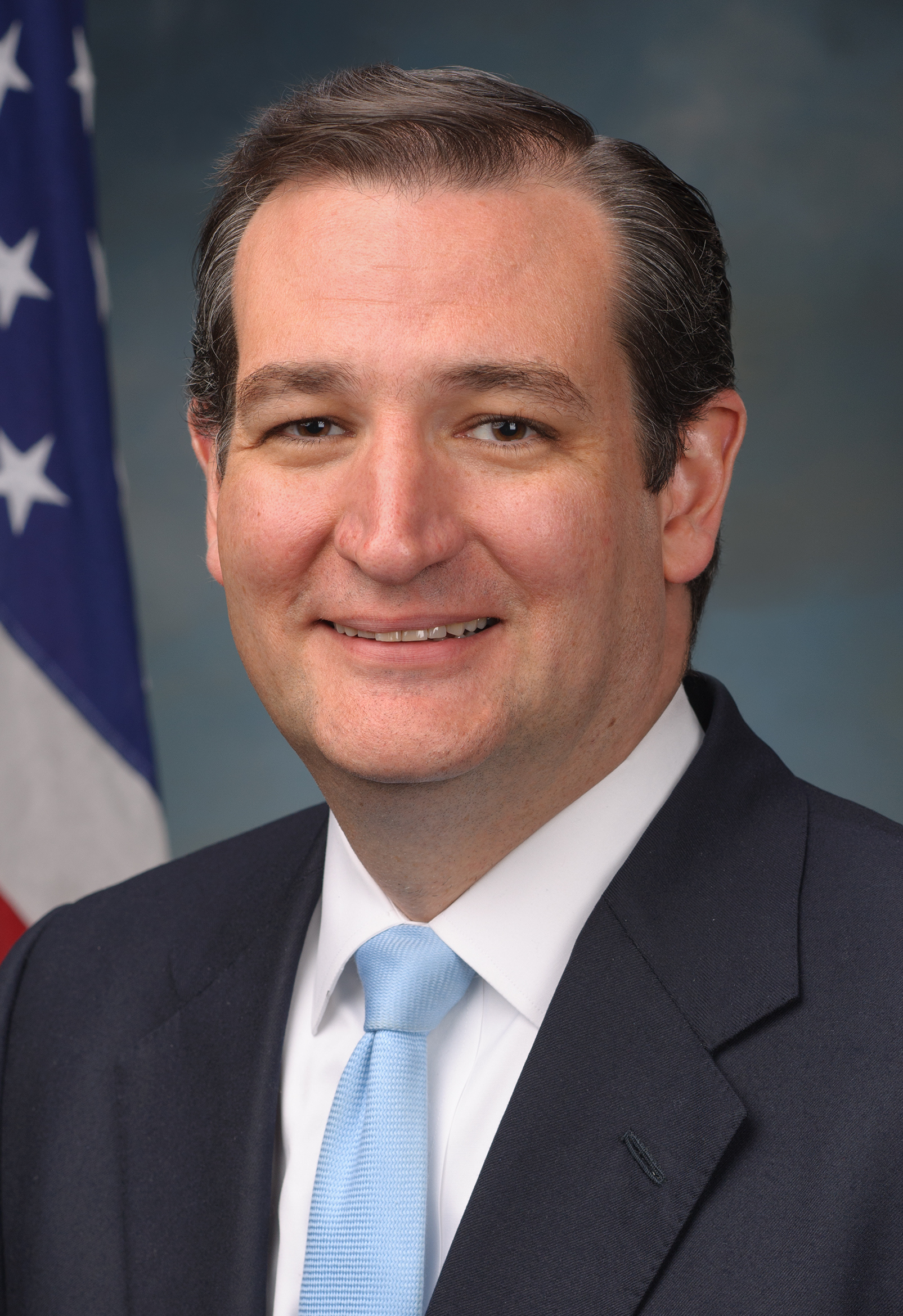

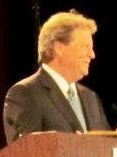
Nominee	Ted Cruz	Paul Sadler
Party	Republican	Democratic
Popular vote	4,440,137	3,194,927
Percentage	56.46%	40.62%
- Cruz: 40–50% 50–60% 60–70% 70–80% 80–90% >90% Sadler: 40–50% 50–60% 60–70% 70–80% 80–90% >90% No data
U.S. senator before election
Kay Bailey Hutchison
Republican
Elected U.S. Senator
Ted Cruz
Republican

The 2012 United States Senate election in Texas was held on November 6, 2012, along with elections to the United States Senate and United States House of Representatives in other states. Incumbent Republican U.S. senator Kay Bailey Hutchison decided to retire instead of running for reelection to a fourth full term. This was the first open election for this seat since 1957. (Note: Ralph Yarborough ran for reelection to a third full term in 1970, but lost in the Democratic primary to Lloyd Bentsen.)

Libertarian John Jay Myers was elected by nomination at the Texas Libertarian Party State Convention on June 8, 2012. After the first round of primary voting on May 29, 2012, a runoff was held on July 31, 2012, for both the Democratic Party and Republican Party. Former state representative Paul Sadler and former state solicitor general Ted Cruz respectively won the Democratic and Republican runoffs; Cruz won the general election by a wide margin.

== Background ==
In an interview with Texas Monthly published in December 2007, incumbent U.S. Senator Kay Bailey Hutchison stated that she would not seek reelection and might also resign from the Senate as early as 2009 to run for governor of Texas. After the 2008 elections, Hutchison formed an exploratory committee to run for the governorship in 2010. State Republican Party Chairman Cathie Adams later called upon Hutchison to clarify when she would vacate the Senate so that other Republican candidates could make preparations to run.

On December 4, 2008, Hutchison set up an exploratory committee, setting up a primary battle with incumbent Republican governor Rick Perry. Fellow Texas U.S. Senator and National Republican Senatorial Committee Chairman John Cornyn tried to convince Hutchison to stay in the Senate, for fear of losing the seat to the Democrats. On January 15, 2009, Hutchison transferred nearly all the money, approximately $8 million, from her federal campaign account to her gubernatorial exploratory committee. On November 13, 2009, Hutchison announced that she would not resign from the Senate seat until after the primary on March 2, 2010.

Hutchison lost the gubernatorial primary to Perry. On March 31, 2010, she announced her intention to serve out her third term. On January 13, 2011, after some discussion about whether she would change her mind, Hutchison announced she would not seek re-election in 2012.

=== Requirements for nomination ===
Texas requires a majority for nomination, as well as a second round runoff between the two candidates with the two highest pluralities if none win a majority on the first round. No candidate won a majority in either 2012 major party first round primary, so both parties had a runoff on July 31, 2012.

== Republican primary ==
=== Candidates ===
==== Declared ====
- Glenn Addison, funeral home owner
- Joe Agris, plastic surgeon
- Curt Cleaver, owner of a hotel sales, consulting, and management company
- Ted Cruz, former state solicitor general
- David Dewhurst, Texas lieutenant governor
- Ben Gambini
- Charles Holcomb, retired judge from the Texas Court of Criminal Appeals
- Craig James, sports commentator and former professional football player
- Tom Leppert, former mayor of Dallas
- Lela Pittenger, mediator

==== Withdrew ====
- Elizabeth Ames Jones, Texas railroad commissioner (ran for State Senate)
- Florence Shapiro, Texas state senator (later dropped out)
- Michael Williams, former Texas railroad commissioner (ran for U.S. House)
- Roger Williams, former Texas secretary of state (ran for U.S. House)

==== Declined ====
- Kay Bailey Hutchison, incumbent U.S. senator
- Dan Patrick, Texas state senator
- Robert Paul, doctor and son of Ron Paul, and brother of U.S. Senator Rand Paul
- Ron Paul, U.S. representative from Texas's 14th congressional district (ran for president)

=== Endorsements ===
Ted Cruz

Executive branch officials

- Edwin Meese, former United States attorney general

Statewide officials

- Sarah Palin, 2008 Republican vice presidential nominee and former governor of Alaska

U.S. senators

- Jim DeMint, United States senator from South Carolina
- Mike Lee, United States senator from Utah
- Rand Paul, United States senator from Kentucky
- Rick Santorum, former United States senator from Pennsylvania and 2012 Republican presidential candidate
- Pat Toomey, United States senator from Pennsylvania

U.S. representatives

- Justin Amash, MI-3 (2011–2021)
- Ron Paul, TX-14 and 2012 Republican presidential candidate

Party officials

- Cathie Adams, former chairman of the Republican Party of Texas
- Tina Benkiser, former chairman of the Republican Party of Texas
- George Strake, Jr., former chairman of the Republican Party of Texas

Individuals

- David Barton, founder of WallBuilders
- George P. Bush, co-founder of Hispanic Republicans of Texas and nephew of President George W. Bush
- Dr. James Dobson, psychologist, founder of Focus on the Family and Family Research Council
- Erick Erickson, conservative blogger and managing editor of the prominent blog site RedState
- Michael Farris, founder of the Home School Legal Defense Association
- Dr. Robert P. George, professor of Princeton University and former chairman of the National Organization for Marriage
- Sean Hannity, conservative talk radio and Fox News host
- Mark Levin, conservative talk radio host

Organizations

- Americans For Prosperity
- Citizens United
- Club for Growth, a fiscally conservative PAC
- Concerned Women for America
- Family Research Council
- FreedomWorks, conservative Tea Party group
- Gun Owners of America
- Republican Liberty Caucus
- Tea Party Conservative, conservative blog
- Tea Party Express
- Young Conservatives of Texas
David Dewhurst

Individuals

- Mike Huckabee, former governor of Arkansas and 2008 presidential candidate
- James Inhofe, United States senator from Oklahoma
- Rick Perry, governor of Texas and 2012 Republican presidential candidate
- Michael Reagan, conservative talk radio host
- Rick Scarborough, President of Vision America

Organizations

- BEEF-PAC
- Combined Law Enforcement Associations of Texas
- Independent Bankers Association of Texas
- National Association of Realtors
- Texas Agricultural Aviation Association
- Texas Alliance for Life
- Texas and Southwestern Cattle Raisers Association
- Texas Apartment Association
- Texas Association of Business
- Texas Association of Manufacturers
- Texas Department of Public Safety Officers Association
- Texas Farm Bureau Friends of Agriculture Fund
- Texas Hospital Association
- Texas Medical Association
- Texas Municipal Police Association
- Texas Oil and Gas PAC
- Texas Poultry Federation
- Texas Restaurant Association
- Texas Retailers Association
- Texas Right to Life
- Texas Society of Professional Engineers
- Texas State Association of Fire Fighters
- Texas State Lodge of the Fraternal Order of Police
- Texas Wildlife Association

Newspapers

- The Dallas Morning News

=== Polling ===
Poll source	Date(s) administered	Sample size	Margin of error	Ted Cruz	David Dewhurst	Elizabeth Ames Jones	Craig James	Tom Leppert	Lela Pittenger	Michael Williams	Roger Williams	Other	Undecided
Public Policy Polling	January 14–16, 2011	400	±4.9%	3%	23%	6%	6%	3%	—	3%	1%	55%	
UoT/Texas Tribune	February 11–17, 2011	374	±5.07%	3%	27%	2%	2%	–	—	5%	2%	59%	
UoT/Texas Tribune	May 11–18, 2011	388	±4.98%	2%	25%	1%	1%	4%	—	6%	2%	59%	
Texas Lyceum	May 24–31, 2011	147	±8.08%	1%	27%	2%	2%	3%	—	0%	4%	61%	
Public Policy Polling	September 15–18, 2011	400	±4.9%	12%	41%	7%	7%	6%	—	—	6%	21%	
UoT/Texas Tribune	October 19–26, 2011	800	±4.93%	10%	22%	2%	2%	5%	—	—	—	41%	
Baselice & Associates	October 31 – November 2, 2011	600	±4%	6%	50%	—	—	9%	—	—	2%	—	35%
Public Policy Polling	January 12–15, 2012	559	±4.2%	18%	36%	—	4%	7%	1%	—	—	3%	31%
UoT/Texas Tribune	February 8–15, 2012	366	±5.12%	27%	38%	—	7%	7%	1%	—	—	20%	—
Public Policy Polling	April 19–22, 2012	400	±4.9%	26%	38%	—	7%	8%	—	—	—	22%	
DWBS	April 27–30, 2012	400	±4.5%	16%	51%	—	2%	7%	—	—	—	—	24%
UoT/Texas Tribune	May 2012	274	±5.92%	31%	40%	—	4%	17%	3%	—	—	4%	2%
BOR/People Calling People	May 15–16, 2012	557	±4.2%	30%	43%	—	5%	14%	4%	—	—	3%	—
Public Policy Polling	May 22–23, 2012	482	±4.5%	29%	46%	—	5%	15%	—	—	—	2%	5%

* Commissioned by David Dewhurst

Hypothetical polling

With Dan Patrick

Poll source	Date(s) administered	Sample size	Margin of error	Ted Cruz	David Dewhurst	Elizabeth Ames Jones	Tom Leppert	Dan Patrick	Roger Williams	Other	Undecided
DWBS ^{+}	June 4–5, 2011	450	±4.62%	2%	—	4%	11%	19%	6%	—	58%
DWBS ^{+}	June 4–5, 2011	450	±4.62%	6%	—	—	—	29%	—	—	64%
Public Policy Polling	June 25–27, 2011	400	±4.9%	11%	40%	3%	5%	11%	2%	2%	26%

- ^{+} Commissioned by Dan Patrick

First round results map by county: Dewhurst: 30–40% 40–50% 50–60% 60–70% 70–80%; Cruz: 30–40% 40–50% 50–60% 60–70%; Tie No vote

=== Results ===
Republican primary results
Party	Candidate	Votes	%
Republican	David Dewhurst	627,731	44.63
Republican	Ted Cruz	480,558	34.16
Republican	Tom Leppert	187,900	13.36
Republican	Craig James	50,569	3.60
Republican	Glenn Addison	23,177	1.65
Republican	Lela Pittenger	18,143	1.29
Republican	Ben Gambini	7,225	0.51
Republican	Curt Cleaver	6,671	0.47
Republican	Joe Argis	4,674	0.33
Total votes		1,406,648	100

=== Runoff ===
2012 U.S. Senate Republican primary runoff in Texas
- July 31, 2012
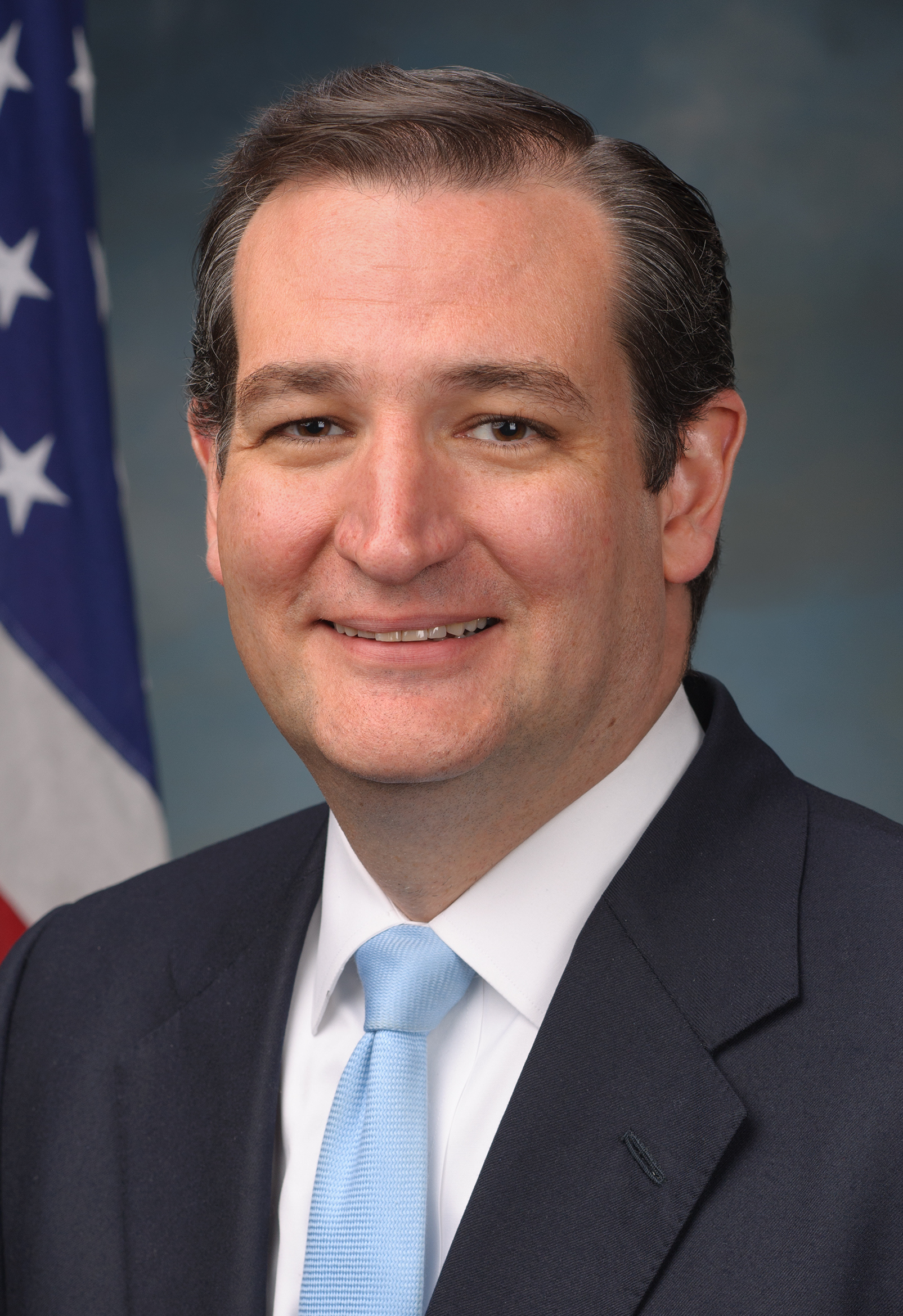

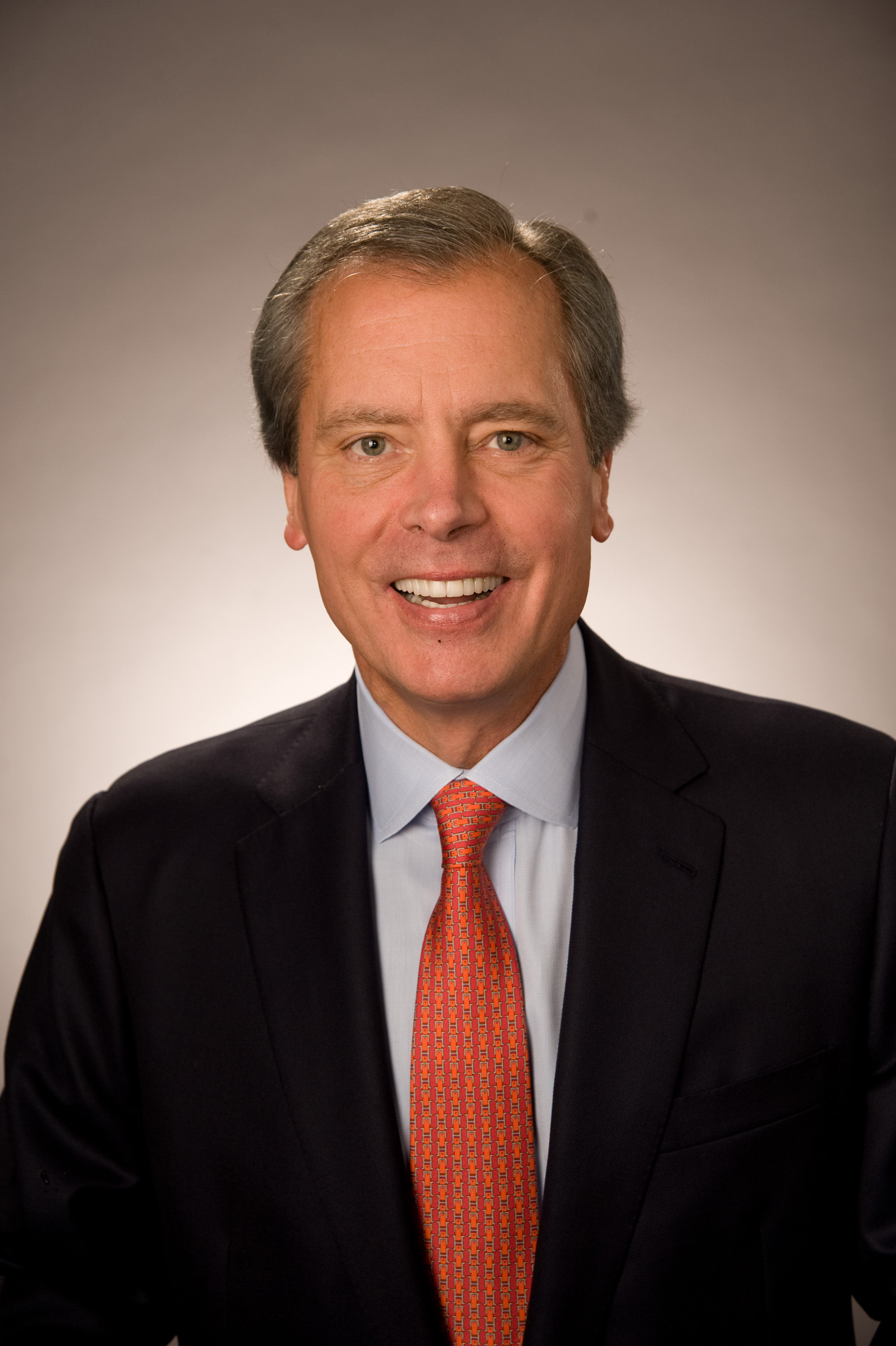
Nominee	Ted Cruz	David Dewhurst
Party	Republican	Republican
Popular vote	631,812	480,126
Percentage	56.8%	43.2%
- County results Cruz: 50–60% 60–70% 70–80% 80–90% >90% Dewhurst: 50–60% 60–70% 70–80% 80–90% Tie: 50% No vote
U.S. senator before election
Kay Bailey Hutchison
Republican
Elected U.S. Senator
Ted Cruz
Republican

With no candidate reaching the 50% required to win the nomination outright in the May primary, Dewhurst and Cruz advanced to the July runoff election.

During the two-month period between the May primary and the July 31 runoff, the campaign transformed from a localized contest into a nationalized proxy war between the Republican establishment and the burgeoning Tea Party movement. Despite trailing Dewhurst by 11 points in the initial primary, Cruz utilized the runoff delay to consolidate the "anti-establishment" vote. He framed the race as a choice between a "moderate" career politician and a "true conservative."

National organizations flooded the state with resources, with groups like Club for Growth and FreedomWorks spending millions of dollars on Cruz's behalf, funding a massive ground game and television advertising blitz. Cruz held high-energy events featuring Tea Party politicians Sarah Palin and Rand Paul, which helped dominate the media narrative and cast him as the underdog hero of the grassroots.

Facing a collapsing lead, Dewhurst’s campaign and the Texas Conservatives Fund (a pro-Dewhurst Super PAC) launched ads attacking Cruz's legal career. They specifically targeted his work for a Chinese company in a patent lawsuit, attempting to paint him as "un-Texan." Cruz responded by highlighting Dewhurst's record as lieutenant governor, accusing him of allowing state spending to grow and being "timid" on conservative priorities.

While Dewhurst led Cruz by a 25 percentage point margin in hypothetical 1-on-1 polls taken just before the May election, Cruz had jumped out to a sizeable lead by the month of July.

==== Debates ====
The runoff featured several televised debates where the candidates clashed directly. Cruz, a champion collegiate debater, was widely perceived to have performed well, using the platforms to challenge Dewhurst's conservative credentials. Dewhurst often found himself on the defensive, struggling to distance himself from the "establishment" label in a year when Republican primary voters were seeking radical change.

==== Polling ====
Poll source	Date(s) administered	Sample size	Margin of error	Ted Cruz	David Dewhurst	Undecided
Public Policy Polling	May 22–23, 2012	482	±4.5%	34%	59%	7%
Wenzel Strategies	July 10–11, 2012	600	±4%	47%	38%	14%
Public Policy Polling	July 10–11, 2012	468	±4.5%	49%	44%	7%
Public Policy Polling	July 28–29, 2012	665	±3.8%	52%	42%	6%

==== Results ====
Republican runoff results
Party	Candidate	Votes	%
Republican	Ted Cruz	631,812	56.82
Republican	David Dewhurst	480,126	43.18
Total votes		1,111,938	100

== Democratic primary ==
=== Candidates ===
==== Filed ====
- Addie Allen, disaster assistance employee for the Department of Homeland Security
- Sean Hubbard, businessman
- Paul Sadler, attorney and former state representative
- Grady Yarbrough, retired teacher

==== Withdrew ====
- Daniel Boone, retired Air Force colonel (ran for U.S. House)
- Jason Gibson, president of the Houston Trial Lawyers Association (filed, but dropped out)
- Ricardo Sanchez, former United States Army lieutenant general (dropped out)

==== Declined ====
- Julian Castro, mayor of San Antonio
- Adrian Garcia, Harris County sheriff
- Ron Kirk, U.S. trade representative and former mayor of Dallas
- Nick Lampson, former U.S. representative
- John Sharp, former Texas comptroller of public accounts
- Leticia Van de Putte, Texas state senator
- Bill White, former mayor of Houston, originally announced that he would be running for the seat when it is vacated by Hutchison. On December 4, 2009, White announced that he was running for governor instead. After receiving the Democratic nomination for governor and losing the general election, White declared on November 15, 2010, that he would not run for the U.S. Senate in 2012.

=== Polling ===
Poll source	Date(s) administered	Sample size	Margin of error	Addie Allen	Sean Hubbard	Paul Sadler	Grady Yarbrough	Others
University of Texas/Texas Tribune	May 2012	234	±6.41%	22%	22%	35%	12%	Don't know (9%)

Hypothetical polling

Poll source	Date(s) administered	Sample size	Margin of error	Addie Allen	Daniel Boone	Sean Hubbard	John Morton	Paul Sadler	Others
University of Texas/Texas Tribune	February 8–15, 2012	255	±6.14%	10%	10%	12%	3%	10%	Other (55%)

Poll source	Date(s) administered	Sample size	Margin of error	Chris Bell	Chet Edwards	Sylvia Garcia	Ricardo Sanchez	John Sharp	Others
Texas Lyceum	May 24–31, 2011	103	±9.66%	9%	6%	5%	6%	6%	Haven't thought much about it (64%)
University of Texas/Texas Tribune	May 11–18, 2011	252	±6.17%	7%	11%	–	14%	6%	Don't know (63%)
University of Texas, Austin	February 11–17, 2011	297	±5.69%	16%	13%	–	–	12%	Don't know (59%)

Initial round results by county: Sadler: Sadler—70–80%; Sadler—60–70%; Sadler—50–60%; Sadler—40–50%; Sadler—30–40%; Sadler—20–30%; Yarbrough: Yarbrough—70–80%; Yarbrough—60–70%; Yarbrough—50–60%; Yarbrough—40–50%; Yarbrough—30–40%; Yarbrough—20–30%; Allen: Allen—60–70%; Allen—30–40%; Allen—20–30%; Hubbard: Hubbard—30–40%; Hubbard—20–30%; Tie: Tie; No vote: No vote

=== Results ===
Democratic primary results
Party	Candidate	Votes	%
Democratic	Paul Sadler	174,772	35.13
Democratic	Grady Yarbrough	128,746	25.88
Democratic	Addie Allen	113,935	22.90
Democratic	Sean Hubbard	80,034	16.09
Total votes		497,487	100

Runoff results by county Sadler: Sadler—>90%; Sadler—80–90%; Sadler—70–80%; Sadler—60–70%; Sadler—50–60%; Tie: Tie; Yarbrough: Yarbrough—50–60%; Yarbrough—60–70%; Yarbrough—70–80%; Yarbrough—>90%; No vote: No vote

=== Runoff ===
Democratic runoff results
Party	Candidate	Votes	%
Democratic	Paul Sadler	148,940	63.03
Democratic	Grady Yarbrough	87,365	36.97
Total votes		236,305	100

== Libertarian Party nomination ==
The Libertarian Party was qualified for the ballot (based on its 2010 performance at the polls). The Texas Libertarian Party nominated John Jay Myers as its Senate candidate, using approval voting on June 9 at the state convention in Fort Worth. The nominating process followed a two-round debate featuring six candidates for the nomination.

=== Candidates ===
- Robert Butler
- Wayne Huffman
- Scott Jameson
- John Jay Myers, restaurant owner
- S. Ropal Raju
- Jon Roland

=== Results ===
Libertarian convention approval vote
Party	Candidate	Votes	%
Libertarian	John Jay Myers	97	78.9
Libertarian	Scott Jameson	28	22.8
Libertarian	John Roland	27	21.9
Libertarian	Robert Butler	19	15.4
Libertarian	S. Ropal Raju	3	2.4
Libertarian	Wayne Huffman	2	1.6
Total votes		176	143
Total ballots		123	1.431

== Green Party nomination ==
The Green Party of Texas reported two candidates pre-selected at the June 9 convention: David B. Collins and Victoria Ann Zabaras. Collins was ultimately nominated.

== General election ==
=== Candidates ===
- Chris Tina Bruce (independent)
- Mike Champion (independent)
- David Collins (Green), IT service desk analyst
- Ted Cruz (Republican), former state solicitor general
- John Jay Myers (Libertarian), restaurant owner
- Paul Sadler (Democratic), former state representative

=== Debates ===
- Complete video of debate, October 2, 2012 - C-SPAN
- Complete video of debate, October 19, 2012 - C-SPAN

=== Fundraising ===
Candidate (party)	Receipts	Disbursements	Cash on hand	Debt
Ted Cruz (R)	$9,053,212	$7,600,914	$1,452,297	$795,000
Paul Sadler (D)	$139,197	$108,442	$30,753	$12,197
John Jay Myers (L)	$6,139	$547	$5,591	$0
Source: Federal Election Commission

=== Top contributors ===
Paul Sadler	Contribution	Ted Cruz	Contribution
Communications Workers of America	$5,000	Club for Growth	$659,777
International Brotherhood of Electrical Workers	$5,000	Senate Conservatives Fund	$200,549
International Association of Machinists and Aerospace Workers	$5,000	Morgan, Lewis & Bockius	$41,600
United Transportation Union	$5,000	Goldman Sachs	$40,750
Velvin Oil Co	$5,000	RE Janes Gravel Co	$37,500
3-D Secure	$2,500	Woodforest National Bank	$37,000
American Federation of Teachers	$2,500	Jones Day	$34,900
Brotherhood of Locomotive Engineers	$2,500	Bartlit, Beck, Herman, Palenchar & Scott	$36,350
Galyean Lp	$2,500	Baker Botts	$32,313
University of Houston	$2,500	Crow Holdings	$30,000

=== Top industries ===
Paul Sadler	Contribution	Ted Cruz	Contribution
Industrial unions	$15,000	Republican/Conservative	$825,098
Lawyers/law firms	$9,000	Lawyers/law firms	$551,662
Transportation unions	$7,500	Retired	$437,961
Retired	$7,500	Oil and gas	$325,850
Public sector unions	$2,500	Financial institutions	$305,110
Financial institutions	$2,500	Real estate	$240,300
Education	$2,500	Leadership PACs	$235,549
Candidate committees	$2,000	Misc finance	$185,700
Lobbyists	$1,000	Health professionals	$155,880
Civil servants/public officials	$500	Misc business	$148,874

=== Predictions ===
Source	Ranking	As of
The Cook Political Report	Solid R	November 1, 2012
Sabato's Crystal Ball	Safe R	November 5, 2012
Rothenberg Political Report	Safe R	November 2, 2012
Real Clear Politics	Safe R	November 5, 2012

=== Polling ===
Poll source	Date(s) administered	Sample size	Margin of error	Ted Cruz (R)	Paul Sadler (D)	John Jay Myers (L)	Undecided
Public Policy Polling	January 12–15, 2012	700	±3.7%	41%	31%	—	28%
Public Policy Polling	April 19–22, 2012	591	±4.0%	44%	34%	—	22%
Frederick Polling	September 2012	700	±3.7%	49%	32%	6%	14%
YouGov	September 14, 2012	1,201	±2.8%	50%	31%	—	19%
Texas Lyceum	September 10–26, 2012	1,175	±2.83%	50%	24%	—	26%
University of Texas/Texas Tribune	October 15–20, 2012	540	±4.22%	54%	39%	—	7%

Hypothetical polling

with David Dewhurst

Poll source	Date(s) administered	Sample size	Margin of error	David Dewhurst (R)	Paul Sadler (D)	Other	Undecided
Public Policy Polling	January 12–15, 2012	700	±3.7%	49%	31%	—	20%
Public Policy Polling	April 19–22, 2012	591	±4.0%	49%	35%	—	16%

with Julian Castro

Poll source	Date(s) administered	Sample size	Margin of error	David Dewhurst (R)	Julian Castro (D)	Other	Undecided
Public Policy Polling	January 14–16, 2011	892	±3.3	53%	25%	—	23%

Poll source	Date(s) administered	Sample size	Margin of error	Elizabeth Ames Jones (R)	Julian Castro (D)	Other	Undecided
Public Policy Polling	January 14–16, 2011	892	±3.3	48%	27%	—	25%

Poll source	Date(s) administered	Sample size	Margin of error	Tom Leppert (R)	Julian Castro (D)	Other	Undecided
Public Policy Polling	January 14–16, 2011	892	±3.3	48%	25%	—	27%

Poll source	Date(s) administered	Sample size	Margin of error	Michael Williams (R)	Julian Castro (D)	Other	Undecided
Public Policy Polling	January 14–16, 2011	892	±3.3	45%	26%	—	29%

with Chet Edwards

Poll source	Date(s) administered	Sample size	Margin of error	Ted Cruz (R)	Chet Edwards (D)	Other	Undecided
Public Policy Polling	September 15–18, 2011	569	±4.1%	37%	33%	—	30%

Poll source	Date(s) administered	Sample size	Margin of error	David Dewhurst (R)	Chet Edwards (D)	Other	Undecided
Public Policy Polling	January 14–16, 2011	892	±3.3%	50%	31%	—	19%
Public Policy Polling	September 15–18, 2011	569	±4.1%	43%	35%	—	22%

Poll source	Date(s) administered	Sample size	Margin of error	Tom Leppert (R)	Chet Edwards (D)	Other	Undecided
Public Policy Polling	January 14–16, 2011	892	±3.3%	46%	30%	—	24%
Public Policy Polling	September 15–18, 2011	569	±4.1%	39%	33%	—	28%

Poll source	Date(s) administered	Sample size	Margin of error	Elizabeth Ames Jones (R)	Chet Edwards (D)	Other	Undecided
Public Policy Polling	January 14–16, 2011	892	±3.3%	44%	31%	—	25%

Poll source	Date(s) administered	Sample size	Margin of error	Michael Williams (R)	Chet Edwards (D)	Other	Undecided
Public Policy Polling	January 14–16, 2011	892	±3.3	42%	31%	—	27%

with Sean Hubbard

Poll source	Date(s) administered	Sample size	Margin of error	Ted Cruz (R)	Sean Hubbard (D)	Other	Undecided
Public Policy Polling	April 19–22, 2012	591	±4.0%	43%	33%	—	25%
Public Policy Polling	January 12–15, 2012	700	±3.7%	39%	29%	—	31%

Poll source	Date(s) administered	Sample size	Margin of error	David Dewhurst (R)	Sean Hubbard (D)	Other	Undecided
Public Policy Polling	April 19–22, 2012	591	±4.0%	50%	35%	—	15%
Public Policy Polling	January 12–15, 2012	700	±3.7%	48%	31%	—	22%

Poll source	Date(s) administered	Sample size	Margin of error	Craig James (R)	Sean Hubbard (D)	Other	Undecided
Public Policy Polling	April 19–22, 2012	591	±4.0%	41%	35%	—	24%
Public Policy Polling	January 12–15, 2012	700	±3.7%	40%	32%	—	27%

Poll source	Date(s) administered	Sample size	Margin of error	Tom Leppert (R)	Sean Hubbard (D)	Other	Undecided
Public Policy Polling	April 19–22, 2012	591	±4.0%	44%	34%	—	22%
Public Policy Polling	January 12–15, 2012	700	±3.7%	43%	22%	—	26%

with Tommy Lee Jones

Poll source	Date(s) administered	Sample size	Margin of error	Ted Cruz (R)	Tommy Lee Jones (D)	Other	Undecided
Public Policy Polling	June 25–27, 2011	795	±3.5	37%	38%	—	25%

Poll source	Date(s) administered	Sample size	Margin of error	David Dewhurst (R)	Tommy Lee Jones (D)	Other	Undecided
Public Policy Polling	June 25–27, 2011	795	±3.5	43%	39%	—	18%

Poll source	Date(s) administered	Sample size	Margin of error	Tom Leppert (R)	Tommy Lee Jones (D)	Other	Undecided
Public Policy Polling	June 25–27, 2011	795	±3.5	38%	37%	—	26%

with Paul Sadler

Poll source	Date(s) administered	Sample size	Margin of error	Craig James (R)	Paul Sadler (D)	Other	Undecided
Public Policy Polling	April 19–22, 2012	591	±4.0%	40%	36%	—	24%
Public Policy Polling	January 12–15, 2012	700	±3.7%	42%	32%	—	26%

Poll source	Date(s) administered	Sample size	Margin of error	Tom Leppert (R)	Paul Sadler (D)	Other	Undecided
Public Policy Polling	April 19–22, 2012	591	±4.0%	44%	33%	—	22%
Public Policy Polling	January 12–15, 2012	700	±3.7%	44%	31%	—	25%

with Ricardo Sanchez

Poll source	Date(s) administered	Sample size	Margin of error	Ted Cruz (R)	Ricardo Sanchez (D)	Other	Undecided
Public Policy Polling	September 15–18, 2011	569	±4.1%	42%	31%	—	27%
Public Policy Polling	June 25–27, 2011	795	±3.5%	41%	32%	—	27%

Poll source	Date(s) administered	Sample size	Margin of error	David Dewhurst (R)	Ricardo Sanchez (D)	Other	Undecided
Public Policy Polling	September 15–18, 2011	569	±4.1%	47%	32%	—	22%
Public Policy Polling	June 25–27, 2011	795	±3.5%	45%	37%	—	18%

Poll source	Date(s) administered	Sample size	Margin of error	Tom Leppert (R)	Ricardo Sanchez (D)	Other	Undecided
Public Policy Polling	September 15–18, 2011	569	±4.1%	41%	32%	—	27%
Public Policy Polling	June 25–27, 2011	795	±3.5%	38%	35%	—	27%

with John Sharp

Poll source	Date(s) administered	Sample size	Margin of error	Greg Abbott (R)	John Sharp (D)	Other	Undecided
University of Texas, Austin	February 24 – March 6, 2009	715	±3.66%	44%	36%	—	19%
Public Policy Polling	February 18–20, 2009	1,409	±2.6%	36%	28%	—	36%

Poll source	Date(s) administered	Sample size	Margin of error	Ted Cruz (R)	John Sharp (D)	Other	Undecided
Public Policy Polling	June 25–27, 2011	795	±3.5	40%	36%	—	25%

Poll source	Date(s) administered	Sample size	Margin of error	David Dewhurst (R)	John Sharp (D)	Other	Undecided
Public Policy Polling	June 25–27, 2011	795	±3.5	43%	37%	—	19%
Public Policy Polling	January 14–16, 2011	892	±3.3	49%	31%	—	19%
University of Texas, Austin	February 24 – March 6, 2009	715	±3.66%	34%	33%	—	33%
Public Policy Polling	February 18–20, 2009	1,409	±2.6%	42%	36%	—	22%

Poll source	Date(s) administered	Sample size	Margin of error	Elizabeth Ames Jones (R)	John Sharp (D)	Other	Undecided
Public Policy Polling	January 14–16, 2011	892	±3.3	44%	30%	—	26%
University of Texas, Austin	February 24 – March 6, 2009	715	±3.66%	33%	31%	—	37%

Poll source	Date(s) administered	Sample size	Margin of error	Tom Leppert (R)	John Sharp (D)	Other	Undecided
Public Policy Polling	June 25–27, 2011	795	±3.5	39%	38%	—	23%
Public Policy Polling	January 14–16, 2011	892	±3.3	42%	30%	—	28%

Poll source	Date(s) administered	Sample size	Margin of error	Florence Shapiro (R)	John Sharp (D)	Other	Undecided
University of Texas, Austin	February 24 – March 6, 2009	715	±3.66%	31%	32%	—	37%
Public Policy Polling	February 18–20, 2009	1,409	±2.6	34%	37%	—	29%

Poll source	Date(s) administered	Sample size	Margin of error	Roger Williams (R)	John Sharp (D)	Other	Undecided
University of Texas, Austin	February 24 – March 6, 2009	715	±3.66%	29%	33%	—	38%

with Bill White

Poll source	Date(s) administered	Sample size	Margin of error	Greg Abbott (R)	Bill White (D)	Other	Undecided
University of Texas, Austin	February 24 – March 6, 2009	715	±3.66%	37%	28%	—	36%
Public Policy Polling	February 18–20, 2009	1,409	±2.6%	42%	36%	—	22%

Poll source	Date(s) administered	Sample size	Margin of error	David Dewhurst (R)	Bill White (D)	Other	Undecided
University of Texas, Austin	February 24 – March 6, 2009	715	±3.66%	38%	36%	—	26%
Public Policy Polling	February 18–20, 2009	1,409	±2.6%	42%	37%	—	21%

Poll source	Date(s) administered	Sample size	Margin of error	Elizabeth Ames Jones (R)	Bill White (D)	Other	Undecided
University of Texas, Austin	February 24 – March 6, 2009	715	±3.66%	33%	30%	—	37%

Poll source	Date(s) administered	Sample size	Margin of error	Florence Shapiro (R)	Bill White (D)	Other	Undecided
University of Texas, Austin	February 24 – March 6, 2009	715	±3.66%	32%	31%	—	37%
Public Policy Polling	February 18–20, 2011	1,409	±2.6	37%	36%	—	27%

Poll source	Date(s) administered	Sample size	Margin of error	Michael Williams (R)	Bill White (D)	Other	Undecided
University of Texas, Austin	February 24 – March 6, 2009	715	±3.66%	35%	31%	—	34%

Poll source	Date(s) administered	Sample size	Margin of error	Roger Williams (R)	Bill White (D)	Other	Undecided
University of Texas, Austin	February 24 – March 6, 2009	715	±3.66%	31%	33%	—	38%

Republican primary (when asked specifically, if Dewhurst were not running)

Poll source	Date(s) administered	Sample size	Margin of error	Glenn Addison	Ted Cruz	Elizabeth Ames Jones	Tom Leppert	Dan Patrick	Lela Pittenger	Roger Williams
Public Policy Polling	June 25–27, 2011	400	±4.9%	4%	16%	11%	12%	13%	0%	3%

=== Results ===
2012 United States Senate election in Texas
Party	Candidate	Votes	%	±%
Republican	Ted Cruz	4,440,137	56.46%	−5.23%
Democratic	Paul Sadler	3,194,927	40.62%	+4.58%
Libertarian	John Jay Myers	162,354	2.06%	−0.20%
Green	David Collins	67,404	0.86%	N/A
Total votes		7,864,822	100.0%	N/A
Republican hold				

==== Counties that flipped from Republican to Democratic ====
- Bexar (largest city: San Antonio)
- Cameron (largest community: Brownsville)
- Jefferson (largest city: Beaumont)
- Frio (largest municipality: Pearsall)
- Kleberg (largest municipality: Kingsville)
- La Salle (largest municipality: Cotulla)
- Val Verde (largest municipality: Del Rio)
- Culberson (largest municipality: Van Horn)
- Dallas (largest city: Dallas)

==== By congressional district ====
Cruz won 25 of 36 congressional districts, including one that elected a Democrat.

District	Cruz	Sadler	Representative
1st	67.74%	30.55%	Louie Gohmert
2nd	62.92%	34.35%	Ted Poe
3rd	63.52%	33.52%	Sam Johnson
4th	69.79%	27.6%	Ralph Hall
5th	62.41%	35.41%	Jeb Hensarling
6th	57.16%	40.12%	Joe Barton
7th	59.63%	37.73%	John Culberson
8th	75.64%	21.88%	Kevin Brady
9th	21.91%	76.35%	Al Green
10th	57.76%	38.76%	Michael McCaul
11th	77.32%	19.92%	Mike Conaway
12th	65.74%	31.22%	Kay Granger
13th	78.17%	19.12%	Mac Thornberry
14th	57.98%	39.8%	Randy Weber
15th	42.74%	54.55%	Rubén Hinojosa
16th	37.02%	59.66%	Beto O'Rourke
17th	59.36%	37.24%	Bill Flores
18th	23.51%	74.37%	Sheila Jackson Lee
19th	72.65%	24.37%	Randy Neugebauer
20th	39.33%	57.47%	Joaquín Castro
21st	59.38%	37.32%	Lamar Smith
22nd	62.02%	35.74%	Pete Olson
23rd	51.67%	45.28%	Pete Gallego
24th	59.97%	36.88%	Kenny Marchant
25th	58.07%	37.79%	Roger Williams
26th	66.74%	29.66%	Michael Burgess
27th	59.12%	38.11%	Blake Farenthold
28th	41.5%	55.14%	Henry Cuellar
29th	34.47%	63.27%	Gene Green
30th	20.58%	77.58%	Eddie Bernice Johnson
31st	58.13%	37.46%	John Carter
32nd	56.03%	41.03%	Pete Sessions
33rd	28.71%	68.96%	Marc Veasey
34th	41.71%	55.23%	Filemon Vela Jr.
35th	34.14%	61.38%	Lloyd Doggett
36th	71.03%	26.66%	Steve Stockman

== See also ==
- 2012 United States Senate elections
- 2012 United States House of Representatives elections in Texas
