= Is Miss Thing On? =

2025 album by Plasma

Live album by Plasma
- Released: November 7, 2025
- Recorded: July 28, 2025
- Venue: Joe's Pub (New York City)
- Genre: Musical theatre
- Length: 59:49
- Label: Joy Machine
- Producers: Alex Grippo; Benjamin Young; Jackie Huba; Plasma

Is Miss Thing On? is the debut album by American drag performer Plasma, released on November 7, 2025 by Joy Machine Records. The live album was recorded at Joe's Pub in New York City with the Benjamin Young Band. The lead single "That's Life" features J. Harrison Ghee.

== Composition ==
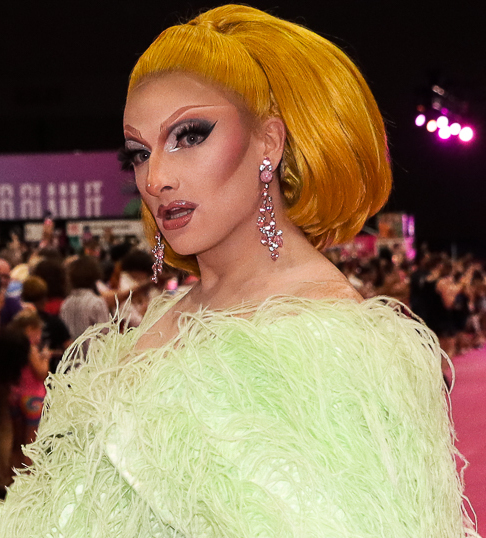
American drag performer Plasma at RuPaul's DragCon LA in 2024

Is Miss Thing On? is the debut album by American drag performer Plasma. The album was recorded at Joe's Pub in New York City on July 28, 2025. It features musical theatre classics, standards, and the original track "80 or Above", which was written by Plasma. Plasma is accompanied by the Benjamin Young Band, with band leader Benjamin Young on bass, Willis Edmundson on drums, Dabin Ryu on piano, Bryan Cowan and Nathan See on saxophone, Andrew Danforth on trombone and Robert Vega on trumpet. Is Miss Thing On? is produced by Plasma, Alex Grippo, Jackie Huba, and Benjamin Young.

== Promotion ==
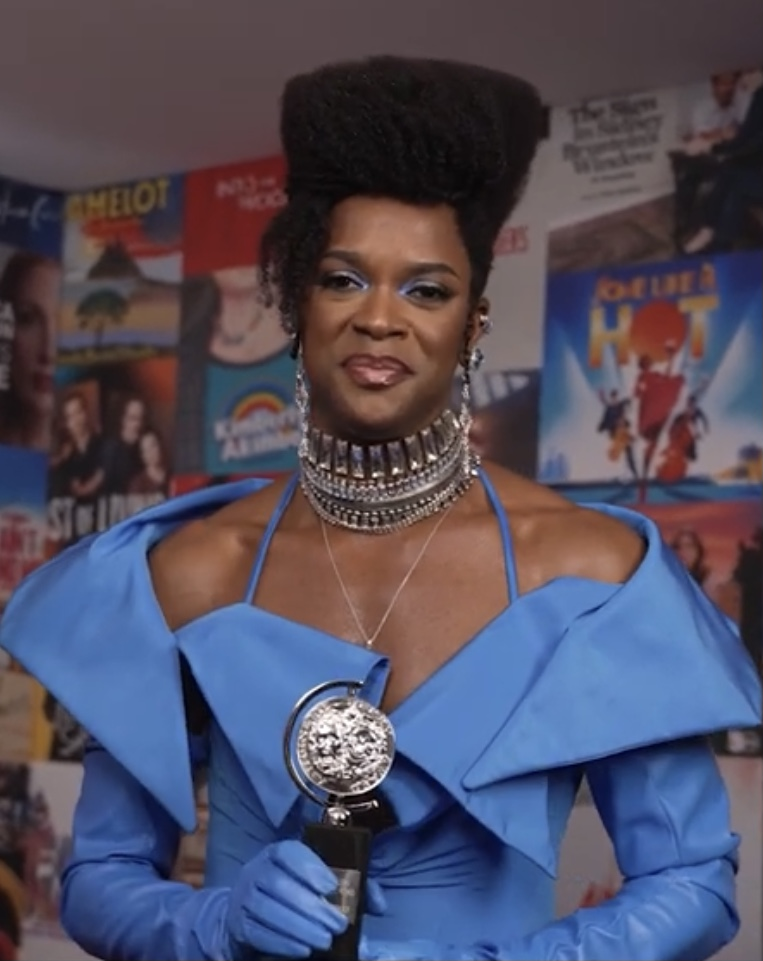
The lead single "That's Life" features J. Harrison Ghee (pictured in 2023)

In July 2025, media outlets reported on Plasma's plans to record a live album at Joe's Pub on July 28. The lead single "That's Life" is a duet with American musical theatre actor J. Harrison Ghee. It was released on October 10, 2025.

== Track listing ==
1. "Overture: Let Me Entertain You"
2. "Broadway Baby"
3. "Welcome"
4. "Thanks a Lot But No Thanks"
5. "Introductions & Explanations"
6. "More"
7. "A Love Letter to the Internet"
8. "Cry Me a River"
9. "A Schloon for the Gumpert"
10. "Thank You Barbra"
11. "Don't Rain on My Parade"
12. "I Drink a Lot: A Toast"
13. "80 or Above"
14. "Tony (and Grammy) winner J. Harrison Ghee!" (feat. J. Harrison Ghee)
15. "That's Life" (feat. J. Harrison Ghee)
16. "Acknowledgements"
17. "Misty"
18. "Parting Thoughts"
19. "Don't Take Your Love from Me"
20. "Encore: Everybody Say Gay!"
21. "I'm Beginning to See the Light"
