= Kevin Eltife =

American politician (born 1959)

President pro tempore of the Texas Senate
- In office June 1, 2015 – January 10, 2017
- Preceded by: Juan Hinojosa
- Succeeded by: Kel Seliger

Member of the Texas Senate from the 1st district
- In office September 2, 2004 – January 9, 2017
- Preceded by: Bill Ratliff
- Succeeded by: Bryan Hughes

Personal details
- Born: Kevin Paul Eltife; March 1, 1959 (age 67) Tyler, Texas, U.S.
- Party: Republican
- Spouse: Kelly
- Education: University of Texas, Austin (BBA)

Kevin Paul Eltife (born March 1, 1959) is an American businessman and former politician from Tyler, Texas. A Republican, served in the Texas Senate from 2004 through 2017. He was sworn in on August 15, 2004, after winning a special election to represent District 1. He declined to seek re-election in 2016 and was succeeded in office by fellow Republican Bryan Hughes.

== Early life and education ==
Eltife was born in Tyler, Texas, and grew up there. He is a Lebanese American; all four of his grandparents were born in Lebanon and immigrated to the United States. His father died when Kevin was not yet two years old.

== Business and political career ==
Eltife is the owner and operator of Eltife Properties, a commercial real estate company.

He first entered politics in 1991, when he ran for a city council seat. He subsequently served as mayor of Tyler for two terms (six years).

He defeated Paul Sadler in the special election for Texas Senate; in 2012, Sadler was the unsuccessful Democratic nominee against Ted Cruz for one of the two Texas seats in the United States Senate. The position opened when state Senator and former Lieutenant Governor Bill Ratliff of Mount Pleasant resigned with less than a year remaining in his state Senate term.

Eltife was a strong proponent of raising sales taxes and reducing property taxes. He wishes to use additional sales tax revenue to reduce the debt of the Texas Department of Transportation.

He was considered one of the most liberal of the nineteen (as of 2013) Texas Senate Republicans, along with Robert L. Duncan of Lubbock, Kel Seliger of Amarillo, Bob Deuell of Greenville, and John Carona of Dallas, according to an analysis by Mark P. Jones of the political science department at Rice University in Houston. Jones also found that these Republicans saw passage of 90 percent of the bills for which they voted. Of these five senators, Deuell lost a runoff election on May 27, 2014, and Carona was narrowly defeated for re-nomination on March 4. Duncan, meanwhile, resigned from the Senate to become chancellor of the Texas Tech University System.

In 2015, Eltife announced that he would not seek reelection to the Senate in 2016. He was succeeded in office by Republican state Representative Bryan Hughes of Mineola, who defeated Republican state Representative David Simpson of Longview in the Republican primary and automatically won the seat because there was no Democratic opponent.

In January 2017, Governor Greg Abbott appointed Eltife, along with two others, as a regent of the University of Texas System.

== Electoral history ==
=== 2006 ===
Texas general election, 2006: Senate District 1
| Party | Candidate | Votes | % | ±% |
|---|---|---|---|---|
| Republican | Kevin P. Eltife | 109,450 | 83.13 | +14.96 |
| Libertarian | Jason Albers | 22,211 | 16.87 | +16.87 |
| Majority | | 87,239 | 66.26 | +29.92 |
| Turnout | | 131,661 | | −21.23 |
| Republican hold | | | | |

=== 2004 ===
Special runoff election, 15 August 2004: Senate District 1, Unexpired term
| Party | Candidate | Votes | % | ±% |
|---|---|---|---|---|
| Republican | Kevin Eltife | 46,437 | 51.86 | '"`UNIQ−−ref−00000039−QINU`"'+15.85 |
| Democratic | Paul Sadler | 43,103 | 48.14 | +8.63 |
| Majority | | 3,334 | 3.72 | |
| Turnout | | 89,540 | | '"`UNIQ−−ref−0000003A−QINU`"'+29.38 |
| Republican hold | | | | |

Special election, 12 August 2004: Senate District 1, Unexpired term
| Party | Candidate | Votes | % | ±% |
|---|---|---|---|---|
| Republican | Kevin Eltife | 24,919 | 36.01 | |
| Republican | Bill Godsey | 502 | 0.73 | |
| Republican | Tommy Merritt | 14,786 | 21.36 | |
| Democratic | Paul Sadler | 27,339 | 39.50 | |
| Constitution | Daryl Ware | 480 | 0.69 | |
| Republican | Jerry Yost | 1,180 | 1.71 | |
| Turnout | | 69,206 | | |

Texas Senate
| Preceded by Bill Ratliff | Member of the Texas Senate from the 1st district 2004–2017 | Succeeded by Bryan Hughes |
| Preceded by Juan Hinojosa | President pro tempore of the Texas Senate; 2015–2017 | Succeeded by Kel Seliger |
