= Matt Rinaldi =

American politician (born 1975)

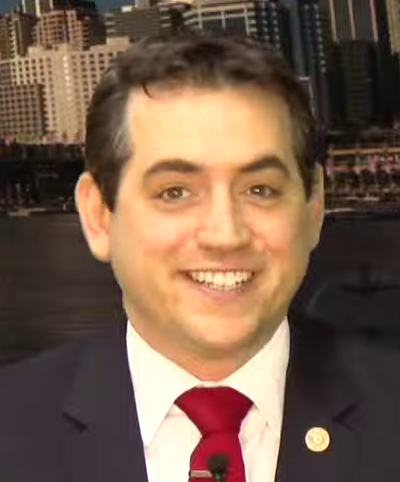
- Rinaldi in 2018

Chair of the Texas Republican Party
- In office July 11, 2021 – May 25, 2024
- Preceded by: Allen West
- Succeeded by: Abraham George

Member of the Texas House of Representatives from the 115th district
- In office January 13, 2015 – January 8, 2019
- Preceded by: Bennett Ratliff
- Succeeded by: Julie Johnson

Personal details
- Born: Matthew Daniel Rinaldi; April 11, 1975 (age 51) Bridgeport, Connecticut, U.S.
- Party: Republican
- Spouse: Corley Rinaldi
- Children: 1
- Education: James Madison University (BA); Boston University (JD)

Matthew Daniel Rinaldi (born April 11, 1975) is an American attorney and politician who served as chairman of the Republican Party of Texas from 2021 to 2024. Rinaldi was a member of the Texas House of Representatives for District 115 in Dallas County from 2015 to 2019 when he was defeated by Democrat Julie Johnson.

== Early life and education ==
Rinaldi was born in Bridgeport, Connecticut. He graduated from James Madison University in Harrisonburg, Virginia, at which he drew national attention for his successful effort to have the Pledge of Allegiance recited prior to meetings of the student government association. He graduated in 2001 with a Juris Doctor degree from Boston University School of Law.

== Professional career ==
After law school, Rinaldi became a litigation associate with the Dallas office of Gibson, Dunn & Crutcher. Rinaldi spent the next two decades working at different law firms but never made partner and never worked at any law firm for more than five years. After working at various Dallas law firm, Rinaldi worked part-time with various gigs until he began to work for a billionaire political donor.

== Political career ==
=== Texas House of Representatives ===
==== 2012 and 2014 Texas primaries ====
In 2012, Rinaldi placed third of five candidates in the Republican primary election for the 115th district of the Texas House of Representatives; the seat was open following the retirement of veteran legislator Jim Jackson. Of the top two vote-getters, Bennett Ratliff would win the Republican nomination in a run-off over Steve Nguyen, then go on to win the seat in November 2012.

On March 4, 2014, Rinaldi challenged incumbent Ratliff in the Texas Republican primary for the seat again, this time successfully; Rinaldi earned 4,167 votes (50.6 percent) to Ratliff's 4,075 votes (49.4 percent).

==== 84th legislative session and 2016 Texas primary ====
During the 84th Texas Legislature, Rinaldi was appointed to the Agriculture & Livestock committee and the Business & Industry committee. He joint- and co-authored successful pieces of legislation that were signed into law, including HB 11 (authorizing additional troopers for border security and strengthening smuggling laws) and HB 283 (increasing government transparency by requiring certain governmental bodies to make audio and video recordings of open meetings available online).

Rinaldi filed bills intended to eliminate or minimize the effects of the Robin Hood plan on Texas public school districts with HB 945 and HB 1411.

Rinaldi co-authored legislation that would repeal in-state tuition and end welfare benefits for undocumented immigrants as well as penalize businesses that knowingly hire undocumented immigrants.

Rinaldi was rated the most conservative member of the Texas House by a Rice University study that "[drew] on the 1,138 non-lopsided roll call votes taken during the 2015 regular session."

In the Republican primary held on March 1, 2016, Rinaldi and Ratliff would face off a third time, as Ratliff vied unsuccessfully to win back the House District 115 seat. Rinaldi earned 8,804 votes (53.45 percent) to Ratliff's 7,668 votes (46.55 percent). In the November 8 general election of that year, Rinaldi narrowly held on to the House seat, earning 29,987 votes (50.9 percent) over Democrat Dorotha M. Ocker's 28,939 (49.1 percent).

==== 85th legislative session ====
During the 85th Texas Legislature, Rinaldi was appointed to the Agriculture & Livestock committee and the Judiciary & Civil Jurisprudence committee.

Rinaldi was, according to The Dallas Morning News, "instrumental in strengthening the punishments in the sanctuary cities ban," and authored and passed into law measures that: remove from office public officials who adopt sanctuary city policies, require government contractors and subcontractors to use e-verify, revoke pensions of teachers convicted of committing sex crimes against students, allow churches to utilize volunteers to provide security services without risking heavy fines, and prohibit any taxpayer money from going to Planned Parenthood. He also re-introduced legislation he had previously proposed to end the Robin Hood school finance system.

In May 2017, Rinaldi called Immigrations and Customs Enforcement officers on protesters inside the Capitol building. Rinaldi claimed that he called ICE after seeing individuals holding protest signs indicating they were illegal immigrants. An altercation ensued; according to multiple Hispanic Democratic lawmakers, Rinaldi got into their faces during the dispute and cursed at them. Video shot from the House floor showed both Republicans and Democrats pushing each other. Rinaldi claimed that Representative Poncho Nevárez threatened his life during the incident, which Nevárez denied. Democratic lawmaker Justin Rodriguez claimed that Rinaldi threatened to "put a bullet in one of my colleagues’ heads"; Rinaldi did not deny making the statement, but claimed it was made in self-defense. Rinaldi's actions were widely seen as having a racial motivation. After the incident, state representative Ramon Romero Jr. said Rinaldi had "racially profiled every single person that was in the gallery today."

During Rinaldi's second term, he remained ranked as the most conservative legislator (tied with Briscoe Cain and Jonathan Stickland) in Austin according to a Rice University's study roll-call vote analysis drawing on 1,460 non-lopsided roll-call votes taken during the 2017 regular session. He was also named one of the Top 10 Legislators by the conservative advocacy group Empower Texans, as well as one of the Top 10 Worst Legislators by Texas Monthly. His voting record earned a 100 score from conservative advocacy group Texans for Fiscal Responsibility.

==== 2018 campaign ====
Rinaldi lost his state House seat in 2018. Rinaldi was unseated by Democrat Julie Johnson, whose campaign included volunteers who had been part of the ICE altercation at the Capitol in May 2017. Rinaldi earned 24,512 votes (43.21 percent) to Johnson's 32,214 votes (56.79 percent), the lowest vote percentage of any House incumbent in Dallas County that year.

=== Republican Party of Texas ===
Rinaldi was elected Chairman of the Republican Party of Texas on July 11, 2021, to replace outgoing chair, former Congressman Allen West. In his first weeks as chairman, Rinaldi had established a reputation of being more collegial than West had been, but also signaled an intent to challenge statewide Republican officials including Governor Greg Abbott. As state GOP chair, Rinaldi directly criticized elected Texas Republicans perceived by the grassroots faction within the state organization as not conservative enough.

Rinaldi announced he would not run for reelection as Texas GOP Chairman in 2024. He was succeeded by Abraham George, whom Rinaldi endorsed.

== Personal life ==
He and his wife Corley, married since 2010, have a son, Rush. They attend St. Ann Catholic Parish Roman Catholic Church in Coppell.

== Election history ==
2018

Texas General Election, 2018: State Representative District 115
Party	Candidate	Votes	%
Democratic	Julie Johnson	32,214	56.8
Republican	Matt Rinaldi	24,512	43.2
Democratic gain from Republican			

2016

Texas General Election, 2016: State Representative District 115
Party	Candidate	Votes	%
Republican	Matt Rinaldi	29,987	50.9
Democratic	Dorotha Ocker	28,939	49.1
Republican hold			

2014

Texas General Election, 2014: State Representative District 115
Party	Candidate	Votes	%
Republican	Matt Rinaldi	16,999	57.1
Democratic	Paul K. Stafford	11,767	39.5
Libertarian	Kim Kelley	999	3.4
Republican hold			

Party political offices
Preceded by Allen West	Chair of the Texas Republican Party; 2021–2024	Succeeded by Abraham George
