= Byron Cook (politician) =

American politician

Member of the Texas House of Representatives from the 8th district
- In office January 14, 2003 – January 8, 2019
- Preceded by: Paul Sadler
- Succeeded by: Cody Harris

Personal details
- Party: Republican
- Education: Navarro College (A.A., 1974)
- Occupation: Rancher; Businessman
- Website: byroncook.com

Byron Cook is an American businessman, rancher, and Republican politician from his native Corsicana in east central Texas, who is a former state representative for District 8, which encompasses the counties of Anderson, Freestone, Hill, and Navarro. In October 2017, Cook announced that he would not seek re-election in 2018.

== Early life and education ==
Cook graduated from Navarro College, a community college, with an associate degree in 1974. Cook's father, the late Leland P. Cook, was the former circulation manager for the Corsicana Daily Sun. Leland left the newspaper to start a family business. In 1986, he and Cook founded Tradewest, a now-defunct video game company and licensee of several Nintendo games, including Double Dragon, Battletoads, and Super Off Road.

== Texas House of Representatives ==
Cook served as the chairman of the Texas House State Affairs Committee and as a member of the Texas House Calendars Committee. He is also a member of the Texas House Republican Caucus and Texas Conservative Coalition. Cook has also served in past legislative sessions as chairman of the Texas House Committees on Civil Practices and the Committee on Environmental Regulation; and as a member of the Texas Sunset Advisory Commission.

During the 2015 Texas legislative session, Cook, who is generally considered to be a moderate Republican, filed a bill to allow illegal immigrants to obtain one-year driving permits, which received pushback from lawmakers within the state.

Cook is one of two named investor victims in securities fraud charges filed against Texas Attorney General Ken Paxton in 2015. Cook and Paxton had earlier been friends who served together in the Texas House of Representatives.

On March 22, 2017, Cook asked an activist from Waxahachie to leave the Texas State Capitol as she was filming a governmental meeting. She was charged with trespassing in spite of the Texas Open Meetings Act.

== 2016 primary election ==
In the March 2016 Republican primary, Cook defeated Thomas McNutt, a Tea Party challenger and an heir of the Collin Street Bakery in Corsicana. Cook won nomination to his eighth term by 225 votes, 14,421 (50.4 percent) to McNutt's 14,196 (49.6 percent). McNutt's campaign claimed that there was voter fraud in Hill County during the primary. After investigation, the Hill County Election Administration Board and the Hill County Election Administrator declared that there was no voter fraud in the primary.

McNutt ran again in the 2018 primary but lost the nomination to Cook's preferred successor, Cody Harris, who then prevailed in the general election, 36,471 votes (78.3 percent) to 10,136 (21.7 percent) for the Democrat Wesley D. Ratcliff.

== Personal life ==
Cook and his wife, Kay, have two daughters. Outside of his political career, Cook is a businessman and rancher.

Texas House of Representatives
Preceded by Paul Sadler	Member of the Texas House of Representatives from the 8th district 2003–2019	Succeeded by Cody Harris
