= Bryan Hughes (politician) =

Texas politician

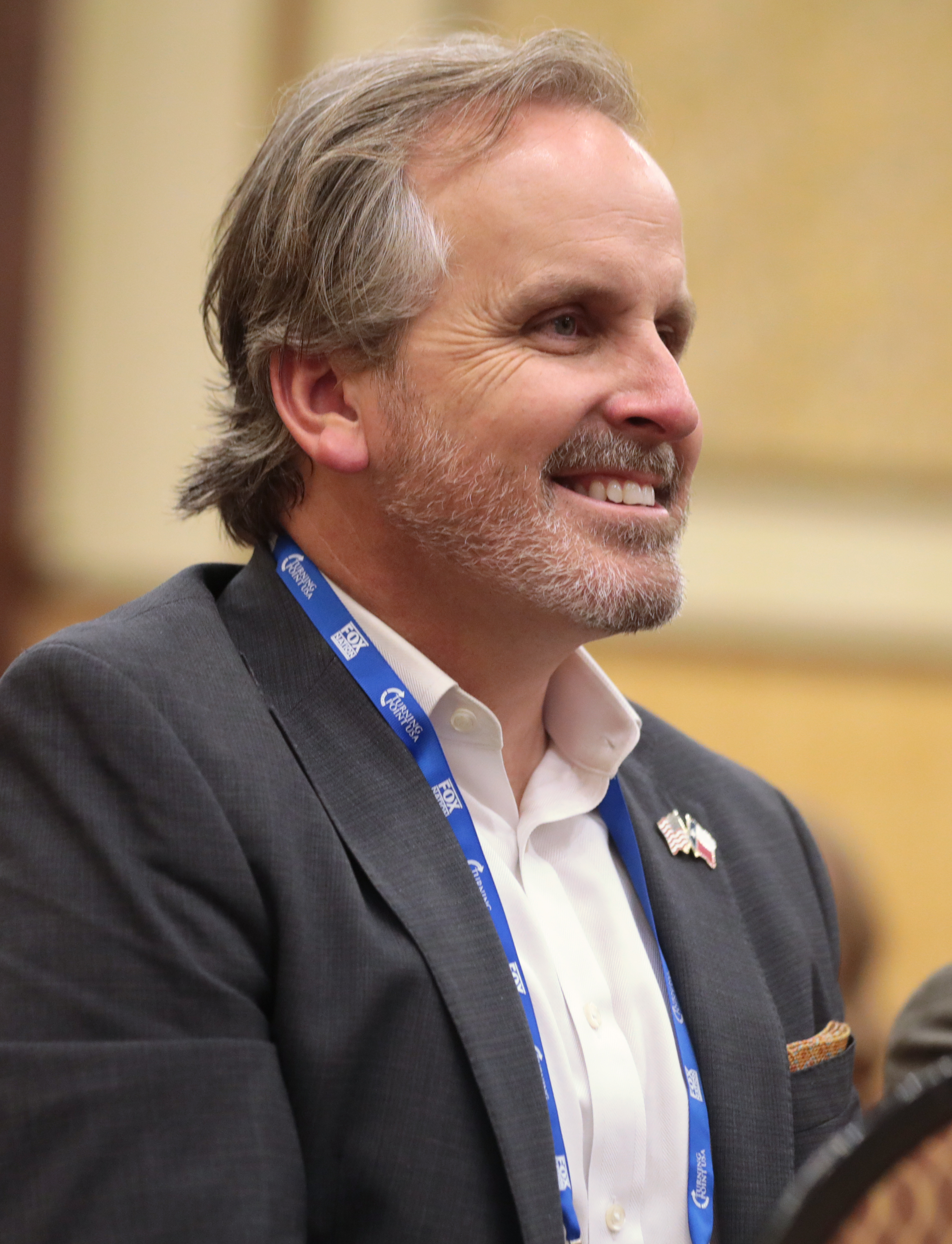
- Hughes in 2022

Member of the Texas Senate from the 1st district
- Incumbent
- Assumed office January 10, 2017
- Preceded by: Kevin Eltife

Member of the Texas House of Representatives from the 5th district
- In office January 14, 2003 – January 10, 2017
- Preceded by: Bob Glaze
- Succeeded by: Cole Hefner

Personal details
- Born: Douglas Bryan Hughes; July 21, 1969 (age 57) Quitman, Texas, U.S.
- Party: Republican
- Education: Tyler Junior College; University of Texas, Tyler (BA); Baylor University (JD)
- Website: Office website Campaign website

Douglas Bryan Hughes (born July 21, 1969) is an American attorney and politician serving as a member of the Texas Senate since 2017. A member of the Republican Party, he previously served in the Texas House of Representatives from 2003 to 2017.

== Background ==
Hughes was born in Quitman and raised in nearby Mineola. After graduating from Mineola High School in 1987, he enrolled at Tyler Junior College. In 1992, he earned his undergraduate degree in economics from the University of Texas at Tyler. In 1995, Hughes received his Juris Doctor degree from Baylor Law School. He clerked for the U.S. District Judge for the Eastern District of Texas, William M. Steger of Texas. In 2003, he joined the Lanier law firm.

== Texas legislature ==
=== Texas House of Representatives ===
Hughes was elected to the Texas House of Representatives in 2002 after running against incumbent Democratic Representative Bob D. Glaze of Gilmer in County. Hughes polled 20,286 votes (52.4 percent) to Glaze's 18,451 (47.6 percent). In the 2004 general election, Glaze ran against Hughes again but lost, garnering 23,029 votes (38 percent) to the Republican's 37,529 (62 percent). In 2006, no Democrat filed against Hughes and he went on to defeat the Libertarian Timothy J. Carmichael, 26,286 (81.9 percent) to 5,795 (18.1 percent). Hughes was unopposed in the 2010 general election, when Republicans carried 101 of the 150 seats in the state House. In 2011, Hughes was on the House Agriculture and Livestock and Human Services committees.

Hughes was renominated in the Republican primary held on May 29, 2012. He polled 13,015 votes (77.7 percent) to 3,744 (22.4 percent) for his opponent, Mary Lookadoo. No Democrat opposed him in the November 6 general election. After his 2012 renomination, Hughes announced that he would attempt to unseat Speaker Straus in 2013. In December, after six months of attempting to line up the necessary commitments, Hughes decided to exit the contest. Representative David Simpson of Longview, who later opposed Hughes in his 2016 state senate race, then entered the contest for Speaker with Hughes' support. However, Simpson also withdrew before the balloting for Speaker began, and Straus was re-elected without opposition on January 8, 2013. Joe Straus also retained the speakership in 2016 with significant support.

=== Texas Senate ===
When Kevin Eltife announced his retirement from the state Senate, Hughes entered the Republican primary to succeed Eltife. Hughes carried the backing of Lieutenant Governor Dan Patrick, the presiding officer of the state senate. In the primary, Hughes won a plurality of the vote (48 percent), but fell short of a majority in a multi-candidate field. In the runoff election on May 24, 2016, Hughes defeated fellow State Representative David Simpson, 27,348 (69.3 percent) to 12,105 (30.7 percent). He faced no Democratic opponent in the November 8 general election.

==== Voting rights ====
In 2021, Hughes introduced legislation to limit voting rights in Texas. This was part of a broader national effort by Republicans to restrict voting rights in the wake of the 2020 elections. Civil rights and voting rights groups have claimed that the proposed legislation is an attempt to restrict the access to voting of voters of color. One provision would prohibit early voting on Sunday mornings, which was a traditional period of voting for black churchgoers as part of 'Souls to the Polls' events.

Hughes defended his attempts to roll back voting by mail, arguing that it was prone to fraud; he offered no evidence for his claims and existing studies show fraud to be exceptionally rare. Hughes has inaccurately claimed that Texas has 400 open voter fraud cases; the Texas Attorney General's office had 43 pending voter fraud cases, of which only one was in relation to the 2020 election.

==== Social media companies ====
Hughes authored a bill that would prohibit social media companies with at least 100 million monthly users from blocking, banning, demonetizing or discriminating against a user based on their politics. The bill would also require the companies to disclose their content moderation policies. The bill was signed into law in September 2021.

==== Abortion ====
On March 11, 2021, Hughes introduced a fetal heartbeat bill entitled the Texas Heartbeat Bill (SB8) into the Texas Senate and state representative Shelby Slawson of Stephenville, Texas introduced a companion bill (HB1515) into the state house. The bill allowed private citizens to sue abortion providers after a fetal heartbeat has been detected. The SB8 version of the bill passed both chambers and was signed into law by Texas Governor Greg Abbott on May 19, 2021. It took effect on September 1, 2021.

==== Education ====
In 2021, Hughes authored SB3, legislation intended to prohibit teaching critical race theory (CRT) in Texas public schools. The bill has been criticized for creating confusion about what teachers can and cannot teach in the classroom regarding racism, particularly with respect to current events; supporters of the law argue that its focus is to prevent distortion of the historical record regarding the actions of white people and the Founding Fathers of the United States, but without whitewashing historical events that harmed disadvantaged racial or ethnic groups. SB3 did not remove any component from the state's core curriculum covering topics such as slavery in the United States, the American Civil War, the Ku Klux Klan, the civil rights movement, eugenics, and the Holocaust.

==== Impeachment of Ken Paxton ====
In May 2023, Hughes became a central figure in the impeachment of Ken Paxton, the sitting Texas Attorney General. In the second of twenty articles of impeachment filed on May 25, the Republican-led House General Investigating Committee found that Paxton improperly arranged for Hughes to request a legal opinion to help Paxton's friend and political donor, land developer Nate Paul, avert foreclosure sales of business properties. Paxton then concealed his arrangement with Hughes, the committee said, characterizing Hughes as a "straw requestor". Hughes's actions were a potential complication in the impeachment trial to be conducted by the Senate because it seemed likely that Hughes would testify as a witness at the trial, but under normal Texas rules of court procedure, a material witness may not serve as a juror. Hughes did not state whether he would recuse himself from voting on the articles of impeachment.

On September 6, 2023, during Paxton's trial, Ryan Bangert, one of the whistleblowers who called attention to Paxton's relationship with Paul, testified that there was no evidence that Hughes knew beforehand that the legal opinion he requested was intended to benefit any specific person.

On September 16, 2023, Hughes voted to acquit Paxton of all sixteen of the articles of impeachment he faced in the Senate trial. Paxton was acquitted of all sixteen articles and he was reinstated in office.

==== Environmental, Social, and Governance (ESG) financing ====
Hughes, sent letters to investment giants BlackRock, State Street Global Advisors, and The Vanguard Group, along with Institutional Shareholder Services Inc on Aug. 10, 2022, requesting documentation related to the companies' decision-making involving their respective environmental, social, and governance practices.

==== Second Amendment ====
In 2021, Hughes sponsored a bill to provide immunity from legal liability for trained, armed teachers and security personnel working for a school district when they use a firearm to defend a school.

==== Drag shows ====
In 2023, a bill written by Hughes prohibiting minors from attending drag shows was passed by the Texas legislature. The law was found to violate the First Amendment to the United States Constitution by David Hittner in 2023 and again in 2026 following appeal by Kurt D. Engelhardt.
