= Cody Harris (politician) =

American politician (born 1983)

Member of the Texas House of Representatives from the 8th district
- Incumbent
- Assumed office January 8, 2019
- Preceded by: Byron Cook

Personal details
- Born: Cody Joe Harris; August 16, 1983 (age 43) Tyler, Texas, U.S.
- Party: Republican
- Spouse: Taylor
- Children: 4
- Education: Texas A&M University
- Occupation: Businessman
- Website: codyfortexas.com

Cody Joe Harris (born August 16, 1983) is a Republican member of the Texas House of Representatives for District 8.

== Political career ==
Harris won the Republican primary against Thomas McNutt by a margin of 57% to 43%.

Harris won the general election on November 6, 2018, against Democrat Wesley Ratcliff 78.2% to 21.8%.

Harris conducted a town hall with his constituents in Palestine, Texas on February 28, 2025 with Representative Brad Buckley accompanying him, regarding the topic of school vouchers. The town hall was scheduled for a two-hour session beginning at 5pm in the Palestine High School auditorium. However, Harris terminated the town hall early and departed the forum amidst vocal dissent from the attendees regarding his stance which supported school vouchers. He later criticized the attendees of the town hall that consisted of parents, educators, and concerned citizens by stating, "Unfortunately, some in the crowd chose to disrupt the conversation, turning it into a Palestinian-style protest that drowned out voices meant to inform, engage, and debate in good faith. Those who came to listen, learn, and respectfully express their positions were met with yelling, name-calling, and chaos."

Texas House of Representatives
Preceded by Byron Cook	Member of the Texas House of Representatives from the 8th district 2019–present	Incumbent
