= Texas Open Meetings Act =

The Texas Open Meetings Act (TOMA),Chapter 551, Government Code whereby meetings held by governmental bodies in the state of Texas, be they at the state or local level, must be open to the public (except for executive sessions). Moreover, the act says, "a person in attendance may record all or any part of an open meeting of a governmental body by means of a recorder, video camera, or other means of aural or visual reproduction.”

On March 22, 2017, an activist from Waxahachie was arrested at the Texas State Capitol for attempting to film a governmental meeting. She was asked to leave by Representative Byron Cook and charged with trespassing.
