= Collin Street Bakery =

Bakery in Texas, famous for their fruitcake

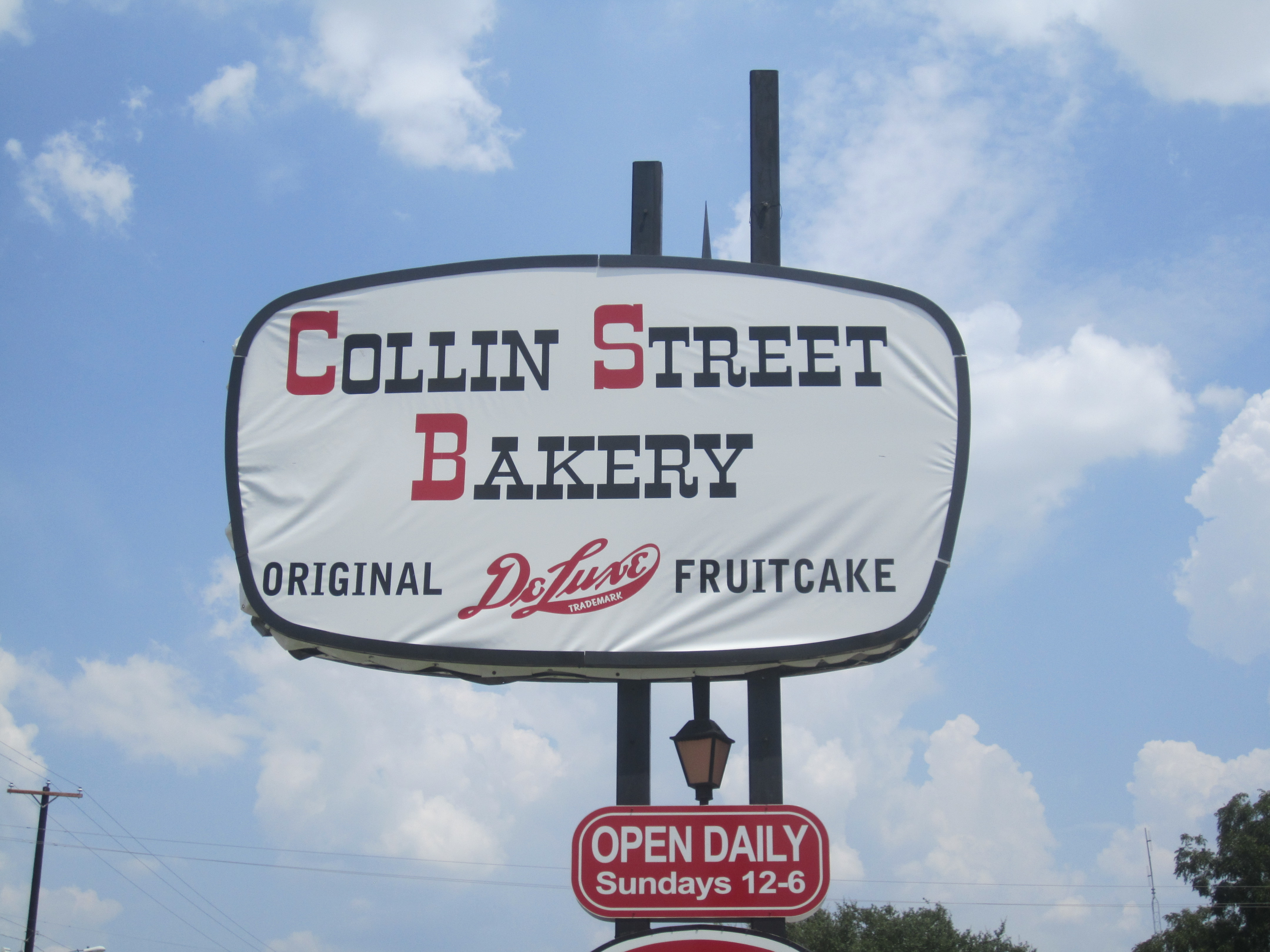
- Collin Street Bakery sign in Corsicana, Texas
- Founded: 1896
- Founder: Gus Weidmann; Tom McElwee
- Headquarters: Corsicana, Texas, United States
- Number of locations: Waco, Texas; Lindale, Texas
- Products: Fruitcake; Other holiday cakes
- Number of employees: 600+ (during Christmas shipping season)
- Website: collinstreet.com

The Collin Street Bakery is located in Corsicana, Texas, USA. The bakery is best known for its production of fruitcake.

The bakery was the recipient of the President's "E" Award.

== Early history ==
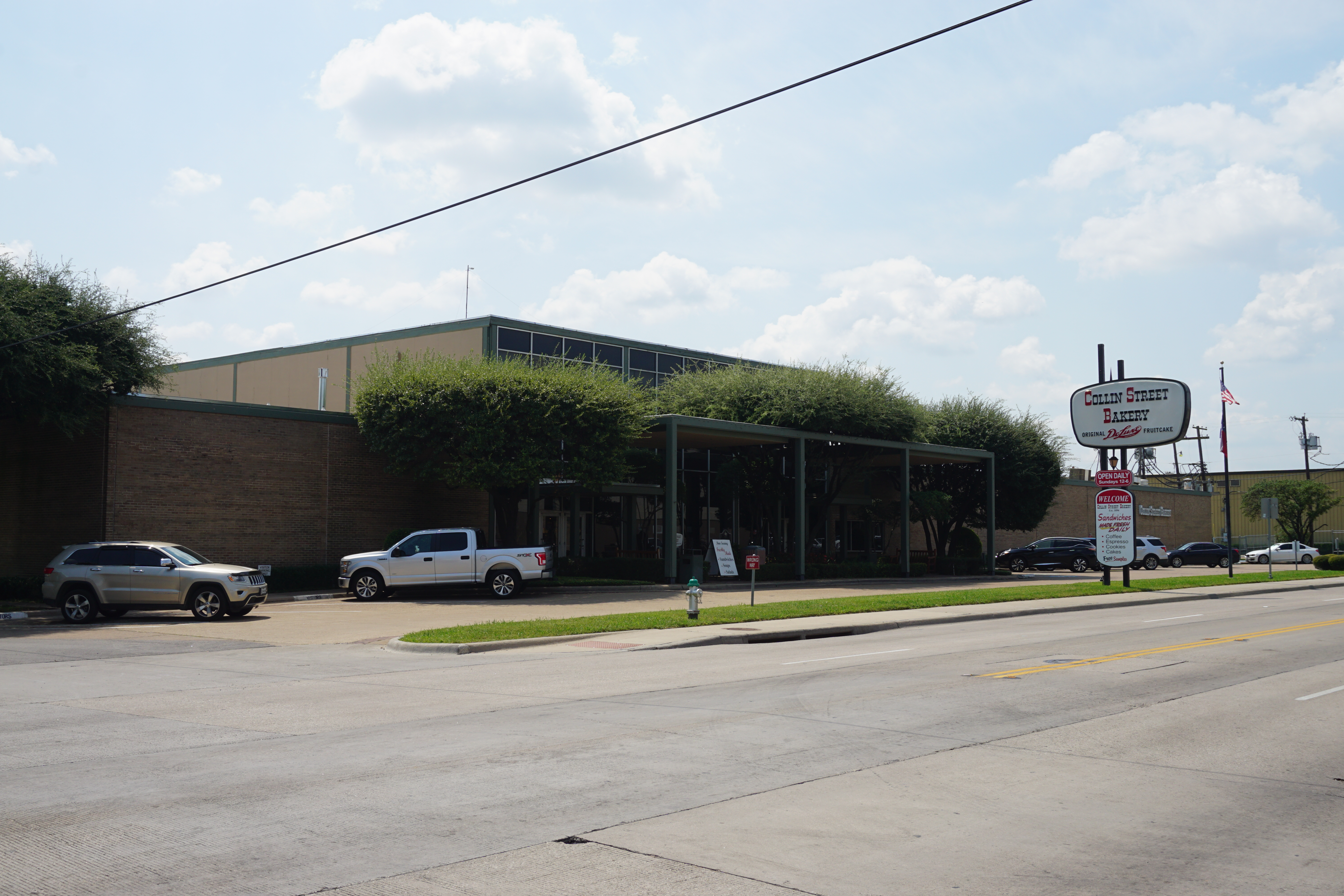
The Collin Street Bakery in Corsicana, Texas

The bakery was founded in 1896 by August Wiederman, an immigrant from Wiesbaden, Germany. With the help of local entrepreneur Tom McElwee, the bakery soon outgrew its original building, and required a new one in which the second floor was turned into a hotel. Celebrities such as Enrico Caruso and Will Rogers were sighted at the bakery, and in 1914 the Ringling Brothers Circus passed through town and ordered dozens of fruitcakes as Christmas gifts to be mailed to friends and family across the globe. In this way, the bakery entered the mail-order business. Lee William "L. W." McNutt, Sr. (1895-1972), Harry Cook, and Bob Rutherford purchased the bakery in 1946 from August Wiederman.

== Mail order sales ==
In reference to the mail order business started in 1947, bakery employees copied names and addresses from a myriad of phone books for "prospecting" list. Lee William McNutt, Jr. (1925-2006), initiated a direct marketing campaign to international customers. Under his direction, the bakery began accepting orders by mail, phone, fax, and online. He also pioneered the use of a computerized database and fine-tuned shipping methods to make delivery of the cakes more efficient. The third generation CEO, Robert Pritchett "Bob" McNutt (born 1957) has continued to refine all of these methods adopted by his father, L. W. McNutt.

Thomas Max McNutt (born 1990), a graduate of Texas A&M University in College Station, is the bakery vice president. A fourth-generation family member, he ran unsuccessfully for the Texas House of Representatives in the Republican primary election held on March 1, 2016. He lost by 222 votes to the long-term incumbent Byron Cook, also of Corsicana.

=== Notable clients ===
The descendants of the Ringling circus continue to order cakes. Monaco's Princess Caroline also places an annual order, continuing her mother, Princess Grace's tradition of a Christmas DeLuxe fruitcake for their family and friends. Hilton Hotels are a longtime customer, as is Master Builders, S.A. of Brussels, Belgium. Also counted in the above group is Madison Square Garden and Vanna White. The company rejected an order from Iran's Ayatollah Khomeini following the 1979 Iranian hostage crisis. The DeLuxe Fruitcake is shipped to all countries except Cuba and Iran.

== Fraud and film ==
In 1998, Collin Street Bakery hired a bookkeeper, Sandy Jenkins. Jenkins was promoted to the controller in 2004 when he earned approximately $50,000 per year. Before being caught in 2013, Jenkins embezzled over $16 million. Jenkins died in prison in 2019. A movie about the scandal has been in pre-production since 2019. The film is slated to be titled Fruitcake and originally starred Will Ferrell and Laura Dern, but was recast with Paul Walter Hauser and Jennifer Garner in 2024.

== Statistics ==
Fruitcake accounts for 98 percent of the bakery's total sales. The company sells about 3 million pounds of fruitcake each year, which equates to 1.5 million individual cakes.

The majority of orders are placed by mail during October and November.

Despite the heavy demand, the bakery does not have a distributor but sells its branded goods only by mail-order system, as well as at its two Corsicana stores and locations in Waco and Lindale. In the past some specialty supermarkets, such as the defunct Amarraca in Pittsburgh's North Hills, have sold a private label version of the fruitcake.
