= Bennett Ratliff =

American politician

Member of the Texas House of Representatives from the 115th district
- In office January 8, 2013 – January 13, 2015
- Preceded by: Jim Jackson
- Succeeded by: Matt Rinaldi

Personal details
- Born: August 18, 1961 (age 65) Fort Worth, Texas, U.S.
- Party: Republican
- Spouse: Rebecca
- Relations: Bill Ratliff (father); Plasma (niece)
- Children: 3
- Education: University of Texas at Austin (BS)

Bennett Ratliff (born August 18, 1961) is an American civil engineer, businessman, and politician who served as a Republican member of the Texas House of Representatives from district 115 in Dallas County and currently serves as Chairman of the Planning and Zoning Commission in Plano, Texas.

== Career ==
He founded The Ratliff Group, LLC, an engineering and construction management firm, in Coppell in 2002 and has grown it to be one of the most successful and respected firms in its market segment. In 2013, Ratliff was given the Distinguished Engineering Award from the Texas Engineering Foundation of the Society of Professional Engineers in recognition of his distinguished service to the engineering profession and in 2015 was inducted into the Academy of Distinguished Alumni for the University of Texas Cockrell School of Engineering. In 2016, Ratliff was again recognized by his peers in the Texas Society of Civil Engineers as the Citizen Engineer of the Year, for his service to the State of Texas and his community.

Prior to his legislative term, Ratliff was a nine-year elected member and vice president of the board of trustees of the Coppell Independent School District, had twice served as a delegate to the State Republican Party Convention and had been involved in a number of local and state Republican campaigns.

In October 2021, the Plano City Council appointed Ratliff to serve on the Planning & Zoning Commission and named him Chairman in October 2024.

== Texas House of Representatives ==
Representative Ratliff served on the House committees of (1) Appropriations and (2) Public Education. He authored eighteen bills and by the end of the session, thirteen of his priority issues had become law, the best record of any freshman in the 83rd Legislative Session.

In his bid for a second term, Ratliff lost the Republican nomination to a 2012 tea party opponent, Matt Rinaldi, who received 4,167 votes (50.6 percent) to Ratliff's 4,075 votes (49.44 percent) in the March 4, 2014 Republican primary. Rinaldi, an Irving lawyer and one of Ratliff's opponents two years before, had extensive support from a special interest PAC, Empower Texans. On March 1, 2016, Ratliff tried unsuccessfully to regain his seat, but lost again to Rinaldi in the Republican primary 8,804 to 7,668 (53.45% to 46.55%)

In the 2018 General Election, Ratliff broke with the Republican Party to endorse Democratic candidate Julie Johnson for Ratliff's former Texas House seat, due to the need for the legislature to address Ratliff's top priority, Texas' Public Education Finance system. Ratliff proved to be correct in his support, as Johnson went on to win the seat with a double-digit margin over Matt Rinaldi, and became the first Democratic representative to co-author House Bill 3 to reform and overhaul the Texas School finance system, a bill that passed with overwhelming bipartisan support and was signed into law by Republican Governor Greg Abbott.

== Personal life ==
Ratliff and his wife, Rebecca, a former public schoolteacher, have three grown children and two grandchildren.

Texas House of Representatives
Preceded by Jim Jackson	Texas State Representative from District 115 (Dallas County); 2013–	Succeeded by Matt Rinaldi
