= Plasma (drag queen) =

American drag performer

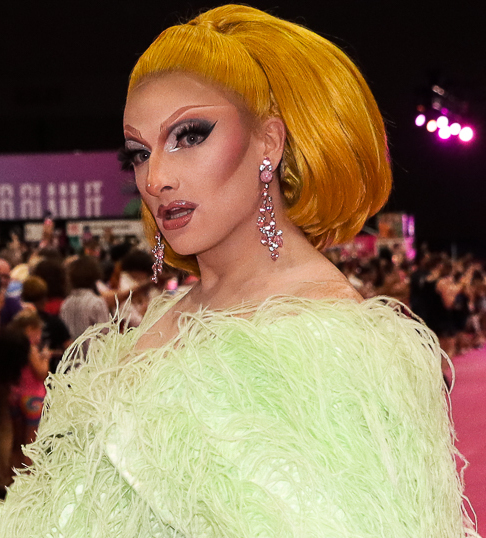
- Plasma at RuPaul's DragCon LA 2024
- Born: Taylor Ratliff; November 6, 1998 (age 28); Austin, Texas, U.S.
- Other name: Plasma LaRose
- Education: University of Oklahoma (BFA)
- Occupations: Drag queen; actor; singer
- Television: RuPaul's Drag Race (season 16)
- Relatives: Bill Ratliff (grandfather); Bennett Ratliff (uncle)

Plasma is the stage name of Taylor Ratliff (born November 6, 1998), an American drag performer, actor, and singer. Plasma is best known for competing on season 16 of RuPaul's Drag Race.

== Early life and education ==
Ratliff was born in Austin, Texas to Thomas and Stacy Ratliff. His grandfather is Bill Ratliff, the 40th lieutenant governor of Texas. Taylor Ratliff grew up in Mount Pleasant, a small rural town in Northeast Texas. He has a sister named Sarah. After listening to singers like Julie Andrews, Judy Garland, and Barbra Streisand, and participating in junior high theatrical plays, he developed a love of theatre. In 2021, Ratliff graduated from the University of Oklahoma with a Bachelor of Fine Arts degree in musical theatre performance.

== Career ==
After graduating, Ratliff moved to Hamilton Heights, Manhattan in June of 2021 to start a career in theatre before deciding to engage with the city's resurgent drag scene.

Plasma started her New York City drag career at the Lady Liberty pageant hosted by RuPaul's Drag Race alum Brita Filter. Her drag is heavily inspired by the actresses of the Golden Age of Hollywood and seeks to unite vintage and modern American pop culture.

Plasma competed on season 16 of RuPaul's Drag Race. She won two "maxi challenges" before being eliminated from the competition in the season's ninth episode after a lip-sync contest loss to fellow contestant Mhi'ya Iman Le'Paige to a remix of "Bloody Mary" by Lady Gaga. She holds the series record for lowest placement by anyone with at least two solo "maxi challenge" wins.

Her debut album Is Miss Thing On? released on November 7th 2025.

== Personal life ==
Ratliff is based in New York City. His father is a Republican lobbyist in Texas, who has fought against anti-drag legislation. His grandfather is Bill Ratliff, former lieutenant governor of Texas.

Plasma's "drag mother" is Vanda LaRose from the seventh season of Dragula.

== Discography ==
=== Albums ===
- Is Miss Thing On? (2025)

=== Singles ===
- "Don't Rain on My Parade" (2024)

== Filmography ==
- RuPaul's Drag Race (season 16)
- RuPaul's Drag Race: Untucked
- Bring Back My Girls

=== Music videos ===
- "Don't Rain on My Parade" (2024)
- "Bloody Mary" (2024)
- "Anything Goes" (2024)
- "Thanks a Lot But No Thanks" (2025)

== See also ==
- LGBTQ culture in New York City
- List of LGBTQ people from New York City
- List of people from New York City
- List of University of Oklahoma people
