= Abraham George (politician) =

American businessperson and politician

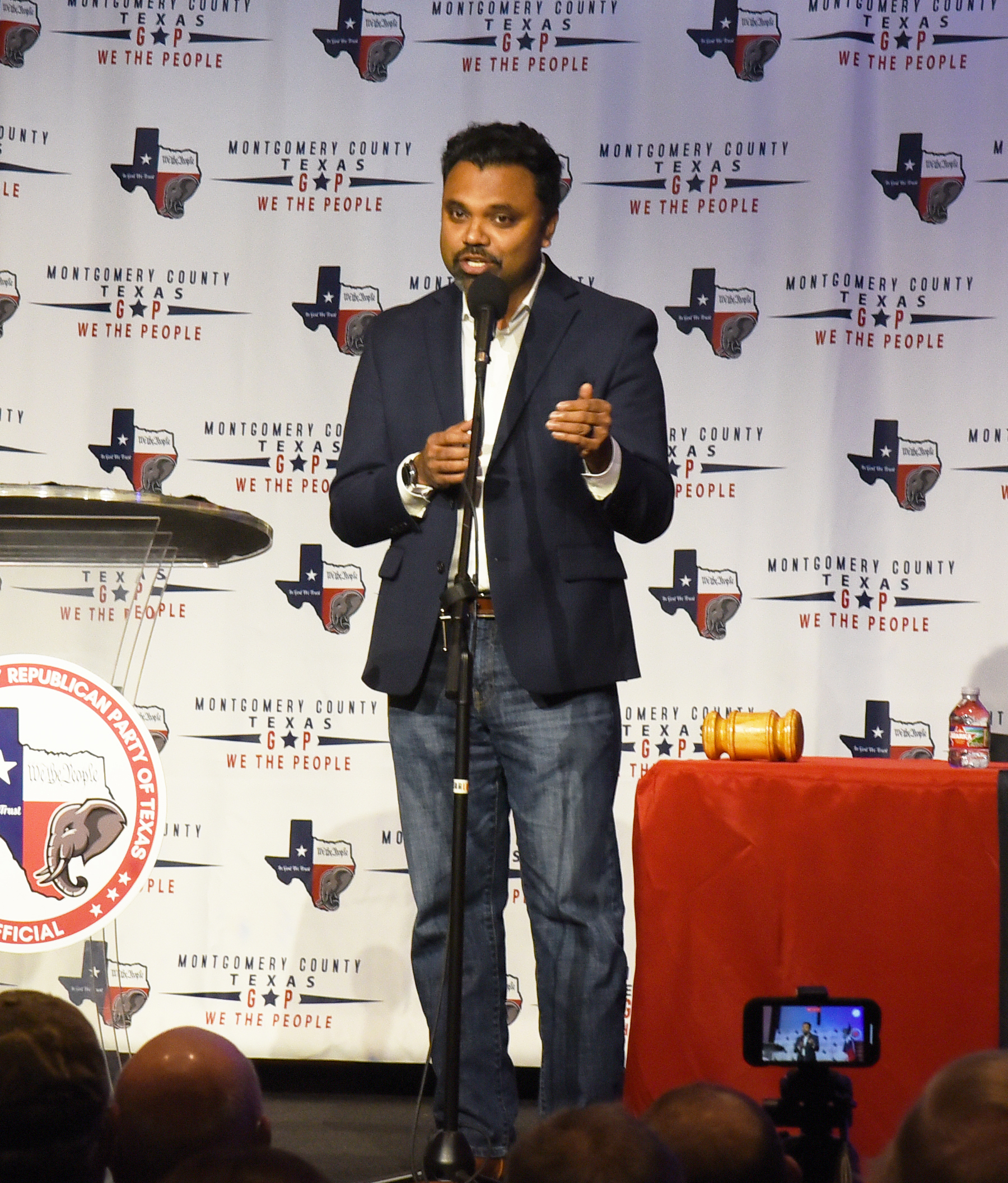

Chair of the Texas Republican Party
- In office May 24, 2024 – June 12, 2026
- Preceded by: Matt Rinaldi
- Succeeded by: D'rinda Randall

Personal details
- Born: October 19, 1979 (age 47) Kerala, India
- Party: Republican
- Spouse: Jeena
- Children: 2
- Education: University of North Texas (MBA)
- Website: Campaign website

Abraham George (born October 19, 1979) is an Indian-born American businessman and politician from Parker, Texas, who served as the chairman of the Republican Party of Texas from May 2024 to June 2026. In June 2026, George was defeated in his re-election bid.

== Early life and education ==
Born in Kerala, India, George moved to the United States at the age of 16 with his family in 1996. He became a U.S. citizen in 2001. George earned his MBA from the University of North Texas.

George started a software firm in 2012 that specialized in healthcare management.

== Political career ==
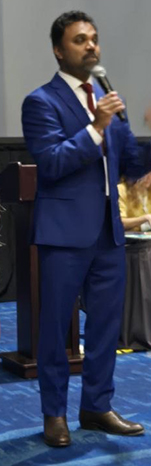
Abraham George speaking to the SD-4 Caucus at the Republican Party of Texas Convention at the George R. Brown Convention Center in Houston, Texas on June 11, 2026.

George was elected to the state Republican executive committee to represent Senate District 8 in 2020, then elected chair of the Collin County GOP by the executive committee in October 2021, and won re-election in March 2022. As chairman, he criticized the impeachment of Texas Attorney General Ken Paxton as a waste of time and resources that took Republican House members away from priorities such as the border and economy. He also criticized the prosecution of Paxton's impeachment, stating that the evidence that the prosecutors presented did not support a guilty verdict in the impeachment.

In October 2023, he resigned to run in the Republican primary for Texas's 89th House district, challenging incumbent representative Candy Noble, where he was defeated.

He was elected chairman at the Texas Republican convention in San Antonio on May 24, 2024. George faced six other candidates. On the convention floor, George defeated outgoing party vice-chair Dana Myers and former Texas Real Estate Commissioner Weston Martinez. In the final round of voting, George defeated Myers, 54% to 46%. George was endorsed by the outgoing chairman Matt Rinaldi and Ken Paxton.

In April 2026, George named Amanda Hopper, wife of Texas State Representative Andy Hopper, as his running mate to serve as vice chair of the party. The election took place at the 2026 Texas Republican Party State Convention on June 12th. He campaigned on promoting four main issues if elected. The first was banning sharia law in Texas. The second was cutting property taxes in Texas. The third one was reforming the use of H1B visas. And the fourth one was closing the Republican Party primaries in Texas to only members of the party.

On June 12, 2026, George was defeated in his re-election bid when 25 out of 31 Senate District delegations voted to support his opponent, D’rinda Randall. There was no floor vote because George conceded after the Senate district votes.

== Political positions ==
George opposes Democrats being appointed to committee chair positions in the Texas House by a Republican Speaker, believing that the practice takes away the power of the House from the Republicans and gives it to the Democrats.

George supports school choice.

== Personal life ==
George and his wife, Jeena, a registered nurse, live in Parker, Texas, with their two children, both of whom attend the Plano Independent School District. He is of Malayali descent.

== Election results ==
2024 Texas 89th District Republican primary
Party	Candidate	Votes	%
Republican	Candy Noble (incumbent)	9,579	52.60%
Republican	Abraham George	8,632	47.40%
Total votes		18,211	100.00%

Party political offices
Preceded by Matt Rinaldi	Chair of the Texas Republican Party; 2024–2026	Succeeded by D'rinda Randall
