= Bill Ratliff =

American politician (1936–2025)

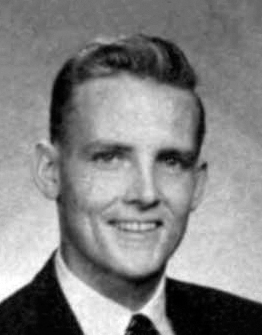
- Ratliff in 1958

40th Lieutenant Governor of Texas
- In office December 28, 2000 – January 21, 2003
- Governor: Rick Perry
- Preceded by: Rick Perry
- Succeeded by: David Dewhurst

Member of the Texas Senate from the 1st district
- In office January 10, 1989 – January 10, 2004
- Preceded by: Richard Anderson
- Succeeded by: Kevin Eltife

Personal details
- Born: William Roark Ratliff; August 16, 1936
- Died: December 8, 2025 (aged 89) Mount Pleasant, Texas, U.S.
- Party: Republican
- Spouse: Sally Sandlin
- Children: 3, including Bennett
- Relatives: Plasma
- Education: University of Texas at Austin (BS)

William Roark Ratliff (August 16, 1936 – December 8, 2025) was an American politician and engineer who served as a member of the Texas Senate from 1989 to 2004. Between 2000 and 2003, he served as the 40th lieutenant governor of Texas, after the previous Lieutenant Governor Rick Perry replaced George W. Bush, who resigned to become president of the United States.

== Early life and education ==
William Roark Ratliff was born on August 16, 1936. He was educated at Sonora High School in Sonora in Sutton County in West Texas and then at the University of Texas at Austin, where he studied civil engineering. Ratliff was a member of the Phi Gamma Delta fraternity.

== Career ==
Ratliff worked as a civil engineer for thirty years.

=== Texas Senate ===
Ratliff was first elected in 1988 as a Republican to the Texas Senate. In 1992, he was appointed chairman of the Senate Education Committee by Lieutenant Governor Bob Bullock. From 1997 to 1998, he served as President Pro Tempore of the Texas Senate.

Ratliff announced in 2003 that he would not run for reelection to the State Senate in 2004. Instead, he soon resigned the Senate seat and was succeeded in a special election by Republican Kevin Eltife of Tyler. In 2005, Ratliff was awarded the John F. Kennedy Profile in Courage Award for "the example he has set of courage and principle in American public life".

=== Lieutenant governor ===
In 2000, for the first time in Texas history, the Texas Senate was called upon to choose a new lieutenant governor after the election of George W. Bush as President of the United States and the resultant succession of lieutenant governor Rick Perry to become governor. In accordance with a 1984 amendment to the Texas Constitution of 1876, the Texas Senate chooses one of its own members to fill a vacancy in the position of lieutenant governor.

In the election for lieutenant governor, Ratliff defeated rival David Sibley of Waco. In 2001, Ratliff first announced that he would be a candidate for election to a full four-year term to the office of lieutenant governor in the 2002 state elections, and he received the endorsement of several prominent Republican legislators. However, he later withdrew from the race, and the position went to David Dewhurst, the Texas land commissioner.

== Political views ==
Ratliff was regarded as a moderate. He stated in an interview, "I am a Republican because I agree with the Republicans at least 51 percent of the time." He has taken bipartisan stands on a number of issues. While in the Texas Senate, he supported controversial reforms that transferred funds from richer to poorer school districts for more equitable funding. He also argued in favor of "patients' rights" in medical malpractice cases during a debate on tort reform, and in 2003 criticized other members of the State Senate for failing to raise taxes in order to prevent large budget cuts.

In early 2003, Ratliff was the only dissenting member of his party who joined with Democratic state senators in opposing a redistricting proposal of Texas's then thirty-two seats in the United States House of Representatives that he felt would lead to the under-representation of rural voters. In cooperation with ten Democrats, he signed a letter refusing to bring the matter to the Senate floor, which, by virtue of Texas Senate traditions that require a two-thirds vote of those present and voting to allow a bill to be debated, prevented the proposal from being passed.

Eventually a plan suitable to Republicans was enacted in the third of three special legislative sessions called in 2003 by Governor Perry. Under that plan, by 2011, Republicans held twenty-three U.S. House seats from Texas compared to nine for Democrats.

== Personal life and death ==
He and his wife, the former Sally Sandlin, had three children and eight grandchildren. Daughter, Bess Ratliff Yeary (born 1960) of Spring Branch, Son Bennett Ratliff (born 1961) of Plano, a civil engineer, served as a Coppell ISD School Board Trustee and represented District 115 in the Texas House of Representatives. And son, Robert Thomas Ratliff (born 1967) of Mt. Pleasant, a former member of the Texas State Board of Education.

Following his political career, Ratliff became an education lobbyist. He was married to Sally Sandlin Ratliff for 60 years. He died at his home in Mount Pleasant, Texas, on December 8, 2025, at the age of 89.

Political offices
Preceded by Rick Perry	Lieutenant Governor of Texas; 2000–2003	Succeeded by David Dewhurst
