= Bartlit Beck Herman Palenchar & Scott =

Bartlit Beck LLP is a Chicago and Denver-based law firm founded in 1993 by Fred Bartlit, Jr. (born 1932), Phil Beck (born 1951), Skip Herman (born 1953), James Palenchar, Don Scott (deceased), and Mark Ferguson. The firm is a spin-off of Chicago-based law firm Kirkland and Ellis. The American Lawyer magazine named the firm its litigation boutique of the year for 2009. In 2018, the firm named Jason Peltz as managing partner to replace founding partner Skip Herman. In 2020, Benchmark Litigation named Bartlit Beck its trial firm of the year. The firm is an Illinois limited liability partnership.

== Corporate practice ==
Bartlit Beck's corporate practice focuses on middle-market mergers and acquisitions (negotiated and hostile), securities offerings and compliance issues, corporate finance, fund formation, tax matters, and counselling on sensitive corporate governance matters.
