= Texas's 8th House of Representatives district =

American legislative district

Texas's 8th State House of Representatives district
Representative
Cody Harris; R–Palestine
- Demographics: 59.9% White; 14.8% Black; 22.0% Hispanic; 0.9% Asian; 2.4% Other
- Population (2020) • Voting age: 192,599; 149,542

District 8 is a district in the Texas House of Representatives. It was created in the 3rd legislature (1849–1851).

The district has been represented by Republican Cody Harris since January 8, 2019, upon his initial election to the Texas House.

As a result of redistricting after the 2020 Federal census, from the 2022 elections the district encompasses all of Anderson, Cherokee, and Navarro Counties, and the geographic majority (but population minority) of Henderson County. Major cities in the district include Corsicana, Jacksonville, Palestine, and Rusk. The majority of Lake Palestine is in the district, as is the notable unincorporated community of Tennessee Colony, which is the location of five Texas Department of Criminal Justice prisons.
