= RuPaulmark Channel =

- RuPaul's Drag Race episode
- Episode no.: Season 13; Episode 4
- Original air date: January 22, 2021

Guest appearances
- Loni Love (guest judge); Jeffrey Bowyer-Chapman

Episode chronology
← Previous "Phenomenon"	Next → "The Bag Ball"

"RuPaulmark Channel" is the fourth episode of the thirteenth season of the American television series RuPaul's Drag Race. It originally aired on January 22, 2021. The episode's main challenge tasks contestants with acting in holiday movies. Loni Love is a guest judge and Jeffrey Bowyer-Chapman also makes a guest appearance. Symone is the winner of the main challenge. Kahmora Hall is eliminated from the competition after placing in the bottom and losing a lip-sync contest against Denali to "100% Pure Love" by Crystal Waters.

== Episode ==
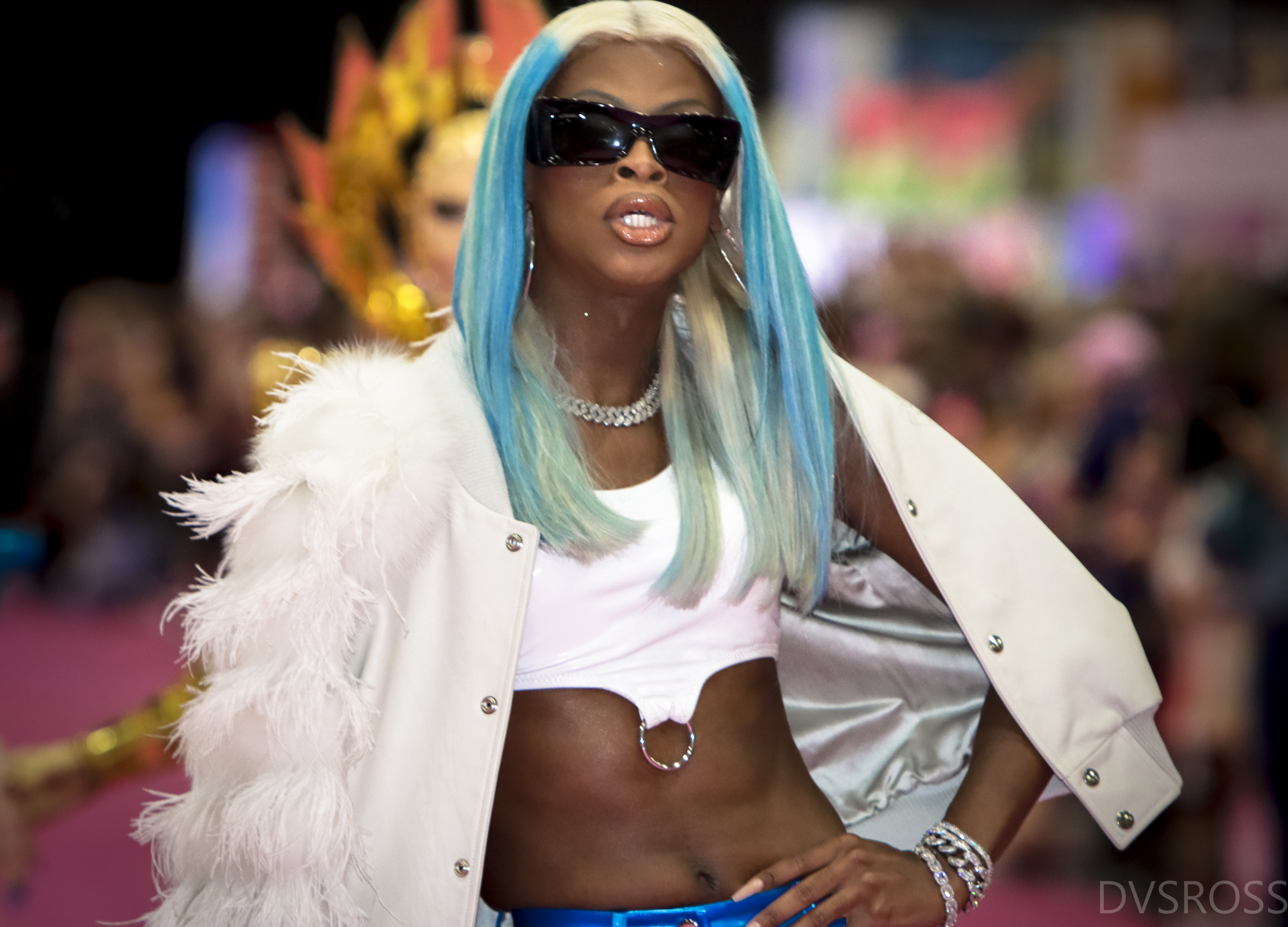
Symone (pictured at RuPaul's DragCon LA in 2022) win's the episode's main challenge.

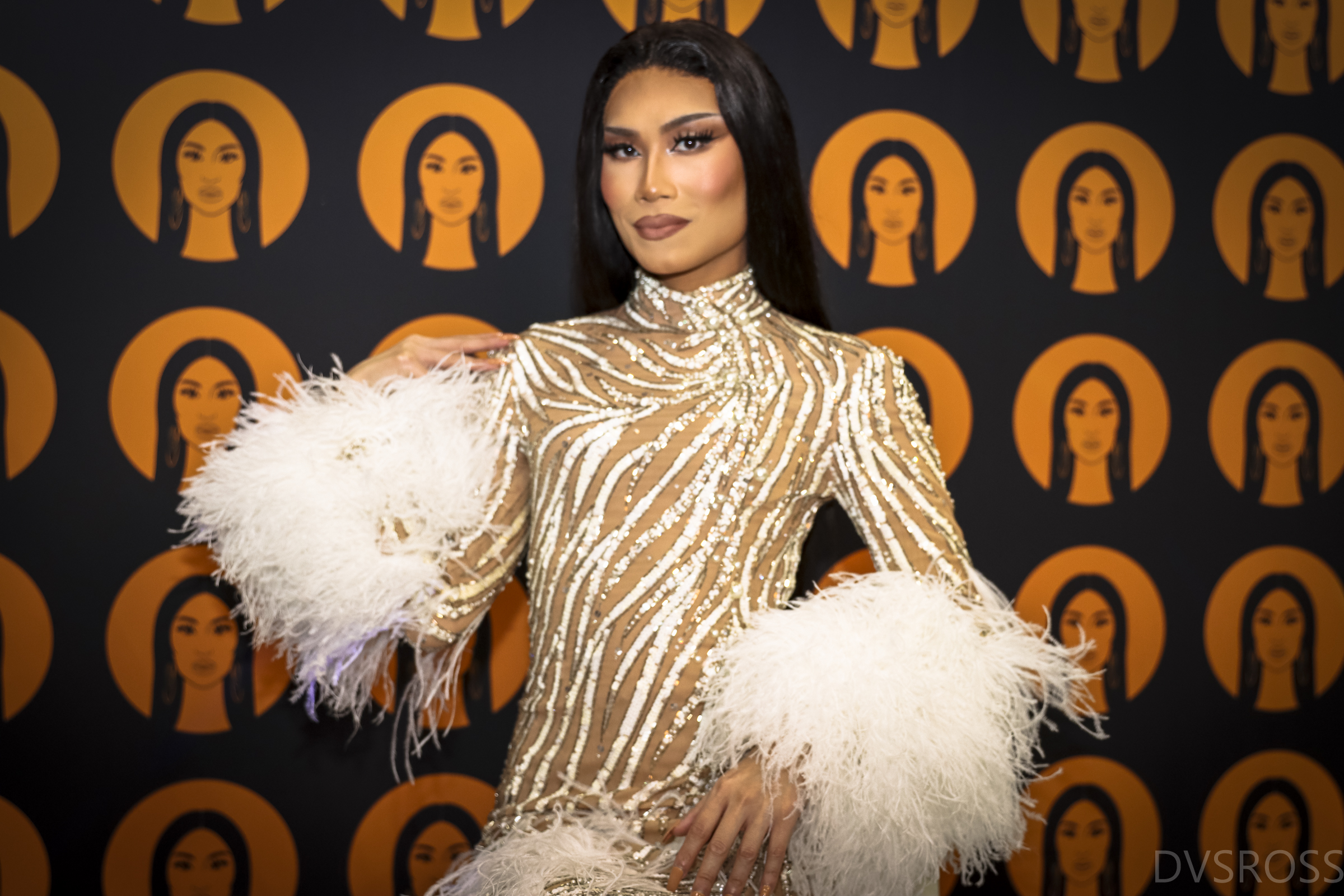
Kahmora Hall (pictured at RuPaul's DragCon LA in 2022) is eliminated from the competition.

In the Werk Room, the contestants in the "winners" group are joined by the other group. Elliott with 2 Ts initially hides behind a screen to avoid detection. The contestants talk about Elliott with 2 Ts, before she reveals herself. On a new day, RuPaul greets the merged group and reveals the main challenge, which tasks contestants with overacting in "RuPaulmark Channel" holiday movies. Following are the film titles and group members:

- Misery Love's Company – Denali, Elliott with 2 Ts, Kahmora Hall, and Olivia Lux
- God Loves Flags – LaLa Ri, Rosé, Symone, and Utica Queen
- April Fool's Rush In – Gottmik, Joey Jay, Kandy Muse, Tamisha Iman, and Tina Burner

The three films are Valentine's Day-, Flag Day-, and April Fools' Day-themed, respectively. The contestants break into groups, review the scripts, select their roles, and begin to rehearse. RuPaul returns to the Werk Room to meet with each group, asking questions and offering advice. RuPaul asks Utica Queen if she has smoked cannabis, prompting an ambiguous reply from the contestant and a hysterical laugh from RuPaul. RuPaul reveals the category for the fashion show ("Trains for Days"), then the contestants rehearse and film with Ross Mathews. Back in the Werk Room, the contestants make final preparations for the fashion show. Symone discusses going to prom in drag. Tamisha Iman reveals she has three biological children.

On the main stage, RuPaul welcomes fellow judges Michelle Visage and Mathews, as well as guest judge Loni Love. The fashion show commences. The judges deliver their critiques, deliberate, and share the results with the group. Kandy Muse, Rosé, and Symone receive positive critiques, and Symone is declared the winner. Denali, Kahmora Hall, and LaLa Ri receive negative critiques. Denali and Kahmora Hall place in the bottom and face off in a lip-sync contest to "100% Pure Love (1994) by Crystal Waters. Denali wins the lip-sync and Kahmora Hall is eliminated from the competition.

== Production and broadcast ==
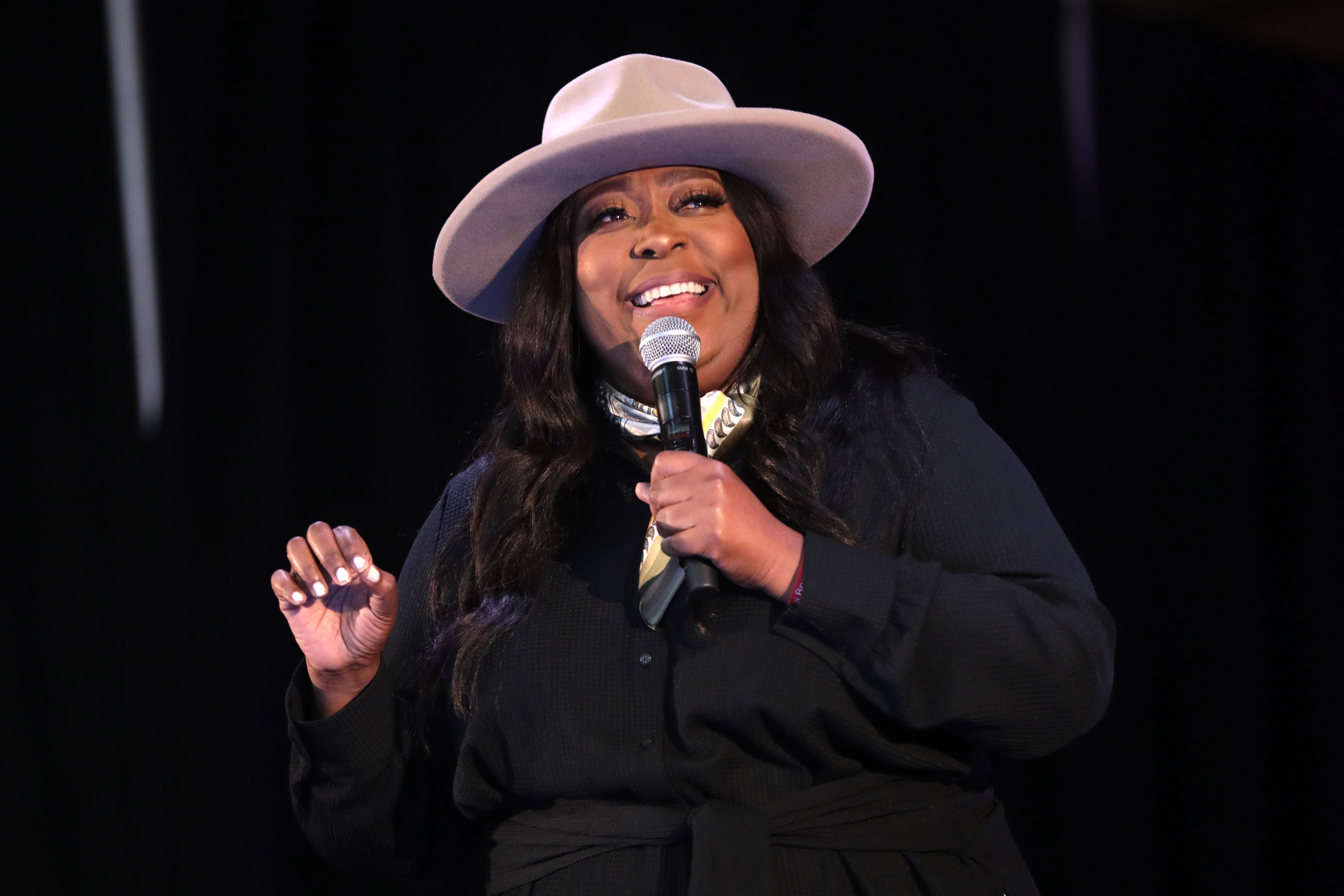
Loni Love (pictured in 2022) is a guest judge.

The episode originally aired on January 22, 2021.

In her film, Tamisha Iman's character Zoltina impersonates Cher. Rosé plays a gnome. Utica Queen's character is a cannabis-consuming hippie. Kahmora Hall wears an outfit for green screen and portrays a tree. Jeffrey Bowyer-Chapman appears in all three films; in April Fool's Rush In, he impersonates Prince.

According to Billboard, Kahmora Hall's "tight-fitting, luxuriously accessorized train gown ... would prove to be fatal" in her lip-sync against Denali. Stephen Daw wrote, "with her movements hindered, Hall was forced to do her best by walking around the stage while Denali kicked, split, and duck-walked her way back into the competition". Denali has said of her performance: "That style of music means a lot to me, and it’s the proudest moment I had on the show!"

Love was later a guest judge on the season's sixth ("Disco-mentary"), tenth ("Freaky Friday Queens"), and twelfth ("Nice Girls Roast") episodes, as well as the fourteenth season's fourth episode ("She's a Super Tease").

=== Fashion ===
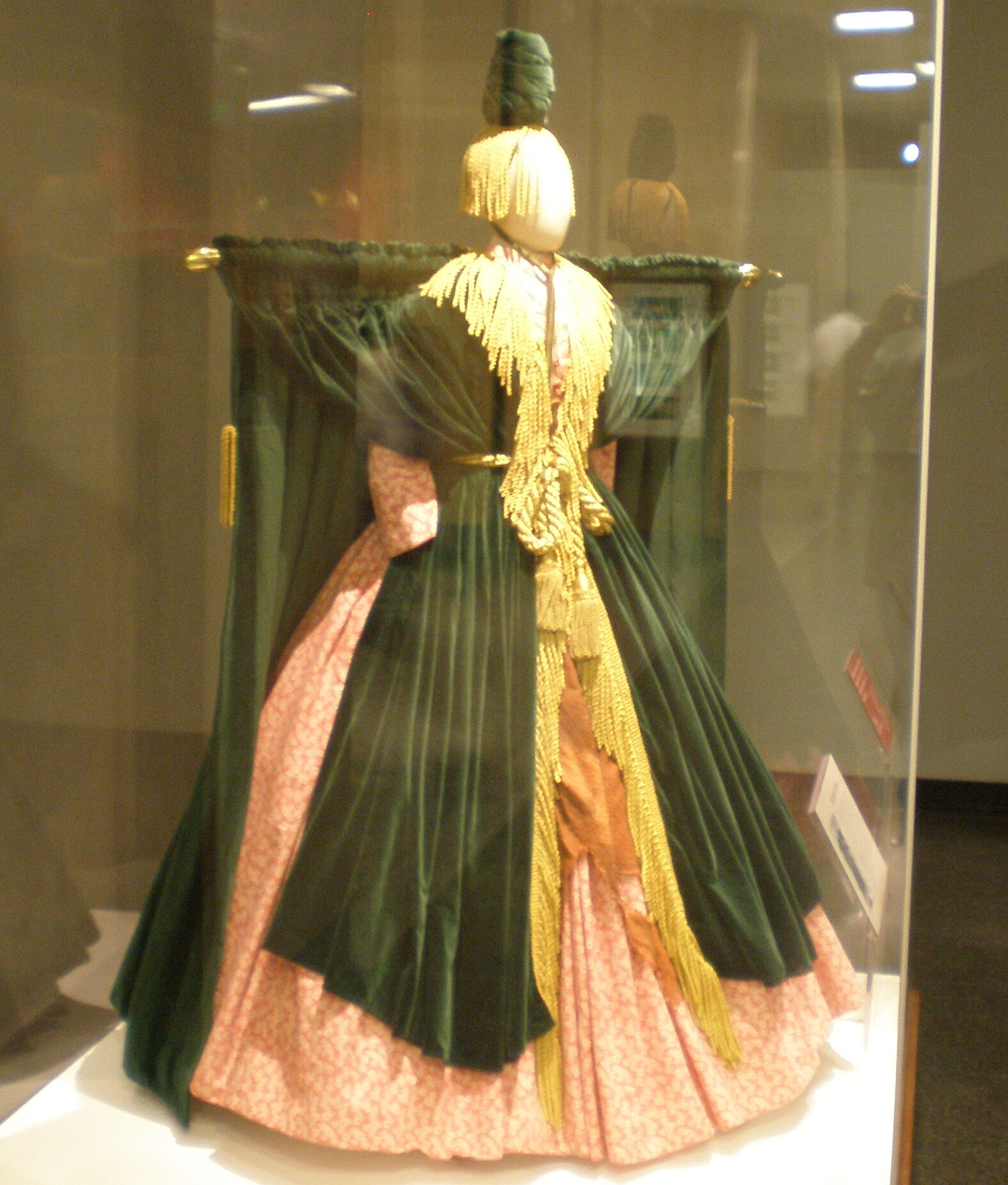
Utica Queen's runway outfit was inspired by the Curtain Dress (pictured on display at the National Museum of American History) designed by Bob Mackie and worn by Carol Burnett during the "Went with the Wind!" comedy sketch that originally aired on The Carol Burnett Show in 1976.

Inspired by Quetzalcoatl and the quetzal bird, Denali's runway look was described by Kate Kulzick of The A.V Club as "full Carnival in a bright, feathered leotard with big structured shoulders, a tall, colorful Mohawk wig, and a massive ostrich feather train". Olivia Lux wears a tall white wig, a coatdress and long train, and a lavender ruffled neck piece with matching boots. Elliott with Two Ts has a white lace bodysuit and a white studded belt, a white ruffled train made of tulle, and tall blonde hair. Kahmora Hall's gold dress has two dragon heads as shoulder pieces, and a dragon tail train in the back. Symone wears a corset and jumpsuit, with a durag that becomes a train.

LaLa Ri wears a belted coat, a bodysuit, and thigh-high boots. Inspired by the "Went with the Wind!" comedy sketch that originally aired on The Carol Burnett Show on CBS in 1976, Utica Queen wears a "hoop dress complete with curtain rod and pull tie belt". Rosé's look has been described as a "true blue pantsuit with striking white lapels and a tall white curled Mohawk with a giant blue tulle train". Gottmik uses a bedazzled leaf blower for wind effects, and Tina Burner's look resembles the uniform of a train conductor. Joey Jay wears a red braid, and Kandy Muse has a red corset. Tamisha Iman wears a pink bodysuit and train.

== Reception ==
Kate Kulzick of The A.V Club gave the episode a rating of 'B+'. Entertainment Weekly said Kimora Hall "made herstory as the queen who looked the best during her elimination". Denali's performance during the lip-sync received both praise and negative criticism, with various outlets consider it among the show's best. Queerty said Denali "stunned" during the performance. The lip-sync caused "100% Pure Love" to re-enter the Billboard charts.
