= Phenomenon (RuPaul's Drag Race) =

- RuPaul's Drag Race episode
- Episode no.: Season 13; Episode 3
- Original air date: January 15, 2021

Guest appearance
- Nicole Byer

Episode chronology
← Previous "Condragulations"	Next → "RuPaulmark Channel"

"Phenomenon" is the third episode of the thirteenth season of the American television series RuPaul's Drag Race. It originally aired on January 15, 2021. The episode's main challenge tasks contestants with writing, recording, and performing choreography to original verses of the song "Phenomenon". Nicole Byer is a guest judge. Denali wins the main challenge after placing in the top two and defeating Rosé in a lip-sync contest to "If U Seek Amy" by Britney Spears.

== Episode ==
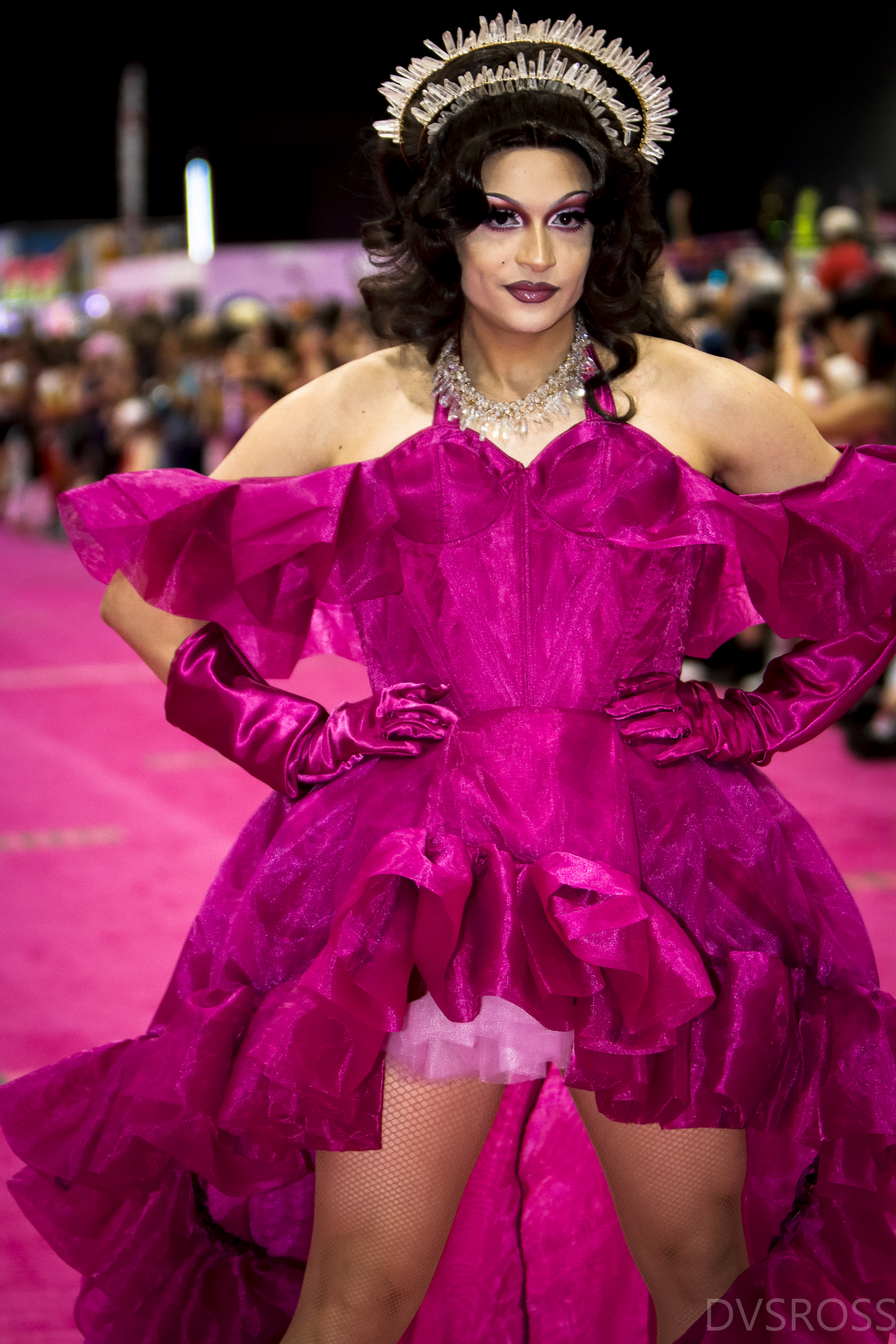
Denali (pictured at RuPaul's DragCon LA in 2022) wins the episode's main challenge.

The group of contestants who won their lip-sync in the first episode (Gottmik, Kandy Muse, LaLa Ri, Olivia Lux, Symone, and Tina Burner), plus Elliott with 2 Ts, return to the Werk Room after Symone won the main challenge on the second episode. On a new day, the contestants who lost their lip-sync in the first episode—Denali, Joey Jay, Kahmora Hall, Rosé, Tamisha Iman, and Utica Queen—enter the Werk Room. RuPaul greets the group and reveals the mini-challenge, which tasks contestants with presenting two looks on the runway in the "Lady and the Vamp" fashion show. The two categories are "Lady" and "Vamp". The contestants prepare for the fashion show in the Werk Room, then walk the runway for RuPaul, Michelle Visage, and Ross Mathews in the main stage area.

Back in the Werk Room, the contestants get out of drag. Tamisha Iman discusses her history of participating in pageants and being a parent. RuPaul returns and reveals the main challenge, which tasks contestants with writing, recording, and performing choreography to original verses of the song "Phenomenon". The contestants write their verses and discuss choreography options, before rehearsing on the main stage. While getting into drag, Kahmora Hall shares about her relationships with both drag and her boyfriend. Tamisha Iman talks about her "drag family", which included the late Tandi Iman Dupree.

On the main stage, RuPaul welcomes fellow judges Michelle Visage and Ross Mathews, as well as guest judge Nicole Byer. The contestants then perform to "Phenomenon". RuPaul shares the runway category ("We're Here, We're Sheer, Get Used to It"), then the contestants present their looks. The judges deliver their critiques, deliberate, then share the results with the contestants. Denali, Rosé, Tamisha Iman, and Utica Queen receive positive critiques. Joey Jay and Kahmora Hall receive negative critiques. Denali and Rosé are declared the top two contestants and face off in a lip-sync contest to "If U Seek Amy" (2009) by Britney Spears for the win. Denali is declared the winner. No contestants are eliminated from the competition.

== Production ==
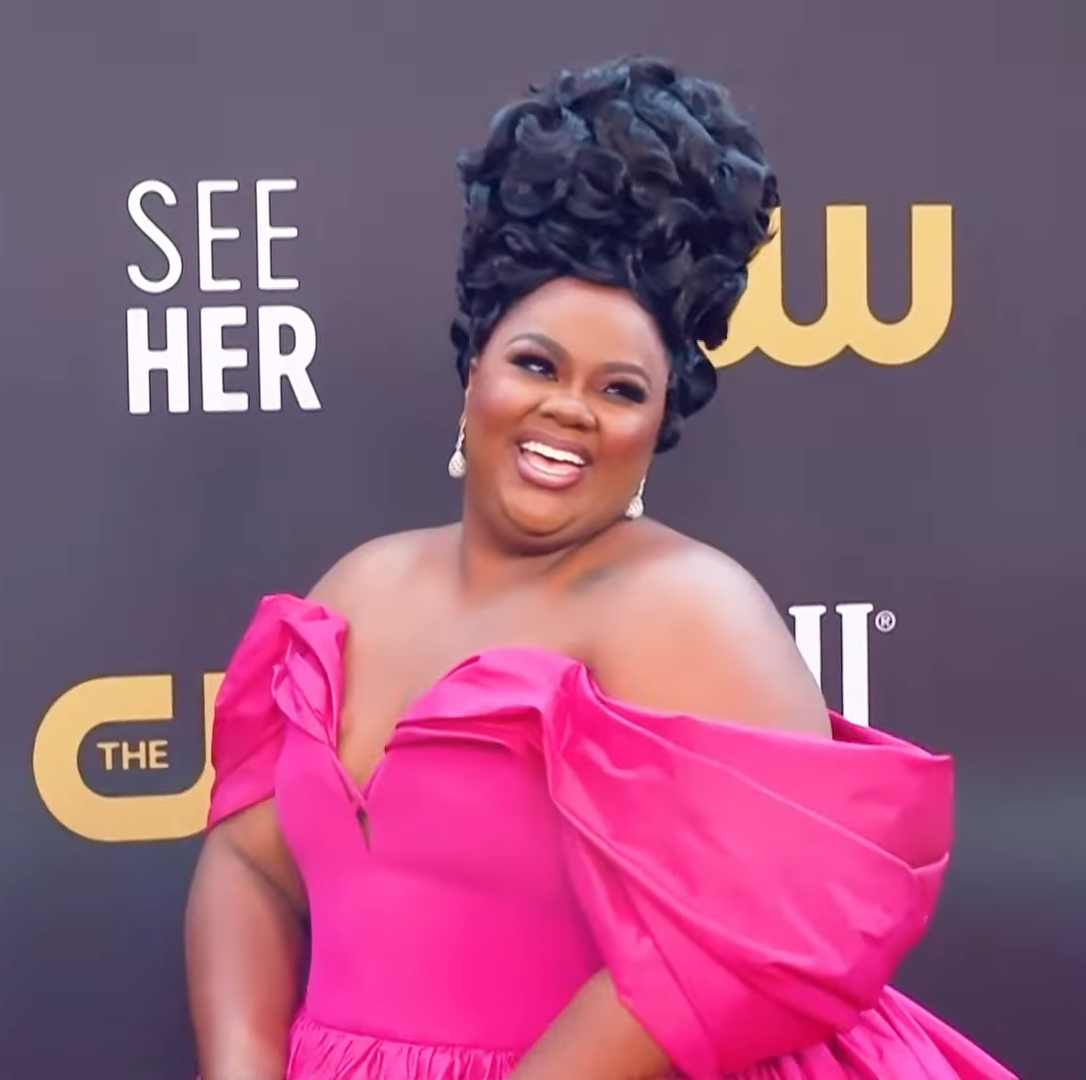
Nicole Byer is a guest judge.

The episode originally aired on January 15, 2021. It features footage of Tandi Iman Dupree's viral performance of "Holding Out for a Hero" at the Miss Gay Black America pageant in 2001.

Byer was also a guest judge on the season's fifth episode, "The Bag Ball".

=== Fashion ===
For the "Lady" category of the mini-challenge, Denali wears a short blue doll dress, a blonde wig, and rhinestoned shoes. Joey Jay wears a vest and sunglasses. Rosé's paper doll-inspired outfit has geometric figures and bright colors. She has a matching handbag and a blonde wig. Tamisha Iman wears harem pants. Utica Queen's colorful 1960s-inspired outfit has balls attached and she carries a toy gun. Kahmora Hall's outfit is white. She wears a fascinator and carries a teacup.

For the "Vamp" category, Denali carries a hand fan. Joey Jay has a black outfit, large earrings, and red hair. Rosé's Alexander McQueen-inspired outfit is black and red. Tamisha Iman's outfit is inspired by Elvira, Mistress of the Dark. Her outfit has hair and she wears a long wig. Kahmora Hall has a black outfit and blood orange hair. Her necklace has a cross. Utica Queen's dress is black and burgundy.

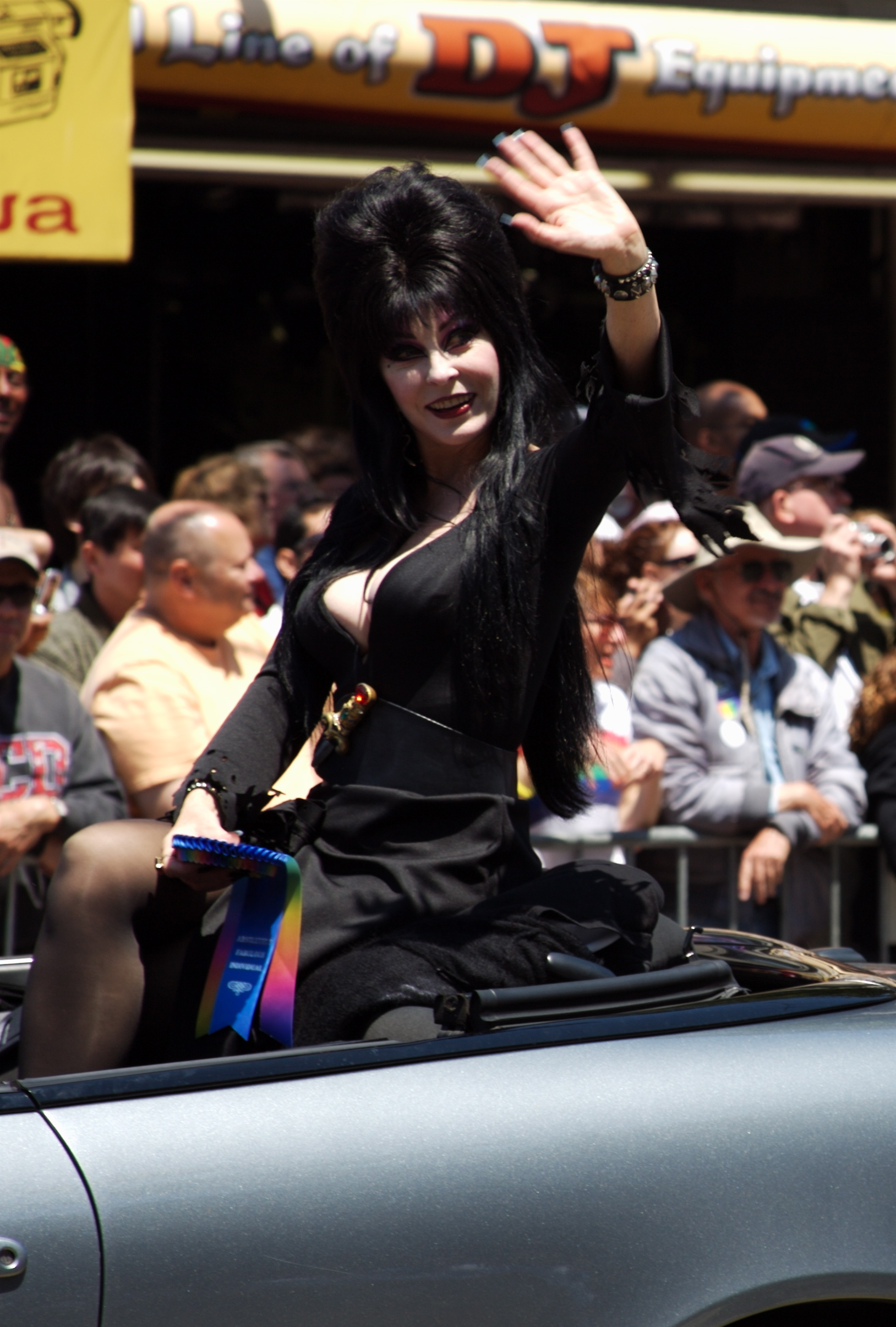
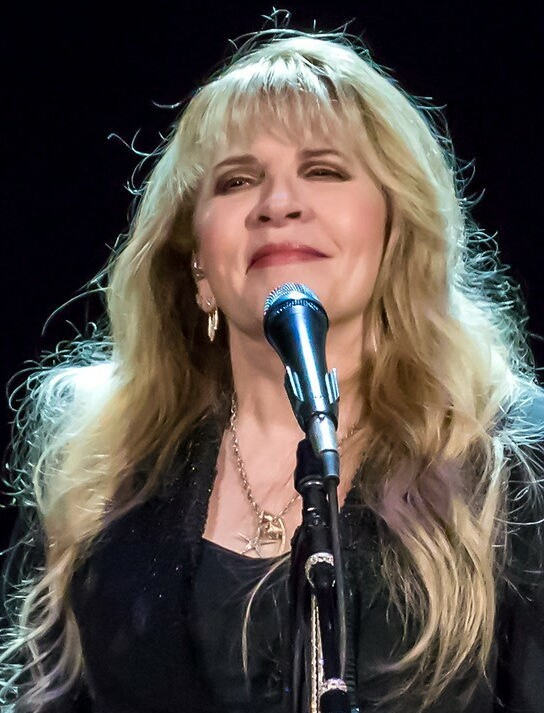
For the final runway, Tamisha Iman and Utica Queen present looks inspired by Elvia, Mistress of the Dark (left) and Stevie Nicks (right, pictured in 2017), respectively.

For the final runway, Denali has a sheer lavender dress and dark hair, earrings, and shoes. She has a long braid. Joey Jay's black outfit has fringe and sequins. She wears a headband. Kahmora Hall's sheer dress is light purple. She has large earrings and a large blonde wig. Rosé has large sleeves and a pink wig. Tamisha Iman's gown has a bustle and glitter. Utica Queen wears a Stevie Nicks-inspired flowy dress and long hair.

== Reception and impact ==
The A.V. Club gave the episode a rating of 'B'. Paul McCallion of Vulture rated the episode four out of five stars. Kevin O'Keeffe of Xtra Magazine said of Denali: "[Her] fighting spirit came across in her verse and performance, which were both sharp and impressive without showing off. She continued to demonstrate just how technically precise she is in her lip-sync to 'If U Seek Amy,' which was one of the better pop dance performances we've seen in a Drag Race lip sync." After the episode aired, "If U Seek Amy" saw a 64.23 percent rise in plays.
