= The Pork Chop =

- RuPaul's Drag Race episode
- Episode no.: Season 13; Episode 1
- Original air date: January 1, 2021

Episode chronology
← Previous "Grand Finale"	Next → "Condragulations"

"The Pork Chop" is the first episode of the thirteenth season of the American television series RuPaul's Drag Race. It originally aired on January 1, 2021. The episodes sees a new group of contestants face-off in a series of lip-sync contests. It received nominations in the Outstanding Hairstyling for a Variety, Nonfiction or Reality Program and Outstanding Makeup for a Variety, Nonfiction or Reality Program categories at the 73rd Primetime Emmy Awards.

== Episode ==
Thirteen new contestants enter the Werk Room. For the main challenge, the contestants face-off in a series of six Lip-Sync for Your Life contests. Joining RuPaul and Michelle Visage on the judging panel are Carson Kressley and Ross Mathews. Following are the contests and results:

- Joey Jay and Kandy Muse lip-sync to "Call Me Maybe" (2011) by Carly Rae Jepsen. Kandy Muse is declared the winner.
- Denali and LaLa Ri lip-sync to "When I Grow Up" (2008) by The Pussycat Dolls. LaLa Ri wins.
- Symone and Tamisha Iman perform to "The Pleasure Principle" (1987) by Janet Jackson. Symone is declared the winner.
- Gottmik and Utica Queen lip-sync to "Rumors" (2004) by Lindsay Lohan. Gottmik wins.
- Olivia Lux and Rosé lip-sync to "Ex's & Oh's" (2014) by Elle King. Olivia Lux is declared the winner.
- Elliott with 2 Ts, Kahmora Hall, and Tina Burner lip-sync to "Lady Marmalade" by Christina Aguilera, Lil' Kim, Mýa, and Pink. Tina Burner wins.

The seven losing contestants are tasked with voting someone out of the competition.

== Production and impact ==
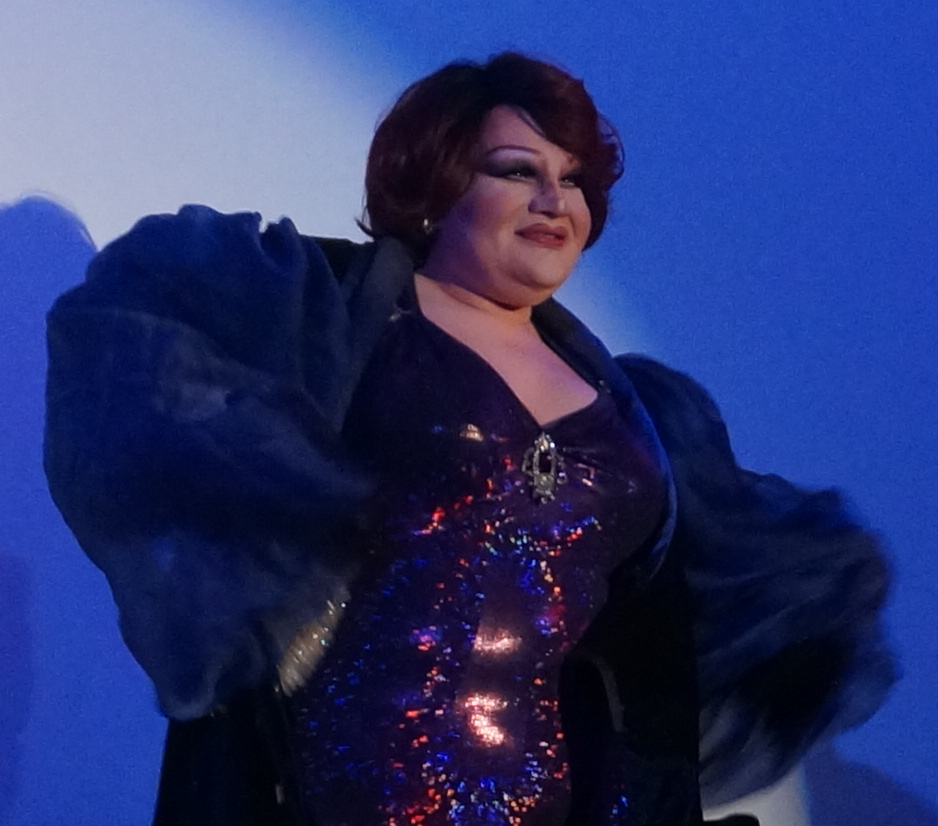
The episode's title refers to Victoria "Porkchop" Parker, the first contestant to be eliminated on the first season of RuPaul's Drag Race.

The episode's title refers to Victoria "Porkchop" Parker, the first contestant to be eliminated on the first season of Drag Race.

According to Gay Times, Denali "serv[ed] kicks, flips and splits" while wearing ice skates. After the episode aired, Denali shared a video of her ice skating and lip-syncing to "When I Grow Up". The video received approximately 1.2 million views by March 2021.

The episode's airing resulted in "Rumors" becoming a "trending topic" on Twitter and seeing an increase of steams by 264.97 percent, according to Variety.

=== Fashion ===
Joey Jay wore a red bodysuit or leotard with "voluminous" chicken feather sleeves, garters, and red beaded high-heeled boots. The outfit shed during the lip-sync contest. Jennifer Goldberg of the Phoenix New Times said Joey Jay's outfit "wasn't exactly conducive, it turned out, to an impromptu performance".

== Reception ==
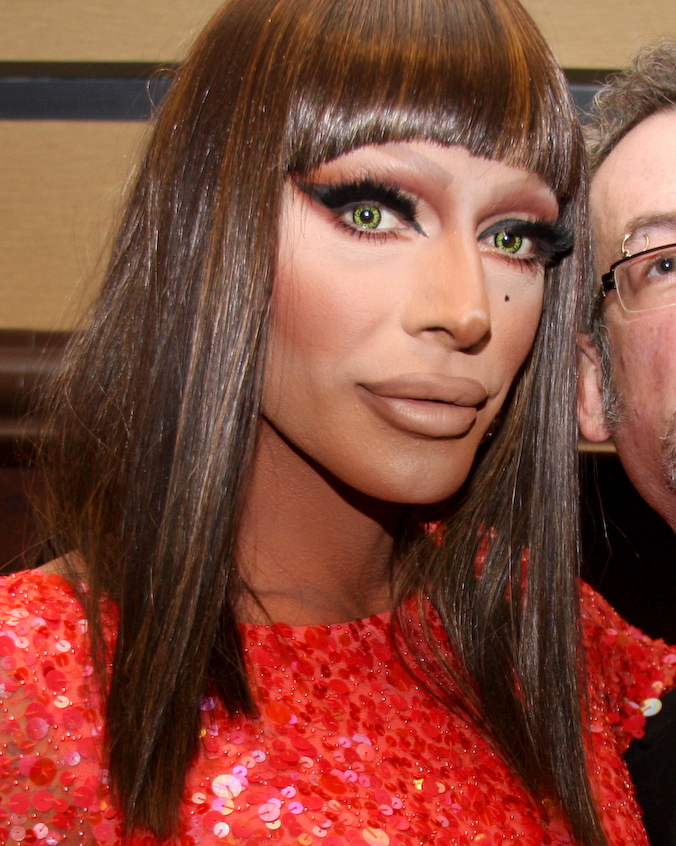
The episode earned former RuPaul's Drag Race contestant Raven (pictured in 2012) a nomination in the Outstanding Makeup for a Variety, Nonfiction or Reality Program category at the 73rd Primetime Creative Arts Emmy Awards.

Kate Kulzick of The A.V. Club gave the episode a rating of 'A-' and said it "was exciting and fun, subverting expectations and keeping the queens on their toes". Kevin O'Keeffee of Xtra Magazine wrote, "It will come as no surprise that I love this premiere, the best in five years. It's my favourite regular-season premiere since Season 8, and my favourite including the spinoffs since All Stars 2. It's fast-paced, fun, genuinely surprising and gives us a lot of hope for what could come next." Evan Hecht of The Diamondback said fans have referred to the episode's challenge as "RuPaul's Stanford prison experiment".

Stephen Daw included the "When I Grow Up" contest in Billboard's 2022 list of ten lip-syncs on the show "that were highway robbery". He wrote, "Both queens absolutely killed this lip sync, no doubt. But let's make one thing clear — Denali did it while wearing literal blades on her feet. Lip syncing in ice skates on a stage (not made out of ice, mind you) without tripping or falling is a ridiculous accomplishment on Denali's part, and one that should have been acknowledged with a win." Sam Damshenas of Gay Times said the episode was the season's best in 2023. He also said Denali "killed" her lip-sync" and Tina Burner's performance of "Lady Marmalade" was among moments that earned her "rave reviews".

Paul McCallion of Vulture gave the episode a rating of three out of five stars. The website's Justin Curto said the lip-sync to "The Pleasure Principle" was the season's "diva moment", with both contestants successfully "competing to embody the diva at hand". Rodney Ho of The Atlanta Journal-Constitution said Tamisha Iman "pulled off very respectable Janet Jackson dance moves" during the performance. Curto said "Rumors" was the season's "song we've been waiting to hear" and opined, "Just imagine the shrieks you would've heard if the gay bars had been open."

=== Accolades ===
The episode earned Curtis Foreman and Ryan Randall nominations in the Outstanding Hairstyling for a Variety, Nonfiction or Reality Program category and David "Raven" Petruschin, Nicole Faulkner, and Jen Fregozo nominations in the Outstanding Makeup for a Variety, Nonfiction or Reality Program category at the 73rd Primetime Creative Arts Emmy Awards.
