= The Bag Ball =

- RuPaul's Drag Race episode
- Episode no.: Season 13; Episode 5
- Original air date: January 29, 2021

Guest appearance
- Nicole Byer

Episode chronology
← Previous "RuPaulmark Channel"	Next → "Disco-mentary"

"The Bag Ball" is the fifth episode of the thirteenth season of the American television series RuPaul's Drag Race. It originally aired on January 29, 2021. The episode's main challenge tasks contestants with creating three looks for a ball. Nicole Byer is a guest judge. Gottmik wins the main challenge and Joey Jay is eliminated from the competition after placing in the bottom two and losing a lip-sync contest against LaLa Ri to "Fancy" by Iggy Azalea featuring Charli XCX.

A fight between Kandy Muse and Tamisha Iman on the corresponding episode of RuPaul's Drag Race: Untucked earned the two a nomination in the Best Fight category at the MTV Movie & TV Awards.

== Episode ==
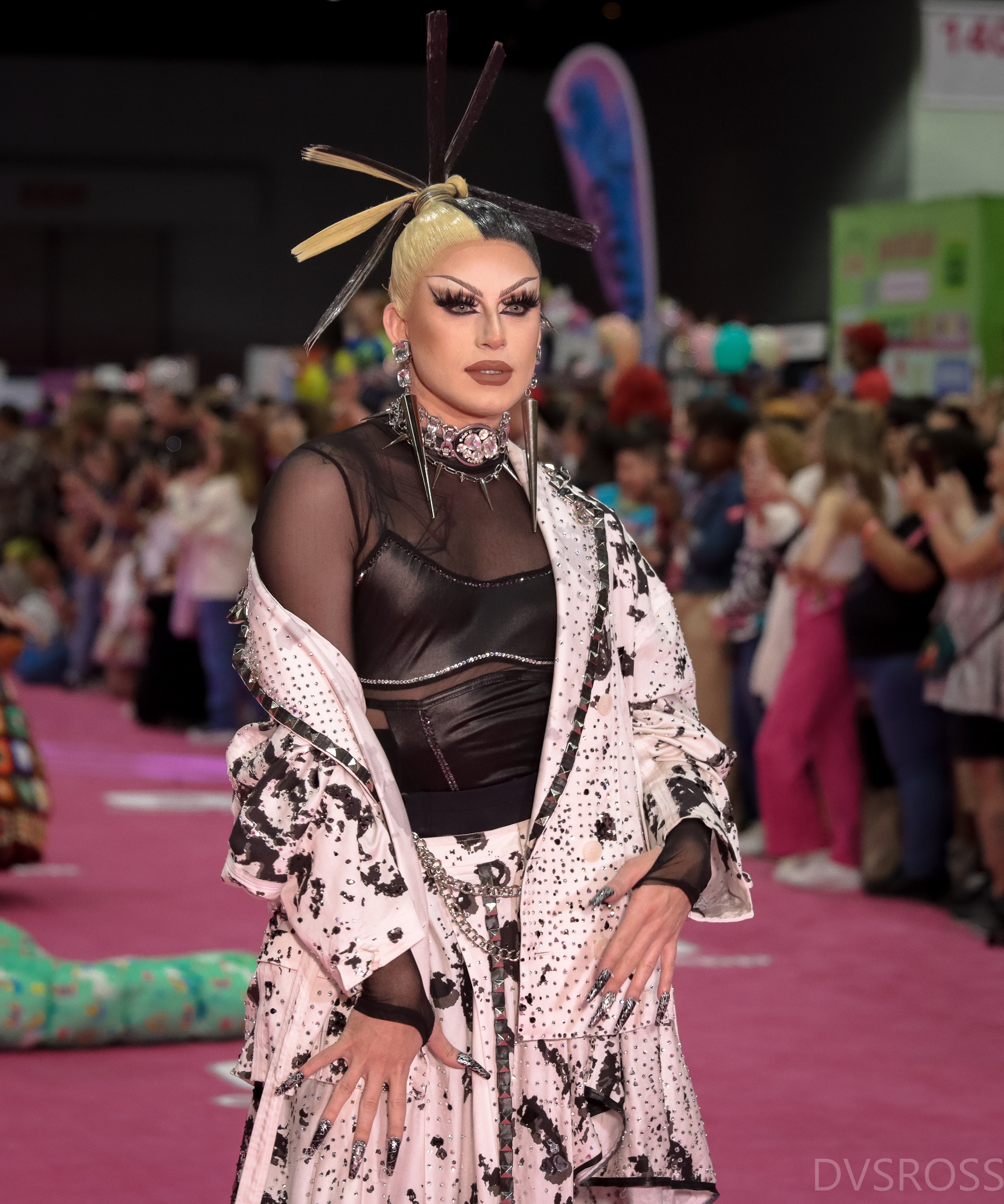
Joey Jay (pictured at RuPaul's DragCon LA in 2023) is eliminated from the competition.

For the episode's mini-challenge, the contestants get into "baby quick drag" to see who is the most misbehaved baby. LaLa Ri is declared the winner. For the main challenge, the contestants are tasked with creating three looks for the Bag Ball, in the categories "Mixed Bag", "Money Bags", and "Bag Ball Eleganza". While preparing for the runway, the contestants discuss the Black Lives Matter movement and the murder of George Floyd.

In addition to RuPaul and Michelle Visage, Carson Kressley is a judge and Nicole Byer is a guest judge. Gottmik, Rosé, and Utica Queen receive positive critiques, and Gottmik wins the challenge. Joey Jay, LaLa Ri, and Tamisha Iman receive negative critiques, and Tamisha Iman is declared safe. Joey Jay and LaLa Ri place in the bottom and face off in a lip-sync to "Fancy" by Iggy Azalea featuring Charli XCX. Joey Jay is eliminated from the competition.

== Production and broadcast ==
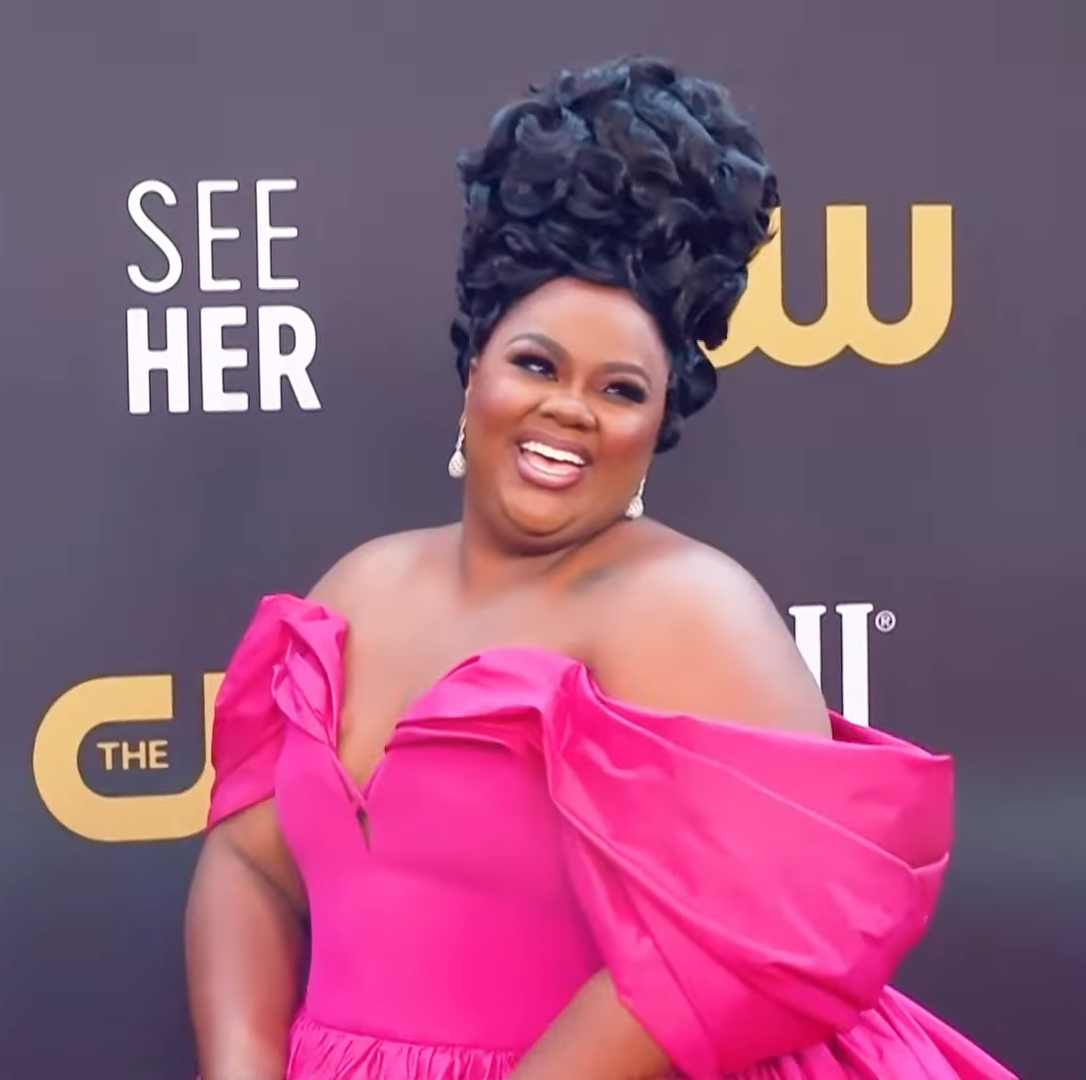
Nicole Byer (pictured in 2022) is a guest judge.

The episode originally aired on January 29, 2021.

Byer was previously a guest judge on the season's third episode, "Phenomenon".

=== Fashion ===
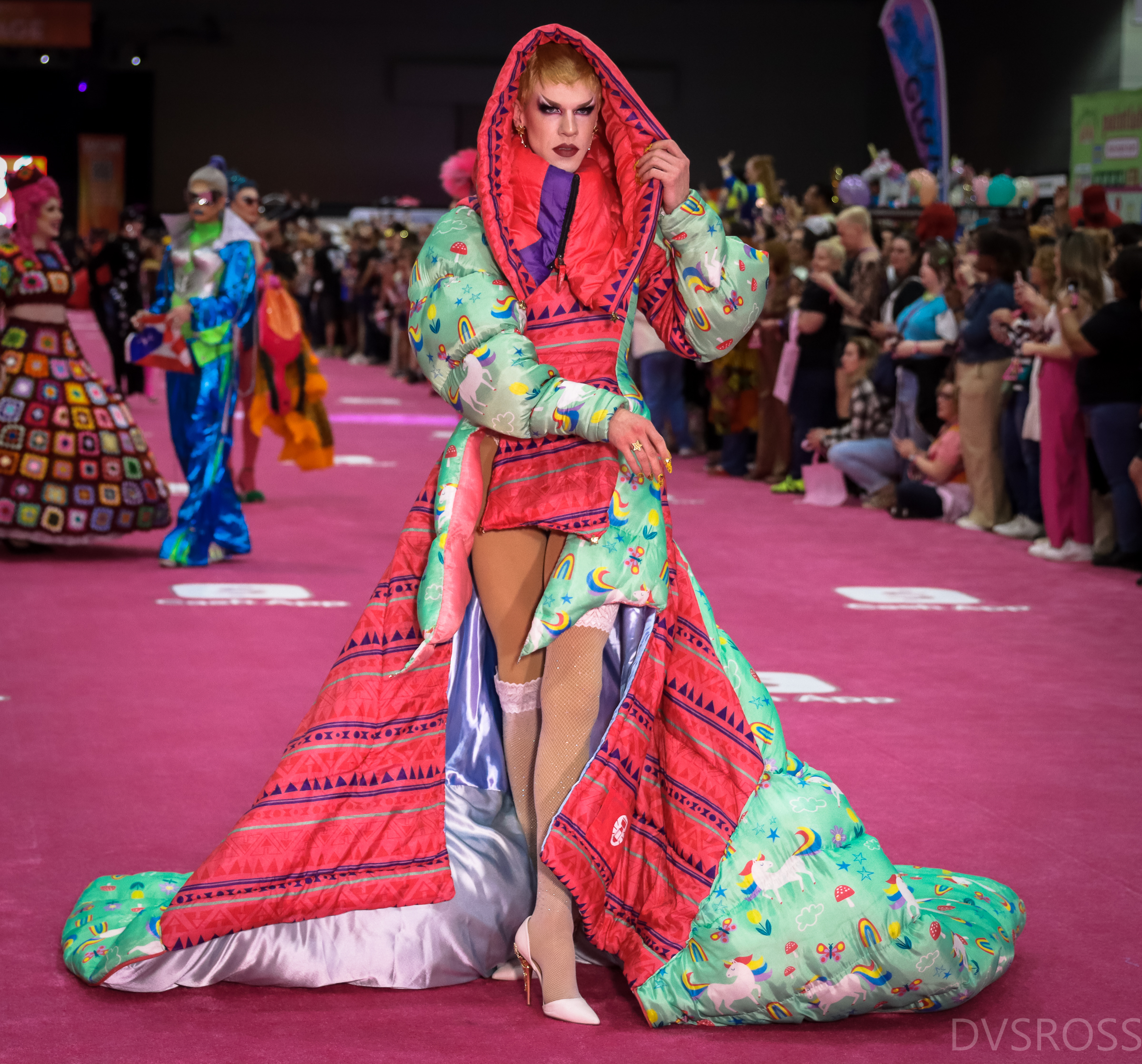
Utica Queen wearing her sleeping bag outfit at RuPaul's DragCon LA in 2023

For "Mixed Bag", Denali's look resembles a crash test dummy and Joey Jay uses an intravenous therapy bag. LaLa Ri's outfit has bones attached. Elliott with 2 Ts wears a dress resembling a gift bag. Symone has exaggerated breasts. Olivia Lux serves Laila Ali-inspired "boxer couture". Gottmik's look gives the illusion of showing her internal organs. Rosé wears an outfit inspired by her Scottish heritage. Tina Burner is dressed like a paper bag.

For "Money Bags", Denali's look is inspired by the fictional character Cruella de Vil, with one of her nails holding a cigarette. Joey Jay wears an eyepatch. LaLa Ri is bald. Symone's pink outfit is reflective, and Olivia Lux wears a cape. Gottmik has a pinstripe suit. Rosé's look is inspired by the 1980s and Bette Midler is Big Business (1988). Kandy Muse carries a large blunt, and Utica Queen's look inspired by Chicago.

For the final category ("Bag Ball Eleganza"), Denali's look commemorates her Mexican heritage. Joey Jay wears a black-and-white polka dot dress. LaLa Ri's outfit is made is small pink and purple gift bags. Elliott with Two Ts wears an outfit made from a bean bag. Symone has a red-and-white miniskirt, and Olivia Lux's outfit is made of holographic bags. Gottmik's outfit is made of drawstring bags and straps. Rosé's outfit has purses, and Tina Burner's red-and-yellow look includes suspenders. Kandy Muse has an outfit made of backpacks, and Utica Queen's dress is made from a sleeping bag.

LaLa Ri's gift bag outfit earned the seasons' Golden Boot Award.

=== Untucked ===
The confrontation between Kandy Muse and Tamisha Iman during the corresponding episode of RuPaul's Drag Race: Untucked "sparked an eruption of fan opinions and is considered one of the best parts of the season", according to Screen Rant. Ryan Shea of Instinct magazine opined, "kudos to the Drag Race people for not teasing Kandy & Tamisha’s blow up ahead of time. We had no idea what we were going into and it was something thrilling to watch from start to finish." The confrontation earned Kandy Muse and Tamisha Iman a nomination in the Best Fight category at the MTV Movie & TV Awards.

== Reception ==
Kate Kulzick of The A.V. Club gave the episode a rating of 'A'. LaLa Ri's bag look spawned viral videos and Halloween costumes. Joey Nolfi of Entertainment Weekly called her bag look both "iconic" and "iconically awful". Bernardo Sim of Out magazine called the look "infamous" and "hilarious", as well as a "fashion fumble". Ruby Wilks of Out Front Magazine called the bag outfit an "infamous ... design mishap". Rebecca Alter of Vulture said LaLa Ri "gave a series-best lip sync in a series-worst outfit". Michel Cuby of Nylon called the lip-sync "spirited" and said Joey Jay "put up a worthy fight".
