= Bossy Rossy RuBoot =

- RuPaul's Drag Race episode
- Episode no.: Season 13; Episode 7
- Original air date: February 12, 2021

Guest appearance
- Ts Madison

Episode chronology
← Previous "Disco-mentary"	Next → "Social Media: The Unverified Rusical"

"Bossy Rossy RuBoot" is the seventh episode of the thirteenth season of the American television series RuPaul's Drag Race. It originally aired on February 12, 2021. The episode's main challenge tasks contestants with improvising in talk show segments. Ts Madison is a guest judge.

Olivia Lux wins the main challenge. LaLa Ri is eliminated from the competition after placing in the bottom and losing a lip-sync contest against Elliott with 2 Ts to "Whole Lotta Woman" by Kelly Clarkson. The episode earned production designer James McGowan and art director Gianna Costa a nomination in the Outstanding Production Design for a Variety or Reality Series category at the 73rd Primetime Creative Arts Emmy Awards.

== Episode ==
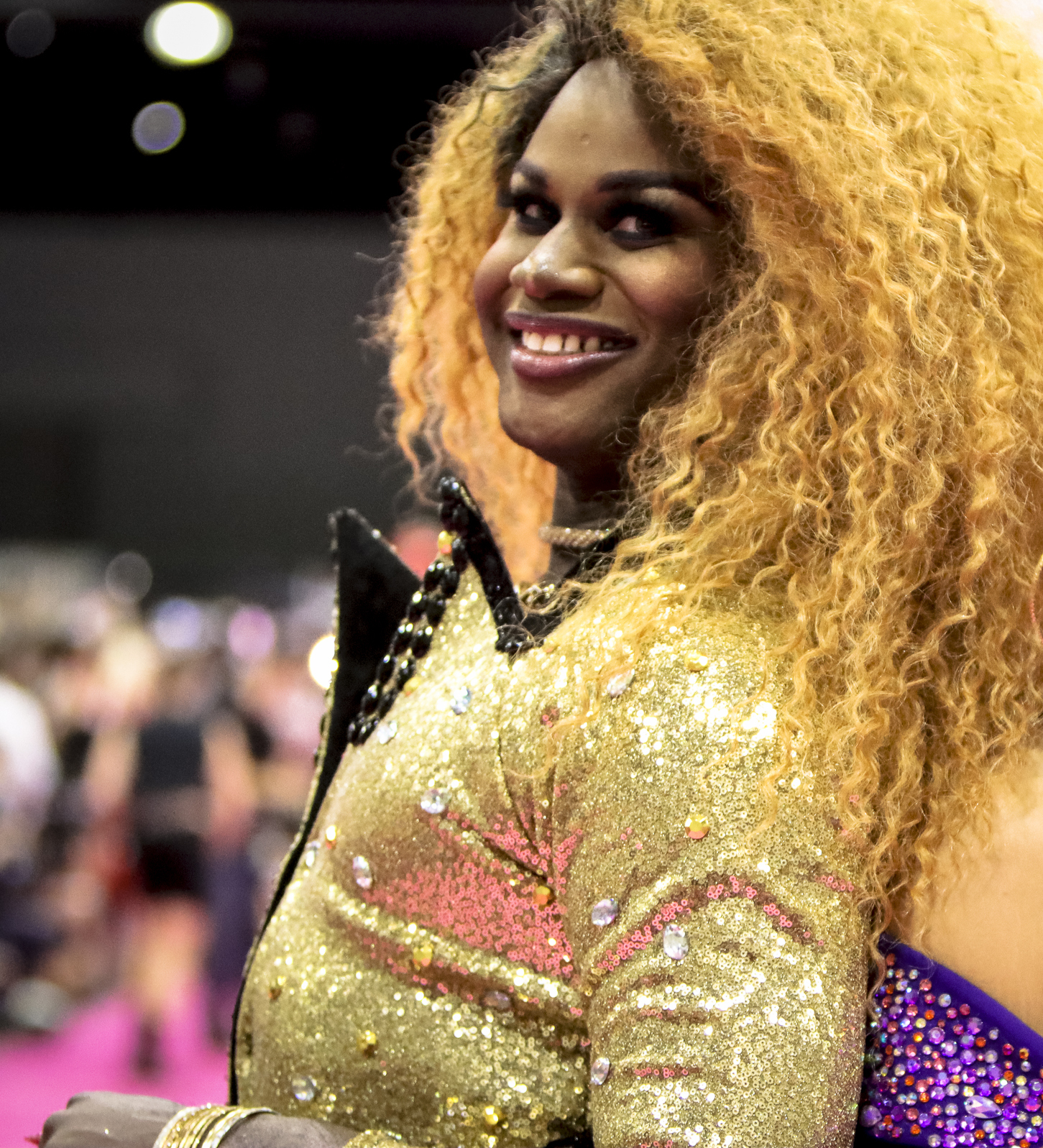
LaLa Ri (pictured at RuPaul's DragCon LA in 2022) is eliminated from the competition.

For the episode's mini-challenge, the contestants are tasked with "reading" (or playfully insulting) each other. Gottmik wins the mini-challenge. For the main challenge, the contestants are tasked with improvising in the new night-time talk show Bossy Rossy After Dark. Following are the segments and team members:

- "I'm Pregnant with My Imaginary Boyfriend's Baby!" – Denali, LaLa Ri, and Rosé
- "Breaking My Silence: Escape from the Cult of Mime-ology!" – Gottmik, Olivia Lux, and Utica Queen
- "Former Teen Queens: Where Are They Now?" – Kandy Muse and Symone
- "My Best Friend's 600 Pound Ass Is Killing our Friendship!" – Elliott with 2 Ts and Tina Burner

In the Werk Room, Symone talks about her brother's imprisonment and its impact on her. Elliott with 2 Ts shares with Tina Burner about a longtime struggle with depression. Other contestants talk about famous talk shows, with some of them portraying a scene from Maury.

On the main stage, RuPaul welcomes judges Michelle Visage and Ross Mathews, as well as guest judge Ts Madison. The runway category is "Bead It". After the contestants present their runway looks, the judges deliver their critiques, deliberate, and share the results with the group. Kandy Muse, Olivia Lux, and Symone receive positive critiques, and Olivia Lux wins the challenge. Elliott with 2 Ts, LaLa Ri, and Utica Queen receive negative critiques, and Utica Queen is deemed safe. Elliott with 2 Ts and LaLa Ri place in the bottom and face off in a lip-sync contest to "Whole Lotta Woman" (2017) by Kelly Clarkson. Elliott with 2 Ts wins the lip-sync and LaLa Ri is eliminated from the competition.

== Production and broadcast ==
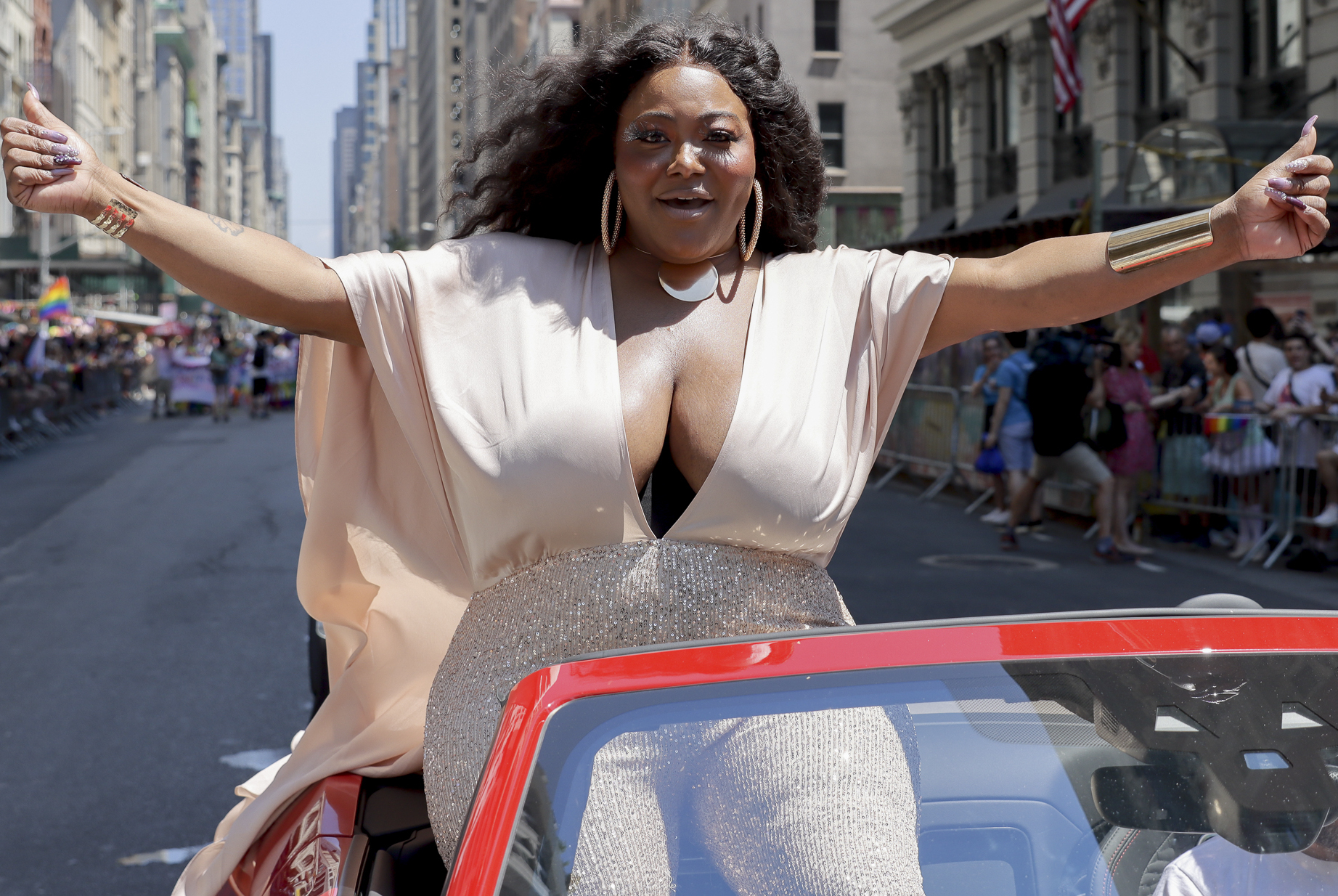
Ts Madison (pictured in 2022) is a guest judge.

The episode originally aired on February 12, 2021.

LaLa Ri said of her elimination: "I defeated myself. I got in my own head. I talked about it in Untucked. I feel like I got in my own way. I don't want to say that I gave up, but I did defeat my own self."

=== Fashion ===
For the fashion show, Denali's outfit resembles a chandelier. LaLa Ri's dress has the colors of Mardi Gras (gold, green, and purpl). Gottmik's dress is 1960s mod-inspired and has a headpiece resembling anal beads. Utica Queen wears a wedding dress, and Kandy Muse has a large hat. Symone's look is inspired by African warriors. Tina Burner also wears a Mardi Gras-inspired outfit, and Elliott with 2 Ts presents a flapper made from Mardi Gras throws.

== Reception ==
Kate Kulzick of The A.V. Club gave the episode a rating of 'B+'. Vulture rated the episode two out of five stars. The website's Justin Curto called "Whole Lotta Woman" the song "we never knew we needed to hear" on the show and said it "was the perfect canvas for all of LaLa Ri and Elliott's shaking, dropping, and gyrating (even if LaLa should've won the lip sync)." Stephen Daw of Billboard called the lip-sync "iconic" and "one of the season’s fiercest lip syncs".

The episode, along with the season's second episode "Condragulations", earned production designer James McGowan and art director Gianna Costa a nomination in the Outstanding Production Design for a Variety or Reality Series category at the 73rd Primetime Creative Arts Emmy Awards.
