= Disco-mentary =

- RuPaul's Drag Race episode
- Episode no.: Season 13; Episode 6
- Original air date: February 5, 2021

Guest appearance
- Loni Love

Episode chronology
← Previous "The Bag Ball"	Next → "Bossy Rossy RuBoot"

"Disco-mentary" is the sixth episode of the thirteenth season of the American television series RuPaul's Drag Race. It originally aired on February 5, 2021. The episode's main challenge tasks contestants with performing in a disco-themed documentary. Loni Love is a guest judge.

Olivia Lux wins the main challenge. Tamisha Iman is eliminated from the competition after placing in the bottom two and losing a lip-sync contest against Kandy Muse to "Hit 'Em Up Style (Oops!)" by Blu Cantrell.

== Episode ==
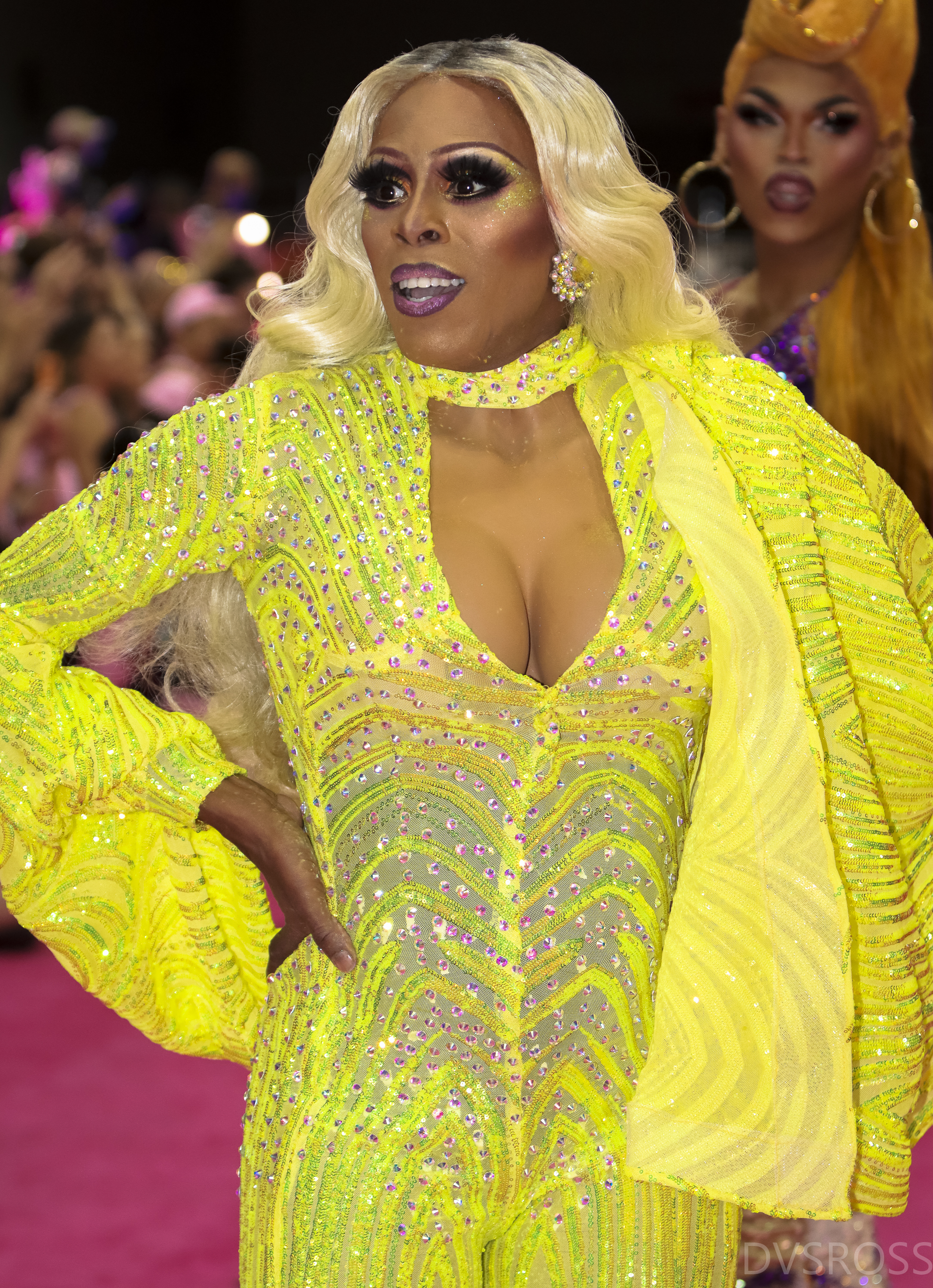
Tamisha Iman (pictured at RuPaul's DragCon LA in 2022) was eliminated from the competition on the episode.

For the mini-challenge, the contestants are tasked with creating dresses made from wallpaper. Elliott with 2 Ts and Tamisha Iman are declared the winners.

For the main challenge, the contestants are tasked with performing a history of disco, divided into five team segments:

- The Birth of Disco – Gottmik, Kandy Muse, and Tina Burner
- Disco & Sex – Elliott with 2 Ts and Tamisha Iman
- Studio 54 – Olivia Lux and Utica Queen
- Disco Fashion – Denali and Rosé
- Disco Sucks – LaLa Ri and Symone

In the Werk Room, RuPaul talks about the disco ethos as well as Disco Demolition Night (1979). On the runway, the category is "Little Black Dress". In addition to RuPaul and Michelle Visage, Carson Kressley is a judge and Loni Love is a guest judge.

Elliott with 2 Ts, Olivia Lux, and Tina Burner receive positive critiques, and Olivia Lux wins the challenge. Kandy Muse, Tamisha Iman, and Utica Queen receive negative critiques, and Utica Queen is deemed safe. Kandy Muse and Tamisha Iman place in the bottom two and face off in a lip-sync to "Hit 'Em Up Style (Oops!)" (2001) by Blu Cantrell. Kandy Muse wins the lip-sync and Tamisha Iman is eliminated from the competition.

== Production and broadcast ==
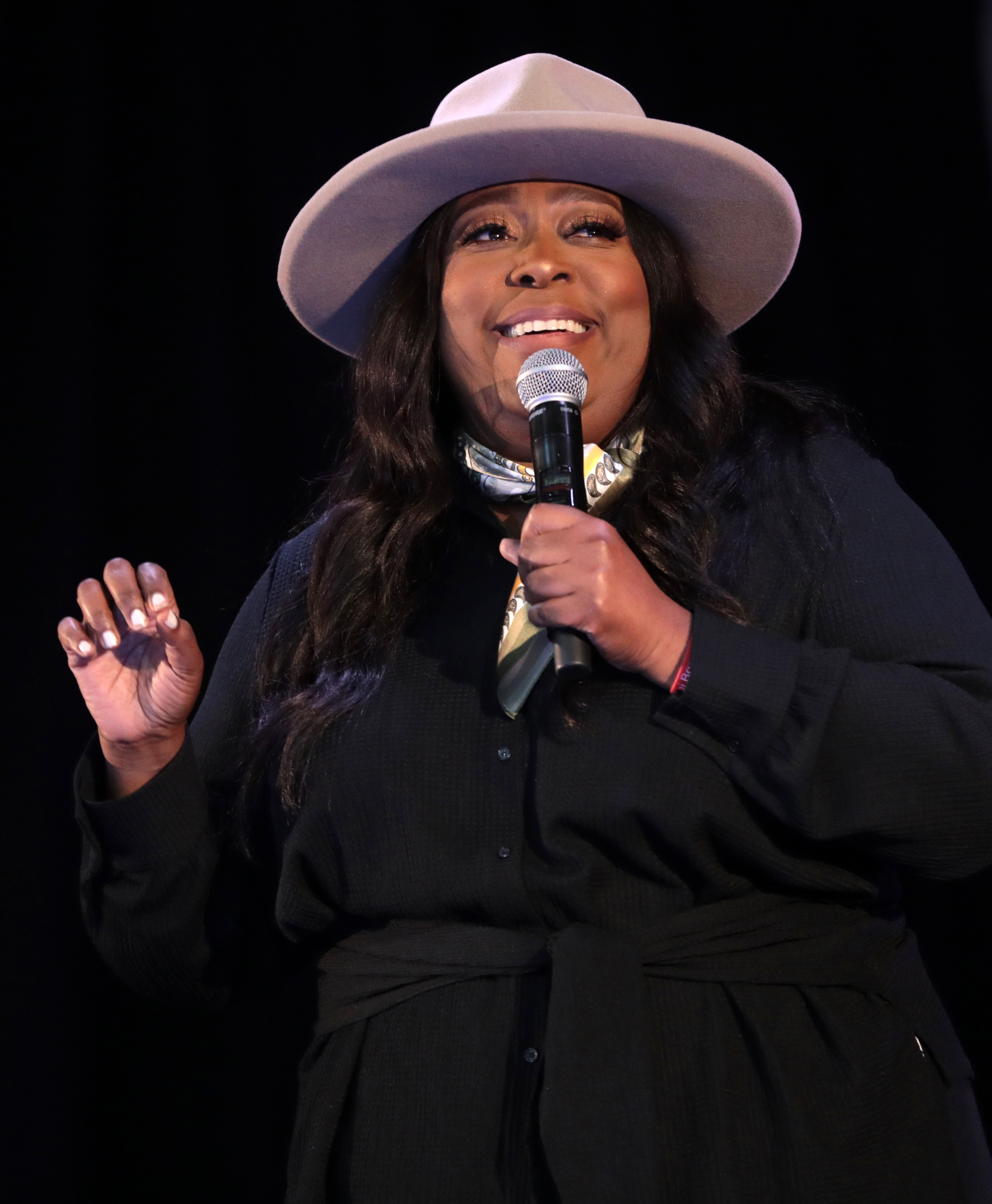
Loni Love (pictured in 2022) is a guest judge.

The episode originally aired on February 5, 2021.

=== Fashion ===
For the fashion show, Tina Burner's look includes a "reveal". Kandy Muse wears a Comme des Garçons-inspired outfit. Gottmik is nearly nude. Utica Queen's look is inspired by Audrey Hepburn. Denali's "black widow" dress is inspired by arachnids. Symone's dress is made with hair braids.

== Reception ==
Kate Kulzick of The A.V. Club gave the episode a rating of 'B-'. Michael Cuby described the lip-sync contest as a "no-holds-barred battle". In 2022, Screen Rant's Amaya Lynch opined: "Season 13 ... was an all-around disappointment, and many of its episodes have fallen claim to low user ratings. The 'Disco-Mentary' was yet another one of those episodes, and for good reason. Even more than usual, one can practically see producers pulling the strings behind the scenes." Lynch also wrote, "Tamisha Iman had a rocky run on the season, but when she happened to end up in the bottom with Kandy Muse after they had an explosive argument in Untucked the week before, it was clear that production was playing into the drama. The judging for the episode is also confusing, with the queens selected as the tops and the bottoms making little sense."
