= Condragulations =

- RuPaul's Drag Race episode
- Episode no.: Season 13; Episode 2
- Original air date: January 8, 2021

Guest appearance
- Jamal Sims

Episode chronology
← Previous "The Pork Chop"	Next → "Phenomenon"

"Condragulations" is the second episode of the thirteenth season of the American television series RuPaul's Drag Race. It originally aired on January 8, 2021. The episode's main challenge tasks contestants with writing, recording, and performing choreography to original verses for RuPaul's song "Condragulations". Choreographer Jamal Sims is a guest judge.

Symone wins the episode's main challenge, after placing in the top two and winning a lip-sync contest against Olivia Lux to "Break My Heart" by Dua Lipa. The episode received a nomination in the Outstanding Production Design for a Variety or Reality Series category at the 73rd Primetime Creative Arts Emmy Awards.

== Episode ==
The start of the episode reveals that Elliott with 2 Ts was voted out. On a new day, the winning contestants from the previous episode enter the Werk Room. RuPaul greets the group and introduces Elliott with 2 Ts, who will continue to compete. RuPaul recognizes some of the show's first contestants to be eliminated in their season, including Victoria "Porkchop" Parker and Vanessa Vanjie Mateo. RuPaul then reveals the mini-challenge, which tasks contestants with showing two looks on the runway for the categories "Day Time Drama Mama" and "Night Time Is the Right Time". In the Werk Room, the contestants prepare for the fashion show. The contestants the present their looks to RuPaul, Michelle Visage, and Ross Mathews in the main stage area.

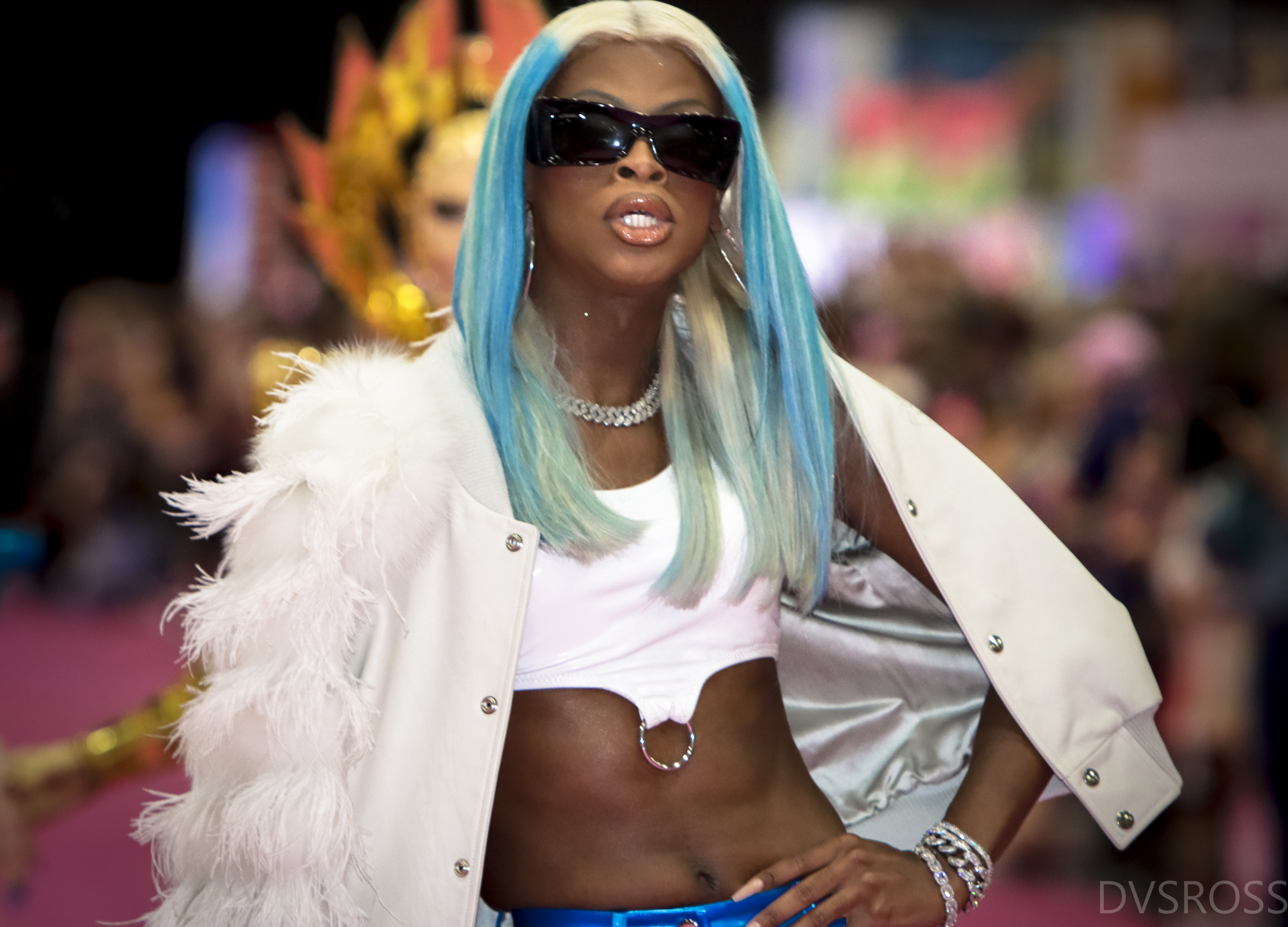
Symone is the winner of the episode's main challenge.

Back in the Werk Room, the contestants get out of drag. RuPaul arrives and introduces the main challenge, which tasks contestants with writing, recording, and performing choreography to original verses for RuPaul's song "Condragulations". The contestants write their verses in the Werk Room, then rehearse choreography on the main stage. Gottmik struggles to focus after hearing her vocals, which address her gender identity, before she has the chance to discuss the topic with her fellow contestants. Back in the Werk Room, the contestants prepare for the performance. Gottmik discusses her gender identity and dysphoria with Olivia Lux; the two also talk about their preferred gender pronouns. Elliott with 2 Ts shares with the group what happened with the vote at the start of the season. The contestants share who they would send home at this point in the competition.

On the main stage, RuPaul welcomes fellow judges Visage and Mathews, as well as guest judge Jamal Sims. RuPaul then reveals the runway category: "Lamé You Stay". The contestants perform "Condragulations", then present their looks for the fashion show. The judges deliver their critiques, deliberate, then share the results with the contestants. Elliott with 2 Ts, LaLa Ri, Olivia Lux, Symone, and Tina Burner receive positive critiques. Gottmik and Kandy Muse receive negative critiques. Olivia Lux and Symone are the top two contestants of the week and face off in a lip-sync contest to "Break My Heart" (2020) by Dua Lipa for the win and a $5,000 tip. Symone is declared the winner.

== Production ==
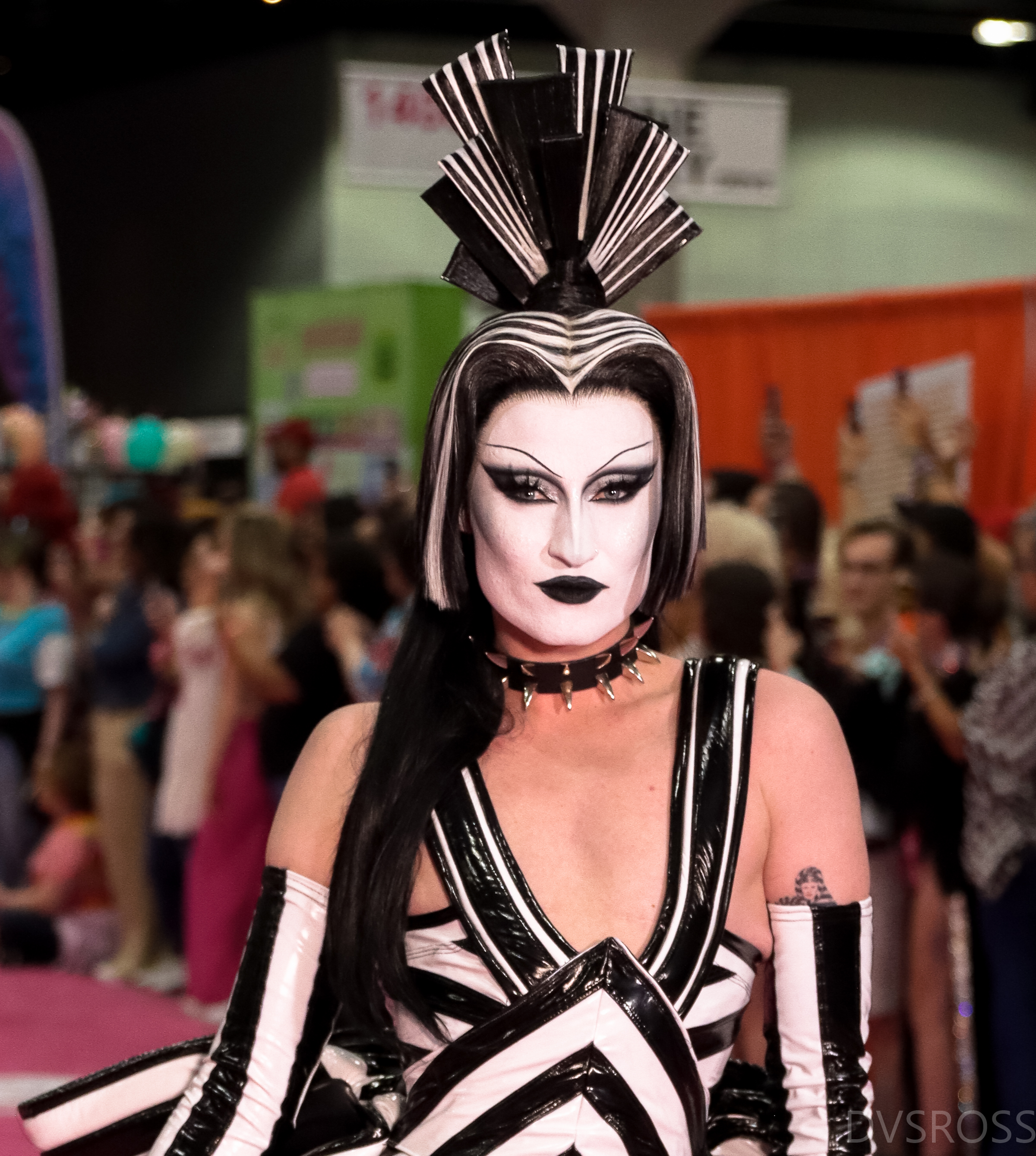
Gottmik (pictured at RuPaul's DragCon LA in 2023) addresses gender identity in her original verse and in the Werk Room.

The original version of "Condragulations", which is inspired by one of RuPaul's catchphrases, appears on the studio album You're a Winner, Baby (2020). Gottmik's verse for the song addresses her gender identity and dysphoria. She also discusses the topics in the Werk Room and on Untucked.

Sims was a guest judge and choreographer on the eighth season's "Bitch Perfect" (2016), the twelfth season's "Viva Drag Vegas" (2020), and the thirteenth season's "Social Media: The Unverified Rusical" (2021). He was solely guest choreographer on the seventh season's "Glamazonian Airways" (2015), the twelfth season's "Madonna: The Unauthorized Rusical" (2020), and the thirteenth season's "Gettin' Lucky" (2021). On the sixth season (2021) of RuPaul's Drag Race All Stars, Sims was a guest judge and choreographer on "Halftime Headliners" and solely a guest choreographer on the finale "This Is Our Country".

=== Fashion ===
==== Mini-challenge ====
For the mini-challenge's "Day Time Drama Mama" category, Gottmik wears a blue latex dress with a rainbow. She carries a sun prop. Kandy Muse has a red dress and a blonde wig. LaLa Ri wears a green-colored dress with a floral print, as well as braids. Olivia Lux's dress is yellow and purple. She has sunglasses and carries and small purse. Symone's 1990s-inspired multi-colored outfit has a cape. Tina Burner's dress is orange and has a large bow. Elliott with 2 Ts wears a red dress and a matching hat.

For the "Night Time Is the Right Time" category, Gottmik wears a black dress with a pasty on her chest. Kandy Muse presents another red look, this time with horns on her shoulders. Her wig is blonde. LaLa Ri has a black dress and a red wig. Olivia Lux's dress is purple. She has dark hair and carries another small handbag. Symone has a wig with braids and she carries a purse. Tina Burner has an orange-and-yellow latex outfit. She has tall red boots and a long braid. Elliott with 2 Ts has a black dress and a hat with feathers on top.

==== Main challenge and final runway ====
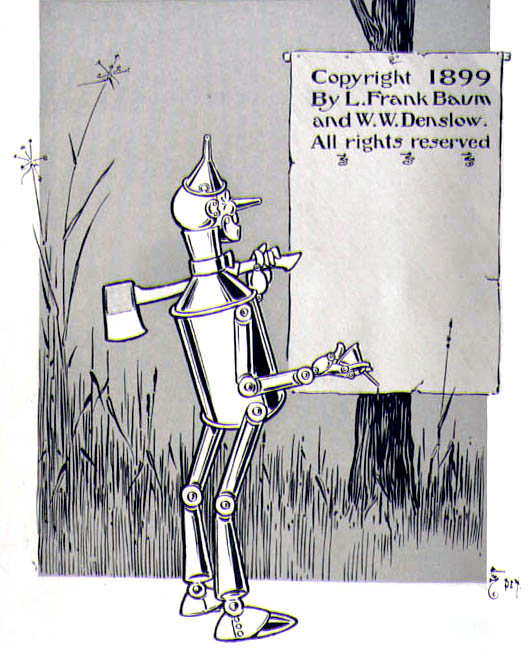
Tina Burner wears a look inspired by the Tin Woodman from The Wizard of Oz; pictured is an illustration by W. W. Denslow from The Wonderful Wizard of Oz, a 1900 children's novel by L. Frank Baum.

For the "Condragulations" performance, Gottmik wears a black dress and a blonde wig. Kandy Muse has a black latex outfit with an animal print. LaLa Ri has large black sleeves and black boots. Olivia Lux's dress is blue and gold. She has a large blonde wig. Symone has a blue dress, a blonde wig, and nude high heels. Tina Burner's outfit is her signature yellow and red. She also has gold-plated feathers on her shoulders. Elliott with 2 Ts also wears an outfit with an animal print. She has a blonde wig and black boots.

For the final runway's "Lamé You Stay" category, Gottmik presents a gold outfit inspired by sea-dragons. Kandy Muse wears a purple outfit with white boots and gloves. LaLa Ri's outfit is also gold. Olivia Lux's dress is green and white. She has a lily on her shoulder. Symone wears boxing gloves and blonde braids. She has a "cut" on one of her eyebrows. Tina Burner's silver look is inspired by the Tin Woodman from The Wizard of Oz. Elliott with 2 Ts wears a blue-and-green dress and a red wig.

== Reception ==
Kate Kulzick of The A.V. Club gave the episode a rating of 'B'. Kevin O'Keeffe of Xtra Magazine said Gottmik's verse was "less impressive". The episode, along with the season's seventh episode "Bossy Rossy RuBoot", earned production designer James McGowan and art director Gianna Costa a nomination in the Outstanding Production Design for a Variety or Reality Series category at the 73rd Primetime Creative Arts Emmy Awards.
