= Whole Lotta Woman (Kelly Clarkson song) =

Song by Kelly Clarkson

from the album Meaning of Life
- Recorded: 2017
- Studio: The Ribcage (Los Angeles, CA); Vox Recording (Los Angeles, CA); Starstruck Studios (Nashville, TN)
- Genre: Soul; trap
- Length: 2:53
- Label: Atlantic
- Songwriters: Evon Barnes Jr.; Denisia "Blu June" Andrews; Kelly Clarkson; Brittany "Chi" Coney; Jussi Karvinen; Jesse Shatkin
- Producers: Jesse Shatkin; Jussifer; Fade Majah; NOVA wav

"Whole Lotta Woman" is a song performed by American singer Kelly Clarkson from her eighth studio album Meaning of Life (2017). It is co-written by Clarkson and its producers—Jussifer, NOVA Wav duo Denisia Andrews and Brittany Coney, Fade Majah, and Jesse Shatkin. A soul anthem about female empowerment, the singer declares herself as a "whole lotta woman" and challenges men to "accept it or walk away". Songwriters put a "fun twist" in the lyrics to allude to the size of Clarkson's waistline, her attitude, her self-worth, and her mouth. Members of the American soul band Earth, Wind & Fire, led by bass player Verdine White, are featured in the song.

On the week of the album's release, Clarkson premiered "Whole Lotta Woman" in a live performance on The Tonight Show Starring Jimmy Fallon. In celebration of the 2018 International Day of the Girl Child, Clarkson performed the song on The Today Show.

Critical reception of the song was mixed. It reached number 142 on Billboard's US Digital Songs chart.

== Writing and composition ==
"That day [in the studio] I was like, 'You know what I'm tired of? I'm tired of people running their mouth. I am a whole lotta woman — accept it or walk away!'"

— Clarkson on recording "Whole Lotta Woman"

"Whole Lotta Woman" was co-written by Clarkson and producers Jussifer (Jussi Karvinen), NOVA Wav (Denisia Andrews and Brittany Coney), Fade Majah (Evon Barnes Jr.), and Jesse Shatkin. In a feature on Rolling Stone, Clarkson commented that the song stemmed from a conversation she had with the NOVA Wav duo in a session in Los Angeles. She recalled, "It was really fun to talk to them about how it took me awhile to fall in love because I am a whole lot of woman – I have a big personality. I'm a grown-ass woman that can pay her bills, and I make a lot of money. That's intimidating." Clarkson, who grew up in Texas, remarked in a profile on The New York Times that the song's inspiration came from the challenges of being a financially secure woman looking for a man after internalizing the paradoxes of growing up in the South. Clarkson says that in the South women are told, "We want to educate you and we want you to be intelligent, but not too intelligent to where you're intimidating; we want you to be beautiful, but not too sexy to where you're a slut; we want you to be successful but not so successful that you make someone feel uncomfortable.” As a female pop singer, Clarkson has expressed frustration that for years her appearance, particularly her weight, has been a constant topic of discussion. This led her to write a song that said "Yeah, you're right, I am a whole lot of woman, and it's ok. I came with a brain, and I came with drive and passion and sensuality, and these things that are awesome. If you can't handle it, that's totally cool, but you're not tall enough to ride this ride, then move along. It's fine."

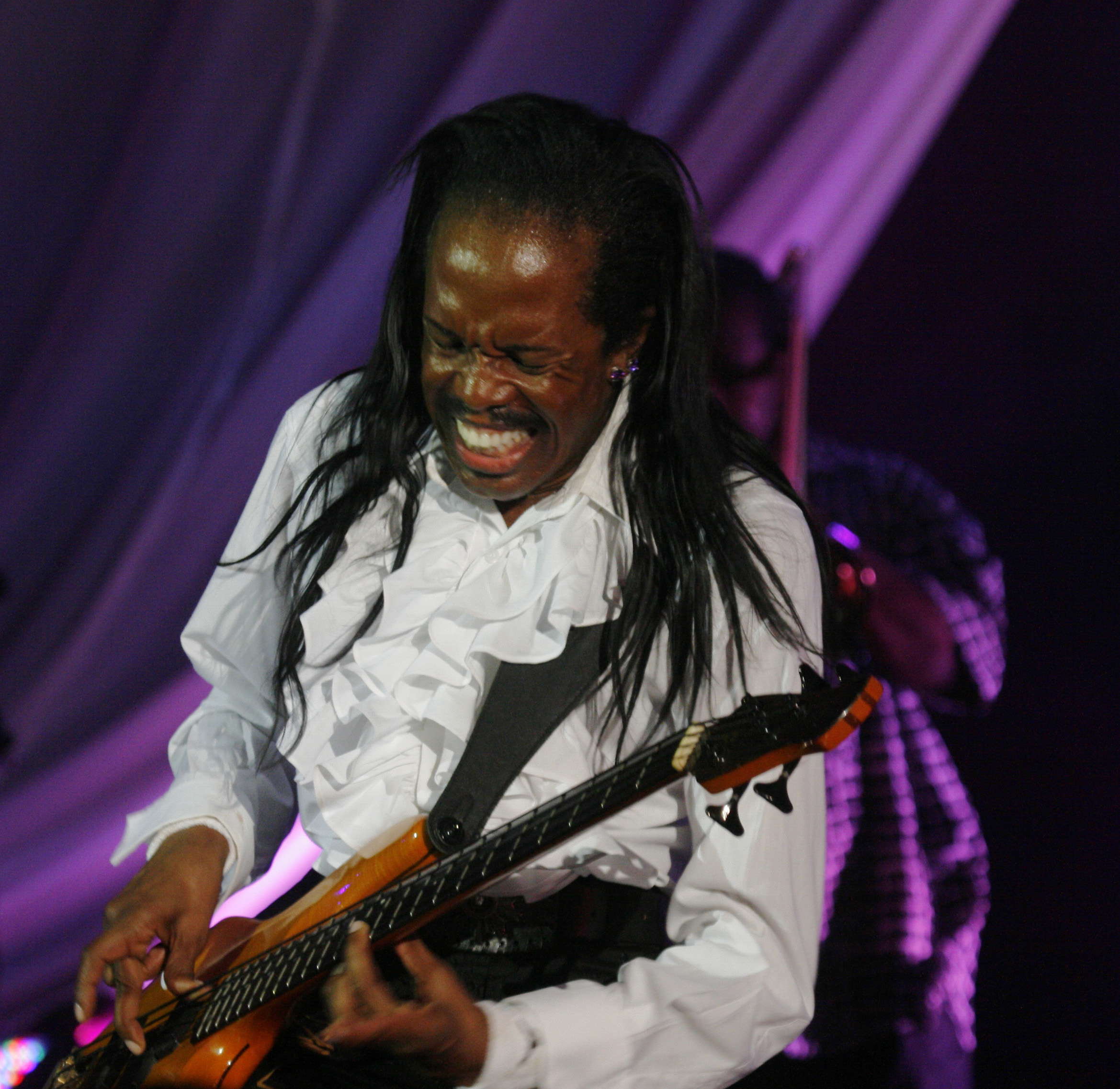
Members of the American soul band Earth, Wind & Fire, led by bass player Verdine White (pictured), were invited by Atlantic Records CEO Craig Kallman to play on the track.

"Whole Lotta Woman" is an anthem that utilizes a bass-heavy groove. The lyrics allude to the size of Clarkson's waistline, her attitude, her self-worth, and her mouth using references to Southern cooking and singer Tina Turner. Maura Johnston of Rolling Stone says "the music recalls classic soul anthems like 'Respect' while also having the pop of Janet Jackson's Rhythm Nation-era output like 'Black Cat.'" Craig Kallman, CEO of Atlantic Records, executive produced the album with Clarkson, and commissioned the horn section of Earth, Wind & Fire, along with its bass player, Verdine White, to perform on the song.

== Critical reception ==
In a feature in The New York Times, Caryn Ganz described the song as a "feisty throwdown" and a centerpiece to Meaning of Life. Stacey Leasca of Glamour picked the track as the favorite from the album. Idolator's Mike Wass referred it as one of the album's highlights. Reviewing the album for The Atlantic, Spencer Kornhamer wrote that the song verges on "the edge of feeling like costume play—but Clarkson connects the revival-church sound to her biography, playing up her Texan bona fides" and praised its outro as "fascinating, mutating into a trap breakdown but with women singing that style's 'hey' rhythm like doo-wop." Glenn Gamboa of Newsday observed that Clarkson looks to innovate as "she takes a throwback soul arrangement to the song and adds intricate, current R&B phrasing and lyrics like 'I'm a strong, bad-ass chick with classic confidence' to create something new".

Los Angeles Times' Michael Wood noted that "she lays out the makings of a 'badass chick with classic confidence' in the song, but ends up with a 'pile of Southern clichés'" and added that it "plays like a female answer to 'Boys 'Round Here'" by Blake Shelton. Hannah Davies of The Guardian wrote that song feels like "a filler", and described its "body-positive pop" as sticking a "little too closely to the Meghan Trainor mould." Whereas Spin magazine's Katherine St. Asaph wrote that the song's lyrics felt "forced" and described it as "where soul becomes vaguely appropriative, sub-Austin Powers caricature."

== Live performances ==
To promote the album's release, Clarkson debuted "Whole Lotta Woman" in a performance on The Tonight Show Starring Jimmy Fallon on October 31, 2017. She also filmed a "Nashville Sessions" performance of the song at the War Memorial Auditorium in Nashville, Tennessee, which was released on November 2, 2017. Clarkson showcased the song on the Carpool Karaoke segment of The Late Late Show with James Corden, the 2017 Dick Clark's New Year's Rockin' Eve, and in live performances at the 2018 Billboard Music Awards and the iHeartRadio Music Festival. On October 11, 2018, in celebration of the 2018 International Day of the Girl Child, Clarkson performed the song in a special presentation on The Today Show to help the launch of the Global Girls Alliance educational campaign by former First Lady of the United States Michelle Obama.

== Credits and personnel ==
Credits from the album's liner notes.

- Lead vocals – Kelly Clarkson
- Background vocals – Nicole Hurst, Bridget Sarai
- Saxophone (baritone, tenor) – Leon Silva
- Bass – Jesse Shatkin, Verdine White
- Drum programming, additional programming, synthesizer – Jesse Shatkin
- Drums – Jesse Shatkin, John Paris
- Engineers – Jesse Shatkin, Michael Harris
  - Additional engineer – Samuel Dent
  - Assistant engineer – Chris Cerullo, Todd Tidwell
- Flugelhorn – Sean Erick
- Guitar – Morris O'Connor, Srdjan Dimitrijevic
- Horns – Earth, Wind & Fire Horns Section, The Regiment Horns
- Horn orchestrator, leader, music preparation – Raymond Lee Brown
- Mixer – Serban Ghenea
- Mastering – Chris Gehringer
- Producers – Fade Majah, Jussifer, Nova Wav, Jesse Shatkin
- Production coordinator – JoAnn Tominaga
- Tenor Saxophone – Gary Bias
- Trombone – Reggie Young, Kevin Williams Jr.
- Tuba – Kevin Williams Jr.
- Trumpet – Bobby Burns, Sean Erick, Chuck Findley

== Charts ==
Chart (2018)	Peak position
US Digital Songs (Billboard)	142

== See also ==
- Media and gender § Body image
- Women in music
- Women's empowerment
