= Joey Jay (drag queen) =

American drag performer

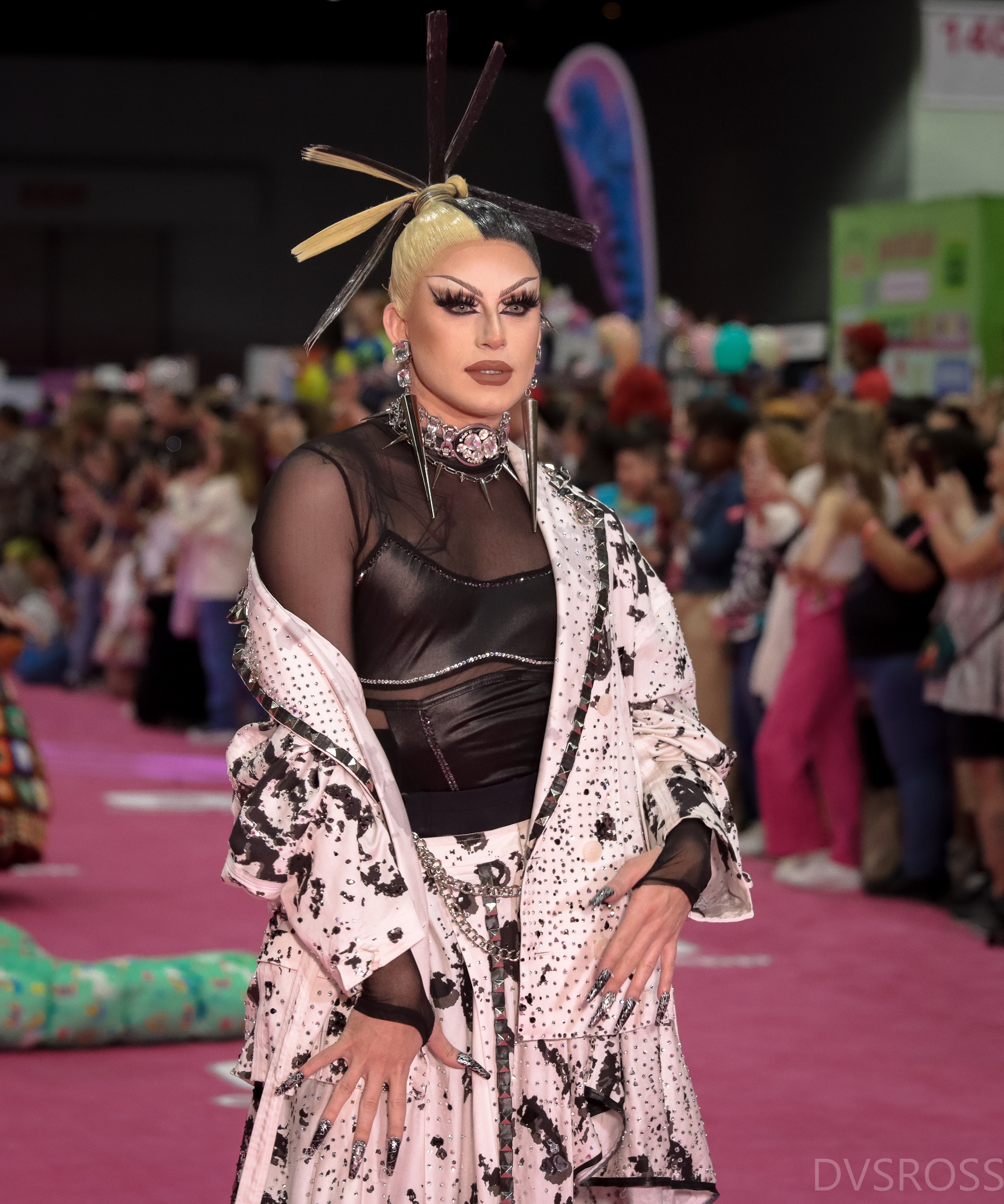
- Joey Jay at RuPaul's DragCon LA, 2023
- Born: Joseph Jadryev; 1990 (age 36); Madison, Wisconsin, U.S.
- Television: RuPaul's Drag Race (season 13)
- Website: joeyjayisgay.com

Joey Jay is the stage name of Joey Jadryev, an American drag performer most known for competing on season 13 of RuPaul's Drag Race and placing as runner-up on season 11 of RuPaul's Drag Race All Stars.

== Early life ==
Joey Jadryev was born in Madison, Wisconsin. He began performing in drag while living in Milwaukee, then moved to Phoenix, Arizona. His plan to open a ballroom dancing studio fell through due to injury.

== Career ==
Prior to pursuing drag, Jadryev worked as an account manager at a software company.

Joey Jay performs at Kobalt Bar in Phoenix, Arizona. She competed on season 13 of RuPaul's Drag Race. She was eliminated on the fifth episode after losing a lip-sync to "Fancy" (2014) by Iggy Azalea against LaLa Ri. In 2024, Joey Jay lobbied for LGBTQ+ rights alongside Jiggly Caliente and Brigitte Bandit at the United States Capitol. In drag pageantry, she was crowned Miss Gay Phoenix America 2025. In April 2026, Jay was announced to be competing on the eleventh season of RuPaul's Drag Race All Stars in the third bracket. She is the sole representative of Drag Race's thirteenth season.

== Personal life ==
Jadryev is gay, Jewish, and lived in Milwaukee before moving to Phoenix in 2017.

== Filmography ==
=== Television ===
- RuPaul's Drag Race (season 13)
- RuPaul's Drag Race All Stars (season 11), runner-up

== Discography ==
=== Singles ===
- 2026: You Better Dance You Homosexual
