= Elliott with 2 Ts =

American drag performer

- Born: Elliott Lee Puckett; July 30, 1993 (age 32); Ennis, Texas, U.S.
- Other name: Giselle Canavar
- Television: RuPaul's Drag Race (season 13)

Elliott with 2 Ts (born July 30, 1993) is the stage name of Elliott Lee Puckett, an American drag performer most known for competing on season 13 of RuPaul's Drag Race.

== Career ==
Elliott with 2 Ts competed on season 13 of RuPaul's Drag Race. On the season's premiere episode she, alongside Kahmora Hall, lost a lip-sync to "Lady Marmalade" against Tina Burner and was subsequently eliminated by her fellow contestants via a vote. However, she returned to the competition as part of the winners' group; upon the two groups reuniting she surprised the contestants who had chosen to eliminate her by hiding behind a wall. She impersonated Rue McClanahan during the Snatch Game challenge, which she was eliminated for after losing a lipsync to "Fascinated" by Company B against Utica Queen, ultimately placing ninth overall. Two episodes prior she eliminated LaLa Ri after winning a lipsync against her to Kelly Clarkson's "Whole Lotta Woman". At the season's reunion alongside the other eliminated queens, Elliott performed a pre-recorded lipsync number, which in her case was "Hideaway" by Kiesza.

== Controversy ==
Elliott attracted criticism in January 2021 for describing RuPaul's Drag Race season thirteen winner Symone's drag as "Black Girl Magic. That is what she brought... but she did it so elegantly. It wasn't aggressive, it was done with taste." Her remark was accused of being racially insensitive, drawing criticism from the likes of Jaida Essence Hall and Kandy Muse. In an interview with Entertainment Weekly Elliott clarified her comments, explaining that "what I meant by that was, in comparison to someone like Eureka O'Hara, Eureka's drag is larger than life with big shoulders and headpieces, really pageant, and over-the-top. Symone's drag is very fashion model and off-the-runway. I meant that her drag isn't the same loud, over-the-top drag as someone like Eureka... instead of hearing from me, everybody wants to run wild through the town, screaming from the rooftops that I'm this problematic, hateful person."

Allegations of transphobia were levelled towards her in September 2022 when fellow contestant Gottmik mentioned on No Gorge, a podcast he co-hosts with Violet Chachki, that a season thirteen contestant made openly transphobic remarks while filming the season, resulting in Gottmik reaching out to Drag Race's "Queen Care" therapy program for support, and who also referred to Symone's runway looks as "ghetto". Gottmik did not refer to the contestant by name, citing the show's non-disclosure agreement; Kandy Muse commented "it's Elliot [sic]" on a podcast clip on social media, prompting further fan criticism to come Elliott's way.

== Personal life ==
Elliott with 2 Ts (born Elliott Puckett) is originally from Ennis, Texas, having grown up on a farm. She left Texas in January 2018 and then moved to Las Vegas.

== Filmography ==
=== Television ===
- RuPaul's Drag Race (season 13)
- Hacks (season 3)
