= Kahmora Hall =

American drag performer (born 1991)

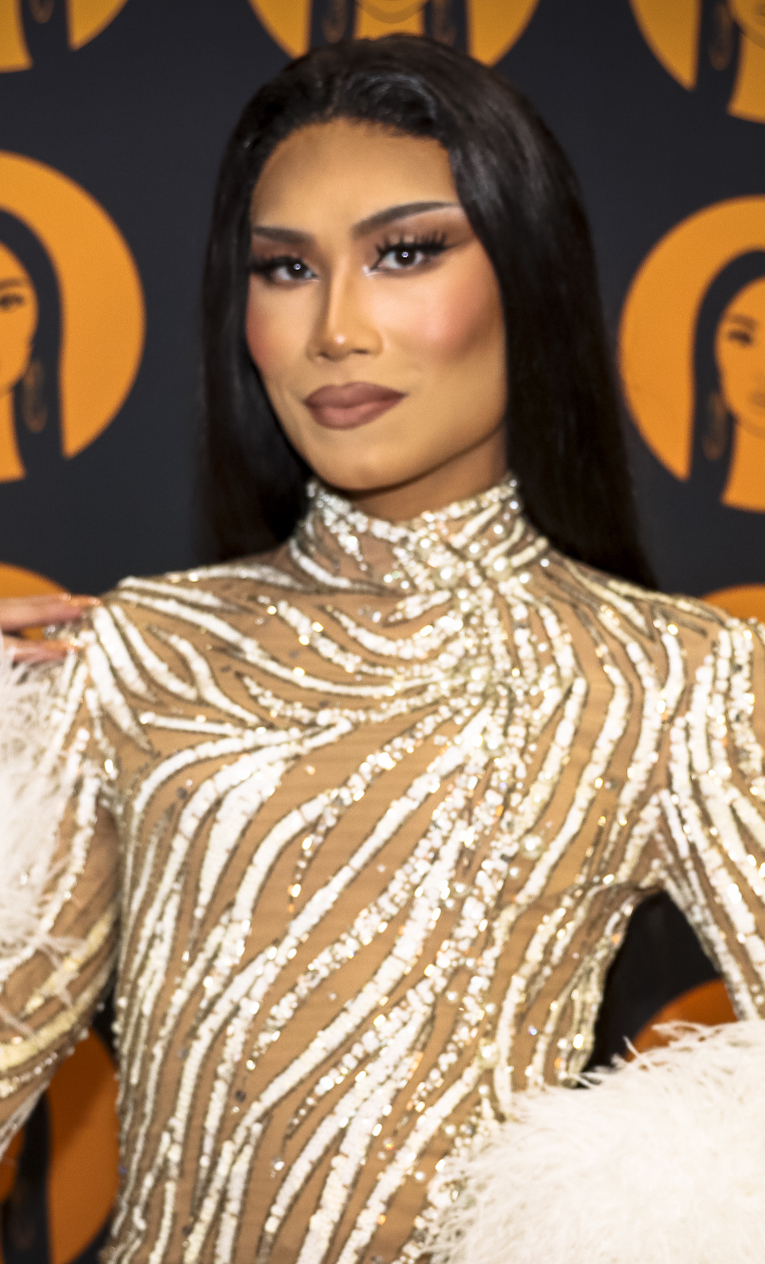
- Hall at RuPaul's DragCon LA, 2022
- Born: Paul Tran; September 13, 1991 (age 34); Chicago, Illinois, U.S.
- Other name: Yoko Tsunami
- Education: Loyola University Chicago (BA)
- Television: RuPaul's Drag Race (season 13)
- Website: kahmora.com

Kahmora Hall (born September 13, 1991) is the stage name of Paul Tran, a drag performer most known for competing on season 13 of RuPaul's Drag Race.

== Career ==
Kahmora Hall was the first contestant eliminated from season 13 of RuPaul's Drag Race. She wore an original Bob Mackie dress on the show. Michelle Kim of them magazine said her lip sync to "100% Pure Love" against Denali "will go down in Drag Race herstory". In 2022, Hall returned to the show as a special guest on an episode of season 14, along with season seven's Tempest DuJour and season nine's Jaymes Mansfield; the three queens had all been previously eliminated on the first episode of their respective seasons (“first-outs”), and were selected to return and partake in the fifth episode's main challenge.

In autumn 2022, Hall, along with fellow Drag Race alumni Ginger Minj (runner-up of season 7 and All Stars 6) and Kornbread "The Snack" Jeté (of season 14), starred in Hocus Pocus 2 as drag versions of the undead Sanderson Sisters, appearing with Bette Midler, Kathy Najimy and Sarah Jessica Parker.

== Personal life ==
Tran studied at Niles West High School and Loyola University and lives in Chicago. In 2021, he said he has experienced microaggressions in drag competitions due to anti-Asian racism. Tajma Hall is Kahmora Hall's "drag mother".

== Filmography ==
=== Television ===
Year	Title	Role	Notes	Ref
2021	RuPaul's Drag Race (season 13)	Herself	Contestant	
2021	RuPaul's Drag Race: Untucked	Herself	Contestant	
2021	RuPaul's Drag Race: Corona Can't Keep a Good Queen Down	Herself	Stand-alone special	
2022	RuPaul's Drag Race (season 14)	Herself	Guest appearance	

=== Film ===
Year	Title	Role	Notes	Ref
2022	Hocus Pocus 2	Drag Queen Sarah		
2024	Shimmer - Inspired by Eva Young	Drag Queen/Herself	Short film	

=== Web series ===
Year	Title	Role	Notes	Ref
2021	Meet the Queens	Herself	Stand-alone special RuPaul's Drag Race Season 13	
2021	Whatcha Packin'	Herself	Guest	
2021	Revealing the Look	Herself	Guest	
2021	Bootleg Opinions	Herself	Guest	
2022	EW News Flash	Herself	Guest with Ginger Minj and Kornbread Jeté	
2022	Out of the Closet	Herself	Guest	
2024	The Pit Stop	Herself	Guest	
