= Denali (drag queen) =

American drag performer, figure skater, and choreographer

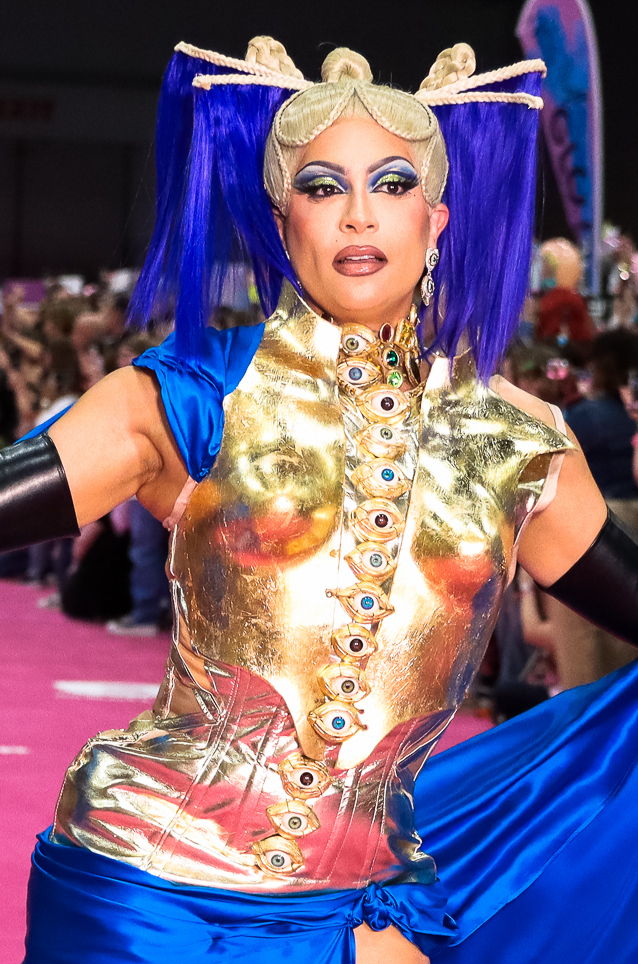
- Denali at RuPaul's DragCon LA, 2023
- Born: Cordero Matthew Zuckerman; April 1, 1992 (age 34); Fairbanks, Alaska, U.S.
- Other names: Denali Foxx; Tonya Hardon
- Education: University of Utah (BA)
- Television: RuPaul's Drag Race (season 13) and RuPaul's Drag Race All Stars (season 10)
- Spouse: Alexander Montgomery (m. 2026)
- Website: denaliqueen.com

Denali Foxx (or simply Denali) is the stage name of Cordero Matthew Zuckerman (born April 1, 1992), an American drag performer, figure skater, and choreographer best known for competing on the thirteenth season of RuPaul's Drag Race and the tenth season of RuPaul's Drag Race All Stars.

== Early life ==
Born to Jeffrey Alan Zuckerman and Jo Ann Hernandez on April 1, 1992, in Fairbanks, Alaska, Zuckerman was raised by parents of Mexican and Jewish descent. Zuckerman graduated from University of Utah in 2013 with a Bachelor of Arts degree in Spanish Language and Literature and a minor in comparative literature and Korean.

== Career ==
Zuckerman is a double gold medalist in the U.S. Figure Skating moves and freestyle category and a PSA certified coach. He has skated with Cirque du Soleil, SeaWorld, and Royal Caribbean Productions and choreographed for Team USA figure skaters Mariah Bell, Amber Glenn, and Ashley Cain-Gribble/Timothy LeDuc.

Denali competed on the thirteenth season of RuPaul's Drag Race. She was the first contestant from Alaska and the first to compete with ice skates. During the show, she eliminated Kahmora Hall from the competition by lip syncing to "100% Pure Love" by Crystal Waters, portrayed a Russian bot in "Social Media: The Unverified Rusical", and impersonated Jonathan Van Ness during Snatch Game. She was eliminated in the season's makeover challenge after a lip sync against Olivia Lux, finishing in 8th place.

On April 23, 2025, Denali was announced as one of eighteen former Drag Race contestants participating in the tenth season of RuPaul's Drag Race All Stars.

== Personal life ==
Zuckerman lives in Chicago, as of 2018. He has a third-degree black belt in martial arts.

On August 29, 2026, Zuckerman married longtime partner Alexander Montgomery in a ceremony in Chicago.

== Discography ==
Title	Year	Notes
"Phenomenon (Cast Version)"	2021	By RuPaul featuring the Cast of RuPaul's Drag Race, Season 13

== Filmography ==
=== Television ===
Year	Title	Role	Notes	Ref
2021	RuPaul's Drag Race	Herself (contestant)	Season 13 (8th Place)	
2021	RuPaul's Drag Race: Untucked	Herself (contestant)	Season 13 (8th Place)	
2021	RuPaul's Drag Race: Corona Can't Keep a Good Queen Down	Herself	Stand-alone special	
2025	RuPaul's Drag Race All Stars	Herself (contestant)	Season 10 (11th Place)	
2025	RuPaul's Drag Race All Stars: Untucked!	Herself (contestant)	Season 10 (11th Place)	
2025	2025 MTV Video Music Awards	Herself	Performer with Sabrina Carpenter, Willam, Laganja Estranja, Symone, and Lexi Love	

=== Web series ===
Year	Title	Role	Notes	Ref
2020	Meet the Queens	Herself	Stand-alone special	
2021	Ruvealing the Look	Herself	Guest	
2021	Whatcha Packin'	Herself	Guest	
2021	The X Change Rate	Herself	Guest	
2022	Out of the Closet	Herself	Guest	
2023	Give It to Me Straight	Herself	Guest	
2023	The Pit Stop	Herself	Guest	

=== Music videos ===
Song	Year	Ref
"When I Grow Up (Ice Version)"	2021	
"Shackles (Praise You)"	2021	
"Telepatía"	2021	
"Diva Duets"	2021	
"El Diablo"	2021	

== Awards and nominations ==
Year	Award-giving body	Category	Work	Results	Ref.
2022	The Queerties	Future All-Star	Herself	Won	

== See also ==
- List of people from Chicago
