= Utica Queen =

American drag performer (born 1995)

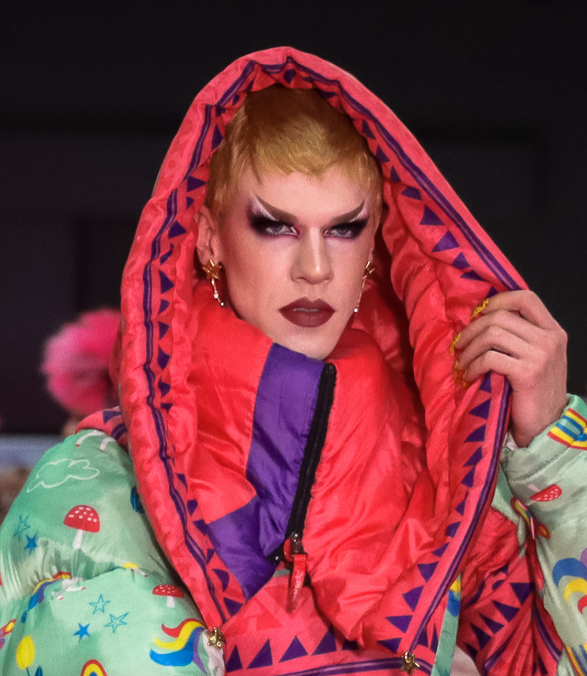
- Utica Queen at RuPaul's DragCon LA, 2023
- Born: Ethan David Mundt; June 2, 1995 (age 31); Olmsted County, Minnesota, U.S.
- Education: Hamline University (BA)
- Occupation: Drag queen
- Television: RuPaul's Drag Race (season 13); Project Runway (season 21)
- Website: uticaqueen.com

Ethan David Mundt (born June 2, 1995), known professionally as Utica Queen, is an American drag performer and fashion designer. He rose to prominence for competing on the thirteenth season of reality competition television series RuPaul's Drag Race and on the 21st season of Project Runway.

== Early life and education ==
Ethan David Mundt was born to Robert Duane and Susan Melinda Mundt on June 2, 1995, in Olmsted County, Minnesota. Growing up, he was raised in Utica and while attending St. Charles High School, Mundt joined a teenage improv troupe located at the Mayo Civic Center which involved him to cosplay and create outfits.

Mundt studied costume design and art at Hamline University, meanwhile he received help from older drag performers with his persona. Mundt later graduated in 2017 with a bachelor's degree in liberal arts and theatre production. He began performing under the name Utica Queen, after his hometown.

== Career and public image ==
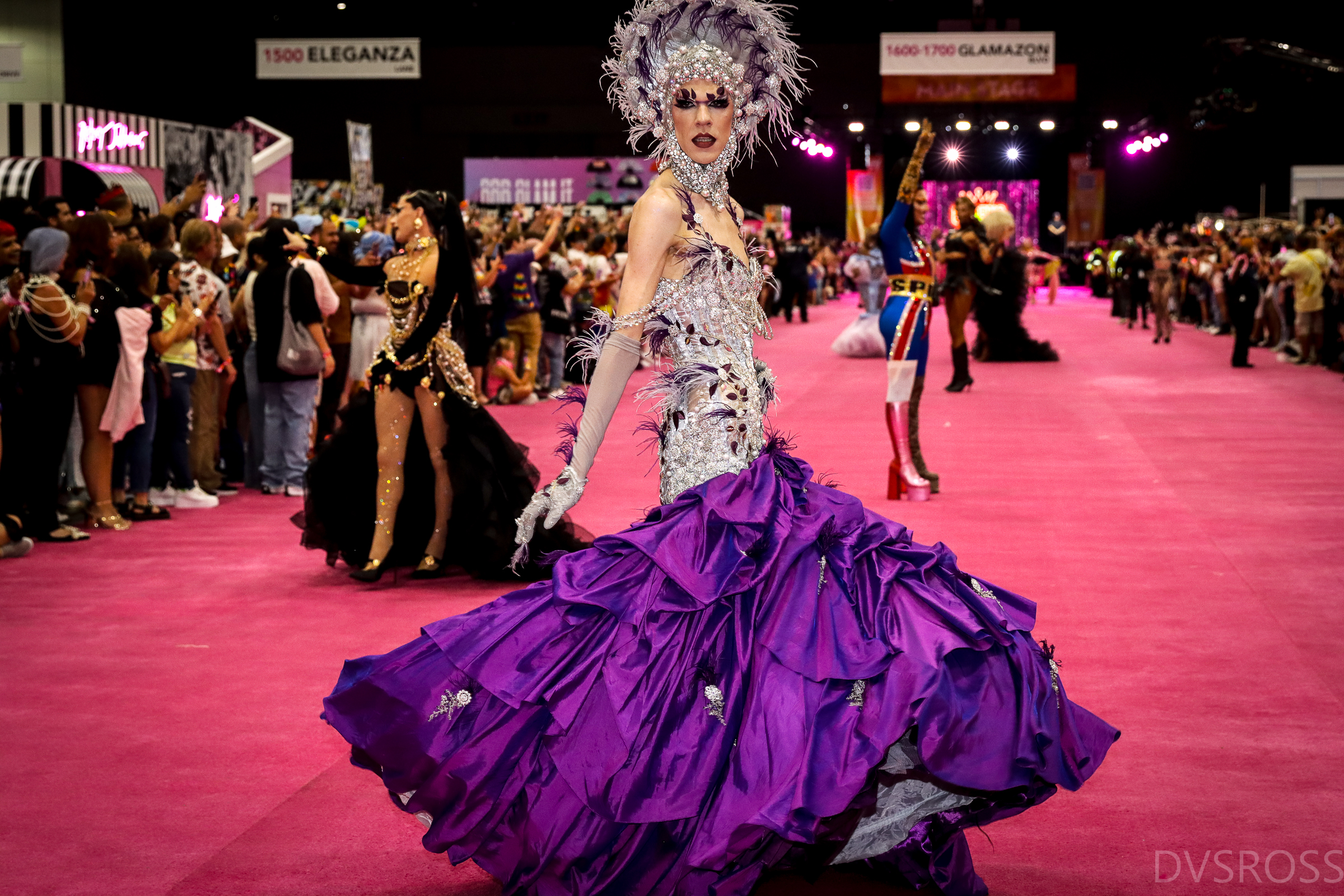
Utica Queen at RuPaul's DragCon LA, 2024

Utica Queen was announced to be competing in the thirteenth season of reality competition series RuPaul's Drag Race on December 9, 2020. She became the third contestant to represent Minneapolis after BeBe Zahara Benet, who competed and won in its first season, alongside Mercedes Iman Diamond competing in the eleventh season.

During the Snatch Game challenge, she impersonated painter Bob Ross which failed to impress the judges and was up for elimination against competitor Elliott with 2 Ts; she was declared safe in the lip-sync contest to "Fascinated" (1986) by freestyle trio Company B. Utica Queen was included in a Screen Rant article which ranked her seventh in 2023 for the "worst" impersonations to occur in the series. She eventually won the makeover challenge alongside contestant (and now winner) Symone, where they exchange their looks and garments. The drag performer then again fell short when she had to create and commercialize a soft drink. Utica Queen remained safe after lip-syncing "My Humps" (2005) by hip-hop group the Black Eyed Peas against contestant Tina Burner.

Overall, she was eliminated, finishing in sixth place during a comedy roasting challenge, where she was notoriously given the finger by host and head judge RuPaul. Utica Queen told entertainment news Vulture, "I literally felt like I could die happy, [...] I did the thing." Many fans soon blamed her for "fatphobia" against comedian Loni Love, and she later issued an apology through X (formerly Twitter), stating, "The jokes were in bad taste and my attempt at roast humor [...] making fun of people's size is not okay. I'm truly sorry."

The same year, Utica Queen opened her first art exhibition on December 5, titled Homecoming Queen at the Rochester Art Center. This featured approximately twenty garments she created alongside initial concepts and design sketches shown. It lasted for four months, closing until April 3, 2022. Given its success, it sparked various drag brunch events surrounding the city.

Mundt was announced as a competitor in the twenty-first season of Project Runway, which premiered on July 31, 2025. Mundt is the first drag queen from the Drag Race franchise to compete on the show. Mundt made it to the finale and placed joint runner-up alongside Jesus Estrada.

== Personal life ==
Mundt uses he/him pronouns while not performing in drag. He has lived in Minneapolis. Since late 2021, he has resided in Chicago. During his time on Drag Race, Mundt revealed he is a member of the Seventh-day Adventist Church.

== Filmography ==
=== Television ===
List of television credits, with selected details
Year	Title	Genre	Role	Notes	Ref.
2021	RuPaul's Drag Race	Competition	Contestant	6th place	
2021	RuPaul's Drag Race: Untucked	Competition	Contestant	6th place	
2025	Project Runway	Competition	Contestant	Runner-up	
