= Olivia Lux =

American drag performer (born 1994)

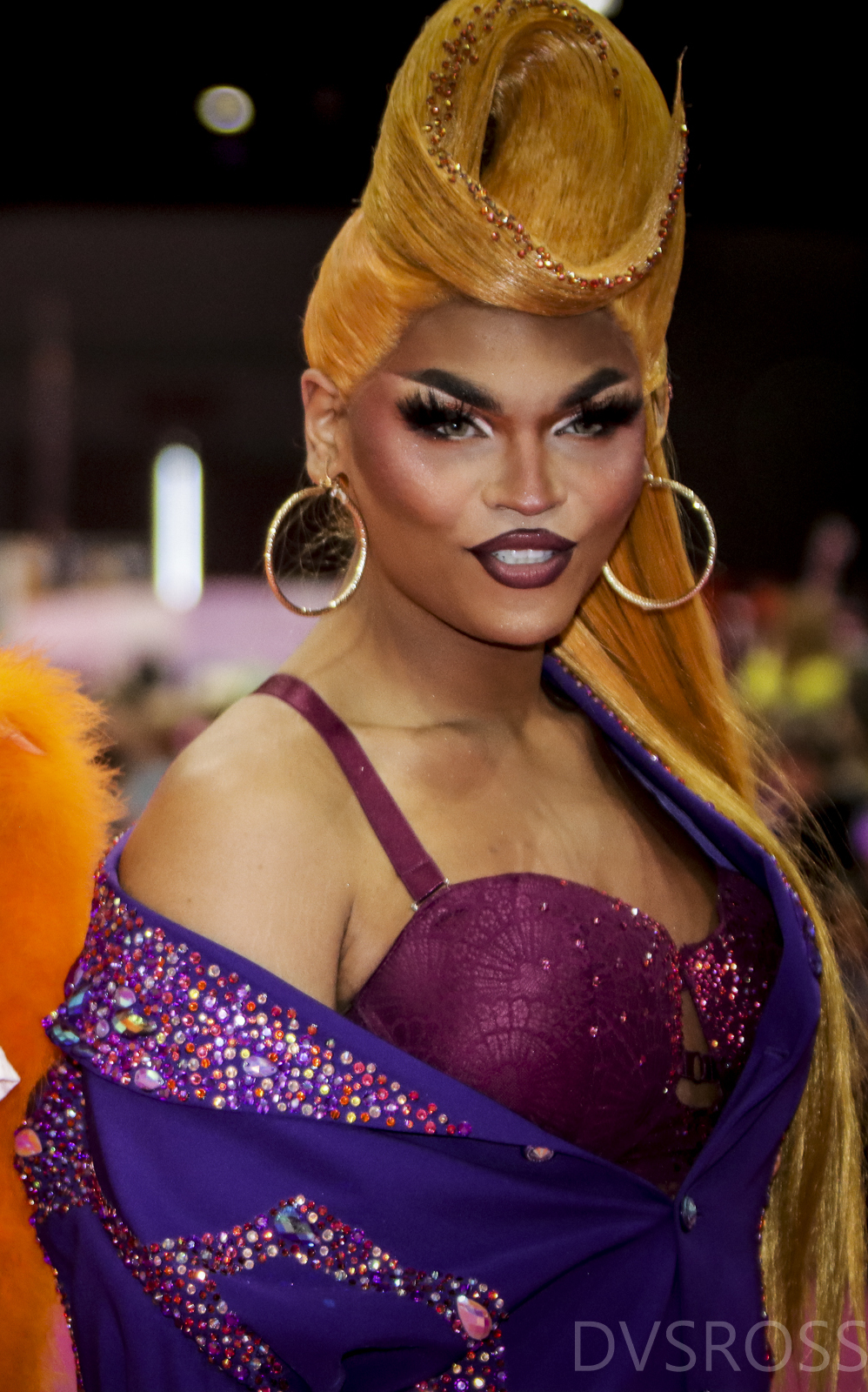
- Olivia Lux at RuPaul's DragCon LA, 2022
- Born: Fred Carlton Bunton; March 14, 1994 (age 32); Buena Vista Township, New Jersey, U.S.
- Other name: Liv Lux Miyake-Mugler
- Education: Montclair State University (BA)
- Television: RuPaul's Drag Race (season 13) and RuPaul's Drag Race All Stars (season 10)

Olivia Lux (born March 14, 1994) is the stage name of Fred Carlton Bunton, an American drag performer most known for competing on season 13 of RuPaul's Drag Race and season 10 of RuPaul's Drag Race All Stars. Olivia joined the House of Miyake-Mugler in November 2021 and in February 2022 announced that she would be changing her name to Liv Lux Miyake-Mugler when referred to in the ballroom scene.

== Career ==
Olivia grew up in Buena Vista Township and nearby Vineland, New Jersey. She graduated from Montclair State University. She moved to Bushwick, New York in 2018.

Olivia competed on season 13 of RuPaul's Drag Race. She placed in the top five, losing her spot in the finale after losing a lip-sync to Kandy Muse. On the second episode of the season, Olivia placed in the top, but lost the lip-sync for the win to Symone. In the sixth and seventh episodes of the season, Olivia won the main challenges, winning two cash prizes of $5,000. She became a member of the House of Miyake-Mugler who won season 2 of Legendary, and made her debut in the competitive ballroom scene in 2021. She was also cast in X-Mas X-Travaganza - Shantay You Sleigh in 2021.

In April 2023, Olivia announced on her Instagram and Twitter that she was cast as the role of Angel in Paper Mill Playhouse's production of Rent, running from June 7 to July 2, 2023.

On April 23, 2025, Olivia Lux was announced as one of eighteen former Drag Race contestants participating in the tenth season of RuPaul's Drag Race All Stars.

== Personal life ==
Originally from New Jersey, Olivia Lux lives in Brooklyn, as of 2023. She dances, sings, and writes music. Her original drag name came from Olivia Pope from Scandal, and the Latin word for light.

== Filmography ==
=== Television ===
Year	Title	Role	Notes	Ref
2021	RuPaul's Drag Race	Contestant	Season 13 - (5th Place)	
2021	RuPaul's Drag Race: Untucked	Contestant	Season 13	
2021	RuPaul's Drag Race: Corona Can't Keep a Good Queen Down	Herself	Stand-alone special	
2021	The Drew Barrymore Show	Herself	Guest (Episode: "Lee Daniels/Design by Drew: Tiny House Edition")	
2023	57th Annual CMT Music Awards	Herself	Performer with Kelsea Ballerini, Jan Sport, Manila Luzon & Kennedy Davenport	
2023	The Weakest Link	Herself	Contestant	
2023	Glam Slam	Herself	Contestant	
2025	RuPaul's Drag Race All Stars (season 10)	Herself (contestant)	Contestant - (11th Place	

=== Music videos ===
Year	Title	Artist	Ref
2022	"It's the Music"	Olivia Lux	
2022	"GAGA"	Grace Gaustad	

== See also ==
- LGBT culture in New York City
- List of LGBT people from New York City
