= LaLa Ri =

American drag performer and musician

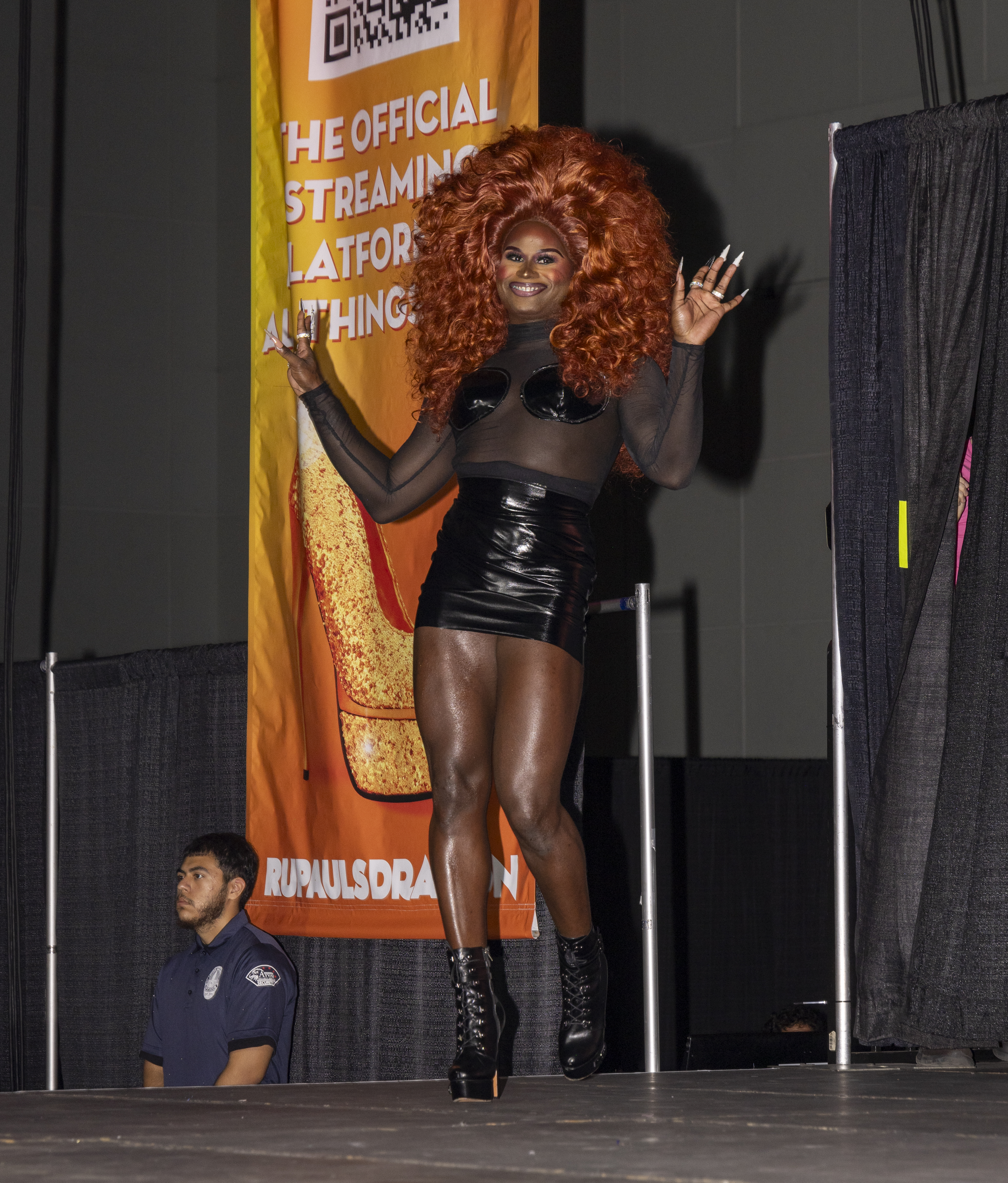
- LaLa Ri at RuPaul's DragCon LA, 2024
- Born: LaRico Demetrius Potts; August 28, 1990 (age 36); Atlanta, Georgia, U.S.
- Occupation: Drag queen
- Television: RuPaul's Drag Race (season 13) RuPaul's Drag Race All Stars (season 8)

LaLa Ri is the stage name of LaRico Demetrius Potts (born August 28, 1990), an American musician, drag performer, and real estate agent most known for competing on season 13 of RuPaul's Drag Race, season 8 of RuPaul's Drag Race All Stars, and the first season of Drag Race Down Under vs. the World.

== Career ==
Potts competed as LaLa Ri on the thirteenth season of RuPaul's Drag Race (2021). Prior to appearing on the show, Potts had worked as a professional drag queen for three years.

On Drag Race, LaLa Ri placed tenth overall and became the first contestant in the show's history to receive the "Golden Boot Award". At the finale, she was awarded the title of "Miss Congeniality" and took home a cash prize of $10,000. In 2021, she released the song "Bad Bitch Tip" and appeared on KLP's track "Eat the Runway". She also appears on Honey Davenport's EP Love Is God. LaLa Ri later returned to compete on the eighth season of RuPaul's Drag Race All Stars (2023). She placed fifth overall and was crowned "Queen of the Fame Games,” receiving a scepter and cash prize of $60,000.

Potts announced his retirement from drag in November 2024. However, he announced his return in March 2025. She competed on the first season of Drag Race Down Under vs. the World (2026), where she placed fifth.

In autumn 2026 Potts was announced to be working as a real estate agent in Atlanta with Common Ground Real Estate.

== Personal life ==
Potts is based in Atlanta. He lived in Shanghai, China for almost two years for dance.

== Discography ==
=== Singles ===
==== As featured artist ====
Title	Year	Album
"ConDragulations" (with the cast of RuPaul's Drag Race, season 13)	2021	Non-album single
"Money, Success, Fame, Glamour" (Glam Rock version) (with the cast of RuPaul's Drag Race All Stars, season 8)	2023	Non-album single
"Joan! The Unauthorized Rusical" (with the cast of RuPaul's Drag Race All Stars, season 8)	2023	Joan! The Unauthorized Rusical Album

== Filmography ==
=== Television ===
Year	Title	Role	Notes	Ref
2021	RuPaul's Drag Race (season 13)	Contestant	10th place, Miss Congeniality (8 episodes)	
2021	RuPaul's Drag Race: Untucked! (season 12)	Herself	6 episodes	
2021	RuPaul's Drag Race: Corona Can't Keep a Good Queen Down	Herself	Stand-alone special	
2022	RuPaul's Drag Race (season 14)	Herself	Guest (1 episode)	
2023	RuPaul's Drag Race All Stars (season 8)	Contestant	5th place, Winner of the Fame Games (10 episodes)	
2023	RuPaul's Drag Race All Stars: Untucked! (season 5)	Herself	8 episodes	
2026	Drag Race Down Under vs. the World	Contestant	5th place	

=== Web series ===
Year	Title	Notes	Ref.
2023	Meet the Queens	Stand-alone special RuPaul's Drag Race All Stars 8	
2023	EW News Flash	Guest	
2023	BuzzFeed Celeb	Guest	
2023	The Awardist	Guest	
2024	Binge Queens		

== Awards and nominations ==
Year	Award-giving body	Category	Results	Ref.
2022	The Queerties	Future All-Star	Nominated	
