= The Snatch Game (RuPaul's Drag Race season 2) =

- RuPaul's Drag Race episode
- Episode no.: Season 2 Episode 4
- Presented by: RuPaul

Guest appearances
- Niecy Nash (guest judge); Lisa Rinna (guest judge); Alec Mapa

Episode chronology
- RuPaul's Drag Race season 2

"The Snatch Game" is the fourth episode of the second season of the American television series RuPaul's Drag Race. It originally aired on February 22, 2010. The episode's main challenge tasks the contestants with impersonating celebrities in the Snatch Game. This was the first time contestants played the game.

Niecy Nash and Lisa Rinna are guest judges. Tatianna wins the main challenge. Sonique is eliminated from the competition after placing in the bottom and losing a lip-sync contest to "Two of Hearts" by Stacey Q.

== Episode ==
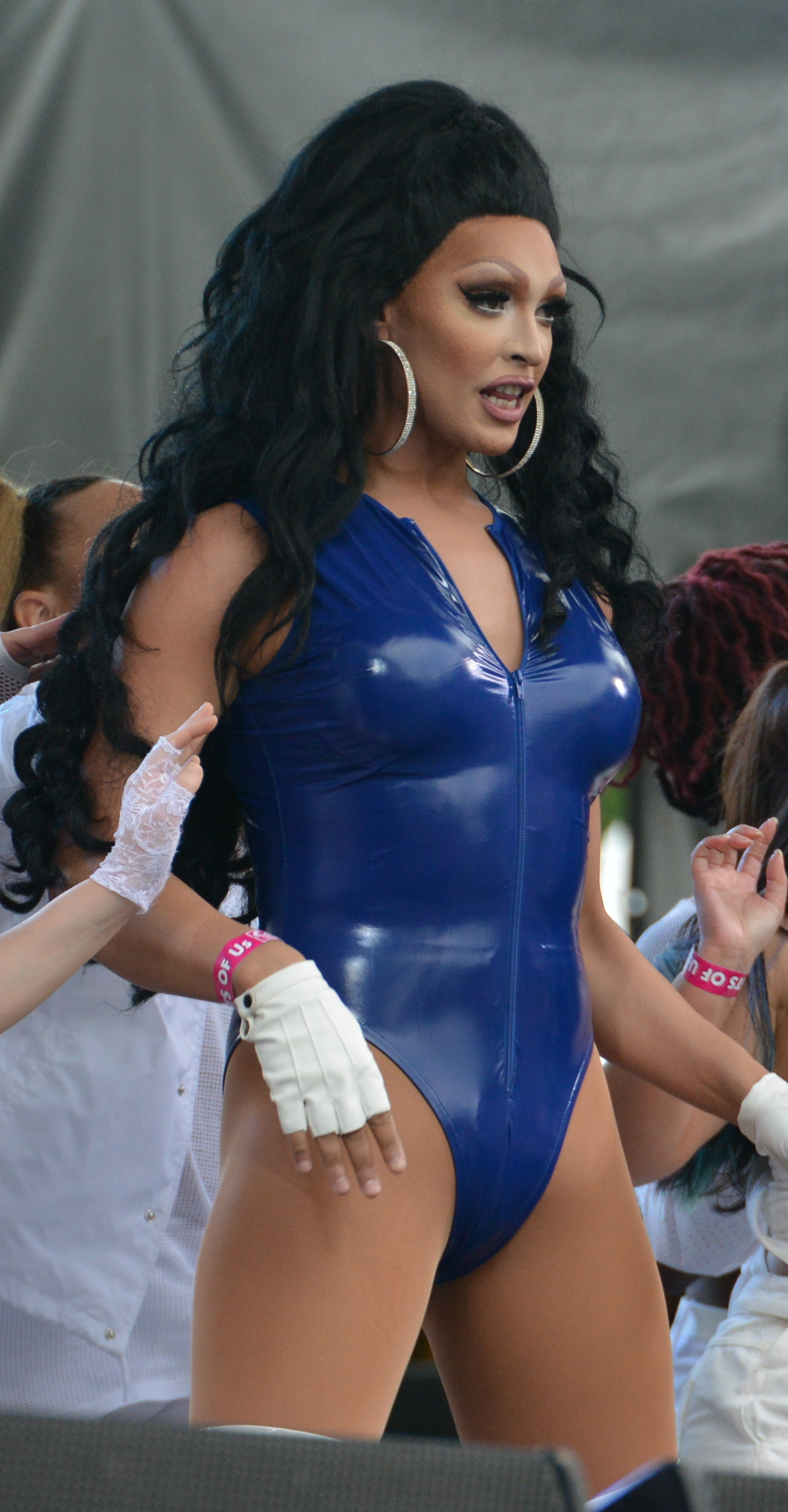
Tatianna (pictured in 2018) wins the episode's main challenge.

The contestants gather in the workroom. RuPaul greets the group and reveals the mini-challenge, which tasks the contestants with playing a game called "The Queen Is Right". The game has three rounds and requires the contestants to guess prices of products. Raven wins the mini-challenge, earning her a phone call to a family member.

RuPaul then reveals the main challenge, which tasks the contestants with impersonating celebrities in the Snatch Game. Raven calls her mother. The contestants start to prepare for the main challenge. RuPaul returns to the workroom to meet with each contestant, asking questions and offering advice. RuPaul leaves and the contestants make final preparations. The Snatch Game commences, with Alec Mapa and Phoebe Price as celebrity guests. Following are the contestants and impersonated celebrities:

- Jessica Wild as RuPaul
- Jujubee as Kimora Lee
- Morgan McMichaels as Pink
- Pandora Boxx as Carol Channing
- Raven as Paris Hilton
- Sahara Davenport as Whitney Houston
- Sonique as Lady Gaga
- Tatianna as Britney Spears
- Tyra Sanchez as Beyoncé

Back in the workroom, the contestants prepare for the fashion show. On the main stage, RuPaul welcomes fellow judges Michelle Visage and Santino Rice, as well as guest judges Niecy Nash and Lisa Rinna. RuPaul shares the assignment of the main challenge and the runway category ("personal style"), then the fashion show commences. After the contestants present their looks, the judges deliver their critiques, deliberate, then share the results with the contestants. Tatianna is declared the winner of the main challenge. Morgan McMichaels and Sonique place in the bottom and face off in a lip-sync contest to "Two of Hearts" (1986) by Stacey Q. Morgan McMichaels wins the lip-sync and Sonique is eliminated from the competition.

== Production and broadcast ==
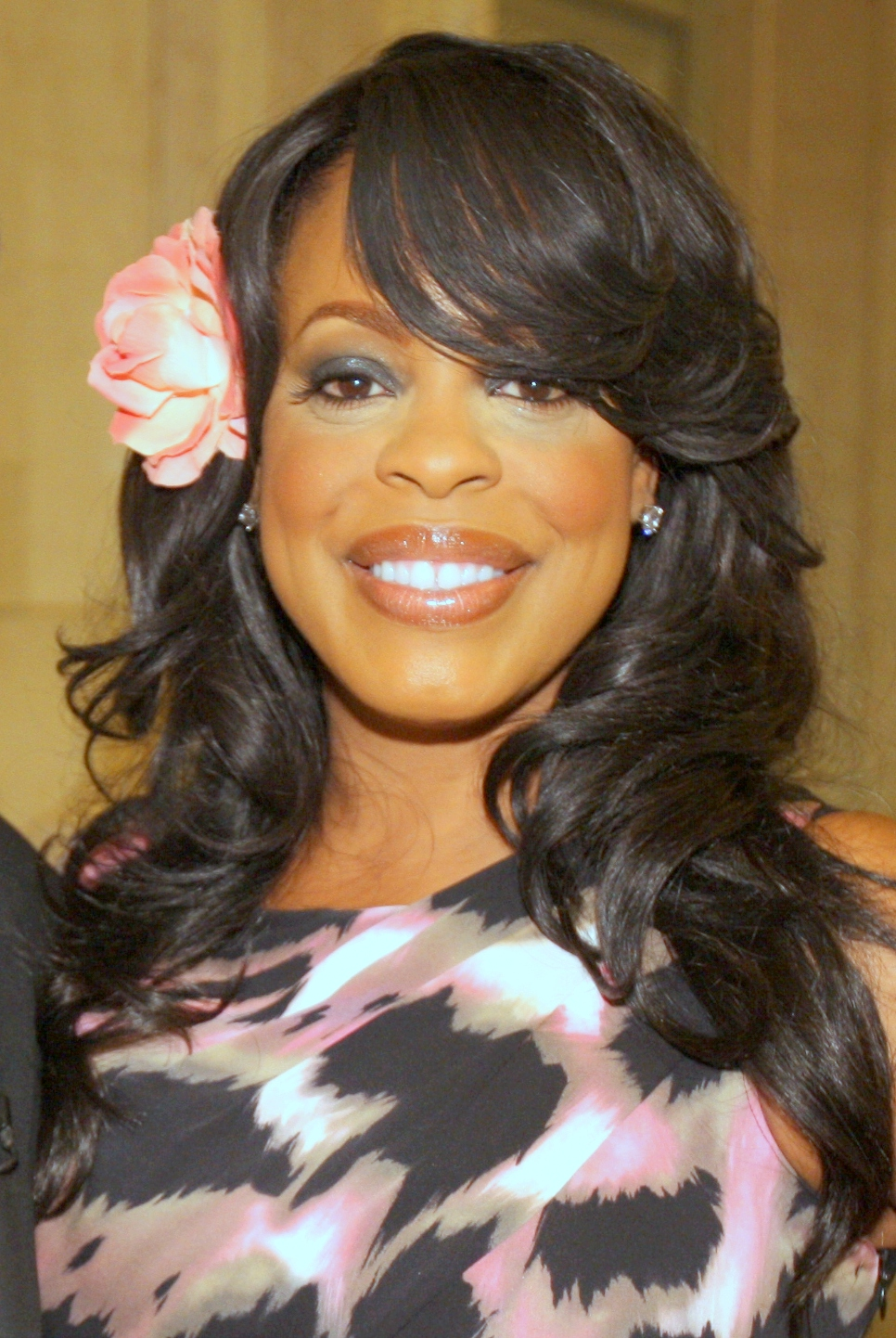
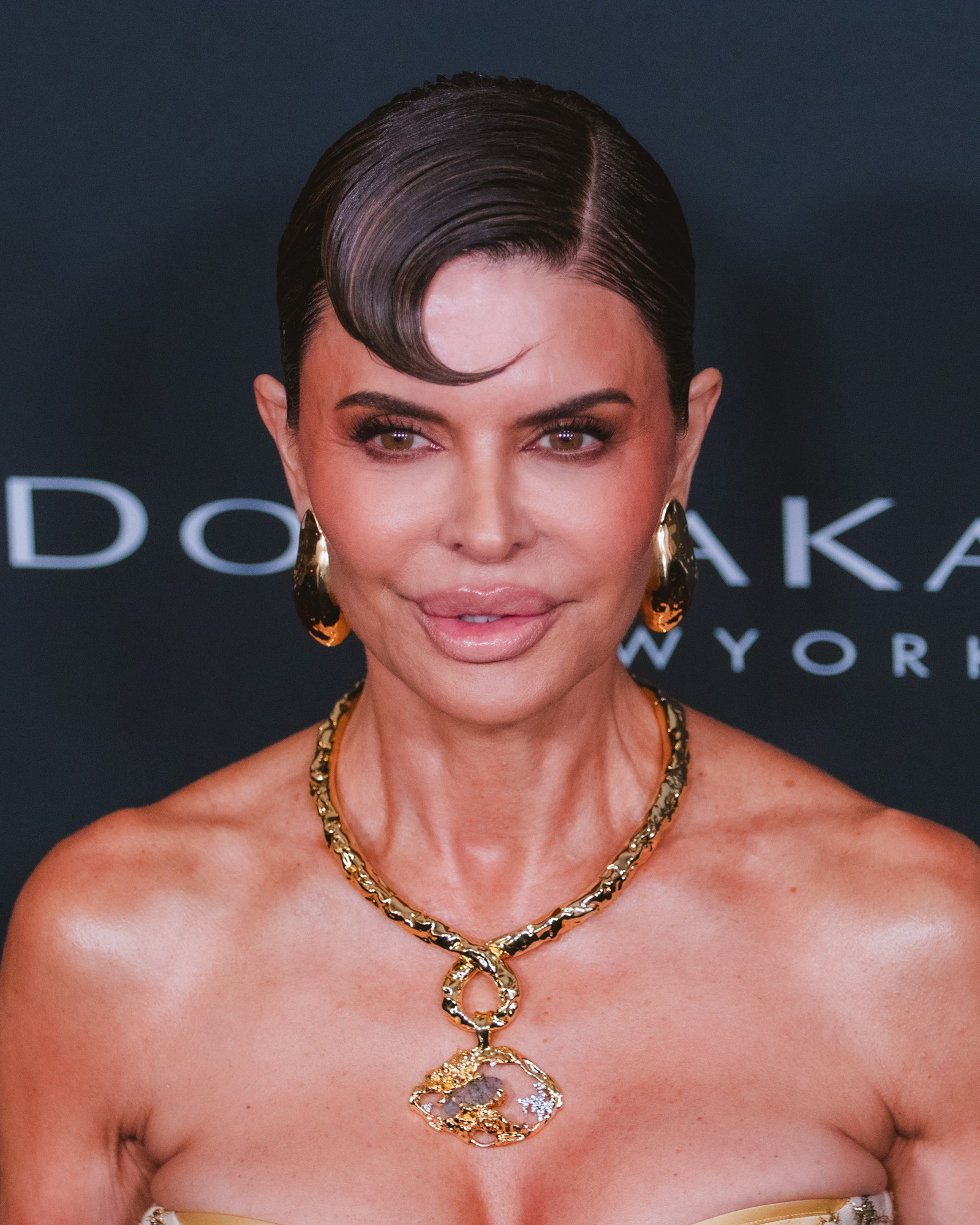
Niecy Nash (left, pictured in 2010) and Lisa Rinna (right, pictured in 2026) are guest judges.

The episode originally aired on February 22, 2010. It is the first episode to feature the Snatch Game. Writers for Gay Community News said Sonique performed "some impressive gymnastics across the stage" and Morgan McMichaels "gave one of the show's tightest lip-syncs".

=== Fashion ===
In the workroom, RuPaul wears a suit with an orange dress shirt. For the main stage, RuPaul has a colorful dress and a blonde wig with flower headpiece.

For the fashion show, Pandora Boxx wears a silver dress and a blonde wig. Tyra Sanchez has a red dress and a hat with long feathers. She carries shopping bags. Morgan McMichaels wears a circus-inspired black-and-gold outfit. Jujubee has a blue bodysuit and red high-heeled shoes. Sonique's outfit has an animal print and she wears an eye mask. Tatianna wears a short purple dress and a long wig. Jessica Wild has a black dress with a large blonde wig. Raven wears a dress with red ruffles and a black corset, as well as a short wig. Sahara Davenport has a black outfit and a short wig.

== Reception ==
E. Alex Jung gave the "Two of Hearts" performance honorable mention in Vulture's 2014 list of the show's ten best lip-sync contests. Stephen Daw ranked the performance number 14 in Billboard's 2018 list of the show's fifteen best lip-syncs. In 2021, Kayla Blanton of Bustle said Gottmik's impersonation of Hilton was "much stronger" than Raven's. In 2022, Daniel Villarreal of The Advocate said Sahara Davenport "shone" as Houston. Cailyn Szelinski included the "Two of Hearts" performance in Screen Rant's 2022 list of the ten "best lip syncs in any series, according to Reddit".

== See also ==
- Cultural impact of Beyoncé
- Cultural impact of Whitney Houston
