= RuPaul's Drag Race All Stars season 11 =

2026 season of RuPaul's Drag Race All Stars

RuPaul's Drag Race All Stars
- Season 11
- Hosted by: RuPaul
- Judges: RuPaul; Michelle Visage; Carson Kressley; Ross Mathews; Ts Madison; Law Roach; Jamal Sims
- No. of contestants: 18
- Winner: Crystal Methyd
- Runner-up: Joey Jay
- Companion show: All Stars: Untucked!
- No. of episodes: 12

Release
- Original network: Paramount+
- Original release: May 8 – July 17, 2026

Season chronology
- ← Previous; Season 10

The eleventh season of the American television series RuPaul's Drag Race All Stars premiered on Paramount+ on May 8, 2026. The season was announced during the finale of RuPaul's Drag Race season 18, while the season's contestants were announced on April 22, 2026. The season continues the same tournament format used in season 10. However, only two contestants from each bracket advanced to the semifinals instead of three, and the returning queen would return at the merge instead of the finale. The returning queen was Joey Jay, who placed as a runner up, losing to the winner of the season, Crystal Methyd.

== Contestants ==
RuPaul's Drag Race All Stars season 11 contestants and their backgrounds (Note: All ages, names, and cities are stated at time of filming.)
Bracket	Contestant	Age	Hometown	Original season(s)	Original placement(s)	Outcome
2	Crystal Methyd	35	Los Angeles, California	Season 12	Runner-up	Winner
3	Joey Jay	35	Phoenix, Arizona	Season 13	12th place	Runner-up (Note: Joey Jay placed eighth before re-entering the competition.)
3	Jasmine Kennedie	26	New York City, New York	Season 14	8th place	3rd place
2	Silky Nutmeg Ganache	35	Houston, Texas	Season 11	3rd place	3rd place
2	Silky Nutmeg Ganache	35	Houston, Texas	All Stars 6	11th place	3rd place
2	Silky Nutmeg Ganache	35	Houston, Texas	Canada vs. the World season 1	Runner-up	3rd place
1	A'keria C. Davenport (Note: A'keria Chanel Davenport is referred to as A'keria C. Davenport on the show.)	38	Dallas, Texas	Season 11	3rd place	5th place
1	A'keria C. Davenport	38	Dallas, Texas	All Stars 6	8th place	5th place
1	Dawn	28	New York City, New York	Season 16	6th place	5th place
3	Sam Star	26	Leeds, Alabama	Season 17	3rd place	7th place
3	Kennedy Davenport	43	Dallas, Texas	Season 7	4th place	8th place
3	Kennedy Davenport	43	Dallas, Texas	All Stars 3	Runner-up	8th place
3	Kennedy Davenport	43	Dallas, Texas	Canada vs. the World season 2	3rd place	8th place
2	April Carrión	37	Los Angeles, California	Season 6	11th place	9th place
2	Aura Mayari	35	Chicago, Illinois	Season 15	11th place	9th place
3	Hershii LiqCour-Jeté	35	Los Angeles, California	Season 16	14th place	9th place
1	Lucky Starzzz	28	Miami, Florida	Season 17	14th place	9th place
1	Morgan McMichaels	44	Los Angeles, California	Season 2	8th place	9th place
1	Morgan McMichaels	44	Los Angeles, California	All Stars 3	5th place	9th place
1	Morphine Love Dion	29	Miami, Florida	Season 16	5th place	9th place
1	Mystique Summers (Note: Mystique Summers was referred to as Mystique Summers Madison on season 2.)	42	Fort Worth, Texas	Season 2	10th place	9th place
2	Salina EsTitties	35	Los Angeles, California	Season 15	6th place	9th place
3	Shuga Cain	48	New York City, New York	Season 11	7th place	9th place
2	Vivacious	52	New York City, New York	Season 6	12th place	9th place

== Contestant progress ==
Legend:

Crystal Methyd won RuPaul's Drag Race All Stars season 11.
Joey Jay was the runner-up.
Joey Jay was chosen as the Comeback Queen (CBQ) from the Wildcard Lottery.
WIN indicates that the contestant won both the challenge and the Lip Sync for Your Legacy, receiving three points.
TOP2 indicates that the contestant won the challenge, but lost the Lip Sync for Your Legacy, receiving two points.
The contestant collected enough points to advance to the semifinals.
ADV indicates that the contestant won one of the Lip Sync Smackdown for the Crown lip syncs and advanced to the next round.
BYE indicates that the contestant received a bye in the first round of the Lip Sync Smackdown for the Crown and advanced directly to the second round.
SAFE indicates that the contestant was declared safe by the judges.
MVQ (Most Valuable Queen) indicates that the contestant was in the bottom and participated in the “Most Valuable Queen” points distribution.
BTM (Bottom) indicates that the contestant was up for elimination.
The contestant was eliminated.
LOSS indicates that the contestant was eligible for the Comeback Queen draw, but was not selected to return.
The contestant was seeded in Bracket 1.
The contestant was seeded in Bracket 2.
The contestant was seeded in Bracket 3.

Contestants progress with placements in each episode
Contestant	Episode									Points (Note: The points count and the following outcome for the queens was decided on each bracket's final episode.)	Episode					
Contestant	Bracket 1			Bracket 2			Bracket 3			Points	Semifinals			Finale		
Contestant	1	2	3	4	5	6	7	8	9	Points	10 (Note: At the end of Bracket 3, RuPaul and Michelle chose three eliminated contestants (Morgan, Salina and Joey) from each of the brackets to be entered in a "Comeback Queen" draw. The contestant randomly chosen out of the three was Joey Jay, who returned to the competition in the semifinals.)		11	12		
Crystal Methyd				WIN	TOP2	MVQ				6		WIN	WIN	BYE	ADV	Winner
Joey Jay							MVQ	MVQ	MVQ	2	CBQ	SAFE	SAFE	ADV	ADV	Runner-up
Jasmine Kennedie							TOP2	MVQ	MVQ	6		SAFE	SAFE	BYE	ELIM	
Silky Nutmeg Ganache				MVQ	WIN	MVQ				6		SAFE	SAFE	ADV	ELIM	
A'keria C. Davenport	MVQ	WIN	MVQ							7		BTM	BTM	ELIM		
Dawn	TOP2	TOP2	WIN							8		SAFE	SAFE	ELIM		
Sam Star							WIN	MVQ	TOP2	6		SAFE	ELIM			
Kennedy Davenport							MVQ	WIN	WIN	7		ELIM				
Hershii LiqCour-Jeté							MVQ	TOP2	MVQ	4	LOSS					
Shuga Cain							MVQ	MVQ	MVQ	2	LOSS					
April Carrión				MVQ	MVQ	MVQ				3	LOSS					
Aura Mayari				TOP2	MVQ	MVQ				3	LOSS					
Salina EsTitties				MVQ	MVQ	WIN				5	LOSS					
Vivacious				MVQ	MVQ	TOP2				4	LOSS					
Lucky Starzzz	MVQ	MVQ	MVQ							2	LOSS					
Morgan McMichaels	WIN	MVQ	TOP2							7	LOSS					
Morphine Love Dion	MVQ	MVQ	MVQ							2	LOSS					
Mystique Summers	MVQ	MVQ	MVQ							1	LOSS					

== Lip syncs ==
Legend:

The contestant won the Lip Sync for Your Legacy.
The contestant was eliminated after their second time in the bottom.
The contestant lost the first round of the Lip Sync Smackdown for the Crown and did not advance to the next round.
The contestant lost the second round of the Lip Sync Smackdown for the Crown and did not advance to the final round.
The contestant won the final round of the Lip Sync Smackdown for the Crown and was declared the winner of the season.

Episode	Top All Stars			Song	Winner
1	Dawn	vs.	Morgan McMichaels	"Such a Wicked Love" (La Toya Jackson)	Morgan McMichaels
2	A'keria C. Davenport	vs.	Dawn	"Fergalicious" (Fergie ft. will.i.am)	A'keria C. Davenport
3	Dawn	vs.	Morgan McMichaels	"Zombieboy" (Lady Gaga)	Dawn
4	Aura Mayari	vs.	Crystal Methyd	"No More Tears (Enough Is Enough)" (Barbra Streisand, Donna Summer)	Crystal Methyd
5	Crystal Methyd	vs.	Silky Nutmeg Ganache	"Hazy Shade of Winter" (The Bangles)	Silky Nutmeg Ganache
6	Salina EsTitties	vs.	Vivacious	"Super Bass" (Nicki Minaj)	Salina EsTitties
7	Jasmine Kennedie	vs.	Sam Star	"If You Were a Woman (And I Was a Man)" (Bonnie Tyler)	Sam Star
8	Hershii LiqCour-Jeté	vs.	Kennedy Davenport	"The Ladies Who Lunch" (Elaine Stritch)	Kennedy Davenport
9	Kennedy Davenport	vs.	Sam Star	"Breakin' Dishes" (Rihanna)	Kennedy Davenport
Episode	Bottom All Stars			Song	Eliminated
10	A'keria C. Davenport	vs.	Kennedy Davenport	"Nobody's Supposed to Be Here (Hex Hector Dance Mix)" (Deborah Cox)	Kennedy Davenport
11	A'keria C. Davenport	vs.	Sam Star	"Run the World (Girls)" (Beyoncé)	Sam Star
Episode	Contestants			Song	Eliminated
12	Dawn	vs.	Silky Nutmeg Ganache	"Star Love" (Cheryl Lynn)	Dawn
12	A'keria C. Davenport	vs.	Joey Jay	"The Boss" (Diana Ross)	A'keria C. Davenport
12	Joey Jay	vs.	Silky Nutmeg Ganache	"The Main Event/Fight" (Barbra Streisand)	Silky Nutmeg Ganache
12	Crystal Methyd	vs.	Jasmine Kennedie	"Knock on Wood" (Amii Stewart)	Jasmine Kennedie
12	Top Two All Stars			Song	Winner
12	Crystal Methyd	vs.	Joey Jay	"MacArthur Park" (Donna Summer)	Crystal Methyd

== Points ==
Legend:

The Top All Star won the Lip Sync for Your Legacy.
The Top All Star lost the Lip Sync for Your Legacy.
The contestant was in the bottom.
The contestant was eliminated.
The contestant won the Lip Sync for Your Legacy, and was eliminated in the same episode.
The contestant lost the Lip Sync for Your Legacy, and was eliminated in the same episode.

Summary of weekly points and results
Contestant	Episode								
Contestant	1	2	3	4	5	6	7	8	9
Dawn	2	4	8						
A'keria	1	6	7						
Morgan	3	3	7						
Lucky	1	2	2						
Morphine	1	2	2						
Mystique	1	1	1						
Crystal				3	5	6			
Silky				1	4	6			
Salina				1	2	5			
Vivacious				1	2	4			
April				1	2	3			
Aura				2	3	3			
Kennedy							1	4	7
Sam							3	4	6
Jasmine							2	3	6
Hershii							1	3	4
Joey							1	2	2
Shuga							1	2	2

=== Points per bracket ===
The Top All Star won the Lip Sync for Your Legacy.
The Top All Star lost the Lip Sync for Your Legacy.
The contestant was in the bottom.
ADV indicates that the contestant advanced to the semifinals.
ELIM indicates that the contestant was eliminated.

Weekly points and results in detail
Bracket 1
Contestant	Episode (Note: Including the MVQ ceremony associated with the episode even if shown at the start of the following episode.)			Final Points	Result
Contestant	1	2	3	Final Points	Result
A'keria	+1 (Morphine)	+5 (WIN, Morgan, Mystique)	+1 (Mystique)	7	ADV (Note: Because A'keria and Morgan were tied in points, RuPaul's decision was used to break the tie. RuPaul chose A'keria to advance to the semifinals.)
Dawn	+2 (TOP2)	+2 (TOP2)	+4 (WIN, Morphine)	8	ADV
Lucky	+1 (Mystique)	+1 (Morphine)	—	2	ELIM
Morgan	+3 (WIN)	—	+4 (TOP2, A'keria, Lucky)	7	ELIM
Morphine	+1 (A'keria)	+1 (Lucky)	—	2	ELIM
Mystique	+1 (Lucky)	—	—	1	ELIM
Bracket 2
Contestant	Episode			Final Points	Result
Contestant	4	5	6	Final Points	Result
April	+1 (Salina)	+1 (Salina)	+1 (Silky)	3	ELIM
Aura	+2 (TOP2)	+1 (Vivacious)	—	3	ELIM
Crystal	+3 (WIN)	+2 (TOP2)	+1 (April)	6	ADV
Salina	+1 (April)	+1 (April)	+3 (WIN)	5	ELIM
Silky	+1 (Vivacious)	+3 (WIN)	+2 (Aura, Crystal)	6	ADV
Vivacious	+1 (Silky)	+1 (Aura)	+2 (TOP2)	4	ELIM
Bracket 3
Contestant	Episode			Final Points	Result
Contestant	7	8	9	Final Points	Result
Hershii	+1 (Joey)	+2 (TOP2)	+1 (Jasmine)	4	ELIM
Jasmine	+2 (TOP2)	+1 (Joey)	+3 (Hershii, Joey, Shuga)	6	ADV (Note: Because Jasmine and Sam were tied in points, RuPaul's decision was used to break the tie. RuPaul chose both of Jasmine and Sam to advance to the semifinals.)
Joey	+1 (Hershii)	+1 (Jasmine)	—	2	ELIM
Kennedy	+1 (Shuga)	+3 (WIN)	+3 (WIN)	7	ADV
Sam	+3 (WIN)	+1 (Shuga)	+2 (TOP2)	6	ADV
Shuga	+1 (Kennedy)	+1 (Sam)	—	2	ELIM

== Guest judges ==
On April 29, the celebrity guest judges for this season were revealed.

- La Toya Jackson, American singer and actor
- Kate Hudson, American actress
- Christina Ricci, American actress
- Reneé Rapp, American singer-songwriter and actress
- Gina Gershon, American actress and singer
- Janelle James, American comedian, actress, and writer
- Juno Temple, British actress
- Brian Tyree Henry, American actor
- Bronwyn Newport, American television personality
- Evan Mulrooney, American actor and comedian
- Cooper Koch, American actor

=== Special guests ===
Guests who appeared in episodes, but did not judge on the main stage.

Episode 2

- Raven, runner-up on both RuPaul's Drag Race Season 2 and All Stars 1

Episode 4

- Markaholic, music producer

Episode 12

- Norvina, president of Anastasia Beverly Hills
- Evan Mulrooney, American actor and comedian

== Episodes ==
No. overall	No. in season	Title	Original release date
102	1	"Break Dancin' 2: Electric Rugaloo"	May 8, 2026
First bracket of queens enters the main stage. For this week's main challenge, the queens write and perform original verses to the song "Break Dancin' 2: Electric Rugaloo". On the runway, the category is "La Toya's R Us". After critiques, the judges highlight Dawn, Morgan McMichaels, and Morphine Love Dion, naming Dawn and Morgan McMichaels the Top 2 queens of the week. They lip-sync to "Such a Wicked Love" by La Toya Jackson. Morgan McMichaels wins the lip-sync and receives the prize.: Guest Judge: La Toya Jackson; Alternative Judge: Law Roach; Main Challenge: Write, record, and perform verses to "Break Dancin' 2: Electric Rugaloo"; Runway Theme: La Toya's R Us; Challenge Winners: Dawn and Morgan McMichaels; Points Awarded: 2 to Dawn and 2 to Morgan McMichaels; Lip-Sync Song: "Such a Wicked Love" by La Toya Jackson; Lip-Sync for Your Legacy Winner: Morgan McMichaels; Morgan McMichaels receives $10,000, an extra point and tickets to Stop! That! Train!
103	2	"Bar Queen Couture"	May 8, 2026
The four bottom queens enter the Werk Room and discuss how they will give the points to each other: A'keria C. Davenport gives her point to Morphine Love Dion.; Lucky Starzzz gives her point to Mystique Summers.; Morphine Love Dion gives her point to A'keria C. Davenport.; Mystique Summers gives her point to Lucky Starzzz.; For this week's main challenge, the queens need to design an outfit using materials inspired by different themed gay bars: A'keria C. Davenport: White Party; Dawn: Piano Bar; Lucky Starzzz: Kitschy Bar; Morgan McMichaels: Leather Bar; Morphine Love Dion: Tropical Bar; Mystique Summers: Country Western Bar; On the runway, the category is "Bar Queen Couture". After critiques, the judges highlight A'keria C. Davenport, Dawn, and Lucky Starzzz, naming A'keria C. Davenport and Dawn the Top 2 queens of the week. They lip-sync to "Fergalicious" by Fergie ft. will.i.am. A'keria C. Davenport wins the lip-sync and receives the prize.: Guest Judge: Kate Hudson; Alternative Judge: Carson Kressley; Mini-Challenge: Put on a pair of oversized underwear without using your hands; Mini-Challenge Winner: None; Mini-Challenge Prize: $500 cash tip (Even though no one won the mini-challenge, RuPaul awarded each queen with $500); Main Challenge: Create an outfit using materials inspired by gay bars; Runway Theme: Bar Queen Couture; Challenge Winners: A'keria C. Davenport and Dawn; Points Awarded: 2 to A'keria C. Davenport and 2 to Dawn; Lip-Sync Song: "Fergalicious" by Fergie ft. will.i.am; Lip-Sync for Your Legacy Winner: A'keria C. Davenport; A'keria C. Davenport receives $10,000 and an extra point
104	3	"Shop Til U Drop"	May 15, 2026
The four bottom queens enter the Werk Room and discuss how they will give the points to each other: Lucky Starzzz gives her point to Morphine Love Dion.; Morgan McMichaels gives her point to A'keria C. Davenport.; Morphine Love Dion gives her point to Lucky Starzzz.; Mystique Summers gives her point to A'keria C. Davenport.; For this week's main challenge, the queens must work in pairs and host a live shopping show on the "Home Spooky Network" while portrays different mythical creatures. The pairs and roles are: Dawn is Werewolf & Morphine Love Dion is Zombie.; Lucky Starzzz is Vampire & Mystique Summers is Frankenstein's Monster.; A'keria C. Davenport is Mummy & Morgan McMichaels is Ghost.; On the runway, the category is "Paris, France". After critiques, the judges discuss all of the queens, ultimately naming Dawn and Morgan McMichaels the Top 2 queens of the week. They lip-sync to "Zombieboy" by Lady Gaga. Dawn wins the lip-sync and receives the prize. After the lip-sync, the bottom queens award their final MVQ points on the main stage.: A'keria C. Davenport gives her point to Morgan McMichaels.; Lucky Starzzz gives her point to Morgan McMichaels.; Morphine Love Dion gives her point to Dawn.; Mystique Summers gives her point to A'keria C. Davenport.; With the most points, Dawn advance from the first bracket to the semi-finals. Since A'keria C. Davenport and Morgan McMichaels were tied in points, RuPaul then explains if queens were tied in points, the decision of the advancing queen would be on RuPaul. RuPaul then chose A'keria C. Davenport. Lucky Starzzz, Morgan McMichaels, Morphine Love Dion, and Mystique Summers are eliminated. RuPaul also reveals that one eliminated queen will re-enter the competition at the semi-finals.: Guest Judge: Christina Ricci; Alternative Judge: Ts Madison; Main Challenge: In pairs, host a live shopping show on the "Home Spooky Network"; Runway Theme: Paris, France; Challenge Winners: Dawn and Morgan McMichaels; Points Awarded: 2 to Dawn and 2 to Morgan McMichaels; Lip-Sync Song: "Zombieboy" by Lady Gaga; Lip-Sync for Your Legacy Winner: Dawn; Dawn receives $10,000 and an extra point; Advancing to Semi-Finals: A'keria C. Davenport and Dawn; Eliminated: Lucky Starzzz, Morgan McMichaels, Morphine Love Dion and Mystique Summers
105	4	"Duets: It Takes Two"	May 22, 2026
Second bracket of queens enters the main stage. For this week's main challenge, the queens must work in pairs and write, record, and perform duets. The pairs are: Silky Nutmeg Ganache & Vivacious performs "H.B.F".; April Carrión & Salina EsTitties performs "Dreamin' Of Me".; Aura Mayari & Crystal Methyd performs "Hoes Before Bros".; On the runway, the category is "You Butter Ask Somebody". After critiques, the judges discuss all of the queens, ultimately naming Aura Mayari and Crystal Methyd the Top 2 queens of the week. They lip-sync to "No More Tears (Enough Is Enough)" by Barbra Streisand and Donna Summer. Crystal Methyd wins the lip-sync and receives the prize.: Guest Judge: Reneé Rapp; Alternative Judge: Jamal Sims; Main Challenge: In pairs, write, record, and perform duets; Runway Theme: You Butter Ask Somebody; Challenge Winners: Aura Mayari and Crystal Methyd; Points Awarded: 2 to Aura Mayari and 2 to Crystal Methyd; Lip-Sync Song: "No More Tears (Enough Is Enough)" by Barbra Streisand and Donna Summer; Lip-Sync for Your Legacy Winner: Crystal Methyd; Crystal Methyd receives $10,000, an extra point and tickets to Stop! That! Train!
106	5	"How-To Videos"	May 29, 2026
The four bottom queens enter the Werk Room and discuss how they will give the points to each other: April Carrión gives her point to Salina EsTitties.; Salina EsTitties gives her point to April Carrión.; Silky Nutmeg Ganache gives her point to Vivacious.; Vivacious gives her point to Silky Nutmeg Ganache.; For this week's main challenge, the queens need to create, direct, and shoot their own short informational video on a topic of their choice. On the runway, the category is "Barn Your Way". After critiques, the judges highlight Crystal Methyd, Salina EsTitties, and Silky Nutmeg Ganache, naming Crystal Methyd and Silky Nutmeg Ganache the Top 2 queens of the week. They lip-sync to "Hazy Shade of Winter" by The Bangles. Silky Nutmeg Ganache wins the lip-sync and receives the prize.: Guest Judge: Gina Gershon; Alternative Judge: Carson Kressley; Main Challenge: Create your own informational video on a topic of your choice; Runway Theme: Barn Your Way; Challenge Winners: Crystal Methyd and Silky Nutmeg Ganache; Points Awarded: 2 to Crystal Methyd and 2 to Silky Nutmeg Ganache; Lip-Sync Song: "Hazy Shade of Winter" by The Bangles; Lip-Sync for Your Legacy Winner: Silky Nutmeg Ganache; Silky Nutmeg Ganache receives $10,000 and an extra point
107	6	"Too Many Daddies"	June 5, 2026
The four bottom queens enter the Werk Room and discuss how they will give the points to each other: April Carrión gives her point to Salina EsTitties.; Aura Mayari gives her point to Vivacious.; Salina EsTitties gives her point to April Carrión.; Vivacious gives her point to Aura Mayari.; For this week's main challenge, the queens give drag makeovers to and coach lip-sync performance of "Too Many Daddies" for gay dads. On the runway, the category is "Drag Family Resemblance". After critiques, the judges discuss all of the pairs, ultimately naming Salina EsTitties and Vivacious the Top 2 queens of the week. They lip-sync to "Super Bass" by Nicki Minaj. Salina EsTitties wins the lip-sync and receives the prize. After the lip-sync, the bottom queens award their final MVQ points on the main stage.: April Carrión gives her point to Crystal Methyd.; Aura Mayari gives her point to Silky Nutmeg Ganache.; Crystal Methyd gives her point to Silky Nutmeg Ganache.; Silky Nutmeg Ganache gives her point to April Carrión.; With the most points, Crystal Methyd and Silky Nutmeg Ganache advance from the second bracket to the semi-finals. April Carrión, Aura Mayari, Salina EsTitties, and Vivacious are eliminated. RuPaul also reveals that one eliminated queen will re-enter the competition at the semi-finals.: Guest Judge: Janelle James; Alternative Judge: Ross Matthews; Mini-Challenge: Come up with shady lines to other queens that make them slap you; Mini-Challenge Winner: Silky Nutmeg Ganache; Mini-Challenge Prize: $2,500 cash tip and tickets to Stop! That! Train!; Main Challenge: Give a drag makeover to gay dads and coach them for lip-sync performance of "Too Many Daddies"; Runway Theme: Drag Family Resemblance; Challenge Winners: Salina EsTitties and Vivacious; Points Awarded: 2 to Salina EsTitties and 2 to Vivacious; Lip-Sync Song: "Super Bass" by Nicki Minaj; Lip-Sync for Your Legacy Winner: Salina EsTitties; Salina EsTitties receives $10,000 and an extra point; Advancing to Semi-Finals: Crystal Methyd and Silky Nutmeg Ganache; Eliminated: April Carrión, Aura Mayari, Salina EsTitties and Vivacious
108	7	"Athletic Supporter Design Challenge"	June 12, 2026
Third bracket of queens enters the main stage. For this week's main challenge, the queens need to design an outfit using high school sportswear materials. On the runway, the category is "Athletic Supporter Eleganza". After critiques, the judges highlight Jasmine Kennedie, Kennedy Davenport, and Sam Star, naming Jasmine Kennedie and Sam Star the Top 2 queens of the week. They lip-sync to "If You Were a Woman (And I Was a Man)" by Bonnie Tyler. Sam Starwins the lip-sync and receives the prize.: Guest Judge: Juno Temple; Alternative Judge: Ross Matthews; Main Challenge: Create an outfit using high school sportswear materials; Runway Theme: Athletic Supporter Eleganza; Challenge Winners: Jasmine Kennedie and Sam Star; Points Awarded: 2 to Jasmine Kennedie and 2 to Sam Star; Lip-Sync Song: "If You Were a Woman (And I Was a Man)" by Bonnie Tyler; Lip-Sync for Your Legacy Winner: Sam Star; Sam Star receives $10,000 and an extra point
109	8	"Rappin' Roast Redux"	June 19, 2026
The four bottom queens enter the Werk Room and discuss how they will give the points to each other: Hershii LiqCour-Jeté gives her point to Joey Jay.; Joey Jay gives her point to Hershii LiqCour-Jeté.; Kennedy Davenport gives her point to Shuga Cain.; Shuga Cain gives her point to Kennedy Davenport.; For this week's main challenge, the queens perform in the Rappin' Roast, where they write and perform verses roasting each other and perform in front of an audience. On the runway, the category is "Ladies Who Lunch". After critiques, the judges highlight Hershii LiqCour-Jeté, Joey Jay, and Kennedy Davenport, naming Hershii LiqCour-Jeté and Kennedy Davenport the Top 2 queens of the week. They lip-sync to "The Ladies Who Lunch" by Elaine Stritch. Kennedy Davenport wins the lip-sync and receives the prize.: Guest Judge: Brian Tyree Henry; Alternative Judge: Jamal Sims; Mini-Challenge: Spill the T; Mini-Challenge Winner: Joey Jay and Shuga Cain; Mini-Challenge Prize: $2,500 cash prize ($1,250 for each); Main Challenge: Write and perform verses roasting each other and perform in front of an audience; Runway Theme: Ladies Who Lunch; Challenge Winners: Hershii LiqCour-Jeté and Kennedy Davenport; Points Awarded: 2 to Hershii LiqCour-Jeté and 2 to Kennedy Davenport; Lip-Sync Song: "The Ladies Who Lunch" by Elaine Stritch; Lip-Sync for Your Legacy Winner: Kennedy Davenport; Kennedy Davenport receives $10,000 and an extra point
110	9	"That's What She Said"	June 26, 2026
The four bottom queens enter the Werk Room and discuss how they will give the points to each other: Jasmine Kennedie gives her point to Joey Jay.; Joey Jay gives her point to Jasmine Kennedie.; Sam Star gives her point to Shuga Cain.; Shuga Cain gives her point to Sam Star.; For this week's main challenge, the queens perform lip-sync to interviews from The RuPaul Show while portrays both RuPaul and different celebrity guest: Hershii LiqCour-Jeté: Patti LaBelle; Jasmine Kennedie: Tammy Faye Messner; Joey Jay: Bea Arthur; Kennedy Davenport: Eartha Kitt; Sam Star: Anna Nicole Smith; Shuga Cain: Cher; On the runway, the category is "David Bowie, Icon". After critiques, the judges discuss all of the queens, ultimately naming Kennedy Davenport and Sam Star the Top 2 queens of the week. They lip-sync to "Breakin' Dishes" by Rihanna. Kennedy Davenport wins the lip-sync and receives the prize. After the lip-sync, the bottom queens award their final MVQ points on the main stage.: Hershii LiqCour-Jeté gives her point to Jasmine Kennedie.; Jasmine Kennedie gives her point to Hershii LiqCour-Jeté.; Joey Jay gives her point to Jasmine Kennedie.; Shuga Cain gives her point to Jasmine Kennedie.; With the most points, Kennedy Davenport advance from the first bracket to the semi-finals. Since Jasmine Kennedie and Sam Star were tied in points, RuPaul then explains if queens were tied in points, the decision of the advancing queen would be on RuPaul. RuPaul then chose both of Jasmine Kennedie and Sam Star. Hershii LiqCour-Jeté, Joey Jay, and Shuga Cain are eliminated. RuPaul also reveals that one eliminated queen will re-enter the competition at the semi-finals. At the end of the episode, RuPaul and Michelle Visage discussed and chose one eliminated queen from each bracket whom they think deserves another shot for return to the competition through wild card lottery. Morgan McMichaels is chosen from first bracket, Salina EsTitties is chosen from second bracket, and Joey Jay is chosen from third bracket. The wild card lottery result will be announced in the next episode.: Guest Judge: Bronwyn Newport; Alternative Judge: Law Roach; Main Challenge: Lip sync to interviews from The RuPaul Show while portray both RuPaul and celebrity guest; Runway Theme: David Bowie, Icon; Challenge Winners: Kennedy Davenport and Sam Star; Points Awarded: 2 to Kennedy Davenport and 2 to Sam Star; Lip-Sync Song: "Breakin' Dishes" by Rihanna; Lip-Sync for Your Legacy Winner: Kennedy Davenport; Kennedy Davenport receives $10,000 and an extra point; Advancing to Semi-Finals: Jasmine Kennedie, Kennedy Davenport, and Sam Star; Eliminated: Hershii LiqCour-Jeté, Joey Jay and Shuga Cain
111	10	"Tell Me Something Good"	July 3, 2026
The seven advancing queens from all brackets compete together for the first time. RuPaul then announces the wild card lottery winner is Joey Jay. RuPaul also announces that for this season, the bottom two queens will be determined by the queens themselves using Rate-A-Queen MVQ Edition. For this week's main challenge, the queens write and perform a storytelling in "Tell Me Something Good" Story Hour. On the runway, category is Red Carpet Realness. After critiques, the judges discuss all of the queens, ultimately naming Crystal Methyd the winner of the main challenge. A'keria C. Davenport and Kennedy Davenport was ranked as the bottom two by the other queens and will lip-sync for their life. A'keria C. Davenport and Kennedy Davenport lip-sync to "Nobody's Supposed to Be Here (Hex Hector Dance Mix)" by Deborah Cox. A'keria C. Davenport wins the lip-sync and Kennedy Davenport sashays away.: Guest Judge: Evan Mulrooney; Alternative Judge: Carson Kressley; Returned: Joey Jay; Main Challenge: Write and perform "Tell Me Something Good" Story Hour; Runway Theme: Red Carpet Realness; Challenge Winner: Crystal Methyd; Challenge Prize: $10,000 cash prize; Bottom Two: A'keria C. Davenport and Kennedy Davenport; Lip-Sync Song: "Nobody's Supposed to Be Here (Hex Hector Dance Mix)" by Deborah Cox; Eliminated: Kennedy Davenport
112	11	"Tournament of All Stars Talent Rumble"	July 10, 2026
For this week's main challenge, the queens performing a talent in Tournament of All Stars Talent Rumble. The acts are as follows: A'keria C. Davenport: Original song lip-sync; Crystal Methyd: Comedy burlesque; Dawn: Original song lip-sync / Comedy burlesque; Jasmine Kennedie: Original song lip-sync / Cheerleading routine; Joey Jay: Original song lip-sync / Ballroom dancing; Sam Star: Original song lip-sync; Silky Nutmeg Ganache: Original song lip-sync / Majorette dancing; On the runway, category is It's Giving Crowned Queen. After critiques, the judges discuss all of the queens, ultimately naming Crystal Methyd the winner of the main challenge. A'keria C. Davenport and Sam Star was ranked as the bottom two by the other queens and will lip-sync for their life. A'keria C. Davenport and Sam Star lip-sync to "Run the World (Girls)" by Beyoncé. A'keria C. Davenport wins the lip-sync and Sam Star sashays away.: Guest Judge: Cooper Koch; Alternative Judge: Ts Madison; Mini-Challenge: Lip-sync to "U Wear It Well" by RuPaul while being hosed by the Pit Crew; Mini-Challenge Winner: Sam Star; Mini-Challenge Prize: $2,500 cash prize; Main Challenge: Perform a talent in Tournament of All Stars Talent Rumble; Runway Theme: It's Giving Crowned Queen; Challenge Winner: Crystal Methyd; Challenge Prize: $10,000 cash prize; Bottom Two: A'keria C. Davenport and Sam Star; Lip-Sync Song: "Run the World (Girls)" by Beyoncé; Eliminated: Sam Star
113	12	"Disco Smackdown for the Crown"	July 17, 2026
For this week's grand finale, the queens must participating in lip-sync tournament, Disco Smackdown for the Crown. RuPaul then announces that based on their performance during semi-finals, Crystal Methyd and Jasmine Kennedie are advanced directly to the second round. In the first round, Silky Nutmeg Ganache gets picked and chooses Dawn to lip-sync against. Dawn then chooses "Star Love" by Cheryl Lynn. Silky Nutmeg Ganache wins the lip-sync and Dawn sashays away. The final two queens, A'keria C. Davenport and Joey Jay, lip-sync to "The Boss" by Diana Ross choosen by Joey Jay. Joey Jay wins the lip-sync and A'keria C. Davenport sashays away. In the second round, Silky Nutmeg Ganache gets picked and chooses Joey Jay to lip-sync against. Joey Jay then chooses "The Main Event/Fight" by Barbra Streisand. Joey Jay wins the lip-sync and Silky Nutmeg Ganache sashays away. The final two queens, Crystal Methyd and Jasmine Kennedie, lip-sync to "Knock on Wood" by Amii Stewart. Crystal Methyd wins the lip-sync and Jasmine Kennedie sashays away. In the final round, Crystal Methyd and Joey Jay lip-sync to "MacArthur Park" by Donna Summer. After the lip-sync it is declared that Crystal Methyd is the winner of the season, leaving Joey Jay as runner-up and receives a $25,000 cash prize.: Alternative Judge: Jamal Sims and Ross Matthews; Main Challenge: Participate in a Disco Smackdown for the Crown lip-sync tournament; Lip-Sync Songs: "Star Love" by Cheryl Lynn, "The Boss" by Diana Ross, "The Main Event/Fight" by Barbra Streisand, "Knock on Wood" by Amii Stewart, "MacArthur Park" by Donna Summer; Advanced to Round 2: Crystal Methyd and Jasmine Kennedie; Round 1 Lip-Sync Winners: Silky Nutmeg Ganache and Joey Jay; Round 2 Lip-Sync Winners: Crystal Methyd and Joey Jay; Eliminated: Dawn, A'keria C. Davenport, Silky Nutmeg Ganache, Jasmine Kennedie; Runner-up: Joey Jay; Winner of RuPaul's Drag Race All Stars Season 11: Crystal Methyd
