= Mystique Summers Madison =

American drag performer

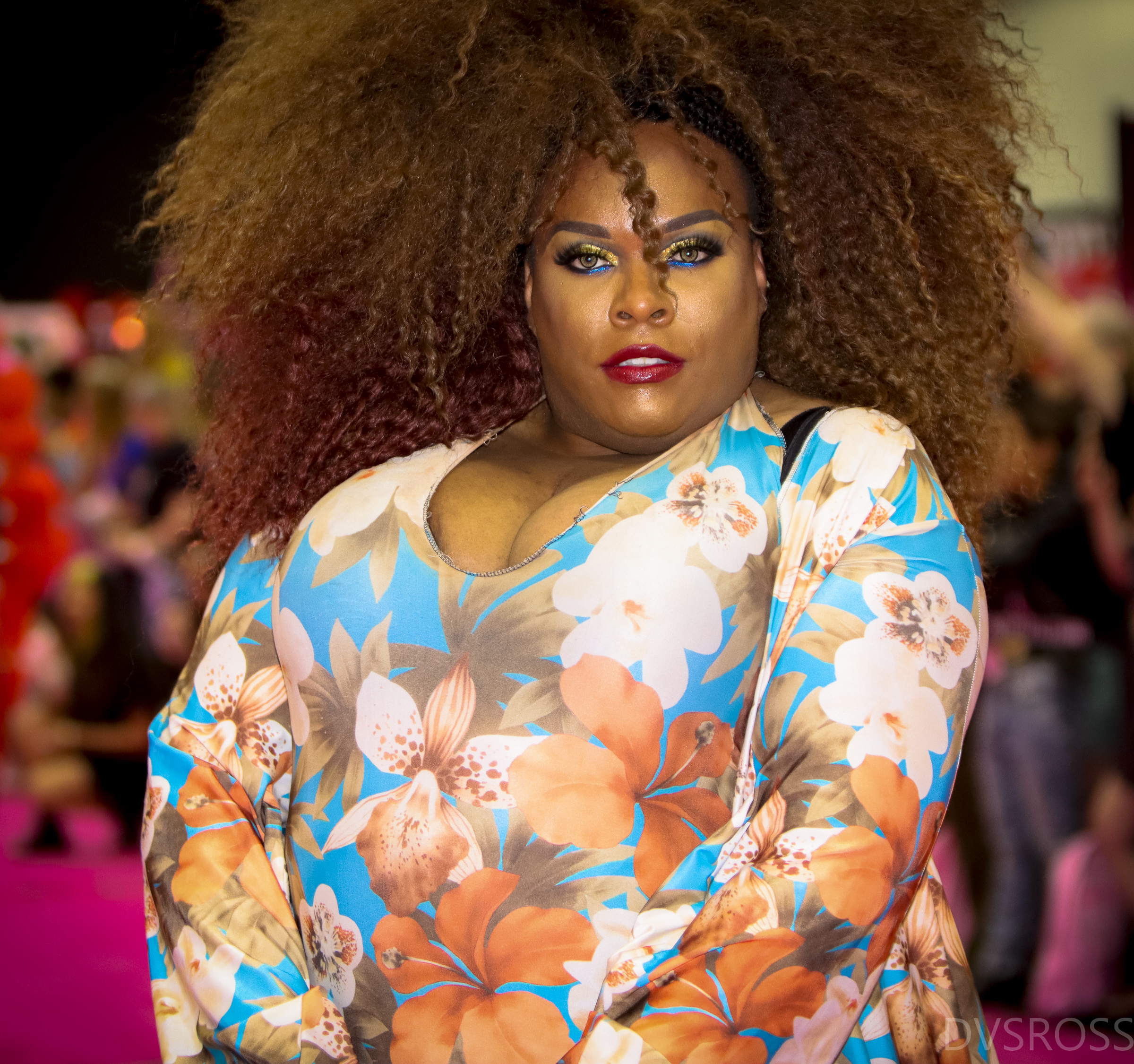
- Mystique Summers Madison at RuPaul's DragCon LA, 2022
- Born: Donté Sims; 1984 or 1985 (age 41–42)
- Other names: Mystique Summers
- Occupation: Drag performer
- Television: RuPaul's Drag Race (season 2); RuPaul's Drag Race All Stars (season 11)

Mystique Summers Madison (or simply Mystique Summers) (born 1984/5) is the stage name of Donté Sims, an American drag performer who competed on the second season of RuPaul's Drag Race and the eleventh season of its All Stars spin-off. Based in Texas, Mystique Summers Madison continues to perform in drag shows and participate in Drag Race-related events such as RuPaul's DragCon LA.

== Career ==
Sims is a drag performer who competed as Mystique Summers Madison on the second season (2010) of RuPaul's Drag Race, at the age of 25. She has continued to perform in drag shows and host events, mostly in Texas. In 2015, she was part of the line-up of "Big Phat Loser", an event in Philadelphia spearheaded by Mimi Imfurst featuring "plus-size" contestants from Drag Race. Mystique Summers Madison participated in a show to raise funds for Puerto Rico residents impacted by the destruction of Hurricane Maria in 2017, and emceed a show sponsored by AARP in 2019.

In 2020, Mystique Summers Madison was slated to be a featured guest at RuPaul's DragCon LA. She remained part of the line-up when the scheduled event became RuPaul's Digital DragCon because of the COVID-19 pandemic. Mystique Summers Madison was also part of the line-up of "Introvert: An Online Drag Show Built Just for You", an online drag show held in conjunction with Pride Portland (Oregon), as well as the Twitch-hosted show "Black Girl Magic", which featured Black contestants from Drag Race and other entertainers. Mystique Summers Madison was a guest at DragCon LA in 2022. She and fellow Drag Race contestant Kennedy Davenport performed in "A Decade of Drag", as part of an annual drag show at the University of Texas at Arlington, with tips benefitting the Maverick Rainbow Scholarship.

=== RuPaul's Drag Race and Untucked ===
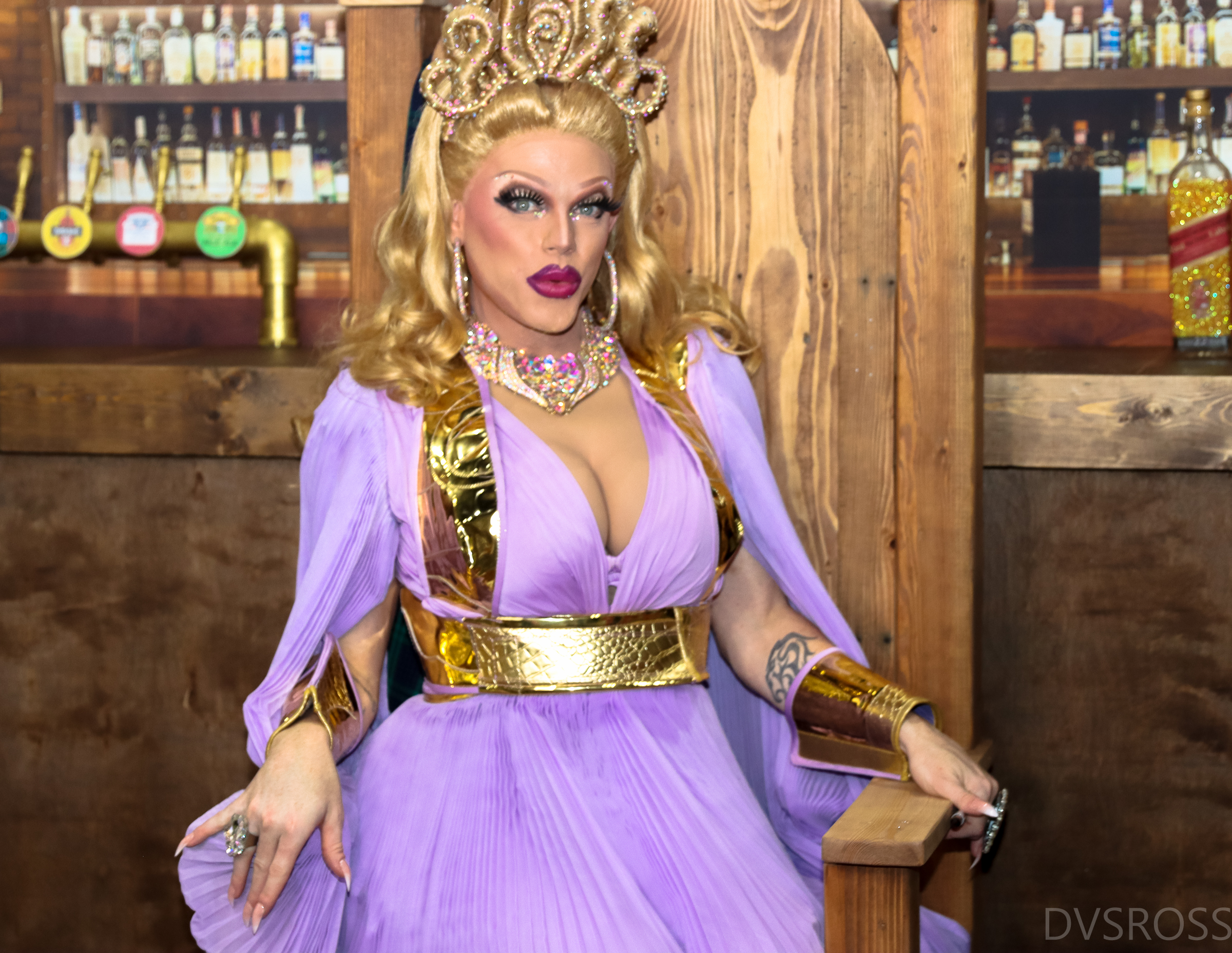
The fight between Mystique Summers Madison and fellow contestant Morgan McMichaels (pictured in 2023), has been called one of the "most dramatic" and "messiest" in the history of RuPaul's Drag Race and its companion show RuPaul's Drag Race: Untucked, respectively.

On Drag Race, Mystique Summers Madison placed tenth overall. She was eliminated on the third episode, the main challenge of which required contestants to act as feuding families in a television advertisement. She placed in the bottom two and lost a lip-sync against Raven to "I Hear You Knocking" by Wynonna Judd. In 2017, Thrillist's Brian Moylan ranked Mystique Summers Madison number 86 out of the show's 113 contestants. Ryan Shea ranked her number 97 out of 126 in Instinct's similar list in 2018. The Spinoff ranked "I Hear You Knocking" number 138 in a 2019 "definitive ranking" of the show's 162 lip-syncs to date.

On the first episode of the companion show RuPaul's Drag Race: Untucked, Mystique Summers Madison said "Bitch, I'm from Chicago!" to fellow contestant Morgan McMichaels during an argument described by Gay Times as a "legendary throwdown". The catchphrase was described by Tom Fitzgerald and Lorenzo Marquez as a "direct and simple" insult (or "read") in Legendary Children: The First Decade of RuPaul's Drag Race and the Last Century of Queer Life (2020), and became a part of the franchise's history.

The argument was included in Them's 2018 list of the ten "messiest fights" on Untucked, as well as Screen Rant's 2021 list of the show's ten "most unforgettable" moments. In 2021, Dylan Kickham called Mystique Summers Madison's threat an "iconic quote" in Elite Daily's overview of the "most dramatic" feuds on Drag Race to date, and Hunter Ingram of Variety said the fight "should have inspired Chicago's new tourism slogan" in 2023. Valentina referenced Mystique Summers Madison when "reading" Latrice Royale on season 4 (2018) of RuPaul's Drag Race All Stars.

In April 2026, Mystique was confirmed to be competing on the eleventh season of RuPaul's Drag Race All Stars in the first bracket. Her season 2 castmate Morgan McMichaels, with whom she had her famous argument, is competing in the same bracket.

== Personal life ==
Sims is from Texas, and has lived in Bedford. He creates some of his own outfits for shows, and cooking is among his hobbies.

== Filmography ==
=== Television ===
- RuPaul's Drag Race (season 2)
- RuPaul's Drag Race: Untucked
- RuPaul's Drag Race All Stars (season 11)

=== Web series ===
- Fashion Photo RuView (2015)
