= Snatch Game (disambiguation) =

Snatch Game is a recurring challenge in the Drag Race franchise.

Snatch Game may also refer to:

- "The Snatch Game" (RuPaul's Drag Race season 2), a 2010 American television episode
- "The Snatch Game" (RuPaul's Drag Race season 3), a 2011 American television episode
- "Snatch Game" (RuPaul's Drag Race season 4), a 2012 American television episode
- "Snatch Game" (RuPaul's Drag Race season 5), a 2013 American television episode
- "Snatch Game" (RuPaul's Drag Race season 6), a 2014 American television episode
- "Snatch Game" (RuPaul's Drag Race season 7), a 2015 American television episode
- "Snatch Game" (RuPaul's Drag Race season 9), a 2017 American television episode
- "Snatch Game" (RuPaul's Drag Race season 10), a 2018 American television episode
- "Snatch Game" (RuPaul's Drag Race season 12), a 2020 American television episode
- "Snatch Game" (RuPaul's Drag Race season 14), a 2022 American television episode
- "Snatch Game" (RuPaul's Drag Race season 16), a 2024 American television episode
- "Snatch Game" (RuPaul's Drag Race season 17), a 2025 American television episode

== See also ==
- "Snatch Game at Sea", a 2019 American television episode
- "Supermodel Snatch Game", a 2016 American television episode
- "Supersized Snatch Game", a 2023 American television episode
