= Kennedy Davenport =

American drag queen (born 1980)

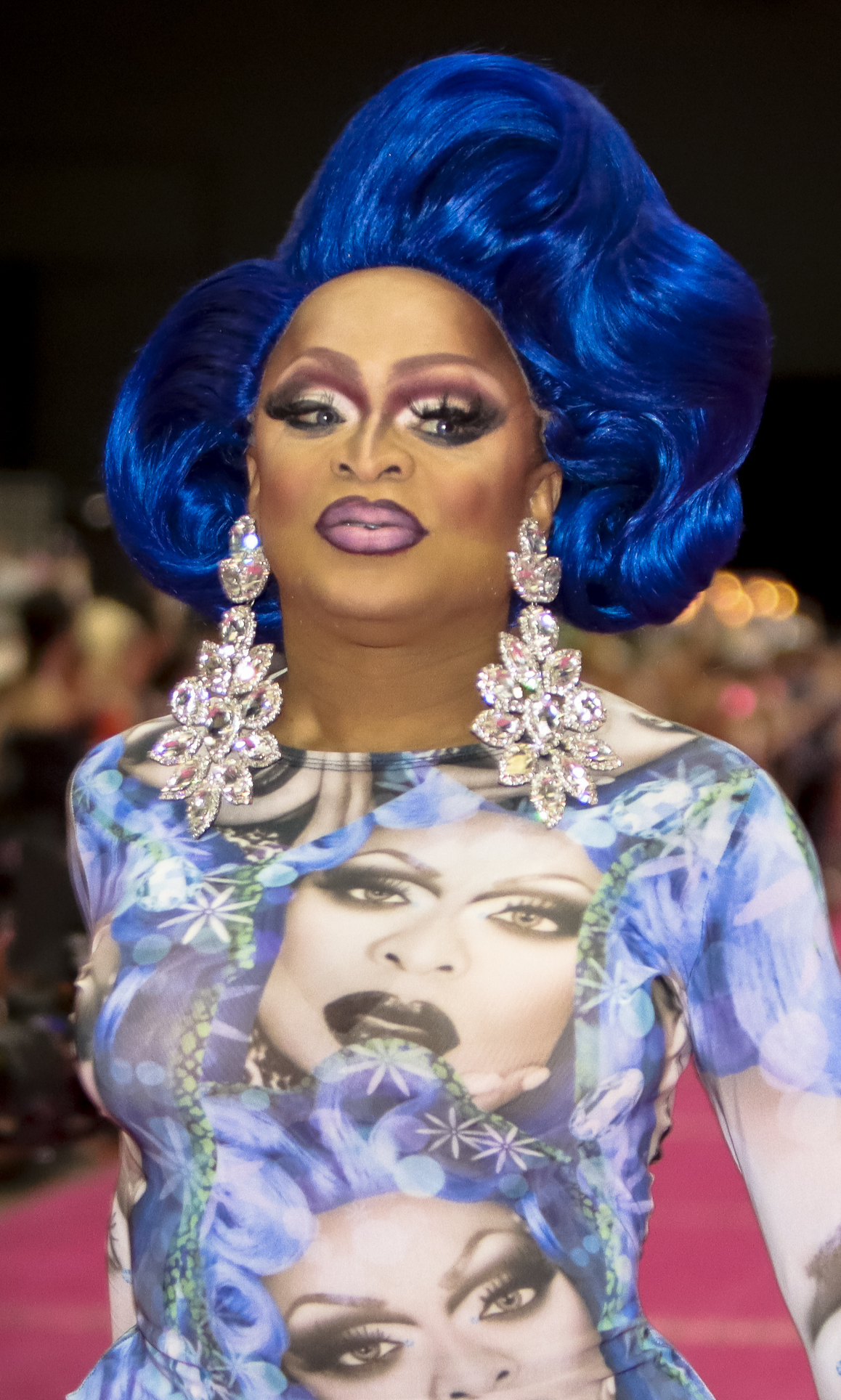
- Davenport at RuPaul's DragCon LA, 2022
- Born: Reuben Asberry Jr. September 9, 1980 (age 46); Dallas, Texas, U.S.
- Education: University of North Carolina School of the Arts
- Occupations: Drag queen, television personality, dancer
- Known for: RuPaul's Drag Race; RuPaul's Drag Race All Stars; Canada's Drag Race: Canada vs. the World

Reuben Asberry Jr. (born September 9, 1980), known professionally as Kennedy Davenport, is a drag queen, television personality, and dancer from Dallas, Texas, who came to international attention on the seventh season of RuPaul's Drag Race, the third and eleventh seasons of RuPaul's Drag Race All Stars, and the second season of Canada's Drag Race: Canada vs. the World.

== Career ==
Davenport first appeared on television in the eighth season of America's Got Talent in 2013. He was eliminated in the Vegas round.

He was announced as one of the fourteen contestants in season seven of RuPaul's Drag Race on March 2, 2015, where he placed fourth overall. After this, he made a one-episode appearance on Skin Wars with fellow Drag Race contestants. On October 20, 2017, Davenport was announced as one of the returning queens for RuPaul's Drag Race All Stars 3. Davenport ultimately was the runner-up overall, losing to Trixie Mattel.

Outside of Drag Race, Asberry has won numerous titles in drag pageants, including Miss Gay USofA 2019, Miss Gay Orlando 2016, Miss D’Elegance International 2013, and Miss Gay Black USofA 2009. His dance performances are his signature component.

Davenport also works as a musician; he released his first single, "Moving Up", featuring rapper Dresia Dee on March 16, 2018.

In July 2020, he returned to the fifth season of RuPaul's Drag Race All Stars as a Lip-Sync Assassin. He lip-synced against Miz Cracker to "Fancy" by Reba McEntire but lost.

In April 2023, Davenport and his Drag Race alumni Jan Sport, Manila Luzon and Olivia Lux performed alongside Kelsea Ballerini at the CMT Music Awards, held in Austin, Texas. The performance was seen as Ballerini's support to drag performers following the passing of the Tennessee drag ban.

In April 2026, Davenport was announced to be competing in the eleventh season of RuPaul's Drag Race All Stars in the third bracket. His All Stars season three castmate Morgan McMichaels is also competing on the season.

== Personal life ==
Asberry was born to Checkery Marie Thacker. His father, Reuben Asberry Sr., died on October 25, 2013. Prior to pursuing drag, he spent some time in the United States Navy.

A $33,000 bank payment was needed to prevent his house from being foreclosed upon. A GoFundMe page was created to help pay off the house note, and a drag event was held to support him, featuring fellow Drag Race alumni.

His drag mother is Kelexis Davenport, who is also drag mother to the late season 2 Drag Race contestant Sahara Davenport. Another one of Kennedy's drag sisters, Bianca Gisele Davenport Starr, was murdered on December 8, 2017. Drag Race season 11 contestant A'keria C. Davenport, and other Drag Race Contestants throughout the years (Honey Davenport, Monét X Change and Ra'Jah O'Hara) are among members of the Davenport drag family.

Asberry is currently dating Messia Adonís, a trans man. In the premiere episode of the second season of Canada's Drag Race: Canada vs. the World, he revealed that he and his partner were expecting their first child together. However, after the episode aired, Asberry announced on social media that the two had a miscarriage. On a social media post, Asberry wrote: "We both understand that God makes no mistakes and we understand what he has for us, will be for us. We both live our lives to be a testament for others to help, elevate, motivate, and encourage. I want to thank you all for the love and support that you have shown thus far. Continue to put God first and have an awesome day. We are good."

== Pageant history ==
- Miss Gay Black USofA 2009
- Miss Tampa Bay International 2009
- Miss Glamorous 2010
- North Carolina All American Goddess 2010
- Miss Parliament House 2010
- Miss Revolution 2010
- Miss Treasure Coast 2010
- Miss Gay South Central States USofA 2011
- Miss Parliament House 2011
- Miss Gay Georgia USofA 2012
- Miss Texas FFI 2012
- Mid America All American Goddess 2013
- All American Goddess (3rd Alternate)
- Miss D’Elegance International 2013
- Miss Gay Orlando 2016
- Miss West Palm Beach International 2016
- Miss Gay Texas USofA 2017 (1st Alternate)
- Miss Gay USofA 2017 (1st Alternate)
- Miss Gay USofA 2019
- Miss Pride South Florida 2019

== Filmography ==
=== Film ===
Year	Title	Role	Ref.
2019	Trixie Mattel: Moving Parts	Himself	
2025	Noah's Arc: The Movie	Queen Kennedy	

=== Television ===
Year	Title	Role	Notes	Ref
2013	America's Got Talent	Himself (contestant)	Season 8	
2015	RuPaul's Drag Race	Herself (contestant)	Season 7 (4th place)	
2016	Skin Wars	Herself	Episode: "Miss Skin Wars"	
2018	RuPaul's Drag Race: All Stars	Herself (contestant)	Season 3 (Runner-Up)	
2020	AJ and the Queen	Drag queen	Guest appearance	
2020	RuPaul's Drag Race All Stars (season 5)	Herself	Guest (“Lipsync Assassin”); Episode: "Stand-Up Smackdown"	
2020	RuPaul's Drag Race All Stars: Untucked (season 2)	Herself	Guest (“Lipsync Assassin”); Episode: "Stand-Up Smackdown"	
2023	57th Annual CMT Music Awards	Herself	Performer with Kelsea Ballerini, Jan Sport, Manila Luzon & Olivia Lux	
2024	Canada's Drag Race: Canada vs. the World	Herself (contestant)	Season 2 (3rd place)	
2026	RuPaul's Drag Race All Stars	Herself (contestant)	season 11 (8th place)	

=== Music videos ===
Year	Title	Artist
2015	"Uptown Fish"	Shangela

=== Web series ===
Year	Title	Role	Notes	Ref.
2015	RuPaul's Drag Race: Untucked	Herself	Companion show to RuPaul's Drag Race	
2015	Transformations	Herself	Guest	
2016	Hey Qween!	Herself	2 episodes, Guest	
2016	How To Makeup	Herself	World of Wonder series	
2016	Fashion Photo RuView	Herself	Guest, alongside Raven and Raja	
2018	Before She Walks In	Herself	Guest	
2018	Whatcha Packin'	Herself	Guest	
2018	Cosmo Queens	Herself	Season Three, Episode Ten	
2019	Detailz	Herself	Guest	
2019	Werq The World	Herself	Season 1	
2019	Follow Me	Herself	Episode: "Mayhem Miller"	
2021	Pageant Pod	Herself	Podcast by Moguls of Media	
2021	Binge	Herself	Podcast by Entertainment Weekly	
2021	The Pit Stop	Herself	1 episode, companion show to RuPaul's Drag Race All Stars season 6	
2023	Give It To Me Straight	Herself	Guest	
2024-2025	RuPaul's Drag Race Live Untucked	Herself	WOWPresents Plus original; season 1–2, 10 episodes	

== Theatre ==
Year	Production	Role	Venue	Ref(s)
2019	The Gospel According to Kennedy Davenport	Herself	Laurie Beechman Theatre	

== Discography ==
=== Singles ===
Title	Year	Album
"Moving Up"	2018	Non-album single

==== As featured artist ====
Title	Year	Peak chart positions	Album
Title	Year	US Dance	Album
"Drag Up Your Life" (RuPaul featuring the Cast of RuPaul's Drag Race All Stars season 3)	2018	—	Non-album single
"Kitty Girl" (RuPaul featuring the Cast of RuPaul's Drag Race All Stars season 3)	2018	18	Non-album single
"Tongue Pop" (The Cast of Canada's Drag Race: Canada vs The World)	2024	—	Non-album single

=== Other appearances ===
Title	Year	Other artist(s)	Album
"Throw Ya Hands Up"	2015	RuPaul	RuPaul Presents CoverGurlz 2
"Cha Cha Heels"	2016	Lucian Piane, Katya Zamolodchikova	RuPaul's Drag Race: The Rusical
"One Last Christmas Card"	2017	Adam Barta featuring Mrs. Kasha Davis, Eureka O'Hara, and Kennedy Davenport	Non-album singles
