= Tyra Sanchez =

American drag queen and reality television personality

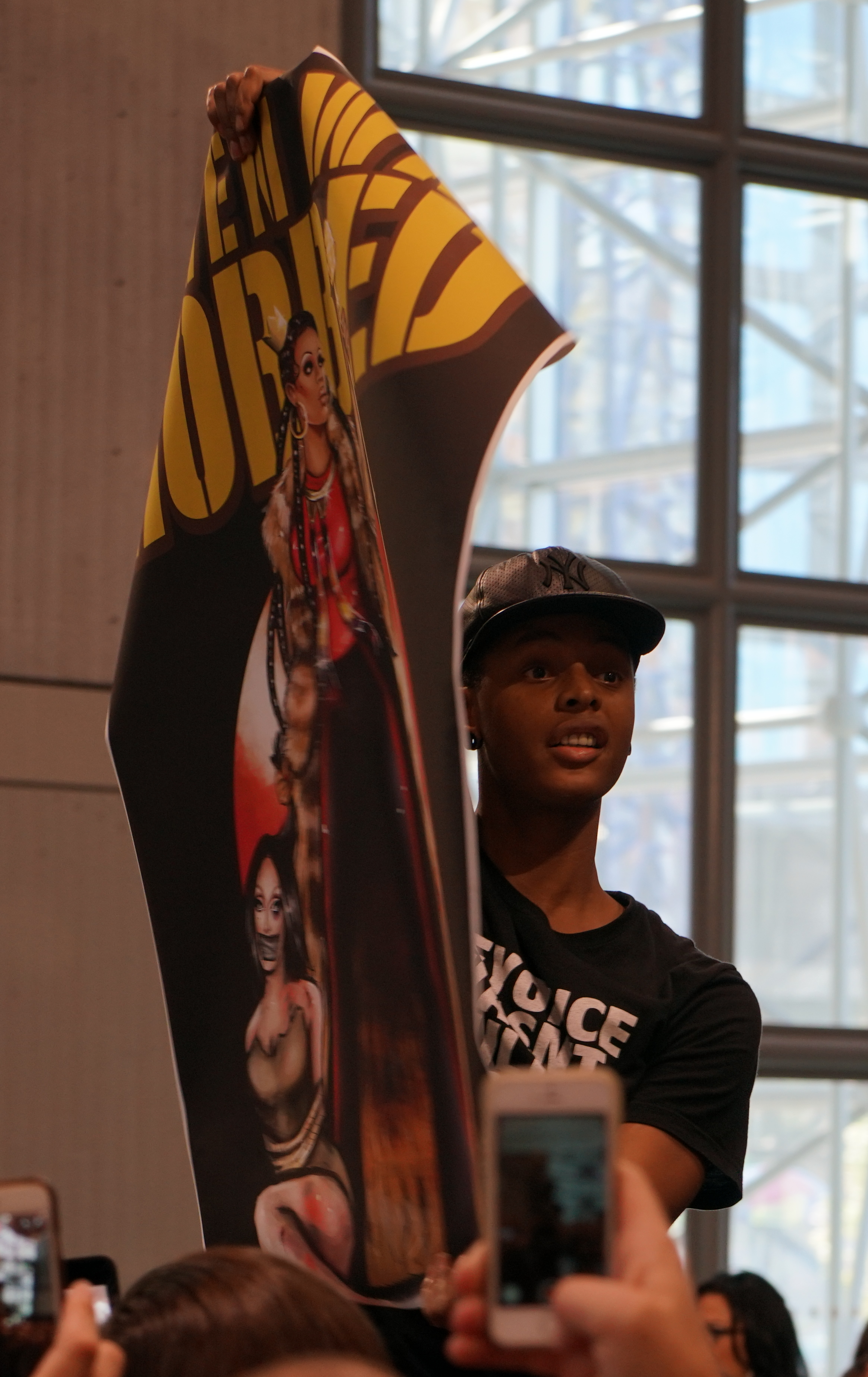
- Ross at RuPaul's DragCon NYC in 2015
- Born: James William Ross IV; April 21, 1988 (age 38); Gainesville, Florida, U.S.
- Other name: King Tyra
- Known for: RuPaul's Drag Race season 2 winner
- Children: 2
- Website: kingtyra.com

King Tyra, formerly Tyra Sanchez, is the stage name of James William Ross IV (born April 21, 1988), an American drag queen and reality television personality. A frequent drag impersonator of pop star Beyoncé, Tyra is known as winner of the second season of RuPaul's Drag Race, receiving $25,000. After retiring from his drag character Tyra Sanchez in a public Instagram post in March 2020, Ross announced his return to drag on September 14, 2022, under the name King Tyra via his OnlyFans, before moving all drag content back to Instagram in August 2023.

== Career ==
A native of Gainesville, Florida, Ross moved to Orlando, where he has resided for most of his life. His drag mother was Angelica Sanchez Jones, a popular performer in the Orlando area. During his time on RuPaul's Drag Race, Ross spoke candidly about his periods of homelessness and personal challenges prior to auditioning for and being selected to appear on the show. Ross' old-school drag style and glamour made him a favorite of the judges. Currently residing in Orlando, Ross performed throughout the United States and Canada.

At the time he won the title, Ross was one of the youngest contestants to appear on RuPaul's Drag Race. Throughout his time on the show, he was referred to by RuPaul as "the other Tyra" purportedly in order to not cause confusion with America's Next Top Model host Tyra Banks. He was also the first ever winner in the show's history to never be in the bottom two, a feat that has been repeated by winners Bianca Del Rio, Violet Chachki, Sasha Velour, Aquaria, Sasha Colby, and Nymphia Wind.

After winning Drag Race, Ross served as a drag professor and mentor of beauty- and fashion-challenged women on the second season of RuPaul's Drag U. In April 2011, Ross released his first dance single, "Look at Me". He released a second single, "Vogue" on October 13, 2016. He then released a spoken word EP, Dear Drag Race Fans Book I, on July 11, 2017, following the controversy surrounding him and Morgan McMichaels.

In 2012, Ross starred in the music video for "Hey Jane" by British rock band Spiritualized.

=== Retirement and return ===
On October 8, 2019, after a period of inactivity, Ross released an apology statement on his social media accounts, taking responsibility for his past actions. "I humbly apologize for the online behavior I have displayed in recent years," he stated. "Though it represents emotions I may have felt, it does not represent my true character. I have failed you and I know that I am much better than that.... it's not who I am and it is not who I choose to be." In explaining the reasons behind his behavior, he said that "The judgement, criticism, and opinions I received daily really affected my vibes and it began to control my environment... I was on an extreme roller coaster of emotions. So many ups and too many downs. Exhausted, I was just ready to get off the ride."

Just over five months later, Ross publicly announced his decision to quit drag, stating on his official Instagram page, "For those who may be asking, Tyra Sanchez has fulfilled her purpose in my life. I, James Ross, no longer want to be referred to as Tyra, Tyra Sanchez, her, she, girl, or queen."

On September 14, 2022, Ross announced his return to drag, now under the name "King Tyra", exclusively on his OnlyFans. On January 26, 2023, Tyra announced her comeback tour, Club Tyra, visiting nineteen cities across the United States.

==== Exposed interview ====
In an April 2023 Exposed interview with Joseph Shepherd, Ross shared he has accepted people calling him Tyra Sanchez, even with his new drag name being King Tyra. Ross expressed the wish that people not refer to him as "queen", which is why he rebranded as King Tyra. In the interview, he named Michelle Visage as antagonistic to him early on, publicly opposing his Drag Race win. Ross stated he believes RuPaul supported his win at the time, despite producers and sponsorships opposing it. Ross claimed that he was never banned from DragCon, but rather asked to write an apology stating he does not condone violence. Allegedly, Ross did so but World of Wonder rejected the statement. He has not had contact with them since. When asked if he would ever go on Drag Race again, Ross responded, "If you met Tina Turner, would you ever ask her, 'Will you please get back with Ike?' If you met a 15-year-old girl, would you ever ask her, 'Would you please go with R. Kelly?' Why do you guys keep asking me to go back to my abuser?"

== Controversies ==
On August 10, 2016, after a fan of the show called him annoying in a tweet followed by gun emojis, Ross replied with the message "Girl kill yourself". This was met with backlash and outrage across Twitter and Facebook. He later stated that he would not apologize for his opinion, and went on to call those who die by suicide "cowards". A petition was made calling for RuPaul to revoke Ross's crown and title, or at the very least speak out against it. RuPaul broke silence in his podcast, defending Ross and stated: "Twitter is not the place for that. People don't get nuance on Twitter, you can't do irony on Twitter, people won't get it." During the podcast, Michelle Visage added: "On Twitter, you don't hear inflection, you don't hear snark, you don't hear sarcasm."

In 2017, Ross posted a mock obituary for Morgan McMichaels and used the post to direct people to Ross's personal SoundCloud page. McMichaels quickly denounced the post. McMichaels later said the post was meant as retribution for her blocking Ross' booking at Mickey's nightclub in West Hollywood. After Ross made comments about the drag queen Raven, McMichaels said she would not perform with Ross, and Ross lost the booking. Ross later apologized for the post about McMichaels. McMichaels later lampooned the scenario upon her re-appearance on the third season of RuPaul's Drag Race All Stars; as she made her entrance to the workroom, she joked "I look pretty good for a dead bitch".

Ross was announced as being banned from attending the 2018 RuPaul's DragCon LA event after being accused of making a terrorist threat against DragCon. His official website had a timer set for the date and time of DragCon 2018 with the acronym "B.O.O.M." at the top of the page; however, no act of violence was made when the timer ended.

In August 2020, Ross was arrested and charged with criminal damage after allegedly spray painting the side of an apartment building with the words "don't move here ever".

In May 2023, Ross was arrested in Starke, Florida after allegedly threatening to shoot a police officer who had responded to a minor traffic accident Ross was involved in. Two months later, in July, he was arrested again for causing a traffic jam as a result of his protest against the circumstances of his May arrest, which he underwent while wearing a dildo.

"Yet it doesn't compare to the fumes of the crematorium."

— Tyra Sanchez, in a response to one of The Vivienne's tweets from 2020 after her death

=== Comments about deceased drag queens ===
In January 2025, Ross posted on X, following the death of RuPaul's Drag Race UK winner The Vivienne, a comment in response to a 2020 tweet referencing "Tyra fuming". His tweets about The Vivienne's death were viewed as inhumane, and was condemned by various Drag Race alumni, including Kandy Muse, Tatianna, Denali, as well as RuPaul, who posted a resurfaced video of him fake-slapping Tyra during the second season of RuPaul's Drag Race. The show was later called on to strip Tyra as the winner of the second season of RuPaul's Drag Race.

"Mwauh!... NO LEG."

— Tyra Sanchez, in a response to Jaremi Carey's statement after the death of Jiggly Caliente

In April 2025, Tyra posted a similar tweet following the death of Drag Race season 4 alum and Drag Race Philippines judge Jiggly Caliente. Caliente's season 4 castmate and close friend Jaremi Carey (Phi Phi O'Hara) posted a tribute to her, to which Tyra responded by making fun of Caliente's recent contraction of sepsis and subsequent amputation of her leg.

== Discography ==
=== Studio albums ===
Title	Details
Dear Drag Race Fans Book I	Released: July 12, 2017; Label: self-released; Formats: digital download

=== Singles ===
Title	Year	Album
"Vogue"	2017	Non-album single

== Filmography ==
=== Television ===
Year	Title	Role	Notes
2008	The Real Housewives of Atlanta	Himself	1 episode
2010	RuPaul's Drag Race (season 2)	Himself	Contestant (Winner)
2010	RuPaul's Drag Race: Untucked	Himself	
2011	RuPaul's Drag U	Himself	Drag Professor
2012	Kandi Koated Nights	Himself	1 episode
2016	Skin Wars	Himself	Guest
2016	RuPaul's Drag Race (season 8)	Himself	2 episodes

=== Music videos ===
Year	Title	Artist	Notes	Ref.
2012	"Hey Jane"	Spiritualized		

=== Web series ===
Year	Title	Role	Notes	Ref.
2015	Drag Queens React	Himself	Guest	

Awards and achievements
Preceded by BeBe Zahara Benet	Winner of RuPaul's Drag Race; US season 2	Succeeded by Raja
