= Evan Mulrooney =

American actor and comedian

- Born: January 1993 (age 33); Wilmington, Delaware
- Occupations: Actor, comedian
- Years active: 2016–present
- Known for: "Stop! That! Train!", Only Murders in the Building, Fargo, Justified: City Primeval, South Side
- Website: https://www.evanmulrooney.com

Evan Mulrooney (born 1993) is an American actor, comedian, and former collegiate football player. He is known for season 5 of Only Murders in the Building (Hulu, 2025) and recurring roles on the television series Fargo (FX), Justified: City Primeval, and the sitcom South Side.

== Early life and education ==
Mulrooney grew up in Wilmington, Delaware, and attended the University of Maryland on a full football scholarship. He moved to Chicago in 2016 to pursue a career in comedy.

== Career ==
=== Stage and improv ===
In Chicago, Mulrooney performed at Steppenwolf Theatre Company and is a member of the creative ensemble at The Annoyance Theatre. He acted in Shitfyre: The Musical. He also performed long‑form improv at iO Chicago.

=== Television ===
Mulrooney’s television credits include recurring and guest appearances on Only Murders in the Building as Vinny Caccimelio, one of the sons of Sofia Caccimelio (Téa Leoni) who ended the season in a relationship with the character of Howard Morris

He appeared on RuPaul's Drag Race All Stars season 11 as a guest judge and returned for the finale as a Pit Crew member.

=== Film and commercial work ===
Mulrooney’s film work includes a supporting role in Stop! That! Train! (2026) and the upcoming comedy What the F*ck Is My Password?. He has appeared in national commercials, most notably for Planet Fitness and Kia’s NBA All‑Star Weekend campaigns in 2022 and 2023.

== Filmography ==
=== Television ===
Year	Title	Role	Notes
2026	RuPaul's Drag Race All Stars season 11	Guest Judge	Episodes 10 and 12
2025	Only Murders in the Building (Season 5)	Vinny Caccimelio	Recurring (4 episodes)
2024	Fargo	Joe Bulo	Recurring (4 episodes)
2023	Justified: City Primeval	Agron Darke	Guest star
2022	South Side	—	Co‑star
2022	Dexter: Resurrection	Dave	Guest star (S1 Ep 110)
2021	Seal Team	—	Co‑star
2020	Chicago Fire	Dwayne	Guest (S8 Ep 17)

=== Film ===
Year	Title	Role	Notes
TBD	WTF Is My Password?!		Feature film
2026	Stop That Train!	Chet	Feature film
2020	Start Without Me	Supporting	Feature film

=== Commercials ===
Year	Brand	Role
2023	Planet Fitness	National host
2023	Kia (NBA All‑Star Weekend)	Comedy host
2022	Kia (NBA All‑Star Weekend)	Comedy host

== Personal life ==
Mulrooney resides in Los Angeles, where he has trained with acting coaches Aaron Speiser and Kay Aston at The Screen Acting Studio. He creates comedic content on Instagram. Mulrooney identifies as queer and pansexual.
