= Morgan McMichaels =

Scottish-American drag queen (born 1981)

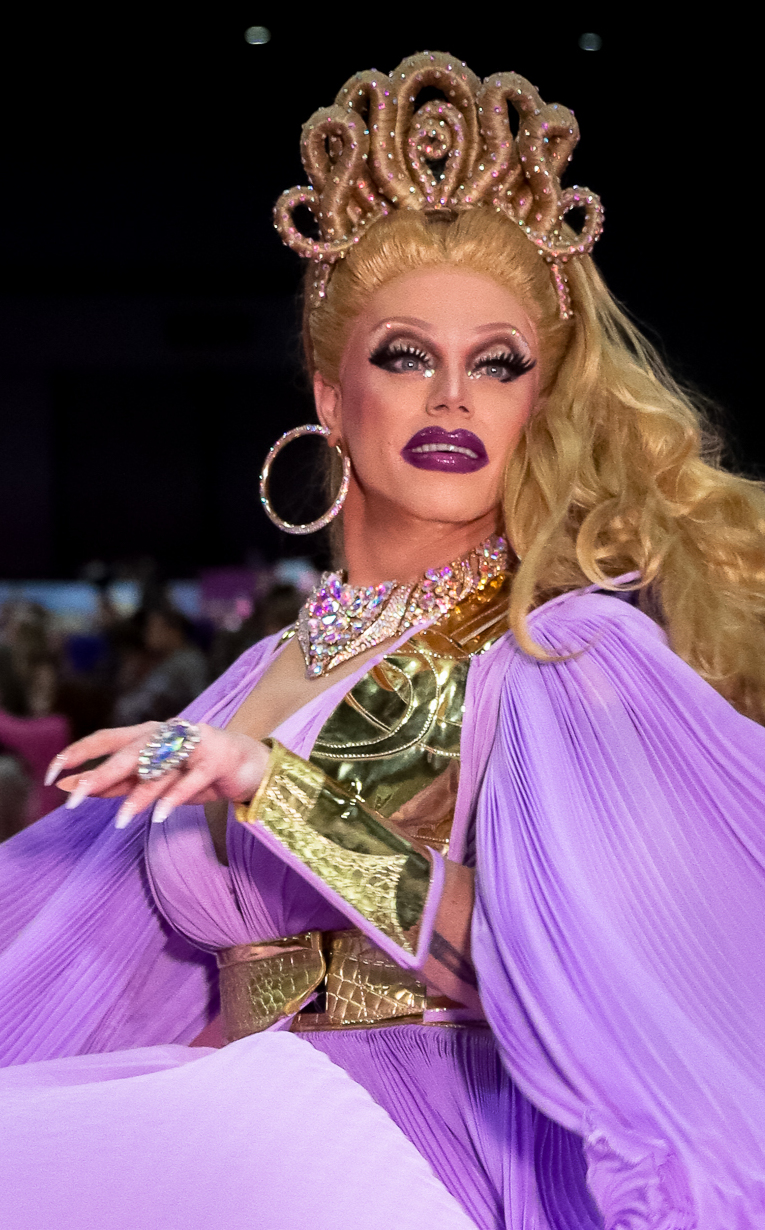
- Morgan McMichaels at RuPaul's DragCon LA, 2023
- Born: Thomas White; May 28, 1981 (age 45); Alexandria, Scotland, UK
- Education: University of the West of Scotland
- Occupation: Drag performer
- Years active: 2001–present
- Known for: RuPaul's Drag Race (season 2); RuPaul's Drag Race All Stars (season 3)
- Website: Official website

Morgan McMichaels (born May 28, 1981) is the stage name of Scottish-American drag performer Thomas White, best known for appearing on RuPaul's Drag Race, from the second season of the original reality television competition, to the third and eleventh seasons of the All-Stars spinoff.

== Early life ==
White was born in 1981 in Alexandria, Scotland to a Scottish father and an American mother, and spent parts of his childhood in both Scotland and the United States. White attended primary school in the US before returning to West Dunbartonshire as a teenager, attending Our Lady and St Patrick's High School then studying biochemistry and immunology at the University of the West of Scotland, before leaving at the age of 18 for California, where he decided to pursue a stage career instead of returning to Scotland. Having been introduced to drag through the character Lily Savage, McMichaels stated his own alter ego wouldn't have emerged if he had stayed at university. White's stage name pays homage to Morgan le Fay, a figure of Arthurian legend that links to his own Scottish heritage, with the surname McMichaels originating from his drag mother, Chad Michaels, who appeared on the 4th season of RuPaul's Drag Race and 1st season of RuPaul's Drag Race: All Stars, winning the latter, and his drag father, Adam Magee.

== Career ==
=== RuPaul's Drag Race ===
McMichaels joined the cast of the second season of RuPaul's Drag Race in 2010. She was eliminated after losing a lip sync performance battle to contestant Sahara Davenport, placing eighth out of twelve.

McMichaels later went on to participate in the third season of RuPaul's Drag Race: All Stars, where she was eliminated first by BenDeLaCreme for saying she would send home the best competitors if she stayed. This placed her 10th in the season. She returned in the 6th episode among five eliminated queens (Thorgy Thor, Milk, Chi Chi Devayne and Aja) and was selected to be brought back by BenDeLaCreme, ultimately placing 5th.

In April 2026, McMichaels was confirmed to be competing on the eleventh season of All Stars in the first bracket. Her season 2 castmate Mystique Summers Madison and All Stars season 3 castmate Kennedy Davenport are also competing on the season.

=== After Drag Race ===
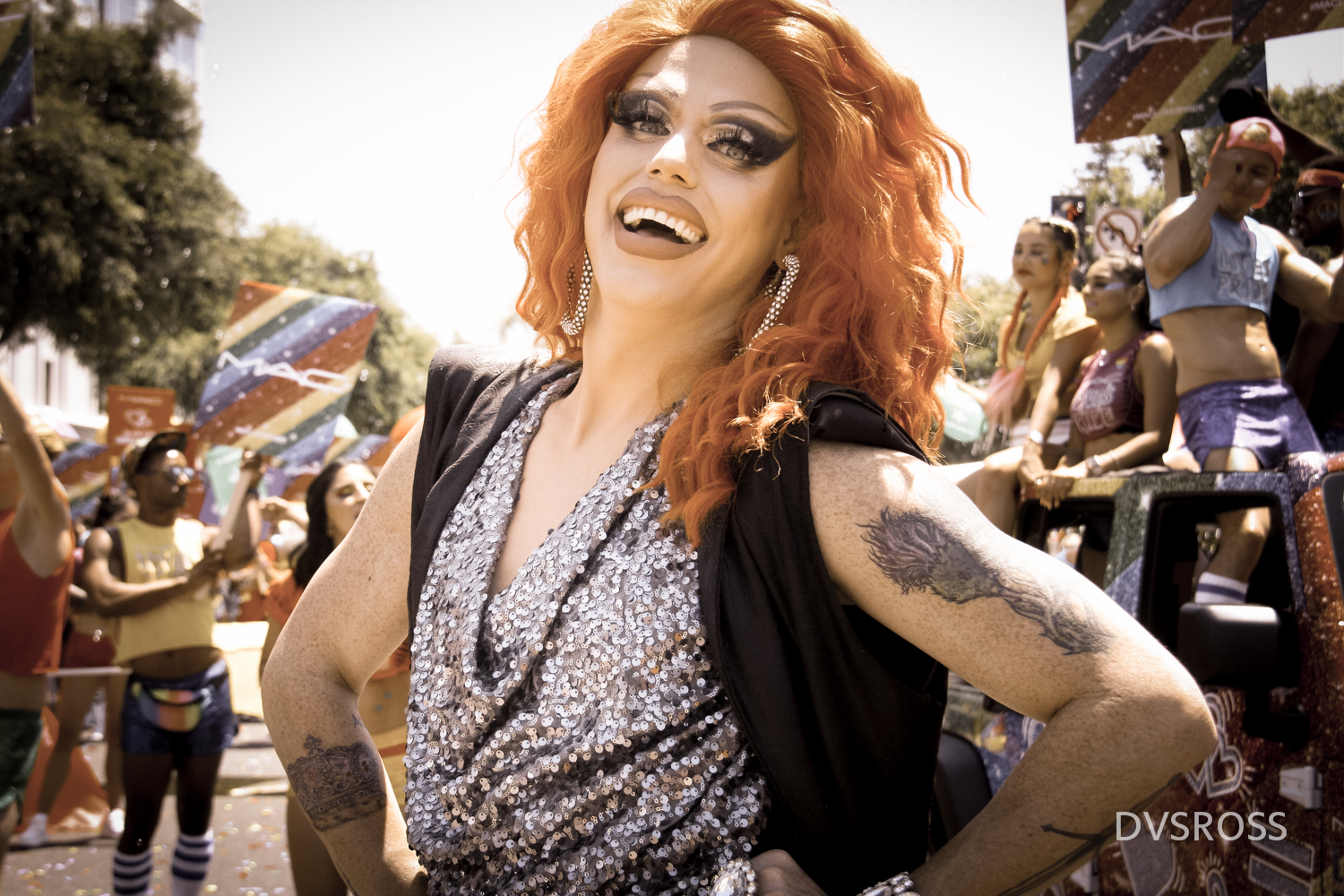
Morgan McMichaels in 2019

McMichaels, along with fellow contestants Raven, Jujubee, Pandora Boxx, Nina Flowers, Shannel and Tammie Brown appeared in RuPaul's Drag U, a spinoff Logo series in 2010, where she appeared as a "professor" for three episodes. She remained in the cast on the second season of Drag U, which made its season premiere on 20 June 2011, and was a professor for two more episodes. She returned again for one episode in the third season of Drag U in 2012.

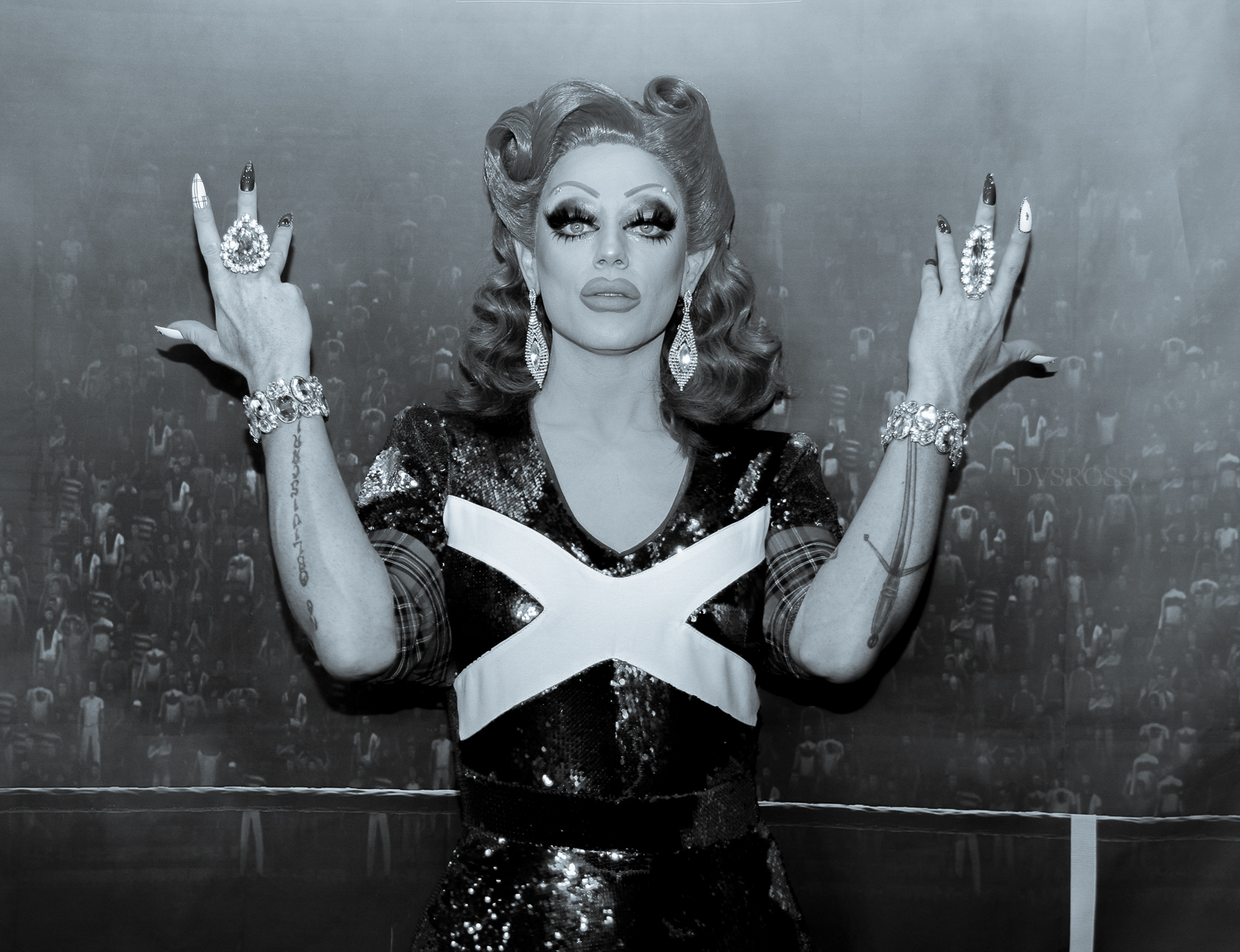
Morgan McMichaels at RuPaul's DragCon LA in 2019

Other than Drag Race related shows, McMichaels was featured in the music video for "S&M" by Barbadian singer Rihanna in 2011. On 11 April 2013, McMichaels made a guest appearance on Tabatha Takes Over at the VIP Nightclub in Riverside, California where McMichaels performed a lip sync as Tabatha. Morgan was also featured in Lady Gaga's lyric video of "Applause" along with other drag queens. She hosted an internet show for WOWPresents called Living For The Lip Sync where she talks about lip sync fan-recorded performances by Drag Race alumni. It premiered to YouTube on September 4, 2014, and ended on January 22, 2015. She made an appearance on Entertainment Tonight to talk about All Stars 3 in 2018. She was featured with Laganja Estranja, Farrah Moan and Jaidynn Diore-Fierce on season 13 of Germany's Next Topmodel as a guest for the episode 14 challenge. He appeared in a music video for Lizzo's song "Juice" on April 17, 2019. She was a backup dancer for Nico Tortorella in an episode of Lip Sync Battle in 2019.

In Episode 4 of All Stars 5, she made a guest appearance as a "Lip Sync Assassin", where she lip-synced against Miz Cracker.

She is a playable character in the official Drag Race mobile game, RuPaul's Drag Race Superstar.

== Music ==
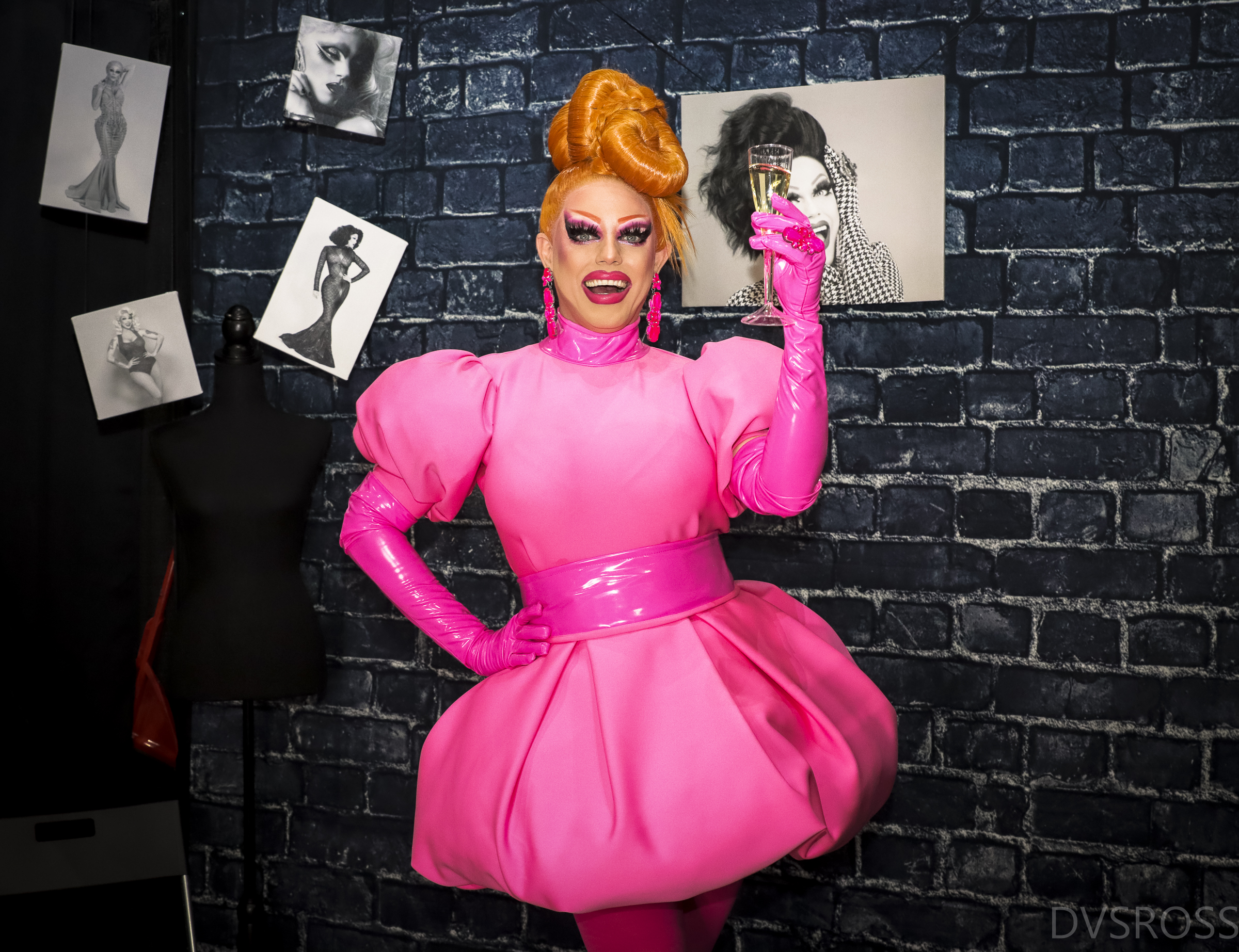
Morgan McMichaels at RuPaul's DragCon LA in 2022

McMichaels released her first single, "Why You Mad Tho?" on February 3, 2018, with the remix by producer Drew G Rdr. McMichaels performed the single live on the Drag Race: All Stars 3 premiere episode talent show. She released a second single, "Yazz Bitch" on May 11, 2018.

== Personal life ==
In October 2018, White broke his hand in self-defense after a physical altercation with a man who proclaimed to be a Nazi.

== Filmography ==
=== Television ===
Year	Title	Role	Notes
2010	RuPaul's Drag Race	Contestant	Season 2; 8th place
2010	RuPaul's Drag Race: Untucked	Contestant	Season 1
2010–12	RuPaul's Drag U	Mentor	Season 1–3, 5 episodes
2013	Tabatha Takes Over	Herself	Tabatha impersonator
2018	RuPaul's Drag Race All Stars	Contestant	Season 3; 5th place
2018	Germany's Next Top Model	Guest	1 episode
2019	Lip Sync Battle	Backup dancer	
2020	RuPaul's Drag Race All Stars	Lipsync Assassin	Season 5, 1 episode
2022	RuPaul's Secret Celebrity Drag Race	Herself	Guest
2023	Drag Me to Dinner	Contestant	1 episode; Hulu original
2026	RuPaul's Drag Race All Stars	Contestant	Season 11

=== Film ===
Year	Title	Role
2019	Trixie Mattel: Moving Parts	Herself
2021	The Bitch Who Stole Christmas	Lanette

=== Music videos ===
Year	Title	Artist
2011	"S&M"	Rihanna
2013	"Applause"	Lady Gaga
2019	"Juice"	Lizzo
2019	"All The Queen's Horses"	Shakespears Sister
2020	"Nerves of Steel"	Erasure

=== Web series ===
Year	Title	Role	Note	Ref.
2013	Transformations	Herself	Guest	
2014–15	Living For The Lip Sync	Herself	Host	
2014	Bestie$ For Ca$h	Herself	Guest	
2015	Hey Qween!	Herself	Guest	
2015	Drag Queens React	Herself	Guest	
2018	The Pit Stop	Herself	Guest	
2018	Whatcha Packin	Herself	Guest	
2017-2019	Fashion Photo RuView	Herself	Guest Co-host	
2019	Try Guys	Herself	Episode: "The Try Guys Lip Sync Battle Drag Queens"	
2019	Follow Me	Herself	Episode: "Mariah Balenciaga"	
2022	Binge Queens	Herself	Recurring	

== Discography ==
=== Singles ===
Year	Title
2018	Why You Mad Tho?
2018	Yazz Bitch
2019	Queen (Divine & Moloy)
2020	Ass Like Mine
2023	URDUM URDUM

==== Featured singles ====
Title	Year	Album
"Sitting on a Secret" (RuPaul featuring Aja, Chi Chi DeVayne, Milk, Morgan McMichaels, & Thorgy Thor)	2018	Non-album single
