= Stop! That! Train! =

2026 film by Adam Shankman

- Theatrical release poster
- Directed by: Adam Shankman
- Written by: Christina Friel; Connor Wright
- Produced by: Fenton Bailey; Randy Barbato; Tom Campbell; RuPaul Charles; Adam Shankman
- Starring: RuPaul Charles; Ginger Minj; Jujubee
- Cinematography: Luka Bazeli
- Edited by: Joshua Kirchmer
- Music by: Jacques Brautbar
- Production company: World of Wonder
- Distributed by: Bleecker Street (United States and Canada); Universal Pictures (International)
- Release dates: May 28, 2026 (Newfest); June 12, 2026 (United States)
- Running time: 90 minutes
- Country: United States
- Language: English
- Budget: $12.8 million
- Box office: $4.5 million

Stop! That! Train! is a 2026 American action comedy disaster film directed and produced by Adam Shankman, written by Christina Friel and Connor Wright. It is co-produced by Unapologetic Projects and World of Wonder. This film features an ensemble cast including drag performers Ginger Minj, Jujubee, and RuPaul Charles. It is about two train stewardesses who work to stop a disaster from happening on a train, due to a storm.

The film was theatrically released in the United States on June 12, 2026, by Bleecker Street. It received mixed reviews from critics and grossed $4 million on a $12.8 million budget.

== Plot ==
Friends and train stewardesses Tess and DeeDee find themselves out of a job when their train line, the Stank Rail, is discontinued. They sneak onto the high-class Glamazonian Express disguised as stewardesses, where they meet Amber, Alli, and Ayshleiygh, who constantly upstage them.

Meanwhile, at the United States Train Command Center, employee Donna Dusk discovers that the Glamazonian Express is headed straight towards a massive storm, dubbed "Stormaganza". In the midst of the chaos, the Glamazonian Express loses their brakes; the train is headed for Florida and is expected to crash into a nuclear site situated between a shelter for abandoned dogs and the home of Laurie Metcalf. President Judy Gagwell receives the news and gives a statement, but suddenly begins to experience traumatic flashbacks of an incident where she accidentally ran over a little girl during her time in the discontinued United States Rail Force.

When the conductor of the Glamazonian Express is left incapacitated due to a scorpion sting, DeeDee and co-conductor Cal are left to get the train back on track, though they often find themselves distracted due to their growing attraction to one another. Due to the storm, they are forced to redirect the train into a haunted tunnel. Meanwhile, Tess finds herself assimilating well into the first-class culture, outshining and eventually replacing Amber. DeeDee is furious that Tess has abandoned her for the Glamazonian Express girls, while Tess angrily counters that DeeDee has been holding her back, causing a rift in the girls' friendship. After the tunnel incident, President Gagwell finds her approval ratings rapidly declining and steps down. Cal is accidentally sucked out of the train and falls down a ravine. Amber discovers the truth about Tess and DeeDee's past with Stank Rail and exposes them to the passengers. Donna is fired for the expected disaster and runs into Gagwell at a bar. After comiserating over their respective failures, a newly inspired Donna encourages Gagwell to take control of their fates and save the train.

President Gagwell boards the train while Dusk takes control of the command center. After Tess and DeeDee reconcile, they work together with Gagwell to eject the engine and stop the train before it runs into the Make-A-Wish foundation field trip to the Florida station. Afterwards, Cal is revealed to be alive; he and DeeDee profess their love to one another and kiss. Tess, DeeDee, and Donna are regarded as heroes by the media while President Gagwell returns to her position.

== Cast ==
- Ginger Minj as Tess
- Jujubee as DeeDee
- Brooke Lynn Hytes as Amber
- Latrice Royale as Barbra
- Marty Lauter (Note: Marcia Marcia Marcia is credited as Marty Lauter in the film.) as Alli
- Monét X Change as Protester
- Symone as Ayshleiygh
- RuPaul Charles as President Judy Gagwell
- Sarah Michelle Gellar as Famous Actress
- Nicole Richie as Workaholic
- Raven-Symoné as Shayna Gefilte Manischewitz, the Florida Reporter
- Michelle Visage as Reporter 1
- Chris Parnell as Conductor Davenport
- Jesse Tyler Ferguson as Business Person
- Charo as Sexy Traffic Controller
- Brian Jordan Alvarez as Co-Conductor Cal
- Natasha Leggero as Person on Phone
- Drew Droege as Rich Gay
- Joel McHale as Male Passenger 2
- Rachel Bloom as Donna Dusk
- Evan Mulrooney as Chet
- Guy Branum as Train Traffic Controller
- Daniel Franzese as Dishevelled Man
- Riki Lindhome as Reporter 2
- Mayan Lopez as Pregnant Woman
- Missi Pyle as Horny Divorcee
- Jerry O'Connell as Bickering Husband
- June Diane Raphael as Chic Woman
- Lisa Rinna as Sceney Celebrity
- Jai Rodriguez as Reporter 3
- Matt Rogers as Press Secretary
- Paul Scheer as Male Passenger 1
- Nicole Sullivan as Bickering Wife
- Angeria Paris VanMicheals as Amelia

== Production ==
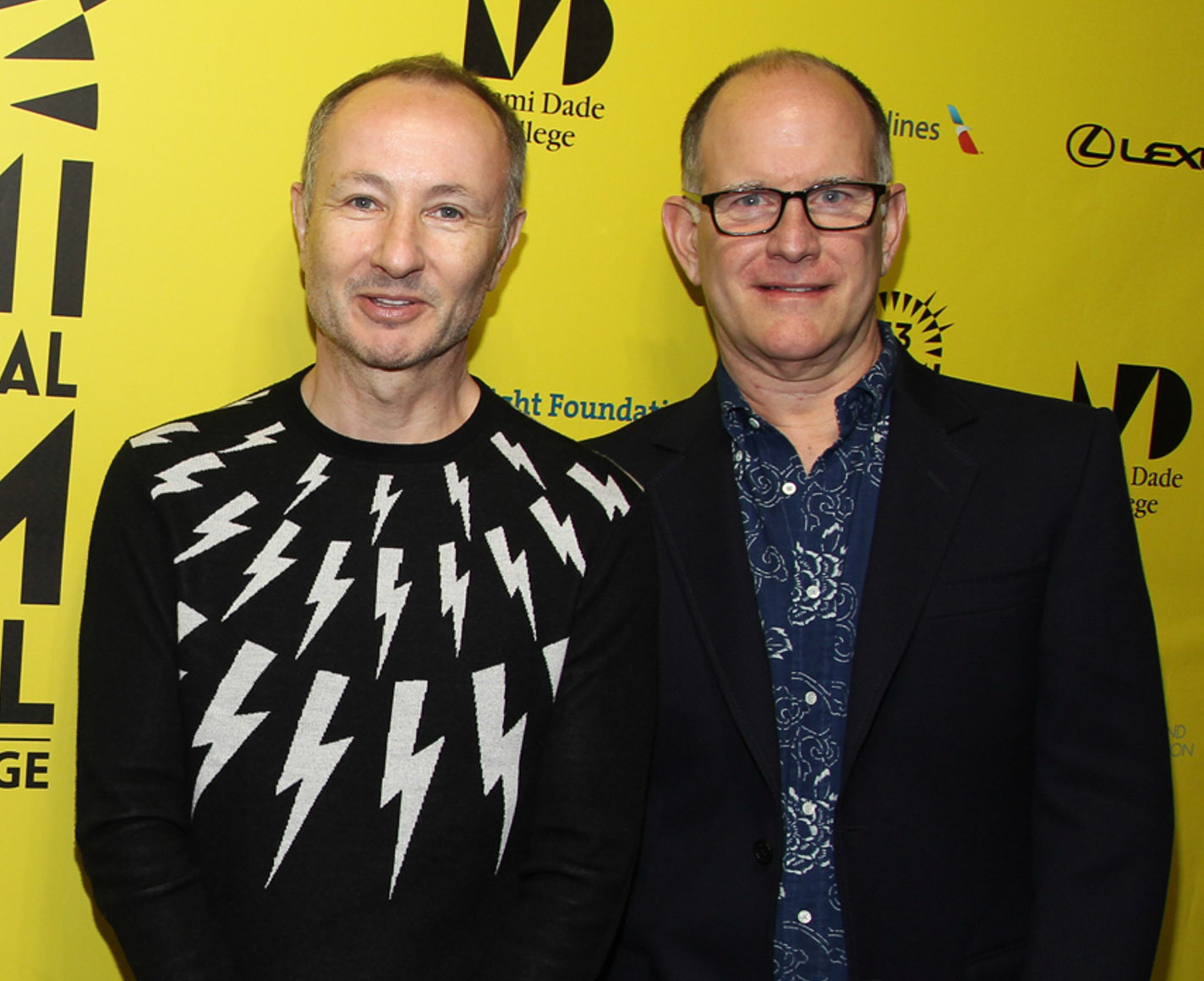
Randy Barbato and Fenton Bailey in 2016

A press release was announced from the California Film Commission, informing that an undisclosed project involving drag perfomers had been awarded with $1.7 million in tax incentives in March 2025.

In June 2025, Fenton Bailey and Randy Barbato, the co-founders of World of Wonder, confirmed in a conversation with Variety that the then-untitled film was in pre-production. Bailey also mentioned it would be set within the Drag Race franchise, but was unclear if it was going to be formatted into a documentary or fictional film.

On September 4, Deadline Hollywood reported that the project, an action comedy film starring RuPaul, had begun production, with Adam Shankman directing from a script by Christina Friel and Connor Wright. In October 2025, the rest of the cast was revealed, consisting of Ginger Minj, Jujubee, Brooke Lynn Hytes, Latrice Royale, Marcia Marcia Marcia (credited as Marty Lauter), Monét X Change, and Symone. In March 2026, Sarah Michelle Gellar, Nicole Richie, Raven-Symoné, Michelle Visage, Chris Parnell, Jesse Tyler Ferguson, Charo, Brian Jordan Alvarez, Natasha Leggero, Drew Droege, and Joel McHale were revealed to have joined the cast.

On March 27, Jacques Brautbar was hired to compose the score.

Shankman has said that the film was shot in 19 days, and the hardest cast member to schedule around was RuPaul because of her Drag Race commitments: "The amount of work to be able to get those days with Ru was hard." All of the Oval Office scenes, totaling nine-and-a-half pages of script, were shot in one day, three weeks before regular production began to allow the film to qualify for California tax credits. Though most of the lead cast are drag queens, Shankman told them to "act like [they're] in a drama" and that their characters were not drag queens.

In early June, significant speculation arose among fans that generative AI had been used in the film's visual effects. Its VFX partner, Acme AI & FX, has touted its ability to shorten production schedules and reduce budgets using a "gray box" soundstage, where the location imagery is generated using AI. On June 2, director Shankman released a statement via Instagram denying that any of the film's shots were conceived using AI. Some commentators called Shankman's wording "intentionally vague". A source familiar with production also told Variety that Acme was contracted exclusively for visual effects work, and any AI usage was "limited to background workflow processes" and would not appear on screen. On June 10, in an interview with Xtra Magazine, Shankman walked back his previous statement, admitting that some shots of the train and its windows were AI-generated.

== Release ==
Bleecker Street acquired North American distribution rights to the film in September 2025. In October, the film's title was revealed to be Stop! That! Train!, with Universal Pictures Content Group announced as the international distributor. Initially planned for release in May, the United States release was moved to June 12, 2026. The film premiered at the Newfest on May 28.

== Reception ==
On the review aggregator website Rotten Tomatoes, 85% of 54 critics' reviews are positive, with an average rating of 6.3/10. The website's consensus reads: "A propulsive farce that stays on the tracks thanks to Ginger Minj and Jujubee's heartfelt rapport, Stop! That! Train! chugs along splendidly with its daffy humor and sweet celebration of drag culture." Metacritic, which uses a weighted average, assigned the film a score of 59 out of 100, based on 13 critics, indicating "mixed or average" reviews.

Deadline labelled the film an homage to David Zucker's campy disaster films of the 1980s, Airplane! and The Naked Gun: From the Files of Police Squad!, where the format seemed fresh and inventive back then but appears stale in the modern movie landscape.

=== Award nominations ===
Accolades received by Stop! That! Train!
| Award | Date of ceremony | Category | Recipient(s) | Result | Ref(s). |
|---|---|---|---|---|---|
| Queerties Awards | March 10, 2026 | Next Big Thing | Stop! That! Train! | Nominated | |
