= Sahara Davenport =

American drag queen (1984–2012)

- Davenport in 2009
- Born: Antoine Ashley; December 17, 1984; Dallas, Texas, U.S.
- Died: October 1, 2012 (aged 27); Baltimore, Maryland, U.S.
- Education: Southern Methodist University (BFA)
- Occupations: Drag queen, dancer, make-up artist
- Partner: Manila Luzon (2006–2012; Ashley's death)

Antoine Ashley (December 17, 1984 – October 1, 2012), better known by the name Sahara Davenport, was an American drag queen, singer, reality television personality, and classically trained dancer. Davenport was best known as a contestant on the second season of RuPaul's Drag Race.

== RuPaul's Drag Race ==
Davenport appeared on the second season of RuPaul's Drag Race in 2010. He was pegged as "the dancer" when in the first episode he had to "lip-sync for her life" against Shangela, his former classmate at Southern Methodist University (where he earned a BFA in dance at the Meadows School of the Arts). In the second episode, Davenport became a team leader when he and Pandora Boxx won the mini challenge. Sahara won the second episode elimination challenge by leading his team to earn the most money by pole dancing and selling Cherry Pie gift certificates on the streets of Los Angeles. In the fourth episode, Davenport gave a humorous impersonation of Whitney Houston in the "Snatch Game" challenge. In the Wedding Dress episode, he was placed in the bottom two again, but remained safe with his lip sync performance to Martha Wash's "Carry On". Sahara was eliminated in the sixth episode for not conveying enough of a "rock 'n' roll" attitude and being too much of a lady. The first season of RuPaul's Drag Race All Stars aired following his death, and featured his partner, Manila Luzon, as a contestant. The first episode was dedicated to his memory.

Davenport's drag sister Kennedy Davenport appeared on season 7 of RuPaul's Drag Race and on season 3 of RuPaul's Drag Race All Stars, where he placed as runner-up. His drag niece, Honey Davenport, placed 13th on the 11th season of Drag Race.

== Music ==
In 2011, Davenport released his second single "Go Off". A remix EP was later released on January 31, 2012, and featured a remix by Manny Lehman. "Go Off" debuted at number fifty on the Billboard Hot Dance Club Songs, before peaking at number thirty five. The music video for "Go Off" features cameos by Drag Race contestants Manila Luzon and Jiggly Caliente.

== Personal life and death ==
Davenport was born to Angela Ashley Reddish on December 17, 1984. Sahara Davenport resided in New York City with his boyfriend Karl Westerberg, a fellow drag queen who goes by the stage name Manila Luzon and who was a contestant on the third season of RuPaul's Drag Race.

During his time on RuPaul's Drag Race, Davenport discussed his use of "designer drugs", such as ketamine, and how his drag mother had to help him out of addiction. Davenport died of heart failure at Johns Hopkins Hospital in Baltimore on October 1, 2012, at age 27.

== Discography ==
=== Singles ===
Title	Year	Peak Chart Position
Title	Year	U.S. Dance
"Pump with Me"	2010	–
"Go Off"	2011	35

== See also ==
- LGBT culture in New York City
- List of LGBT people from New York City
- NYC Pride March
