= RuPaul's Drag Race season 2 =

2010 season of RuPaul's Drag Race

RuPaul's Drag Race
- Season 2
- Promotional poster for season two
- Hosted by: RuPaul
- Judges: RuPaul; Santino Rice; Merle Ginsberg
- No. of contestants: 12
- Winner: Tyra Sanchez
- Runner-up: Raven
- Miss Congeniality: Pandora Boxx
- Companion show: RuPaul's Drag Race: Untucked!
- No. of episodes: 12

Release
- Original network: Logo TV
- Original release: February 1 – April 26, 2010

Season chronology
- ← Previous; Season 1 Next → Season 3

The second season of RuPaul's Drag Race premiered on February 1, 2010, and aired its final episode on April 26 of the same year. On May 1, 2009, the casting website for the series opened, allowing prospective contestants to create user profiles and upload videos of themselves to be voted on by viewers; the applicant collecting the most votes being invited to become a contestant of the second season. At the end of the online casting period, Jessica Wild had collected the most votes and was announced as being a season two contestant. Filming took place during the summer of 2009.

For season two, the number of contestants was increased from nine to twelve, and the prizes were slightly modified: a lifetime supply of NYX Cosmetics and be the face of nyxcosmetics.com, an exclusive one year public relations contract with LGBT firm Project Publicity, be featured an LA Eyeworks campaign, join the Logo Drag Race tour, and a cash prize of $25,000. A new tradition of writing a farewell message, in lipstick on their workstation mirror, was started by Shangela, the first eliminated queen of the season. Each week's episode is followed by a behind-the-scenes show, RuPaul's Drag Race Untucked.

The theme song playing during the runway and the end credits every episode is the Gomi and RasJek remix of "Jealous of My Boogie" from RuPaul's album Champion. On December 6, 2011, Amazon.com released this season on DVD via their CreateSpace program.

The winner of the second season of RuPaul's Drag Race was Tyra Sanchez, with Raven placing as runner-up.

Sahara Davenport died of heart failure at Johns Hopkins Hospital in Baltimore on October 1, 2012, at age 27. She is the first contestant from RuPaul's Drag Race to pass away.

== Contestants ==
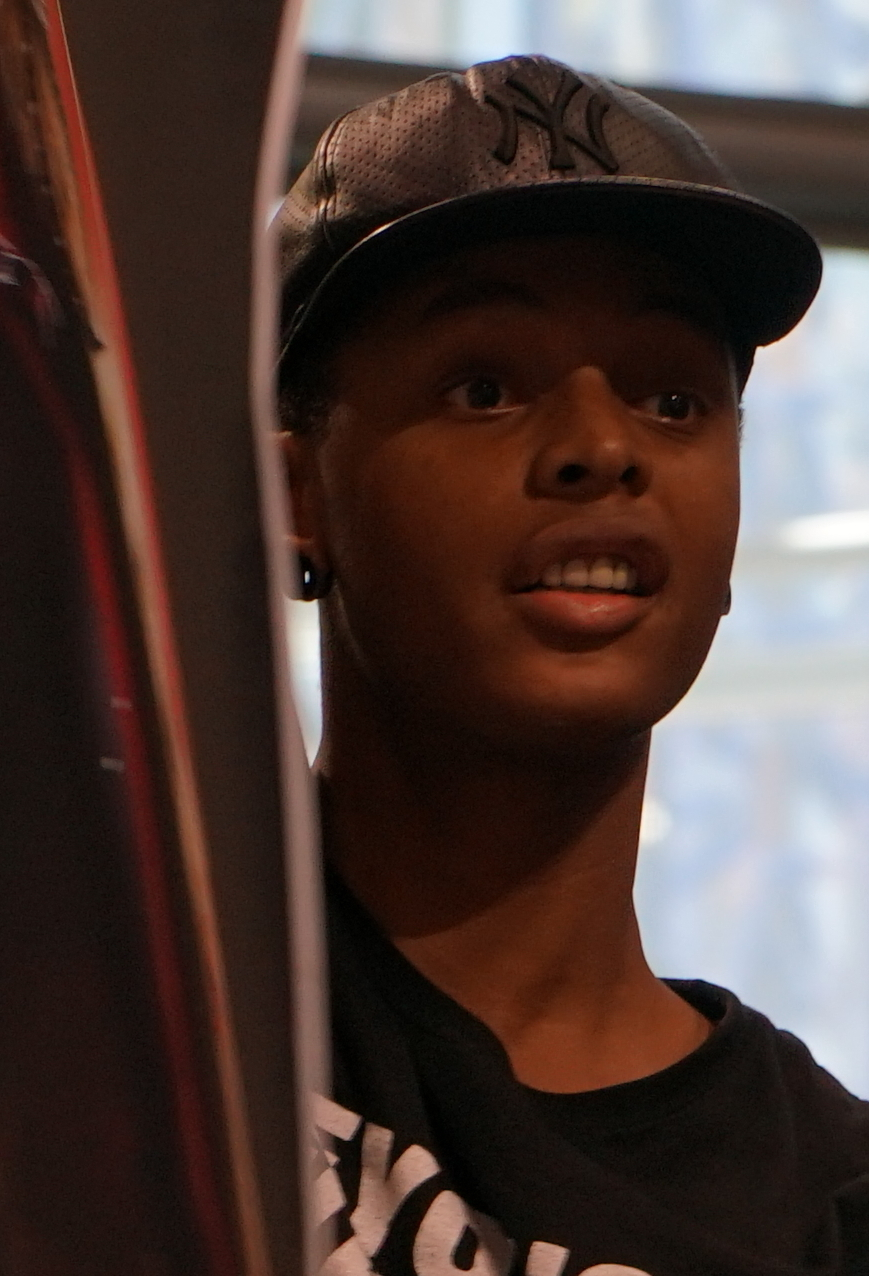
The winner, Tyra Sanchez.

Ages, names, and cities stated are at time of filming.

Contestants of RuPaul's Drag Race season 2 and their backgrounds
Contestant	Age	Hometown	Outcome
Tyra Sanchez	21	Orlando, Florida	Winner
Raven	30	Riverside, California	Runner-up
Jujubee	25	Boston, Massachusetts	3rd place
Tatianna	21	Falls Church, Virginia	4th place
Pandora Boxx	37	Rochester, New York	5th place (Note: Pandora Boxx was voted Miss Congeniality by the viewers.)
Jessica Wild	29	San Juan, Puerto Rico	6th place
Sahara Davenport	25	New York City, New York	7th place
Morgan McMichaels	28	Mira Loma, California	8th place
Sonique (Note: Now Kylie Sonique Love, she was referred to as Sonique on the show.)	26	Atlanta, Georgia	9th place
Mystique Summers Madison	25	Bedford, Texas	10th place
Nicole Paige Brooks	36	Atlanta, Georgia	11th place
Shangela Laquifa Wadley	28	Paris, Texas	12th place

== Future appearances ==
Raven, Jujubee and Pandora Boxx returned to compete in 1st season of, Rupaul's Drag Race All Stars season 1 where Pandora placed 11th/12th place alongside Mimi Imfurst, while Jujubee placed 3rd/4th alongside Shannel and Raven was Runner-Up.

Shangela returned to Rupaul's Drag Race season 3 and Rupaul's Drag Race All-Stars season 3 where she placed 6th and 3rd/4th alongside Bebe Zahara Benet. Morgan McMichaels also competed in the 3rd season of Rupaul's Drag Race All-Stars season 3 where she placed 5th.

Sonique returned to Rupaul's Drag Race All-Stars season 6 under her current stage name where she would go on to win.

== Contestant progress ==
Legend:

Tyra Sanchez won RuPaul's Drag Race season 2.
Raven was the runner-up.
Pandora Boxx was voted Miss Congeniality (Miss C) by the viewers.
WIN indicates that the contestant won the challenge.
SAFE indicates that the contestant was declared safe by the judges.
IMM (Immunity) indicates that the contestant was immune for the episode.
BTM (Bottom) indicates that the contestant was up for elimination.
ELIM (Eliminated) indicates that the contestant was eliminated.
Guest indicates that the contestant returned as a guest.

Contestants progress with placements in each episode
Contestant	Episode										
Contestant	1	2	3	4	5	6	7	8	9	11	12
Tyra Sanchez	SAFE	SAFE	WIN	IMM	WIN	IMM	SAFE	SAFE	WIN	Winner	Guest
Raven	SAFE	BTM	BTM	SAFE	SAFE	SAFE	WIN	WIN	SAFE	Runner-up	Guest
Jujubee	SAFE	SAFE	SAFE	SAFE	SAFE	BTM	SAFE	BTM	BTM	Eliminated	Guest
Tatianna	SAFE	SAFE	SAFE	WIN	IMM	SAFE	BTM	SAFE	ELIM		Guest
Pandora Boxx	SAFE	SAFE	SAFE	SAFE	SAFE	SAFE	SAFE	ELIM			Miss C
Jessica Wild	SAFE	SAFE	SAFE	SAFE	SAFE	WIN	ELIM				Guest
Sahara Davenport	BTM	WIN	IMM	SAFE	BTM	ELIM					Guest
Morgan McMichaels	WIN	IMM	SAFE	BTM	ELIM						Guest
Sonique	SAFE	SAFE	SAFE	ELIM							Guest
Mystique Summers Madison	SAFE	SAFE	ELIM								Guest
Nicole Paige Brooks	SAFE	ELIM									Guest
Shangela Laquifa Wadley	ELIM										Guest

== Lip syncs ==
Legend:

The contestant won the Lip Sync for the Crown and was declared the winner of the season.
The contestant was eliminated after their first time in the bottom.
The contestant was eliminated after their second time in the bottom.
The contestant was eliminated after their third time in the bottom.

Episode	Contestants			Song	Eliminated
1	Sahara Davenport	vs.	Shangela Laquifa Wadley	"Cover Girl (Put the Bass in Your Walk)" (RuPaul)	Shangela Laquifa Wadley
2	Nicole Paige Brooks	vs.	Raven	"My Lovin' (You're Never Gonna Get It)" (En Vogue)	Nicole Paige Brooks
3	Mystique Summers Madison	vs.	Raven	"I Hear You Knocking" (Wynonna Judd)	Mystique Summers Madison
4	Morgan McMichaels	vs.	Sonique	"Two of Hearts" (Stacey Q)	Sonique
5	Morgan McMichaels	vs.	Sahara Davenport	"Carry On" (Martha Wash)	Morgan McMichaels
6	Jujubee	vs.	Sahara Davenport	"Black Velvet" (Alannah Myles)	Sahara Davenport
7	Jessica Wild	vs.	Tatianna	"He's the Greatest Dancer" (Sister Sledge)	Jessica Wild
8	Jujubee	vs.	Pandora Boxx	"Shake Your Love" (Debbie Gibson)	Pandora Boxx
9	Jujubee	vs.	Tatianna	"Something He Can Feel" (Aretha Franklin)	Tatianna
Episode	Contestants			Song	Winner
11	Raven	vs.	Tyra Sanchez	"Jealous of My Boogie (Gomi and RasJek Edit)" (RuPaul)	Tyra Sanchez

== Guest judges ==
Listed in chronological order:

- Mike Ruiz, photographer
- Kathy Griffin, comedian
- Kim Coles, actress and comedian
- Dita Von Teese, burlesque performer
- Kathy Najimy, actress
- Tanya Tucker, singer
- Lisa Rinna, actress and television personality
- Niecy Nash, comedian, actress, and model
- Mathu Andersen, make-up artist and photographer
- Martha Wash, singer-songwriter
- Henry Rollins, musician, actor, and comedian
- Terri Nunn, singer and actress
- Gigi Levangie, novelist, screenwriter, and producer
- Jackie Collins, novelist
- Debbie Reynolds, actress and singer
- Cloris Leachman, actress and comedian
- Toni Ko, CEO of NYX Cosmetics
- Tatum O'Neal, actress and author
- Marissa Jaret Winokur, actress

== Episodes ==
No. overall	No. in season	Title	Original release date
10	1	"Gone with the Window"	February 1, 2010
Twelve new queens enter the workroom. For the first mini-challenge, the queens do a Gone with the Wind inspired photoshoot. Raven wins the mini-challenge. For the main challenge, the queens create an outfit made from curtains and home furnishings. On the runway, Morgan McMichaels, Pandora Boxx and Tyra Sanchez receive positive critiques, with Morgan McMichaels winning the challenge. Mystique Summers Madison, Sahara Davenport and Shangela Laquifa Wadley receive negative critiques, with Mystique Summers Madison being safe. Sahara Davenport and Shangela Laquifa Wadley lip-sync to "Cover Girl (Put the Bass in Your Walk)" by RuPaul. Sahara Davenport wins the lip-sync and Shangela Laquifa Wadley sashays away.: Guest Judges: Mike Ruiz and Kathy Griffin; Mini-Challenge: Gone with the Wind inspired photoshoot; Mini-Challenge Winner: Raven; Main Challenge: Create an outfit made from curtains and home furnishings; Challenge Winner: Morgan McMichaels; Challenge Prize: A photo spread for Interior Illusions featured in Lux Magazine; Bottom Two: Sahara Davenport and Shangela Laquifa Wadley; Lip-Sync Song: "Cover Girl (Put the Bass in Your Walk)" by RuPaul; Eliminated: Shangela Laquifa Wadley; Farewell Message: "Love you all. Turn it out... Shangela "DJ""
11	2	"Starrbootylicious"	February 8, 2010
For this week's mini-challenge, the queens pair up and turn a mini-Ru doll from a lady to a tramp. Pandora Boxx and Sahara Davenport win the mini-challenge. For the main challenge, the queens team up and compete to earn the most cast performing burlesque and selling gift certificates.: Team Pandora Boxx: Morgan McMichaels, Nicole Paige Brooks, Pandora Boxx, Raven, Sonique and Tatianna; Team Sahara Davenport: Jessica Wild, Jujubee, Mystique Summers Madison, Sahara Davenport and Tyra Sanchez; On the runway, category is High Class Drag. Team Sahara Davenport is the winning team, with Sahara Davenport winning the challenge. Team Pandora Boxx is the losing team. Nicole Paige Brooks, Raven and Sonique receive negative critiques, with Sonique being safe. Nicole Paige Brooks and Raven lip-sync to "My Lovin' (You're Never Gonna Get It)" by En Vogue. Raven wins the lip-sync and Nicole Paige Brooks sashays away.: Guest Judges: Kim Coles and Dita Von Teese; Mini-Challenge: In pairs, turn a mini-Ru doll from a lady to a tramp; Mini-Challenge Winners: Pandora Boxx and Sahara Davenport; Main Challenge: In teams, compete to earn the most cash performing burlesque and selling gift certificates; Runway Theme: High Class Drag; Challenge Winner: Sahara Davenport; Challenge Prize: A $1,500 gift certificate to Sequin Queen; Bottom Two: Nicole Paige Brooks and Raven; Lip-Sync Song: "My Lovin' (You're Never Gonna Get It)" by En Vogue; Eliminated: Nicole Paige Brooks; Farewell Message: "Be Safe Bitch N.P. Brooks"
12	3	"Country Queens"	February 15, 2010
For this week's mini-challenge, the queens compete in an eating contest called "Chicken or What?" Morgan McMichaels and Mystique Summers Madison win the mini-challenge. For the main challenge, the queens team up and act as feuding families in a TV commercial for Disco Shortening.: Team Hatfields: Morgan McMichaels, Raven, Sahara Davenport, Sonique and Tyra Sanchez; Team McCoys: Jessica Wild, Jujubee, Mystique Summers Madison, Pandora Boxx and Tatianna; On the runway, category is Country Realness. Jessica Wild, Pandora Boxx and Tyra Sanchez receive positive critiques, with Tyra Sanchez winning the challenge. Mystique Summers Madison and Raven receive negative critiques, and are announced as the bottom two. They lip-sync to "I Hear You Knockin'" by Wynonna Judd. Raven wins the lip-sync and Mystique Summers Madison sashays away.: Guest Judges: Kathy Najimy and Tanya Tucker; Mini-Challenge: Compete in an eating contest called "Chicken or What?"; Mini-Challenge Winners: Morgan McMichaels and Mystique Summers Madison; Main Challenge: In teams, act as feuding families in a TV commercial for Disco Shortening; Runway Theme: Country Realness; Challenge Winner: Tyra Sanchez; Challenge Prize: A collection of designer bags from M. Clifford Designs; Bottom Two: Mystique Summers Madison and Raven; Lip-Sync Song: "I Hear You Knockin'" by Wynonna Judd; Eliminated: Mystique Summers Madison; Farewell Message: "Balls 2 the Walls. Fishes or Bitches. You pick. Mystique."
13	4	"The Snatch Game"	February 22, 2010
For this week's mini-challenge, the queens play a bidding challenge called "The Queen is Right". Raven wins the mini-challenge. For this week's main challenge, the queens play the Snatch Game. Alec Mapa and Phoebe Price star as the celebrity contestants. The cast consisted of: Jessica Wild as RuPaul; Jujubee as Kimora Lee; Morgan McMichaels as Pink; Pandora Boxx as Carol Channing; Raven as Paris Hilton; Sahara Davenport as Whitney Houston; Sonique as Lady Gaga; Tatianna as Britney Spears; Tyra Sanchez as Beyoncé; On the runway, category is Personal Style. Pandora Boxx and Tatianna receive positive critiques, with Tatianna winning the challenge. Jujubee, Morgan McMichaels and Sonique receive negative critiques, with Jujubee being safe. Morgan McMichaels and Sonique lip-sync to "Two of Hearts (song)" by Stacey Q. Morgan McMichaels wins the lip-sync and Sonique sashays away.: Guest Judges: Lisa Rinna and Niecy Nash; Mini-Challenge: "The Queen is Right" bidding challenge; Mini-Challenge Winner: Raven; Main Challenge: Snatch Game; Runway Theme: Personal Style; Challenge Winner: Tatianna; Challenge Prize: A $1,000 shopping spree from Billion Dollar Babes; Bottom Two: Morgan McMichaels and Sonique; Lip-Sync Song: "Two of Hearts (song)" by Stacey Q; Eliminated: Sonique; Farewell Message: "☮❤️ XO Son!que "Trust" "
14	5	"Here Comes the Bride"	March 1, 2010
For this week's mini-challenge, the queens decorate a box in their drag style that includes something borrowed from another queen. Raven wins the mini-challenge. For the main challenge, the queens dress up as the bride and groom in a wedding photoshoot. On the runway, Jessica Wild, Jujubee, Raven and Tyra Sanchez receive positive critiques, with Tyra Sanchez winning the challenge. Morgan McMichaels, Sahara Davenport and Tatianna receive negative critiques, with Tatianna being safe. Morgan McMichaels and Sahara Davenport lip-sync to A five night vacation at the Hyatt in Palm Springs. Sahara Davenport wins the lip-sync and Morgan McMichaels sashays away.: Guest Judges: Mathu Andersen and Martha Wash; Mini-Challenge: Decorate a box in your drag style that includes something borrowed from another queen; Mini-Challenge Winner: Raven; Main Challenge: Dress up as the bride and groom in a wedding photoshoot; Challenge Winner: Tyra Sanchez; Challenge Prize: A five night vacation at the Hyatt in Palm Springs; Bottom Two: Morgan McMichaels and Sahara Davenport; Lip-Sync Song: "Carry On" by Martha Wash; Eliminated: Morgan McMichaels; Farewell Message: "All you have to do is DREAM! Morgan XOXO!"
15	6	"Rocker Chicks"	March 8, 2010
For this week's mini-challenge, the queens give a wig a glam rock makeover. Pandora Boxx wins the mini-challenge. For the main challenge, the queens perform a live rock performance of RuPaul's "Lady Boy". On the runway, Jessica Wild, Pandora Boxx and Raven receive positive critiques, with Jessica Wild winning the challenge. Jujubee, Sahara Davenport and Tyra Sanchez receive negative critiques, with Tyra Sanchez being safe. Jujubee and Sahara Davenport lip-sync to "Black Velvet" by Alannah Myles. Jujubee wins the lip-sync and Sahara Davenport sashays away.: Guest Judges: Henry Rollins and Terri Nunn; Mini-Challenge: Give a wig a glam rock makeover; Mini-Challenge Winner: Pandora Boxx; Main Challenge: Perform a live rock performance of RuPaul's "Lady Boy"; Challenge Winner: Jessica Wild; Challenge Prize: A $1,000 shopping spree; Bottom Two: Jujubee and Sahara Davenport; Lip-Sync Song: "Black Velvet" by Alannah Myles; Eliminated: Sahara Davenport; Farewell Message: "Live, Love and Believe!!! XO. Sahara"
16	7	"Once Upon a Queen"	March 22, 2010
For this week's mini-challenge, the queens read each other to filth. Jujubee wins the mini-challenge. For the main challenge, the queens create and promote a concept for an autobiography.: Jessica Wild - Jessica Wild: Dreams of a Golden Child; Jujubee - Memoirs of a Gay-Sha: Jujubee's Journey, I'm Still Here!; Pandora Boxx - Out of the Boxx: How Drag Saved My Life; Raven - Young, Broke, and Fabulous: The Pursuit of Finding Your Inner Trust Fund; Tatianna - Tati: From Teen Queen to Drag Superstar!; Tyra Sanchez - The Women in Me: A Guide to Letting Go of the Past, Accepting the Present, and Looking Forward to a Better Future; On the runway, Jujubee, Raven and Tyra Sanchez receive positive critiques, with Raven winning the challenge. Jessica Wild, Pandora Boxx and Tatianna receive negative critiques, with Pandora Boxx being safe. Jessica Wild and Tatianna lip-sync to "He's the Greatest Dancer" by Sister Sledge. Tatianna wins the lip-sync and Jessica Wild sashays away.: Guest Judges: Gigi Levangie and Jackie Collins; Mini-Challenge: Reading is Fundamental; Mini-Challenge Winner: Jujubee; Main Challenge: Create and promote a concept for an autobiography; Challenge Winner: Raven; Challenge Prize: A shopping spree at L.A. Eyeworks; Bottom Two: Jessica Wild and Tatianna; Lip-Sync Song: "He's the Greatest Dancer" by Sister Sledge; Eliminated: Jessica Wild; Farewell Message: "I love you girls! Viva P.R.! JW."
17	8	"Golden Gals"	March 29, 2010
For this week's mini-challenge, the queens have to match the season's twelve queens with their baby pictures. Tatianna wins the mini-challenge. For the main challenge, the queens makeover older gay men. On the runway, Raven, Tatianna and Tyra Sanchez receive positive critiques, with Raven winning the challenge. Jujubee and Pandora Boxx receive negative critiques, and are announced as the bottom two. They lip-sync to "Shake Your Love" by Debbie Gibson. Jujubee wins the lip-sync and Pandora Boxx sashays away.: Guest Judges: Debbie Reynolds, Cloris Leachman and Toni Ko; Mini-Challenge: Match the season's twelve queens with their baby pictures; Mini-Challenge Winner: Tatianna; Main Challenge: Makeover older gay men; Challenge Winner: Raven; Challenge Prize: A 4-day 3-night stay and massage at East Canyon Hotel in Palm Springs; Bottom Two: Jujubee and Pandora Boxx; Lip-Sync Song: "Shake Your Love" by Debbie Gibson; Eliminated: Pandora Boxx; Farewell Message: "Lick this Boxx, bitch. XOXO Love you all Pandora Boxx"
18	9	"The Diva Awards"	April 12, 2010
For this week's mini-challenge, the queens style and accessorize one of four identical dresses. Tyra Sanchez wins the mini-challenge. For the main challenge, the queens create three looks for The Diva Awards: Teen Diva, Diva D.C. Press and Diva Hollywood Extravaganza. On the runway, Raven and Tyra Sanchez receive positive critiques, with Tyra Sanchez winning the challenge. Jujubee and Tatianna receive negative critiques, and are announced as the bottom two. They lip-sync to "Something He Can Feel" by Aretha Franklin. Jujubee wins the lip-sync and Tatianna sashays away.: Guest Judges: Tatum O'Neal and Marissa Jaret Winokur; Mini-Challenge: Style and accessorize one of four identical dresses; Mini-Challenge Winner: Tyra Sanchez; Main Challenge: The Diva Awards; Runway Themes: Teen Diva, Diva D.C. Press, and Diva Hollywood Extravaganza; Challenge Winner: Tyra Sanchez; Challenge Prize: A feature photo spread on Paper Magazine; Bottom Two: Jujubee and Tatianna; Lip-Sync Song: "Something He Can Feel" by Aretha Franklin; Eliminated: Tatianna; Farewell Message: "Do you 2 the FULLEST! Love TATI"
19	10	"The Main Event Clip Show"	April 19, 2010
Highlights and outtakes from the second season's first nine episodes. RuPaul reveals some never-before-seen, behind the scenes moments including the queens impersonating each other, the contestants' family relationships and the unseen moments on the main stage. This is followed by a fast-forward flashback recap of the entire season, followed by an up-close and personal look at the final 3. Season 1 contestants Ongina, Shannel, and BeBe Zahara Benet join RuPaul to count down the top ten most unforgettable fits and fashions from the season.
20	11	"Grand Finale"	April 26, 2010
For the final challenge of the season, the queens star in RuPaul's music video "Jealous Of My Boogie (Gomi and RasJek Edit)" and act in a scripted scene with RuPaul. On the runway, Jujubee is eliminated from the competition, leaving Raven and Tyra Sanchez as the top two queens of the season. They lip-sync to "Jealous Of My Boogie (Gomi and RasJek Edit)" by RuPaul. It is revealed that Tyra Sanchez is the winner, leaving Raven as the runner-up.: Main Challenge: Star in RuPaul's music video "Jealous Of My Boogie (Gomi and RasJek Edit)" and act in a scripted scene with RuPaul; Eliminated: Jujubee; Farewell Message: "You are your own worst critic... let go, forgive, & live. Love, Juju B."; Top Two: Raven and Tyra Sanchez; Lip-Sync Song: "Jealous Of My Boogie (Gomi and RasJek Edit)" by RuPaul; Runner-up: Raven; Farewell Message: "Keep your eyes on the stars... you'll never be one - Raven"; Winner of RuPaul's Drag Race Season Two: Tyra Sanchez
21	12	"Reunited"	April 26, 2010
The queens all return for the reunion. Discussions include: Shangela Laquifa Wadley's time after the show, Nicole Paige Brooks feeling disappointed with Raven, Mystique Summers Madison giving up due her mother's safety, Sonique revealing that she is transgender, Morgan McMichael's fight with Mystique Summers Madison, Sahara Davenport's family's positive reaction to her doing drag, Jessica Wild's language barrier, Tatianna's drama with Raven and Morgan McMichaels, Jujubee's family pride and Tyra Sanchez winning the season and her attitude on the show. It is then announced that Pandora Boxx is this season's Miss Congeniality.: Miss Congeniality: Pandora Boxx

== Controversy ==
Tyra Sanchez has gone through many controversies throughout the years since her win in season 2, leading to many people calling for her to be disqualified as the winner of season 2. She has a history of inflammatory tweets which either implicitly or explicitly call for violence, which has led to Drag Race distancing itself from her, including her being banned from RuPaul's DragCon LA 2018 after making a potential bomb threat while she claims to be the victim. Sanchez has come under renewed scrutiny in 2025 after posting widely criticised tweets mocking the passings of Drag Race UK Series 1 winner The Vivienne and Rupaul’s Drag Race season 4 contestant Jiggly Caliente. Renewed calls for her disqualification were made, and RuPaul seemingly responded by tweeting a GIF from a scene in season 2 where she appears to slap Tyra.
