= Whirly Girl =

1983 single by OXO

Single by OXO

from the album OXO
- B-side: "In the Stars"
- Released: February 1983
- Genre: Pop rock
- Length: 2:56
- Label: Geffen
- Songwriter: Ish "Angel" Ledesma
- Producers: Ish "Angel" Ledesma, Ken Mansfield

Music video
- "Whirly Girl" on YouTube

"Whirly Girl" is a US top 40 pop song performed by American dance-rock band OXO. The new wave style song was written and co-produced by singer/guitarist Ish "Angel" Ledesma (former singer and guitarist of Foxy) and included on OXO's 1983 self-titled debut album. The song was about Ish's wife Lori and was originally titled "Worldly Girl", "but adding that 'd' to the mix made the chorus too chunky and difficult to sing. So they abbreviated it to 'Whirly Girl' and pop music history was made with the only song to ever use the phrase 'Whirly Girl'." It was the band's sole hit, peaking at No. 28 on the Billboard Hot 100 in 1983. The song has since been re-released on a number of 1980s music compilations. It also reached No. 24 in Canada.

According to Ken Mansfield and Marshall Terrill, OXO "debut record on Geffen Records was a Top 30 hit called 'Whirly Girl' that died a painful death. The moment the record charted, the group began breaking up. Politics and power struggles erupted between management and Geffen". Following the breakup of OXO, in 1986 Ledesma formed the dance-pop group Company B, at first a trio with his wife among the members, which also had a sole Billboard Hot 100 hit (1987's "Fascinated") penned by Ledesma.

In 2015, G.J. Echternkamp, stepson of Frank Garcia (bassist of OXO), directed the semi-documentary Frank and Cindy, which includes a rearranged version of the song and some excerpts from its video clip.

== Chart history ==
Chart (1983)	Peak position
Canada RPM Top Singles	24
US Radio and Records Contemporary Hit Radio	14
US Billboard Hot 100	28
US Cash Box Top 100	29
