= Get Off =

Get Off may refer to:

- "Get Off" (Foxy song), 1978
- Get Off (Foxy album)
- "Get Off" (The Dandy Warhols song), 2000
- Get Off (Haywire album), 1992
- "Get Off", a song by Chris Brown from the 2017 album Heartbreak on a Full Moon

== See also ==
- "Gett Off", a song by Prince and The New Power Generation
- Getting Off (disambiguation)
