= OXO (band) =

American dance-rock band

- Origin: Florida, United States
- Genres: Dance-rock
- Years active: 1983–late 1980s
- Labels: Geffen/Warner Bros. Records
- Members: Ish 'Angel' Ledesma; (lead singer); Orlando Nuñez; (guitarist); (lead singer on the track "My Ride"); Frank Garcia; (bassist); Freddy Alwag; (drummer)

OXO was an American dance-rock band with the palindromic name formed in 1983 by Ish 'Angel' Ledesma, the former lead singer of Foxy. He formed the band with guitarist Orlando Nuñez, bass player Frank Garcia, drummer Freddy Alwag and an unlisted keyboardist: in the song 'Whirly Girl' the Hammond organ stands out and assumes an important harmonic role, but it is not seen in the video clip. They released only their self-titled debut in 1983, which scored a Top 40 hit with "Whirly Girl", a new wave style song about Orlando's current girlfriend at the time. The track was originally titled "Worldly Girl", "but adding that 'd' to the mix made the chorus too chunky and difficult to sing. So they abbreviated it to 'Whirly Girl' and pop music history was made with the only song to ever use the phrase 'Whirly Girl'." OXO's success was not to last, and the band broke up a few years later. According to Ken Mansfield and Marshall Terrill, on OXO's "debut record on Geffen Records was a Top 30 hit called 'Whirly Girl' that died a painful death. The moment the record charted, the group began breaking up. Politics and power struggles erupted between management and Geffen". In 1986, after the breakup of OXO, Ledesma formed the dance-pop group Company B, which at first was a trio with his wife among the members, and had a sole Billboard Hot 100 hit (1987's "Fascinated") penned by Ledesma.

Frank Garcia's stepson G.J. Echternkamp has directed two films about the relationship between his stepfather and his mother: the documentary Frank and Cindy in 2007 and the comedy of the same name in 2015, which includes a rearranged version of "Whirly Girl" and some excerpts from its video clip.

Episode 104 (April 12, 2007) of the Showtime series This American Life, based on the long-running PRI radio show, focuses on Frank Garcia and OXO.

== Discography ==
=== Album ===
- OXO – (1983) – number 117 (U.S. Billboard 200)

=== Single ===
- "Whirly Girl" – (1983) – number 28 (U.S. Billboard Hot 100)

=== Compilations ===
- Summer Fun Vol. 2 – "Whirly Girl", side 1/track 3 -(GSA) – (1983)
