= Company B (album) =

Studio album by Company B
- Released: 1987
- Recorded: 1986
- Genre: Hi-NRG, freestyle, dance pop
- Label: Atlantic; 81763
- Producer: Ish Ledesma

Company B chronology
Company B (1987)	Gotta Dance (1989)

Professional ratings
Review scores
Source	Rating
Allmusic	4/5 stars

Company B is the debut album by girl-group trio Company B. Released in 1987 on Atlantic Records, the album generated several dance club hits. Group members at the time of the recording consisted of Lori L. (Ledesma), Lezlee Livrano and Susan Johnson, and all tracks were written and produced by Miami-based musician Ish "Angel" Ledesma.

Comprising eight Hi-NRG and Latin freestyle tracks, the album spawned four U.S. Hot Dance Club Play hits, including the single "Fascinated," which hit number one on the Billboard Dance Club Songs and Dance Singles Sales charts. The song also crossed over to pop radio and peaked at number 21 on the Billboard Hot 100. Following the success of Company B, Livrano and Johnson left the group and were replaced by new members.

== Track listing ==
1. "Fascinated" — (5:24)
2. "Spin Me Around" — (4:57)
3. "Signed in Your Book of Love" — (5:31)
4. "I'm Satisfied" — (5:12)
5. "Perfect Lover" — (4:58)
6. "Full Circle" — (5:43)
7. "Jam on Me" — (5:06)
8. "Infatuate Me" — (5:08)

== Singles ==
- 1987 "Fascinated" (#21 U.S., #1 U.S. dance)
- 1987 "Full Circle" (#5 U.S. dance)
- 1988 "Perfect Lover" (#12 U.S. dance)
- 1988 "Signed in Your Book of Love" (#9 U.S. dance)

== Chart performance ==
Chart (1987)	Peak position
U.S. Billboard 200	143
