= Tandi Iman Dupree =

American drag queen

- Born: August 13, 1978; Memphis, Tennessee, US
- Died: December 31, 2005 (aged 27)
- Occupation: Drag queen

Tandi Iman Dupree (August 14, 1978 – December 31, 2005) was an American drag queen best known for her "Wonder Woman" performance to "Holding Out for a Hero" at the Miss Gay Black America pageant in 2001, the video of which went on to become an Internet viral hit after it was uploaded to YouTube in 2009.

== Biography ==
Dupree was born and raised in Memphis, Tennessee. Dupree began her dance career in high school when she was co-captain of the majorette squad until her graduation. She first began competing at the N-Cognito nightclub in Memphis, where she created original routines with other dancers in the area. Dupree's drag mother was Tamisha Iman. Dupree died from complications of AIDS in December 2005.

== 2001 Miss Gay Black America pageant ==
At the 2001 Miss Gay Black America pageant, Dupree and her dance partner Dee St. James performed a routine to the song "Holding Out for a Hero" by Bonnie Tyler. During the performance, Dupree was dressed as Wonder Woman, with St. James dressed as Superman. Dupree notably entered the performance by dropping from the ceiling, landing on the stage, breaking the heel of her shoe in a split. In 2009, this video was uploaded to YouTube, where it went viral.

== Accolades ==
Jake Coyle, an entertainment reporter for The Associated Press, described Dupree’s stage entrance at the 2001 pageant as the greatest entrance of all time.

The Dallas Voice expressed admiration for Dupree’s performance at the 2001 pageant, particularly describing the stage entrance as the "Best Drag Queen Entrance Ever."

== Influence on popular culture ==
Dupree's performance at the 2001 pageant inspired a tribute on the television series Glee, where Kitty Wilde began her dance performance to "Holding Out for a Hero" by landing on the floor in a split, an imitation of Dupree's performance at the 2001 pageant. In its review of the Glee episode, Out magazine referred to Dupree's stage entry as an "epic entrance."

Dupree's performance was referenced in episode three of the thirteenth season of RuPaul's Drag Race, in which Dupree's drag mother, Tamisha Iman, is a competitor. Kate Kulzick of The AV Club described the acknowledgement of Dupree's legacy as "wonderful to see".
