= Tamisha (given name) =

Tamisha is a given name. Notable people with the given name include:

- Tamisha Akbar (born 1970), American television personality known professionally as Tami Roman
- Tamisha Iman, American drag queen
- Tamisha Williams (born 1982), Barbadian badminton player
