= Alex Holdridge =

American writer/director (born 1975)

- Born: 1975 (age 49–50); Atlanta, Georgia, US
- Occupations: Writer, director

Alex Holdridge is an American writer/director currently based in Berlin, Germany.

Holdridge began making movies in the early 2000s in Austin, Texas. His first full-length film, Wrong Numbers, was a low-budget comedy about two 18-year-old guys who set out to forget their girlfriend troubles and buy a six-pack on the last night of school. The film stars Scoot McNairy, Matt Bearden, Matt Pulliam, Kirsten Cunnington, and David Pratt. It was co-written by Sam Merrick.

In 2003, Holdridge wrote and directed, Sexless. It won both the jury and audience awards at the 2003 South by Southwest Film Festival. It is a sex comedy about twenty-something couples' last month in Austin, Texas.

In 2008, Holdridge wrote, directed and produced In Search of a Midnight Kiss, a romantic comedy which was listed by the National Board of Review as one of the Top 10 Independent Films of 2008. Holdridge won the 2008 Independent Spirit John Cassavetes Award for work on the film. The film starred Scoot McNairy and Sara Simmonds, and was the third collaboration with McNairy and the second with Simmonds.

== Filmography ==
- Wrong Numbers (2001)
- Sexless (2003)
- In Search of a Midnight Kiss (2007)
- Meet Me in Montenegro (2015)
- Frank and Cindy (2015) – co-writer of screenplay
