= Get Off (Foxy album) =

Studio album by Foxy
- Released: 1978
- Recorded: 1978; Studio Center (Miami, Florida )
- Genre: Latin, disco, funk
- Label: Dash/ TK Records
- Producer: Cory Wade

Foxy chronology
| Foxy (1976) | Get Off (1978) | Hot Numbers (1979) |

Singles from Get Off
- 1. "Get Off" Released: 1978

Professional ratings
Review scores
| Source | Rating |
|---|---|
| Allmusic | 4.5/5 stars |

Get Off is the second album by Miami, Florida, Latin dance/disco group Foxy. The album contains the hit single, "Get Off".

== Track listing ==
1. "Tena's Song" (Charlie Murciano, Ish Ledesma) — 4:53
2. "Ready for Love" (Ish Ledesma) — 3:59
3. "Madamoiselle" (Carl Driggs, Ish Ledesma) — 4:46
4. "You" (Ish Ledesma) — 6:12
5. "Get Off" (Carl Driggs, Ish Ledesma) — 5:44
6. "Lucky Me" (Ish Ledesma) — 6:44
7. "Goin' Back to You" (Charlie Murciano) — 5:40
8. "It's Happening" (Carl Driggs, Ish Ledesma) — 3:30

== Personnel ==
- Ish Ledesma - backing vocals, guitar, lead vocals, melodica
- Richie Puente, Jr. - percussion
- Charlie Murciano - backing vocals, keyboards, woodwind
- Arnold Paseiro - bass
- Joe Galdo - drums, percussion, vocals
- Carl Driggs - backing vocals, lead vocals, percussion
- Bonaroo Horns - horns

== Chart history ==
| Chart (1978) | Peak position |
|---|---|
| U.S. Billboard Top Pop Albums | 12 |
| U.S. Billboard Top Black Albums | 3 |

=== Singles ===
| Year | Single | Chart positions | | |
| Year | Single | US | US R&B | US Dance |
|---|---|---|---|---|
| 1978 | "Get Off" | 9 | 1 | 18 |
