= Frank and Cindy =

- Directed by: G.J. Echternkamp
- Screenplay by: G.J. Echternkamp; Alex Holdridge
- Story by: G.J. Echternkamp
- Based on: Frank and Cindy by G.J. Echternkamp
- Produced by: Scoot McNairy; Bill Perkins; John Pierce
- Starring: Rene Russo; Oliver Platt; Johnny Simmons; Jane Levy; Marc Maron
- Cinematography: Tobias Datum
- Music by: Mac Quayle
- Production companies: The Group Films; Lleju Productions
- Release date: June 16, 2015 (United States)
- Country: United States
- Language: English

Frank and Cindy is a 2015 comedy film written and directed by G.J. Echternkamp. The film stars Rene Russo, Oliver Platt, Johnny Simmons, Jane Levy, and Marc Maron and is based on the true story and the 2007 documentary of the same name.

G.J. Echternkamp tells the story of his relationship with his parents, his mother Cindy Brown and his step-father Frank Garcia.

The film was released on 16 June 2015 in the United States.

== Plot ==
In 2005 G.J. Echternkamp interviews his mother Cindy Brown on camera. She explains her present relationship with his step-father Frank Garcia. He continues to grow more and more overweight over the years. Cindy is the only one who has worked and sometimes at two jobs. They sleep in separate parts of the house and, since the floor he spends most of the day on doesn't have a toilet, he uses coffee cans.

Two weeks earlier, G.J. gets picked up at the airport by his parents after completing his bachelor's degree. Cindy vows to respect his personal space and announces she's been sober 15 months. G.J. tries to hook up with someone he met at a bar, but Frank and Cindy scare her off.

Cindy tells G.J. her plan to fix her teeth, get a high end job and/or marry a producer and divorce Frank. On the answering machine, G.J.'s father Gilbert leaves a string of messages, which he ignores. Frank suggests G.J. film his music set up. That's when he discovers they spent his savings for Art Center without his knowledge, so he has no money to study film there. G.J. makes Cindy repeat her promise to change on camera and vows to record them both 24/7 so he'll have evidence when they don't follow through.

G.J. asks Cindy to tell him about the love of her life. Frank had been the bass player of OXO, an '80s band with the one-hit wonder song "Whirly Girl". She was the ultimate groupie who he asked to marry him although she was 20 years older. She thought life would be glamorous, but it didn't turn out that way.

When G.J. asks Frank why he didn't become a wildly successful musician, he vaguely blames the music industry. Then he mentions seeing an extremely enthusiastic fan and felt uncomfortable with the responsibility involved in being famous. When Frank asks why G.J.'s making the video, he says it's a 'where are they now?' thing for his future film school.

G.J. meets Kate at a club and invites her home to play video games. Unlike other women he has taken home, they keep things platonic as she's just gotten out of a long, bad relationship. Being brutally honest, G.J. shows her his collection of Polaroids of women he's had one-nighters with, they both agree they don't believe in love, Kate confesses she used to be fat and hates men with tiny penises, he admits he's often cheated.

Telling Cindy excitedly about a short he posted of his footage which had over 20,000 views, an inspired G.J. decides to make a documentary. She tells him the details of a car accident they had been in, that she suspects sedatives may have caused. Cindy regrets missing his childhood.

Going to Kate's gig, afterwards G.J. tells her about his excessively promiscuous dad. Another evening, after hanging out with her band he stays longer, and they are finally intimate. A while later he calls Kate, upset to discover his mother has been on sedatives. When she says it's because people don't change, she admits she doesn't trust him not to cheat so he hangs up angrily. The next day when Kate comes by, she sees a woman leaving and gets upset.

Fed up when Frank breaks his videocamera, G.J. travels to see his father in his trailer full of cats. Gilbert says Cindy used him to get pregnant and that she and Frank must have something special to tolerate each other for 20 years. G.J. goes back to his mom's for a call back for a job, but promises to be in regular contact.

Back at his mom's, she gives G.J. back his repaired videocamera. When he says he's done, she suggests they do an OXO reunion concert to complete the documentary. Cindy makes posters that say it's a cancer benefit concert. After Kate ignores a myriad of his calls, she shows up at the restaurant where he waits tables. Cindy convinces her he is miserable without her, so they speak outside, both confessing they slept with other people.

In a final interview, Frank talks to G.J. and the camera about his attempted suicide. After ingesting pills and cocaine, he begged the 12-y.o. G.J. to plunge a display sword into him. Obviously leaving a deep impression on him, he invites Frank to think about how it affected him. The stepdad insists that becoming a family has been his greatest achievement.

The gig is a success, bringing in $1600 and people genuinely enjoying Frank's show. Later, when pressed by Cindy, G.J. tells her on film she didn't completely screw up as a mom and says he loves her.

The movie includes a rearranged version of "Whirly Girl" and some excerpts from its video clip.

== Cast ==
- Rene Russo as Cindy Brown, Frank's wife
- Oliver Platt as Frank Garcia, bassist for OXO
- Johnny Simmons as GJ Echternkamp, Cindy's son
- Jane Levy as Kate
- Marc Maron as Gilbert
- Jessica Garrison as Lizzie
- Claire Titelman as Claire
- Fabianne Therese as Melissa

== Production ==
Writer and director G.J. Echternkamp is Cindy's real life son. He made the documentary Frank and Cindy in 2007 after filming his mother and step-father for a year.

Production on the film started in August 2013 with John Pierce, Scoot McNairy, Bill Perkins to produce.
