= Seth Caplan =

American film producer (born 1977)

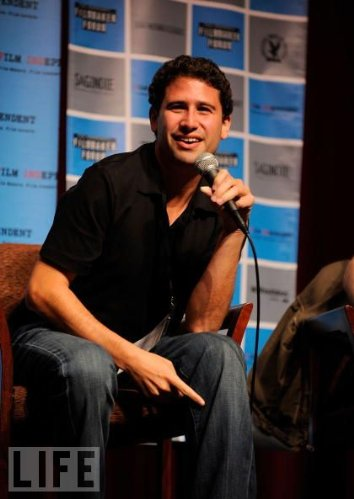
- Seth Caplan
- Born: April 15, 1977 (age 49); Chicago, Illinois, U.S.
- Occupations: Producer; Writer; Actor
- Spouse: Kristen Kolada Caplan (m. 2010)
- Children: 1
- Website: sethcaplan.com

Seth Caplan is an American film producer.

== Early life ==
Caplan grew up in Chicago, Illinois where he attended the Francis W. Parker School. He is a graduate of the Plan II program at the University of Texas.

== Career ==
His works include First Girl I Loved, In Search of a Midnight Kiss, Flatland: The Movie, and Teenage Dirtbag.

== Additional work ==
In 2001, Seth co-founded Enspire Learning with college friends Ben Glazer and Bjorn Billhardt. Seth remains a major shareholder in the company.

== Personal life ==
Seth is married to Kristen (Kolada) Caplan. He lives in Los Angeles, California.

== Filmography ==
- I Want Your Sex (2026)
- It's a Wonderful Knife (2023)
- Brooklyn 45 (2023)
- Mercy Black (2019)
- Blood Fest (2018)
- First Girl I Loved (2016)
- The Loner (2016)
- The Axe Murders of Villisca (2016)
- Follow (2015)
- Meet Me in Montenegro (2013)
- You, Me & the Circus (2012)
- Flatland 2: Sphereland (2012)
- Appointment in Vancouver (2010)
- The 2 Bobs (2009)
- Teenage Dirtbag (2009)
- In Search of a Midnight Kiss (2007)
- Flatland: The Movie (2007)
- The Cassidy Kids (2006)
- Duncan Removed (2006)

== Awards ==
In 2016, Seth won the Sundance Film Festival Audience Award: NEXT for First Girl I Loved, for which he was a producer.

In 2009, Seth won the Independent Spirit John Cassavetes Award for In Search of a Midnight Kiss, for which he was a producer.
