= Meet Me in Montenegro =

2014 film by Alex Holdridge

- Directed by: Alex Holdridge; Linnea Saasen
- Written by: Alex Holdridge; Linnea Saasen
- Produced by: Chris Aagaard; Seth Caplan; Ineke Hagedorn; Alex Holdridge; Peter Principato; Linnea Saasen; Paul Young
- Starring: Alex Holdridge; Linnea Saasen; Jennifer Ulrich; Rupert Friend
- Cinematography: Robert Murphy
- Music by: Stephen Coates (The Real Tuesday Weld)
- Production company: Good Viking Productions
- Distributed by: The Orchard (North America)
- Release date: September 7, 2014 (TIFF)
- Running time: 90 minutes
- Countries: Germany; United States; Norway
- Language: English

Meet Me in Montenegro is a 2014 American romantic comedy film written and directed by Alex Holdridge and Linnea Saasen. It had its world premiere at the Toronto International Film Festival and was released theatrically in July 2015. The film was distributed by The Orchard and stars Alex Holdridge, Linnea Saasen, Jennifer Ulrich, and Rupert Friend.

== Cast ==
- Alex Holdridge as Anderson
- Linnea Saasen as Lina
- Jennifer Ulrich as Federieke
- Rupert Friend as Stephen
- Stuart Manashil as Sam
- Ben Braun as Patrick
- Mia Jacob as Katherine
- Kate Mackeson as Olivia
- Deborah Ann Woll as Wendy
- Brent Florence as The Bachelor
- Natalie Gelman as Bachelorette
- Lena Ehlers as Pregnant Co-Worker
- Jason Ritter as Jason Ritter (uncredited)

== Production ==
The film was shot in various places across Europe over a three-and-a-half year period, with post-production being completed in Berlin.

== Reception ==
The film received mixed reviews from critics, with The Dissolve describing it as a "charming romantic comedy/drama" with a "smart script" and praising the lead performances; The Hollywood Reporter meanwhile felt that it was "all too familiar in its plethora of indie rom-com conventions", adding: "It's a marvelous travelogue: you'll immediately want to book tickets to Montenegro and Berlin [after] seeing it. But little else will linger in your memory". Similarly, the Los Angeles Times found it "scenic" and parts of the narrative to be "compelling", but summarised it as an "indulgent selfie of a big-screen romance".
