= Foxy (band) =

- Origin: Hialeah, Florida
- Genres: Disco, funk
- Years active: 1976–1980
- Labels: TK Records, Dash Records, Parlophone

Foxy was a late 1970s-1980 Latin dance/disco group from Hialeah, Florida.

== Career ==
The group initially consisted of singer and guitarist Ish "Angel" Ledesma, guitarist Richard "Richie" Puente, keyboardist Charlie Murciano, bass guitarist Arnold Paseiro, and drummer Joe Galdo, and (for the first album) co-lead vocalist Gary Ortiz. Shortly after the first album was issued, Ortiz was replaced by Carlo Driggs, who contributed vocals/percussion and shared songwriting credits on Foxy's second album, Get Off.

Foxy's biggest hit was "Get Off" in 1978 (written by Ledesma and Driggs), which peaked at #9 on the Billboard Hot 100 and #1 on the Soul chart for two weeks. The song was a Dutch #1 smash hit single. It was their only release from the 1978 album Get Off, which was released in 1978. In early 1979, the band (and session musician George Terry) were in Criteria Studios, Miami, where they played on the backing track of ABBA's song "Voulez-Vous", the only time ABBA recorded outside of Sweden.

Driggs left shortly before Foxy's third album was recorded and was not replaced. The group's third album Hot Numbers was released in 1979. The first single, "Hot Number" peaked at #21 on the Billboard Hot 100, and #4 on the Soul chart in 1979.

Keyboardist Charlie Murciano departed the band later in 1979, and the group, now a quartet (with session musicians on keyboards), issued one final studio album Party Boys in early 1979 and one live album Foxy Live (1980) before breaking up mid 1980. Ish "Angel" Ledesma also had issued a solo album Ish in late 1979 on the T.K. distributed Clouds label.

Ish Ledesma later formed the groups Oxo in 1983 and Company B in 1986, the latter with his wife Lori L., her sister Lezlee Livrano, and Susan Johnson and also issued his second solo album On This Corner on Geffen Records in 1986.

In addition to his involvement and writing credits with Foxy, Carlo Driggs was the lead singer of Kracker, which released three albums. Driggs was also the lead singer of Paul Revere & the Raiders for over 20 years (from 1983 till 2004). Driggs died in Miami, Florida on May 31, 2017, of a sudden massive heart attack after playing with his band at home at age 67.

Puente, who died on July 18, 2004, at age 51, was the son of bandleader Tito Puente. A news report on the website allaboutjazz.com said Richard Puente "was hospitalized after suffering from viral encephalopathy, which was the result of a brain injury during a mugging more than 10 years prior. Since his release from the hospital, Richie had been nonverbal, confined to a bed and using a wheelchair, and relegated to tube feeding. He resided at home with his 95-year-old grandmother and his mother, Ida Carlini."

== Discography ==
=== Studio albums ===
Year	Album	Chart positions		Record label
Year	Album	US	US R&B	Record label
1976	Foxy	—	—	Dash
1978	Get Off	12	3	Dash
1979	Hot Numbers	29	10	Dash
1979	Party Boys	—	—	Dash
1980	Live	—	—	Dash
"—" denotes the album failed to chart

=== Singles ===
Year	Single	Chart positions			Albums
Year	Single	US	US R&B	US Dance	Albums
1976	"Get off Your Aaahh and Dance"	—	39	16	Foxy
1977	"The Way You Do the Things You Do"	—	—	5	Foxy
1978	"Get Off"	9	1	18	Get Off
1979	"Hot Number"	21	4	26	Hot Numbers
1979	"Rrrrrrock"	—	—	66	Party Boys
1980	"Party Boys"	—	—	24	Party Boys
"—" denotes the single failed to chart
