= Freaky Friday Queens =

- RuPaul's Drag Race episode
- Episode no.: Season 13; Episode 10
- Presented by: RuPaul
- Original air date: March 12, 2021

Guest appearances
- Loni Love (guest judge); Char Margolis

Episode chronology
| ← Previous "Snatch Game" | Next → "Pop! Goes the Queens" |

"Freaky Friday Queens" is the tenth episode of the thirteenth season of the American television series RuPaul's Drag Race. It originally aired on March 12, 2021. The episode's main challenge tasks the contestants with giving makeovers to each other. American actress and comedian Loni Love is a guest judge. American psychic medium Char Margolis also makes a guest appearance for the mini-challenge.

Symone and Utica Queen win the main challenge. Denali is eliminated from the competition after placing in the bottom and losing a lip-sync against Olivia Lux to "Shackles (Praise You)" by American gospel duo Mary Mary.

== Episode ==
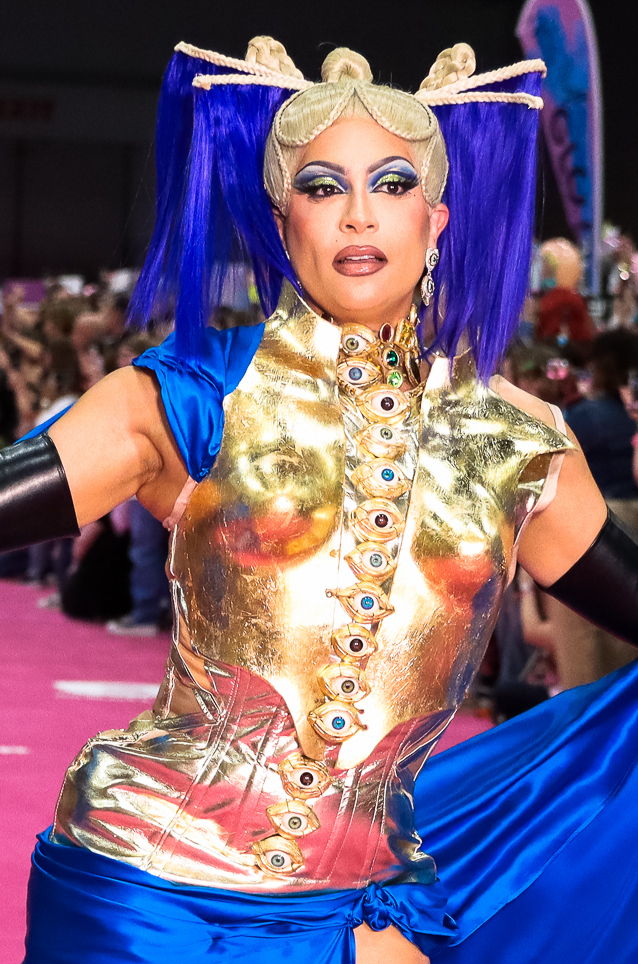
Denali (pictured in 2023) is eliminated from the competition.

The contestants return to the Werk Room after Elliott with 2 Ts elimination on the previous episode. On a new day, RuPaul greets the group and reveals the mini-challenge, which tasks the contestants with participating in a psychic reading with special guest Char Margolis. RuPaul puts the contestants in pairs, then reveals the main challenge, which tasks competitors with giving makeovers to each another as "drag doppelgängers". The teams are Denali and Olivia Lux, Gottmik and Kandy Muse, Rosé and Tina Burner, and Symone and Utica Queen.

The contestants begin to prepare for the fashion show. RuPaul returns to the Werk Room to meet with each pair, asking questions and offering advice. Utica Queen expresses concerns of being accused of cultural appropriation because Symone's concept is inspired by the 1997 film B.A.P.S., the title of which an acronym for Black American Princesses. The teams rehearse on the main stage. On elimination day, the contestants return make final preparations in the Werk Room for the fashion show. Gottmik talks about her gender transition and being a transgender drag performer.

On the main stage, RuPaul welcomes Michelle Visage, Carson Kressley, and guest judge Loni Love. RuPaul shares the assignment of the main challenge, then the fashion show commences. After the contestants present their looks, the judges deliver their critiques. RuPaul asks the contestants to share who they think should be eliminated from the competition and why. The judges deliberate, then share the results with the contestants. Symone and Utica Queen are both named winners of the main challenge. Denali and Olivia Lux place in the bottom and face off in a lip-sync contest to "Shackles (Praise You)" (2000) by Mary Mary. Olivia Lux wins the lip-sync and Denali is eliminated from the competition. Denali returns to the Werk Room to write a message on the mirror for the remaining contestants.

== Production and broadcast ==
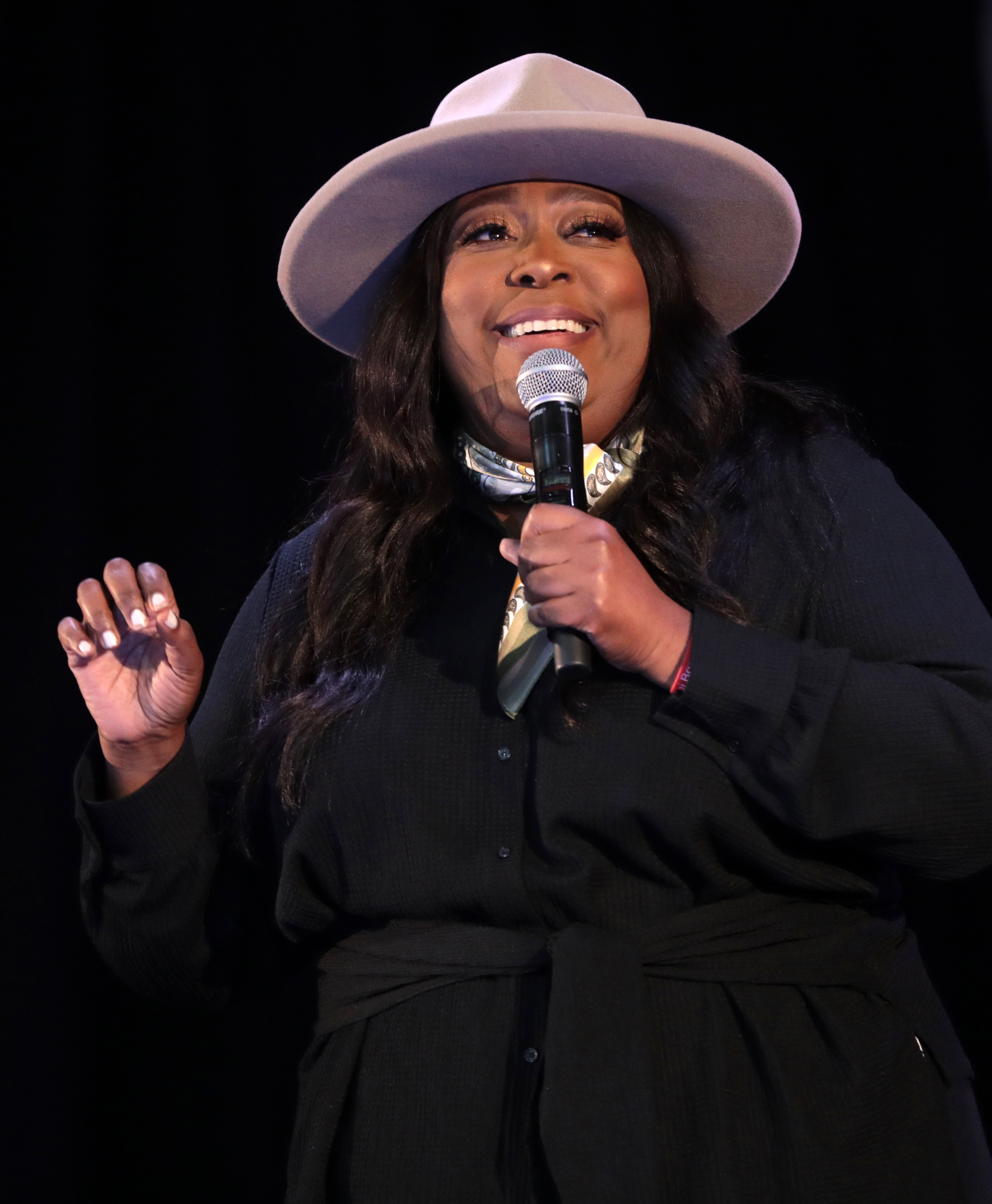
Loni Love is a guest judge.

The episode originally aired on March 12, 2021.

=== Fashion ===
For the main stage, RuPaul wears a red dress, matching earrings, and a blonde wig. For the fashion show, Rosé (as Tina Burner) wears a colorful 1950s housewife-inspired outfit, red high-heeled shoes, and a large red wig. Tina Burner (as Rosé) has a short dress, tall black boots, and a large pink dress. Olivia Lux (as Denali) wears a short light purple dress with toile, pink high heels, and a long blonde ponytail. Denali (as Olivia Lux) has a long sequined gown and a short wig. Symone (as Utica Queen) wears a bodysuit described by Screen Rant as a "performance art piece", featuring a headpiece with flowers. Utica Queen (as Symone) has an outfit has an animal print, a gold tooth, and a blonde wig. Gottmik (as Kandy Muse) wears a bodysuit, red high heels, a hat with flames, sunglasses, and a long blonde wig. Kandy Muse (as Gottmik) has a black-and-white outfit with a collar, mismatched stockings, and a long yellow wig.

== Reception ==
Kate Kulzick of The A.V. Club gave the episode a rating of 'B+'. Paul McCallion of Vulture rated the episode four out of five stars. The website's Justin Curto said Denali "took us to church" during the lip-sync contest. Michael Cuby of Nylon said, " Denali undoubtedly brought some of her trademark energy. But in the end, she was no match for the body-twirling, hair-flipping, attitude-giving Olivia Lux." Jessica Jalali included Symone and Utica Queen in Screen Rant's 2021 list of the show's ten best makeover challenge "transformations", writing: "Utica and Symone's drag personas and aesthetics could not be more different. However, opposites seemed to attract in this challenge where the team won."
