= Blood for Dust =

- Film poster
- Directed by: Rod Blackhurst
- Screenplay by: David Ebeltoft
- Story by: Rod Blackhurst; David Ebeltoft
- Produced by: Noah Lang; Mark Fasano; Nathan Klingher; Bobby Campbell; Arun Kumar; Ari Novak; Petr Jákl; Bernard Kira; Ryan Winterstern
- Starring: Scoot McNairy; Kit Harington; Josh Lucas; Stephen Dorff
- Cinematography: Justin Derry
- Edited by: Justin Oakey
- Music by: Nick Bohun
- Production companies: R. U. Robot Studios; Highland Film Group; Short Porch Pictures; Nickel City Pictures; Witchcraft Motion Picture Company
- Distributed by: The Avenue
- Release dates: June 2023 (Tribeca Film Festival); April 19, 2024 (United States)
- Running time: 104 minutes
- Country: United States
- Language: English

Blood for Dust is a 2023 American action crime thriller film written by David Ebeltoft, directed by Rod Blackhurst and produced by Noah Lang, Ari Novak, Mark Fasano and Nathan Klingher. It stars Scoot McNairy, Kit Harington and Josh Lucas.

Blood for Dust won the Best Feature award at the 2023 San Diego International Film Festival. The film was released in the United States on April 19, 2024 to generally favorable reviews from critics.

== Plot ==
Cliff, who in the past at his work had an affair with the wife of his company's CEO and who was involved in allegations of embezzlement, for which the CEO subsequently took the blame and committed suicide, loses his job as a travelling salesman of defibrillators after rumours of his involvement resurface when he attempts to blackmail his manager over poor defibrillator sales into giving him a higher commission. Unable to find employment elsewhere, he takes up an offer from his old colleague Ricky to become a drug- and gun-runner under his old travelling salesman cover for a local gang.

As Cliff makes his first run with a shipment of drugs and firearms, Ricky double-crosses both the gang and the recipients of the shipment and steals it. Suspecting that Ricky plans to have him framed and killed, Cliff alerts the gang's boss as to their whereabouts. During his conversations with Ricky it is revealed that Cliff persuaded the CEO of his old company into underhand dealings and thus Cliff was indirectly responsible for his suicide. As Ricky tries to sell the stolen drugs to local criminals, the gang arrives at the scene and in the ensuing shootout everybody except Cliff and Ricky gets killed. Cliff shoots Ricky dead and leaves a substantial portion of the money from the deal to the CEO's widow with whom he had an affair. Back home at a local church service with his wife, he gives a large donation to charity.

The film ends with a photocopy of Cliff's driver licence taken by the boss of the gang as security lying exposed at the gang's headquarters and easy for the police to spot.

== Cast ==
- Scoot McNairy as Cliff
- Nora Zehetner as Amy
- Ethan Suplee as Slim
- Amber Rose Mason as Rebecca
- Stephen Dorff as Gus
- Josh Lucas as John
- Kit Harington as Ricky

== Production ==
In May 2022, it was announced that McNairy, Harington and Lucas were cast in the film.

The film was shot in and around Billings, Montana, with principal photography wrapped in December 2022.

== Release ==
Blood for Dust premiered at the Tribeca Film Festival in June 2023. The film had its European premiere at the Deauville American Film Festival in France on September 3, 2023.

In March 2024, The Avenue acquired the distribution rights to the film, with a release date on April 19, 2024.

== Reception ==
=== Critical response ===
On the review aggregator website Rotten Tomatoes, 78% of 51 critics' reviews are positive. The website's consensus reads: "A grim throwback with a terrific cast, Blood for Dust is a spare and familiar story told with sturdy execution." Metacritic, which uses a weighted average, assigned the film a score of 58 out of 100, based on 5 critics, indicating "mixed or average" reviews.

Peter Debruge of Variety gave the film a positive review and wrote, "Bolstered by a strong, poker-faced ensemble with the good sense to underplay whatever menace each brings to the table, Blood for Dust does a fine job of making a familiar gambit feel unpredictable."

Jordan Mintzer of The Hollywood Reporter also gave the film a positive review and wrote, "Well-executed without breaking new ground."

=== Accolades ===
Blood for Dust won the Best Feature award at the 2023 San Diego International Film Festival.

At the Raindance Film Festival the film was nominated for Best International Film award, with McNairy nominated for Best Actor award.
