= Scoot McNairy =

American actor (born 1977)

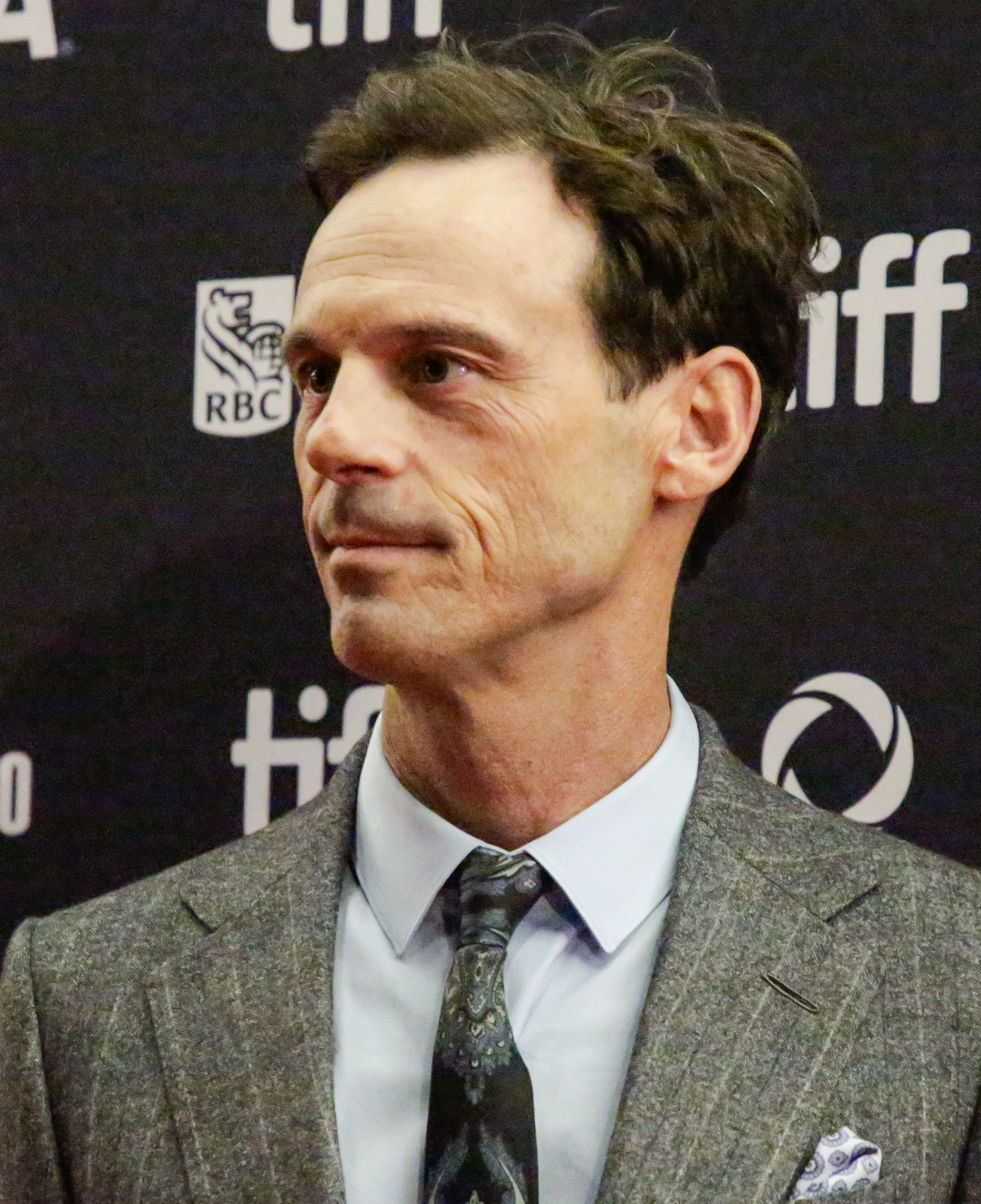
- McNairy at the 2024 Toronto International Film Festival
- Born: John McNairy; November 11, 1977 (age 49); Dallas, Texas, U.S.
- Occupations: Actor; film producer
- Years active: 2001–present
- Spouse: Whitney Able (m. 2010; div. 2019)
- Children: 2

John "Scoot" McNairy (born November 11, 1977) is an American actor. He is known for his roles in films such as Monsters (2010), Argo, Killing Them Softly (both 2012), Batman v Superman: Dawn of Justice (2016), Lyle, Lyle Crocodile (2022), Speak No Evil, and Nightbitch (both 2024).

On television, McNairy starred as Gordon Clark in the AMC period drama Halt and Catch Fire (2014–2017), Bill McNue in the Netflix miniseries Godless (2017), Walt Breslin on Netflix's Narcos: Mexico (2018–2021), Tom Purcell on the third season of True Detective (2019), and Rod Rosenstein in the Showtime miniseries The Comey Rule (2020). His accolades include an Independent Spirit Award and a Screen Actors Guild Award, as well as an International Emmy Award nomination for Narcos: Mexico.

== Early life ==
John McNairy was born on November 11, 1977, in Dallas, Texas. In addition to a house in Dallas, the family had a ranch in rural Paris, Texas, where they spent time on weekends and holidays. Growing up, he did theater in after-school programs. His father began calling him Scooter when he was about two years old. "A lot of people are like, oh, it must be some amazing story. But it's because I used to scoot around on my butt", says McNairy.

McNairy has stated that he is "highly dyslexic" and that he had to "go to dyslexia school for four years." He describes himself as a visual learner and was attracted to films for that reason. McNairy attended Lake Highlands High School.

== Career ==
=== Actor ===
McNairy moved to Austin, Texas, when he was 18 to attend the University of Texas at Austin. In 2001, he appeared in Wrong Numbers, written and directed by Alex Holdridge, which won the Audience Award at the Austin Film Festival. Holdridge was hired to remake Wrong Numbers into a studio picture, which was never made. Interested in cinematography and photography, McNairy moved to Los Angeles to go to film school. He attended for a year, then dropped out and began working in film production, doing carpentry and building film sets. He then worked as an extra before eventually securing a consistent job in more than 200 TV commercials. He eventually was offered roles in feature films, a career he has been pursuing since 2001.

During the early 2000s, McNairy portrayed colorful and individualistic young men with a rebellious edge. He had small parts in films, including Wonderland, Herbie: Fully Loaded, and Art School Confidential. 2010 saw the release of the alien invader film Monsters by Gareth Edwards, in which McNairy starred and featured largely improvised dialogue and was shot in Mexico, Guatemala, Costa Rica, and Texas.

In 2012, McNairy played Frankie in director Andrew Dominik's film Killing Them Softly opposite Brad Pitt. This led to a string of high-profile roles, including Ben Affleck's Argo, Gus Van Sant's Promised Land, and Lynn Shelton's Touchy Feely opposite Rosemarie DeWitt. For his role as Joe Stafford in Argo, he studied Persian, which he spoke in his final monologue in the film. In 2013, he appeared in Steve McQueen's 12 Years a Slave, which again included Pitt. McNairy filmed his second movie with Michael Fassbender, Leonard Abrahamson's Frank, and co-starred in Jaume Collet-Serra's Non-Stop, opposite Liam Neeson and Julianne Moore.

He appears in David Michod's The Rover opposite Robert Pattinson and Guy Pearce. McNairy starred as computer engineer and internet pioneer Gordon Clark in the AMC Network drama Halt and Catch Fire, about the personal computer business in the 1980s and 1990s. The series ran for four seasons from 2014 to 2017 to high critical acclaim. By coincidence, his character's wife in Halt and Catch Fire is portrayed by actor Kerry Bishé, who also played his spouse in Argo. McNairy played Wallace Keefe in Batman v Superman: Dawn of Justice. In September 2016, McNairy was announced as a cast member in the third season of the FX drama Fargo.

In 2017, McNairy played crime boss Novak in the crime drama Sleepless and returned to television when he co-starred in the Netflix western-miniseries Godless as nearsighted sheriff Bill McNue. He also portrayed DEA Agent Walt Breslin on Netflix's Narcos: Mexico. He received critical acclaim for his portrayal of troubled father Tom Purcell in the third season of True Detective in 2019.

McNairy next appeared in Taurus, alongside Machine Gun Kelly (who also co-wrote the script) and Megan Fox, which premiered at the 72nd Berlin International Film Festival. He also reunited with Andrew Dominik in the 2022 film Blonde, an adaptation of Joyce Carol Oates's historical fiction novel that chronicles the inner life of Marilyn Monroe. In 2022, McNairy also starred in the Netflix mystery film Luckiest Girl Alive and the live-action/animated hybrid musical comedy Lyle, Lyle, Crocodile. Additionally, he voiced a character in AMC's animated series Pantheon.

In 2022, McNairy filmed the drama The Line. He starred in the film Fairyland, which concluded production in June 2022. In February 2022, it was announced that McNairy would star alongside Michael Shannon, Emilia Clarke and Dane DeHaan in an upcoming Joseph McCarthy biopic. In May 2022, he reportedly joined Jack Reynor and Emily Browning in psychological thriller Brightwater. That same month, McNairy was announced as part of the cast for Blood for Dust, an action thriller, also including Kit Harington and Josh Lucas. McNairy appeared in the third season of the Amazon Prime series Invincible. In June 2022, McNairy joined Amy Adams in Marielle Heller's Nightbitch. Filming began that October.

McNairy portrayed folk singer-songwriter Woody Guthrie in the 2024 Bob Dylan biopic A Complete Unknown, which starred Timothée Chalamet.

In 2026, McNairy portrayed Officer Danny Kelly in Hulu's Furious.

=== Producer ===
McNairy worked as producer for 2007's In Search of a Midnight Kiss, in which he also starred and which is referred to as his breakout film. He has worked on a number of other projects as an actor and producer, including 2012's A Night in the Woods; and Angry White Man, Dragon Day, and The Off Hours, all released in 2011.

=== Other work ===
- In 2002, McNairy appeared in the music video for Death Cab for Cutie's "A Movie Script Ending".
- In 2006, McNairy appeared in the music video for "Fidelity" by Regina Spektor, directed by McNairy's friend Marc Webb.
- In 2007, McNairy appeared in the BookShorts film for JPod by Douglas Coupland, incorrectly credited as "Scoot McNally".

== Personal life ==
McNairy married actress Whitney Able in 2010. They initially started dating in Los Angeles about six months before co-starring in Monsters. They have two children. On November 19, 2019, Able announced that they had divorced. As of 2025, he is in a relationship with actress Sosie Bacon.

== Filmography ==
=== Film ===
Year	Title	Role	Notes	Ref.
2001	Wrong Numbers	Russell		
2002	Plugged In	Raver Kid #1	Short film	
2003	Sexless	Ryan		
2003	Wonderland	Jack		
2003	Silenced	Friend #1	Short film	
2004	D.E.B.S.	Stoner		
2004	White Men in Seminole Flats	Dale	Short film	
2004	Sleepover	DJ at Club		
2005	Herbie: Fully Loaded	Augie		
2006	Marcus	Charles		
2006	Art School Confidential	Army-Jacket		
2006	Bobby	Beatnik		
2006	The Shadow Effect	Harold Grey	Short film	
2006	Mr. Fix It	Dan		
2007	In Search of a Midnight Kiss	Wilson	Also producer	
2007	Blind Man	Sparky Collins		
2008	Wednesday Again	Peter		
2009	Shipping and Receiving	Steve Porter	Short film	
2009	Cop Out	Mike Singbush	Short film	
2009	The Resurrection of Officer Rollins	Shooter	Short film	
2009	Mr. Sadman	Stevie		
2010	Wreckage	Frank Jeffries		
2010	Everything Will Happen Before You Die	Matt		
2010	Monsters	Andrew Kaulder		
2010	Wes and Ella	Wes		
2011	Amor Fati	Teddy	Short film	
2011	The Off Hours	Corey		
2011	A Night in the Woods	Brody Cartwright		
2011	Angry White Man	Walt		
2012	Killing Them Softly	Frankie		
2012	Argo	Joe Stafford		
2012	Promised Land	Jeff Dennon		
2012	Please, Alfonso	—N/a	Producer only	
2013	Straight A's	—N/a	Producer only	
2013	Touchy Feely	Jesse		
2013	Dragon Day	Phil		
2013	12 Years a Slave	Merrill Brown		
2014	Non-Stop	Tom Bowen		
2014	All Hail the King	Jackson Norriss	Short film	
2014	The Rover	Henry		
2014	Frank	Don		
2014	Gone Girl	Tommy		
2014	Black Sea	Daniels		
2014	The Life and Mind of Mark DeFriest	Mark DeFriest	Voice; documentary	
2015	Lamb	Jesse		
2015	Our Brand Is Crisis	Rich		
2015	Frank and Cindy	—N/a	Producer only	
2016	Batman v Superman: Dawn of Justice	Wallace Keefe		
2017	Sleepless	Rob Novak		
2017	Aftermath	Jacob "Jake" Bonanos		
2017	War Machine	Sean Cullen		
2018	The Legacy of a Whitetail Deer Hunter	Greg		
2018	Destroyer	Ethan		
2019	Once Upon a Time in Hollywood	Business Bob Gilbert		
2019	The Parts You Lose	Ronnie		
2020	A Quiet Place Part II	Marina Man	Cameo	
2021	C'mon C'mon	Paul		
2022	Taurus	Ray		
2022	Blonde	Tommy "Tom" Ewell / Richard Sherman		
2022	Luckiest Girl Alive	Andrew Larson		
2022	Lyle, Lyle, Crocodile	Mr. Primm		
2023	Fairyland	Steve Abbott		
2023	The Line	Detective		
2023	Blood for Dust	Cliff		
2024	Nightbitch	Husband		
2024	Speak No Evil	Ben Dalton		
2024	A Complete Unknown	Woody Guthrie		
2025	East of Wall	Roy Waters		
2026	Family Movie			
2026	Company			
2026	The Life and Deaths of Wilson Shedd	Wilson Shedd		
2027	The Exorcist: Martyrs	Clay Silver	Post-production	

=== Television ===
Year	Title	Role	Notes	Ref.
2004	Good Girls Don't...	Henry	Episode: "My Best Friend Is a Big Fat Slut"	
2005	Six Feet Under	Trevor	Episode: "All Alone"	
2005	Close to Home	T.J.	Episode: "Meth Murders"	
2006	More, Patience	Jake	Television film	
2006	Murder 101	Panache	Television film	
2006	Jake in Progress	Dean Thomas Stilton	Episodes: "Eyebrow Girl vs. Smirk Face", "The Hot One"	
2007	How I Met Your Mother	Fast Food Worker	Episode: "Something Blue"	
2007–2011	Bones	Noel Liftin	Episodes: "The Secret in the Soil", "The Man in the Outhouse", "The Daredevil in the Mold"	
2008	Murder 101: New Age	Panache	Television film	
2008	The Shield	Doug Obermyer	Episode: "Snitch"	
2008	My Name Is Earl	Bed Bug	Episode: "Quit Your Snitchin'"	
2008	Eleventh Hour	Rudy Callistro	Episode: "Surge"	
2009	CSI: Crime Scene Investigation	Vitas Long	Episode: "Lover's Lanes"	
2011	The Whole Truth	Larry Thompson	Episode: "Lost in Translation"	
2013–2015	Axe Cop	Scoot / Sun Thief	Voice; 3 episodes	
2014–2017	Halt and Catch Fire	Gordon Clark	Main role (40 episodes)	
2017	Fargo	Maurice LeFay	Season 3 (2 episodes)	
2017	Godless	Bill McNue	Miniseries (7 episodes)	
2018–2021	Narcos: Mexico	D.E.A Special Agent Walt Breslin	20 episodes	
2019	True Detective	Tom Purcell	Season 3 (8 episodes)	
2020	Love Life	Bradley Field	2 episodes	
2020	The Comey Rule	Rod Rosenstein	Miniseries (2 episodes)	
2022–2023	Pantheon	Cody Lowell, Kurt	Voice; 8 episodes	
2023–2024	Invincible	King Lizard	Season 2; voice	
2026	Man on Fire	Henry Tappan	Main role	
2026	Furious	Danny Kelly	Main role	

== Awards and nominations ==
Association	Year	Category	Work	Result	Ref(s)
British Independent Film Awards	2010	Best Actor	Monsters	Nominated	
Georgia Film Critics Association Awards	2013	Breakthrough Award	Argo, Killing Them Softly and Promised Land	Nominated	
Georgia Film Critics Association Awards	2013	Best Ensemble	Argo	Nominated	
Georgia Film Critics Association Awards	2014	Best Ensemble	12 Years a Slave	Nominated	
Hamptons International Film Festival Awards	2012	Variety's Ten Actors to Watch	Killing Them Softly	Won	
Hollywood Film Awards	2012	Ensemble of the Year	Argo	Won	
Independent Spirit Awards	2009	John Cassavetes Award	In Search of a Midnight Kiss	Won	
International Emmy Awards	2022	Best Actor	Narcos: Mexico	Nominated	
Palm Springs International Film Festival Awards	2012	Ensemble Cast Award	Argo	Won	
San Diego Film Critics Society Awards	2012	Best Performance by an Ensemble	Argo	Nominated	
San Diego Film Critics Society Awards	2013	Best Performance by an Ensemble	12 Years a Slave	Nominated	
Screen Actors Guild Awards	2013	Outstanding Performance by a Cast in a Motion Picture	Argo	Won	
Screen Actors Guild Awards	2014	Outstanding Performance by a Cast in a Motion Picture	12 Years a Slave	Nominated	
Screen Actors Guild Awards	2024	Outstanding Performance by a Cast in a Motion Picture	A Complete Unknown	Nominated	
