= Char Margolis =

American psychic medium

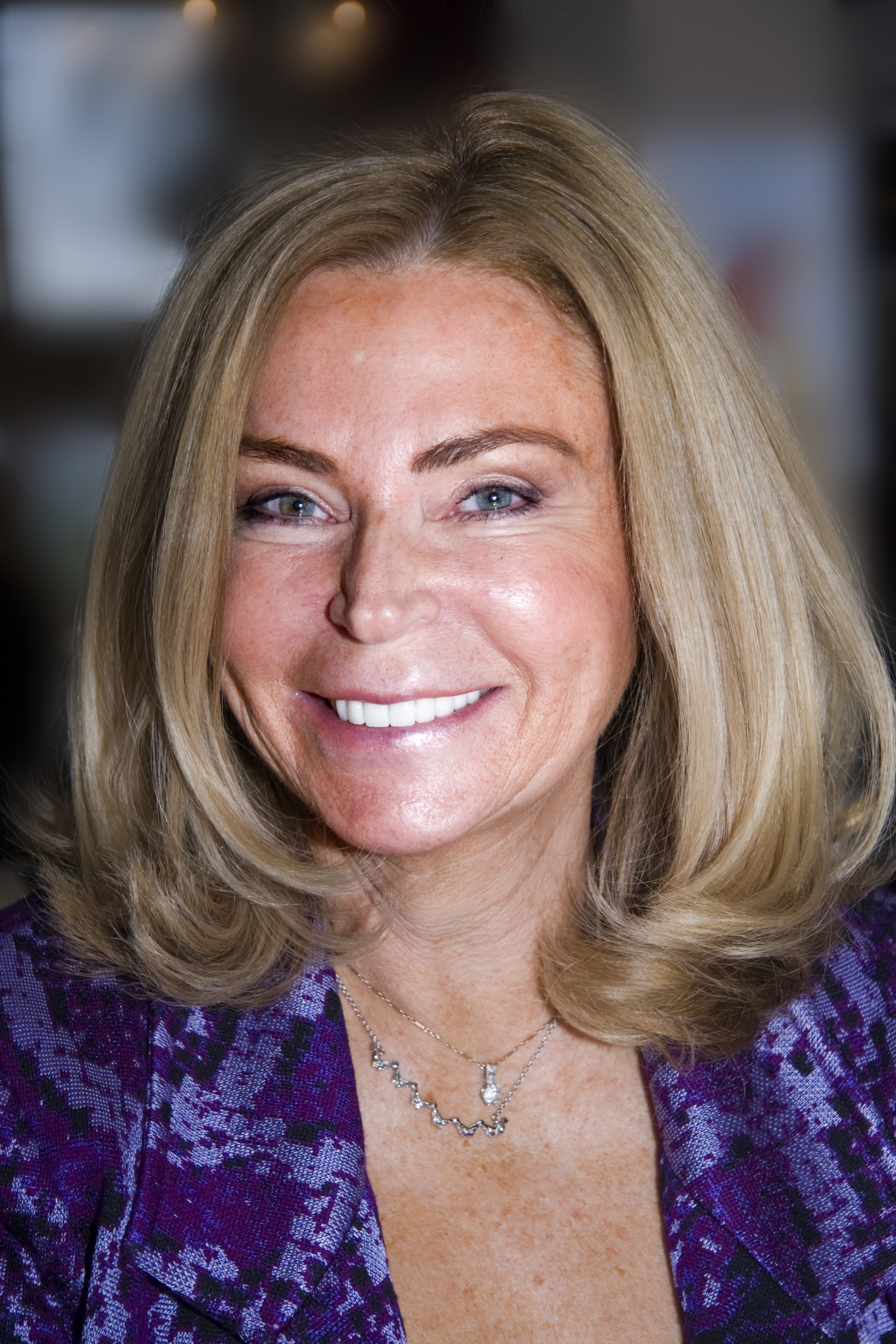
- Occupations: Author; Psychic medium

Char Margolis is an American psychic medium and author. She has appeared on several television programs in the United States, Canada, and the Netherlands. In the U.S., Margolis has been featured on shows such as Dr. Phil [1], The Dr. Oz Show [2], The Doctors [3], Live with Kelly and Ryan [4], and The View. In 2021, she appeared on an episode of RuPaul’s Drag Race titled "Freaky Friday Queens" [5], and she later hosted a web series called Reading Queens [6], where she performed readings for drag performers.

Margolis was also a guest on Live with Kelly and Mark [7] and is a recurring contributor on Canada’s The Morning Show [8]. In the Netherlands, she hosted the television show Char, which aired on RTL 4 and ran for multiple seasons between 2002 and 2010 [9].

In addition to her television work, Margolis hosts a podcast titled CharVision, which covers topics related to spirituality and the paranormal [10]. She is the author of several books, including The Universe is Calling You (2020) [11] and You Are Psychic (2022) [12].

== Career ==
Maclean's magazine reported in 2010 that Margolis "got her start in Canada on The Dini Petty Show in the late 1980s... and also guested on Camilla Scott’s and Vicki Gabereau’s shows in their heyday" (on CBC Radio). Maclean's also reported that in 2010, Margolis charged US$600 for a 45-minute phone reading, and US$825 for an in-person consultation.

In 2000, on Live With Regis, Margolis revealed Kelly Ripa's second pregnancy, which Ripa had been keeping secret.

From 2002 to 2010, Margolis appeared on the Dutch television program Char on RTL 4. In a 2004 interview on the Larry King Show, she said was scheduled to record the prime-time show in The Netherlands for six weeks in August. In an article, "Char, Char, Charlatan", Henk Westbroek reported in DePers.nl that in 2005 he was a guest on that show, and Margolis used cold reading and hot reading techniques on him. Westbroek said that this experience turned him into an unbeliever regarding her abilities.

Since 2015, Margolis has hosted a podcast, CharVision. In 2019, she had a series on WOW Presents Plus called Reading Queens, in which she read for former contestants of RuPaul's Drag Race.

== Bibliography ==
- Questions from Earth, Answers from Heaven (1999)
- Life: A Spiritual Intuitive's Collection of Inspirational Thoughts (2004)
- Discover Your Inner Wisdom: Using Intuition, Logic, and Common Sense to Make Your Best Choices (2008)
- Love Karma: Use Your Intuition to Find, Create, and Nurture Love in Your Life (2012)
- The Universe is Calling You: Connecting with Essence to Live with Positive Energy, Love, and Power (2020)
- You Are Psychic: 7 Steps to Discover Your Own Psychic Abilities (2022)
