= In Search of a Midnight Kiss =

- Theatrical release poster
- Directed by: Alex Holdridge
- Written by: Alex Holdridge
- Produced by: Anne Walker-McBay; Seth Caplan; Scoot McNairy; Alex Holdridge
- Starring: Scoot McNairy; Sara Simmonds; Brian McGuire; Kathleen Luong; Twink Caplan; Robert Murphy
- Cinematography: Robert Murphy
- Edited by: Jacob Vaughan; Frank Reynolds
- Music by: Tom Marks
- Production company: Midnight Kiss Productions
- Distributed by: IFC Films
- Release dates: April 27, 2007 (Tribeca Film Festival); July 24, 2008 (United States)
- Running time: 90 minutes
- Country: United States
- Language: English

In Search of a Midnight Kiss is a 2007 American independent romantic comedy film written and directed by Alex Holdridge. It was listed on the National Board of Review's Top 10 Independent Films of 2008, won the Independent Spirit John Cassavetes Award in 2009 as well as having earned awards at festivals around the world.

It premiered at the Tribeca Film Festival in 2007 and since has played at festivals around the world from Mill Valley, Chicago and Los Angeles in the U.S. to Raindance (London), Edinburgh, Sarajevo, Istanbul, Bangkok, Kraków, Thessaloniki and Melbourne outside the States. It has been released in theaters in the UK (Vertigo Films), the U.S. (IFC Films), Spain (Sherlock), Poland (Vivarto) and Greece (Seven Films). It was released in Australia on February 14, 2009.

== Plot ==
Wilson (Scoot McNairy), a 29-year-old man who has just endured the most miserable year of his life, newly arrived in the City of Angels, is alone and penniless as New Year's Eve approaches. He vows to lock his doors, pull his blinds, and climb into bed – until best friend Jacob (Brian McGuire) talks him into posting a Craigslist personal ad. In seemingly no time at all, Vivian (Sara Simmonds) responds, determined to be with the "right" man at the stroke of midnight.

== Critical reception ==
As of October 11, 2008, the review aggregator Rotten Tomatoes reported that 85% of critics rated the film positively based on 48 reviews, with the consensus: "Funny, quirky, and bittersweet, In Search of a Midnight Kiss is a romantic comedy with a heart and a brain -- and stands as a sharp debut for director Alex Holdridge." Metacritic reported the film had an average score of 64 out of 100 based on 25 reviews, indicating a generally favorable response.

The film appeared on some critics' top ten lists of the best films of 2008. Kimberly Jones of The Austin Chronicle named it the ninth best film of 2008, and Stephen Farber of The Hollywood Reporter named it the tenth best film of 2008.

== Awards and nominations ==
- Winner, 2009 Independent Spirit Award: John Cassavetes Award.
- National Board of Review - Top 10 Independent Film 2008
- Winner Florida Film Festival, 2008
- Winner Best Editing Woodstock Film Festival, 2007
- Winner Best Feature Film - Florida Film Festival 2007
- Winner, Best of Fest Edinburgh Film Festival 2007
- Winner, Nobel Bank Critic's Award Best Feature - Kraków's OFF Camera Film Festival 2008
