= RuPaul's Drag Race season 13 =

2021 season of RuPaul's Drag Race

RuPaul's Drag Race
- Season 13
- Promotional poster for season thirteen
- Hosted by: RuPaul
- Judges: RuPaul; Michelle Visage; Carson Kressley; Ross Mathews
- No. of contestants: 13
- Winner: Symone
- Runner-up: Kandy Muse
- Miss Congeniality: LaLa Ri
- Companion show: RuPaul's Drag Race: Untucked!
- No. of episodes: 16

Release
- Original network: VH1
- Original release: January 1 – April 23, 2021

Season chronology
- ← Previous; Season 12 Next → Season 14

The thirteenth season of RuPaul's Drag Race premiered on January 1 and concluded on April 23, 2021. The cast was announced via Twitter on December 9, 2020. The competition is broadcast on VH1 in the United States and showcases 13 new queens competing for the title of "America's Next Drag Superstar". VH1 renewed both RuPaul's Drag Race and its spin-off RuPaul's Drag Race All Stars for a thirteenth and sixth season respectively on August 20, 2020. Casting calls for season 13 were opened in December 2019. In addition to airing on VH1, the premiere episode was simulcast across 5 other channels: Logo, MTV, MTV2, Pop, and The CW, becoming the most-watched episode in the franchise's history.

After the season's first teaser trailer was accidentally leaked a day prior, the cast was officially revealed by season 12 winner Jaida Essence Hall on December 9, 2020. The teaser revealed that the season's premiere would consist of six "Lip-Sync for Your Life" battles in a Lip-Sync Extravaganza, along with a new socially distanced stage and werkroom design. The season welcomed Gottmik, the show's first ever openly transgender male and assigned female at birth contestant since the series began in 2009.

The season was filmed during the COVID-19 pandemic, relying on strict protocols, including isolation and testing of contestants, judges, and crew. On February 26, 2021, the series aired Corona Can't Keep a Good Queen Down detailing the season's production amid the pandemic, including unseen footage and reflections from the cast. The winner of the thirteenth season of RuPaul's Drag Race was Symone, with Kandy Muse as the runner-up and LaLa Ri as Miss Congeniality.

== Contestants ==
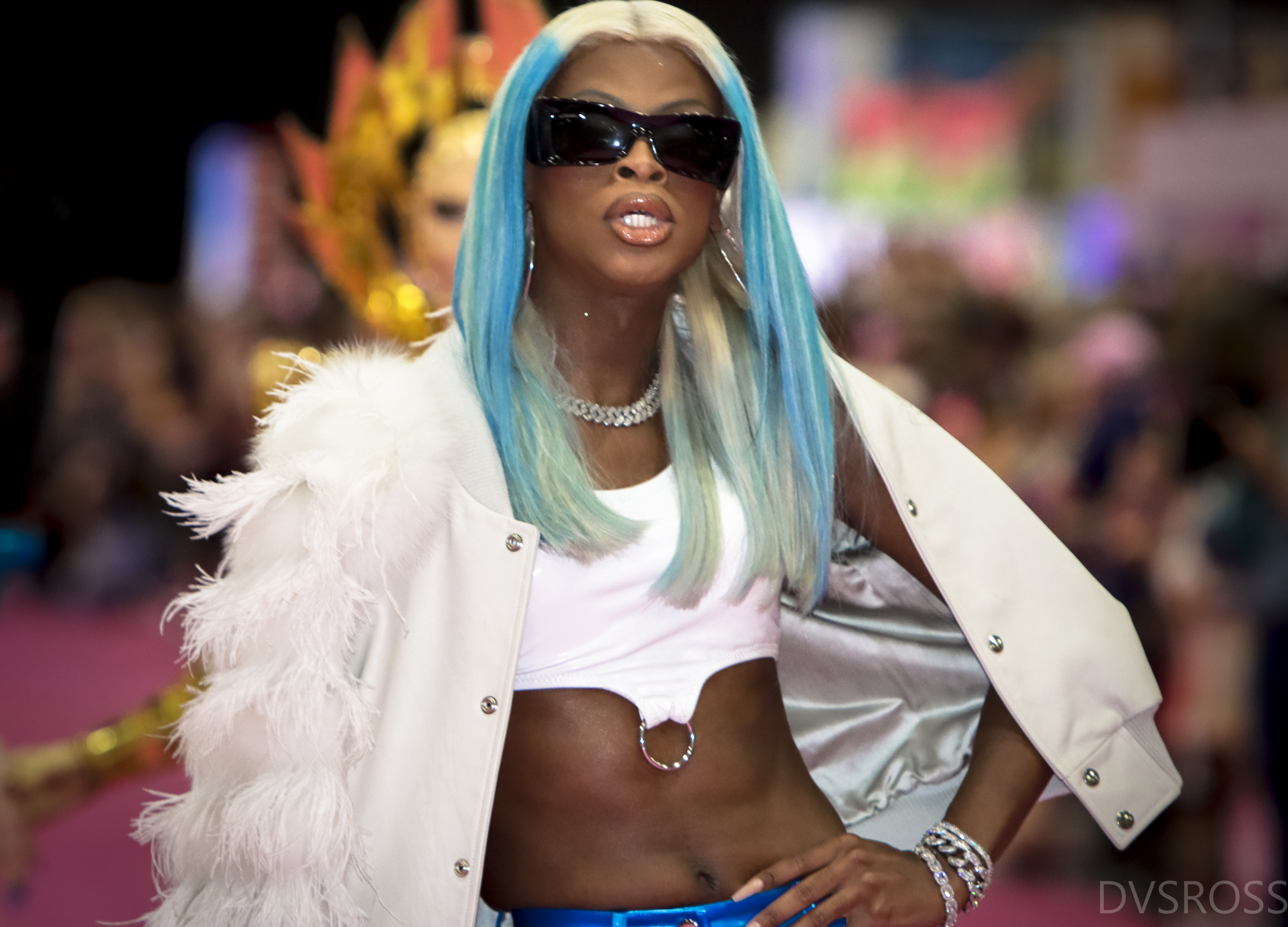
The winner, Symone

Ages, names, and cities stated are at time of filming.

Contestants of RuPaul's Drag Race season 13 and their backgrounds
Contestant	Age	Hometown	Outcome
Symone	25	Los Angeles, California	Winner
Kandy Muse	25	New York City, New York	Runner-up
Gottmik	23	Los Angeles, California	3rd place
Rosé (Note: The Rosé is referred to as Rosé on the show.)	31	New York City, New York	3rd place
Olivia Lux	26	New York City, New York	5th place
Utica Queen	25	Utica, Minnesota	6th place
Tina Burner	39	New York City, New York	7th place
Denali (Note: Denali Foxx is referred to as Denali on the show.)	28	Chicago, Illinois	8th place
Elliott with 2 Ts (Note: Elliott Puckett is referred to as Elliott with 2 Ts on the show.)	26	Las Vegas, Nevada	9th place
LaLa Ri	30	Atlanta, Georgia	10th place (Note: LaLa Ri was voted Miss Congeniality by fellow contestants.)
Tamisha Iman	49	Atlanta, Georgia	11th place
Joey Jay	30	Phoenix, Arizona	12th place
Kahmora Hall	28	Chicago, Illinois	13th place

== Contestant progress ==
Legend:

Symone won RuPaul's Drag Race season 13.
Kandy Muse was the runner-up.
LaLa Ri was voted Miss Congeniality (Miss C) by fellow contestants.
LaLa Ri won the Golden Boot (GB) for having the worst look of the season.
WIN indicates that the contestant won the challenge.
TOP2 indicates that the contestant was one of the two best performing in the challenge, but lost the lip sync to win it.
SAFE indicates that the contestant was declared safe by the judges.
STAY indicates that the contestant won the initial lip sync to stay in the competition.
LOSS indicates that the contestant lost the initial lip sync to stay in the competition.
BTM (Bottom) indicates that the contestant was up for elimination.
ELIM (Eliminated) indicates that the contestant was eliminated.
Guest indicates that the contestant returned as a guest.

Progress of contestants including placements in each episode
Contestant	Episode															
Contestant	1 (Note: Elliott with 2 Ts was voted out of the competition by the other lip sync losers. This meant she joined the winners' group on episode 2.)	2	3	4	5	6	7	8	9	10	11	12	13	14	15	16
Symone	STAY	WIN		WIN	SAFE	SAFE	SAFE	BTM	SAFE	WIN	WIN	BTM	SAFE	SAFE	Guest	Winner
Kandy Muse	STAY	SAFE		SAFE	SAFE	BTM	SAFE	BTM	SAFE	SAFE	SAFE	WIN	BTM	SAFE	Guest	Runner-up
Gottmik	STAY	SAFE		SAFE	WIN	SAFE	SAFE	SAFE	WIN	SAFE	SAFE	SAFE	SAFE	SAFE	Guest	Eliminated
Rosé	LOSS		TOP2	SAFE	SAFE	SAFE	SAFE	WIN	SAFE	SAFE	WIN	SAFE	WIN	SAFE	Guest	Eliminated
Olivia Lux	STAY	TOP2		SAFE	SAFE	WIN	WIN	SAFE	SAFE	BTM	SAFE	SAFE	ELIM		Guest	Guest
Utica Queen	LOSS		SAFE	SAFE	SAFE	SAFE	SAFE	SAFE	BTM	WIN	BTM	ELIM			Guest	Guest
Tina Burner	STAY	SAFE		SAFE	SAFE	SAFE	SAFE	SAFE	SAFE	SAFE	ELIM				Guest	Guest
Denali	LOSS		WIN	BTM	SAFE	SAFE	SAFE	SAFE	SAFE	ELIM					Guest	Guest
Elliott with 2 Ts	LOSS	SAFE		SAFE	SAFE	SAFE	BTM	SAFE	ELIM						Guest	Guest
LaLa Ri	STAY	SAFE		SAFE	BTM	SAFE	ELIM								GB	Miss C
Tamisha Iman	LOSS		SAFE	SAFE	SAFE	ELIM									Guest	Guest
Joey Jay	LOSS		SAFE	SAFE	ELIM										Guest	Guest
Kahmora Hall	LOSS		SAFE	ELIM											Guest	Guest

== Lip syncs ==
Legend:

The contestant won the lip sync to stay in the competition.
The contestant won the lip sync to win the challenge.
The contestant was eliminated after their first time in the bottom.
The contestant was eliminated after their second time in the bottom.
The contestant was eliminated after their third time in the bottom.
The contestant won the lip sync for a cash prize of $10,000 for a charity of the queen's choosing.
The contestant won the first round of the Lip Sync Smackdown for the Crown.
The contestant won the second round of the Lip Sync Smackdown for the Crown and was declared the winner of the season.

Episode	Contestants			Song	Winner
1	Joey Jay	vs.	Kandy Muse	"Call Me Maybe" (Carly Rae Jepsen)	Kandy Muse
1	Denali	vs.	LaLa Ri	"When I Grow Up" (The Pussycat Dolls)	LaLa Ri
1	Symone	vs.	Tamisha Iman	"The Pleasure Principle" (Janet Jackson)	Symone
1	Gottmik	vs.	Utica Queen	"Rumors" (Lindsay Lohan)	Gottmik
1	Olivia Lux	vs.	Rosé	"Ex's & Oh's" (Elle King)	Olivia Lux
1	Elliott with 2 Ts vs. Kahmora Hall vs. Tina Burner			"Lady Marmalade" (Christina Aguilera, Lil' Kim, Mýa, Pink)	Tina Burner
2	Olivia Lux	vs.	Symone	"Break My Heart" (Dua Lipa)	Symone
3	Denali	vs.	Rosé	"If U Seek Amy" (Britney Spears)	Denali
Episode	Contestants			Song	Eliminated
4	Denali	vs.	Kahmora Hall	"100% Pure Love" (Crystal Waters)	Kahmora Hall
5	Joey Jay	vs.	LaLa Ri	"Fancy" (Iggy Azalea ft. Charli XCX)	Joey Jay
6	Kandy Muse	vs.	Tamisha Iman	"Hit 'Em Up Style (Oops!)" (Blu Cantrell)	Tamisha Iman
7	Elliott with 2 Ts	vs.	LaLa Ri	"Whole Lotta Woman" (Kelly Clarkson)	LaLa Ri
8	Kandy Muse	vs.	Symone	"Boss" (Fifth Harmony)	None
9	Elliott with 2 Ts	vs.	Utica Queen	"Fascinated" (Company B)	Elliott with 2 Ts
10	Denali	vs.	Olivia Lux	"Shackles (Praise You)" (Mary Mary)	Denali
11	Tina Burner	vs.	Utica Queen	"My Humps" (Black Eyed Peas)	Tina Burner
12	Symone	vs.	Utica Queen	"No Tears Left to Cry" (Ariana Grande)	Utica Queen
13	Kandy Muse	vs.	Olivia Lux	"Strong Enough" (Cher)	Olivia Lux
14	Gottmik vs. Kandy Muse vs. Rosé vs. Symone			"I Learned from the Best (HQ2 Radio Mix)" (Whitney Houston)	None
Episode	Contestants			Song	
15 (Note: The eliminated queens were asked to prepare solo lip sync performances for the reunion. The two best ones then lip synced again. The winner got to donate $10.000 to a charity of her own choosing.)	Kahmora Hall			"Something He Can Feel" (En Vogue)	
15	Joey Jay			"I Want You Back" (NSYNC)	
15	Tamisha Iman			"Arrogant" (Tamisha Iman)	
15	LaLa Ri			"Bad Bitch Tip" (LaLa Ri ft. Ocean Kelly)	
15	Elliott with 2 Ts			"Hideaway" (Kiesza)	
15	Denali			"How You Like That" (BLACKPINK)	
15	Tina Burner			"Turn It & Burn It" (Tina Burner)	
15	Utica Queen			"You Should Be Sad" (Halsey)	
15	Olivia Lux			"I'm Goin' Down" (Mary J. Blige)	
15	Contestants			Song	Winner
15	Denali (NCTE)	vs.	LaLa Ri (NBJC)	"Be My Lover" (La Bouche)	Denali
16	Kandy Muse	vs.	Rosé	"Work Bitch" (Britney Spears)	Kandy Muse
16	Gottmik	vs.	Symone	"Gimme More" (Britney Spears)	Symone
16	Kandy Muse	vs.	Symone	"Till the World Ends" (Britney Spears)	Symone

== Guest judges ==
- Jamal Sims, choreographer (episodes 2 and 8)
- Nicole Byer, stand-up comedian (episodes 3 and 5)
- Loni Love, comedian and television host (episodes 4, 6, 10 and 12)
- Ts Madison, LGBT activist (episodes 7 and 9)
- Cynthia Erivo, English actress, singer and songwriter (episode 13)

=== Special guests ===
Guests who appeared in episodes, but did not judge on the main stage.

Episode 4

- Jeffrey Bowyer-Chapman, Canadian actor and Canada's Drag Race judge

Episode 5

- Stuart Vevers, British fashion designer and Coach's executive creative director

Episode 6

- Miguel Zarate, choreographer

Episode 8

- Anne Hathaway, American actress

Episode 9

- Victoria "Porkchop" Parker, contestant on season 1
- Raven, runner-up of both season 2 and the first season of All Stars

Episode 10

- Char Margolis, author and self-proclaimed psychic medium

Episode 11

- Jaida Essence Hall, winner of season 12

Episode 12

- Norvina, president of Anastasia Beverly Hills
- Valentina, contestant and Miss Congeniality on season 9
- Nina West, contestant and Miss Congeniality on season 11
- Heidi N Closet, contestant and Miss Congeniality on season 12

Episode 13

- Scarlett Johansson, American actress and singer
- Colin Jost, American comedian

Episode 14

- Jamal Sims, choreographer

Episode 16

- Jaida Essence Hall, winner of season 12
- Cory Booker, United States senator from New Jersey
- Paris Hilton, television personality
- Bob the Drag Queen, winner of season 8
- Thorgy Thor, contestant on season 8 and All Stars season 3
- Kennedy Davenport, contestant on season 7 and All Stars season 3
- Latrice Royale, contestant on season 4; All Stars season 1 and season 4
- Cynthia Lee Fontaine, contestant on season 8 and season 9, Miss Congeniality on season 8
- Victoria "Porkchop" Parker, contestant on season 1
- Eureka O'Hara, contestant on season 9 and season 10
- Heidi N Closet, contestant and Miss Congeniality on season 12

== Episodes ==
No. overall	No. in series	Title	Original release date
160	1	"The Pork Chop"	January 1, 2021
Thirteen new queens enter the workroom. For the first main challenge, the queens will face-off in Lip-Sync for Your Life battles. The first two queens, Joey Jay and Kandy Muse lip-sync to "Call Me Maybe" by Carly Rae Jepsen. Kandy Muse wins the lip-sync and Joey Jay loses. The next two queens, Denali and LaLa Ri, lip-sync to "When I Grow Up" by The Pussycat Dolls. LaLa Ri wins the lip-sync and Denali loses. The next two queens, Symone and Tamisha Iman, lip-sync to "The Pleasure Principle" by Janet Jackson. Symone wins the lip-sync and Tamisha Iman loses. The next two queens, Gottmik and Utica Queen, lip-sync to "Rumors" by Lindsay Lohan. Gottmik wins the lip-sync and Utica Queen loses. The next two queens, Olivia Lux and Rosé lip-sync to "Ex's & Oh's". Olivia Lux wins the lip-sync and Rosé loses. The final three queens, Elliott with 2 Ts, Kahmora Hall and Tina Burner lip-sync to "Lady Marmalade" by Christina Aguilera, Lil' Kim, Mýa, Pink. Tina Burner wins the lip-sync and Elliott with 2 Ts and Kahmora Hall lose. It is then revealed that the seven losing queens, will have to vote someone out of the competition.: Alternating Judges: Carson Kressley and Ross Mathews; Main Challenge: Face-off in Lip-Sync for Your Life battles; Lip-Sync Songs: "Call Me Maybe" by Carly Rae Jepsen, "When I Grow Up" by The Pussycat Dolls, "The Pleasure Principle" by Janet Jackson, "Rumors" by Lindsay Lohan, "Ex's & Oh's" by Elle King and "Lady Marmalade" by Christina Aguilera, Lil' Kim, Mýa, Pink; Lip-Sync Winners: Kandy Muse, LaLa Ri, Symone, Gottmik, Olivia Lux and Tina Burner; Lip-Sync Losers: Joey Jay, Denali, Tamisha Iman, Utica Queen, Rosé, Elliott with 2 Ts and Kahmora Hall
161	2	"Condragulations"	January 8, 2021
At the beginning of the episode, it is revealed that Elliott with 2 Ts has been voted out. The winning queens from last episode enter the workroom and are joined by Elliott with 2 Ts. For this week's mini-challenge, the queens will walk the runway showing off two looks: Day Time Drama Mama and Night Time is the Right Time. For the main challenge, the queens will write, record, and perform verses to "Condragulations". On the runway, category is Lamé You Stay. Elliott with 2 Ts, LaLa Ri, Olivia Lux, Symone and Tina Burner receive positive critiques. Gottmik and Kandy Muse receive negative critiques. It is announced that Olivia Lux and Symone are the top two queens of the week and will lip-sync for the win. They lip-sync to "Break My Heart" by Dua Lipa. After the lip-sync, it is announced that Symone is the winner.: Guest Judge: Jamal Sims; Alternating Judge: Ross Mathews; Mini-Challenge: Walk the runway showing off two looks: Day Time Drama Mama and Night Time is the Right Time; Main Challenge: Write, record, and perform verses to "Condragulations"; Runway Theme: Lamé You Stay; Top Two: Olivia Lux and Symone; Lip-Sync Song: "Break My Heart" by Dua Lipa; Challenge Winner: Symone; Challenge Prize: A $5,000 cash tip
162	3	"Phenomenon"	January 15, 2021
The queens who lost their lip-sync in episode one enter the workroom. For this week's mini-challenge, the queens will walk the runway showing off two looks: Lady and Vamp. For this week's main challenge, the queens will write, record, and perform verses to "Phenomenon". On the runway, category is We're Here, We're Sheer, Get Used to It. Denali, Rosé, Tamisha Iman and Utica Queen receive positive critiques. Joey Jay and Kahmora Hall receive negative critiques. It is announced that Denali and Rosé are the top two queens of the week and will lip-sync for the win. They lip-sync to "If U Seek Amy" by Britney Spears. After the lip-sync, it is announced that Denali is the winner.: Guest Judge: Nicole Byer; Alternating Judge: Ross Mathews; Mini-Challenge: Walk the runway showing off two looks: Lady and Vamp; Main Challenge: Write, record, and perform verses to "Phenomenon"; Runway Theme: We're Here, We're Sheer, Get Used to It; Top Two: Denali and Rosé; Lip-Sync Song: "If U Seek Amy" by Britney Spears; Challenge Winner: Denali; Challenge Prize: A $5,000 cash tip
163	4	"RuPaulmark Channel"	January 22, 2021
For this week's main challenge, the queens will overact in cheesy RuPaulmark holiday movies.: April Fool's Rush In - Gottmik, Joey Jay, Kandy Muse, Tamisha Iman and Tina Burner; God Loves Flags - LaLa Ri, Rosé, Symone and Utica Queen; Misery Love's Company - Denali, Elliott with 2 Ts, Kahmora Hall and Olivia Lux; On the runway, category is Trains for Days. Kandy Muse, Rosé and Symone receive positive critiques, with Symone winning the challenge. Denali, Kahmora Hall and LaLa Ri receive negative critiques, with LaLa Ri being safe. Denali and Kahmora Hall lip-sync to "100% Pure Love by Crystal Waters. Denali wins the lip-sync and Kahmora Hall is the first queen to sashay away.: Guest Judge: Loni Love; Alternating Judge: Ross Mathews; Main Challenge: Overact in cheesy RuPaulmark holiday movies; Runway Theme: Trains For Days; Challenge Winner: Symone; Challenge Prize: A $5,000 cash tip; Bottom Two: Denali and Kahmora Hall; Lip-Sync Song: "100% Pure Love" by Crystal Waters; Eliminated: Kahmora Hall; Farewell Message: "Keep chasing the sparkle. I love you ladies. - Kahmora Hall"
164	5	"The Bag Ball"	January 29, 2021
For this week's mini-challenge, the queens will get into baby quick drag and see who is the most misbehaved baby. LaLa Ri wins the mini-challenge. For the main challenge, the queens will create three looks for The Bag Ball: Mixed Bag, Money Bags and Bag Ball Eleganza. On the runway, Gottmik, Rosé and Utica Queen receive positive critiques, with Gottmik winning the challenge. Joey Jay, LaLa Ri and Tamisha Iman receive negative critiques, with Tamisha Iman being safe. Joey Jay and LaLa Ri lip-sync to "Fancy" by Iggy Azalea ft. Charli XCX. LaLa Ri wins the lip-sync and Joey Jay sashays away.: Guest Judge: Nicole Byer; Alternating Judge: Carson Kressley; Mini-Challenge: Get into baby quick drag and see who is the most misbehaved baby; Mini-Challenge Winner: LaLa Ri; Mini-Challenge Prize: A $2,500 gift card from FierceQueen.com; Main Challenge: The Bag Ball; Runway Themes: Mixed Bag, Money Bags and Bag Ball Eleganza; Challenge Winner: Gottmik; Challenge Prize: A $5,000 cash tip; Bottom Two: Joey Jay and LaLa Ri; Lip Sync Song: "Fancy" by Iggy Azalea ft. Charli XCX; Eliminated: Joey Jay; Farewell Message: "I'm a gay ass bitch... I'm WHO? xoxo ♥ Joey Jay! ♥"
165	6	"Disco-mentary"	February 5, 2021
For this week's mini-challenge, the queens will create a dress made from wallpaper. Elliott with 2 Ts and Tamisha Iman wins the mini-challenge. For the main challenge, the queens will perform in a disco-themed dance documentary.: The Birth of Disco - Gottmik, Kandy Muse and Tina Burner; Disco & Sex - Elliott with 2 Ts and Tamisha Iman; Studio 54 - Olivia Lux and Utica Queen; Disco Fashion - Denali and Rosé; Disco Sucks - LaLa Ri and Symone; On the runway, category is Little Black Dress. Elliott with 2 Ts, Olivia Lux and Tina Burner receive positive critiques, with Olivia Lux winning the challenge. Kandy Muse, Tamisha Iman and Utica Queen receive negative critiques, with Utica Queen being safe. Kandy Muse and Tamisha Iman lip-sync to "Hit 'Em Up Style (Oops!)" by Blu Cantrell. Kandy Muse wins the lip-sync and Tamisha Iman sashays away.: Guest Judge: Loni Love; Alternating Judge: Carson Kressley; Mini-Challenge: Create a dress made from wallpaper; Mini-Challenge Winners: Elliott with 2 Ts and Tamisha Iman; Mini-Challenge Prize: A $2,500 gift card from Spoonflower; Main Challenge: Perform in a disco-themed dance documentary; Runway Theme: Little Black Dress; Challenge Winner: Olivia Lux; Challenge Prize: A $5,000 cash tip; Bottom Two: Kandy Muse and Tamisha Iman; Lip-Sync Song: "Hit 'Em Up Style (Oops!)" by Blu Cantrell; Eliminated: Tamisha Iman; Farewell Message: "Till we meet again. Love Misha ♥"
166	7	"Bossy Rossy RuBoot"	February 12, 2021
For this week's mini-challenge, the queens will read each other to filth. Gottmik wins the mini-challenge. For the main challenge, the queens will team up and improvise in the new night-time talk show "Bossy Rossy After Dark".: I'm Pregnant with My Imaginary Boyfriend's Baby! - Denali, LaLa Ri and Rosé; Breaking My Silence: Escape from the Cult of Mime-ology! - Gottmik, Olivia Lux and Utica Queen; Former Teen Queens: Where Are They Now? - Kandy Muse and Symone; My Best Friend's 600 Pound Ass is Killing our Friendship! - Elliott with 2 Ts and Tina Burner; On the runway, category is Bead It. Kandy Muse, Olivia Lux and Symone receive positive critiques, with Olivia Lux winning the challenge. Elliott with 2 Ts, LaLa Ri and Utica Queen receive negative critiques, with Utica Queen being safe. Elliott with 2 Ts and LaLa Ri lip-sync to "Whole Lotta Woman" by Kelly Clarkson. Elliott with 2 Ts wins the lip-sync and LaLa Ri sashays away.: Guest Judge: Ts Madison; Alternating Judge: Ross Mathews; Mini-Challenge: Reading is Fundamental; Mini-Challenge Winner: Gottmik; Mini-Challenge Prize: A $2,500 giftcard from ISLYNYC; Main Challenge: In teams, improvise in the new night-time talk show "Bossy Rossy After Dark"; Runway Theme: Bead It; Challenge Winner: Olivia Lux; Challenge Prize: A $5,000 cash tip; Bottom Two: Elliott with 2 Ts and LaLa Ri; Lip-Sync Song: "Whole Lotta Woman" by Kelly Clarkson; Eliminated: LaLa Ri; Farewell Message: "Slay! Then save me a plate! Love yall! LaLa Ri!"
167	8	"Social Media: The Unverified Rusical"	February 19, 2021
For this week's main challenge, the queens will perform in Social Media: The Unverified Rusical.: Denali plays Russian Bot, Nikita; Elliott with 2 Ts plays Miss TokTik; Gottmik plays Russian Bot, Natasha; Kandy Muse plays Reverend Dr. Lady Linked In; Olivia Lux plays Markie Tuckenberg; Rosé plays Foxy; Symone plays Miss InstaGlam; Tina Burner plays EmShee; Utica Queen plays Lady Tweets; On the runway, category is Yellow, Gorgeous. Denali, Gottmik and Rosé receive positive critiques, with Rosé winning the challenge. Kandy Muse, Symone and Tina Burner receive negative critiques, with Tina Burner being safe. Kandy Muse and Symone lip-sync to "Boss" by Fifth Harmony. Symone is declared the winner of the lip sync and Kandy is asked to sashay away. However, just before Kandy exits, RuPaul tells her that she is safe to slay another day and is allowed to remain in the competition.: Guest Judge: Jamal Sims; Alternating Judge: Ross Mathews; Main Challenge: Social Media: The Unverified Rusical; Runway Theme: Yellow, Gorgeous; Challenge Winner: Rosé; Challenge Prize: A $5,000 cash tip; Bottom Two: Kandy Muse and Symone; Lip-Sync Song: "Boss" by Fifth Harmony; Eliminated: None
168	9	"Snatch Game"	March 5, 2021
For this week's mini-challenge, the queens will audition for the Pantyhoes band. Tina Burner wins the mini-challenge. For the main challenge, the queens will play the Snatch Game. Raven and Victoria "Porkchop" Parker star as the celebrity contestants. The cast consisted of: Denali as Jonathan Van Ness; Elliott with 2 Ts as Rue McClanahan; Gottmik as Paris Hilton; Kandy Muse as Patrick Starrr; Olivia Lux as Tabitha Brown; Rosé as Mary, Queen of Scots; Symone as Harriet Tubman; Tina Burner as Richard Simmons; Utica Queen as Bob Ross; On the runway, category is Fascinating Fascinators. Denali, Gottmik and Rosé receive positive critiques, with Gottmik winning the challenge. Elliott with 2 Ts, Olivia Lux and Utica Queen receive negative critiques, with Olivia Lux being safe. Elliott with 2 Ts and Utica Queen lip-sync to "Fascinated" by Company B. Utica Queen wins the lip-sync and Elliott with 2 Ts sashays away.: Guest Judge: Ts Madison; Alternating Judge: Carson Kressley; Mini-Challenge: Audition for the Pantyhoes band; Mini-Challenge Winner: Tina Burner; Mini-Challenge Prize: A $2,500 tip, courtesy of Snag Tights; Main Challenge: Snatch Game; Runway Theme: Fascinating Fascinators; Challenge Winner: Gottmik; Challenge Prize: A $5,000 cash tip; Bottom Two: Elliott with 2 Ts and Utica Queen; Lip-Sync Song: "Fascinated" by Company B; Eliminated: Elliott with 2 Ts; Farewell Message: "It took y'all hoes 4 times to get rid of me!!! Be kind and make it HOE! xoxo Elliott with 2 Ts"
169	10	"Freaky Friday Queens"	March 12, 2021
For this week's main challenge, the queens will makeover another queen into your own drag doppelganger.: Denali and Olivia Lux; Gottmik and Kandy Muse; Rosé and Tina Burner; Symone and Utica Queen; On the runway, category is Drag Doppelgangers. Gottmik, Kandy Muse, Symone and Utica Queen receive positive critiques, with Symone and Utica both winning the challenge. Denali, Olivia Lux, Rosé and Tina Burner receive negative critiques, with Rosé and Tina Burner being safe. Denali and Olivia Lux lip-sync to "Shackles (Praise You)" by Mary Mary. Olivia Lux wins the lip-sync and Denali sashays away.: Guest Judge: Loni Love; Alternating Judge: Carson Kressley; Main Challenge: Makeover another queen into your own drag doppelganger; Runway Theme: Drag Doppelgangers; Challenge Winners: Symone and Utica Queen; Challenge Prize: A $5,000 cash tip; Bottom Two: Denali and Olivia Lux; Lip-Sync Song: "Shackles (Praise You)" by Mary Mary; Eliminated: Denali; Farewell Message: "Clara Clara, over any gold medal, crown or cash prize, my sisters were the greatest reward. Ass of '13 off to get some D! L8r sk8ers! ♥ Denali"
170	11	"Pop! Goes the Queens"	March 19, 2021
For this week's mini-challenge, the queens will play a trivia game with the pit crew called, "Are You Smarter Than the Pit Crew". Kandy Muse wins the mini-challenge. For the main challenge, the queens will create, market, and film a commercial for your own soft drink.: Gottmik - Gottmik's GotSexxx Sex Juice; Kandy Muse - The K Special; Olivia Lux - Liv(e); Rosé - RoseAid; Symone - Sweet Toof; Tina Burner - Burnin' Up; Utica Queen - Utican; On the runway, category is Beast Couture. Kandy Muse, Rosé and Symone receive positive critiques, with Rosé and Symone both winning the challenge. Gottmik, Olivia Lux, Tina Burner and Utica Queen receive negative critiques, with Gottmik and Olivia Lux being safe. Tina Burner and Utica Queen lip-sync to "My Humps" by Black Eyed Peas. Utica Queen wins the lip-sync and Tina Burner sashays away.: Alternating Judges: Carson Kressley and Ross Mathews; Mini-Challenge: "Are You Smarter Than the Pit Crew" trivia game; Mini-Challenge Winner: Kandy Muse; Mini-Challenge Prize: A $2,500 gift card from JJ Malibu; Main Challenge: Create, market, and film a commercial for your own soft drink; Runway Theme: Beast Couture; Challenge Winners: Rosé and Symone; Challenge Prize: A $5,000 cash tip; Bottom Two: Tina Burner and Utica Queen; Lip-Sync Song: "My Humps" by Black Eyed Peas; Eliminated: Tina Burner; Farewell Message: "Live life with no apologies. Be your true authentic self. Let your light shine. Turn it and burn it. xx the Manhattan monster Tina B."
171	12	"Nice Girls Roast"	March 26, 2021
For this week's mini-challenge, the queens will pair up and star in a live makeup tutorial on how to take a glamorous selfie. Kandy Muse and Rosé win the mini-challenge. For the main challenge, the queens will perform a roast of previous Miss Congenialities Heidi N Closet, Nina West and Valentina. On the runway, Gottmik, Kandy Muse and Rosé receive positive critiques, with Kandy Muse winning the challenge. Olivia Lux, Symone and Utica Queen receive negative critiques, with Olivia Lux being safe. Symone and Utica Queen lip-sync to "No Tears Left To Cry" by Ariana Grande. Symone wins the lip-sync and Utica Queen sashays away.: Guest Judge: Loni Love; Alternating Judge: Ross Mathews; Mini-Challenge: In pairs, star in a live makeup tutorial on how to take a glamorous selfie; Mini-Challenge Winner: Kandy Muse and Rosé; Mini-Challenge Prize: $2,500 worth of Anastasia Beverly Hills cosmetics; Main Challenge: Perform a roast of previous Miss Congenialities Heidi N Closet, Nina West and Valentina; Challenge Winner: Kandy Muse; Challenge Prize: A $5,000 cash tip; Bottom Two: Symone and Utica Queen; Lip-Sync Song: "No Tears Left To Cry" by Ariana Grande; Eliminated: Utica Queen; Farewell Message: "Hay Goobers ♥ I'm so happy to have you all in my life now! To my new sisters, I love you so much and love yourself inside & out ♥ Wiggle to the Top! Utica"
172	13	"Henny, I Shrunk the Drag Queens!"	April 2, 2021
For this week's main challenge, the queens will star in the new sci-fi adventure "Henny, I Shrunk the Drag Queens!": Gottmik plays Chardonnay; Kandy Muse plays Dominique Perignon; Olivia Lux plays Ginger Ale; Rosé plays Brandy; Symone plays Margarita; On the runway, category is Haute Pockets. Gottmik, Rosé and Symone receive positive critiques, with Rosé winning the challenge. Kandy Muse and Olivia Lux receive negative critiques, and are announced as the bottom two. They lip-sync to "Strong Enough" by Cher. Kandy Muse wins the lip-sync and Olivia Lux sashays away.: Guest Judge: Cynthia Erivo; Alternating Judge: Carson Kressley; Main Challenge: Star in the new sci-fi adventure "Henny, I Shrunk the Drag Queens!"; Runway Theme: Haute Pockets; Challenge Winner: Rosé; Challenge Prize: A $5,000 cash tip; Bottom Two: Kandy Muse and Olivia Lux; Lip-Sync Song: "Strong Enough" by Cher; Eliminated: Olivia Lux; Farewell Message: ""Believe in yourself, I believe in you! ♥" xoxo your polite diva, Liv"
173	14	"Gettin' Lucky"	April 9, 2021
For the final challenge of the season, the queens will write, record and perform their own verses to RuPaul's song "Lucky". On the runway, category is Drag Excellence. The remaining queens then lip-sync to " I Learned from the Best (HQ2 Radio Mix)" by Whitney Houston. After the lip-sync, Gottmik, Kandy Muse, Rosé and Symone are announced as the finalists.: Alternating Judges: Carson Kressley and Ross Mathews; Main Challenge: Write, record, and perform their own verses to RuPaul's song "Lucky"; Runway Theme: Drag Excellence; Lip-Sync Song: " I Learned from the Best (HQ2 Radio Mix)" by Whitney Houston; Eliminated: None
174	15	"Reunited"	April 16, 2021
The queens all return virtually for the reunion. The eliminated queens all lip-sync in a self-directed music video. LaLa Ri receives the new Golden Boot Award for her episode five Bag Ball Eleganza Look. Denali and LaLa Ri are both awarded this season's "Lip-Sync Assassins" and will battle in a lip-sync for a charity of their own choosing. They lip-sync to "Be My Lover" by La Bouche. Denali wins the lip-sync and wins $10,000 for her charity National Center for Transgender Equality. LaLa Ri also wins $5,000 for her charity National Black Justice Coalition.
175	16	"Grand Finale"	April 23, 2021
All the queens return for the grand finale. LaLa Ri is announced as this season's Miss Congeniality. RuPaul then announces that the queens will take part in the lip-sync smackdown for the crown. The first lip-sync is between Kandy Muse and Rosé. They lip-sync to "Work Bitch" by Britney Spears. Kandy Muse wins the lip-sync and Rosé is eliminated. The second lip-sync is between Gottmik and Symone. They lip-sync to "Gimme More" by Britney Spears. Symone wins the lip-sync and Gottmik is eliminated. The final lip-sync is between Kandy Muse and Symone. They lip-sync to "Till the World Ends" by Britney Spears. It is announced that Symone is the winner, leaving Kandy Muse as the runner-up.: Finals venue: Ace Theater, Los Angeles, California; Final Four: Gottmik, Kandy Muse, Rosé and Symone; Miss Congeniality: LaLa Ri; Lip-Sync Smackdown #1: Kandy Muse vs. Rosé; Lip-Sync Song: "Work Bitch" by Britney Spears; Eliminated: Rosé; Lip-Sync Smackdown #2: Gottmik vs. Symone; Lip-Sync Song: "Gimme More" by Britney Spears; Eliminated: Gottmik; Lip-Sync Smackdown #3: Kandy Muse vs. Symone; Lip-Sync Song: "Till the World Ends" by Britney Spears; Runner-up: Kandy Muse; Winner of RuPaul's Drag Race Season Thirteen: Symone

== Ratings ==
Viewership and ratings per episode of RuPaul's Drag Race season 13
No.	Title	Air date	Rating (18–49)	Viewers (millions)	DVR (18–49)	DVR viewers (millions)	Total (18–49)	Total viewers (millions)
1	"The Pork Chop"	January 1, 2021	0.24	0.561	0.13	—N/a	0.37	—N/a
2	"Condragulations"	January 8, 2021	0.26	0.634	0.21	—N/a	0.47	—N/a
3	"Phenomenon"	January 15, 2021	0.25	0.611	0.21	0.383	0.46	0.994
4	"RuPaulmark Channel"	January 22, 2021	0.23	0.594	0.17	—N/a	0.40	—N/a
5	"The Bag Ball"	January 29, 2021	0.22	0.609	—N/a	—N/a	—N/a	—N/a
6	"Disco-mentary"	February 5, 2021	0.21	0.585	0.22	0.461	0.43	1.046
7	"Bossy Rossy: The RuBoot"	February 12, 2021	0.21	0.500	—N/a	—N/a	—N/a	—N/a
8	"Social Media: The Unverified Rusical"	February 19, 2021	0.25	0.605	0.24	—N/a	0.49	—N/a
9	"Snatch Game"	March 5, 2021	0.24	0.582	0.17	—N/a	0.41	—N/a
10	"Freaky Friday Queens"	March 12, 2021	0.26	0.638	0.19	0.427	0.45	1.065
11	"Pop! Goes The Queens"	March 19, 2021	0.24	0.582	—N/a	—N/a	—N/a	—N/a
12	"Nice Girls Roast"	March 26, 2021	0.26	0.610	—N/a	—N/a	—N/a	—N/a
13	"Henny, I Shrunk The Drag Queens!"	April 2, 2021	0.22	0.558	—N/a	—N/a	—N/a	—N/a
14	"Gettin' Lucky!"	April 9, 2021	0.24	0.623	0.19	0.449	0.43	1.072
15	"Reunited"	April 16, 2021	0.20	0.479	0.14	0.370	0.34	0.849
16	"Grand Finale"	April 23, 2021	0.32	0.772	0.15	0.437	0.47	1.209
