= Teenage Dirtbag (film) =

- Directed by: Regina Crosby
- Written by: Regina Crosby
- Produced by: Chris Aagaard; Seth Caplan
- Starring: Scott Michael Foster; Noa Hegesh; Regina Crosby
- Cinematography: Armando Ballesteros
- Edited by: Andrea Trillo
- Release date: October 20, 2009
- Running time: 98 minutes
- Country: United States
- Language: English

Teenage Dirtbag is a 2009 drama film written and directed by Regina Crosby and starring Scott Michael Foster and Noa Hegesh. The film is distributed by Vivendi Entertainment and Lightyear Entertainment.

== Plot ==
At an Idaho IGA store, a pregnant woman named Amber Lange runs into an old classmate and learns that Thayer Mangeres, a boy they went to school with, recently died after jumping into a river. Shaken, Amber reflects and flashes back to her days in high school as an unhappy but popular cheerleader and her interactions with Thayer, a “problem kid”. Because of their last names, they were often seated next to each other in class. In science class, Thayer drinks the blood of a dead fetal pig in an effort to impress his fellow students. Instead of being impressed, Amber is disgusted by Thayer, and tells him that she thinks nothing of him. Her casual dismissal sets Thayer on a course to make Amber's life miserable. Thayer begins to harass Amber in their shared classes. When a new student named Tabitha arrives, he soon strikes up a relationship with her and they taunt Amber together. Amber reports Thayer's actions to the teacher and he is sent to the school principal. After school, Thayer returns home and his father whips him with his belt as punishment while his brother Dooley holds him down.

Thayer starts to reveal his pain through his poems in Creative Writing class. Amber, sharing the experience of a loveless home life due to her parents often being absent, picks up on the subtle messages in Thayer's written work. Amber silently offers Thayer an orange later that day during Study Hall, and this opens the door to the pair developing a very private friendship. Through poems read aloud in class, Thayer and Amber exchange intense feelings for one another. Amber experiences ongoing social pressure, rejection and abandonment at home, while Thayer's problems escalate when he cannot protect his older sister Jeannie from violence and sexual abuse at home. As the weeks pass, Thayer confides his secrets to Amber in a notebook they share in study hall. The pair become closer, leaning on one another during dark times, until one night when Thayer secretly watches Amber have sex with a boy at a party. Feeling betrayed, Thayer takes revenge the following day by reading an insulting poem about Amber to the class.

To spite Thayer, Amber pulls out the private notebook full of secrets that she shares with Thayer and throws it onto Tabitha's desk. After reading a few pages, Tabitha runs out of the classroom and the notebook is quickly passed around, humiliating Thayer and exposing his private messages to the whole school. The following day, Thayer takes pills in class in front of Amber; she doesn't believe him when he says they are drugs, but he overdoses and has a seizure. After the overdose, Thayer never returns to school and Amber's world returns to normal. A year later, while shopping, Amber sees Thayer again but almost doesn't recognize him, as he has become a Mormon missionary. Months later, Amber meets Thayer again at the beach. She questions him about his Mormon mission and he informs her that he left early. Eventually, Amber informs him that she is getting married; Thayer changes the subject and says it would be easy to fake his own death, though Amber claims she would know he wasn't dead. Later that night, Thayer follows Amber into the bathroom of a movie theatre and asks her to admit her feelings for him. For a split second, they come close to professing their love to each other, but she denies him and leaves.

In the present day, Amber learns that Thayer's father and brother both died in suspicious accidents. She wonders if Thayer just faked his own death as he had mentioned before. Searching for answers, she visits Thayer's home to find his sister Jeannie still lives there alone. Accepting that she will never know whether Thayer is truly dead, she visits their old high school and returns to her seat in Study Hall where she and Thayer once shared happy memories. Amber pulls out the notebook, revealing that she has kept it all of these years. She writes a long passage and passes it to Thayer's old seat. Later, Jeannie is standing in the doorway of a hospital room, smiling with tears in her eyes as she looks upon Amber holding her newborn baby boy, who she has named Thayer.
