= Getting Off =

Getting Off may refer to:

- "Getting Off" (CSI), a fourth-season episode of television series CSI: Crime Scene Investigation
- "Getting Off", a song by Korn from See You on the Other Side

== See also ==
- Get Off (disambiguation)
- "Gett Off", a 1991 song by Prince
- "Get It Off", a song by American hip hop singer Monica from her 2003 album After the Storm
