= Tamisha Iman =

American drag performer

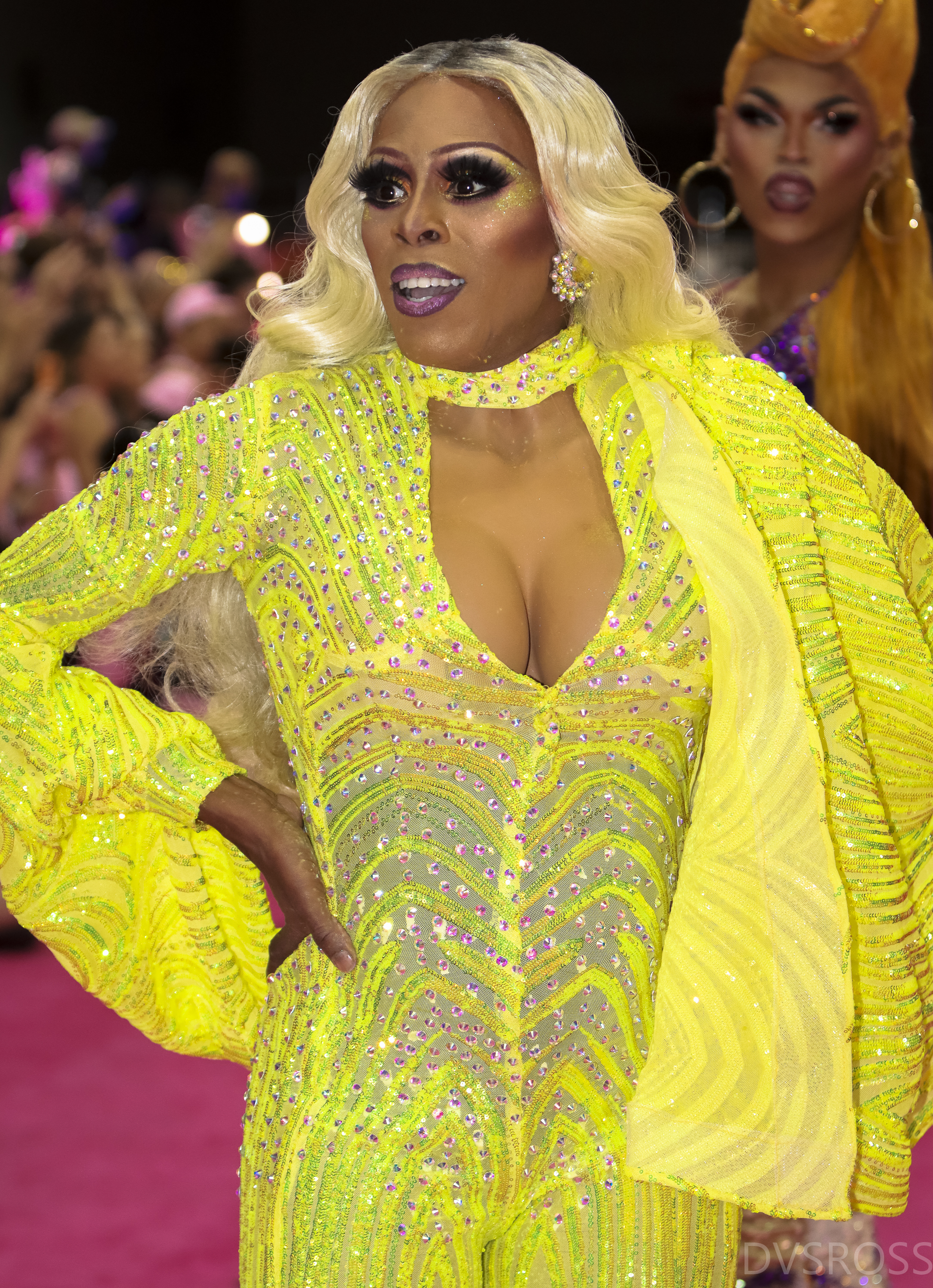
- Tamisha Iman at RuPaul's DragCon LA, 2022
- Born: Will Crawford; Birmingham, Alabama, U.S.
- Occupations: Drag queen; costume designer
- Television: RuPaul's Drag Race (season 13)
- Title: Miss National 1996; Miss Black Universe 2000; Miss GayUSofA 2005
- Children: 3

Tamisha Iman is the stage name of Will Crawford, an American drag queen most known for competing on the thirteenth season of RuPaul's Drag Race and winning several drag pageants. She is a drag matriarch and the founder of the Iman Dynasty, a drag house. Tamisha Iman is one of the longest working drag queens, with a career spanning over 30 years.

== Early life ==
Crawford was born in Birmingham, Alabama.

== Career ==
Tamisha Iman is a drag performer who was cast for season 13 of RuPaul's Drag Race. She had originally been selected to compete in season 12, but had to cancel in order to receive radiation therapy for colon cancer. She competed at the age of 49, wearing an ostomy bag. Tamisha Iman was eliminated on the season's sixth episode. Jordan Robledo of Gay Times called her a "standout talent".

Tamisha Iman has competed in many drag pageants and received titles, including Miss Black Universe and Miss GayUSofA. She creates most of her outfits and does her own hair and makeup. Among her drag "children" are Tandi Iman Dupree and fellow Drag Race contestant LaLa Ri. Iman also "adopted" fellow Drag Race contestant Kahmora Hall into her drag family. She has supported approximately 80 "drag children". Tamisha Iman has been described as a "drag veteran" and a "legend".

== Personal life ==
Crawford lives in Atlanta, and has previously lived in Dallas and New Orleans. He has experienced homelessness, and survived colon cancer. Crawford had three biological children before turning 18, while still in high school. One of his children, Tamisha, is the inspiration for Tamisha Iman's first name.

== Filmography ==
=== Television ===
Year	Title	Role	Notes	Ref
2021	RuPaul's Drag Race (season 13)	Herself	Contestant (11th)	
2021	RuPaul's Drag Race: Untucked	Herself	Contestant (11th)	
2021	RuPaul's Drag Race: Corona Can't Keep a Good Queen Down	Herself	Stand-alone special	

=== Web series ===
Year	Title	Role	Notes	Ref
2021	Whatcha Packin'	Herself	Guest	
2021	Drag Makeup Tutorial	Herself	Guest	
2021	The X Change Rate	Herself	Guest	

== Awards and nominations ==
Year	Award-giving body	Category	Work	Results	Ref.
2021	MTV Movie & TV Awards	Best Fight (with Kandy Muse)	RuPaul's Drag Race: Untucked	Nominated	
