= Get Off (Foxy song) =

Single by Foxy

from the album Get Off
- B-side: "You Make Me Hot"
- Released: July 1978
- Recorded: 1978
- Genre: Disco
- Length: 4:03
- Label: Dash/ TK Records
- Songwriters: Carl Driggs, Ish Ledesma
- Producer: Cory Wade

Foxy singles chronology
| "The Way You Do the Things You Do" (1977) | "Get Off" (1978) | "Hot Number" (1979) |

"Get Off" is a song by American disco band Foxy, released in 1978. The background vocals were performed by Wildflower. Released from their LP of the same name, the song became a crossover hit. It spent two weeks at number one on the Billboard Hot Soul Singles chart during the fall of that year and also peaked at number nine on the Billboard Hot 100 singles chart. Along with the track, "Tena's Song", "Get Off" peaked at number 18 on the disco chart.

== Chart performance ==
| Chart (1978) | Peak position |
|---|---|
| US Billboard Hot 100 | 9 |
| US Billboard National Disco Action Top 40 | 18 |
| US Billboard Hot Soul Singles | 1 |
