= Fascinated (Company B song) =

Single by Company B

from the album Company B
- Released: 1986
- Recorded: 1986
- Genre: Freestyle; electropop
- Length: 3:50 (single); 5:24 (album); 7:33 (12" club mix)
- Label: Atlantic
- Songwriter: Ish Ledesma
- Producer: Ish Ledesma

"Fascinated" is a song by the freestyle girl group Company B. It was the first single released off their 1987 self-titled debut album. It was written and produced by Ish Ledesma, mixed by Ciro llerenea and Randy Miller and released by Atlantic Records.

The song topped the US Billboard Dance Club Songs chart in March 1987 and remained there for four weeks. Soon after, the single was picked up by Top 40 radio, and it charted on the Billboard Hot 100 spending eight weeks in the Top 40 in May and June 1987, peaking at #21. It became Company B's most successful hit single in the U.S. and is one of the first freestyle songs to enter the Top 40 on the Billboard Hot 100.

== Legacy ==
"Fascinated" has been covered by other recording artists, such as Lisa B, the American-born singer Suzanne Palmer, the Canadian singer Emjay, and Nigerian singer Carol Jiani.

In 2021, "Fascinated" was featured on episode nine of RuPaul's Drag Race's thirteenth season in a lip sync between Utica Queen and Elliott with 2 Ts.

== Charts ==
=== Weekly charts ===
Weekly chart performance for "Fascinated"
Chart (1987)	Peak position
Netherlands (Dutch Top 40 Tipparade)	2
Netherlands (Single Top 100)	23
UK Singles (Official Charts)	89
US Billboard Hot 100	21
US Dance Club Songs (Billboard)	1
US Dance Singles Sales (Billboard)	1

=== Year-end charts ===
Year-end chart performance for "Fascinated"
Chart (1987)	Position
US Dance Club Songs (Billboard)	12
US Dance Singles Sales (Billboard)	3

== See also ==
- List of number-one dance hits (United States)
