= Ish Ledesma =

American songwriter

- Born: Ismael Angel Ledesma; October 2, 1952 (age 73); Cuba
- Genres: Latin funk, disco
- Instruments: Guitar, vocals
- Years active: 1970–present
- Labels: TK Records; Geffen/Warner Bros. Records
- Formerly of: OXO
- Website: www.ishledesma.com

Ismael Angel Ledesma (born October 2, 1952) professionally known as Ish Ledesma is an American, Miami-based singer, songwriter, musician, and producer. Ledesma has fronted, written for, or produced hits for the bands Foxy, Oxo, and Company B. Both Oxo and Company B were one-hit wonders in the US, with respective hits "Whirly Girl" and "Fascinated"; Foxy released several albums and singles, including the number one R&B hit "Get Off".

== Early years ==
Ish Ledesma was born in Cuba and migrated to Miami as a child. He was influenced by the ubiquitous Latin sounds, popular within his community. He also enjoyed the rock and roll revolution that was playing out both nationally and internationally. In the early 1970s, Ledesma was hired by Henry Stone as a session artist. His credits include guitar on Gwen McCrae's disco hit "Rockin' Chair".

=== Foxy ===
In 1976, Ledesma convinced Stone to record a band he was forming, resulting in the band Foxy's release of their self-titled debut album. The album, produced by Ray Martínez, had two 12" singles released, "People Fall In Love While Dancing" and "Let's Love." Both songs were regional hits, but with only minor appeal nationally. However, the band's follow-up album, Get Off was a major breakthrough, featuring the title track, which went to number one on the R&B chart and also cracked the top ten on the pop chart. Although the group would score another hit the following year with the tune "Hot Number," follow-up releases were less successful. Foxy disbanded early in the 1980s, as disco began to wane.

== Solo career and other projects ==
Ish Ledesma had embarked on a solo career in 1979, releasing his own self-titled debut on TK Records. The album featured a hit with the release of the 12" single, "Don't Stop." Ledesma would release a second solo album in 1986 called On This Corner on Geffen/Warner Bros. Records, which was produced by John Robie. Ledesma spent the years between the solo releases doing studio appearances as a session artist, and expanding his endeavors into production aspects. He is credited on ABBA's Voulez Vous, Miami Sound Machine's "Bad Boy," Latimore's "Goodbye Heartaches," and Fred Schneider's "Monster". He also either produced, or composed the hit songs "Something Tells Me", by Tiger Moon, "Through The Night" by Blue Moderne, and "Be Mine Tonight" by Promise Circle. In the early 1980s, Ledesma formed the band Oxo, who scored a minor hit with "Whirly Girl." Ish Ledesma is also distinguished as having written and produced two one hit wonders with the songs "Fascinated", by Company B, and the aforementioned "Whirly Girl" by Oxo. These accomplishments secured Ledesma's role in disco music as an important part of its history.

As of 2013, Ish Ledesma remains an active musician, currently appearing mostly within the Florida area.
