= Company B (band) =

American Latin freestyle trio

- Origin: Miami, United States
- Genre: Freestyle
- Years active: 1986–1998, 2006–present
- Labels: Atlantic Records, The Summer Records
- Members: Susan Gonzalez Johnson; Dalia Chirino; Siddy Betancourt
- Past members: Charlotte McKinnon; Lori L. (Ledesma); Lezlee Livrano; Sheena B. Donna Huntley; Julie Marie

Company B is an American Latin freestyle trio formed in 1986 by Cuban-American producer Ish "Angel" Ledesma, featuring members Lori L. (Ledesma), Charlotte McKinnon and Susan (Gonzalez) Johnson. Before the group's self-titled album was released, Charlotte McKinnon left and was replaced by Lezlee Livrano.

After the group's self-titled debut album, Susan Johnson left and was replaced by Sheena B. For the group's second album, 1989's Gotta Dance, Sheena B. and Lezlee Livrano both left the group and were replaced by Donna Huntley and Julie Marie (who also was a rotating performer with Exposé).

== Overview ==
Company B resulted from the music trend of producer-driven girl groups in the late 1980s and early 1990s, most successfully the group Exposé. In 1986, Company B's first single "Fascinated" was released on the independent label The Summer. The song created so much buzz in clubs around Miami that it soon made its way to local radio stations. This led to its being picked up and re-released by Atlantic records.

With a much wider distribution due to major label (Atlantic Records) backing, "Fascinated" received significant radio and club airplay in all major cities throughout the U.S. It reached number one on the U.S. Hot Dance Club Play chart and crossed over to pop radio, peaking at number 21 on the Billboard Hot 100. Today, it is regarded as a freestyle classic.

The trio was best known for this single, as well as the platinum wigs that were initially a part of the group's image. The single did so well that the group was signed to do a full-length album. The album was released in 1987 on Atlantic Records. Although subsequent releases "Full Circle," "Perfect Lover," and "Signed in Your Book of Love" received club play and led to appearances on such programs as Showtime at the Apollo, the songs received little airplay on American radio.

In 1989, Company B released its follow-up album Gotta Dance, sporting a revamped image: gone were the platinum wigs. Also seemingly gone were the Latin-flavored rhythms of the previous album. Singles culled from the album included the house-influenced "You Stole My Heart," "Gotta Dance," and a cover of the Andrews Sisters song "Boogie Woogie Bugle Boy", the song that served as inspiration of the group's name. Despite music videos for "You Stole My Heart" and "Boogie Woogie Bugle Boy," the group did not attain the same success as they did with their debut effort. A third album recycled a few songs from the first album, including the track "Jam on Me," which included additional lyrics.

In 2006, Company B regrouped, with original member Charlotte McKinnon and original member Susan (Gonzalez) Johnson, joined by newest member Rachel Leslie. They had been performing extensively over the past few years and released new material.

In 2014, original member Susan (Johnson) Gonzalez purchased the Trademark, Company B and is registered with the USPTO.

In 2016, Susan (Johnson) Gonzalez hired Gail Smith Hoyer to manage the group. Gail assisted Susan in branding the name, hire new member Siddy Betancourt, update costumes, choreography, and music. In 2017, they made a remake of "Cruel Summer" by Bananarama. Gail came up with the idea of an online show "In the Kitchen" with Company B and together with Susan they put it into action. Later that year Company B parted ways with Gail and hired new manager Roy Bermingham (Roy B).

In 2019, members included original member Susan (Johnson) Gonzalez, Dalia Chirinos, and Siddy Benancourt.

== Discography ==
=== Albums ===
Year	Album	Billboard 200
1987	Company B	143
1989	Gotta Dance	—
1996	3	—
1996	Jam on Me	—
1998	Irresistible (re-released in 2011 as Goddess of Love)	—
"—" denotes releases that did not chart.

=== Singles ===
Year	Single	Peak chart positions			
Year	Single	US Dance	US Pop	NL	UK
1986	"Fascinated" (first release)	—	—	—	—
1986	"Jam on Me"	—	—	―	―
1987	"Fascinated" (re-release)	1	21	23	89
1987	"Full Circle"	5	―	―	―
1988	"Perfect Lover"	12	—	―	—
1988	"Signed in Your Book of Love"	9	—	―	—
1989	"You Stole My Heart"	—	—	―	—
1989	"Boogie Woogie Bugle Boy"	―	—	—	―
1990	"Goddess of Love"	―	—	—	―
2009	"Soldier Boy"	―	—	―	―
2017	"Cruel Summer"	―	―	―	—
2019	"Last Christmas"	―	―	―	—
2022	"Let's Just Dance"	―	―	―	—
"—" denotes releases that did not chart or were not released in that territory.

== See also ==
- List of Billboard number-one dance club songs
- List of artists who reached number one on the U.S. Dance Club Songs chart
