= Gettin' Lucky (RuPaul's Drag Race) =

- RuPaul's Drag Race episode
- Episode no.: Season 13; Episode 14
- Directed by: Nick Murray
- Original air date: April 9, 2021

Guest appearance
- Jamal Sims

Episode chronology
← Previous "Henny, I Shrunk the Drag Queens!"	Next → "Reunited"

"Gettin' Lucky" is the fourteenth episode of the thirteenth season of the American television series RuPaul's Drag Race. It originally aired on April 9, 2021. The episode's main challenge tasks the remaining four contestants (Gottmik, Kandy Muse, Rosé, and Symone) with performing to RuPaul's song "Lucky". Jamal Sims is a guest choreographer.

After facing off in a lip-sync contest to "I Learned from the Best (HQ2 Radio Mix)" by Whitney Houston, none of the contestants are eliminated from the competition. The episode earned Nick Murray a win in the Outstanding Directing for a Reality Program category at the 73rd Primetime Creative Arts Emmy Awards.

== Episode ==
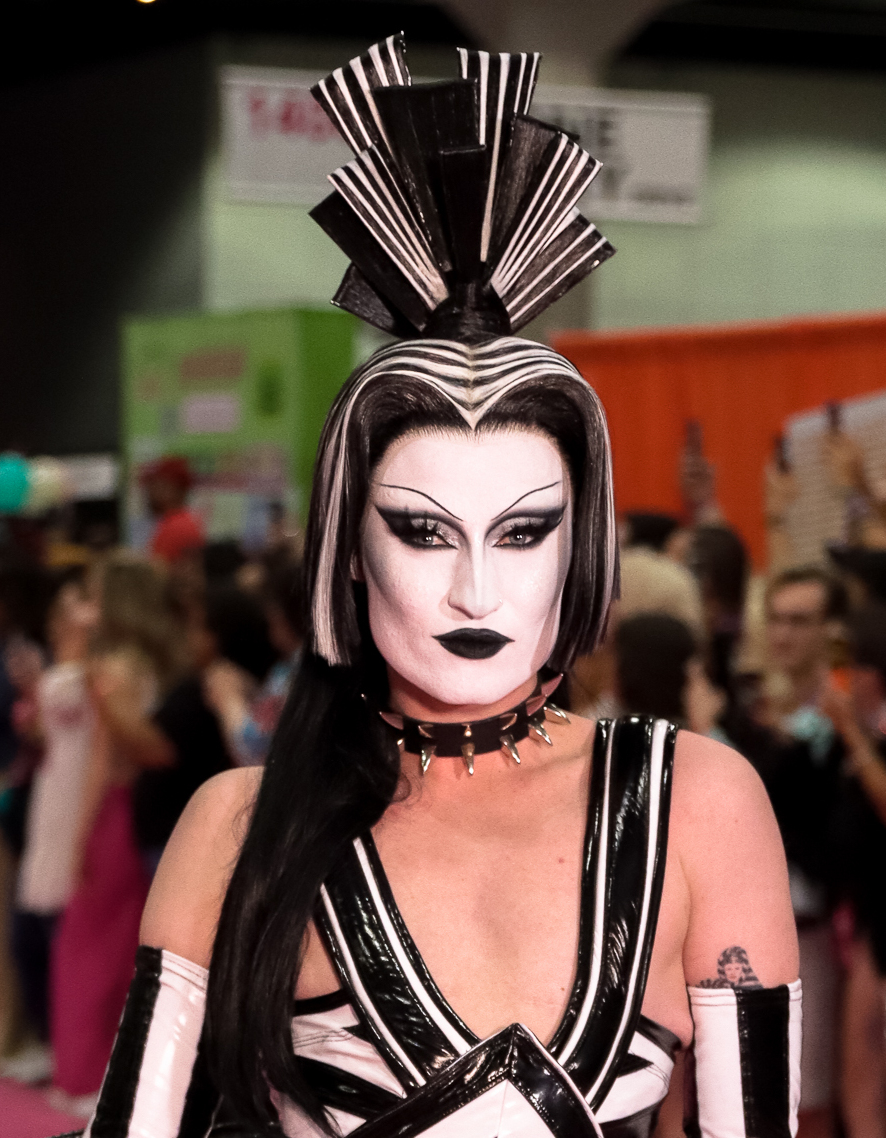
Gottmik

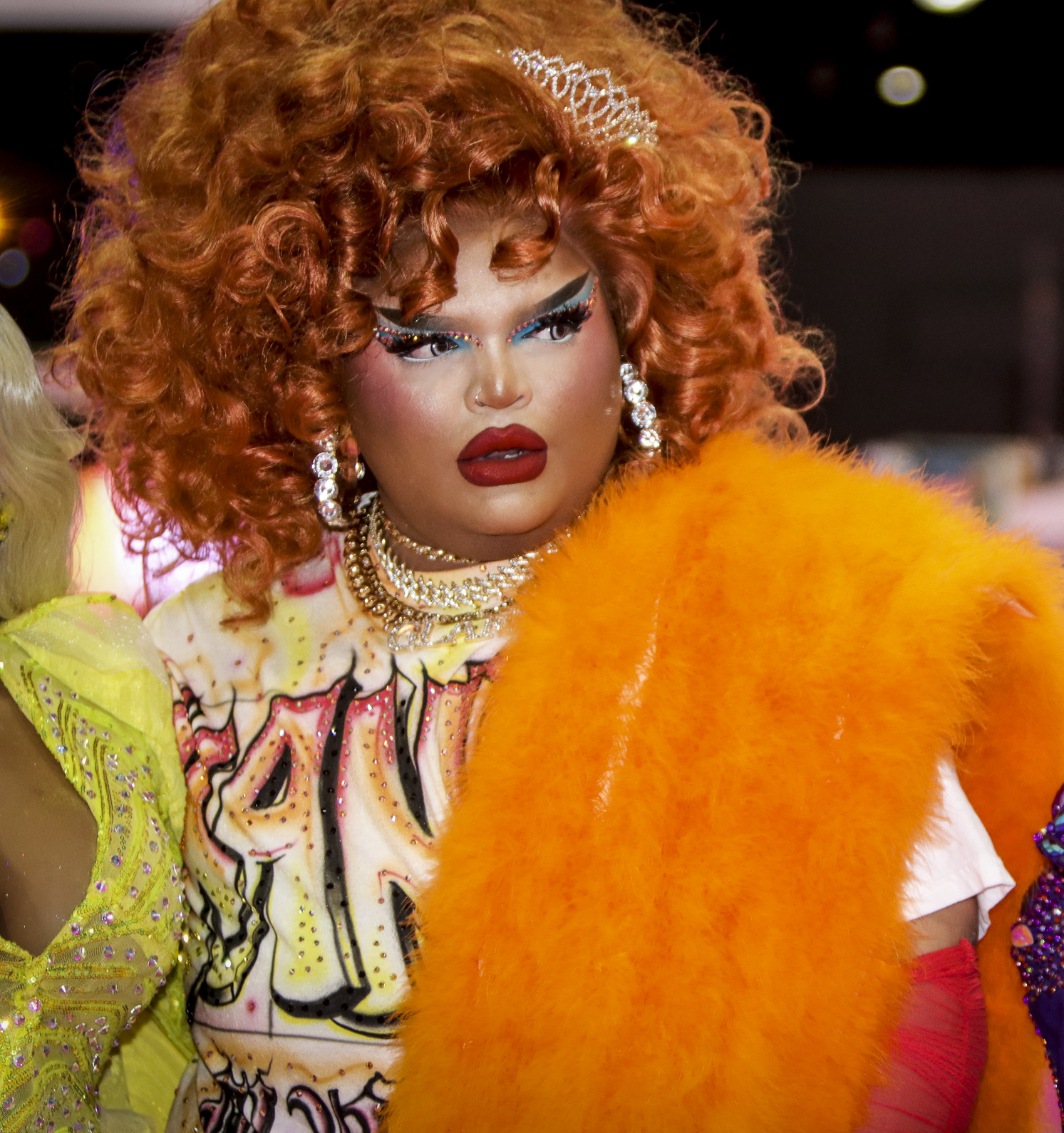
Kandy Muse

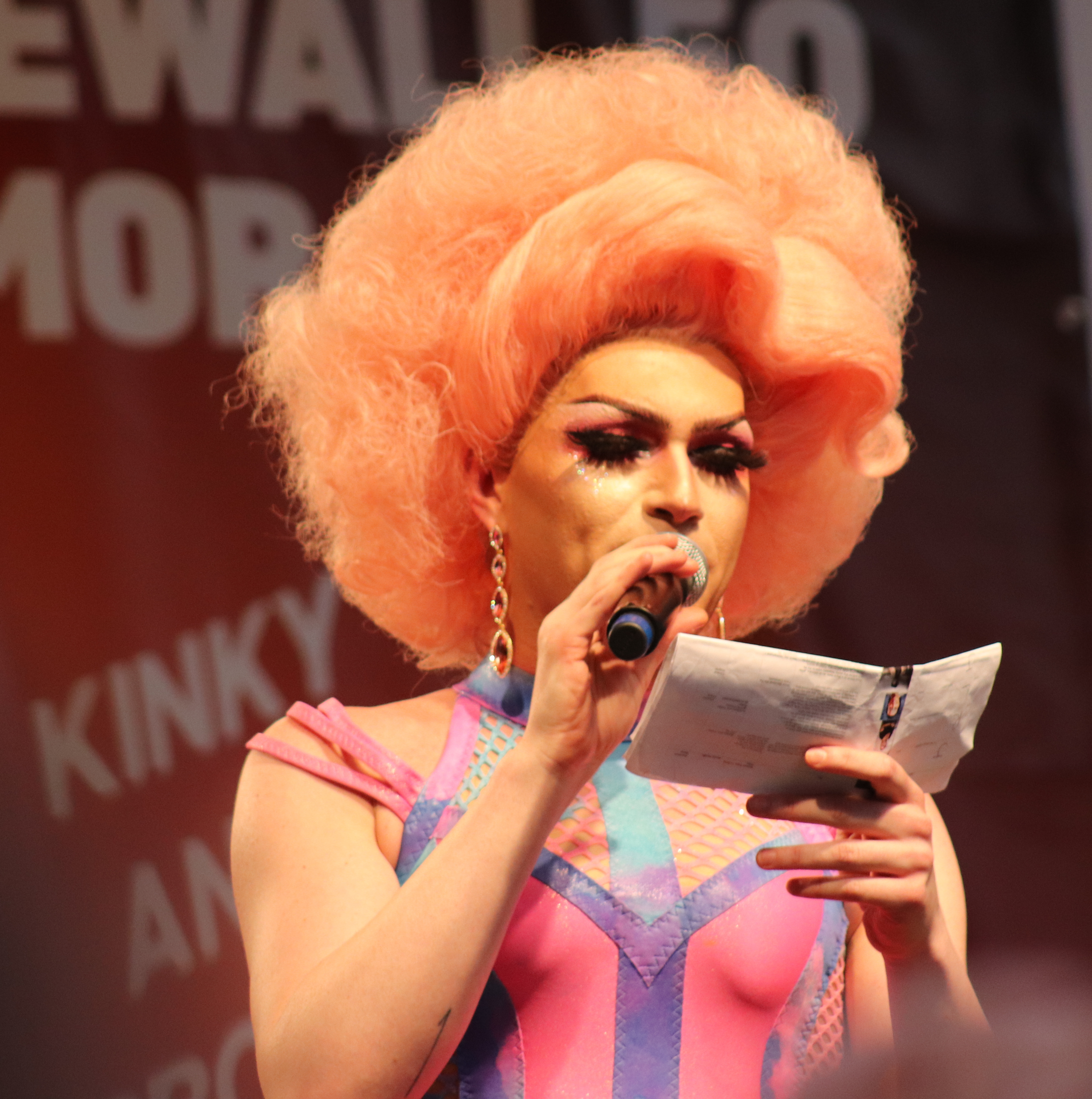
Rosé

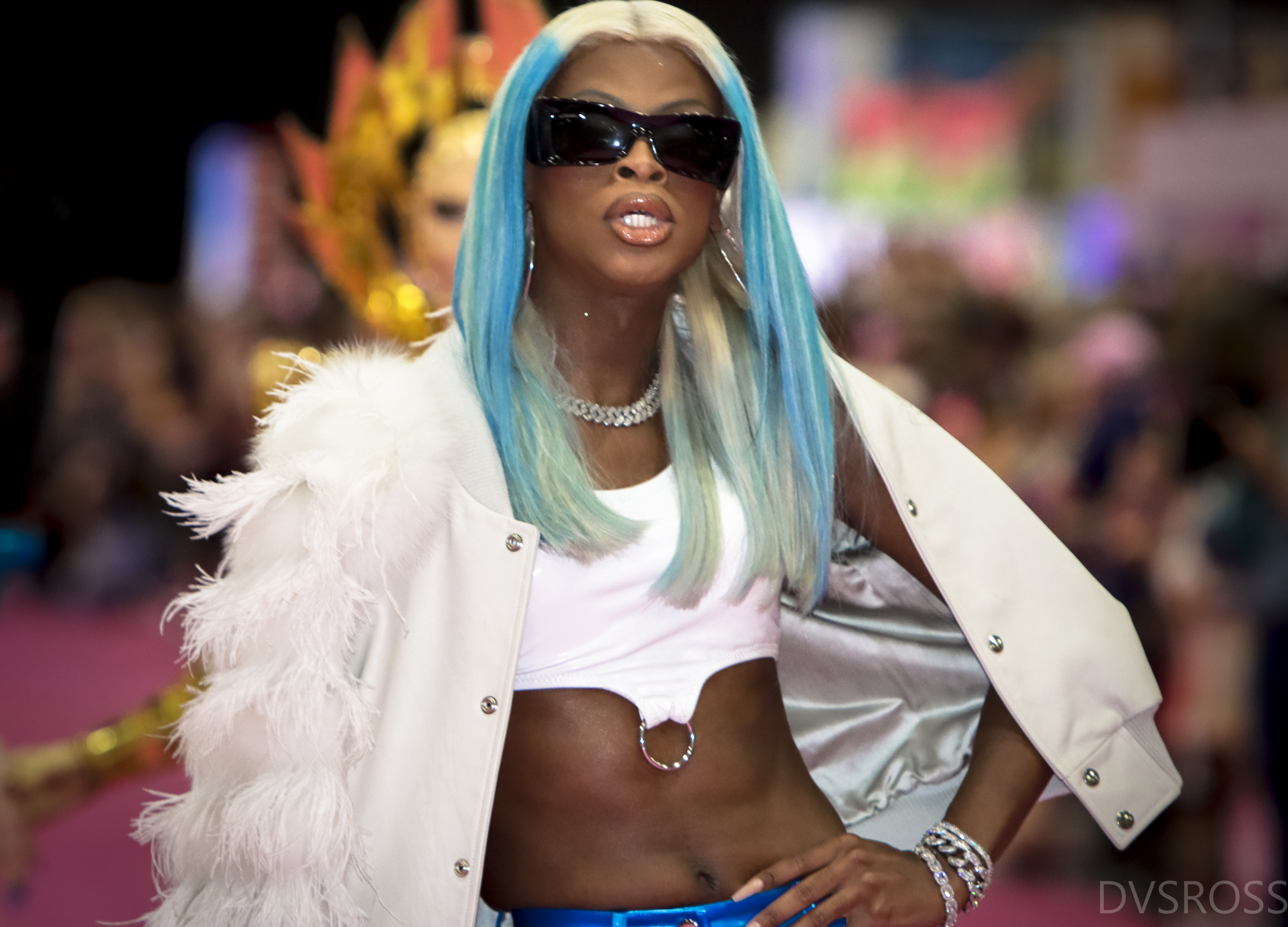
Symone

The four finalists competing in the last challenge of the thirteenth season.

The remaining four contestants—Gottmik, Kandy Muse, Rosé, and Symone—return to the Werk Room after the elimination of Olivia Lux on the previous episode. RuPaul greets the group and reveals the season's final challenge, which tasks contestants with writing, recording verses for, and performing choreography in the debut of RuPaul's song "Lucky". RuPaul says they will rehearse with guest choreographer Jamal Sims. RuPaul also invites the contestants to join him and Michelle Visage for one-on-one interviews.

During her interview with RuPaul and Visage, Gottmik discusses her drag name, gender transition, and progress throughout the competition. Rosé talks about her backgrounds in theatre and drag, as well as her relationship with her family and her aspirations. Kandy Muse discusses the name of her drag persona and her experiences during the competition. Symone shares about how she joined the House of Avalon and the reasons for her shyness, especially out of drag. Sims coaches the contestants on the main stage. In the Werk Room, the contestants discuss their first impressions of each other and their experiences in the competition as they prepare for the runway.

On the main stage, RuPaul welcomes fellow judges Visage, Carson Kressley, and Ross Mathews. The contestants perform "Lucky". The runway category is "Drag Excellence". The judges deliver their final critiques. RuPaul asks each of the contestants to share some words of wisdom to their younger selves, then requests all four to face off in a lip-sync to "I Learned from the Best (HQ2 Radio Mix)" by Whitney Houston. None of the contestants are eliminated from the competition, and all are declared as season finalists.

== Production ==
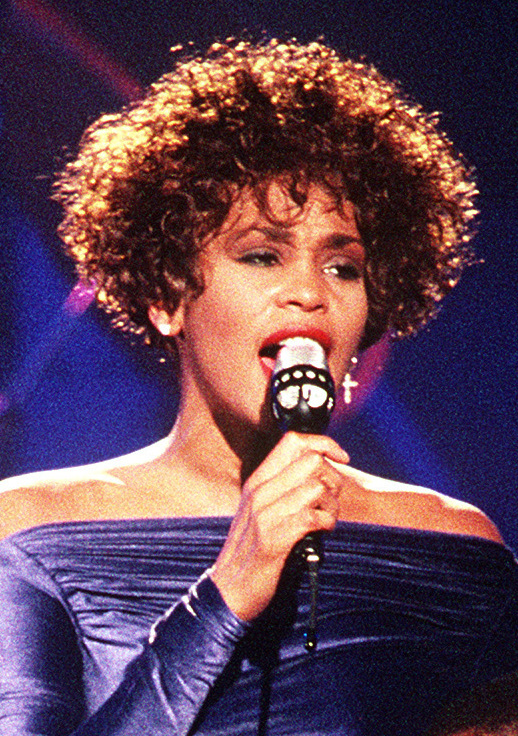
For the season's final lip-sync contest, the remaining four contestants perform to "I Learned from the Best (HQ2 Radio Mix)" by Whitney Houston (pictured in 1991).

The episode was directed by Nick Murray and originally aired on April 9, 2021.

Sims appeared on the show several times before "Gettin' Lucky". He was a guest judge and choreographer on the eighth season's "Bitch Perfect" (2016), the twelfth season's "Viva Drag Vegas" (2020), and the thirteenth season's "Condragulations" and "Social Media: The Unverified Rusical" (2021). He was solely guest choreographer on the seventh season's "Glamazonian Airways" (2015) and the twelfth season's "Madonna: The Unauthorized Rusical" (2020). On the sixth season (2021) of RuPaul's Drag Race All Stars, Sims was a guest judge and choreographer on "Halftime Headliners" and solely a guest choreographer on the finale, "This Is Our Country".

=== Fashion ===
During "Lucky", Gottmik, Kandy Muse, Rosé, and Symone appear in rooms illuminated with purple, yellow, pink, and orange lights, respectively. All of the contestants wear outfits to match each color.

For the runway show, Gottmik wears a black-and-white polka dot dress and Kandy Muse presents a mesh outfit. Rosé's tartan gown is inspired by her Scottish ancestry. Symone wears a purple gown with oversized sleeves, as well as cornrows.

== Reception ==
Kate Kulzick of The A.V. Club gave the episode a rating of 'A'. In a review of a subsequent episode, Kevin O’Keeffe of Xtra Magazine wrote about Gottmik: "The argument against Gottmik going into a Lip Sync for the Crown finale was that, despite never technically losing a lip sync, wagering on her performance ability is a tough bet. Nothing she demonstrated in either her 'Rumors' premiere performance or the solo lip sync in the top four episode to H20's 'I Learned From the Best' remix was at the level required to win a Lip Sync for the Crown."

"Gettin' Lucky" earned Murray a win in the Outstanding Directing for a Reality Program category at the 73rd Primetime Creative Arts Emmy Awards.

== See also ==
- RuPaul discography
