= Glamazonian Airways =

- RuPaul's Drag Race episode
- Episode no.: Season 7 Episode 2
- Directed by: Nick Murray
- Original air date: March 9, 2015

Guest appearances
- Moby; Olivia Newton-John; Jamal Sims; Jordin Sparks

Episode chronology
← Previous "Born Naked"	Next → "ShakesQueer"
- RuPaul's Drag Race (season 7)

"Glamazonian Airways" is the second episode of the seventh season of the American television series RuPaul's Drag Race. It originally aired on March 9, 2015, and features a Rusical (musical theatre challenge). Olivia Newton-John and Jordin Sparks are guest judges, alongside regular panelists RuPaul, Michelle Visage, and Carson Kressley. Moby and Jamal Sims also make guest appearances, the former to help judge the mini-challenge and the latter to offer choreography coaching to contestants for the main challenge.

Ginger Minj and Trixie Mattel win the episode's mini-challenge. Ginger Minj also wins the main challenge, and Sasha Belle is eliminated from the competition after placing in the bottom two and losing a lip-sync against Katya to "Twist of Fate" by Newton-John.

== Episode ==
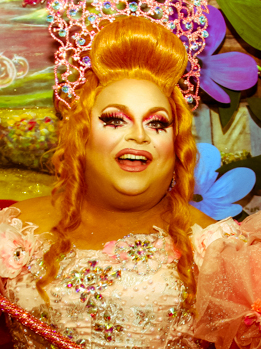
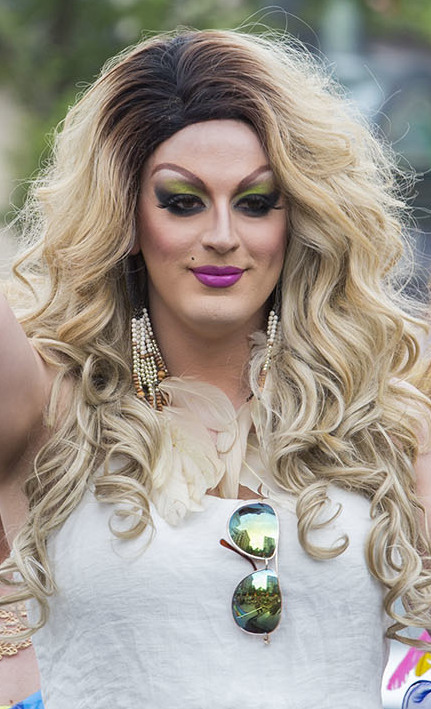
Ginger Minj (left) was a winner of the episode's mini-challenge as well as the main challenge; Sasha Belle (right) was eliminated from the competition.

In the Werk Room, RuPaul greets the contestants and reveals the mini-challenge, which tasks contestants with "giving face" while members of the Pit Crew use a leaf blower. Moby makes a guest appearance to help judge the mini-challenge. Ginger Minj and Trixie Mattel are declared the winners, and therefore serve as team captains for the main challenge.

RuPaul introduces the main challenge, which requires the contestants to perform a lip-synced (or spoken word) and choreographed pre-flight safety presentation for Glamazonian Airways. Ginger Minj's team includes Jaidynn Diore Fierce, Jasmine Masters, Kandy Ho, Kennedy Davenport, Mrs. Kasha Davis, and Sasha Belle. Trixie Mattel's team includes Katya, Max, Miss Fame, Pearl, and Violet Chachki. While the two teams decide on roles, RuPaul meets with each group for status updates. The contestants receive choreography coaching from Jamal Sims on the main stage. Back in the Werk Room, the contestants get ready for the runway and discuss which skills they think a good drag performer should have. Later, Miss Fame shares about the experience of losing a family member to murder at a young age.

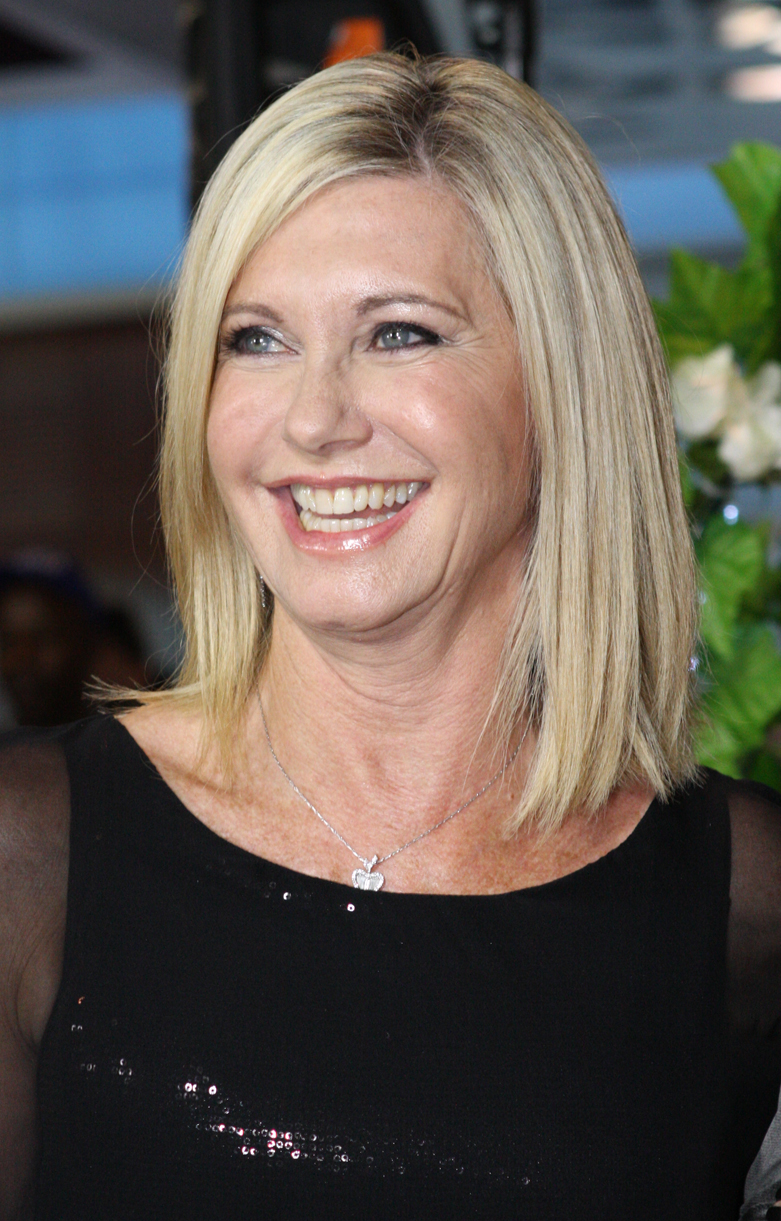
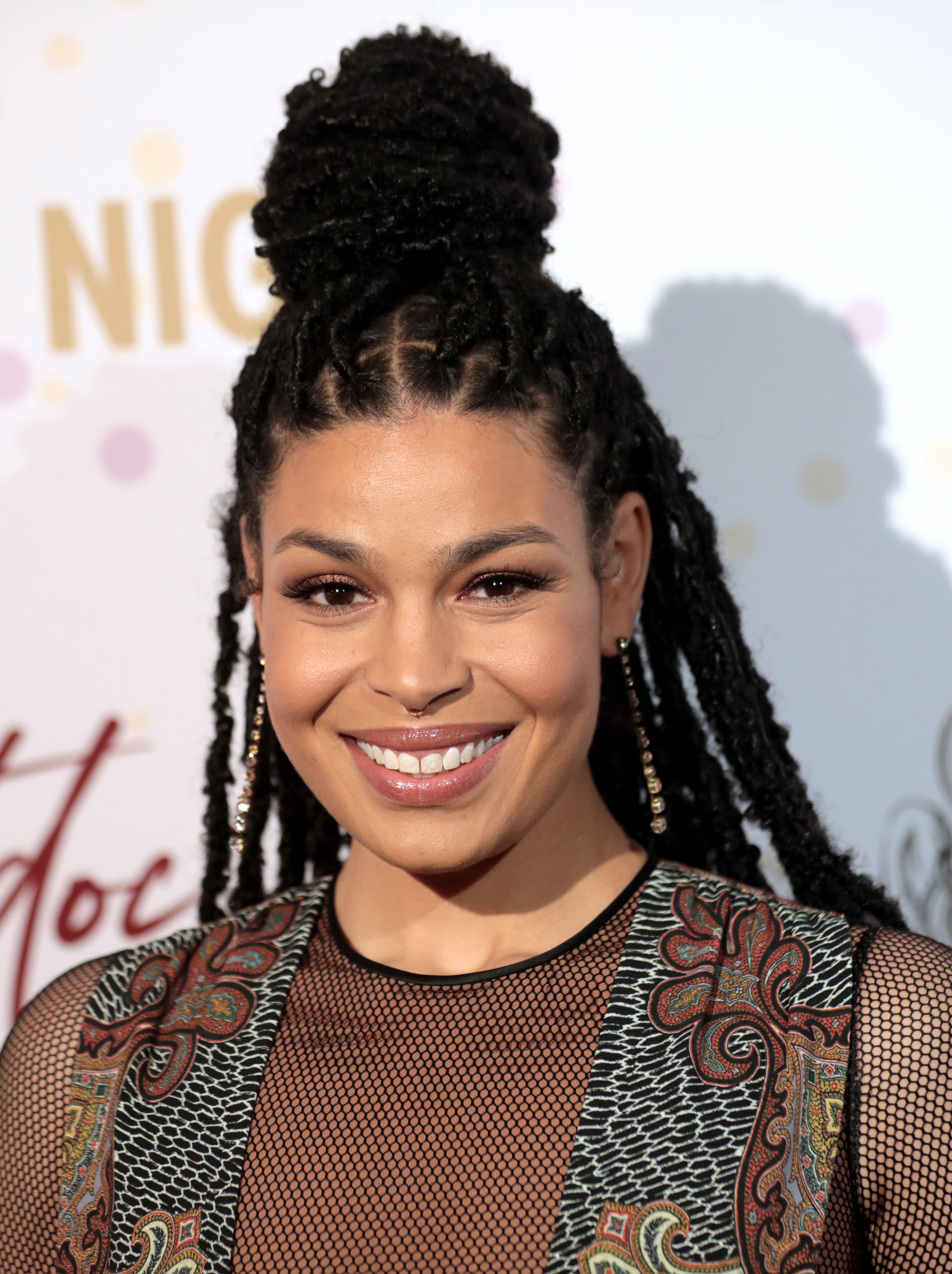
Guest judges Olivia Newton-John (left) and Jordin Sparks (right)

On the main stage, RuPaul welcomes fellow judges Michelle Visage and Carson Kressley, as well as guest judges Olivia Newton-John and Jordin Sparks. The contestants perform the Rusical, which features members of the Pit Crew in the background, for the judges. The runway category is "Jet Set Eleganza", which requires the contestants to present "jet-set" looks. After the contestants present their looks for the judges, RuPaul asks those deemed safe to leave the main stage. The judges speak with the remaining contestants, then RuPaul asks the contestants to leave the main stage so the judges can deliberate.

Ginger Minj is declared the winner of the main challenge, with Mrs. Kasha Davis and Violet Chachki also placing in the top. Katya, Miss Fame, and Sasha Belle place in the bottom three, and Katya and Sasha Belle face off in a lip-sync to "Twist of Fate" (1983) by Newton-John. Sasha Belle is eliminated from the competition. She returns to the Werk Room to write a message on the mirror for the contestants using lipstick.

== Production and broadcast ==
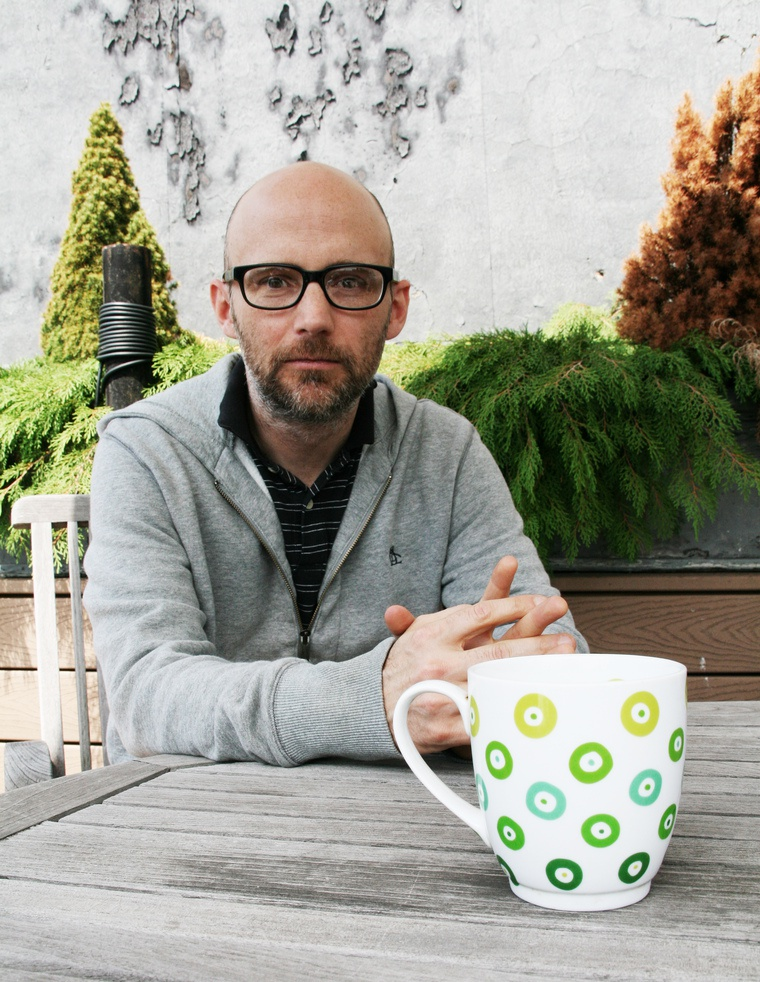
American musician Moby makes a guest appearance, helping to judge the episode's mini-challenge.

"Glamazonian Airways" was directed by Nick Murray. The episode premiered on Logo TV in the United States on March 9, 2015. The episode's premiere was seen by close to 374,000 viewers.

Sims has appeared on the show several times. He was a guest judge and choreographer on the eighth season's "Bitch Perfect" (2016), the twelfth season's "Viva Drag Vegas" (2020), and the thirteenth season's "Condragulations" and "Social Media: The Unverified Rusical" (2021). He was solely guest choreographer on the twelfth season's "Madonna: The Unauthorized Rusical" (2020) and the thirteenth season's "Gettin' Lucky" (2021). On the sixth season (2021) of RuPaul's Drag Race All Stars, Sims was a guest judge and choreographer on "Halftime Headliners" and solely a guest choreographer on the finale "This Is Our Country".

=== Fashion ===
For the fashion show, Trixie Mattel wears a short white dress and she has a headpiece. Katya's outfit has a floral print. Max wears sunglasses and black hat. Pearl also wears sunglasses and she carries a handbag. Violet Chacki carries a bag that matches her outfit. She wears a blonde wig. Miss Fame has red hair. Kandy Ho has a large hat and a bag. Mrs. Kasha Davis has a black-and-white dress. She carries a handbag and sunglasses. Kennedy Davenport's outfit is black with red trim. Sasha Belle has a large blonde wig. Jayden Dior Fierce wears a short dress with a matching hat. Jasmine Masters presents a short black dress. Ginger Minj has a light blue dress and red hair.

On the show's twelfth season, contestant Jan paid tribute to Visage's "Glamazonian Airways" outfit for the runway category "Night of 1000 Michelle Visage's" (episode "Madonna: The Unauthorized Rusical"). Ryan Shea of Instinct said Jan Sport "aced" the runway theme.

== Reception ==
Allison Shoemaker of The A.V. Club, classified the episode with a B+ rating with "still highly entertaining, skimped on the personality in favor of fashion". Bernardo Sim from Out, included the main challenge in a list of fifteen moments "that prove ... season 7 was actually iconic". Writing for Screen Rant in 2019, Sim deemed the episode the season's best and said: "By many standards, season 7's 'Glamazonian Airways' is considered one of the best Rusicals in the entire series, being both funny and quirky. What's more, because it was that season’s second episode, this was a great opportunity for the queens to show off their potential early on." IN Magazine called the episode "ultra campy" in 2018.

In 2022, Sam Damshenas of Gay Times said Mrs. Kasha Davis "dominated" the challenge and said she "should've won, to be honest". In 2024, Stephen Daw ranked "Glamazonian Airways" fourteenth in Billboard's list of the best Rusicals to date. He wrote, "Glamazonian Airways is another rare swing-and-miss among the Rusical challenges. Especially when compared to later entries on this list, this season 7 challenge failed to take off." Barry Levitt ranked "Glamazonian Airways" seventh in Vulture's list of Rusicals and said: "Glamazonian Airways doesn't get enough credit. An entire musical based on flight attendants … doing their jobs is — as Tatiana might say — a choice, but it works surprisingly well. This goofy Rusical is a blast. Beat for beat, it's one of the catchiest Rusicals; just hearing 'when the oxygen mask drops down' is enough to make someone drop it like it's hot." Levitt opined, "You can see the evolution in staging from season six's Shade to 13 queens means it was hard to have many standouts. Ginger Minj was great and a worthy winner, but Mrs. Kasha Davis gave one of the greatest Rusical performances ever, obliterating this challenge as a scatting flight attendant who sings about putting up your tray tables."
