= Social Media: The Unverified Rusical =

- RuPaul's Drag Race episode
- Episode no.: Season 13; Episode 8
- Original air date: February 19, 2021

Guest appearances
- Anne Hathaway; Jamal Sims

Episode chronology
← Previous "Bossy Rossy RuBoot"	Next → "Snatch Game"

"Social Media: The Unverified Rusical" is the eighth episode of the thirteenth season of the American reality competition television series RuPaul's Drag Race, which aired on VH1 on February 19, 2021. The episode's main challenge is a Rusical (musical theatre production) about social media. Choreographer Jamal Sims is a guest judge, and Anne Hathaway also makes a guest appearance.

Rosé wins the main challenge. Kandy Muse and Symone place in the bottom two and face off in a lip-sync contest, but neither is eliminated from the competition.

== Episode ==
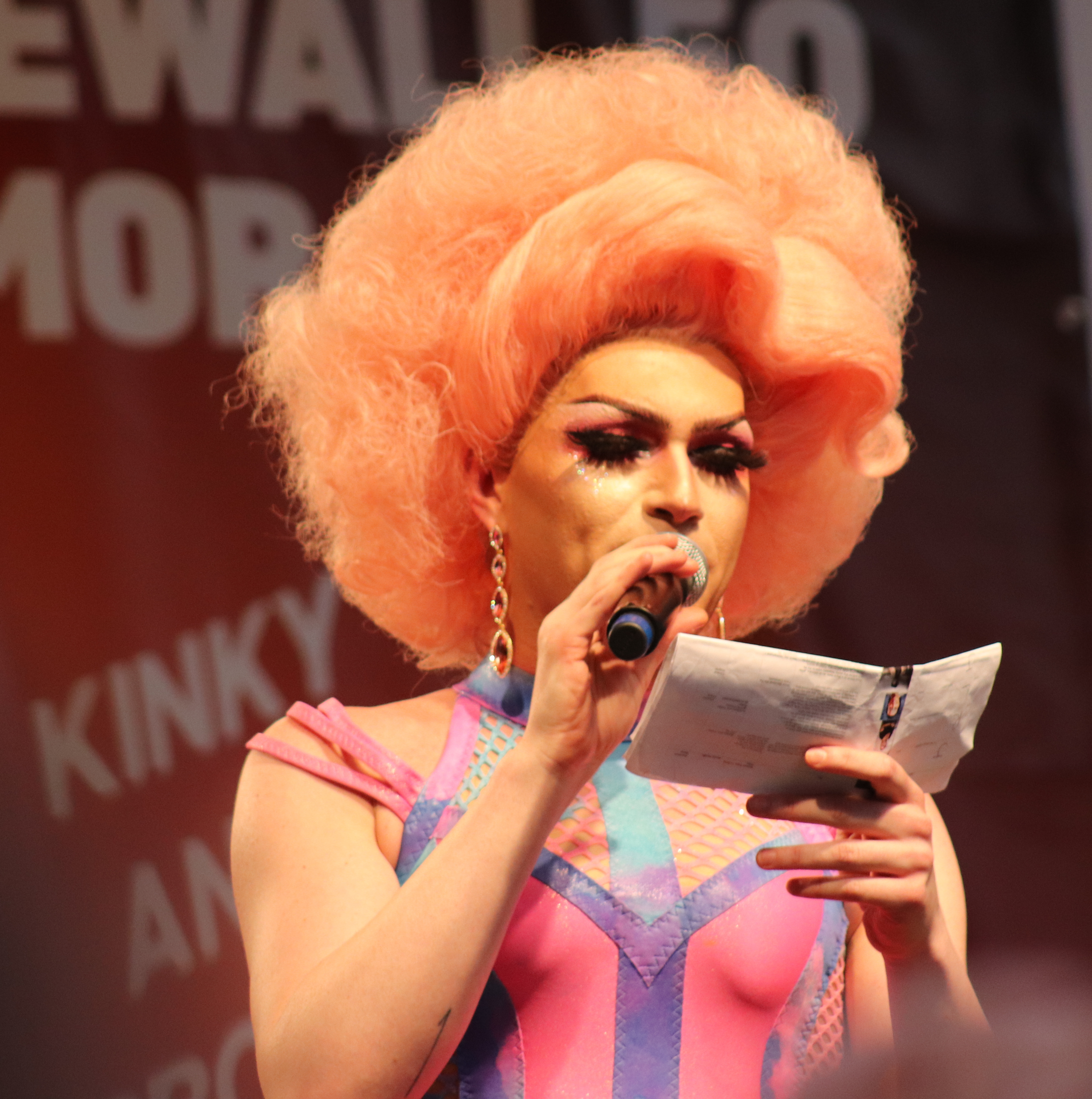
Rosé (pictured in 2019) wins the episode's main challenge.

The episode has contestants perform a Rusical about social media for the main challenge. Jamal Sims is a guest judge, alongside regular panelists RuPaul, Michelle Visage, and Ross Mathews. Anne Hathaway also makes a guest appearance. For the musical, contestants record their own vocals, then dance and lip-sync on the main stage as they portray various social media platforms and other aspects of the internet. Visage assists with the vocal recording process, and choreography is provided by Sims. Following are the contestants and their roles:

- Tina Burner as Emcee and Friendster
- Rosé as Foxy, a non-social media character who sings a parody of "Don't Rain on My Parade" (1964) from Funny Girl
- Olivia Lux as "Markie Tuckenberg", inventor of Facebook
- Symone as "Miss Instaglam" (Instagram)
- Kandy Muse as "Rev. Dr. Mrs. Linked All-the-Way In" (LinkedIn)
- Elliott with 2 Ts as "Miss Toktik" (TikTok)
- Utica Queen as "Lady Tweets" (Twitter)
- Denali and Gottmik as the Russian bots Natasha and Nikita

On the runway, the category is "Yellow, Gorgeous". RuPaul names Rosé the winner of the main challenge. Kandy Muse and Symone place in the bottom two and face off in a lip-sync to "Boss" (2014) by Fifth Harmony, Symone is declared a winner but RuPaul spares Kandy Muse from being eliminated from the competition.

== Production and broadcast ==
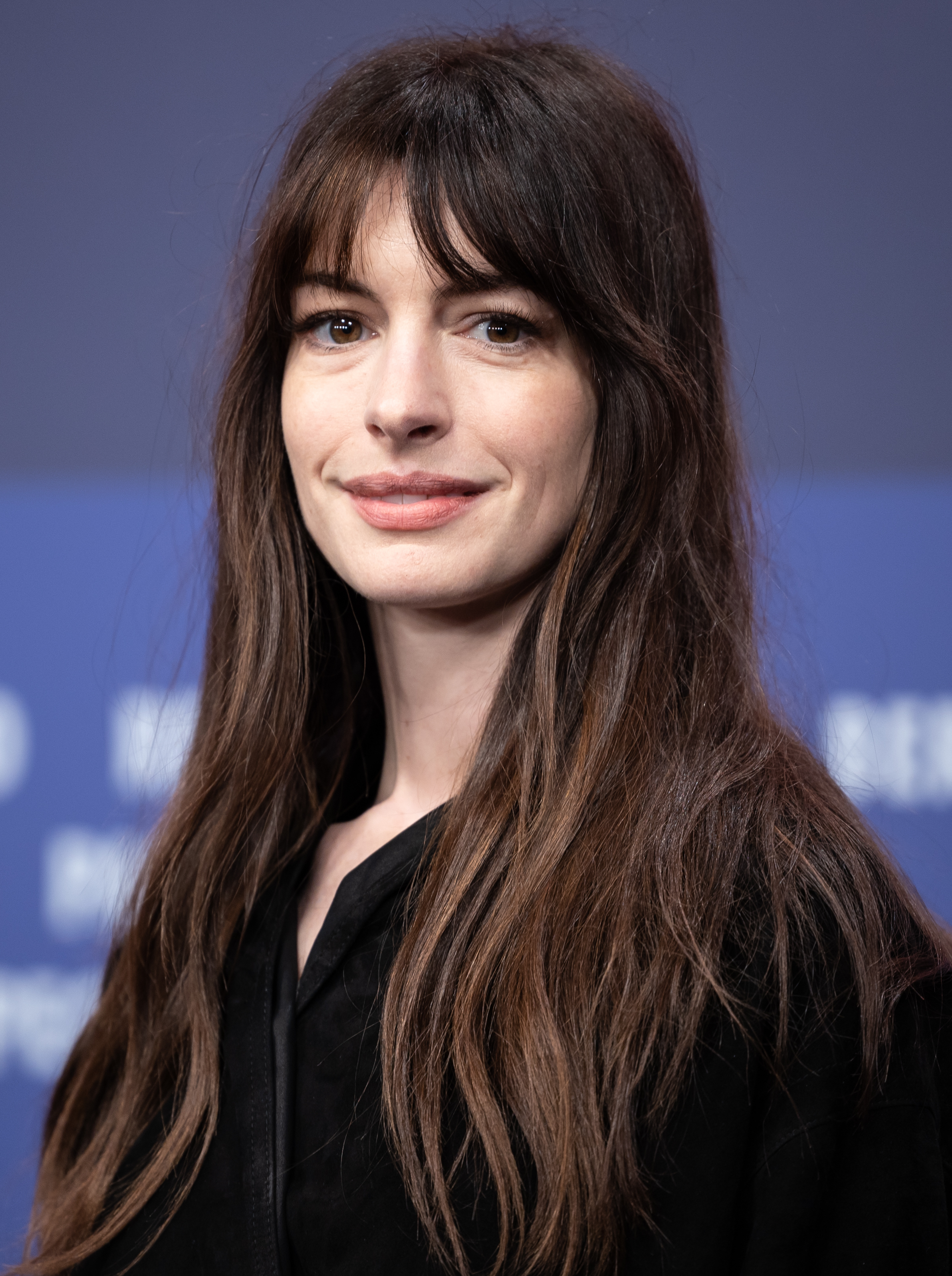
Anne Hathaway (pictured in 2023) makes a guest appearance.

The episode originally aired on February 19, 2021.

Sims has appeared on the show several times. He was a guest judge and choreographer on the eighth season's "Bitch Perfect" (2016), the twelfth season's "Viva Drag Vegas" (2020), and the thirteenth season's "Condragulations" (2021). Additionally, he was solely guest choreographer on the seventh season's "Glamazonian Airways" (2015), the twelfth season's "Madonna: The Unauthorized Rusical" (2020), and the thirteenth season's "Gettin' Lucky" (2021). On the sixth season (2021) of RuPaul's Drag Race All Stars, Sims was a guest judge and choreographer on "Halftime Headliners" and solely a guest choreographer on the finale "This Is Our Country".

The Rusical has many references to other musicals.

=== Fashion ===
For the fashion show, Tina Burner's outfit is taxi-themed. Olivia Lux wears a dress with yellow ostrich feathers, and Symone's outfit has suspenders. Kandy Muse recreates a dress made famous by Beyoncé. Elliott with 2 Ts also wears a taxi-themed outfit, and Rosé's look pays tribute to Jim Carrey in The Mask (1994). Denali wears snakes on her head, and Gottmik's outfit resembles a crash test dummy.

== Reception ==
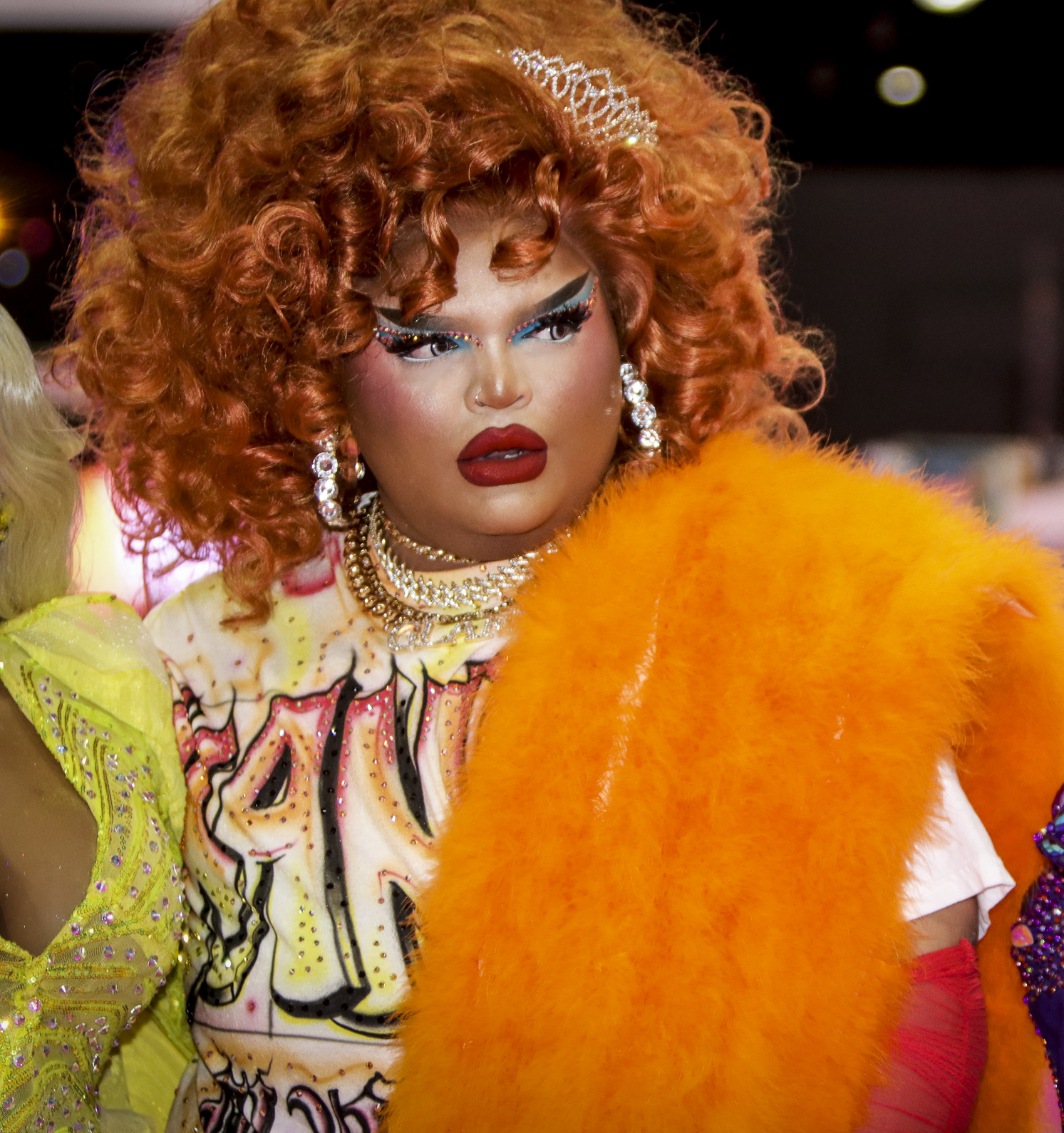
Kandy Muse (pictured at RuPaul's DragCon LA in 2022) loses the lip-sync contest but is spared elimination from the competition.

Kate Kulzick of The A.V. Club called the Rusical "fun, if flimsy". Jared Richards of Junkee called the musical "chaotic, confusing, funny, messy and either ridiculously entertaining or infuriating, depending on your mileage". The website's Bradley Johnston ranked the production eleventh in a 2021 list of Rusicals on the show to date and said, " whichever boomer was commissioned to write Social Media: The Unverified Rusical missed the mark, and the material queens were left with was painfully average, landing it in last place". Johnston wrote, "Rosé’s performance was incredible and a deserved win, Utica really served with arguably the most difficult verse and Denali and Gottmik should receive their own spinoff show where they solve mysteries as lesbian Russian spies. But alas, nothing could save this one as the worst in the show’s herstory."

Amaya Lynch included the episode in Screen Rant's 2022 list of the show's worst, based on IMDb ratings. Lynch wrote, "The Rusicals are a hit-or-miss recurring challenge, but after season 12's excellent Madonna Rusical, the disappointing 'Unverified Rusical' stood out as one of the worst. Some queens such as Rosé were able to shine in the challenge, but when the lip-sync between Kandy Muse and Symone resulted in a double shantay, fans were once again calling, 'Rigga morris!' This was yet another time in the season when Ru appeared to dispense with meritocracy to play favorites for the sake of TV value." Charlie Duncan of PinkNews ranked the musical fourteenth in a 2024 list of show's worst Rusicals to date, writing: "This was weird. A Drag Race Rusical based on *checks notes* LinkedIn and Russian spies, with Tina Burner as EmShee? No, thanks. There was no stand-out moment or song (apart from maybe Utica’s Twitter verse), the theme wasn’t particularly engaging and we don’t have that much to say on the matter. Never a good sign. It was also season 13’s double shantay between Symone and Kandy Muse, which seemed unsatisfactory for some viewers, and snagged Rosé her first (deserved) win."
