= Rosé (drag queen) =

Scottish-American drag performer

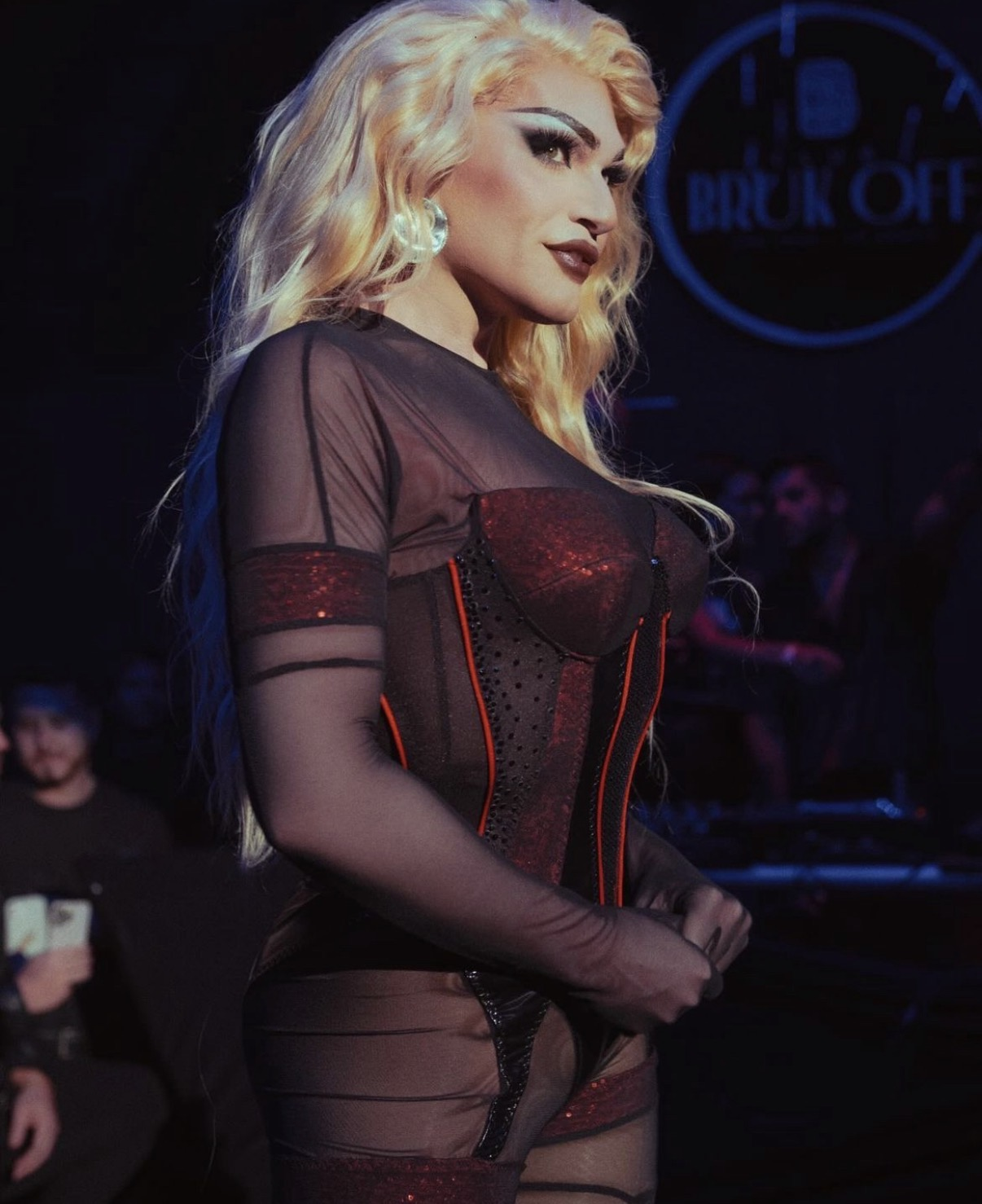
- Rosé in 2023
- Born: Ross Matthew McCorkell; 26 May 1989 (age 37); Greenock, Scotland
- Citizenship: United Kingdom; United States
- Education: Wichita State University (BFA)
- Occupations: Drag queen; singer
- Known for: RuPaul's Drag Race (season 13)
- Website: omgheyrose.com

Ross Matthew McCorkell (born 26 May 1989), better known by the stage name Rosé, is a Scottish-American drag queen and singer based in Manhattan in New York City. He is best known for competing on the thirteenth season of RuPaul's Drag Race, placing as third/fourth runner-up alongside Gottmik.

== Early life ==
McCorkell was born to Heather McCorkell in Greenock, Scotland, in Inverclyde. As a young child, he moved with his parents, brother, and sister to Aberdeen, where he grew up. At the age of 10, the family moved to Sugar Land, Texas, where his parents still live. McCorkell says that to fit in at school he would put on an American accent.

== Career ==
McCorkell, after starting drag in 2017, performed in a queer play as part of the Capital Fringe Festival, in Washington, D.C. He originally considered making “PIG.” his drag name. Then he, together with queens Jan Sport and Lagoona Bloo, formed the pop group Stephanie's Child in 2018. In 2017, Rosé won the Lady Liberty drag competition in New York after 12 weeks of competition against 73 other drag kings and queens. He graduated from Wichita State University.

Rosé's casting on the thirteenth season of RuPaul's Drag Race was announced on 9 December 2020. Rosé performed well in the competition, winning three challenges, including the Rusical, and ultimately reaching the top four alongside Gottmik, Kandy Muse, and Symone. Rosé was one of two contestants to never be up for elimination during the season, along with Gottmik. Rosé was eliminated during the finale episode in a lip sync battle against Kandy Muse, ultimately tying with Gottmik as second/third runner up.

After the airing of the Snatch Game episode, Rosé posted a mini-series to Instagram's IGTV and YouTube titled Mary, Queen of Scots, performing as the Snatch Game character. The mini-series has featured some of Rosé's friends, including Jan and Matthew Camp.

McCorkell released his debut single as a solo artist on 7 May 2021, called "The Devil in the Details".

In December 2022, Rosé was cast in Titanique, a successful off-Broadway musical parody of James Cameron's 1997 blockbuster film.

In July 2023, Rosé was announced to star as Glinda in the Geva Theatre Center's all-LGBTQ+ production of The Wizard of Oz.

== Filmography ==
=== Television ===
| Year | Title | Role | Notes |
|---|---|---|---|
| 2017 | The Voice | Herself (with Stephanie's Child and Jessie J) | Special guest |
| 2019 | America's Got Talent | Herself (with Stephanie's Child) | Contestant |
| 2021 | RuPaul's Drag Race (season 13) | Herself | Contestant (3rd/4th Place) |
| 2021 | RuPaul's Drag Race: Untucked | Herself | Contestant (3rd/4th Place) |
| 2021 | RuPaul's Drag Race: Corona Can't Keep a Good Queen Down | Herself | Standalone special |
| 2022 | iCarly | Kimmy Kimmy Moore | Episode: "iDragged Him" |
| 2022–2023 | Watch What Happens Live with Andy Cohen | Herself | 2 episodes |

=== Web series ===
| Year | Title | Role | Notes | Ref |
|---|---|---|---|---|
| 2021 | Ruvealing the Look | Herself | Guest | |
| 2021 | Whatcha Packin' | Herself | Guest | |
| 2021 | Cosmo Queens | Herself | Guest | |
| 2021 | The X Change Rate | Herself | Guest | |
| 2021 | Out of the Closet | Herself | Guest | |

=== Music videos ===
| Year | Title | Notes | Ref |
|---|---|---|---|
| 2021 | "GIMME WHAT I WANT" (Miley Cyrus Cover) | Directed by Austin Nunes | |
| 2021 | "BOYS" Disco Remix Ft. Denali | Directed by Austin Nunes | |
| 2021 | "The Devil In The Details" | Directed by Austin Nunes | |
| 2022 | "Santa Baby" | Directed by Austin Nunes | |

== Discography ==
All credits adapted from Apple Music and Spotify.

=== Singles ===
==== As lead artist ====
| Title | Year | Album | Writer(s) | Producer(s) |
|---|---|---|---|---|
| “Big Pink Blunt” | 2025 | Non-album-single | Ross McCorkell, Jayelle, Drew Louis | Ross McCorkell, Drew Louis |
| “No Practice” | 2025 | Oh, Boy | Ross McCorkell, Malia Civetz, Aaron Aiken | Ross McCorkell, Aaron Aiken |
| "I Drove All Night" | 2023 | Non-album singles | Billy Steinberg, Tom Kelly | Sixfoot 5, The Rosé |
| "The Night Shift" | 2023 | Non-album singles | The Rosé | Sixfoot 5 |
| "Santa Baby" | 2022 | Non-album singles | Joan Javits, Phillip Springer, Tony Springer | Sixfoot 5 |
| "The Devil in the Details" | 2021 | Non-album singles | The Rosé | Sixfoot 5 |
| "Gimme What I Want" | 2021 | Non-album singles | Ali Tamposi, Andrew Woman, Louis Bell, Majid Al-Maskati, Miley Cyrus | Sixfoot 5, The Rosé |

==== As featured artist ====
| Title | Year |
|---|---|
| "Phenomenon (Cast Version)" (RuPaul featuring The Cast of RuPaul's Drag Race, Season 13 (Note: The queens on this track from the cast include Denali, Joey Jay, Kahmora Hall, Rosé, Tamisha Iman and Utica Queen.)) | 2021 |
| "Social Media: The Unverified Rusical" (The Cast of RuPaul's Drag Race, Season 13 (Note: The queens on this track from the cast include Tina Burner, Olivia Lux, Symone, Utica Queen, Kandy Muse, Eliott with 2Ts, Rosé, Denali and Gottmik.)) | 2021 |
| "Lucky" (RuPaul featuring The Cast of RuPaul's Drag Race, Season 13 (Note: The queens on this track from the cast include Gottmik, Kandy Muse, Rosé and Symone.)) | 2021 |

== Awards and nominations ==
| Year | Award-giving body | Category | Work | Results | Ref. |
|---|---|---|---|---|---|
| 2022 | The Queerties | Future All-Star | Herself | Nominated | |

== See also ==
- LGBT culture in New York City
- List of LGBT people from New York City
