= Jamal Sims =

American choreographer and director

- Born: Pomona, California, U.S.
- Occupations: director; choreographer; executive producer
- Spouse: Octavius Terry (m. 2014; sep. 2019)

Jamal Sims is an American choreographer, executive producer, and director.

== Career ==
Sims created the choreography for Miley Cyrus' 2009 promotional single "Hoedown Throwdown" for Hannah Montana: The Movie. He also served as the director and choreographer for Cyrus' 2009 Wonder World Tour.

Since 2014, Sims has regularly appeared in RuPaul’s Drag Race as a choreographer and guest judge. His directorial debut, When the Beat Drops, premiered on Logo TV in 2018.

In 2022, Sims becomes a choreographer for season 2 of RuPaul's Secret Celebrity Drag Race. It was announced to the public that Sims would be serving as executive producer and choreographer for the Beauty and the Beast television special on ABC, starring Shania Twain and Martin Short.

== Personal life ==
Sims is of African descent and he is gay. His biggest influence is Michael Jackson. He spent most of his childhood in Atlanta, Georgia.

In 2019, Sims and his life partner Octavius Terry-Sims ended their marriage.

== Filmography ==
=== Film ===
Year	Title	Role	Notes
2001	Vanilla Sky	Himself	Choreographer
2004	After the Sunset	Himself	Choreographer
2004	Garfield: The Movie	Himself	Dance choreographer
2005	Beauty Shop	Himself	Choreographer
2006	Step Up	Himself	Choreographer
2007	Hairspray	Himself	Associate choreographer
2007	Walk Hard: The Dewey Cox Story	Himself	Assistant choreographer
2008	Get Smart	Himself	Choreographer
2008	Step Up 2: The Streets	Himself	Choreographer
2008	Soul Men	Himself	Choreographer
2009	17 Again	Himself	Choreographer
2009	Hannah Montana: The Movie	Himself	Choreographer
2009	Year One	Himself	Choreographer
2010	Madonna: Sticky & Sweet Tour	Himself	Choreographer; Concert film
2010	Miley Cyrus: Live at the O2	Himself	Choreographer; Concert film
2010	Step Up 3D	Himself	Supervising choreographer
2011	Big Mommas: Like Father, Like Son	Himself	Choreographer
2011	Footloose	Himself	Choreographer
2011	Jack and Jill	Himself	Choreographer
2012	Step Up Revolution	Himself	Choreographer
2012	VeggieTales: The Princess and the Popstar	Himself	Choreographer
2013	The Best Man Holiday	Himself	Choreographer
2013	Shoshana Bean: Cold Turkey	Himself	Director; Short film
2014	Step Up All In	Himself	Choreographer; associate producer
2018	When the Beat Drops	Himself	Director
2019	Aladdin	Himself	Choreographer; dance double
2019	Descendants 3	Dr. Facilier	Also choreographer
2021	Encanto	Himself	Choreography
2021	He's All That	Himself	Choreography
2022	13: The Musical	Himself	Choreography

=== Television ===
Year	Title	Role	Notes
2005	Six Feet Under	Himself	Choreographer; "The Rainbow of Her Reasons"
2009	Teen Choice Awards 2009	Himself	Choreographer
2010	82nd Annual Academy Awards	Himself	Choreographer
2010	Nickelodeon Kids' Choice Awards 2010	Himself	Choreographer
2010	Teen Choice Awards 2010	Himself	Choreographer
2011	RuPaul's Drag U (season 2)	Himself	Choreographer; "Nominated by Loved Ones" and "Mama Mia, I Need Help!"
2012	S2udio City	Himself	Consulting producer - 10 episodes Director - 5 episodes
2014	RuPaul's Drag Race (season 6)	Himself	Guest Judge/Choreographer; "Sissy That Walk"
2015	RuPaul's Drag Race (season 7)	Himself	Choreographer; "Glamazonian Airways"
2016	RuPaul's Drag Race (season 8)	Himself	Guest Judge/Choreographer; "Bitch Perfect"
2016	So You Think You Can Dance: The Next Generation	Himself	Guest choreographer
2019	RuPaul's Drag Race (season 11)	Himself	Choreographer: "Grand Finale"
2020	RuPaul's Drag Race (season 12)	Himself	Choreographer; "Madonna: The Unauthorized Rusical" and "Grand Finale"; Guest Judge/Choreographer; "Viva Drag Vegas"
2020	RuPaul's Drag Race: Vegas Revue	Himself	Choreographer
2021	Barbie: Big City, Big Dreams	Himself	Choreographer; TV Movie
2021	RuPaul's Drag Race (season 13)	Himself	Guest Judge; "Condragulations" and "Social Media: The Unverified Rusical"; Choreographer; "Gettin' Lucky"
2021	RuPaul's Drag Race All Stars (season 6)	Himself	Guest Judge; "Halftime Headliners"; Choreographer; "This Is Our Country"
2022	Beauty and the Beast: A 30th Celebration	Himself	Choreographer and co-executive producer; TV special
2022	Encanto at the Hollywood Bowl	Himself	Director; TV special
2022	RuPaul's Secret Celebrity Drag Race (season 2)	Himself	Choreographer
2023	Grease: Rise of the Pink Ladies	Himself	Choreographer
2023	Dancing with the Stars (season 32)	Himself	Choreographer; "Motown Night"
2024	RuPaul's Drag Race (season 16)	Himself	Guest Judge/Choreographer; "Werq the World"
2024	RuPaul's Drag Race All Stars (season 9)	Himself	Guest appearance; "Grand Finale Variety Extravaganza: Part 2"
2024	RuPaul's Drag Race Global All Stars	Himself	Main judge
2024	Dancing with the Stars (season 33)	Himself	Choreographer; "Premiere"
2025	RuPaul's Drag Race (season 17)	Himself	Guest Judge/Choreographer; "The Wicked Wiz of Oz: The Rusical!"; Guest Judge; "Grand Finale"
2025	RuPaul's Drag Race All Stars (season 10)	Himself	Choreographer; "Winner Winner, Chicken Dinner"; Guest Judge/Choreographer; "Stagecooch"
2026	RuPaul's Drag Race (season 18)	Himself	Guest appearance; "You Can't Keep a Good Drag Queen Down!"; Guest Judge; "Drag Queens for Change" and "All RuPaul-A-Paruza Smackdown"; Guest Judge/Choreographer; "Fannie: The Hard Knock Ball Rusical" and "Grand Finale"
2026	RuPaul's Drag Race All Stars (season 11)	Himself	Guest Judge; "Duets: It Takes Two", "Rappin' Roast Redux", "Disco Smackdown for the Crown"
2026	Dancing with the Stars (season 35)	Himself	Choreographer; "Premiere" and "Super Bowl Night"

== Awards and nominations ==
=== Emmy Awards ===
Year	Category	Work	Result	Ref.
2023	Outstanding Choreography for Scripted Programming	Grease: Rise of the Pink Ladies	Nominated	
2023	Outstanding Choreography for Variety or Reality Programming	Encanto at the Hollywood Bowl	Nominated	
2023	Outstanding Choreography for Variety or Reality Programming	Beauty and the Beast: A 30th Celebration	Nominated	
2024	Outstanding Choreography for Variety or Reality Programming	RuPaul's Drag Race	Nominated	
2025	Outstanding Choreography for Variety or Reality Programming	The Lion King at the Hollywood Bowl	Nominated	
2026	Outstanding Choreography for Variety or Reality Programming	RuPaul's Drag Race	Nominated	

=== GLAAD Media Awards ===
Year	Category	Work	Result	Ref.
2018	Outstanding Documentary	When the Beat Drops	Nominated	
