= Gottmik =

American drag performer and make-up artist (born 1996)

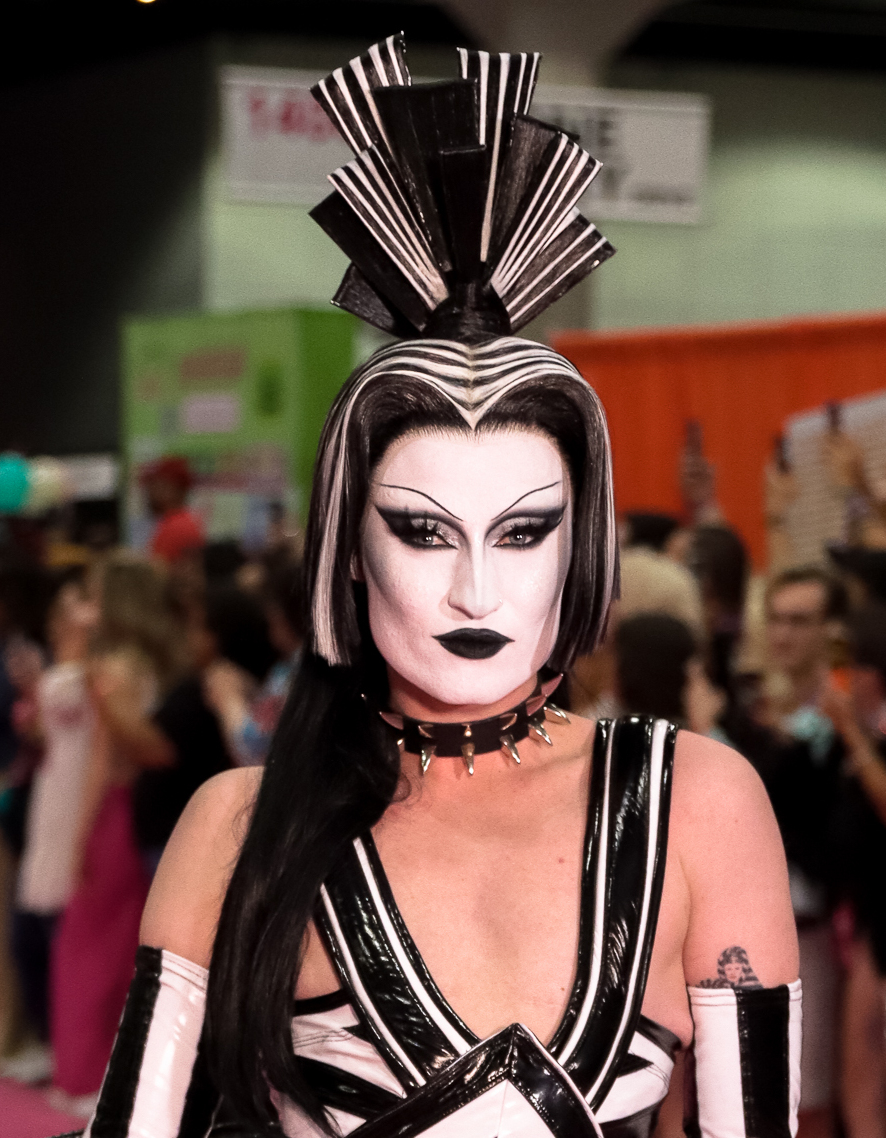
- Gottmik at RuPaul's DragCon LA, 2023
- Born: August 19, 1996 (age 30); Scottsdale, Arizona, U.S.
- Other name: Kade Gottlieb
- Education: Fashion Institute of Design & Merchandising
- Occupations: Drag performer; make-up artist
- Television: RuPaul's Drag Race (season 13); RuPaul's Drag Race All Stars (season 9)
- Website: gottmik.com

Kade Gottlieb (born August 19, 1996), better known as Gottmik, is an American drag performer and make-up artist. Gottmik was the first trans man to compete on RuPaul's Drag Race, coming in shared 3rd/4th place on the thirteenth season with fellow contestant Rosé. Gottmik later returned to compete in the ninth season of RuPaul's Drag Race All Stars. Gottmik co-hosts the podcast No Gorge alongside Violet Chachki.

== Early life ==
Kade Gottlieb was born in Scottsdale, Arizona and had been adopted. He was raised Catholic and attended the Catholic Notre Dame Preparatory High School, where he first started wearing makeup. He began experimenting with drag at the age of eighteen. After high school, he pursued a career in the fashion industry by relocating to Los Angeles, where he transitioned and developed his cosmetics and drag skills. He earned a degree in product development from the Fashion Institute of Design & Merchandising.

== Career ==
=== Make-up artistry ===
As a make-up artist, Gottmik has done makeup for Cindy Crawford, Todrick Hall, Paris Hilton, Heidi Klum, Adam Lambert, French Montana, and Tinashe, as well as Drag Race contestants Alaska Thunderfuck, Detox Icunt, Gia Gunn, Shangela, Violet Chachki, and Willam Belli. His work, described by Out's Rose Dommu as "[ranging] from highly conceptual to urbane", has appeared in the magazines Flaunt, Nylon, and Paper. He did makeup for Amanda Lepore and Pabllo Vittar for their covers on Gay Times. In 2020, Gottmik did Lil Nas X's makeup for Halloween, when he dressed as Nicki Minaj. He also did the makeup for the celebrities who were featured in the music video for Taylor Swift's 2019 song "You Need to Calm Down".

=== RuPaul's Drag Race and subsequent tours ===
In 2021, Gottmik became the first trans man to compete on RuPaul's Drag Race, appearing on the thirteenth season. Gottmik performed well in the competition, winning two challenges (the ball and the Snatch Game, performing as Paris Hilton), and ultimately reaching the top four alongside Kandy Muse, Symone, and Rosé. Gottmik was eliminated during the finale episode in a lip sync for your life to the song "Gimme More" against the season's eventual winner, Symone, ultimately tying with Rosé as second/third runner up.

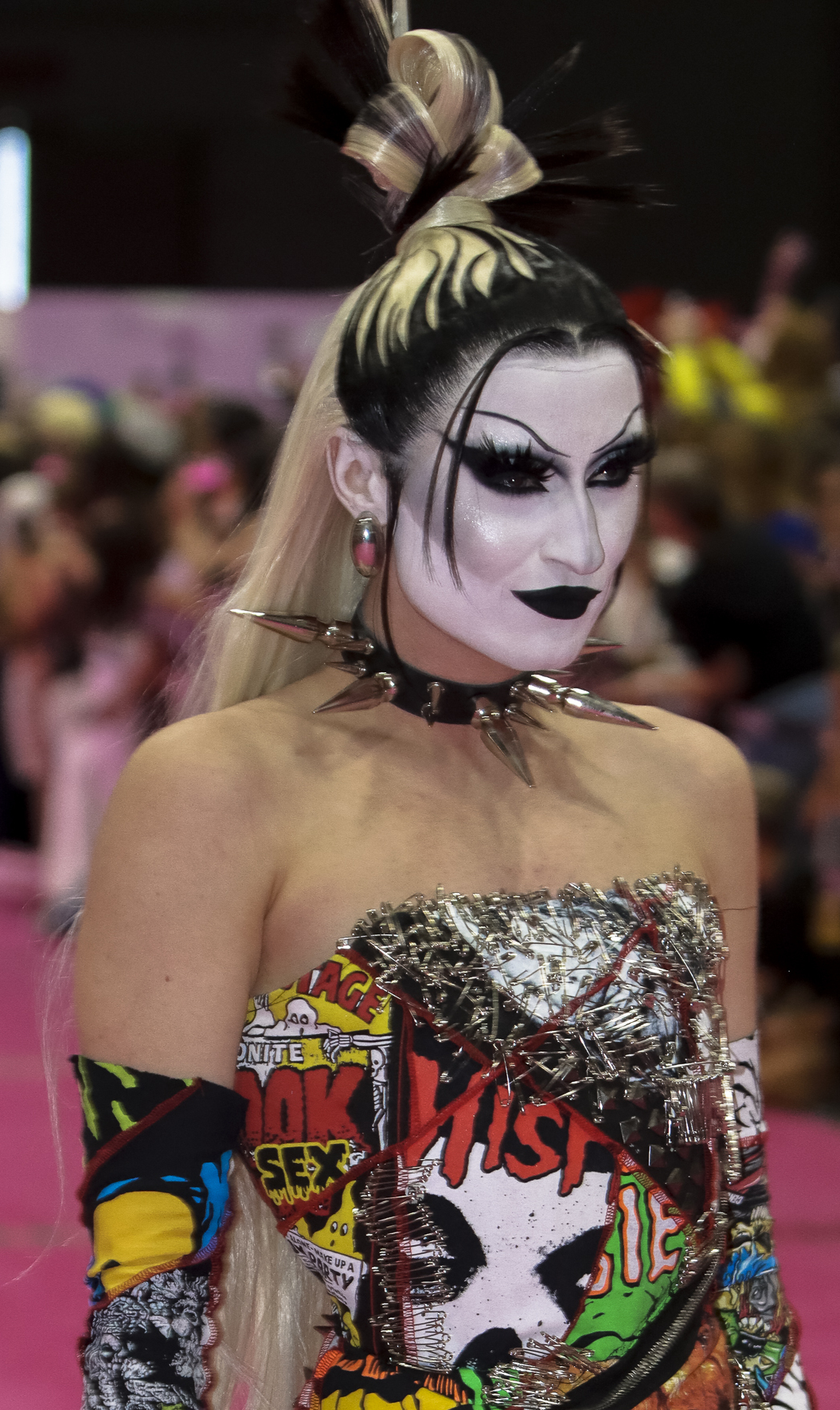
Gottmik at RuPaul's DragCon LA in 2022

After competing on Drag Race, Gottmik signed with Voss Events talent management, and traveled the United States with Voss' COVID-19 pandemic-compliant drive-in drag show, Drive 'N Drag Saves 2021. Gottmik also joined Voss' 2022 European tour, RuPaul's Drag Race Werq the World tour. In October 2021, Gottmik performed alongside fellow drag race alumni Violet Chachki, Alyssa Edwards, Aquaria, Jaida Essence Hall, Kandy Muse, Plastique Tiara, Rosé, and Kim Chi on Voss Event's Night of the Living Drag Halloween tour. On April 23, 2024, Gottmik was announced as one of the eight contestants competing on the ninth season of RuPaul's Drag Race All Stars. During the season’s comedy roast, Gottmik used multiple sets from comedian Nikki Glaser’s standup without attribution, resulting in criticism from some social media users. Gottmik responded they had “reworked” the material.

=== Media ===
Gottmik launched a YouTube channel in January 2021. Gottlieb has also appeared on the Gigi Gorgeous, Pearl, James Charles and World of Wonder channels. Gottmik was featured on the cover of Attitude for its April Style issue in 2021. Cosmopolitan invited Gottmik to demonstrate how he transforms into Gottmik. In a July 2021 interview with Entertainment Weekly, it was revealed that the producers of the 2022 remake of Hellraiser auditioned Gottmik for the role of the film's most iconic character, Pinhead. Gottmik had previously worn a black-and-white-themed runway look inspired by Pinhead in the season 13 finale of RuPaul's Drag Race.

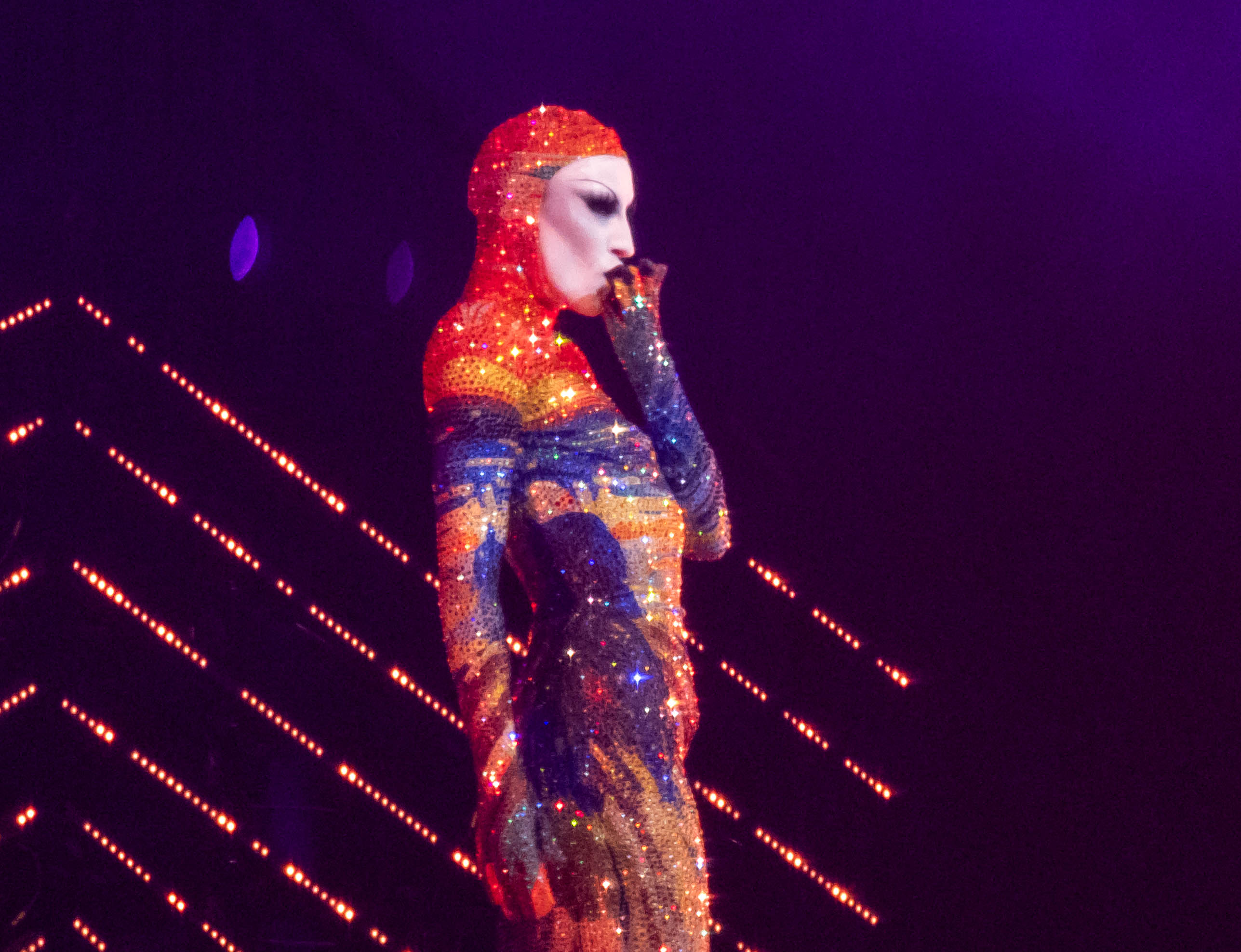
Gottmik performing on the RuPaul's Drag Race All Stars tour, 2024

In September 2021, Gottmik started the YouTube and podcast series No Gorge with fellow drag race alum Violet Chachki, where they discuss "all things fashion, life, and artistry". In September 2022, Gottmik appeared in the music video for Sam Smith and Kim Petras' song "Unholy" alongside Violet Chachki. Gottmik and Violet Chachki also performed alongside Smith and Petras to "Unholy" at the 2023 Grammy Awards.

Gottmik released his debut book The T Guide on May 16, 2023, through Penguin Random House. Well received by fans, and co-written with Canadian beauty influencer Gigi Gorgeous, The T Guide discusses the duo's "trans experiences and a celebration of gender expression – man, woman, nonbinary, and beyond".

== Personal life ==
Out described Gottmik as "someone transmasculine who does high femme drag". Gottlieb uses she/her pronouns when portraying Gottmik, and he/him pronouns out of drag. Gottmik is pansexual.

Gigi Gorgeous is one of Gottmik’s closest friends; the two have appeared on magazine covers and launched merchandise together. Gigi also helped to fund Gottmik’s chest reconstruction surgery.

On Sept 16 2026, Gottmik was arrested by Burbank Police and charged with driving under the influence of alcohol. Allegedly, Gottmik drove a black Porsche into several parked cars at 4:50 pm. He was later released on Sept 17.

== Awards and nominations ==
Year	Nominee / work	Award	Result
2021	RuPaul's Drag Race	People's Choice Award for The Competition Contestant of 2021	Nominated
2022	Himself	The Queerty Groundbreaker Award	Won
2024	Himself	Queerty Award for Future All-Star	Pending

== Discography ==
Title	Year	Notes
"Condragulations (Cast Version)"	2021	RuPaul featuring the Cast of RuPaul's Drag Race, Season 13
"Lucky"	2021	RuPaul featuring the Top 4 of RuPaul's Drag Race, Season 13

== Filmography ==
=== Film ===
Year	Title	Role	Notes	Ref
2018	Dido's Lament		Short	

=== Television ===
Year	Title	Role	Notes	Ref
2021	RuPaul's Drag Race	Contestant	Season 13 (3rd Place)	
2021	RuPaul's Drag Race: Untucked	Contestant	Season 13	
2021	RuPaul's Drag Race: Corona Can't Keep a Good Queen Down	Himself	Stand-alone special	
2021	Savage X Fenty Show Vol. 3	Himself	Amazon Prime Exclusive	
2021	The Bitch Who Stole Christmas	Tristian		
2022	Watch What Happens Live with Andy Cohen	Himself	Guest	
2022	RuPaul's Secret Celebrity Drag Race	Himself	Guest	
2022	The Book of Queer	Himself	Episode: "Kings & Queens"	
2024	RuPaul's Drag Race All Stars (season 9)	Contestant	(4th Place)	
2024	RuPaul's Drag Race All Stars: Untucked	Contestant	(4th Place)	
2025	King of Drag	Himself	Judge	

=== Music videos ===
Year	Title	Artist	Ref.
2021	"Girl Baby"	Ezra Michel	
2022	"Unholy"	Sam Smith & Kim Petras	
2024	"Skullfucker"	Gottmik	

=== Web series ===
Year	Title	Role	Notes	Ref
2018	Puff Puff Sessions	Guest	Produced by World of Wonder	
2019	Transformations	Guest	Produced by World of Wonder	
2021	The X Change Rate	Guest	Produced by BUILD Series	
2021	Whatcha Packin'	Guest	Produced by VH1	
2021	Ruvealing the Look	Guest	Produced by VH1	
2021	Cooking with Paris	Paris Hilton	Produced by Netflix	
2021	Cosmo Queens	Guest	Produced by Cosmopolitan	
2021	Glamour Unfiltered	Guest	Produced by Glamour UK	
2021	The Must List	Guest	Produced by Entertainment Weekly	
2022	The Pit Stop	Guest	Produced by VH1	
2022	Fashion Photo RuView	Host	Produced by World of Wonder	

== See also ==
- Got Milk?
- Timeline of LGBT history, 21st century
- Timeline of transgender history
