= Sasha Belle =

American drag performer

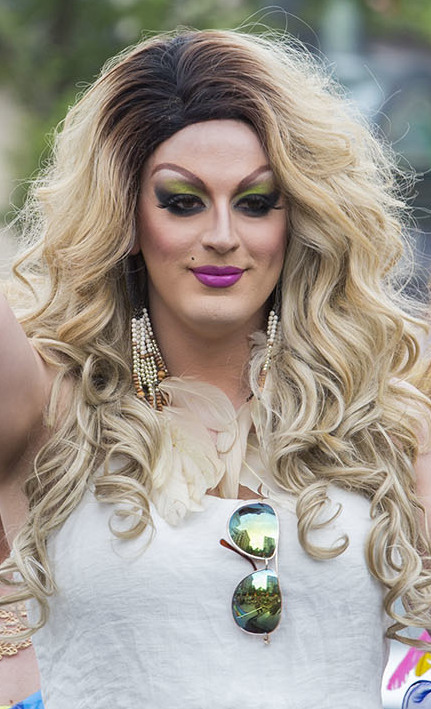
- Sasha Belle in 2014
- Born: Jared Breakenridge; Iowa City, Iowa, U.S.
- Other names: Frisbee Jenkins
- Occupation: Drag queen
- Television: RuPaul's Drag Race (season 7)

Sasha Belle, also known as Frisbee Jenkins, is the stage name of Jared Breakenridge, a drag performer who competed on season 7 of RuPaul's Drag Race.

== Career ==
Sasha Belle competed on season 7 of RuPaul's Drag Race. She was the second contestant eliminated. Her drag name is composed of Sasha, in homage to Beyoncé's alter ego Sasha Fierce, and Belle, taken from her drag mother Pretty Belle. The first name of her current drag moniker, Frisbee Jenkins, is inspired by the Reno 911 character Frisbee McDaniels. She has hosted her drag show at Studio 13, called Sasha Belle's Drag Race. She later become known as Frisbee Jenkins, and has shared adult content on OnlyFans.

== Personal life ==
Sasha Belle is from Iowa City, Iowa.

== Filmography ==
=== Television ===
- RuPaul's Drag Race (season 7)

== See also ==
- List of people from Iowa
