= Kandy Muse =

American drag performer

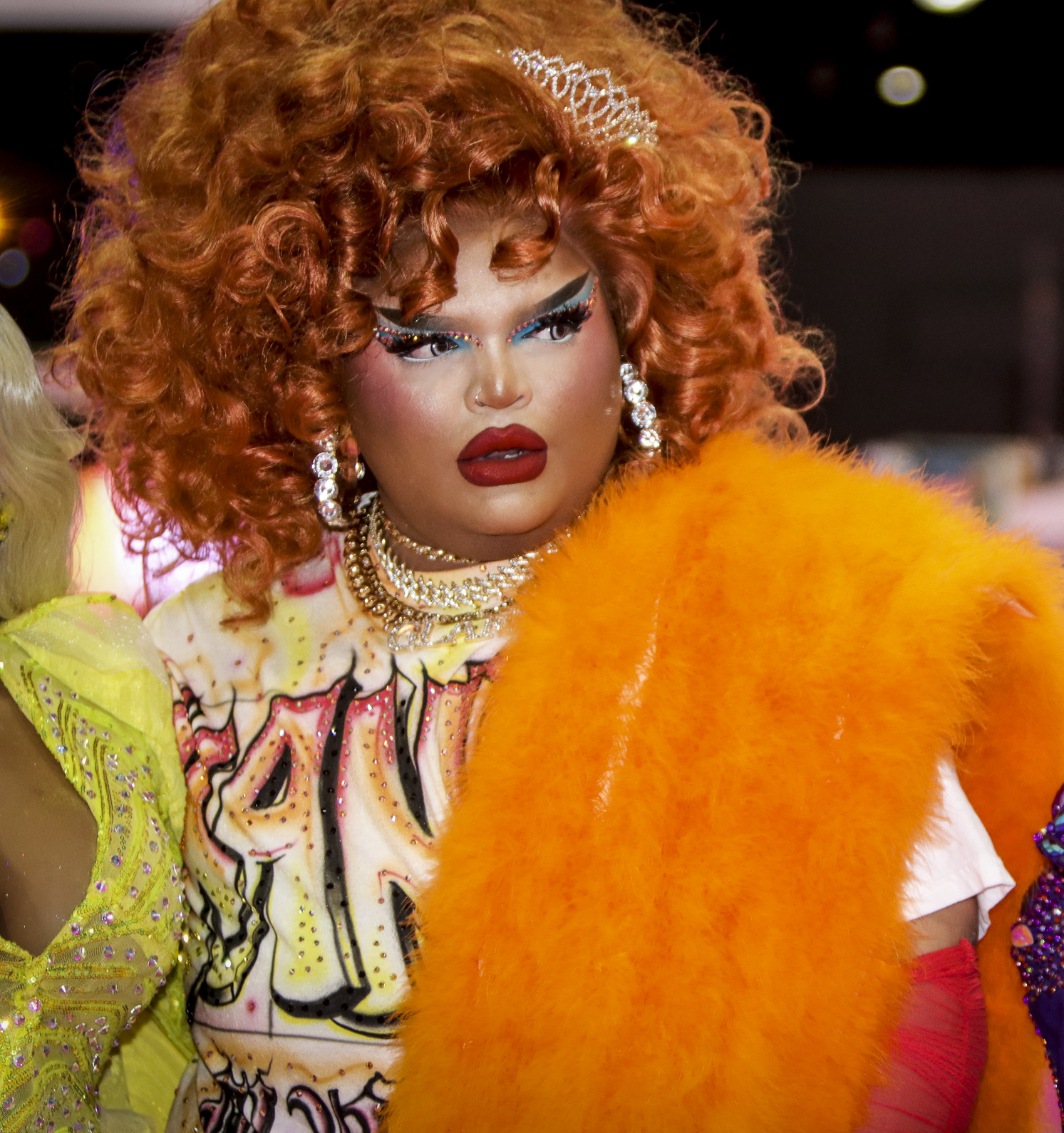
- Kandy Muse at RuPaul's DragCon LA, 2022
- Born: Kevin Gabriel Candelario; November 3, 1994 (age 32); South Bronx, New York City, U.S.
- Other name: Cherry Blossom
- Television: RuPaul's Drag Race (season 13) • RuPaul's Drag Race All Stars (season 8)
- Website: thekandymuse.com

Kandy Muse is the stage name of Kevin Gabriel Candelario (born November 3, 1994), an American drag queen and performer most known for being the runner-up on both the thirteenth season of RuPaul's Drag Race (2021) and the eighth season of RuPaul's Drag Race All Stars (2023). In 2024, she starred on the second season of reality television series House of Villains and Slaycation.

== Career ==
Kandy Muse was a former member of the House of Aja, a queer collective house ran by Aja, a drag queen who competed on the ninth season of RuPaul's Drag Race.

Kandy Muse was a member of the Doll Haus, alongside fellow former House of Aja members Dahlia Sin and her daughter Janelle No. 5. Now she is the mother of the House of Muse, including Xunami Muse, Papito Suave, and Lucas Skywalker.

In 2021, Kandy Muse competed on the thirteenth season of Drag Race, during which Kandy Muse portrayed a "slutty version" of LinkedIn in "Social Media: The Unverified Rusical" and Patrick Starrr in the Snatch Game episode, and placed runner up to winner Symone.

In 2023, Muse competed on the eighth season of RuPaul's Drag Race All Stars, where she was declared the runner-up to Jimbo. After the airing of the season, Kandy's own World of Wonder original series, Inside the Producer's Studio with Kandy Muse, was announced to premiere on August 7, 2023.

Kandy Muse is the drag mother of Xunami Muse, who competed on the sixteenth season of Drag Race in 2024.

=== Music ===
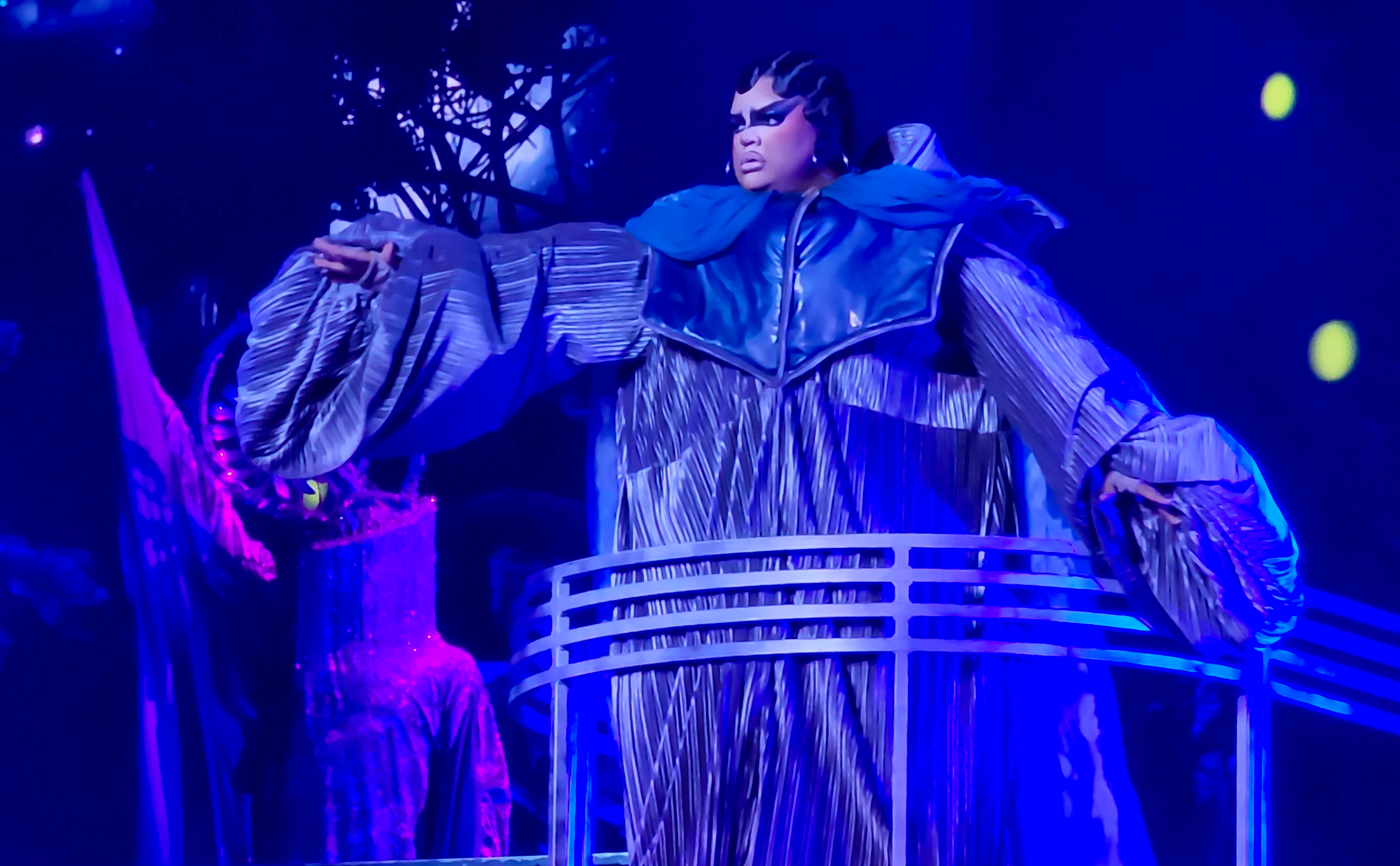
Kandy Muse performing during Werq the World (2023)

In 2017, Kandy Muse was featured on Eureka O'Hara's song "Body Positivity" and appeared in the music video for Velo's "Big Dick Daddy". Serving as the song's inspiration, Kandy Muse appeared on Alaska Thunderfuck's "Sitting Alone in the VIP" as well as the accompanying music video in 2020.

== Personal life ==
Candelario was born to parents of Dominican descent and lives in New York, as of 2021. He is also African American and identifies as Black. He was born in the South Bronx, NYC, and was raised between Tremont, Bronx and the Dominican Republic. He grew up Mormon and was baptized at 8 years old.

== Discography ==
=== Singles ===
==== As featured artist ====
| Title | Year | Album |
|---|---|---|
| "ConDragulations" (with the cast of RuPaul's Drag Race, season 13) | 2021 | Non-album single |
| "Social Media: The Unverified Rusical" (with the cast of RuPaul's Drag Race, season 13) | 2021 | Social Media: The Unverified Rusical Album |
| "Lucky" (with the cast of RuPaul's Drag Race, season 13) | 2021 | Non-album single |
| "Money, Success, Fame, Glamour" (Glam Rock version) (with the cast of RuPaul's Drag Race All Stars, season 8) | 2023 | Non-album single |
| "Joan! The Unauthorized Rusical" (with the cast of RuPaul's Drag Race All Stars, season 8) | 2023 | Joan! The Unauthorized Rusical Album |

=== Other appearances ===
| Song | Year | Artist | Album |
|---|---|---|---|
| "Body Positivity" | 2017 | Eureka O'Hara, Adam Barta & Electropoint | Non-album single |
| "Sitting Alone in the VIP" | 2020 | Alaska Thunderfuck | Non-album single |

== Filmography ==
=== Television ===
| Year | Title | Role | Notes | Ref |
|---|---|---|---|---|
| 2017 | RuPaul's Drag Race All Stars (season 3) | Guest | Stand-alone special episode: "Exclusive Queen Ruveal" | |
| 2021 | RuPaul's Drag Race (season 13) | Contestant | Runner-up (16 episodes) | |
| 2021 | RuPaul's Drag Race: Untucked | Herself | Season 13 (14 episodes) | |
| 2021 | RuPaul's Drag Race: Corona Can't Keep a Good Queen Down | Herself | Stand-alone special | |
| 2021 | Dragging the Classics: The Brady Bunch | Cindy Brady | | |
| 2022 | iCarly | Cruella Intentions | Episode: "iDragged Him" | |
| 2023 | RuPaul's Drag Race All Stars (season 8) | Contestant | Runner-up (12 episodes) | |
| 2023 | RuPaul's Drag Race All Stars: Untucked | Herself | | |
| 2023 | Good Morning America | Herself | Guest (1 episode) | |
| 2023 | GMA3: What You Need to Know | Herself | Guest (1 episode) | |
| 2023 | Watch What Happens Live with Andy Cohen | Herself | Guest (1 episode) | |
| 2024 | House of Villains | Contestant | Season 2 (6th Place) | |
| 2025 | RuPaul's Drag Race (season 17) | Herself | Special guest; Episode: "The Villains Roast" | |
| 2024 | Slaycation | Herself | Main cast | |

=== Web series ===
| Year | Title | Role | Notes | Ref |
|---|---|---|---|---|
| 2017 | Cosmo Queens | Herself | Guest | |
| 2018 | Hey Qween! | Herself | Guest (Episode: Aja) | |
| 2021 | Ruvealing the Look | Herself | Guest | |
| 2021 | Whatcha Packin' | Herself | Guest | |
| 2021 | The X Change Rate | Herself | Guest | |
| 2022 | Out of the Closet | Herself | Guest | |
| 2022 | Trixie Cosmetics: Kiki with Kandy Muse | Herself | Guest | |
| 2023 | Meet the Queens | Herself | Stand-alone special RuPaul's Drag Race All Stars 8 | |
| 2023 | EW News Flash | Herself | Guest | |
| 2023 | BuzzFeed Celeb | Herself | Guest | |
| 2023 | Inside the Producer's Studio with Kandy Muse | Host | 7 episodes | |

=== Music videos ===
| Title | Year | Notes |
|---|---|---|
| "Do What U Want" | 2013 | By Lady Gaga featuring R. Kelly |
| "Big Dick Daddy" | 2017 | By Velo |
| "Sitting Alone in the VIP" | 2020 | By Alaska Thunderfuck |

== Awards and nominations ==
| Year | Award-giving body | Category | Work | Results | Ref. |
|---|---|---|---|---|---|
| 2018 | Brooklyn Nightlife Awards | Drag Queen of the Year | Herself | Won | |
| 2021 | MTV Movie & TV Awards | Best Fight (with Tamisha Iman) | RuPaul's Drag Race: Untucked | Nominated | |
| 2022 | Queerty Awards | Future All-Star | Herself | Nominated | |

== See also ==
- Drag culture in New York City
- LGBTQ culture in New York City
- List of LGBTQ people in New York City
