= Symone (drag queen) =

American drag performer

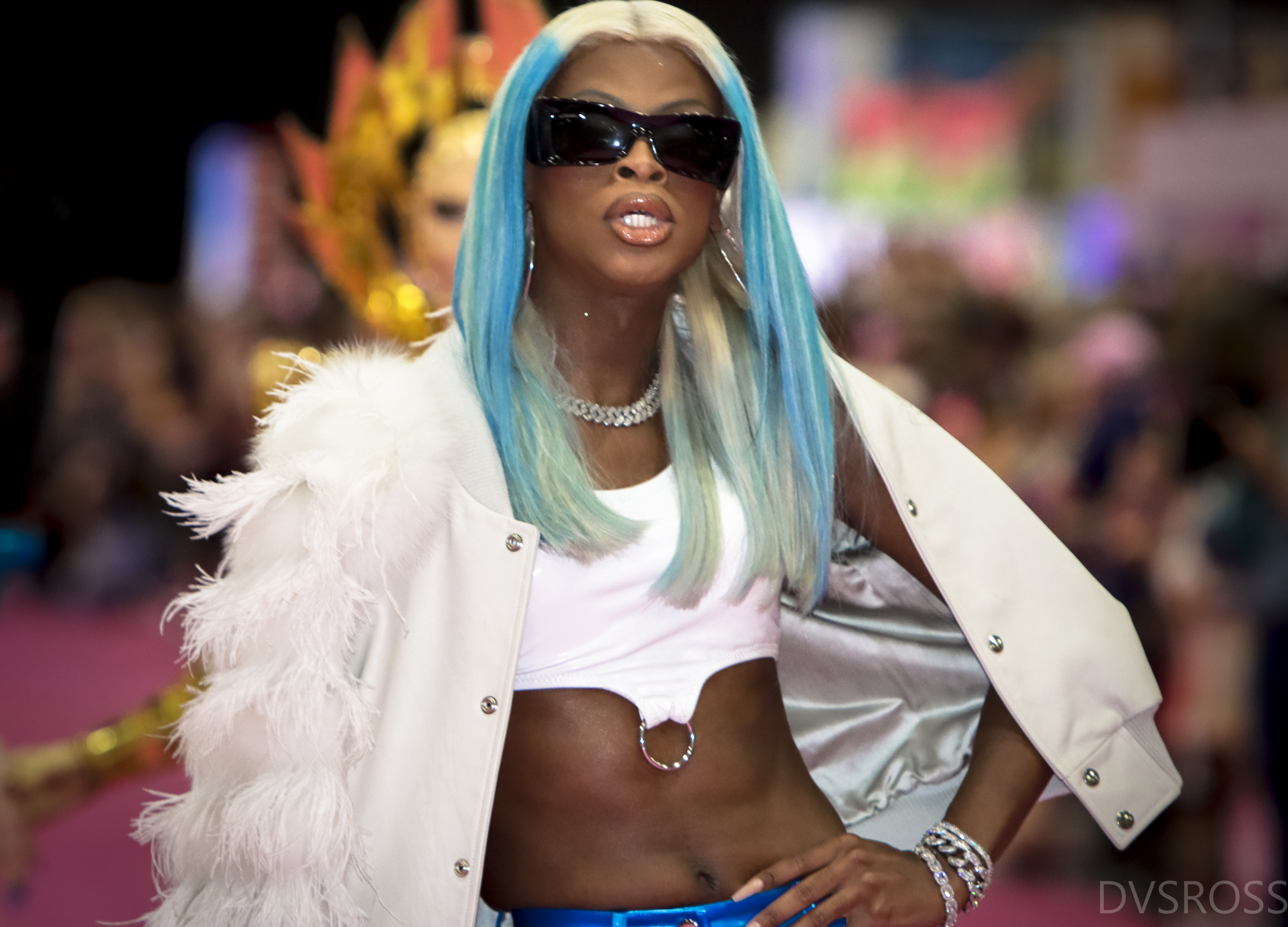
- Symone at RuPaul's DragCon LA, 2022
- Born: Reginald Gavin; January 14, 1995 (age 31); Conway, Arkansas, U.S.
- Other names: Delilah Alamaine; Erykah; Symone Alamaine; Symone Seymour-Cox
- Education: University of Arkansas, Little Rock (BA)
- Occupation: Drag queen
- Years active: 2013–present
- Television: RuPaul's Drag Race (season 13)
- Website: thesymone.com

Reginald Gavin (born January 14, 1995), known by the stage name Symone, is an American drag queen and model. She is best known as the winner of season 13 of RuPaul's Drag Race (2021). She is a member of the queer art collective House of Avalon.

== Early life ==
Born Reggie Gavin, Symone was raised in Conway, Arkansas, as the youngest of three children, with two siblings who are significantly older. A shy child due to anxiety about being gay, Symone discovered drag as a teenager in 2009 after RuPaul's Drag Race debuted, and began to experiment with makeup and drag, attending senior prom in a dress.

== Career ==
=== 2013–2020: Drag beginnings ===
Shortly after high school graduation in 2013, she performed drag for the first time at Triniti Nightclub under the name Delilah Alamaine. While a student at University of Arkansas at Little Rock, she began to build a following as a performer at Discovery and The Factory, and later changed her stage name to Symone, after a character in a play she wrote in high school. She hosted a series called Symone Says. Of her drag identity, she said Symone represents "the person that I really am. I would say Reggie is a mask I put on every day."

Symone is a member of the queer fashion and pop culture collective House of Avalon along with season 12 Drag Race finalist Gigi Goode. The collective was started in 2016 in Little Rock by designer Marko Monroe, Hunter Crenshaw, and Grant Vanderbilt. Vanderbilt is Symone's drag mother.

Symone moved to Los Angeles in 2019 and joined other relocated members of House of Avalon.

=== 2021–present: RuPaul's Drag Race success ===
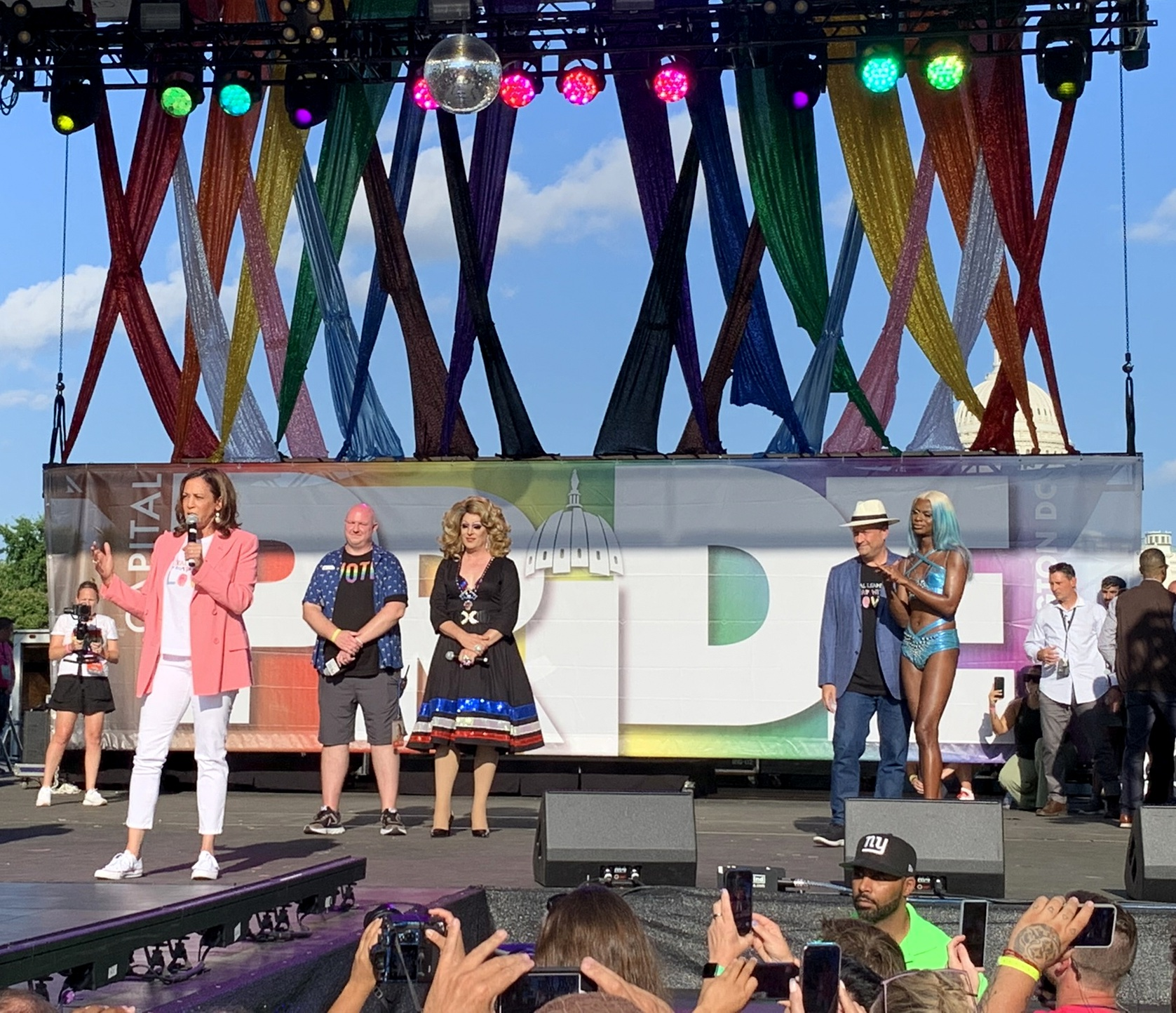
Symone with Vice President Kamala Harris at the 2022 Capital Pride festival

In 2021, Symone gained wider prominence as a contestant on season 13 of RuPaul's Drag Race, where she became the show's first Arkansas contestant. She has received positive reception from critics for her drag fashion and persona, which frequently nod to Black cultural icons like Lil' Kim and Grace Jones. After the first two episodes aired, pop culture websites Vulture and Jezebel stated that Symone was a frontrunner to win season 13. Rihanna sent Symone an Instagram DM after seeing her on the show: "You soooo EVERYTHING! Nasty Lil bitch! I live for every second of it! You're a true joy to watch!"

Symone received media attention for her runway dress worn on episode 9: a white faux leather dress with exaggerated hips, red crystal bullet holes on the back, and a white headpiece emblazoned with Say Their Names. As she walked the runway she recited the names of several murdered Black Americans: Breonna Taylor, George Floyd, Brayla Stone, Trayvon Martin, Tony McDade, Nina Pop, and Monika Diamond. The dress was designed by Marko Monroe and created by Howie B. Symone said her intention with the dress was to state: "No matter how pretty or beautiful or non-threatening I—and Black people—seem, we're still seen as a threat." Symone ultimately won the season in the grand finale that aired on April 23, 2021.

In August 2021, Symone was a featured performer in Drag Fest, a live music festival. Symone was featured on the cover of the September 2021 issue of Interview. That same month, Symone attended the 2021 MTV Video Music Awards, the 2021 Met Gala, and walked the red carpet at the 73rd Primetime Emmy Awards.

== Awards and nominations ==
| Year | Nominee / work | Award | Result |
|---|---|---|---|
| 2021 | RuPaul's Drag Race | People's Choice Award for The Competition Contestant of 2021 | Nominated |
| 2022 | Herself | Queerty Award for Drag Royalty | Runner-up |

== Filmography ==
=== Film ===
| Year | Title | Role | Notes | Ref |
|---|---|---|---|---|
| 2021 | Star-Crossed: The Film | Heist Girl 2 | | |
| 2022 | Bros | Marty | Feature film | |
| 2026 | Stop! That! Train! | Ayshleiygh | | |

=== Television ===
| Year | Title | Role | Notes | Ref |
|---|---|---|---|---|
| 2021 | RuPaul's Drag Race (season 13) | Contestant | Winner | |
| 2021 | RuPaul's Drag Race: Untucked | Contestant | Winner | |
| 2021 | RuPaul's Drag Race: Corona Can't Keep a Good Queen Down | Herself | Stand-alone special | |
| 2021 | 2021 MTV Movie & TV Awards | Herself | Guest | |
| 2021 | Jimmy Kimmel Live! | Herself | Guest | |
| 2021 | Savage X Fenty Show Vol. 3 | Herself | Amazon Prime Exclusive | |
| 2022 | Gutsy | Herself | Episode 1: Gutsy Women Have the Last Laugh | |
| 2023 | Drag Me to Dinner | Herself | Hulu original | |
| 2023 | Celebrity Family Feud | Herself | Guest | |
| 2023 | Avalon TV | Herself | World of Wonder original | |
| 2024 | Ridiculousness | Herself | Guest | |
| 2025 | 2025 MTV Video Music Awards | Herself | Performer with Sabrina Carpenter, Willam, Laganja Estranja, Denali, and Lexi Love | |
| 2026 | Big Mistakes | Drag Queen | 1 episode | |

=== Music videos ===
==== Featured and cameo roles ====
| Year | Title | Artist | Role | Ref(s) |
|---|---|---|---|---|
| 2021 | "Simple Times" | Kacey Musgraves | Featured | |

=== Web series ===
| Year | Title | Role | Notes | Ref |
|---|---|---|---|---|
| 2021 | The X Change Rate | Herself | Guest | |
| 2021 | Ruvealing the Look | Herself | Guest | |
| 2021 | Whatcha Packin' | Herself | Guest | |
| 2021 | Beauty Secrets | Herself | Guest | |
| 2021 | Binge | Herself | Guest | |
| 2021 | The Awardist | Herself | Guest | |
| 2021-23 | The Pit Stop | Herself | Guest | |
| 2023 | Billboard Cover | Herself | Guest | |

== Discography ==
=== As part of the cast of RuPaul's Drag Race, Season 13 ===
==== As lead artist ====
| Title | Year |
|---|---|
| "Condragulations" (cast version) | 2021 |
| "Social Media: The Unverified Rusical" | 2021 |

==== As featured artist ====
| Title | Year |
|---|---|
| "Lucky" (RuPaul featuring the Cast of RuPaul's Drag Race, Season 13) | 2021 |

Awards and achievements
| Preceded by Jaida Essence Hall | Winner of RuPaul's Drag Race; US season 13 | Succeeded by Willow Pill |
