= Grand Finale (RuPaul's Drag Race season 7) =

Episode of RuPaul's Drag Race

- RuPaul's Drag Race episode
- Episode no.: Season 7 Episode 14
- Presented by: RuPaul
- Original air date: June 1, 2015
- Running time: 61 minutes

Episode chronology
← Previous "Countdown to the Crown"	Next → "Keeping It 100!"
- RuPaul's Drag Race season 7

"Grand Finale" is the fourteenth episode and finale of the seventh season of the American television series RuPaul's Drag Race. It originally aired on June 1, 2015. The episode has the season's contestants reunite and the three finalists perform before a winner is crowned. Katya is named Miss Congeniality and Violet Chachki is the winner of the competition.

Former contestants Darienne Lake, Latrice Royale, and Delta Work ask questions from the audience and Patti LaBelle appears in a video message to contestant Jasmine Masters. BenDeLaCreme and Bianca Del Rio, last season's Miss Congeniality and winner, respectively, also make guest appearances.

== Episode ==
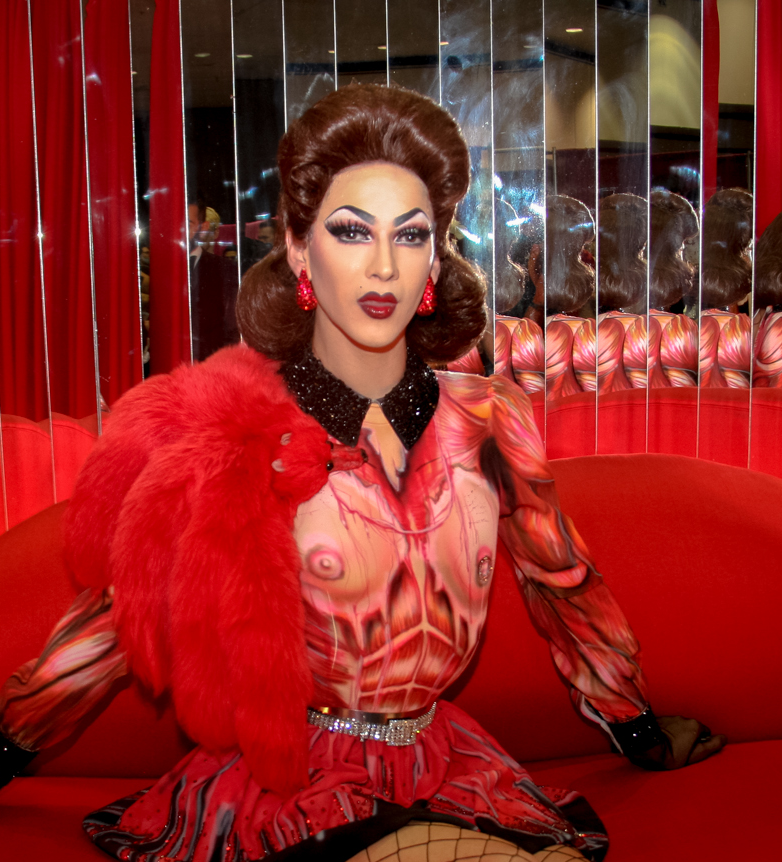
Violet Chachki (pictured at RuPaul's DragCon LA in 2017) is crowned the season's winner.

From the Orpheum Theatre in Los Angeles, all of the season's contestants return for the live grand finale and present their looks on the stage. RuPaul enters and welcomes the audience, then the contestants return. RuPaul also acknowledges judges Michelle Visage, Carson Kressley, and Ross Mathews in the audience, then explain how a winner will be crowned.

The finalists all lip-sync to a song specifically written for them. Ginger Minj, Pearl, and Violet Chachki perform to "Pray and Slay", "Sleep Walker", and "Too Many Daddies", respectively. RuPaul interviews each finalist after showing video montages of their time on the show as well as video messages from family members and friends. Among guests who ask questions from the audience are Darienne Lake, Latrice Royale, and Delta Work.

RuPaul interviews the season's contestants, starting with Tempest DuJour, Sasha Belle, Jasmine Masters, and Mrs. Kasha Davis. Jasmine Masters receives a video message from Patti LaBelle. RuPaul then interviews Kandy Ho, Max, Jaidynn Diore Fierce, and Miss Fame. Jaidynn Diore Fierce receives a video message from her mother. RuPaul interviews Trixie Mattel, Katya, and Kennedy Davenport.

BenDeLaCreme enters the stage attached to Visage, referencing the main challenge of the season's eighth episode "Conjoined Queens". BenDeLaCreme, who is last season's title holder, announces that Katya is this season's Miss Congeniality. The three finalists return to the stage, then last season's winner Bianca Del Rio returns to share an update. RuPaul starts to announce the season's winner, but then invites Katya over to ask for a sip of water. She continues to announce Violet Chachki as the winner, making Ginger Minj and Pearl the runners-up.

== Production and broadcast ==
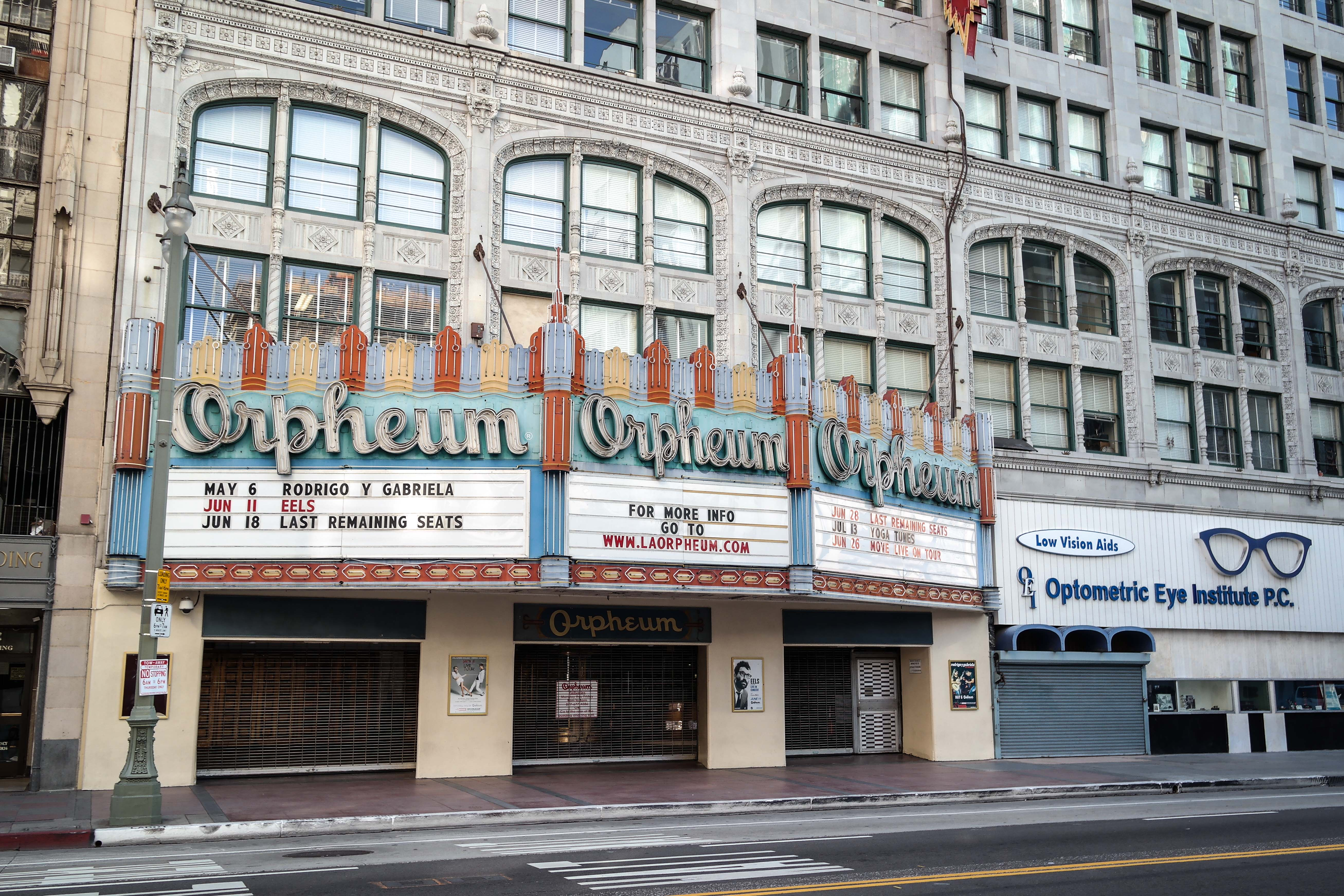
The episode was filmed at the Orpheum Theatre (exterior pictured in 2014) in Los Angeles.

The episode was filmed at the Orpheum Theatre in Los Angeles and originally aired on June 1, 2015. RuPaul acknowledges Victoria "Porkchop" Parker, who is among former contestants in the audience, from the stage. Former contestant Alaska Thunderfuck is also in the audience.

Katya speaks in Russian during her Miss Congeniality acceptance speech.

Each of the contestants released a music video in conjunction with the finale.

=== Fashion ===
Tempest DuJour wears a colorful outfit and a headpiece. Sasha Belle has a purple dress, large earrings, and a long dark wig. Jasmine Masters wears a gown, large earrings, and a dark wig. Mrs. Kasha Davis has large earrings and a red wig. Kandy Ho's dress is black and yellow. Max has a yellow jacket with black astrological signs. Jaidynn Diore Fierce has a sequined dress. Miss Fame wears a purple dress and a blonde wig. Trixie Mattel dress is pink. Katya has a black-and-white outfit with a red-sequined cape and a blonde wig. Kennedy Davenport has a black dress with sequins, purple lips, and a tall dark wig with a purple streak. Ginger Minj's dress is blue. Pearl wears a dress with a corset and a blonde wig. Violet Chackki has a blonde wig. RuPaul has a purple-and-silver dress and a blonde wig.

== Reception ==
Oliver Sava of The A.V. Club gave the episode a rating of 'B'.
