= The DESPY Awards =

- RuPaul's Drag Race episode
- Episode no.: Season 7 Episode 5
- Presented by: RuPaul
- Original air date: March 30, 2015

Guest appearances
- Isaac Mizrahi (guest judge); Kathy Griffin

Episode chronology
← Previous "Spoof! (There It Is)"	Next → "Ru Hollywood Stories"

"The DESPY Awards" is the fifth episode of the seventh season of the American television series RuPaul's Drag Race. It originally aired on March 30, 2015. The episode's main challenge tasks the contestants with presenting awards during a ceremony in which they are also nominees. American fashion designer Isaac Mizrahi is a guest judge. American comedian and actress Kathy Griffin also makes a guest appearance to coach the contestants. Max and Pearl win the main challenge. Mrs. Kasha Davis is eliminated from the competition after placing in the bottom two and losing a lip-sync contest against Kandy Ho to "Lovergirl" (1984) by Teena Marie.

== Episode ==
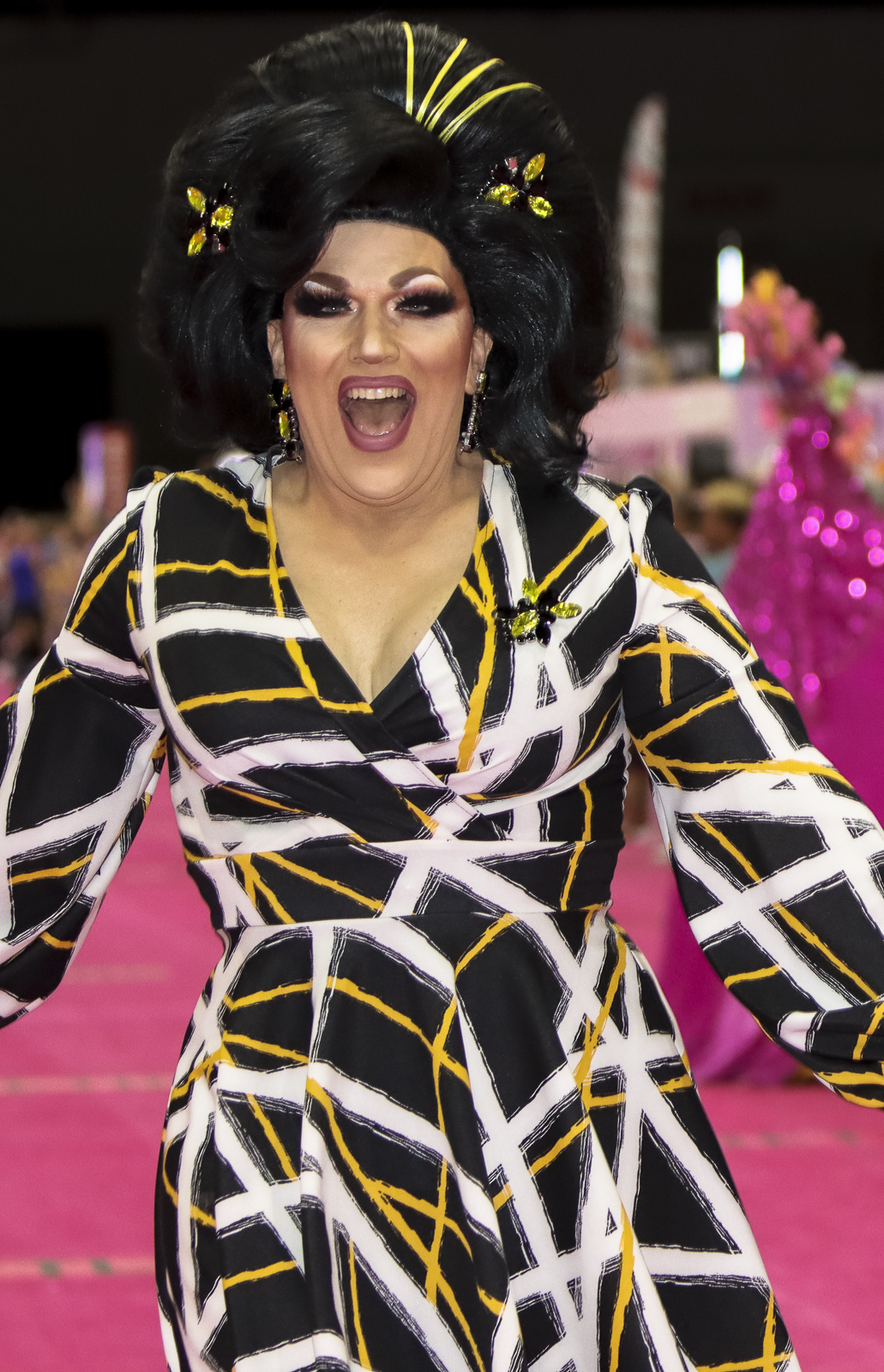
Mrs. Kasha Davis (pictured in 2022) is eliminated from the competition.

The contestants return to the Werk Room after Trixie Mattel's elimination on the previous episode. On a new day, RuPaul greets the group and reveals the mini-challenge, which tasks the contestant with creating replicas of celebrity red carpet looks from paper, in teams of two. The Pit Crew bring in materials, then the contestants create their outfits. Katya and Mrs. Kasha Davis are declared the winners of the mini-challenge.

RuPaul then reveals the main challenge, which tasks the contestants with presenting at the DESPY Awards. The categories are "Sexy, Sexy Drag Queen", "Most Busted Queen", "Shadiest Queen", and "Meatiest Tuck". As the winners of the mini-challenge, Katya and Mrs. Kasha Davis are co-hosts, while the remaining contestants are presenters and award nominees. The contestants begin to write their scripts. RuPaul returns to the Werk Room to meet with each pair, asking questions and offering advice. Pearl takes offense when RuPaul says she does not have a big personality. RuPaul says he was trying to encourage and motivate. During a stare down, Pearl asks, "Do I have something on my face?" RuPaul moves on and Pearl leaves the room for a while. On the main stage, the pairs rehearse with Kathy Griffin. Back in the Werk Room, the contestants vote for who should win in each category and make final preparations for the award ceremony and fashion show. Miss Fame talks about her love of chickens.

On the main stage, RuPaul welcomes fellow judges Michelle Visage and Ross Mathews, as well as guest judge Isaac Mizrahi. The ceremony commences, starting with Katya and Mrs. Kasha Davis as hosts. Jaidynn Diore Fierce and Kennedy Davenport present the award for "Sexy, Sexy Drag Queen", which is won by Miss Fame. Max and Pearl present the award for "Most Busted Queen", which is won by Jaidynn Diore Fierce. Ginger Minj and Kandy Ho present the award for "Shadiest Queen", which is won by Violet Chachki. Miss Fame and Violet Chachki present the award for "Meatiest Tuck", which is won by Katya. RuPaul reveals that Max and Pearl are the winners of the main challenge. The judges deliver their critiques, deliberate, then share the results with the group. Ginger Minj, Katya, Miss Fame, and Violet Chachki are deemed safe. Kandy Ho and Mrs. Kasha Davis place in the bottom two and face off in a lip-sync contest to "Lovergirl" (1984) by Teena Marie. Kandy Ho wins the lip-sync and Mrs. Kasha Davis is eliminated from the competition.

== Production and broadcast ==
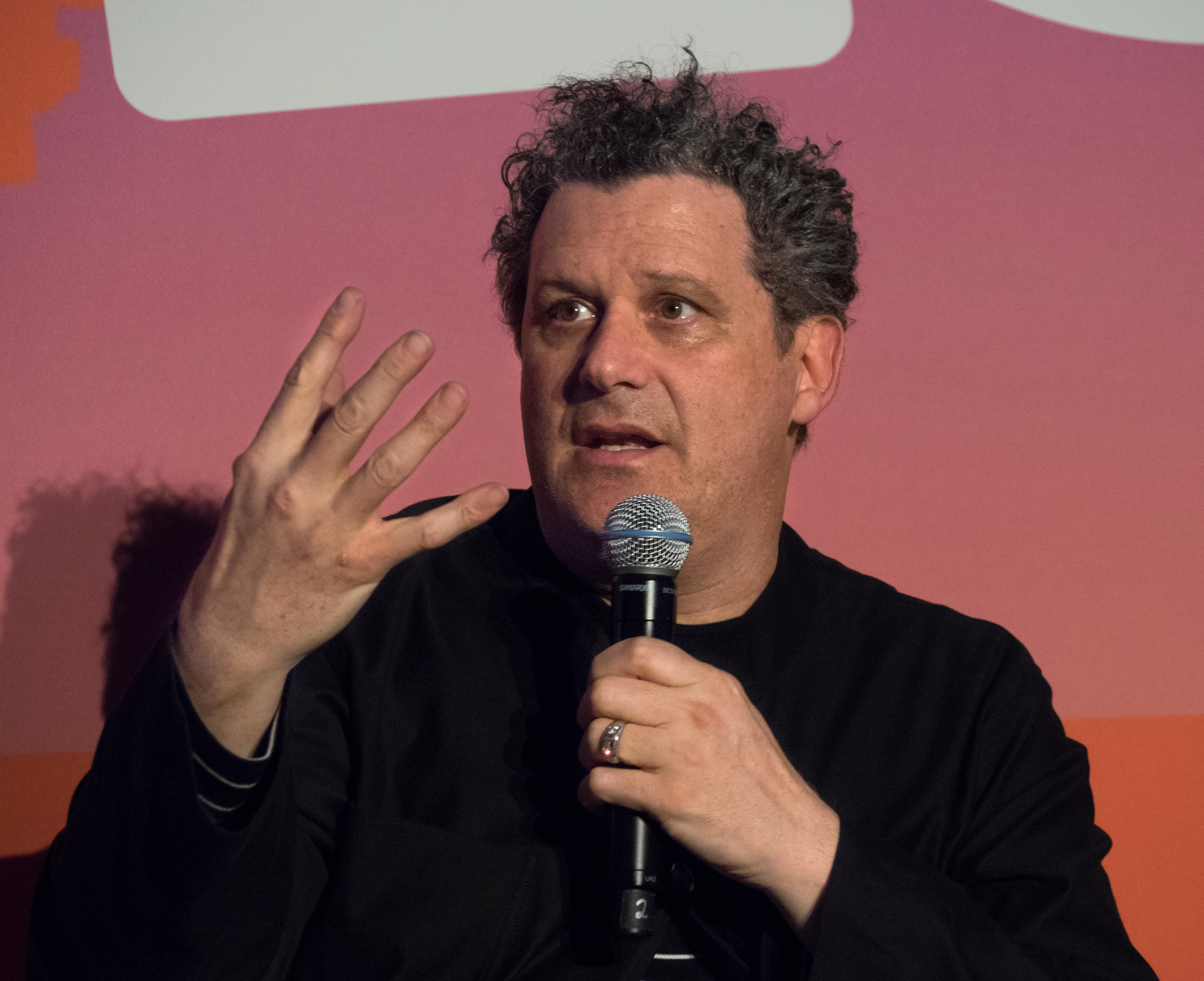
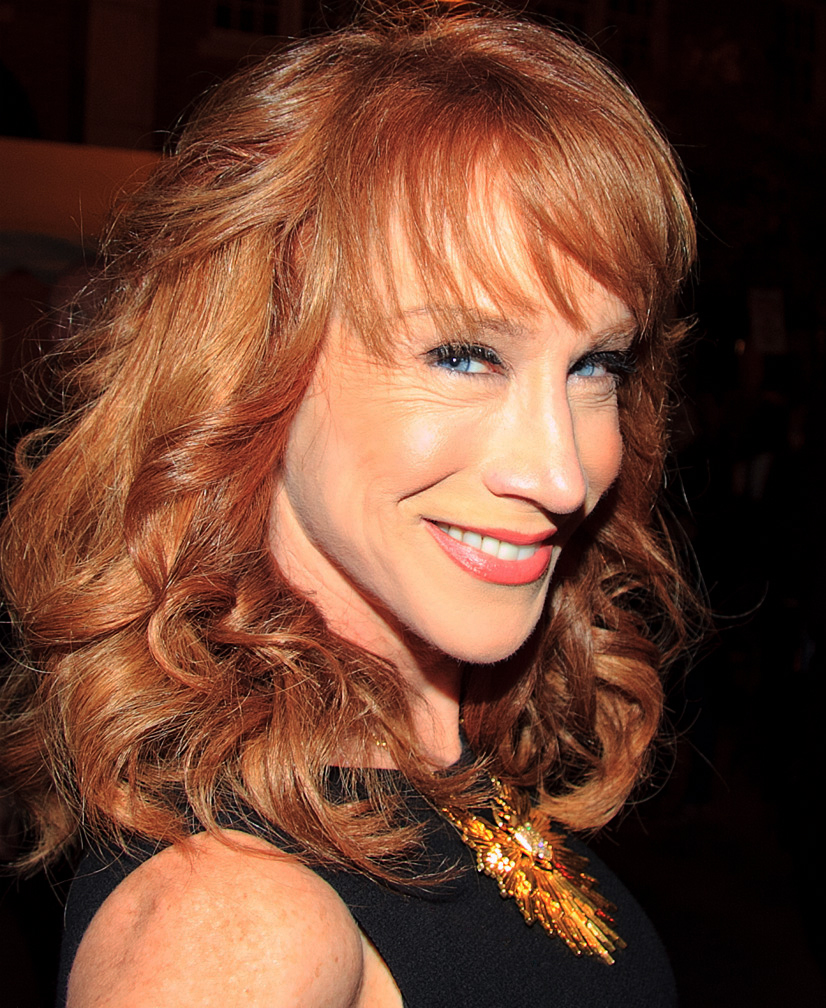
Isaac Mizrahi (left, pictured in 2018) is a guest judge and Kathy Griffin (pictured in 2011) also makes a guest appearance to coach the contestants for the main challenge.

The episode originally aired on March 30, 2015.

Griffin was previously a guest judge on "Born Naked", the first episode of Drag Race's seventh season. Mizrahi was later a guest judge on the season 16 episode "The Mother of All Balls" (2024).

Screen Rant said RuPaul was "clearly fuming" during the Werk Room interaction with Pearl. In 2019, the website's Bernardo Sim wrote, "Despite that awkward interaction, it was only many years after her time on the show that Pearl revealed what her real beef with RuPaul was all about. During an interview on the Hey Qween talk show, Pearl stated that – at some point during the filming of season 7 – RuPaul told her: 'Nothing you say matters unless that camera is rolling.'" According to Instinct magazine, Pearl said on Hey Qween! "that what was shown was very edited down and that the conversation between them went on for an uncomfortable amount of time. Pearl talked to production about the situation after and they were able to calm her down". In 2023, Metro Weekly said the interaction "sparked a feud with RuPaul that likely led to Pearl’s permanent exclusion from future seasons of Drag Race, though of course no one on the show will go so far as to say that out loud." In 2024, PinkNews called the interaction "one of the most awkward and infamous run-ins between RuPaul and a contestant".

=== Fashion ===
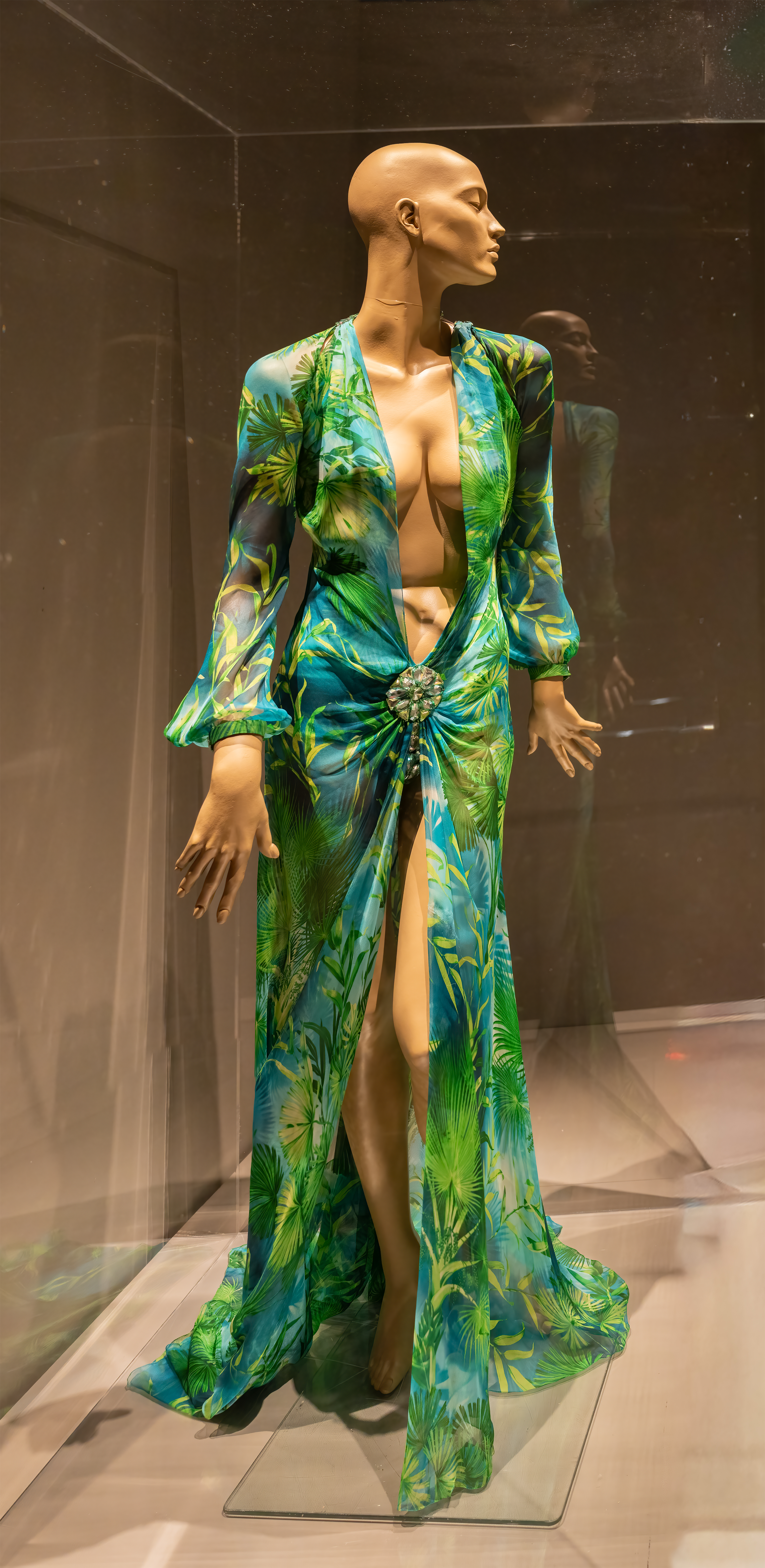
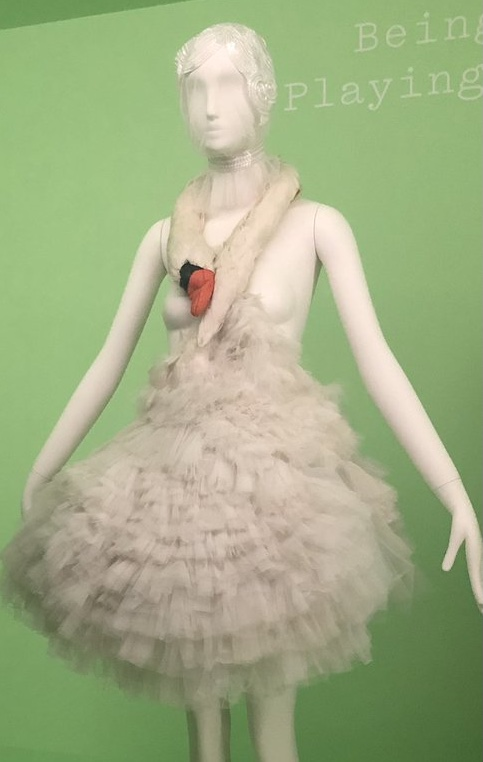
The green Versace dress of Jennifer Lopez (left) and swan dress of Björk (right) are recreated during the mini-challenge.

For the mini-challenge, Ginger Minj and Kandy Ho recreate Lil' Kim's purple pasties look from the 1999 MTV Video Music Awards. Miss Fame and Violet Chachki recreate Jennifer Lopez's green Versace dress. Jaidynn Diore Fierce and Kennedy Davenport recreate Lady Gaga's meat dress. Max (channeling Cher) and Pearl present a Bob Mackie-inspired outfit. Katya wears a version of Björk's swan dress as Mrs. Kasha Davis impersonates Joan Rivers.

For the main stage, RuPaul wears a gold dress and a matching bow in her hair. Mizrahi wears a black-and-white checkered jacket.

For the fashion show, Katya has a sequined pink dress and a blonde wig. Ginger Minj has a large dark wig. Kandy Ho wears a light blue dress, large earrings, and a dark wig. Miss Fame's outfit has a polo neck. She wears matching gloves and a blonde wig. Mrs. Kasha Davis has a silver gown. Violet Chachki has a red wig.

== Reception and legacy ==
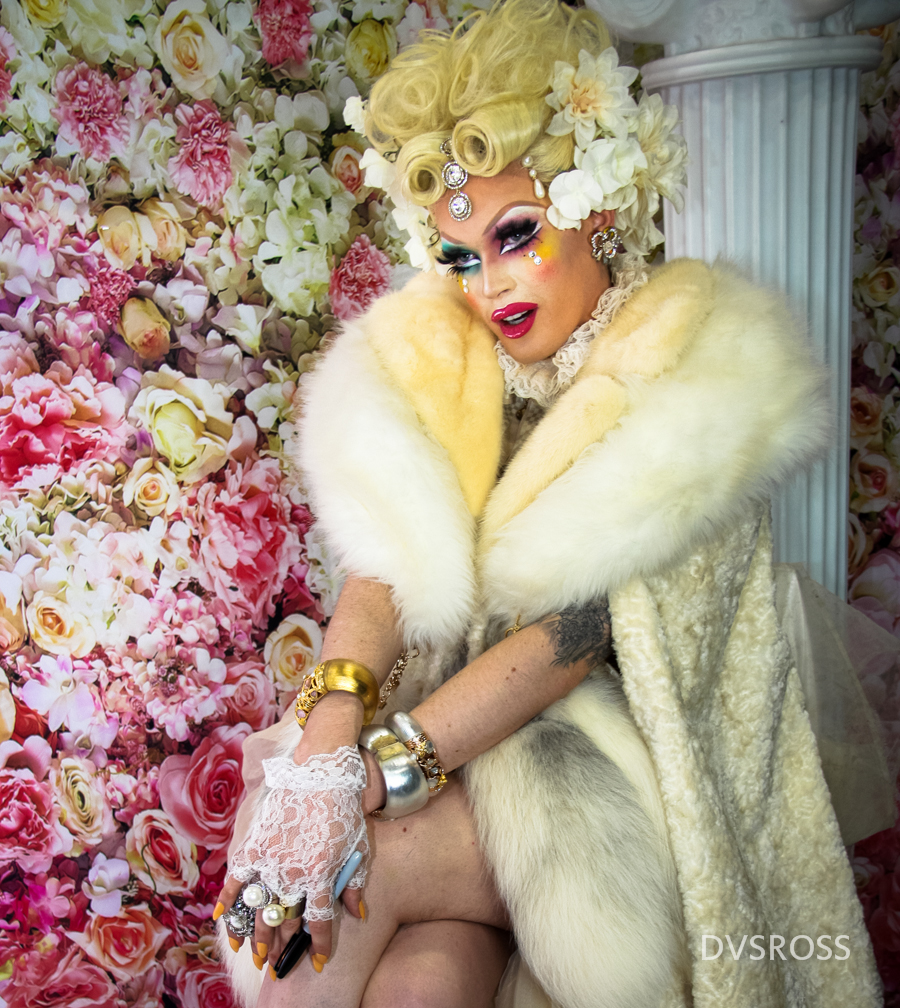
The episode has a heated exchange between RuPaul and contestant Pearl (pictured at RuPaul's DragCon LA in 2018).

Oliver Sava of The A.V. Club gave the episode a rating of 'B-'. In 2023, Bernardo Sim included Max and Pearl's presentation during the award ceremony, as well as Pearl asking RuPaul if she has something on her face, in Out magazine's 2023 lit of fifteen "moments that prove ... season 7 was actually iconic". Sim included "Do I have something on my face?" in the magazine's 2025 list of the show's 32 "best and most hilarious" memes.

Jared Richards ranked the "Lovergirl" performance number 40 in Junkee's 2018 list of the show's 40 "most iconic" lip-sync contests to date. Richard wrote: "Kicking off our list is a forgotten gem of a forgotten '80s hit from two overlooked queens from the underrated season seven. Despite having pretty much no screen-time, Kandy Ho is the season's lip-sync assassin, and here she proves it with a slick slow-burn. Mrs. Kasha Davis gives it a good fight, her drunken housewife aesthetic giving the song a seductive Mrs. Robinson quality." Kevin O'Keeffe ranked "Lovergirl" number 113 in INTO Magazine's 2018 "definitive ranking" of the show's lip-syncs to date. Sam Brooks ranked the performance number 147 in The Spinoff's 2019 "definitive ranking" of the show's 162 lip-syncs to date.

The fifteenth season had a mini-challenge that tasked the contestants with photobombing past scenes from the show. Sasha Colby photobombs RuPaul sitting in the judging panel for the DESPY Awards.
