= Snatch Game (RuPaul's Drag Race season 7) =

- RuPaul's Drag Race episode
- Episode no.: Season 7 Episode 7
- Original air date: April 13, 2015

Guest appearances
- Tamar Braxton (guest judge); Michael Urie (guest judge); Bianca Del Rio

Episode chronology
| ← Previous "Ru Hollywood Stories" | Next → "Conjoined Queens" |
- RuPaul's Drag Race (season 7)

"Snatch Game" is the seventh episode of the seventh season of the American television series RuPaul's Drag Race. It originally aired on April 13, 2015. The episode's main challenge tasks the contestants with impersonating celebrities in the Snatch Game. Michael Urie and Tamar Braxton are guest judges. Bianca Del Rio also makes a guest appearance.

Ginger Minj and Kennedy Davenport win the main challenge. Max is eliminated from the competition after placing in the bottom and losing a lip-sync contest against Jaidynn Diore Fierce to "No More Lies" by Michel'le.

== Episode ==
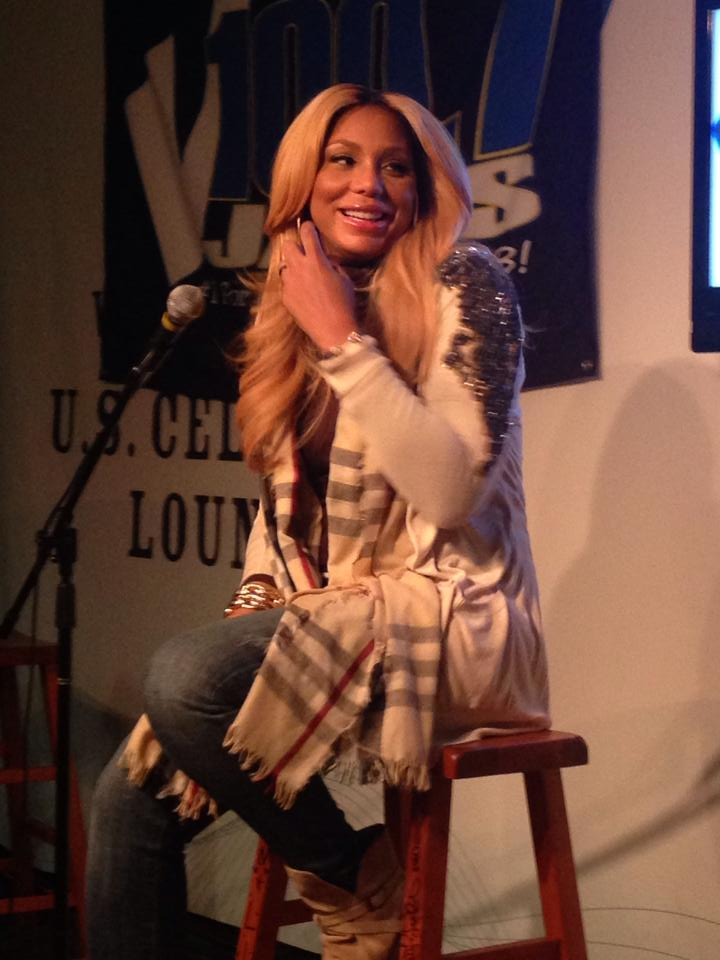
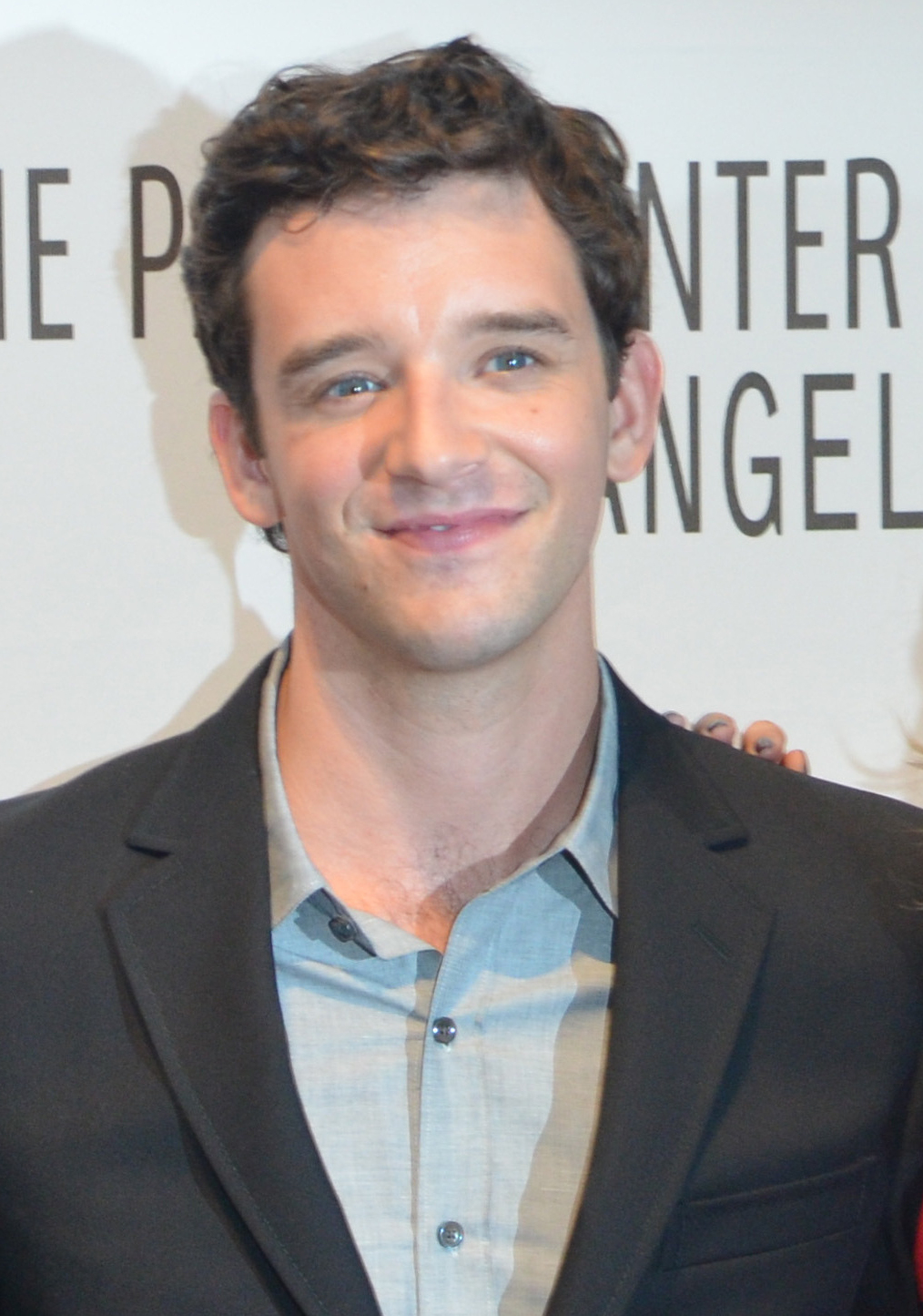
Tamar Braxton (left) and Michael Urie (right) are guest judges.

The contestants return to the workroom after Kandy Ho's elimination on the previous episode. On a new day, RuPaul greets the group and reveals the main challenge, which tasks the contestants with impersonating celebrities in the Snatch Game.

The contestants start to prepare for the game. RuPaul returns to the workroom to meet with each contestant, asking questions and offering advice. The contestants make final preparations, then the game commences with Tamar Braxton and Michael Urie as celebrity guests. Following are the contestants and impersonated celebrities:

- Ginger Minj as Adele
- Jaidynn Diore Fierce as Raven-Symoné
- Kennedy Davenport as Little Richard
- Katya as Suze Orman
- Max as Sharon Needles
- Miss Fame as Donatella Versace
- Pearl as Big Ang
- Violet Chachki as Alyssa Edwards

On elimination day, the contestants make final preparations for the fashion show. Katya discusses her sobriety and seeks counsel from Miss Fame. On the main stage, RuPaul welcomes fellow judges Michelle Visage and Ross Mathews, as well as guest judges Braxton and Urie. RuPaul shares the assignment of the main challenge and the runway category ("Leather and Lace"), then the fashion show commences. The judges deliver their critiques, deliberate, and share the results with the contestants. Ginger Minj and Kennedy Davenport are declared the winners. Jaidynn Diore Fierce and Max place in the bottom and face off in a lip-sync contest to "No More Lies" by Michel'le. Jaidynn Diore Fierce wins the lip-sync and Max is eliminated from the competition. Max returns to the workroom to leave a message for her fellow contestants, then RuPaul tells the remaining contestants that she fears she may have eliminated one of the eliminated contestants too son.

== Production ==
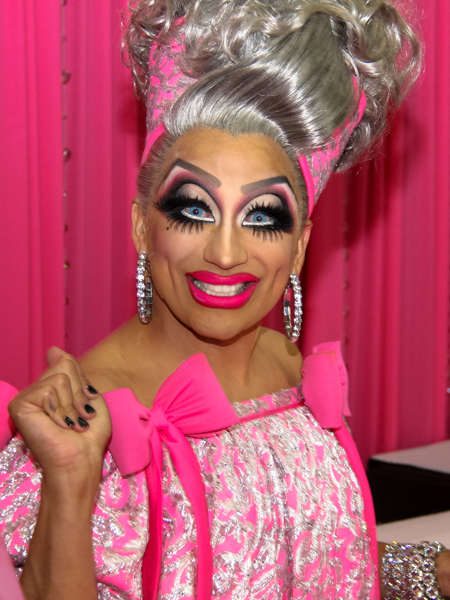
Bianca Del Rio (pictured in 2018) makes a guest appearance in the video before RuPaul's workroom entrance.

The episode originally aired on April 13, 2015. Bianca Del Rio makes a guest appearance in the before RuPaul's workroom entrance.

Miss Fame and Violet Chachki both planned to impersonate Versace. Ginger Minj incorporates "raunchy stereotypes of British people" into her Adele impression, according to Screen Rant.

=== Fashion ===
In the workroom, RuPaul wears a white dress shirt with black polka dots and yellow pants. For the main stage, RuPaul has a red-and-yellow dress, large pink earrings, and a blonde wig.

For the fashion show, Ginger Minj wears a white Elvis Presley-inspired outfit and a dark wig. Katya has a black outfit, matching tall boots, and a blonde wig. Kennedy Davenport wears a black dress and a long dark wig. Violet Chachki has a black outfit and matching tall boots. Max wears a black outfit, a matching headpiece, and a dark wig. Jaidynn Diore Fierce's outfit is a nude illusion. She has a large dark wig. Pearl wears a pink dress, white high-heeled shoes, and a blonde wig. Miss Fame has a black dress, matching high-heels, and a dark wig.

== Reception ==
Oliver Sava of The A.V. Club gave the episode a rating of 'A-'. Sam Brooks ranked the "No More Lies" performance number 68 in The Spinoff's 2019 "definitive ranking" of the show's 162 lip-sync contests to date. In 2026, Bernardo Sim of Out magazine said "Max's elimination is still considered one of the most shocking in Drag Race herstory."
