= Spoof! (There It Is) =

- RuPaul's Drag Race episode
- Episode no.: Season 7 Episode 4
- Presented by: RuPaul

Guest appearances
- Jessica Alba; Lucian Piane

Episode chronology
← Previous "ShakesQueer"	Next → "The DESPY Awards"

"Spoof! (There It Is)" is the fourth episode of the seventh season of the American television series RuPaul's Drag Race. It originally aired on March 23, 2015. The episode's main challenge tasks the contestants with creating music video parodies to songs by RuPaul. Jessica Alba and Lucian Piane are guest judges. Kennedy Davenport wins the main challenge. Trixie Mattel is eliminated from the competition after placing in the bottom and losing a lip-sync contest against Pearl to "Dreaming" by Blondie.

== Episode ==
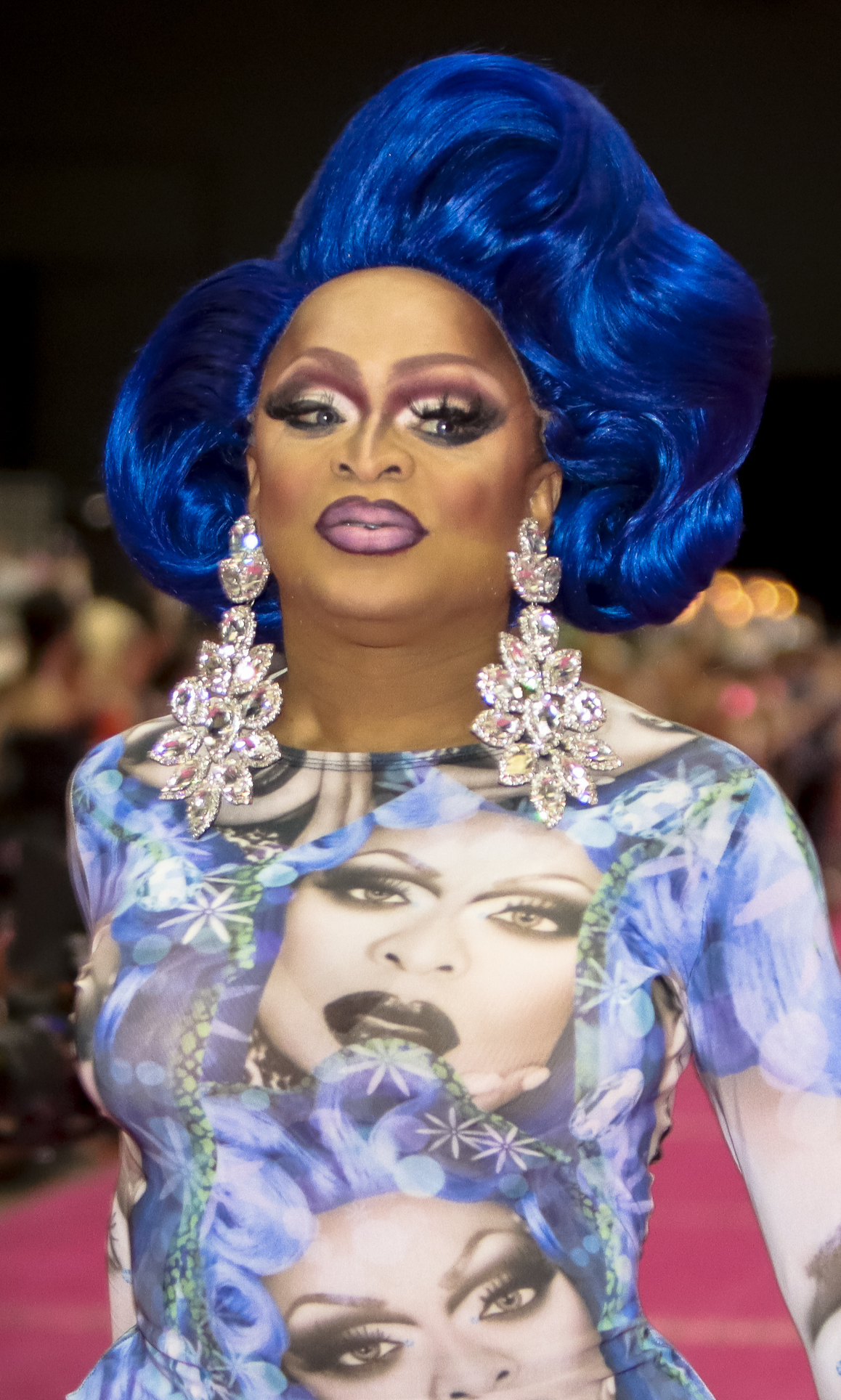
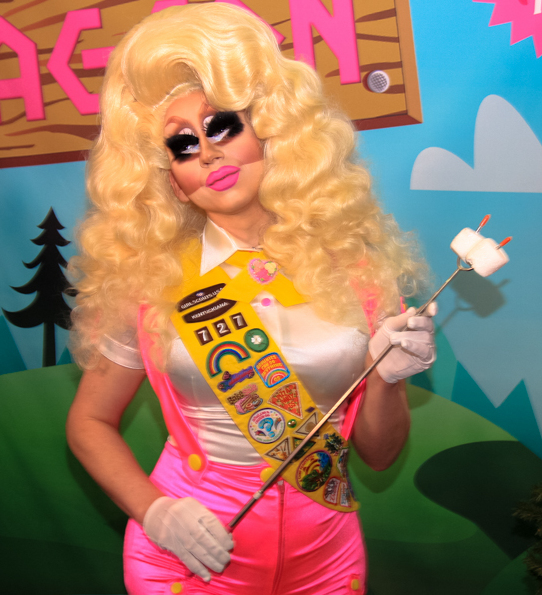
Kennedy Davenport (top, pictured at RuPaul's DragCon LA in 2022) wins the episode's main challenge; Trixie Mattel (bottom, pictured at the 2018 event) is eliminated from the competition.

The contestants return to the Werk Room after Jasmine Masters's elimination on the previous episode. On a new day, RuPaul greets the group and reveals the main challenge, which tasks the contestants with creating music video parodies to songs by RuPaul. The contestants must come up with their own concepts, write original lyrics, record vocals, and film videos. RuPaul asks the contestants to get into their preferred groups. Following are the parodies, inspirations, and team members:

- Team "Get Ready to Clock" (spoof of "Sissy That Walk"): Jaidynn Diore Fierce, Max, and Violet Chachki
- Team "I Got Paid" (spoof of "Let the Music Play"): Ginger Minj, Kandy Ho, Kennedy Davenport, and Mrs. Kasha Davis
- Team "Tan with U" (spoof of "Dance with U"): Katya, Miss Fame, Pearl, and Trixie Mattel

In groups, the contestants develop their concepts. RuPaul returns to the Werk Room to meet with each group, asking questions and offering advice. The groups record vocals with Lucian Piane and an audio engineer, then film the videos with assistance from RuPaul and Michelle Visage. On elimination day, the contestants make final preparations in the Werk Room for the fashion show. Kennedy Davenport discusses her friendship with Sahara Davenport.

On the main stage, RuPaul welcomes fellow judges Visage and Ross Mathews, as well as guest judges Jessica Alba and Piane. RuPaul shares the runway category ("Green"), then the fashion show commences. After the contestants present their looks, the contestants and judges watch the three music videos. The judges deliver their critiques, deliberate, then share the results with the group. Jaidynn Diore Fierce, Katya, and Kennedy Davenport receive positive critiques, and Kennedy Davenport wins the challenge. Kandy Ho, Pearl, and Trixie Mattel receive negative critiques, and Kandy Ho is deemed safe. Pearl and Trixie Mattel place in the bottom and face off in a lip-sync contest to "Dreaming" (1979) by Blondie. Pearl wins the lip-sync and Trixie Mattel is eliminated from the competition.

Katya later reprised her character in the video, Trish, for the Christmas song "Merry Christmas, It’s Whateva".

== Production and broadcast ==
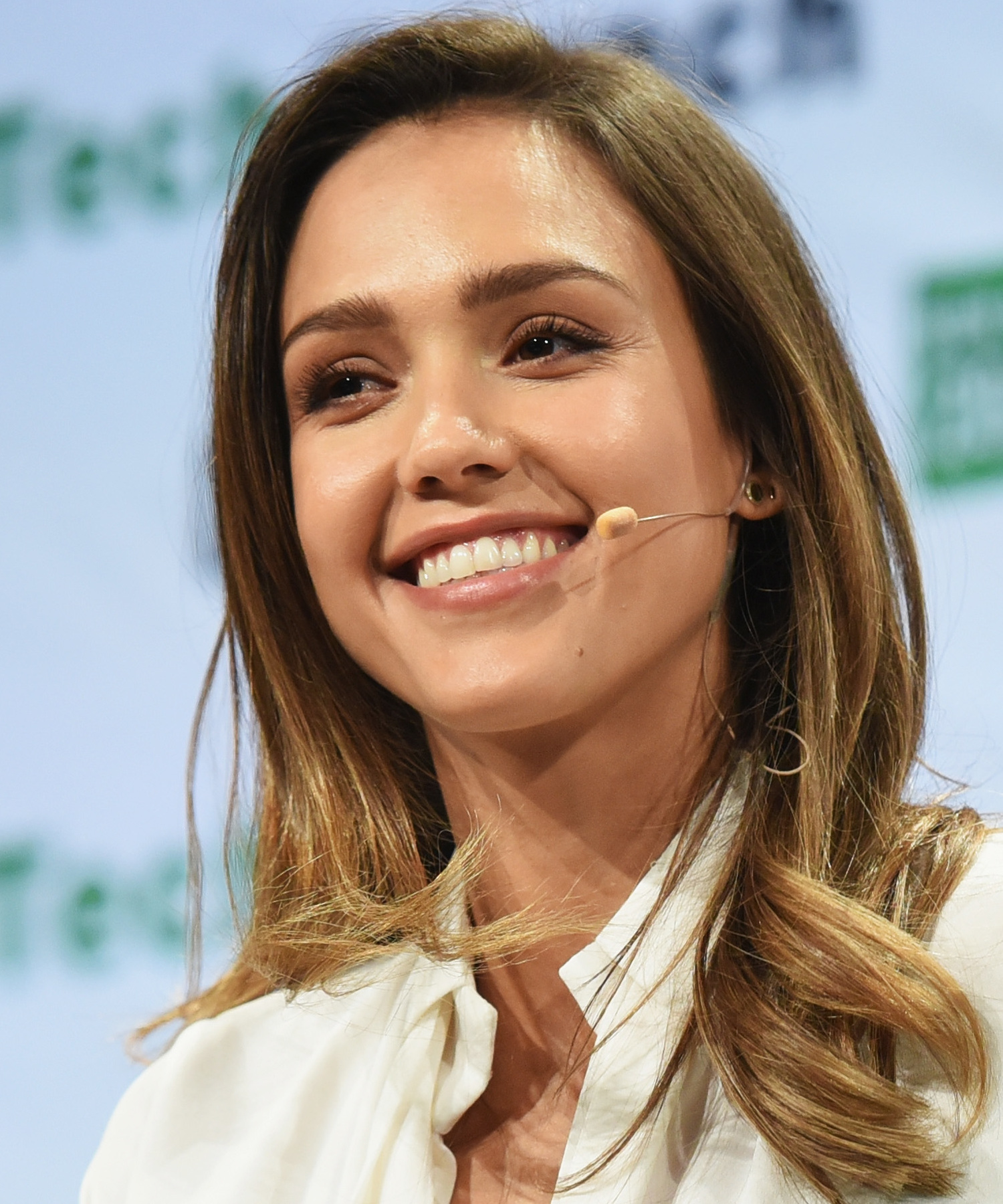
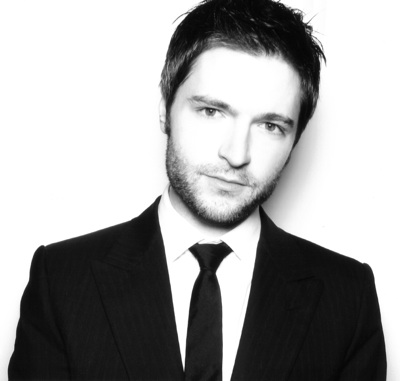
Jessica Alba (top) and Lucian Piane (bottom) are guest judges.

The episode originally aired on March 23, 2015.

Piane had previously been a guest judge on the fourth season's "Frenemies" and appeared in the fifth season's "Can I Get an Amen?" He was also a guest judge on the sixth season's "Shade: The Rusical" and the seventh season's ninth episode "Divine Intervention". Piane would later serve as a guest judge on the eighth season's second ("Bitch Perfect") and fourth ("New Wave Queens") episodes.

For "Get Ready to Clock", the group reference former contestants who had performed "Sissy That Walk" on the show. Jaidynn Diore Fierce impersonates Bianca Del Rio, Max impersonates Courtney Act, and Violet Chacki impersonates Adore Delano.

Trixie Mattel referenced the episode in confessional footage on the third season of RuPaul's Drag Race All Stars. She said, "Do you what it’s like to lose a lip-sync to a partially sedated twink from Brooklyn?" Pearl has said she was harassed and received death threats for eliminating Trixie Mattel. In a 2025 voice memo sent to Katra and Trixie Mattel for their podcast, Pearl said:

People don't understand what it's like to have won that lip sync and then watch Trixie become the Trixie we know and love today. For the last decade, I’ve been slowly publicly executed because of this moment. Somehow I’m 100% at fault. And as much as I appreciate the death threats, perhaps someone would have the wherewithal to blame the actual person who chose to send you home.

=== Fashion ===
For the fashion show, Pearl wears a snake-inspired bodysuit with a headpiece. Miss Fame's dress has shoulder pads. Trixie Mattel has an Asia-inspired dress with a headpiece. Katya has a sequined dress and a large blonde wig. Max has a Marie Antoinette-inspired look with pasties and a grey wig. Jaidynn Diore Fierce's outfit has a camouflage print that includes bright neon. Her wig is green. Violet Chacki has a showgirl-inspired outfit. Kandy Ho has a gown and green in her hair. Mrs. Kasha Davis has a white dress with green dollar signs symbols. She has a boa and her wig is red. Kennedy Davenport has a gown with feathers. Ginger Minj wears a leprechaun-inspired outfit.

== Reception ==
Oliver Sava of The A.V. Club gave the episode a rating of 'B+'. Sam Brooks ranked the "Dreaming" performance number 107 in The Spinoff's 2019 "definitive ranking" of the show's 162 lip-sync contests to date. Billboard's Stephen Daw included "Dreaming" in a 2022 list of ten lip-syncs "that were highway robbery", writing: "Look, everyone knows that Trixie Mattel is not a lip sync assassin — in fact, she has one of the worst lip sync track records on Drag Race (4 losses and 1 win). But this one should’ve gone to her. Trixie served camp, and while her dancing wasn’t great, it was better than Pearl’s strange, soon-to-be-signature stiff arm movements. Trixie nailed the flirty, flippant vibe of the song, while Pearl just looked mad the whole time." Sam Damshenas included the contest in Gay Times's 2024 list of the six "lip-sync verdicts that enraged fans". Damshenas wrote, "Storyline matters on Drag Race, and at the time of Pearl and Trixie Mattel's lip-sync, only one of these queens had an arc the producers could work with. Throughout the season, Pearl was criticised for 'sleepwalking' through the competition, so when the time came for her to fight – to a song called 'Dreaming' no less – Trixie didn't stand a chance, even if a majority of fans preferred her campier, high energy performance."
