= Divine Inspiration (RuPaul's Drag Race) =

- RuPaul's Drag Race episode
- Episode no.: Season 7 Episode 9
- Directed by: Nick Murray
- Original air date: April 27, 2015

Guest appearances
- Demi Lovato; Our Lady J; Lucian Piane; John Waters

Episode chronology
← Previous "Conjoined Queens"	Next → "Prancing Queens"

"Divine Inspiration" is the ninth episode of the seventh season of RuPaul's Drag Race. Directed by Nick Murray, the episode originally aired on April 27, 2015. Demi Lovato and John Waters are guest judges. Lucian Piane and Our Lady J also make guest appearances, helping the contestants during rehearsals.

The episode's main challenge tasks the contestants with performing in musical versions of scenes from two films by Waters: Pink Flamingos (1972) and Female Trouble (1974). Ginger Minj wins the main challenge. Miss Fame is eliminated from the competition after placing in the bottom two and losing a lip-sync contest against Pearl to "Really Don't Care" (2014) by Lovato featuring Cher Lloyd.

== Episode ==
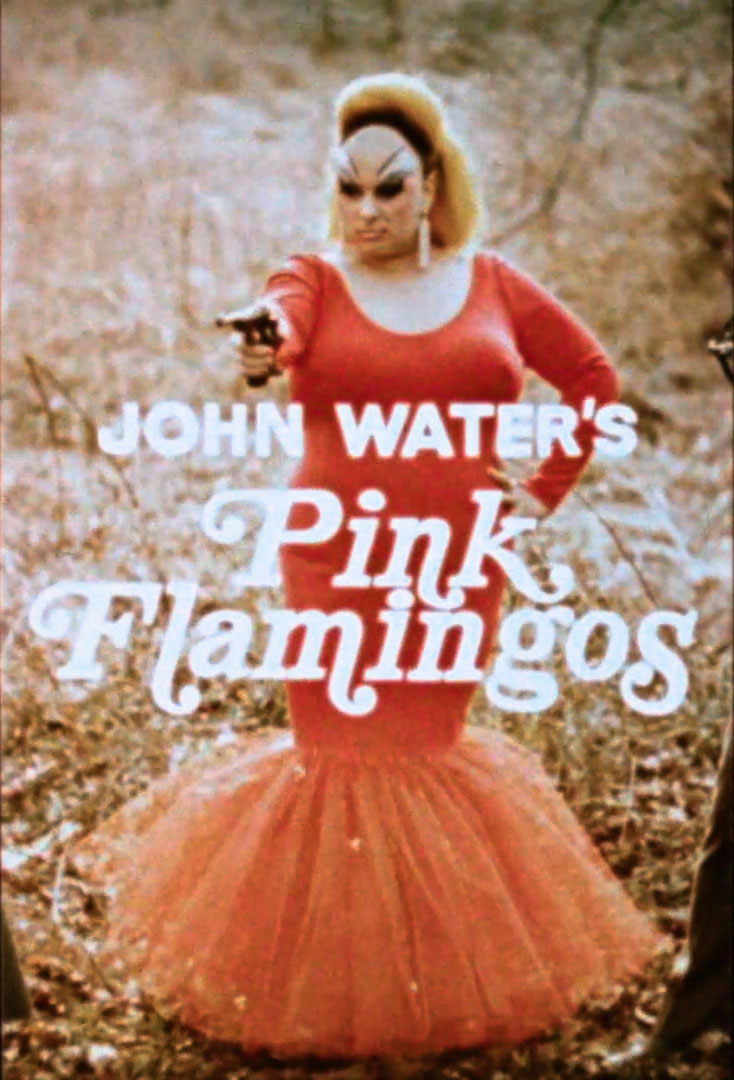
Screenshot from the original 1972 theatrical trailer for the film Pink Flamingos, starring American actor and drag performer Divine

The contestants return to the Werk Room after Jaidynn Diore Fierce's elimination from the competition. On a new day, RuPaul greets the contestants and introduces the episode's mini-challenge, which tasks contestants with "reading" (playfully insulting) each other. Trixie Mattel is deemed the winner of the mini-challenge.

For the main challenge, the contestants are tasked with performing in musical versions of John Waters scenes made famous by Divine. The three teams are Ginger Minj and Trixie Mattel (Team "Eggs"), Kennedy Davenport and Katya, and the trio of Miss Fame, Pearl, and Violet Chachki (Team "Poo"). The scene for Katya and Kennedy Davenport is inspired by Female Trouble (1974). The song for Ginger Minj and Trixie Mattel is inspired by the "Eggman" scene from Pink Flamingos (1972) and the song for the trio is based on the same film.

The contestants break into groups, decide which roles to play, and begin to rehearse lines and choreography. In the Werk Room, RuPaul meets with each group to ask questions and offer advice. The groups then rehearse with judge Michelle Visage, guest composer and music producer Lucian Piane, and musician Our Lady J. As the contestants prepare for the performances and fashion show, Kennedy Davenport talks about the challenges of finding work as a drag queen. Katya shares about her struggle with self-confidence with Miss Fame.

On the main stage, RuPaul welcomes fellow judges Visage and Carson Kressley, as well as guest judges Demi Lovato and Waters. RuPaul shares the runway category "Ugliest Dress Ever" and the fashon show commences. Then, the judges and contestants watch the three scenes recorded by the groups. The judges deliver their critiques to the contestants, then RuPaul asks the contests who they think should be sent home. The judges deliberate while the contestants wait backstage. Waters praises Ginger Minj for her performance and says her "star power" is Divine-esque.

After the contestants return to the main stage, RuPaul shares the results. Ginger Minj is declared the winner of the main challenge. Miss Fame and Pearl place in the bottom two and face off in a lip-sync contest to "Really Don't Care" (2014) by Lovato featuring Cher Lloyd. Pearl wins the lip-sync and Miss Fame is eliminated from the competition.

== Production ==
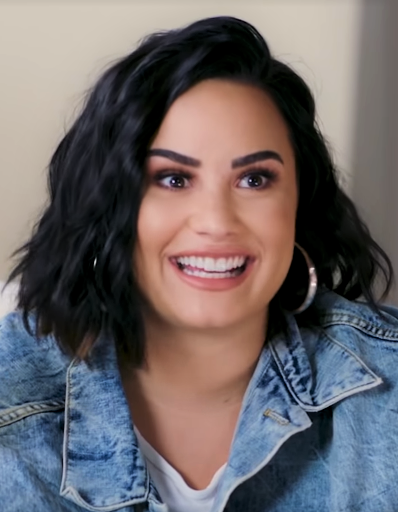
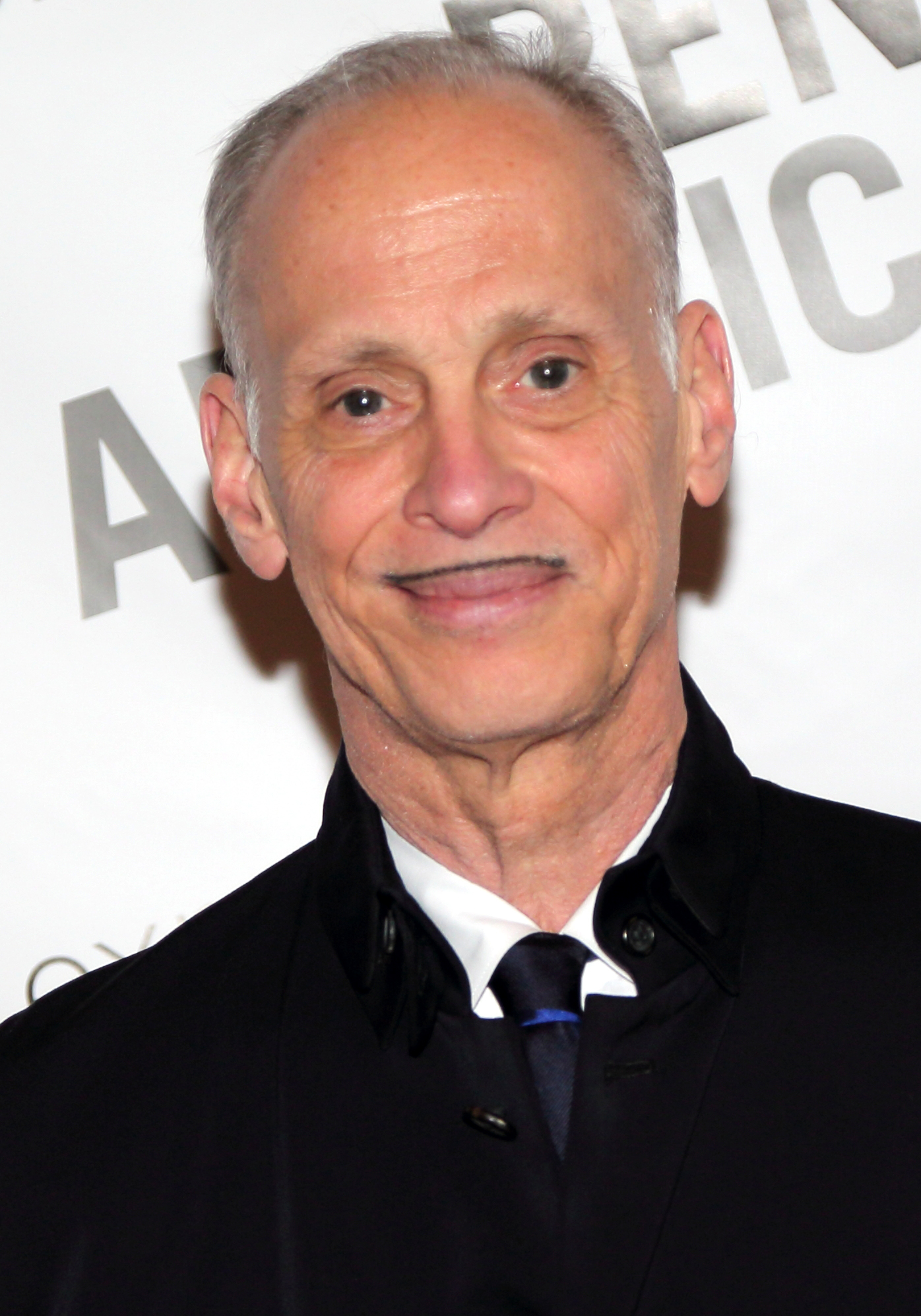
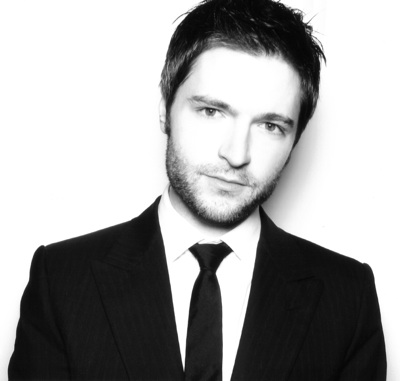
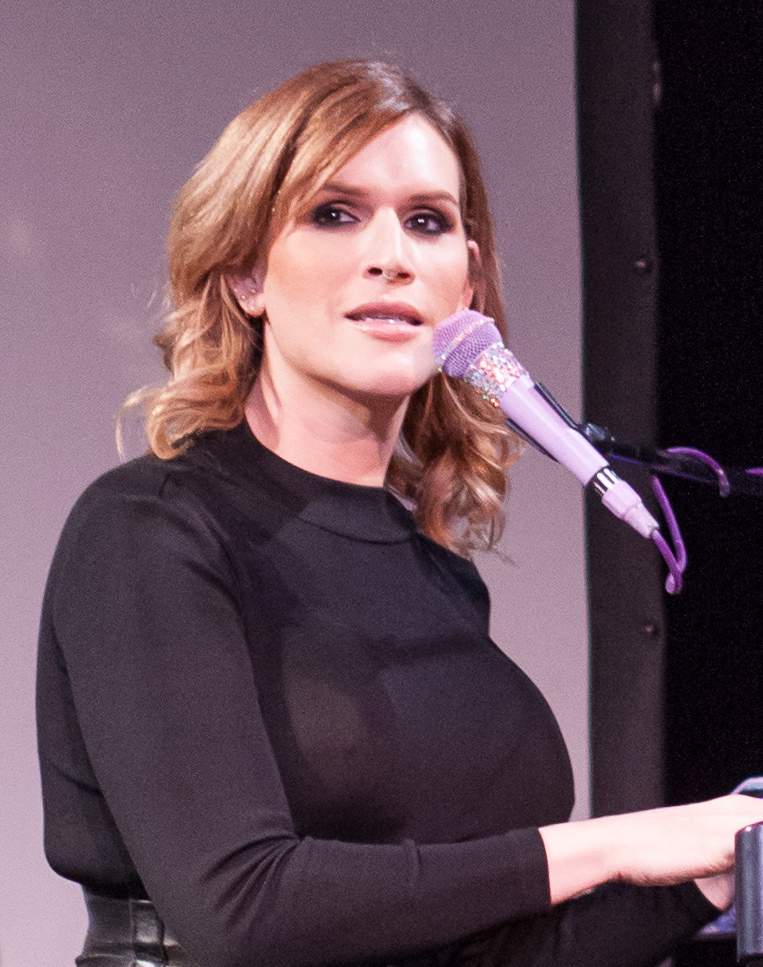
Demi Lovato (top left, pictured in 2020) and John Waters (top right, pictured in 2014) are guest judges on the episode; Lucian Piane (bottom left) and Our Lady J (bottom right, pictured in 2016) also make guest appearances.

The episode was directed by Nick Murray and originally aired on April 27, 2015. Piane had previously been a guest judge on the fourth season's "Frenemies" and appeared in the fifth season's "Can I Get an Amen?" He was also a guest judge on the sixth season's "Shade: The Rusical" and the seventh season's fourth episode "Spoof! (There It Is)". Piane would later serve as a guest judge on the eighth season's second ("Bitch Perfect") and fourth ("New Wave Queens") episodes.

When asked in an interview with The Advocate which character was her favorite to play in the acting challenge, Kennedy Davenport replied: "Divine, of course. It took me completely out of my comfort zone, and I loved it. I was glad that I was able to learn a little bit about her beforehand. That allowed my creative juices to flow and put a little Kennedy stank on it. [Laughs]"

=== Fashion ===
Kenny Davenport presents a "church-lady" look. She has a pearl necklace and a white purse. Katya wears a mostly yellow knitted outfit. Ginger Minj's green dress has polka dots. Trixie Mattel has a 1980s-inspired prom dress. Violet Chachki wears a rainbow-colored clown-inspired outfit. Miss Fame's dress is puffy. According to Out, Pearl wears a Wednesday Addams- and "Japanese schoolgirl"-inspired outfit, and Violet Chachki's outfit "[serves] Phyllis Diller starring as Carol Channing in a late-70s South Beach revival of Hello, Dolly!"

== Reception ==
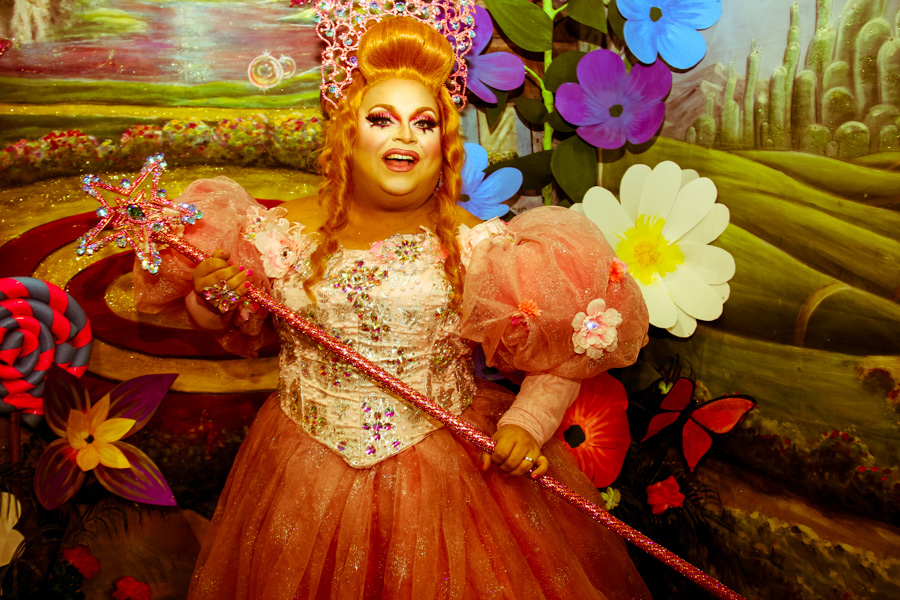
Ginger Minj (pictured at RuPaul's DragCon LA in 2018) wins the episode's main challenge.

Oliver Sava of The A.V. Club gave the episode a rating of 'B+'.

=== Main challenge ===
Stephen Daw ranked Ginger Minj's performance in the "eggs" song fourteenth in Billboard's 2018 overview of the show's fifty best "musical moments". He wrote, "It took the show seven seasons to finally deliver a John Waters-inspired challenge, but when it did, the queens made sure they did it right... Ginger Minj stole the show as a nearly-insane singing adult baby with an insatiable craving for…well, eggs!" In 2019, Sam Damshenas of Gay Times said Ginger Minj's performance demonstrated how she "embodies both camp and comedy." Writing for Screen Rant in 2020, Bernardo Sim pointed to the "eggs" number as evidence of Ginger Minj being among the show's best singers. Sim also included the sketch in Out magazine's 2023 list of fifteen "moments that prove ... season 7 was actually iconic". In 2022, British drag queen The Vivienne, who won the first series of RuPaul's Drag Race UK and competed in the seventh season of RuPaul's Drag Race All Stars, said the "eggs" sketch was among her favorite Drag Race moments.

=== Lip-sync contest ===
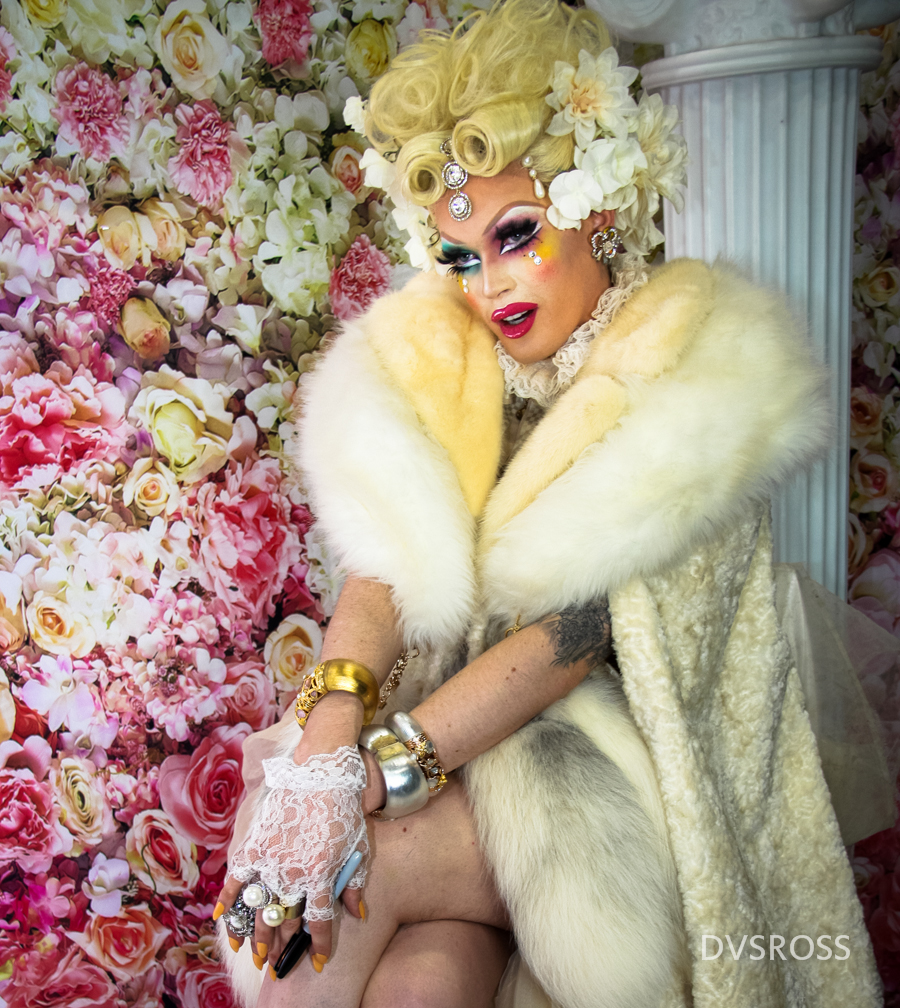
Pearl (pictured at RuPaul's DragCon LA in 2018) wins the lip-sync contest.

According to Jason Fontelieu of The Diamondback, Miss Fame and Pearl "basically stood in place" during the lip-sync contest. In Paper magazine's 2021 overview of "iconic" lip-syncs on the show to songs by Lovato, Matt Moen wrote: "Much like Pearl and Miss Fame's stints on Drag Race, this lip sync was pretty but not terribly memorable in the broader scope of Season 7. That said, it was still a good lip sync and, to their credit, both performers do deliver (which is good because Demi is sitting right there)." Moen said Miss Fame "does give a valiant effort in spite of being hindered by what appears to be a cumbersome maternity dress she has on but Pearl ultimately edges her out with an overall more energetic performance" and continued: "... the clear highlight of this particular lip sync has to be the moment where Pearl and Fame both take the opportunity to flip each other off on the line 'I'll walk right up to you and put one finger in the air.' Having both said the other should go home mere moments before the lip sync, it was clear that the animosity between the two was very real in that moment making it all the more juicy."

Damshenas included "Really Don't Care" in Gay Times's 2024 list of six "lip-sync verdicts that enraged fans", writing:

Double sashays are rare on Drag Race; in 16 years, RuPaul has sent both queens packin’ on three occasions for their banal performances ... but the lip-sync most deserving of the double chop is the infamous 'battle' between Pearl and Miss Fame. To the beat of Demi Lovato's 'Really Don’t Care', in front of the cardiovascular activist the herself, the queens served… nothing. Once again, Pearl wanted viewers to know she had working arms as she maniacally pointer sister'd the stage, while Miss Fame's dress held her back from doing, well, anything. Despite this, it's somewhat reached so-bad-it's-good status.

== See also ==
- Demi Lovato videography
