= RuPaul's Drag Race season 7 =

2015 season of RuPaul's Drag Race

RuPaul's Drag Race
- Season 7
- Promotional poster for season seven
- Hosted by: RuPaul
- Judges: RuPaul; Michelle Visage; Carson Kressley; Ross Mathews
- No. of contestants: 14
- Winner: Violet Chachki
- Runners-up: Ginger Minj; Pearl
- Miss Congeniality: Katya
- Companion show: RuPaul's Drag Race: Untucked!
- No. of episodes: 14

Release
- Original network: Logo TV
- Original release: March 2 – June 1, 2015

Season chronology
- ← Previous; Season 6 Next → Season 8

The seventh season of RuPaul's Drag Race began airing on March 2, 2015. RuPaul and Michelle Visage returned as judges, while the space previously occupied by Santino Rice was filled by new additions Ross Mathews and Carson Kressley. Matthews and Kressley were only both present for the season premiere and took turns sharing judging responsibilities. Shawn Morales, a member of the Pit Crew since the third season and Simon Sherry-Wood, a member in the sixth season, did not appear this season and were replaced by Bryce Eilenberg.

Like the previous two seasons of RuPaul's Drag Race, the season featured 14 contestants competing for the title of "America's Next Drag Superstar", a one-year supply of Anastasia Beverly Hills cosmetics and a cash prize of 100,000 dollars. The season premiere debuted with a live and same-day viewership of 350,000, a 20% increase from the previous season. On March 20, 2015, it was announced that LogoTV had given the series an early renewal for an eighth season.

The theme song played during the runway segment every episode was "Sissy That Walk". Season 6 also featured "Sissy That Walk" as a runway song, making Season 7 the only season to reuse a runway song. The song played during the closing credits was "Fly Tonight", both songs from the album Born Naked.

The winner of the seventh season of RuPaul's Drag Race was Violet Chachki, with Ginger Minj and Pearl being the runners-up.

== Contestants ==
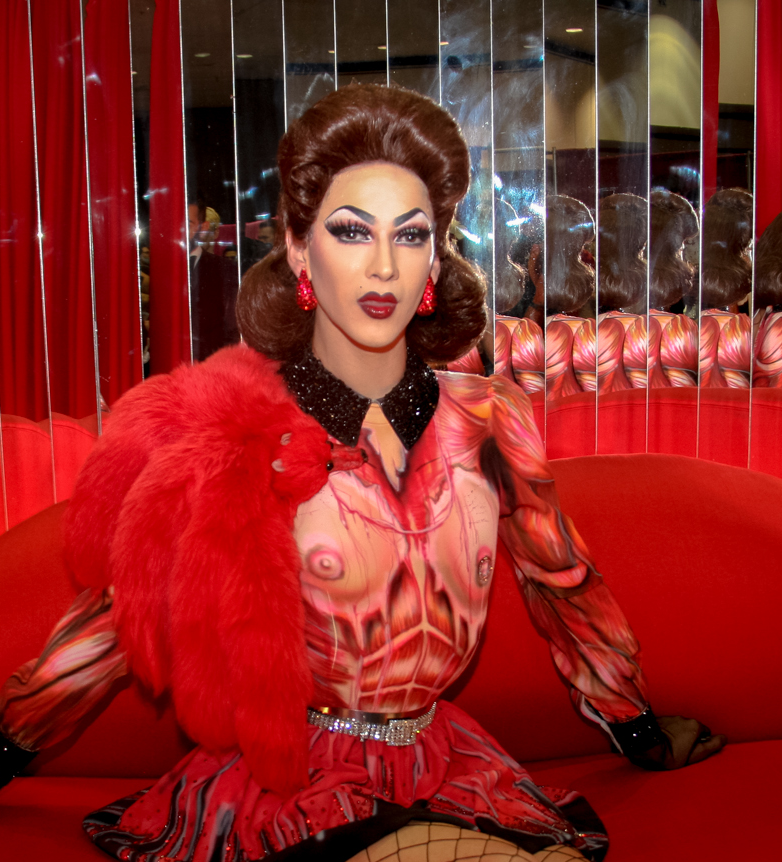
The winner, Violet Chachki.

Ages, names, and cities stated are at time of filming.

Contestants of RuPaul's Drag Race season 7 and their backgrounds
Contestant	Age	Hometown	Outcome
Violet Chachki	22	Atlanta, Georgia	Winner
Ginger Minj	29	Orlando, Florida	Runners-up
Pearl (Note: Pearl Liaison is referred to as Pearl on the show.)	23	New York City, New York	Runners-up
Kennedy Davenport	33	Dallas, Texas	4th place
Katya (Note: Yekaterina Petrovna Zamolodchikova is referred to as Katya on the show.)	32	Boston, Massachusetts	5th place (Note: Katya was voted Miss Congeniality by the viewers.)
Trixie Mattel	24	Milwaukee, Wisconsin	6th place (Note: Trixie Mattel originally placed eleventh before re-entering the competition.)
Miss Fame	29	New York City, New York	7th place
Jaidynn Diore Fierce	25	Nashville, Tennessee	8th place
Max (Note: Max Malanaphy is referred to as Max on the show.)	22	Hudson, Wisconsin	9th place
Kandy Ho	28	Cayey, Puerto Rico	10th place
Mrs. Kasha Davis	43	Rochester, New York	11th place
Jasmine Masters (Note: Jasmine Diane Masters is referred to as Jasmine Masters on the show.)	37	Los Angeles, California	12th place
Sasha Belle	28	Iowa City, Iowa	13th place
Tempest DuJour	46	Tucson, Arizona	14th place

== Contestant progress ==
Legend:

Violet Chachki won RuPaul's Drag Race season 7.
Ginger Minj and Pearl were the runners-up.
Katya was voted Miss Congeniality (Miss C) by the viewers.
WIN indicates that the contestant won the challenge.
IN indicates that the contestant won re-entry into the competition.
SAFE indicates that the contestant was declared safe by the judges.
BTM (Bottom) indicates that the contestant was up for elimination.
ELIM (Eliminated) indicates that the contestant was eliminated.
LOSS indicates that the contestant returned to win re-entry into the competition, but lost.
Guest indicates that the contestant returned as a guest.

Contestants progress with placements in each episode
Contestant	Episode												
Contestant	1	2	3	4	5	6	7	8	9	10	11	12	14
Violet Chachki	WIN	SAFE	SAFE	SAFE	SAFE	SAFE	SAFE	SAFE	SAFE	WIN	WIN	SAFE	Winner
Ginger Minj	SAFE	WIN	SAFE	SAFE	SAFE	SAFE	WIN	BTM	WIN	BTM	SAFE	SAFE	Runner-up
Pearl	SAFE	SAFE	SAFE	BTM	WIN	SAFE	SAFE	WIN	BTM	SAFE	SAFE	SAFE	Runner-up
Kennedy Davenport	SAFE	SAFE	BTM	WIN	SAFE	SAFE	WIN	SAFE	SAFE	SAFE	BTM	ELIM	Guest
Katya	SAFE	BTM	SAFE	SAFE	SAFE	WIN	SAFE	SAFE	SAFE	WIN	ELIM		Miss C
Trixie Mattel	SAFE	SAFE	SAFE	ELIM				IN	SAFE	ELIM			Guest
Miss Fame	SAFE	SAFE	SAFE	SAFE	SAFE	SAFE	SAFE	SAFE	ELIM				Guest
Jaidynn Diore Fierce	SAFE	SAFE	SAFE	SAFE	SAFE	BTM	BTM	ELIM					Guest
Max	SAFE	SAFE	WIN	SAFE	WIN	SAFE	ELIM	LOSS					Guest
Kandy Ho	BTM	SAFE	SAFE	SAFE	BTM	ELIM		LOSS					Guest
Mrs. Kasha Davis	SAFE	SAFE	SAFE	SAFE	ELIM			LOSS					Guest
Jasmine Masters	SAFE	SAFE	ELIM					LOSS					Guest
Sasha Belle	SAFE	ELIM						LOSS					Guest
Tempest DuJour	ELIM							LOSS					Guest

== Lip syncs ==
Legend:

The contestant was eliminated after their first time in the bottom.
The contestant was eliminated after their second time in the bottom.
The contestant was eliminated after their third time in the bottom.
The contestant was eliminated after the lip sync to qualify for the finale.

Episode	Contestants			Song	Eliminated
1	Kandy Ho	vs.	Tempest DuJour	"Geronimo" (RuPaul ft. Lucian Piane)	Tempest DuJour
2	Katya	vs.	Sasha Belle	"Twist of Fate" (Olivia Newton-John)	Sasha Belle
3	Jasmine Masters	vs.	Kennedy Davenport	"I Was Gonna Cancel" (Kylie Minogue)	Jasmine Masters
4	Pearl	vs.	Trixie Mattel	"Dreaming" (Blondie)	Trixie Mattel
5	Kandy Ho	vs.	Mrs. Kasha Davis	"Lovergirl" (Teena Marie)	Mrs. Kasha Davis
6	Jaidynn Diore Fierce	vs.	Kandy Ho	"Break Free" (Ariana Grande ft. Zedd)	Kandy Ho
7	Jaidynn Diore Fierce	vs.	Max	"No More Lies" (Michel'le)	Max
8	Ginger Minj (with Sasha Belle)	vs.	Jaidynn Diore Fierce (with Tempest DuJour)	"I Think We're Alone Now" (Tiffany)	Jaidynn Diore Fierce
9	Miss Fame	vs.	Pearl	"Really Don't Care" (Demi Lovato ft. Cher Lloyd)	Miss Fame
10	Ginger Minj	vs.	Trixie Mattel	"Show Me Love" (Robin S.)	Trixie Mattel
11	Katya	vs.	Kennedy Davenport	"Roar" (Katy Perry)	Katya
12	Ginger Minj vs. Kennedy Davenport vs. Pearl vs. Violet Chachki			"Born Naked" (RuPaul ft. Clairy Browne)	Kennedy Davenport

== Guest judges ==
Listed in chronological order:

- Kathy Griffin, comedian
- Olivia Newton-John, actress and singer
- Jordin Sparks, singer and actress
- Mel B, singer
- Kat Dennings, actress
- Jessica Alba, actress
- Lucian Piane, composer and music producer
- Isaac Mizrahi, fashion designer
- Merle Ginsberg, journalist
- Ariana Grande, singer and actress
- Tamar Braxton, singer and television personality
- Michael Urie, actor
- LeAnn Rimes, singer
- Nelsan Ellis, actor
- Demi Lovato, singer and actress
- John Waters, director
- Alyssa Milano, actress
- Rachael Harris, actress and comedian
- Santino Rice, fashion designer
- Rebecca Romijn, actress

=== Special guests ===
Guests who appeared in episodes, but did not judge on the main stage:

Episode 1

- Alaska, runner-up of season 5
- Mathu Andersen, photographer and makeup artist
- Magnus Hastings, photographer

Episode 2

- Moby, musician
- Jamal Sims, choreographer

Episode 5

- Kathy Griffin, comedian

Episode 7

- Bianca Del Rio, winner of season 6

Episode 8

- Latrice Royale, Miss Congeniality of season 4 and contestant on All Stars season 1

Episode 10

- Kym Johnson, professional dancer

Episode 12

- Candis Cayne, choreographer

Episode 14

- Patti LaBelle, singer and actress (via video message)
- Delta Work, contestant on season 3
- Latrice Royale, Miss Congeniality of season 4 and contestant on All Stars season 1
- Alaska, contestant on season 5
- Gia Gunn, contestant on season 6
- BenDeLaCreme, Miss Congeniality of season 6
- Bianca Del Rio, winner of season 6

== Episodes ==
No. overall	No. in season	Title	Original release date
80	1	"Born Naked"	March 2, 2015
Fourteen new queens enter the workroom. For the first mini-challenge, the queens walk the runway showing off two looks: one from their spring collection and one from their fall collection. For the main challenge, the queens create a resort-wear tearaway to reveal a nude illusion. On the runway, category is Nude Illusion. Kennedy Davenport, Miss Fame and Violet Chachki receive positive critiques, with Violet Chachki winning the challenge. Jasmine Masters, Kandy Ho, Sasha Belle and Tempest DuJour receive negative critiques, with Jasmine Masters and Sasha Belle being safe. Kandy Ho and Tempest DuJour lip-sync to "Geronimo" by RuPaul. Kandy Ho wins the lip-sync and Tempest DuJour is the first queen to sashay away.: Guest Judge: Kathy Griffin; Alternating Judges: Ross Mathews and Carson Kressley; Mini-Challenge: Walk the runway showing off two looks: one from their spring collection and one from their fall collection; Main Challenge: Create a resort-wear tearaway to reveal a nude illusion; Runway Theme: Nude Illusion; Challenge Winner: Violet Chachki; Challenge Prize: Dekoy hair care products; Bottom Two: Kandy Ho and Tempest DuJour; Lip-Sync Song: "Geronimo" by RuPaul; Eliminated: Tempest DuJour; Farewell Message: "Love yourself. Live your truth. You're never too old to dream. xoxo, Tempest"
81	2	"Glamazonian Airways"	March 9, 2015
For this week's mini-challenge, the queens give face while the pit crew blows them with a leaf blower. Ginger Minj and Trixie Mattel win the mini-challenge. For the main challenge, the queens team up and perform a mash-up of spoken word and song for a pre-flight safety video for Glamazonian Airways.: Team Ginger Minj: Ginger Minj, Jaidynn Diore Fierce, Jasmine Masters, Kandy Ho, Kennedy Davenport, Mrs. Kasha Davis and Sasha Belle; Team Trixie Mattel: Katya, Max, Miss Fame, Pearl, Trixie Mattel and Violet Chachki; On the runway, category is Jet Set Eleganza. Ginger Minj, Mrs. Kasha Davis and Violet Chachki receive positive critiques, with Ginger Minj winning the challenge. Katya, Miss Fame and Sasha Belle receive negative critiques, with Miss Fame being safe. Katya and Sasha Belle lip-sync to "Twist of Fate" by Olivia Newton-John. Katya wins the lip-sync and Sasha Belle sashays away.: Guest Judges: Jordin Sparks and Olivia Newton-John; Alternating Judge: Carson Kressley; Mini-Challenge: Give face while the pit-crew blows them with a leaf blower; Mini-Challenge Winners: Ginger Minj and Trixie Mattel; Main Challenge: In teams, perform a mash-up of spoken word and song for a pre-flight safety video for Glamazonian Airways; Runway Theme: Jet Set Eleganza; Challenge Winner: Ginger Minj; Challenge Prize: A five-night luxury hotel accommodations courtesy of My Gay Getaway; Bottom Two: Katya and Sasha Belle; Lip-Sync Song: "Twist of Fate" by Olivia Newton-John; Eliminated: Sasha Belle; Farewell Message: "Love you, MEAN it! Ging for the win :)"
82	3	"ShakesQueer"	March 16, 2015
For this week's mini-challenge, the queens dress up in "granny drag" and dance with walkers and canes. Kennedy Davenport and Max win the mini-challenge. For the main challenge, the queens team up and star in two twisted Shakespeare classics: MacBitch and Romy and Juliet.: Team MacBitch: Jasmine Masters, Kandy Ho, Katya, Kennedy Davenport, Pearl and Violet Chachki; Team Romy and Juliet: Ginger Minj, Jaidynn Diore Fierce, Max, Miss Fame, Mrs. Kasha Davis and Trixie Mattel; On the runway, category is Bearded and Beautiful. Team Romy and Juliet is the winning team, with Max winning the challenge. Team MacBitch is the losing team. Jasmine Masters, Kennedy Davenport and Pearl receive negative critiques, with Pearl being safe. Jasmine Masters and Kennedy Davenport lip-sync to "I Was Gonna Cancel" by Kylie Minogue. Kennedy Davenport wins the lip-sync and Jasmine Masters sashays away.: Guest Judges: Mel B and Kat Dennings; Alternating Judge: Carson Kressley; Mini-Challenge: Dress up in "granny drag" and dance with walkers and canes; Mini-Challenge Winners: Kennedy Davenport and Max; Main Challenge: In teams, star in two twisted Shakespeare classics: MacBitch and Romy and Juliet; Runway Theme: Bearded and Beautiful; Challenge Winner: Max; Challenge Prize: Two couture latex creations, courtesy of Syren Latex; Bottom Two: Jasmine Masters and Kennedy Davenport; Lip-Sync Song: "I Was Gonna Cancel" by Kylie Minogue; Eliminated: Jasmine Masters; Farewell Message: "Best of Luck Ladies, Luv Jasmine"
83	4	"Spoof! (There It Is)"	March 23, 2015
For this week's main challenge, the queens team up and create a music video parody to one of RuPaul's songs.: Team Get Ready to Clock (spoof of "Sissy That Walk"): Jaidynn Diore Fierce, Max and Violet Chachki; Team I Got Paid (spoof of Let The Music Play): Ginger Minj, Kandy Ho, Kennedy Davenport and Mrs. Kasha Davis; Team Tan With U (spoof of Dance With U): Katya, Miss Fame, Pearl and Trixie Mattel; On the runway, category is Green. Jaidynn Diore Fierce, Katya and Kennedy Davenport receive positive critiques, with Kennedy Davenport winning the challenge. Kando Ho, Pearl and Trixie Mattel receive negative critiques, with Kando Ho being safe. Pearl and Trixie Mattel lip-sync to "Dreaming" by Blondie. Pearl wins the lip-sync and Trixie Mattel sashays away.: Guest Judges: Jessica Alba and Lucian Piane; Alternating Judge: Ross Mathews; Main Challenge: In teams, create a music video parody to one of RuPaul's songs; Runway Theme: Green; Challenge Winner: Kennedy Davenport; Challenge Prize: A 3 year supply of essential family products from The Honest Company; Bottom Two: Pearl and Trixie Mattel; Lip-Sync Song: "Dreaming" by Blondie; Eliminated: Trixie Mattel; Farewell Message: "Wear clown noses! Make fun of each other! Stay Plastic ❤️ Trixie Mattel. P.S. Fame - I used your lipstick, sorry :)"
84	5	"The DESPY Awards"	March 30, 2015
For this week's mini-challenge, the queens pair up and make their own paper versions of classic celebrity red carpet outfits. Katya and Mrs. Kasha Davis win the mini-challenge. For the main challenge, the queens have to come up with funny banter and take jabs at the other queens while presenting awards for different categories at the first ever DESPY Awards. The awards were as follows: Sexy, Sexy Drag Queen, presented by Jaidynn Diore Fierce and Kennedy Davenport, won by Miss Fame; Most Busted Queen, presented by Max and Pearl, won by Jaidynn Diore Fierce; Shadiest Queen, presented by Ginger Minj and Kandy Ho, won by Violet Chachki; Meatiest Tuck, presented by Miss Fame and Violet Chachki, won by Katya; On the runway, Jaidynn Diore Fierce, Kennedy Davenport, Max and Pearl receive positive critiques, with Max and Pearl both winning the challenge. Kandy Ho, Mrs. Kasha Davis and Violet Chachki receive negative critiques, with Violet Chachki being safe. Kandy Ho and Mrs. Kasha Davis lip-sync to "Lovergirl" by Teena Marie. Kandy Ho wins the lip-sync and Mrs. Kasha Davis sashays away.: Guest Judges: Isaac Mizrahi; Alternating Judge: Ross Mathews; Mini-Challenge: In pairs, make your own paper versions of classic celebrity red carpet outfits; Mini-Challenge Winners: Katya and Mrs. Kasha Davis; Main Challenge: Come up with funny banter and take jabs at the other queens while presenting awards for different categories at the first ever DESPY Awards; Challenge Winners: Max and Pearl; Challenge Prize: A custom jewel packages, courtesy of Fierce Drag Jewels; Bottom Two: Kandy Ho and Mrs. Kasha Davis; Lip-Sync Song: "Lovergirl" by Teena Marie; Eliminated: Mrs. Kasha Davis; Farewell Message: "Be good to yourself. Be good to one another. Love to the moon & back! xo MKD. (Go Ginger)"
85	6	"Ru Hollywood Stories"	April 6, 2015
For this week's mini-challenge, the queens have to gain points by selecting pit crew members while avoiding the one with a monster in his pants. Ginger Minj wins the mini-challenge. For the main challenge, the queens have to re-enact "Whatever Happened to Merle Ginsberg" from the point of view of Merle Ginsberg, Michelle Visage and RuPaul.: Team Merle Ginsberg: Ginger Minj, Katya and Kennedy Davenport; Team Michelle Visage: Kandy Ho, Max and Violet Chachki; Team RuPaul: Jaidynn Diore Fierce, Miss Fame and Pearl; On the runway, category is Death Becomes Her. Team Merle Ginsberg is the winning team, with Katya winning the challenge. Team Michelle Visage and RuPaul are the losing teams. Jaidynn Diore Fierce, Kandy Ho and Miss Fame receive negative critiques, with Miss Fame being safe. Jaidynn Diore Fierce and Kandy Ho lip-sync to "Break Free" by Ariana Grande. Jaidynn Diore Fierce wins the lip-sync and Kandy Ho sashays away.: Guest Judges: Ariana Grande and Merle Ginsberg; Alternating Judge: Ross Mathews; Mini-Challenge: Gain points by selecting pit crew members while avoiding the one with a monster in his pants; Mini-Challenge Winner: Ginger Minj; Main Challenge: Re-enact "Whatever Happened to Merle Ginsberg" from the point of view of Merle Ginsberg, Michelle Visage and RuPaul; Runway Theme: Death Becomes Her; Challenge Winner: Katya; Challenge Prize: A $2000 giftcard to FABRICplanet; Bottom Two: Jaidynn Diore Fierce and Kandy Ho; Lip-Sync Song: "Break Free" by Ariana Grande; Eliminated: Kandy Ho; Farewell Message: "Everything happens 4 a reason, pero la vida continua! Big things will come! Kandy Ho xoxo"
86	7	"Snatch Game"	April 13, 2015
For this week's main challenge, the queens play the Snatch Game. Michael Urie and Tamar Braxton star as the celebrity contestants. The cast consisted of: Ginger Minj as Adele; Jaidynn Diore Fierce as Raven-Symoné; Kennedy Davenport as Little Richard; Katya as Suze Orman; Max as Sharon Needles; Miss Fame as Donatella Versace; Pearl as Big Ang; Violet Chachki as Alyssa Edwards; On the runway, category is Leather and Lace. Ginger Minj, Katya and Kennedy Davenport receive positive critiques, with Ginger Minj and Kennedy Davenport both winning the challenge. Jaidynn Diore Fierce, Max and Miss Fame receive negative critiques, with Miss Fame being safe. Jaidynn Diore Fierce and Max lip-sync to "No More Lies" by Michel'le. Jaidynn Diore Fierce wins the lip-sync and Max sashays away.: Guest Judge: Michael Urie and Tamar Braxton; Alternating Judge: Ross Mathews; Main Challenge: Snatch Game; Runway Theme: Leather and Lace; Challenge Winners: Ginger Minj and Kennedy Davenport; Challenge Prize: Feather accessories from Mother Plucker; Bottom Two: Jaidynn Diore Fierce and Max; Lip-Sync Song: "No More Lies" by Michel'le; Eliminated: Max; Farewell Message: "Stay kind. Stay gracious. Stay humble. I love you, darlings. Xx Max"
87	8	"Conjoined Queens"	April 20, 2015
For this week's mini-challenge, the queens recreate prison uniforms as "Orange is the new Drag" fashion looks. Kennedy Davenport wins the mini-challenge. For the main challenge, the queens create a conjoined twin makeover with a previously eliminated queen. RuPaul then reveals whichever pair wins the challenge, the eliminated queen will officially return to the competition.: Ginger Minj and Sasha Belle; Jaidynn Diore Fierce and Tempest DuJour; Katya and Mrs. Kasha Davis; Kennedy Davenport and Jasmine Masters; Miss Fame and Kandy Ho; Pearl and Trixie Mattel; Violet Chachki and Max; On the runway, Katya, Pearl and Violet Chachki receive positive critiques, with Pearl winning the challenge, meaning Trixie Mattel has returned to the competition. Ginger Minj, Jaidynn Diore Fierce and Miss Fame receive negative critiques, with Miss Fame being safe. Ginger Minj and Jaidynn Diore Fierce lip-sync to "I Think We're Alone Now" by Tiffany along with their conjoined twins Sasha Belle and Tempest DuJour, respectively. Ginger Minj wins the lip-sync and Jaidynn Diore Fierce sashays away.: Guest Judge: LeAnn Rimes and Nelsan Ellis; Alternating Judge: Ross Mathews; Mini-Challenge: Recreate prison uniforms as "Orange is the new Drag" fashion looks; Mini-Challenge Winner: Kennedy Davenport; Main Challenge: Create a conjoined twin makeover with a previously eliminated queen; Challenge Winner: Pearl; Challenge Prize: A custom website by Square Space; Returned: Trixie Mattel; Bottom Two: Ginger Minj (with Sasha Belle) and Jaidynn Diore Fierce (with Tempest DuJour); Lip-Sync Song: "I Think We're Alone Now" by Tiffany; Eliminated: Jaidynn Diore Fierce; Farewell Message: "Stay Fierce! Werq that puss! I love you all xoxo Jaidynn Diore Fierce ❤️"
88	9	"Divine Inspiration"	April 27, 2015
For this week's mini-challenge, the queens read each other to filth. Trixie Mattel wins the mini-challenge. For the main challenge, the queens star in musical versions of iconic films by John Waters.: Team Cha Cha Heels (parody of Female Trouble): Katya and Kennedy Davenport; Team Eggs (parody of Pink Flamingos): Ginger Minj and Trixie Mattel; Team Poo (parody of Pink Flamingos): Miss Fame, Pearl and Violet Chachki; On the runway, category is Ugliest Dress. Ginger Minj, Katya and Kennedy Davenport receive positive critiques, with Ginger Minj winning the challenge. Miss Fame, Pearl and Violet Chachki receive negative critiques, with Violet Chachki being safe. Miss Fame and Pearl lip-sync to "Really Don't Care" by Demi Lovato ft. Cher Lloyd. Pearl wins the lip-sync and Miss Fame sashays away.: Guest Judge: Demi Lovato and John Waters; Alternating Judge: Carson Kressley; Mini-Challenge: Reading is Fundamental; Mini-Challenge Winner: Trixie Mattel; Main Challenge: Star in musical versions of iconic films by John Waters; Runway Theme: Ugliest Dress; Challenge Winner: Ginger Minj; Challenge Prize: A hair collection by Weavin' Steven; Bottom Two: Miss Fame and Pearl; Lip-Sync Song: "Really Don't Care" by Demi Lovato ft. Cher Lloyd; Eliminated: Miss Fame; Farewell Message: "Continue to inspire. You are incredible! I love you. FAME."
89	10	"Prancing Queens"	May 4, 2015
For this week's mini-challenge, the queens create a "Fake Housewives of Drag Race" look using tape. Violet Chachki wins the mini-challenge. For the main challenge, the queens pair up and dance in a live drag dance spectacular.: Ginger Minj and Trixie Mattel: Hoedown and Robot; Katya and Violet Chachki: Tango and Vogue; Kennedy Davenport and Pearl: Charleston and Twerk; On the runway, category is Half Man, Half Queen. Katya and Violet Chachki receive positive critiques, with both queens winning the challenge. Ginger Minj and Trixie Mattel receive negative critiques, and are announced as the bottom two. They lip-sync to "Show Me Love" by Robin S. Ginger Minj wins the lip-sync and Trixie Mattel sashays away.: Guest Judge: Alyssa Milano and Rachael Harris; Alternating Judge: Carson Kressley; Mini-Challenge: Create a "Fake Housewives of Drag Race" look using tape; Mini-Challenge Winner: Violet Chachki; Main Challenge: In pairs, dance in a live drag dance spectacular; Runway Theme: Half Man, Half Queen; Challenge Winners: Katya and Violet Chachki; Challenge Prize: An original gown from Mountbatten Concepts and a gift card from Klein Epstein & Parker; Bottom Two: Ginger Minj and Trixie Mattel; Lip-Sync Song: "Show Me Love" by Robin S.; Eliminated: Trixie Mattel; Farewell Message: "WTF Just Happened?!? #GirlBye, Thx Pearl. Stay Plastic ❤️ Spoiler Alert Trixie Mattel Doesn't Win LOL"
90	11	"Hello, Kitty Girls!"	May 11, 2015
For this week's mini-challenge, the queens have a bitchfest with puppets. Ginger Minj wins the mini-challenge. For the main challenge, the queens create two looks for The Hello Kitty Ball: Hello Kitty BFF and Hello Kitty Eleganza. On the runway, Ginger Minj, Pearl and Violet Chachki receive positive critiques, with Violet Chachki winning the challenge. Katya and Kennedy Davenport receive negative critiques, are announced as the bottom two. They lip-sync to "Roar" by Katy Perry. Kennedy Davenport wins the lip-sync and Katya sashays away.: Guest Judge: Rebecca Romijn and Santino Rice; Alternating Judge: Carson Kressley; Mini-Challenge: Everybody Loves Puppets; Mini-Challenge Winner: Ginger Minj; Main Challenge: The Hello Kitty Ball; Runway Themes: Hello Kitty BFF and Hello Kitty Eleganza; Challenge Winner: Violet Chachki; Challenge Prize: Hello Kitty Extravaganza Package; Bottom Two: Katya and Kennedy Davenport; Lip-Sync Song: "Roar" by Katy Perry; Eliminated: Katya; Farewell Message: "Девочки! Я вас люблю! If you need me, you know where to find me. (The dumpster out back) XOXO Katya AKA The Brooke Hogan of drag AKA Diarrhea Perlman ❤️❤️❤️"
91	12	"And the Rest Is Drag"	May 18, 2015
For the final challenge of the season, the queens star in RuPaul's music video "Born Naked". On the runway, category is Best Drag. The four remaining queens lip-sync to "Born Naked" by RuPaul ft. Clairy Browne. Kennedy Davenport is then eliminated, with Ginger Minj, Pearl and Violet Chachki being the finalists of the season.: Alternating Judges: Ross Mathews and Carson Kressley; Main Challenge: Star in RuPaul's music video "Born Naked"; Runway Theme: Best Drag; Lip-Sync Song: "Born Naked" by RuPaul ft. Clairy Browne; Eliminated: Kennedy Davenport
92	13	"Countdown to the Crown"	May 25, 2015
This episode took a look back on the highlights, low-lights, and previously unseen footage from the season using various countdowns. The show included commentary from past contestants including Adore Delano, Alaska, Alyssa Edwards, Bianca Del Rio, Jinkx Monsoon, Jujubee, Latrice Royale, Raja, Raven and Sharon Needles.
93	14	"Grand Finale"	June 1, 2015
All the queens return for the live grand finale. The finalists all lip-sync to a song specifically written for them. Ginger Minj lip-syncs to "Pray and Slay", Pearl lip-syncs to "Sleep Walker" and Violet Chachki lip-syncs to "Too Many Daddies". It is then announced that Katya is this season's Miss Congeniality. It is then announced that Violet Chachki is the winner, leaving Ginger Minj and Pearl as the runners-up.: Finals venue: Orpheum Theatre; Miss Congeniality: Katya; Runners-up: Ginger Minj and Pearl; Winner of RuPaul's Drag Race Season Seven: Violet Chachki

== Soundtrack ==
The trailers for this season featured clips of the songs "Geronimo" and "Modern Love", both of the album Born Naked.

=== RuPaul Presents: CoverGurlz 2 ===
RuPaul Presents: CoverGurlz 2

Compilation album by RuPaul
- Released: February 3, 2015
- Recorded: 2014
- Genre: Dance
- Length: 54:32
- Label: World of Wonder

RuPaul chronology
Born Naked (2014)	RuPaul Presents: CoverGurlz 2 (2015)	Realness (2015)

RuPaul Presents: CoverGurlz 2 is a 2015 compilation album by entertainer RuPaul, featuring the season 7 cast of his show RuPaul's Drag Race. The album was released digitally on February 3, 2015.

==== Background ====
Similar to last season, the compilation consists of 14 covers of songs previously released by RuPaul, performed by all of the RuPaul's Drag Race season seven contestants. It features tracks originally from RuPaul's albums Born Naked, Glamazon, Red Hot, Starrbooty: Original Motion Picture Soundtrack, SuperGlam DQ.

==== Track listing ====
All songs were written by RuPaul Charles and Lucian Piane, with the exception of tracks fifteen and sixteen, which were written solely by Charles himself.

No.	Title	Length
1.	"New York City Beat" (featuring Michelle Visage)	3:54
2.	"Throw Ya Hands Up" (featuring Kennedy Davenport)	3:19
3.	"Freaky Money" (featuring Jasmine Masters)	3:22
4.	"Can I Get an Amen" (featuring Mrs. Kasha Davis)	3:14
5.	"Drop That Pimp" (featuring Violet Chachki and Miles Davis Moody)	2:39
6.	"Let the Music Play" (featuring Ginger Minj)	4:32
7.	"Sweet Kandy of Mine" (featuring Kandy Ho)	2:40
8.	"Drag U" (featuring Katya)	3:05
9.	"Hey Booty" (featuring Pearl and Miles Davis Moody)	2:49
10.	"Geronimo" (featuring Trixie Mattel)	2:58
11.	"The Beginning" (featuring Jaidynn Diore Fierce)	3:58
12.	"Call Me Starrbooty" (featuring Sasha Belle)	3:15
13.	"Dance with U" (featuring Max)	3:58
14.	"Drag Race Theme" (featuring Miss Fame)	3:07
15.	"Sissy That Walk" (featuring Tempest DuJour)	3:26
16.	"Hollywood U.S.A." (featuring The PitCrew)	4:16
Total length:		54:32

== Ratings ==
Episode no.	Title	Airdate	Rating (18–49)	Total viewers
1	"Born Naked"	March 2, 2015	0.19	348,000
2	"Glamazonian Airways"	March 9, 2015	0.21	374,000
3	"ShakesQueer"	March 16, 2015	0.15	265,000
4	"Spoof! (There It Is)"	March 23, 2015	0.18	325,000
5	"The DESPY Awards"	March 30, 2015	0.23	404,000
6	"Ru Hollywood Stories"	April 6, 2015	0.16	285,000
7	"Snatch Game"	April 13, 2015	0.19	340,000
8	"Conjoined Queens"	April 20, 2015	0.19	367,000
9	"Divine Inspiration"	April 27, 2015	0.17	320,000
10	"Prancing Queens"	May 4, 2015	0.16	263,000
11	"Hello, Kitty Girls!"	May 11, 2015	0.16	266,000
12	"And the Rest Is a Drag"	May 18, 2015	0.17	310,000
13	"Countdown to the Crown"	May 25, 2015	0.09	229,000
14	"Grand Finale"	June 1, 2015	0.18	387,000

== See also ==
- List of Rusicals
