= Conjoined Queens =

- RuPaul's Drag Race episode
- Episode no.: Season 7 Episode 8
- Presented by: RuPaul
- Original air date: April 20, 2015

Guest appearances
- Nelsan Ellis (guest judge); LeAnn Rimes (guest judge); Latrice Royale

Episode chronology
← Previous "Snatch Game"	Next → "Divine Inspiration"

"Conjoined Queens" is the eighth episode of the seventh season of the American television series RuPaul's Drag Race. It originally aired on April 20, 2015. The episode's main challenge tasks the contestants with creating looks in pairs to resemble conjoined twins. Nelsan Ellis and LeAnn Rimes are guest judges. Former contestant Latrice Royale also makes a guest appearance for the mini-challenge. Jaidynn Diore Fierce is eliminated from the competition after placing in the bottom two pairs and losing a lip-sync contest against her teammate Tempest DuJour as well as Ginger Minj and Sasha Belle to "I Think We're Alone Now" by Tiffany.

== Episode ==
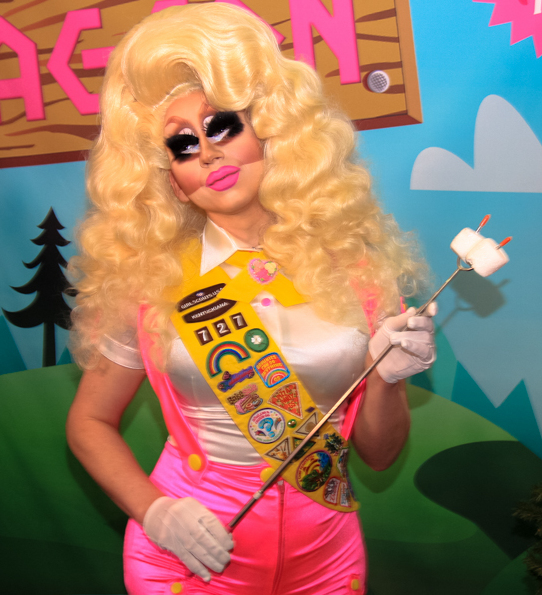
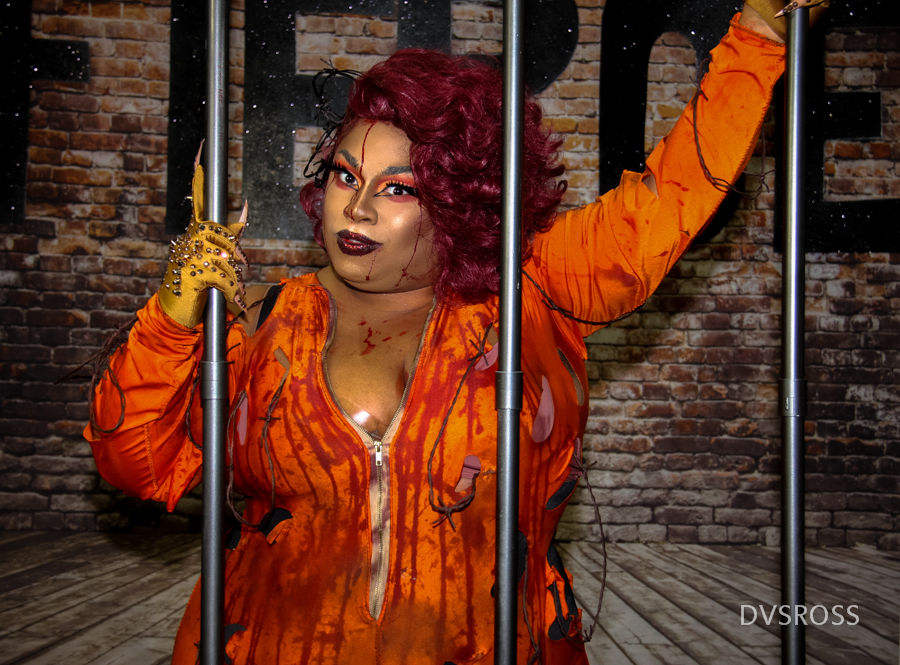
The episode sees Trixie Mattel (top, pictured at RuPaul's DragCon LA in 2018) return to the competition; Jaidynn Diore Fierce (bottom, pictured at the same event) is eliminated from the competition.

The contestants return to the Werk Room after Max's elimination on the previous episode. On a new day, RuPaul greets the group with former contestant Latrice Royale as a guest. RuPaul reveals the mini-challenge ("Orange Is the New Drag"), which tasks the contestants with presenting prison-inspired looks. Members of the Pit Crew bring in materials, then the contestants have 20 minutes to get into drag. Latrice Royale reprises her role as a prison officer in Tuckahoe Prison from "Queens Behind Bars". Kennedy Davenport wins the mini-challenge.

RuPaul reminds the group that someone will be returning to the competition, then invites the season's eliminated contestants into the Werk Room. RuPaul reveals the main challenge, which tasks the contestants with presenting looks in pairs to resemble conjoined twins. He explains that each pair will have one eliminated and one non-eliminated contestant, and that the eliminated contestant of the winning team will return to the competition. As the winner of the mini-challenge, Kennedy Davenport gets to assign the teams. The teams are: Jasmine Masters and Kennedy Davenport, Ginger Minj and Sasha Belle, Jaidynn Diore Fierce and Tempest DuJour, Kandy Ho and Miss Fame, Katya and Mrs. Kasha Davis, Max and Violet Chachki, and Pearl and Trixie Mattel.

The pairs brainstorm and start to create their concepts and outfits. RuPaul returns to the Werk Room to meet with each pair, asking questions and offering advice. Mrs. Kasha Davis compliments Violet Chachki for how she has matured during the competition. Ginger Minj shares with Katya about the nervousness she is feeling. On elimination day, the contestants make final preparations for the fashion show. Tempest DuJour talks about her experience with conversion therapy. Some of the other contestants talk about their families, and Trixie Mattel talks about abuse.

On the main stage, RuPaul welcomes fellow judges Michelle Visage and Ross Mathews, as well as guest judges Nelsan Ellis and LeAnn Rimes. The fashion show commences. After the pairs present their looks, the judges deliver their critiques, deliberate, then share the results with the group. The bottom two teams were Jaidynn Diore Fierce with Tempest DuJour and Ginger Minj with Sasha Belle. The four contestants face off in a lip-sync contest to "I Think We're Alone Now" by Tiffany. Jaidynn Diore Fierce is eliminated from the competition. Trixie Mattel re-entered the competition.

== Production and broadcast ==
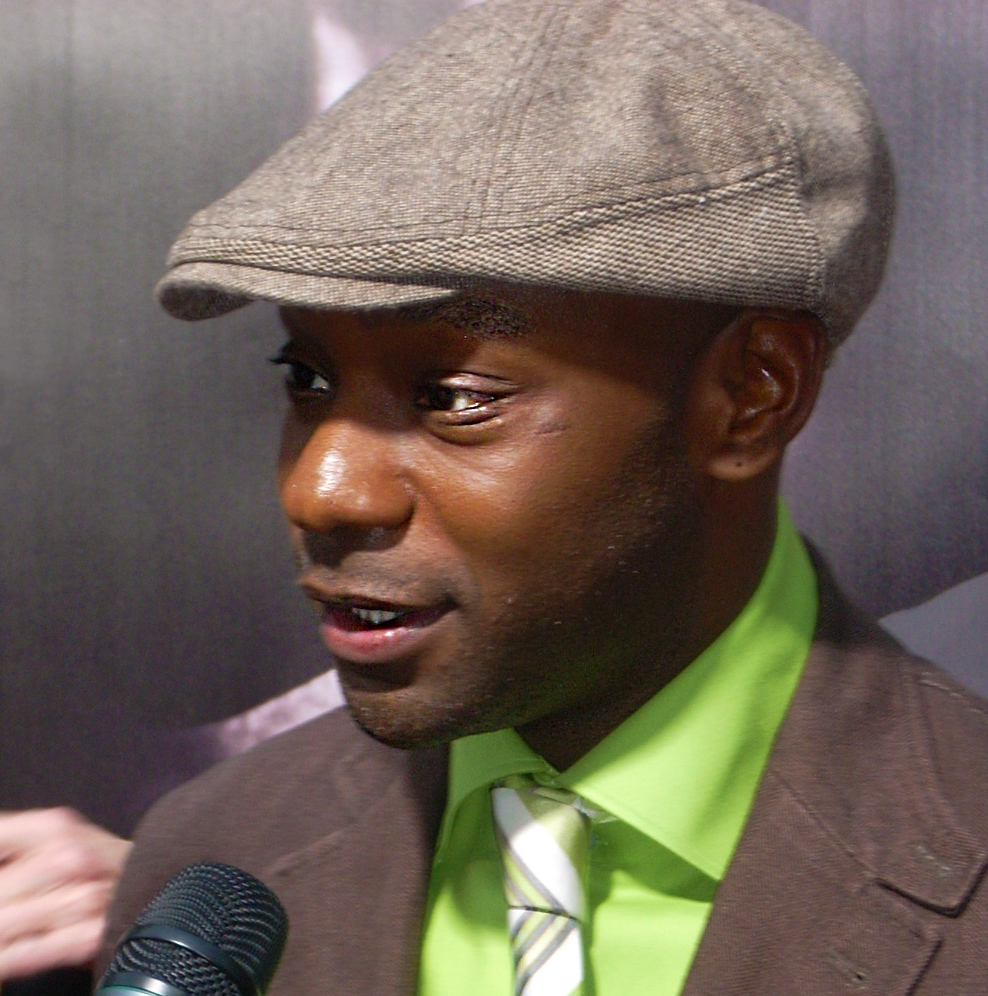
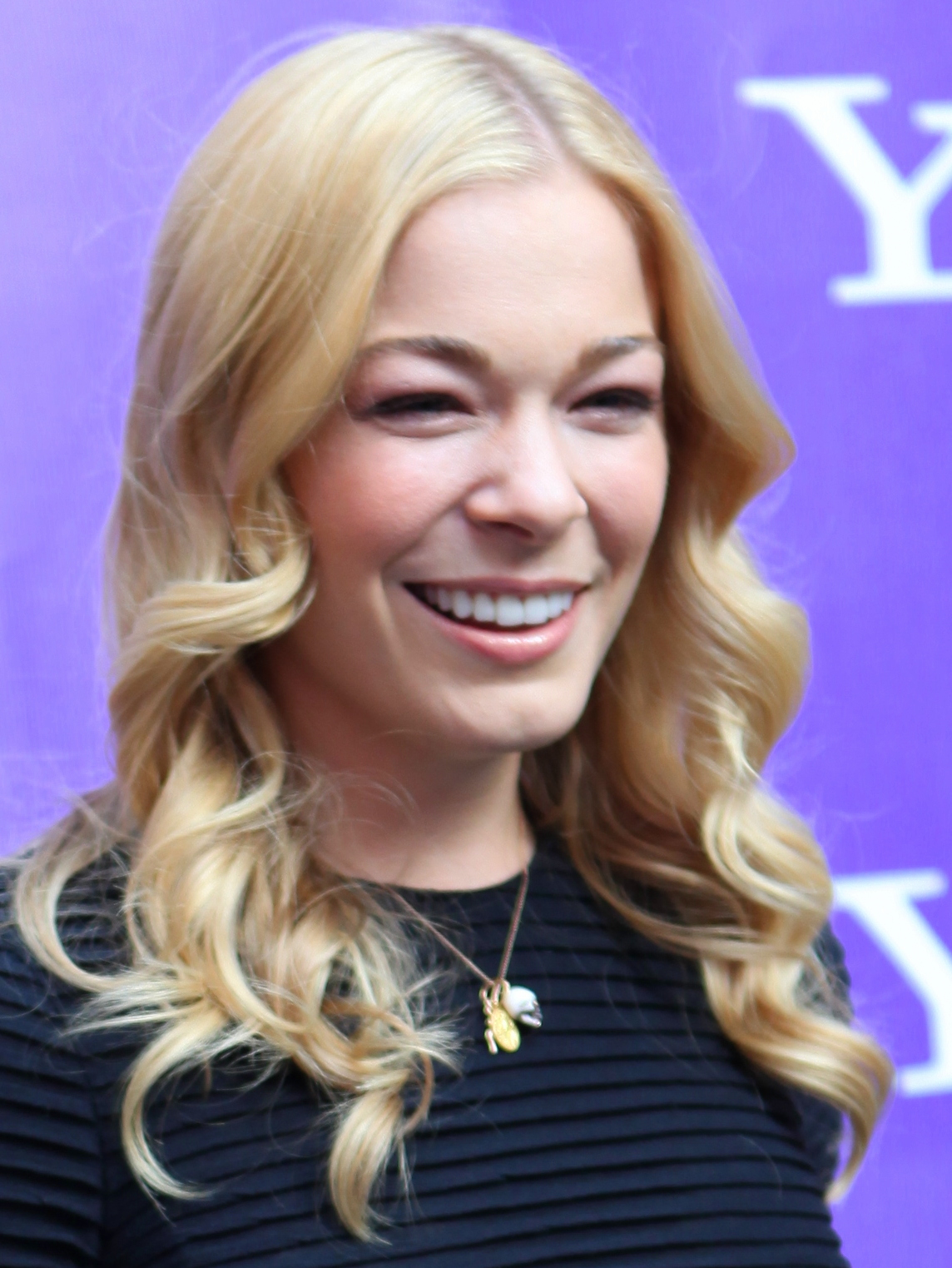
Nelsan Ellis (left) and LeAnn Rimes (right) are guest judges.

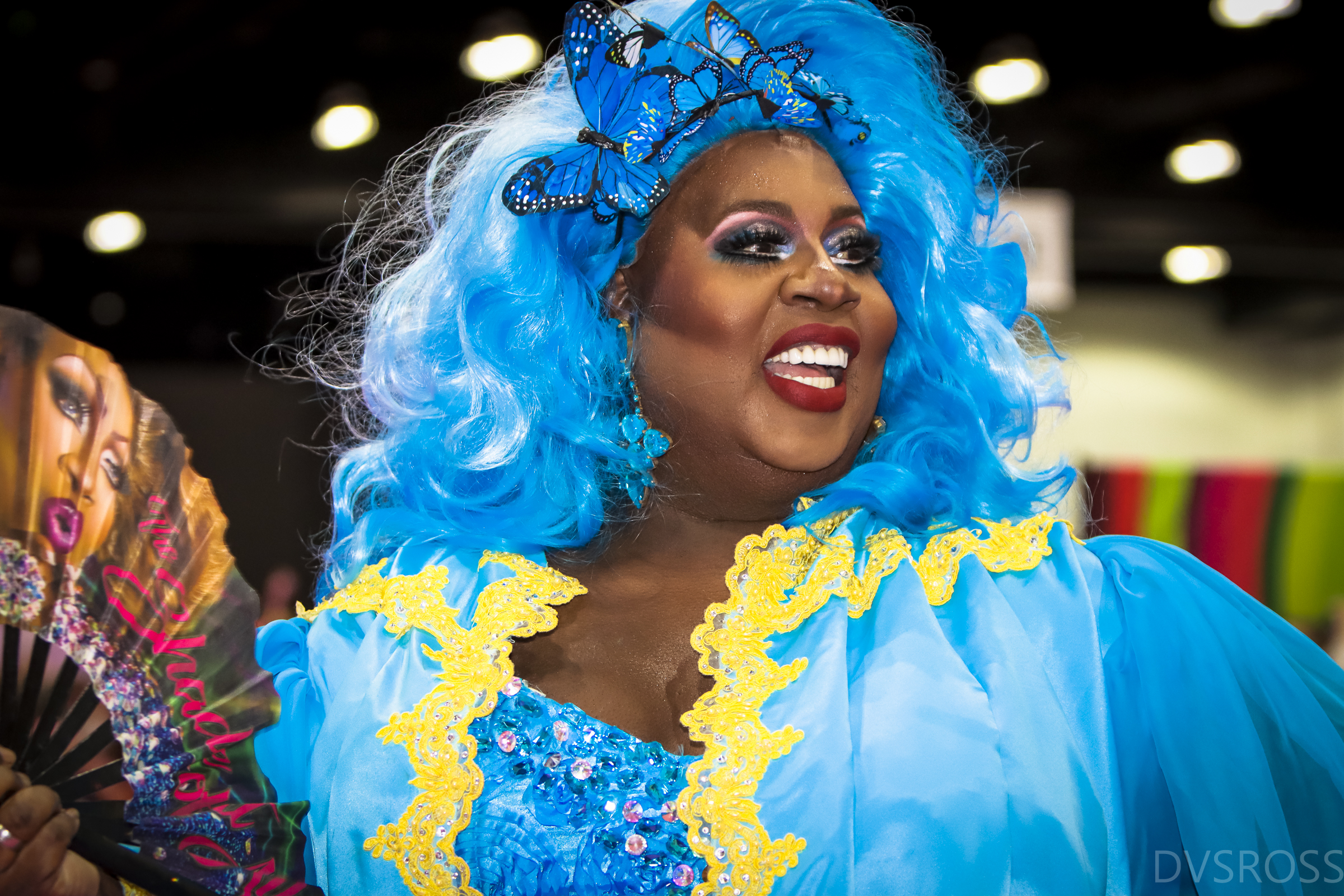
Former Drag Race contestant Latrice Royale (pictured at RuPaul's DragCon LA in 2022) makes a guest appearance.

The episode originally aired on April 20, 2015. During the lip-sync contest, Ginger Minj uses scissors to separate herself from Sasha Belle.

In an interview with The Advocate, when asked how it felt to re-enter the competition, Trixie Mattel said, "Thank God! Pearl and I created an amazing runway look together and delivered a fleshed-out, magical runway story. I couldn't wait to show more on the race!"

=== Fashion ===
For the main stage, RuPaul wears a green dress and a blonde wig. For the fashion show, Kandy Ho and Miss Fame are plastic surgery-inspired "surgical sisters". Jaidynn Diore Fierce and Tempest DuJour wear gold-and-green disco-inspired outfits. Jasmine Masters and Kennedy Davenport have matching purple dresses and long wigs with single flowers as accents. Pearl and Trixie Mattel are pageant contestants. Both wear crowns and Trixie Mattel wears dental braces. Max and Violet Chachki dress like can-can girls. Their dresses and black and red, and both wear blonde wigs and headpieces with feathers. Ginger Minj and Sasha Belle have pink outfits with animal print. They are conjoined at the breasts and have matching wigs. Katya and Mrs. Kasha Davis wear matching outfits with an animal print, as well as matching red wigs. They are conjoined at the vagina. Katya carries a cigarette and Mrs. Kasha Davis carries a drinking cup with a straw.

== Reception ==
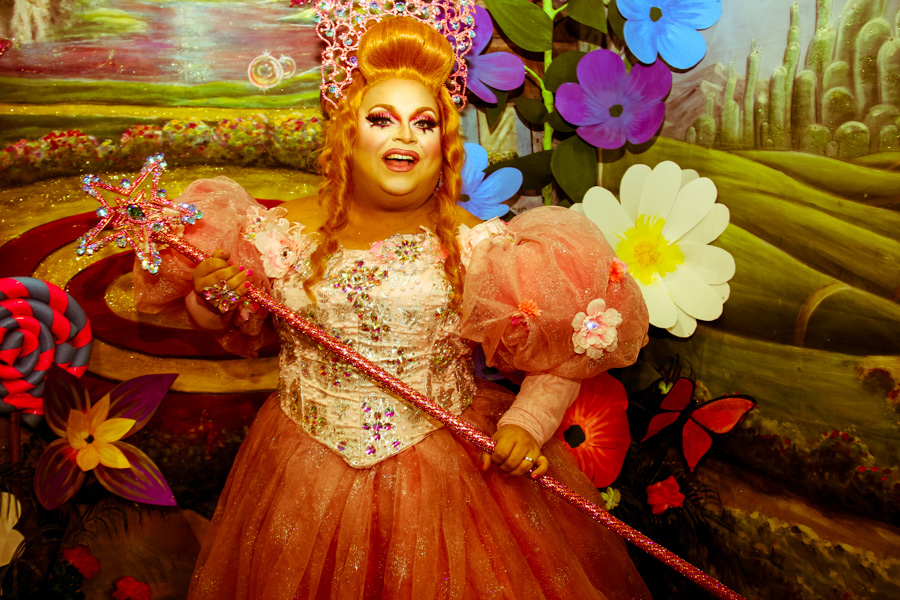
Ginger Minj (pictured at RuPaul's DragCon LA in 2018) uses scissors during the lip-sync contest.

Oliver Sava of The A.V. Club gave the episode a rating of 'A', calling it one of the season's best. Bernardo Sim included the runway challenge in Out magazine's list of fifteen "moments that prove ... season 7 was actually iconic". In 2021, Screen Rant included Pearl and Trixie Mattel in a list of the show's ten best makeover challenge transformations.

Kevin O'Keeffe ranked the "I Think We're Alone Now" performance number 80 in INTO Magazine's 2018 "definitive ranking" of the show's lip-sync contests to date. Stephen Daw ranked the contest fifteenth in Billboard's 2018 overview of the show's fifteen best lip-syncs to date. Daw said called the performance "a Drag Race first — the first on-stage mastectomy in the show’s history" and wrote: "The queens performing had conjoined twins to deal with, and while Jaidynn and Tempest worked out their song while attached back-to-front, Ginger and Sasha decided to free themselves when Minj pulled out a pair of scissors and cut off their conjoined breasts. This was a surefire win for Ginger, and one of the funniest and most entertaining lip syncs to watch." Jared Richards ranked the contest number 39 in Junkee's 2018 list of the 40 "most iconic" lip-syncs, saying it "might not be the most polished, but it’s certainly wild". Emma Kelly ranked the performance in Metro's 2018 list of the show's "best and most gag-worthy" lip-syncs to date. Sam Brooks ranked the contest number 30 in The Spinoff's 2019 "definitive ranking" of the show's 162 lip-syncs to date. Sim ranked the performance twelfth in Out's 2022 list of the show's best lip-sync contests with stunts. He said, "the execution of this stunt was a bit messy since it left Ginger barechested and wigless by the end of the lip sync, but it was still a very iconic moment in Drag Race herstory".
