= Jaidynn Diore Fierce =

American drag performer

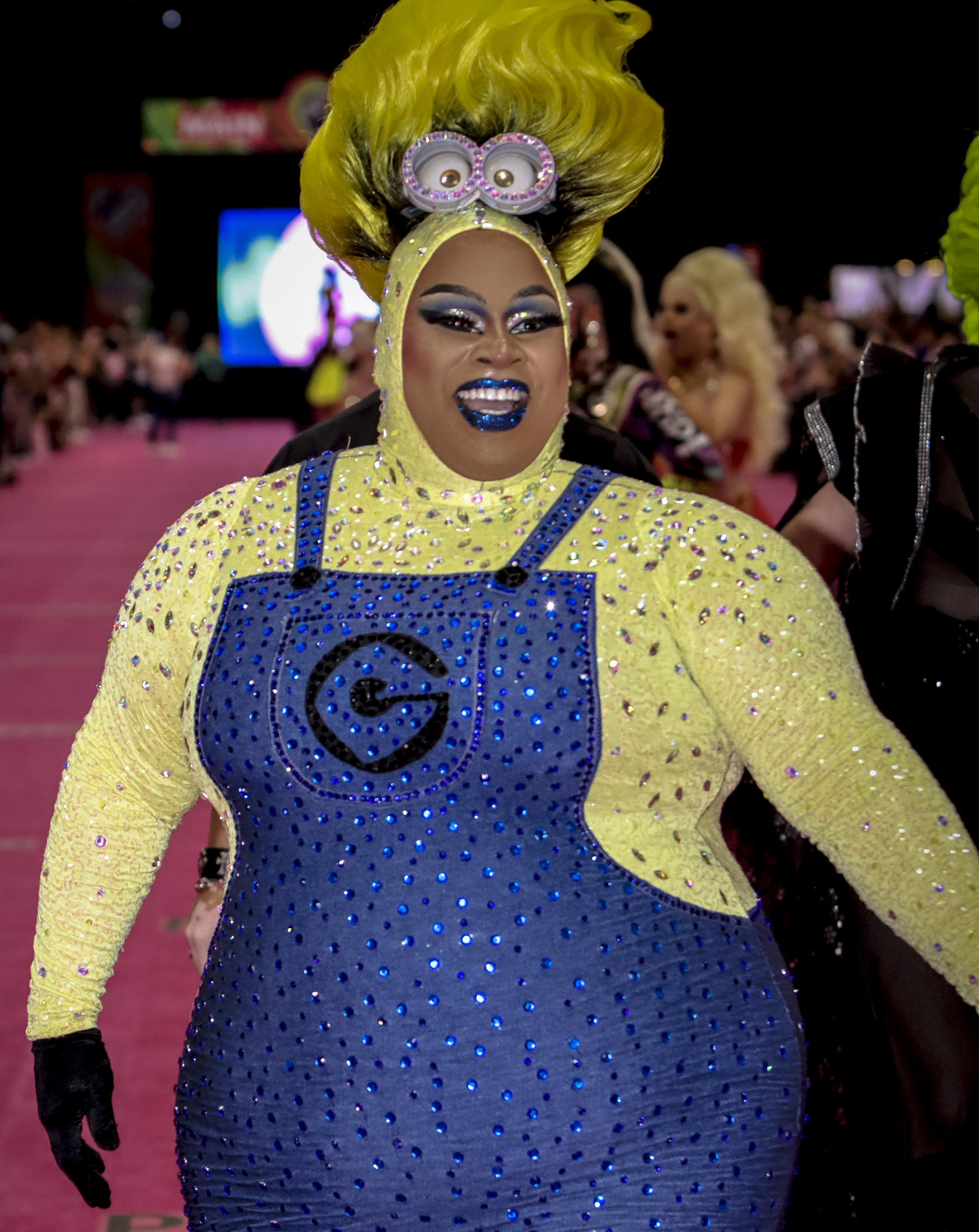
- Jaidynn Diore Fierce at RuPaul's DragCon LA in 2022
- Born: Christopher Williams; 1988 or 1989 (age 35–36); Tennessee, U.S.
- Occupation: Drag queen
- Television: RuPaul's Drag Race (season 7)

Jaidynn Diore Fierce is the stage name of Christopher Williams, an American drag performer who competed on season 7 of the American television series RuPaul's Drag Race. Williams, who is originally from Tennessee, lives and works in Nashville. He has spoken out against Tennessee's bill to ban public drag performance and gender-affirming care for transgender youth.

== Early life and education ==
Christopher Williams was born in the U.S. state of Tennessee and raised in a Christian household. He graduated from high school in Nashville and attended his first drag show at Play Dance Bar in 2007 on the night of his graduation.

== Career ==
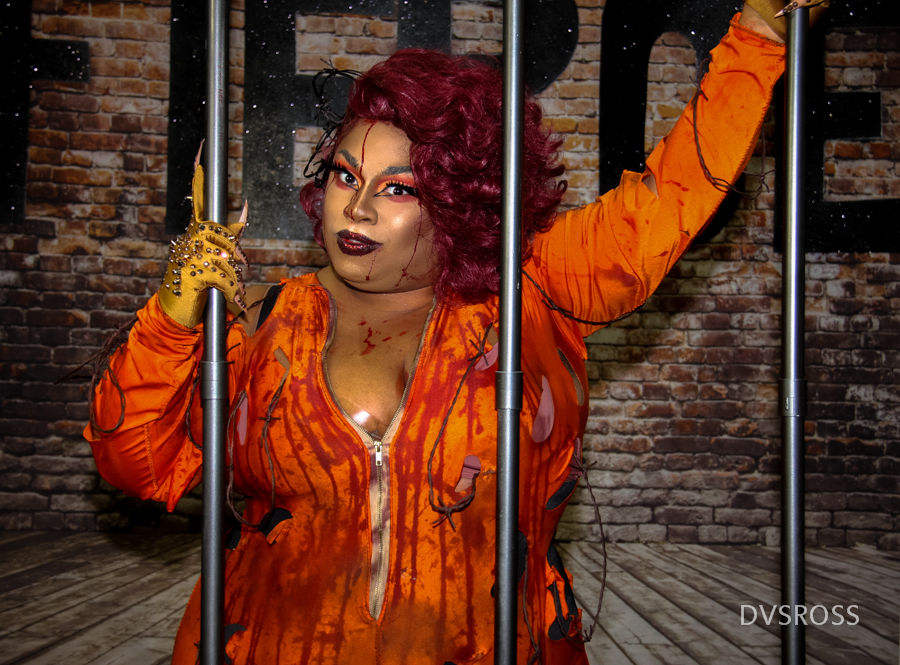
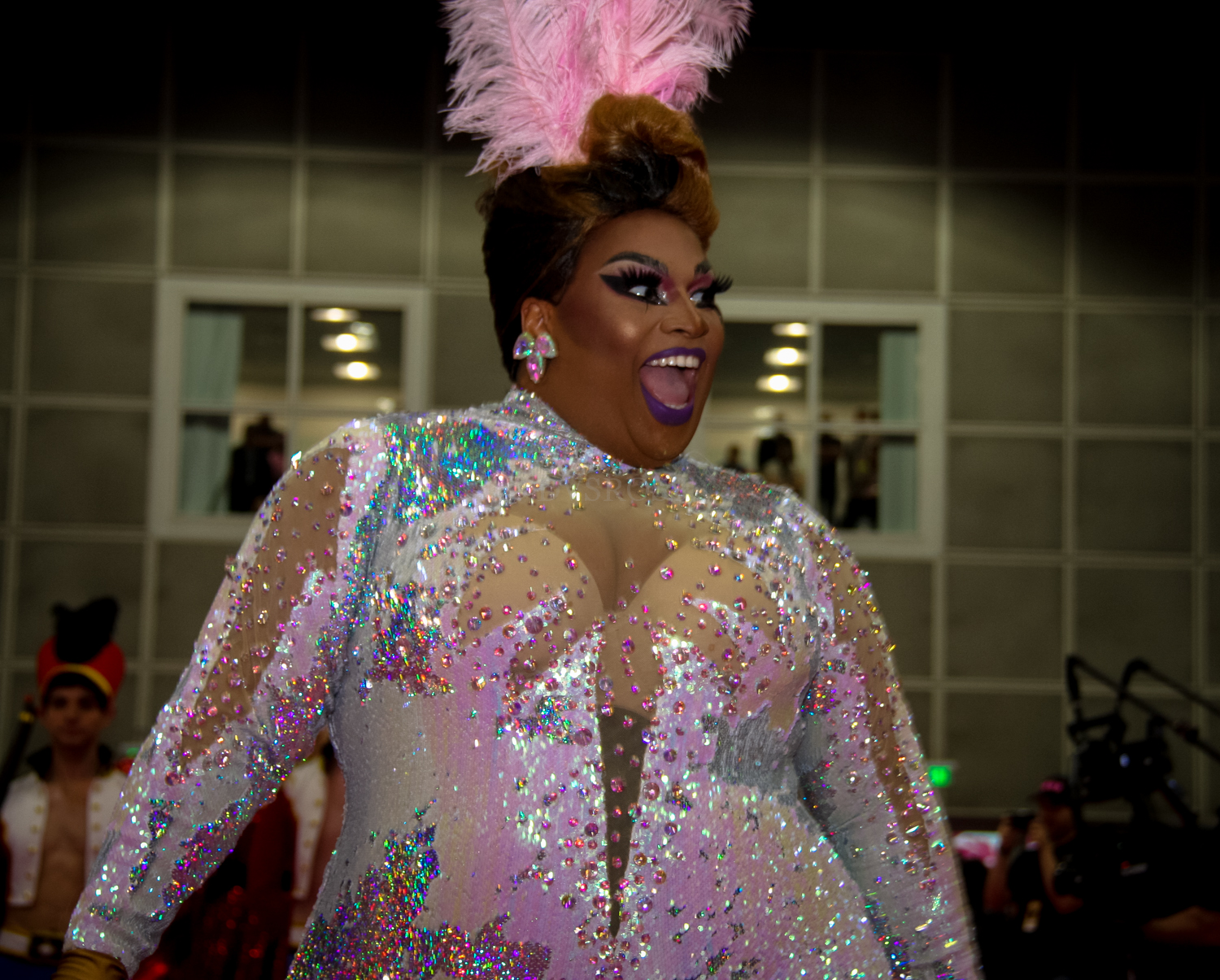
Jaidynn Diore Fierce at RuPaul's DragCon LA in 2018 (top) and 2019 (bottom)

Williams began his drag career in Nashville, competing in pageants for several years. He auditioned for RuPaul's Drag Race three times and was selected to compete as Jaidynn Diore Fierce in the show's seventh season (2015). On the show, she impersonated Raven-Symoné for the Snatch Game challenge. Jaidynn Diore Fierce was partnered with Tempest DuJour on the episode "Conjoined Queens", a pairing Pride.com deemed a "betrayal" on Kennedy Davenport's part. Jaidynn Diore Fierce eliminated two contestants from the competition and was placed eighth overall. She was eliminated by Ginger Minj.

Pride.com said Jaidynn Diore Fierce "was another great example of a queen who had everything it took to go all the way, but just wasn't ready yet to tackle all of the challenges that one must face on Drag Race". Michael Cook of Out In Jersey called her the "true heart" of the season and said she had an "infectious" personality. Ryan Shea included Jaidynn Diore Fierce in Instinct magazine's 2019 list of the ten best "plus size queens".

Jaidynn Diore Fierce recorded "The Beginning" for CoverGurlz 2, a 2015 compilation album featuring season-7 contestants performing covers of songs by RuPaul. In 2016, Jaidynn Diore Fierce was part of the rotating cast of Playmates at Nashville's Play Dance Bar. In 2017, she participated in a drag show to raise funds for Puerto Rico residents who were affected by Hurricane Maria, and the following year, she headlined the University of Wisconsin–Milwaukee's nineteenth annual drag show. As of 2022, she was part of the all-Black drag trio Missfits with her "drag sisters" Sapphire Mylan and Venus Ann Serena, who has also been described as Jaidynn Diore Fierce's "drag daughter". Also in 2022, Jaidynn Diore Fierce and fellow Drag Race contestant Mercedes Iman Diamond performed at the first drag brunch in Ely, Minnesota.

In 2023, Jaidynn Diore Fierce was part of a fundraiser to spotlight queer performers in country music and Americana, and to protest the passage of anti-LGBT legislation in Tennessee. She was also among a group of Drag Race contestants and other Tennessee-based drag artists who joined Lizzo on stage at one of her concerts as part of the singer's protest against the state's bill to ban public drag performance. Among other 2023 events in which Jaidynn Diore Fierce performed were a local Wizard of Oz-themed brunch and an LGBTQ+ pub quiz fundraiser in Orlando, Florida.

== Personal life ==
Christopher Williams lives in Nashville, as of 2015. He has struggled with his sexual identity, being both Christian and gay.

In addition to joining Lizzo on stage, Jaidynn Diore Fierce has spoken out against Tennessee's bill to ban public drag performance and gender-affirming care for trans youth. In 2023, John Oliver defended Fierce against Gabrielle Hanson, a Republican politician from Tennessee, on Oliver's television series Last Week Tonight.

== Discography ==
- "The Beginning" (2015)

== Filmography ==
=== Television ===
- RuPaul's Drag Race (season 7)

== See also ==
- List of people from Nashville, Tennessee
