= Max (drag queen) =

American drag performer

- Born: Max Malanaphy; Portsmouth, New Hampshire, U.S.
- Occupation: Drag queen
- Television: RuPaul's Drag Race (season 7)

Max Malanaphy, or simply Max, is an American drag performer who competed on the seventh season of RuPaul's Drag Race.

== Early life ==
Max was born in Portsmouth, New Hampshire. He grew up in Hudson, Wisconsin where his family moved when he was eight. He graduated from the University of Wisconsin-Milwaukee, where fellow season seven contestant Trixie Mattel also attended and knew him from working on musicals together. In 2013, he moved to Minneapolis, Minnesota.

== Career ==
Max competed on the seventh season of RuPaul's Drag Race. She impersonated Sharon Needles for the Snatch Game challenge, and placed ninth overall. Max starred in the web series Agent Max in 2017.

== Filmography ==
=== Television ===
- RuPaul's Drag Race (season 7)

=== Web series ===
- Agent Max
