= Born Naked (RuPaul's Drag Race) =

- RuPaul's Drag Race episode
- Episode no.: Season 7 Episode 1
- Directed by: Nick Murray
- Original air date: March 2, 2015

Guest appearances
- Alaska Thunderfuck; Mathu Andersen; Kathy Griffin

Episode chronology
← Previous "Reunited!"	Next → "Glamazonian Airways"

"Born Naked" is the first episode of the seventh season of RuPaul's Drag Race. Directed by Nick Murray, the episode originally aired on March 2, 2015. Kathy Griffin is a guest judge. For the fashion show mini-challenge, Mathu Andersen and former contestant Alaska Thunderfuck make guest appearances, the latter impersonating Anna Wintour.

Violet Chachki wins the episode's mini-challenge. Tempest DuJour is eliminated from the competition, after placing in the bottom two of a main challenge that has contestants design and wear resort looks that "tear away" to reveal an illusion of nudity, then losing a lip-sync against Kandy Ho to the song "Geronimo" by RuPaul.

== Episode ==
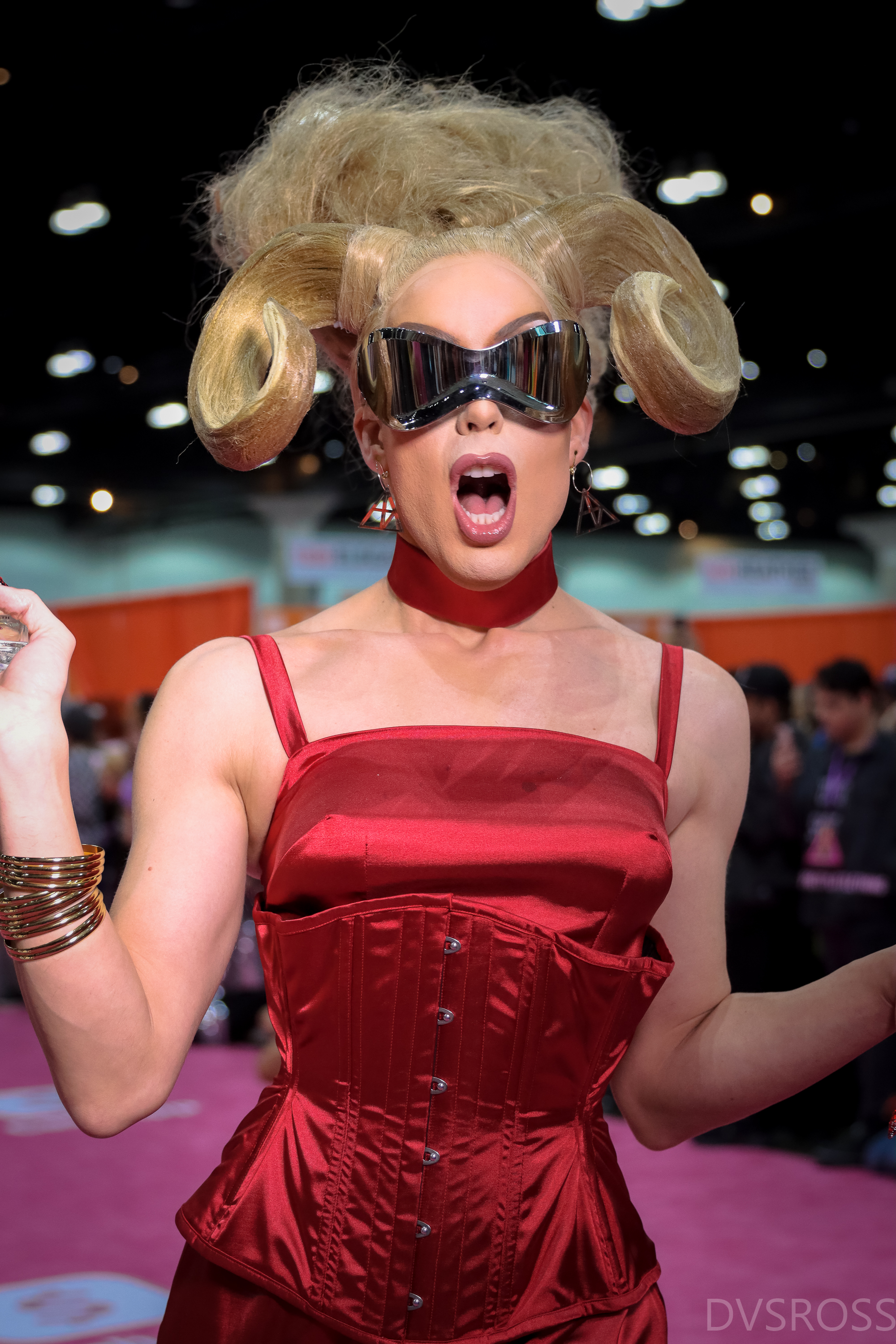
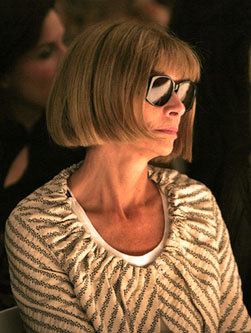
For the mini-challenge, former contestant Alaska Thunderfuck (left) impersonates Anna Wintour (right).
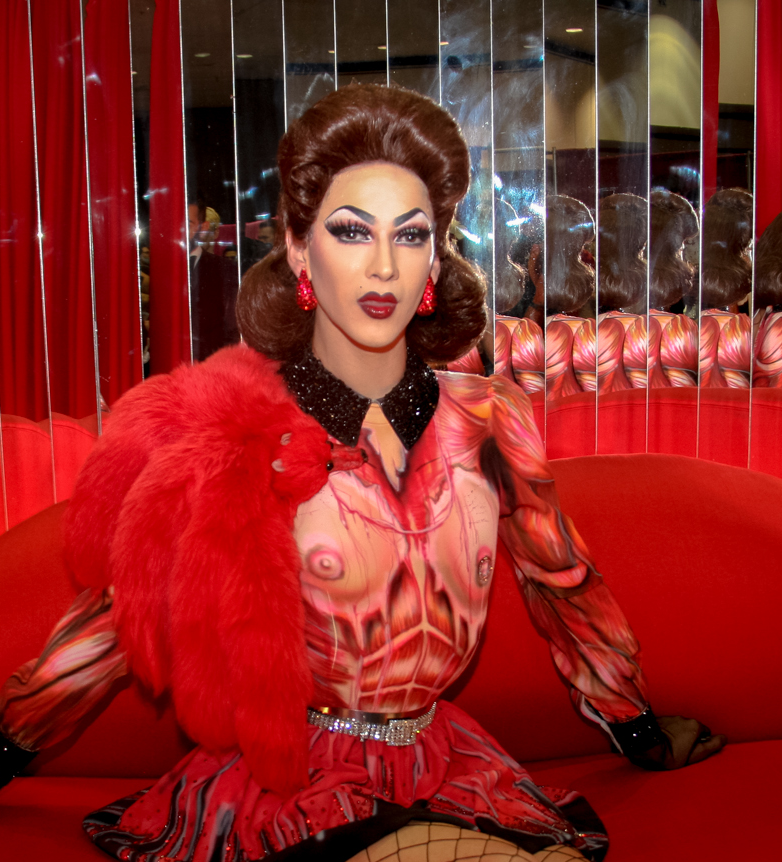
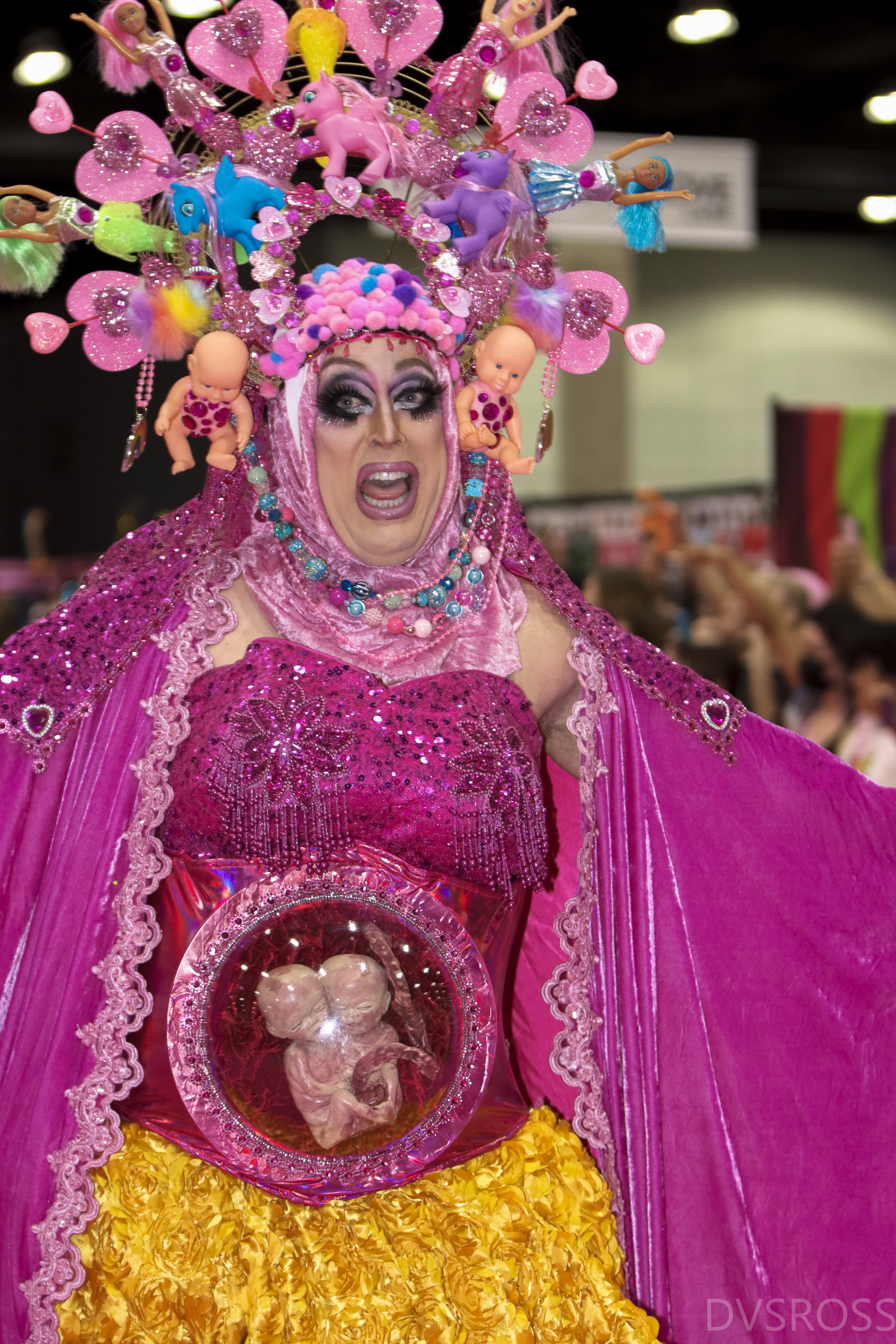
Violet Chachki (left, pictured at RuPaul's DragCon LA in 2017) won the episode's main challenge; Tempest DuJour (right, pictured at the 2022 event) was eliminated from the competition.

The contestants enter the Werk Room one at a time; in order of appearance: Miss Fame, Ginger Minj, Jaidynn Diore Fierce, Violet Chachki, Max, Katya, Jasmine Masters, Mrs. Kasha Davis, Trixie Mattel, Kandy Ho, Pearl, Kennedy Davenport, Sasha Belle, and Tempest DuJour. During her entrance, Tempest DuJour drops a plastic baby from between her legs. Kandy Ho asks Tempest DuJour about her age. RuPaul welcomes the contestants and introduces the season's first contest, a Fashion Week-inspired mini-challenge requiring contestants to model two looks (spring and fall) for a fashion show on a runway. In addition to RuPaul, the fashion show is attended by Michelle Visage, Carson Kressley, Alaska Thunderfuck impersonating Anna Wintour, and Mathu Andersen.

After the fashion show, the contestants return to the Werk Room to get out of drag. RuPaul welcomes members of the Pit Crew and reveals to contestants the main challenge: to design and wear resort looks that "tear away" to reveal an illusion of nudity. RuPaul later visits the contestants again in the Werk Room as they prepare for the main stage. Trixie Mattel shares that her boyfriend's parents do not approve of her doing drag.

On the main stage, RuPaul welcomes fellow judges Visage, Kressley, and Ross Mathews, as well as guest judge Kathy Griffin. The judges ask the contestants deemed safe to leave the main stage, then speak with the top and bottom contestants. Tempest DuJour mentions her weight loss. RuPaul asks the contestants to say who among their fellow contestants has impressed them the least. Kandy Ho and Tempest DuJour discuss age again. After the judges deliberate, Violet Chachki is declared the winner of the main challenge. Sasha Belle and Jasmine Masters are deemed safe. Kandy Ho and Tempest DuJour place in the bottom two and face off in a lip-sync contest to "Geronimo" by RuPaul (from the 2014 studio album Born Naked). Kandy Ho wins the lip-sync and Tempest DuJour is eliminated from the competition. Tempest DuJour leaves the main stage and returns to the Werk Room to write a message on the mirror to her fellow contestants.

== Production ==
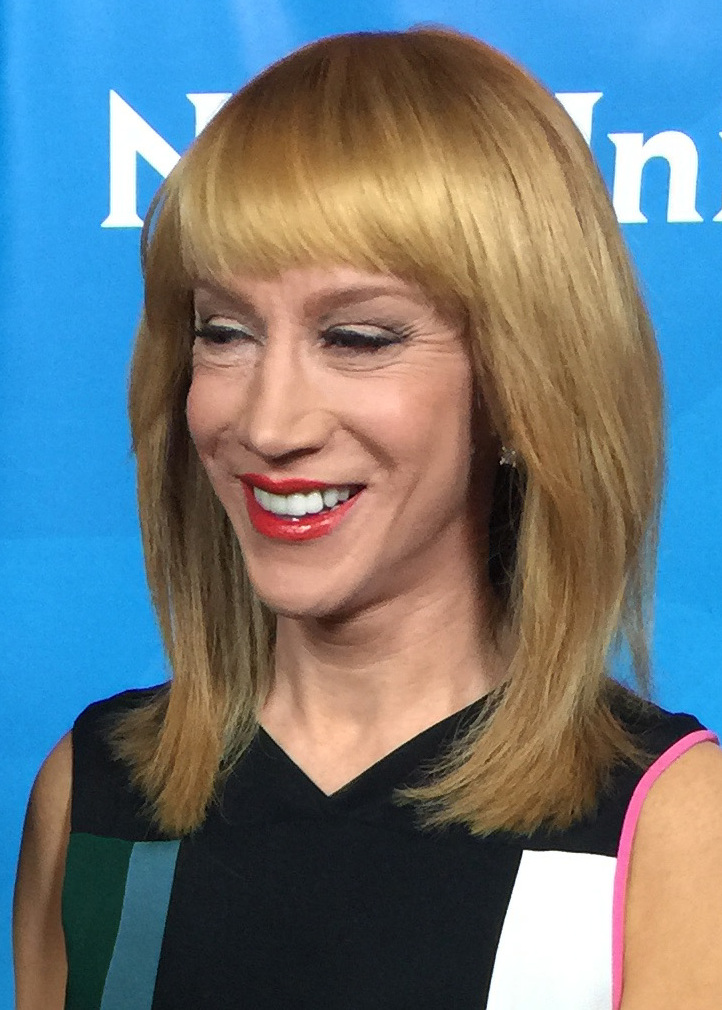
Kathy Griffin (pictured in 2015) is a guest judge on the episode.

The episode was directed by Nick Murray and originally aired on March 2, 2015. Its title, along with the season's twelfth episode "And the Rest Is Drag", refer to lyrics and phrasing ("we're all born naked, and the rest is drag") used prominently by RuPaul. The title track on RuPaul's album Born Naked explores this idea. Contestants perform the song on "And the Rest Is Drag", which has the season's last main challenge. "Born Naked" marked the end of the "She-Mail" moniker.

Alaska Thunderfuck had previously competed on the fifth season of Drag Race and was the winner of the second season of RuPaul's Drag Race All Stars. Andersen and RuPaul collaborated for many years, until the show's ninth season; Andersen initially did RuPaul's hair and make-up, and later directed challenges and became a creative producer of Drag Race. He was a guest judge on season two's "Here Comes the Bride" (2010), and he was a special guest on the fourth season's "The Final Three" (2012), the fifth season's "The Final Three, Hunty" (2013), the sixth season's "Sissy That Walk" (2014). Andersen was nominated in the Outstanding Makeup for a Variety, Nonfiction or Reality Program category at the 67th Primetime Emmy Awards for his work on the seventh season's third episode ("ShakesQueer"), and he also directed the series of sketches on "And the Rest Is Drag". Griffin later made a guest appearance on the fifth episode of Drag Race's seventh season, called "The DESPY Awards", to coach the contestants for the main challenge.

=== Fashion ===
For the mini-challenge, Violet Chachki's fall look is a reversible tartan cape.

For the main stage fashion show, Katya presents a red outfit, then bends over to reveal her buttocks. Miss Fame wears a poncho, and Tempest DuJour's outfit is attached with fake crabs. Max uses crutches, and Ginger Minj wears a yellow outfit. According to Entertainment Weekly, Jasmine Masters "emerges from a cocoon made of a tacky shower curtain and a hula hoop". Kandy Ho says her look is inspired by Greek goddesses. Violet Chachki gets nearly naked.

== Reception ==
Oliver Sava of The A.V. Club gave the episode a rating of 'B' and said: "'Born Naked' ... puts the emphasis on looks over personality, and while the outrageous style is certainly one of the most attractive things about this show, it's the biting wit and catty drama that makes Drag Race such a delight." He opined, "Even though this premiere doesn't offer the most taxing challenges for this year's contestants, it's still an immensely entertaining season opener, with a diverse group of contestants that reveals how this show is motivating drag queens around the country to up their game for a taste of national fame." The Guardian's Dominic Rushe said the episode's theme was "age versus beauty" based on Kandy Ho asking Tempest DuJour her age and Griffin accusing Kandy Ho of ageism. Kate Libby of City Magazine said of the runway looks: "Some nipples were askew, some black bras were showing, but for the most part, the ladies brought it."

The Advocate said the episode was " one of the most fashionable yet". Kevin O'Keeffe included the "Geronimo" performance at number 73 in Into magazine's 2018 "definitive ranking" of all lip-syncs on the show to date, writing: "The season 7 opener has its moments, from Kandy Ho's butt bumping to Tempest DuJour's bizarre 'squiggly arms,' as Jaidynn Diore Fierce put it. But mostly, it's a train wreck." Sam Brooks included "Geronimo" at number 152 in The Spinoff's similar 2019 "definitive ranking" of all 162 lip-sync contests on the show to date. Brooks said, "Not even RuPaul, the undisputed superstar of drag, could give his lip-syncs a great showcase, so it's a bit of an ask to ask two filler queens to do it." In 2022, the episode tied for a ranking of 9–11, with a score of 7.7, in Pride.com's ranking of the show's premiere episodes to date, according to IMDb.
