= Born Naked (disambiguation) =

Born Naked is an album by RuPaul 2014

Born Naked may also refer to

- "Born Naked", spoken word track by actor Tim Robbins on Woodie Guthrie album 'Til We Outnumber 'Em... The Songs of Woodie Guthrie 2000
- "Born Naked", song by RuPaul from Born Naked 2014
- "Born Naked", single by Triston Palma 1995
- "Born Naked", book by Farley Mowat 1993
- "Born Naked" (RuPaul's Drag Race)
