= ShakesQueer =

- RuPaul's Drag Race episode
- Episode no.: Season 7 Episode 3
- Original air date: March 16, 2015

Guest appearances
- Kat Dennings; Mel B

Episode chronology
← Previous "Glamazonian Airways"	Next → "Spoof! (There It Is)"

"ShakesQueer" is the third episode of the seventh season of the American television series RuPaul's Drag Race. It originally aired on March 16, 2015. The episode's main challenge tasks contestants with performing in Shakespeare-inspired plays. Kat Dennings and Mel B are guest judges. The episode sees Jasmine Masters eliminated from the competition after placing in the bottom two and losing a lip-sync contest against Kennedy Davenport to "I Was Gonna Cancel" by Kylie Minogue. It earned Mathu Andersen a Primetime Emmy Award nomination for Outstanding Makeup for a Variety, Nonfiction or Reality Program.

== Episode ==
The contestants return to the Werk Room after Sasha Belle's elimination. On a new day, RuPaul greets the group and reveals the mini-challenge, which tasks contestants with "sissy that walker" performing in a Soul Train-inspired dance line, wearing Golden Girls-inspired attire. Kennedy Davenport and Max are deemed the winners, and therefore become team captains for the main challenge and get to assign the roles. Max selects Ginger Minj, Jaidynn Diore Fierce, Miss Fame, Mrs. Kasha Davis, and Trixie Mattel. Kennedy Davenport selects Jasmine Masters, Kandy Ho, Katya, Pearl, and Violet Chachki. The captains assign roles.

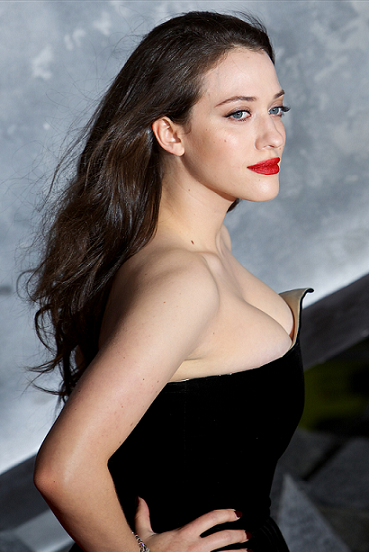
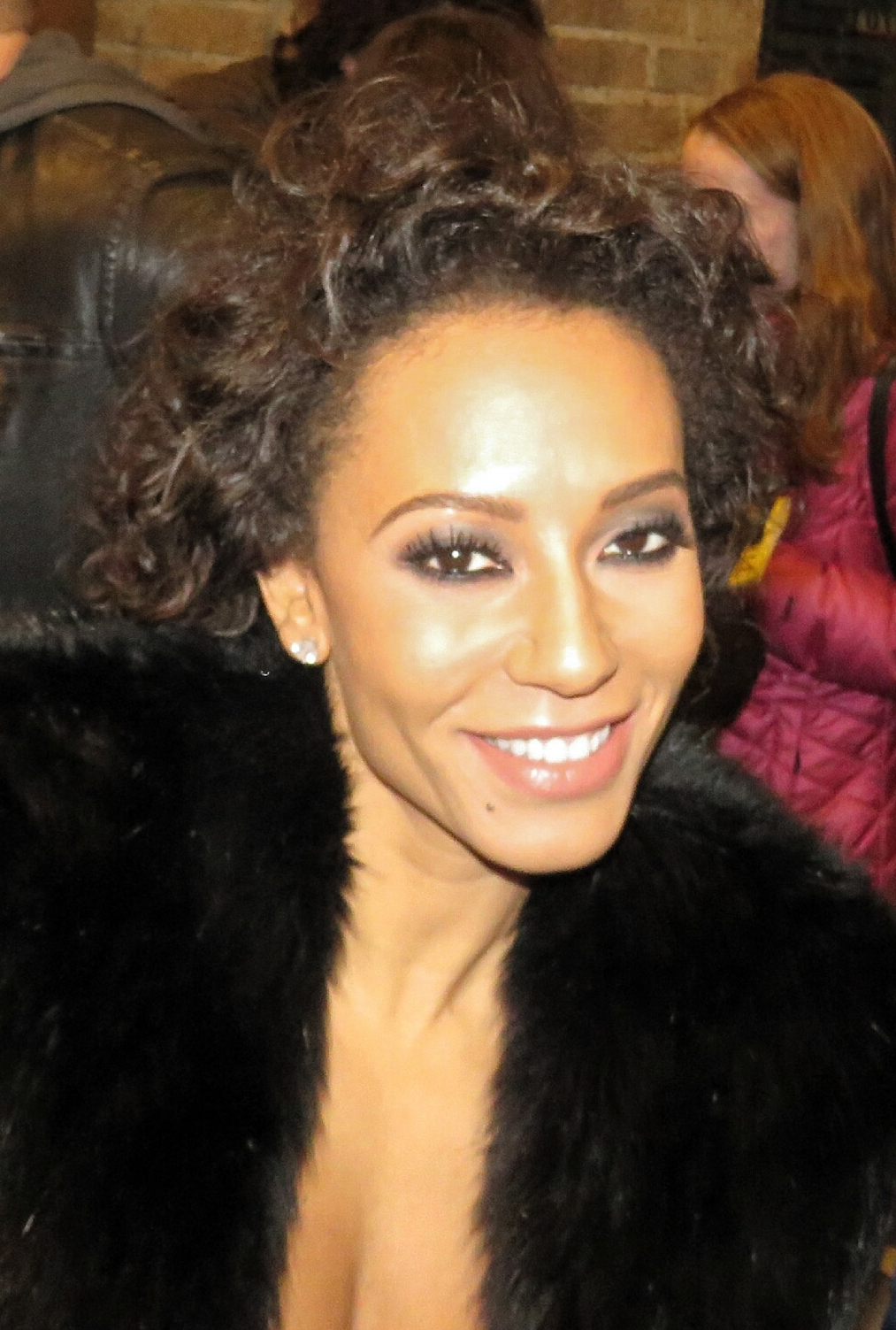
Kat Dennings (left, pictured in 2013) and Mel B (right, pictured in 2016) are guest judges.

For the main challenge, two teams must act in Shakespeare-inspired plays: MacBitch and Romy and Juliet. The Guardian described Romy and Juliet as a "lesbian-themed anti-teen suicide parable". In the main stage area, both teams struggle while rehearsing with RuPaul and Michelle Visage. Jaidynn Diore Fierce lacks self-confidence and Jasmine Masters has difficulty with her lines. RuPaul gets upset at the contestants, and says Kennedy Davenport's team is "the biggest trainwreck [she had] seen in seven seasons". Back in the Werk Room, the contestants prepare for the fashion show. Some of the contestants discuss the purpose of drag and its value to the community.

On the main stage, RuPaul welcomes fellow judges Visage and Carson Kressley, as well as guest judges Kat Dennings are Mel B. RuPaul also reveals the runway category: "Bearded and Beautiful". The contestants present their looks on the runway, then the judges and contestants watch the performances of both plays. The judges deliver their critiques. Max's team is deemed safe. Max is declared the winner of the main challenge, earning her a prize of two latex outfits. RuPaul gets upset at the losing group for not being more prepared. The judges deliberate while the contestant wait backstage, then share the results with the group. RuPaul confronts Pearl in front of the others, accusing her of "sleepwalking" and needing to "wake up". Jasmine Masters and Kennedy Davenport place in the bottom two and face off in a lip-sync contest to "I Was Gonna Cancel" (2014) by Kylie Minogue. Kennedy Davenport wins the lip-sync and Jasmine Masters is eliminated from the competition.

== Production ==
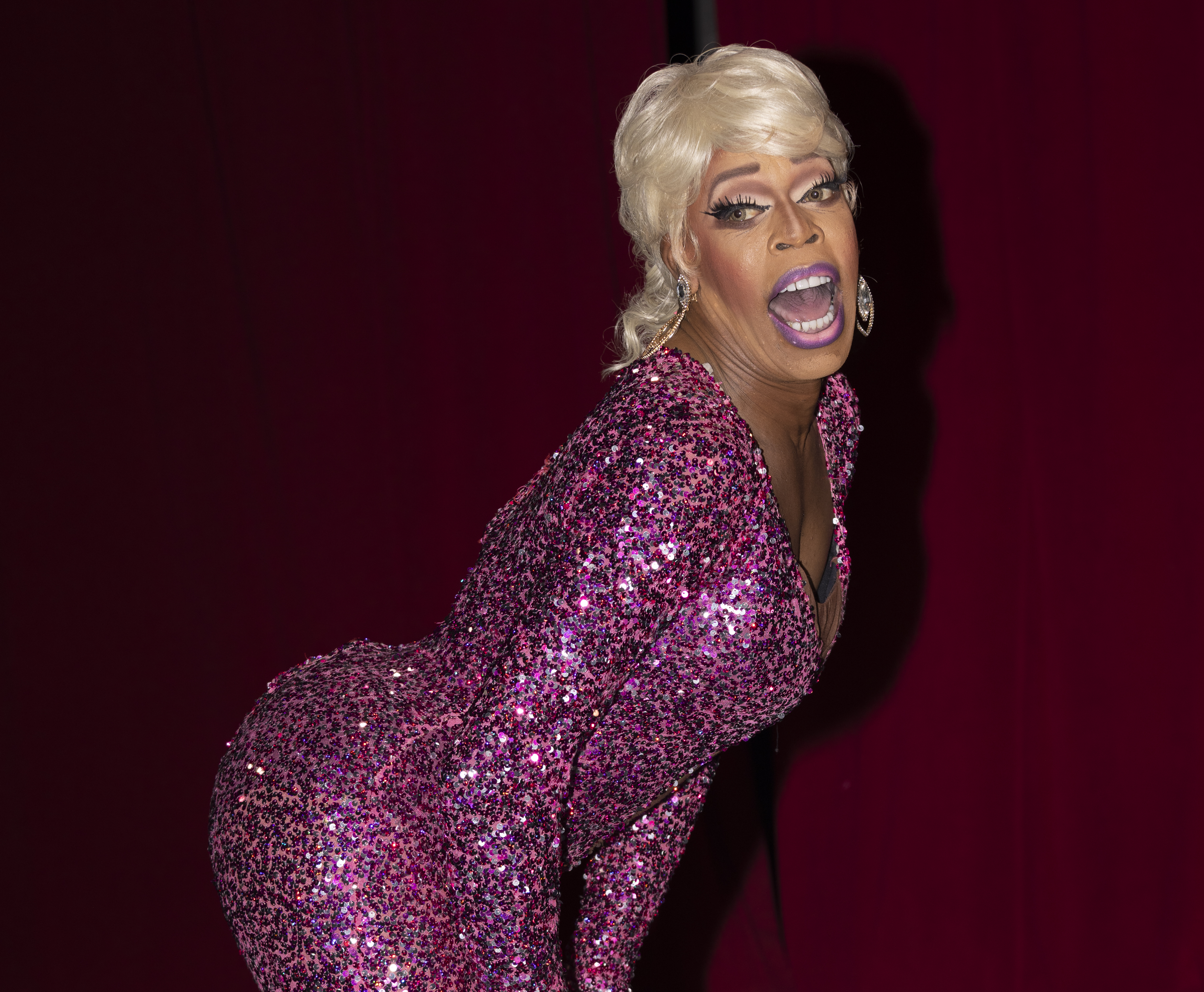
Jasmine Masters (pictured in 2025) is eliminated from the competition.

The episode originally aired on March 16, 2015. Todd Masterson was the challenge producer. Mathu Andersen and RuPaul collaborated for many years, until the show's ninth season; Andersen initially did RuPaul's hair and make-up, and later directed challenges and became a creative producer of Drag Race. He was a guest judge on season two's "Here Comes the Bride" (2010), and he was a special guest on the fourth season's "The Final Three" (2012), the fifth season's "The Final Three, Hunty" (2013), the sixth season's "Sissy That Walk" (2014), and the seventh season's premiere episode "Born Naked". He directed the sketches for the season's final challenge in the twelfth episode "And the Rest Is Drag".

During the main challenge, contestant Jaidynn Diore Fierce comments on her lack of theatre experience. Ginger Minj has said RuPaul's main stage "rant" was over an hour long.

=== Fashion ===
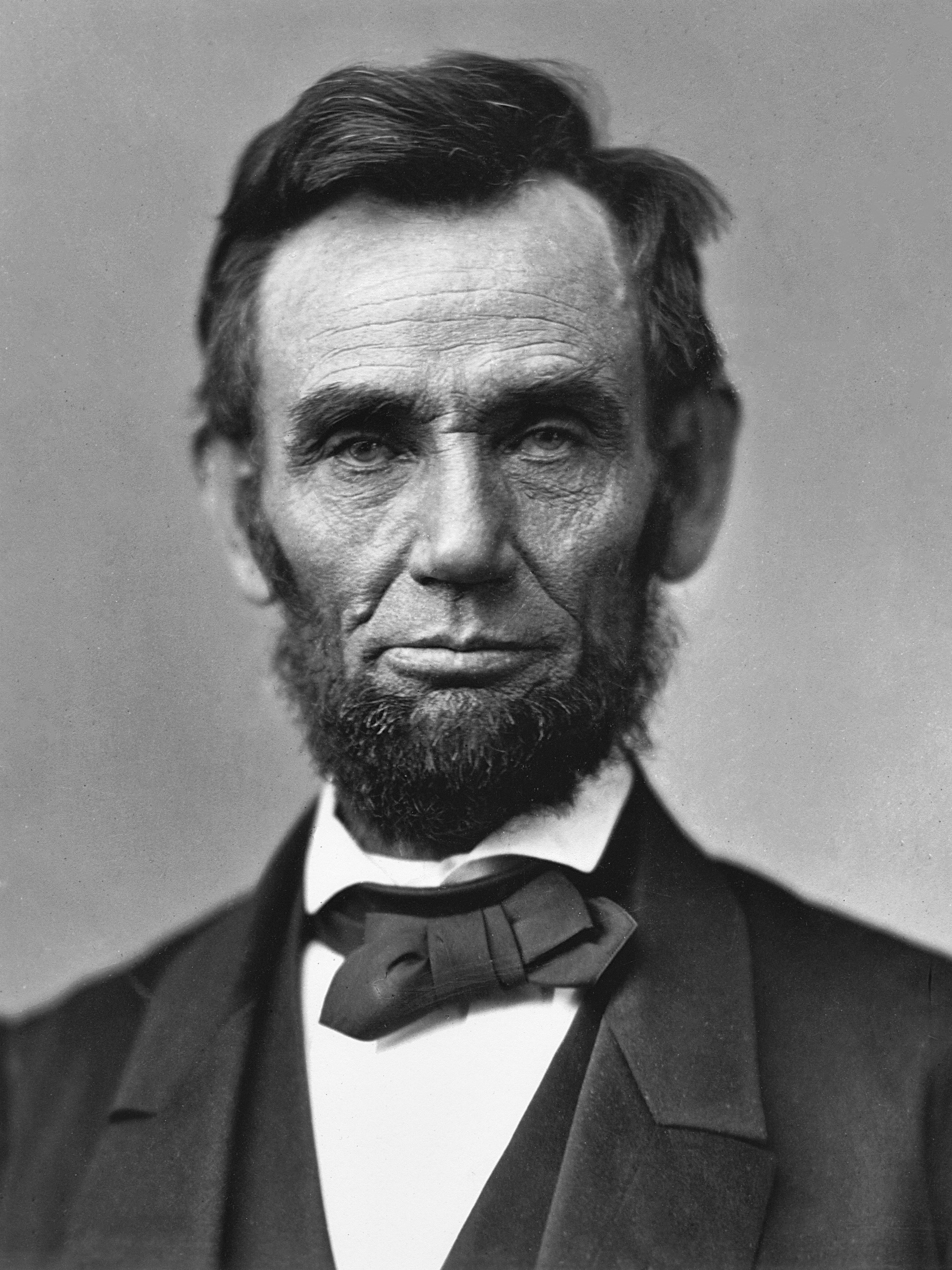
For the fashion show, Katya presents a look inspired by Abraham Lincoln (pictured).

For the fashion show, Max wears a black outfit and carries a small sword. Ginger Minj has a pink floral dress. Trixie Mattel wears wings. Mrs. Kasha Davis has a black gown and a black-and-white wig. Jaidynn Diore Fierce has gold necklaces red hair. Miss Fame wears a red harlequin-inspired outfit. Her hair is red. Kennedy Davenport's purple gown has sequins. Katya's suit-inspired look is inspired by Abraham Lincoln. She has a black top hat. Jasmine Masters wears a black-and-white gown. Pearl has a black-and-red outfit and a blonde wig. Kandy Ho's dress is black. She has a square-shaped wig. Violet Chachki's dress is pink.

== Reception and recognition ==
Allison Shoemaker of The A.V. Club gave the episode a rating of 'B'. Eran Sabaner of The Tufts Daily wrote, "Jasmine Masters was notoriously eliminated for her lackluster performance in the season seven 'ShakesQueer' challenge, where she had the worst comedic timing in the show's herstory." Sam Brooks ranked "I Was Gonna Cancel" number 126 on The Spinoff's 2019 "definitive ranking" of all 162 lip-sync contests on the show to date. Joey Nolfi of Entertainment Weekly said the lip-sync contest to "I Was Gonna Cancel" was "memorable" in 2021. Moon Abbott included the main challenge in Screen Rant's 2021 overview of ten times RuPaul "got angry" at the contestants on the show.

Bernardo Sim of Pride.com included the performance of MacBitch in a 2023 list of ten "legendary fails" on the show "that actually became iconic". Writing for Out in 2023, Sim said: "Absolutely nothing good came out of the third episode... Well, except for one iconic GIF that gets used all the time by fans – and even non-fans – of the show: Max delivering the line 'Status update: dead' while every other queen in the cast bombed the acting challenge."

The episode earned Andersen a Primetime Emmy Award nomination for Outstanding Makeup for a Variety, Nonfiction or Reality Program.
