= Sissy That Walk (RuPaul's Drag Race) =

- RuPaul's Drag Race episode
- Episode no.: Season 6 Episode 12
- Presented by: RuPaul
- Original air date: May 5, 2014

Guest appearances
- Mathu Andersen; Jamal Sims

Episode chronology
| ← Previous "Glitter Ball" | Next → "Countdown to the Crown" |
- RuPaul's Drag Race season 6

"Sissy That Walk" is the twelfth episode of the sixth season of the American television series RuPaul's Drag Race. It originally aired on May 5, 2014. The episode's main challenge tasks the contestants with performing choreography in the official music video for RuPaul's song "Sissy That Walk", as well as acting in two sketches directed by Australian artist Mathu Andersen, who is also a guest judge. Choreographer Jamal Sims also makes a guest appearance. Darienne Lake is eliminated from the competition.

== Episode ==
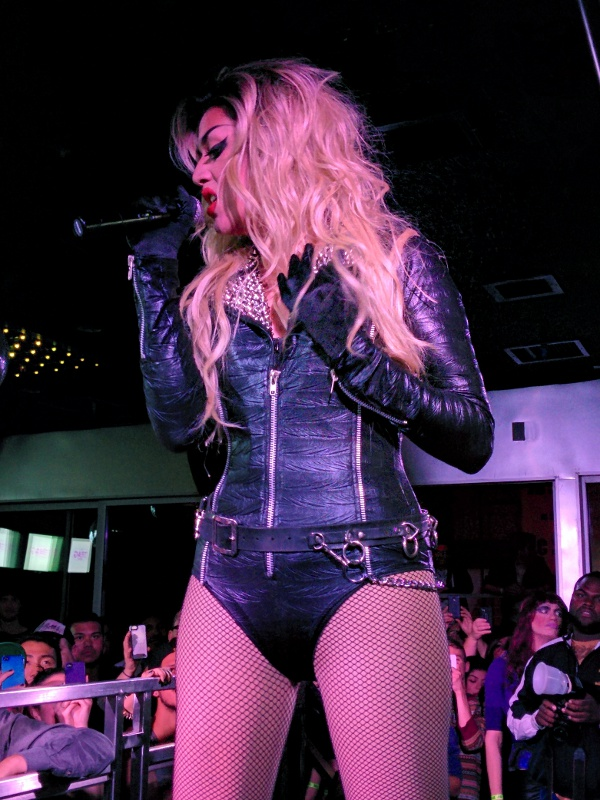
Adore Delano

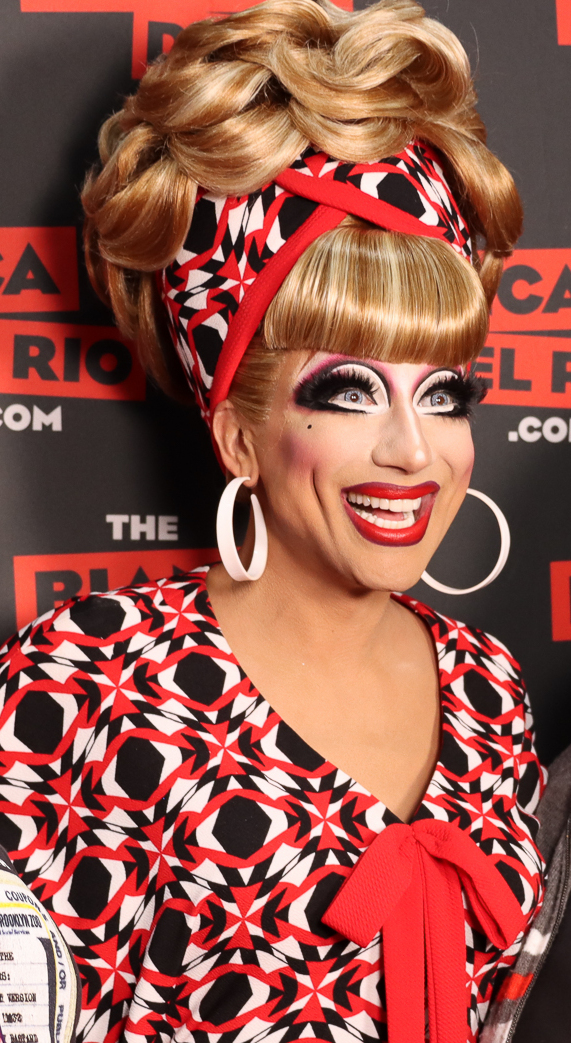
Bianca Del Rio

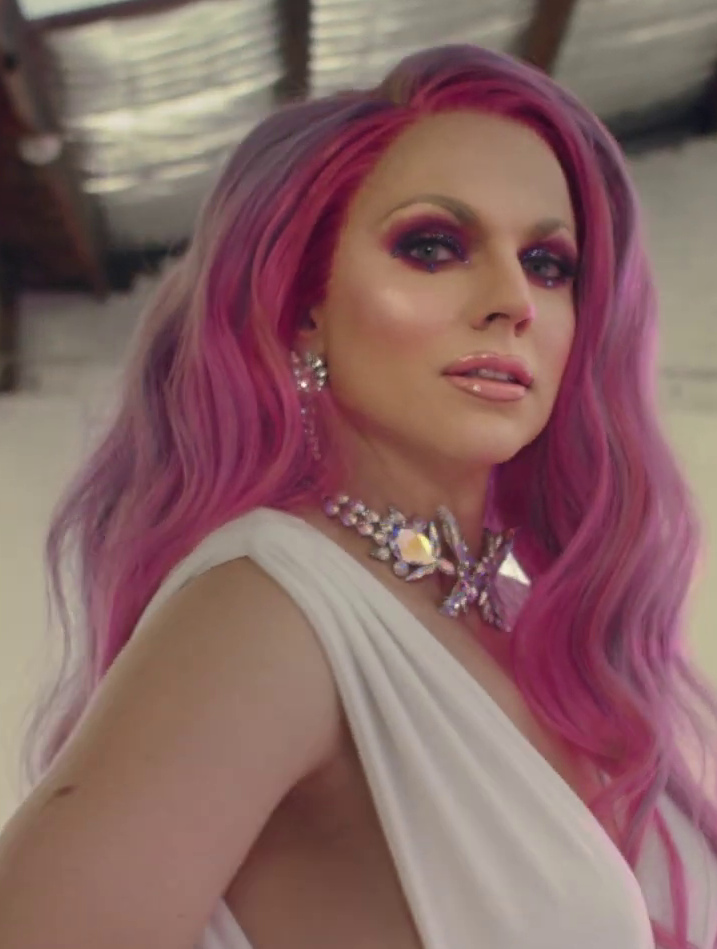
Courtney Act

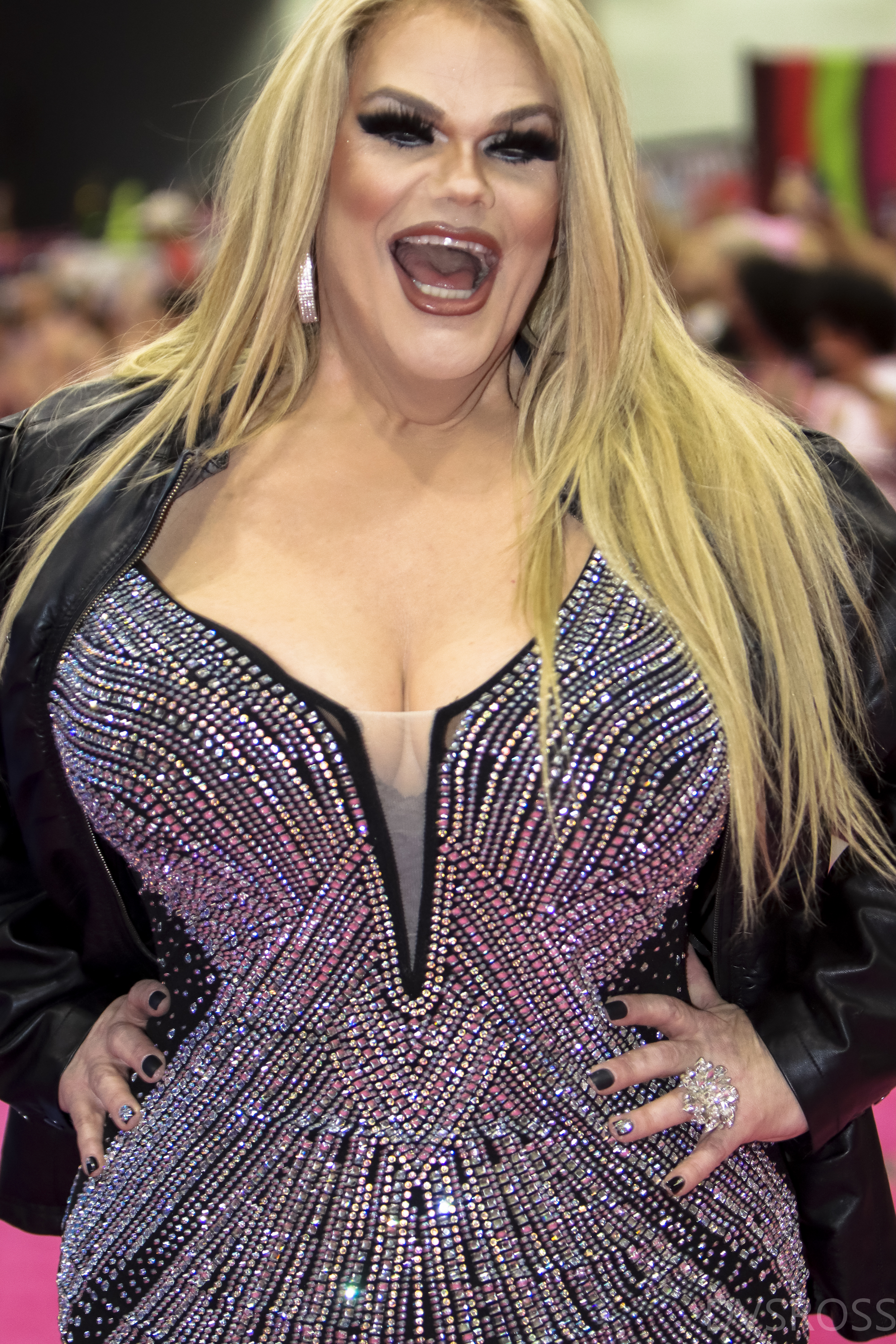
Darienne Lake

The four finalists who compete in the last challenge of the sixth season.

The remaining four contestants—Adore Delano, Bianca Del Rio, Courtney Act, and Darienne Lake—return to the Werk Room after BenDeLaCreme's elimination on the previous episode. Michelle Visage greets the group and reveals the final challenge, which tasks the contestants with performing choreography in the official music video of RuPaul's song "Sissy That Walk", as well as acting in two sketches directed by Mathu Andersen.

Guest choreographer Jamal Sims coaches the contestants in the Werk Room. During her interview with RuPaul, Courtney Act discusses her qualifications and her approach for winning the competition. Darienne Lake describes the challenges of coming out and self-acceptance. Bianca Del Rio talks about mentorship, and Adore Delano describes her relationships with her father and mother.

The contestants film their contributions for the music video in front of a green screen, with assistance from Sims and members of the Pit Crew. For the acting part of the challenge, RuPaul joins the contestants to film two sketches with Andersen. For the first scene, RuPaul plays a photographer making unusual requests. The contestants each play a character called Sissy for the second sketch, opposite RuPaul as Charles. Back in the Werk Room, the contestants prepare for the fashion show and share their first impressions of each other.

On the main stage, RuPaul welcomes fellow judges Visage and Santino Rice. The runway category is "Best Drag". After the fashion show, the judges deliver their critiques and RuPaul asks each contestant to share why they should be crowned the winner. The contestants leave the main stage and the judges deliberate. Upon their return, RuPaul tells the contestants that all four will be facing off in a lip-sync contest and one of them will be eliminated from the competition. The contestants perform to "Sissy That Walk". Darienne Lake is eliminated, with Adore Delano, Bianca Del Rio, and Courtney Act being declared the finalists of the season.

== Production and broadcast ==
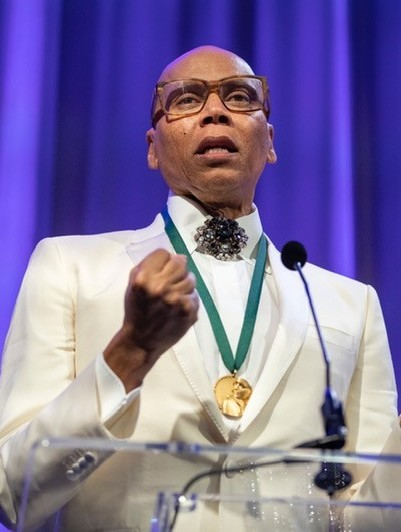
RuPaul (pictured in 2019) plays a character named Charles for one of the episode's sketches.

The episode originally aired on May 5, 2014.

For the fashion show, Adore Delano wears a dress with sequins. Bianca Del Rio presents a blue satin gown. Courtney Act has a short dress. Darienne Lake wears a long blue dress and a red wig.

The music video for "Sissy That Walk", which was released as the second single from RuPaul's studio album Born Naked, premiered exclusively on Billboard's website on May 12, 2014.

== Reception and legacy ==
Oliver Sava of The A.V. Club gave the episode a rating of 'B-'. Gregory Rosebrugh of IndieWire wrote, "A note to the producers of Drag Race: no more quadruple lip-syncs. We do not see enough of the four performers. The cross-editing is distracting and diminishes our interest. Anyway, for what it is worth Adore was the better of the four queens, and Bianca and Courtney were shockingly underwhelming!" Sam Brooks ranked the "Sissy That Walk" performance number 100 in The Spinoff's 2019 "definitive ranking" of the show's 162 lip-sync contests to date.

On the show's seventh season (2015) episode "Spoof! (There It Is)", contestants Jaidynn Diore Fierce, Max, and Violet Chachki do a parody of the "Sissy That Walk" music video, impersonating Biana Del Rio, Courtney Act, and Adore Delano, respectively. After the seventh season's twelfth episode (which has a similar main challenge tasking the contestants with performing in a music video) aired, Ruth Boulet of Stay Tuned Magazine said, "It's hard to follow-up Sissy That Walk, which was so fun for last season's finale. Born Naked is just kind of a 'meh' tempo & doesn't seem to give the girls much to do in their lip synch."

== See also ==
- RuPaul discography
