= Mathu Andersen =

Australian artist

- Occupations: Make-up artist; costume designer; photographer

Mathu Andersen is a make-up artist, costume designer, and photographer. Andersen has collaborated with RuPaul and was previously in a relationship with fashion designer Zaldy.

== Career ==
Andersen has a background in fashion and textile design. He and RuPaul collaborated for many years, until the ninth season of RuPaul's Drag Race; Andersen initially did RuPaul's hair and make-up, and later directed challenges and became a creative producer on the show. He was a guest judge on season two's "Here Comes the Bride" (2010), and he was a special guest on the fourth season's "The Final Three" (2012), the fifth season's "The Final Three, Hunty" (2013), the sixth season's "Sissy That Walk" (2014), and the seventh season's (2015) premiere episode ("Born Naked") and twelfth episode ("And the Rest Is Drag"). Andersen was nominated in the Outstanding Makeup for a Multi-Camera Series or Special (Non-Prosthetic) category at the 67th Primetime Emmy Awards in 2015 for his work on "ShakesQueer", the seventh season's third episode. The reasons for his departure from the show are unknown.

== Personal life ==
Andersen is originally from Australia. He moved to New York in 1986 and, according to Queerty, "teamed up with Zaldy Goco and became a fixture of NYC nightlife". Andersen moved to Los Angeles in 2002.

== Filmography ==
=== Film ===
Year	Title	Role
2009	This Is It	Makeup Designer: Lead Cast

=== Television ===
Year	Title	Role	Notes
1996-1998	The RuPaul Show	Makeup & Hair Stylist	
2004-2005	America's Next Top Model	Makeup Artist	12 Episodes
2009-2017	RuPaul's Drag Race	Creative & Consulting Producer	86 Episodes
2010	RuPaul's Drag U	Creative Producer	6 Episodes
2012-2016	RuPaul's Drag Race All Stars	Creative Producer	13 Episodes

=== Web Series ===
Year	Title	Role	Notes	Ref.
2013	Transformations	Himself	Episodes: "Mathu Andersen," "Mathu Andersen Returns!" & "Mathu Andersen Returns! Again!"	
2014	Raja Drawja	Himself	Episode: "Mathu Andersen"	
2015	Hey Qween!	Himself	Episode: "Mathu Andersen on Hey Qween with Jonny McGovern"	

=== Music Videos ===
Year	Title	Artist(s)	Notes
1999	"What's It Gonna Be?!"	Busta Rhymes feat. Janet Jackson	Makeup Artist
2010	"Jealous of My Boogie"	RuPaul feat. Tyra Sanchez, Raven and Jujubee	Director
2011	"Champion"	RuPaul	Director
2012	"Glamazon"	RuPaul	Director
2013	"The Beginning"	RuPaul	Director
2013	"RuPaulogize"	Willam Belli	Makeup Artist

== Awards and nominations ==
Year	Award	Category	Nominee(s)	Result	Ref.
2015	Primetime Emmy Awards	Outstanding Contemporary Makeup for a Multi-Camera Series or Special (Non-Prosthetic)	RuPaul's Drag Race	Nominated	
