= Sissy That Walk =

Single by RuPaul

from the album Born Naked
- Released: May 5, 2014
- Genre: Electropop
- Length: 3:32
- Label: RuCo
- Songwriters: RuPaul Charles; Lucian Piane
- Producer: Piane

RuPaul singles chronology
"Geronimo" (2014)	"Sissy That Walk" (2014)	"Modern Love" (2015)

Music video
- "Sissy That Walk" on YouTube

"Sissy That Walk" is a song recorded by the American drag queen RuPaul for his (Note: RuPaul has stated that he is indifferent to the use of he or she pronouns when referring to him. This article uses he/him for consistency.) seventh studio album, Born Naked (2014). The electropop song was written by RuPaul and Lucian Piane, with Piane also serving as its producer. It was released as the lead single of Born Naked by RuCo, Inc. on May 5, 2014. The song was later included on three of RuPaul's compilation albums: RuPaul Presents CoverGurlz2 (2015), Essential, Vol. 2 (2017), and Gold 2 (2024). It was also featured in the sixth and seventh seasons of RuPaul's Drag Race, serving as the runway theme song for both seasons.

A music video produced by World of Wonder was premiered by Billboard and Logo TV. It features appearances by the drag performers Courtney Act, Adore Delano, Bianca del Rio, Darienne Lake, and the Pit Crew. The video was created as part of a challenge in the sixth season of RuPaul's Drag Race, in the episode "Sissy That Walk", and then aired during the following episode, "Countdown to the Crown". Commercially, the song peaked at number 27 on the U.S. Billboard Hot Dance/Electronic Songs chart and number 14 on the Dance/Electronic Digital Songs chart.

The song has been described as a signature song of the Drag Race franchise and has been included on lists of RuPaul's best songs and the best songs by drag queens. It has been used in multiple editions of the franchise's lip sync contests, covered and parodied by other artists, and featured in other entertainment media. As of April 2022, "Sissy That Walk" is RuPaul's most-streamed song on Spotify, with over eighty million streams.

== Background and release ==
In an interview with Instinct, RuPaul was asked about working on new music and plans to release it early the following year. He responded "probably", noting that he was working with Lucian Piane and had a song that he described as the "biggest hit I've ever had in my life". He also revealed that the new music would be released alongside a new season of RuPaul's Drag Race. The track listing of RuPaul's seventh studio album, Born Naked, was revealed on February 21, 2014, where "Sissy That Walk" was listed as the album's second track. The song was released as part of Born Naked on February 24, 2014, on music download and streaming platforms, coinciding with the premiere of the sixth season of RuPaul's Drag Race.

"Sissy That Walk" was released as the lead single of Born Naked on May 5, 2014, accompanied by a lyric video. On February 3, 2015, a remix featuring drag performer Tempest DuJour was released on RuPaul Presents CoverGurlz2, a promotional compilation album for the seventh season of RuPaul's Drag Race. A music video was released on June 2, 2015. The song was also included on his compilation albums Essential, Vol. 2 (2017) and the vinyl LP Gold 2 (2024).

== Composition ==
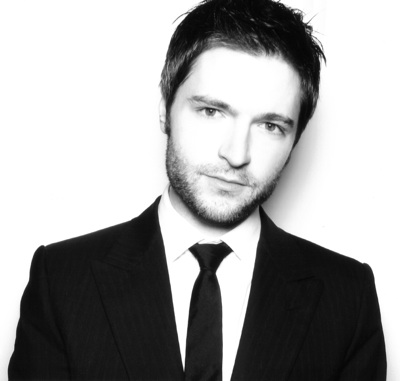
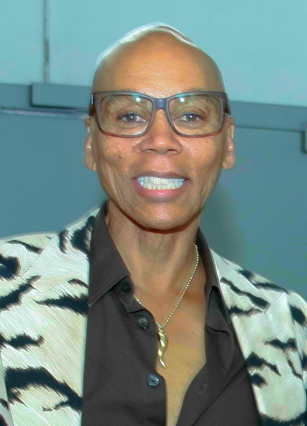
Lucian Piane (left) and RuPaul (right) wrote "Sissy That Walk".

"Sissy That Walk" was written by RuPaul and Lucian Piane; Piane also served as the song's producer. Described as an electropop song, it is three minutes and thirty-two seconds long. RuPaul first heard "sissy that walk" from his friend, writer Rich Juzwiak, who was working on a story about child pageants. Juzwiak had attended a pageant rehearsal where a coach told a contestant, "Girl, you better sissy that walk". RuPaul thought the expression was "brilliant" and began using it on RuPaul's Drag Race. When RuPaul and Lucian Piane began working on Born Naked, they agreed to develop a song around the expression. In his 2024 memoir, The House of Hidden Meanings, RuPaul revealed the lyric "If they ain't paying your bills, pay them bitches no mind" originated from his mother, Ernestine Charles.

== Reception ==
Conor Behan of PopCrush named "Sissy That Walk" RuPaul's second-best "banger", describing it as the "perfect queer party anthem" and praising its combination of dance-pop trends and drag references. Writing for Out, Justin Miller described the song as one of the more "strut-worthy" tracks on Born Naked. In a Rolling Stone article ranking the twenty best songs by drag queens, Tomás Mier and Brittany Spanos placed it in thirteenth place, with Mier calling it an "electro-pop drag runway staple". Billboard's Muri Assunção called highlighted the lyric "Unless they paying your bills, pay them bitches no mind" as an encapsulation of RuPaul's message of self-love and respect.

Commercially, the song debuted at number 44 on the Billboard Hot Dance/Electronic Songs chart. After re-entering at number 38, it peaked at number 27 the following week before falling to numbers 31 and 49 in its final two weeks on the chart. It also placed on the Dance/Electronic Digital Songs chart, where it peaked at number 14 and charted for four weeks.

== Promotion ==
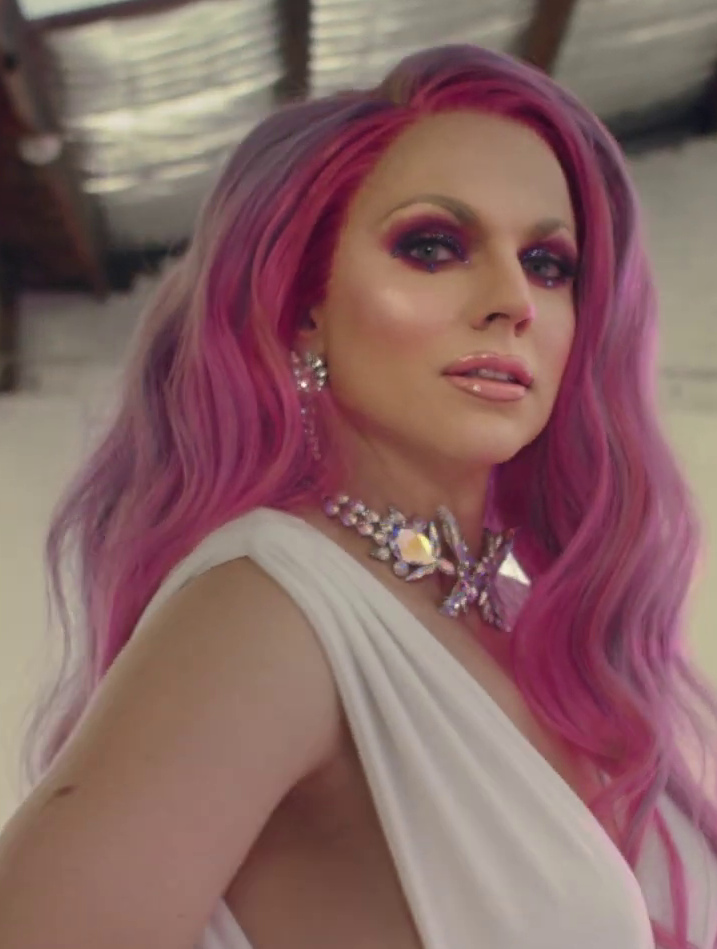
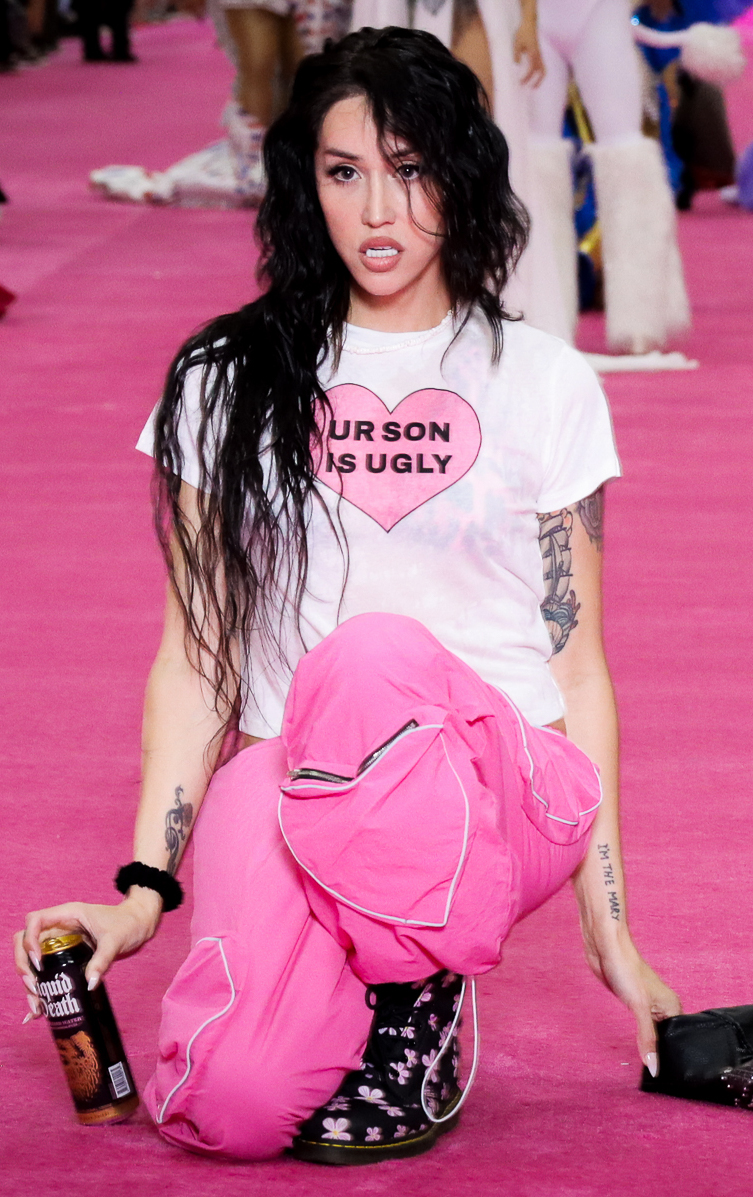
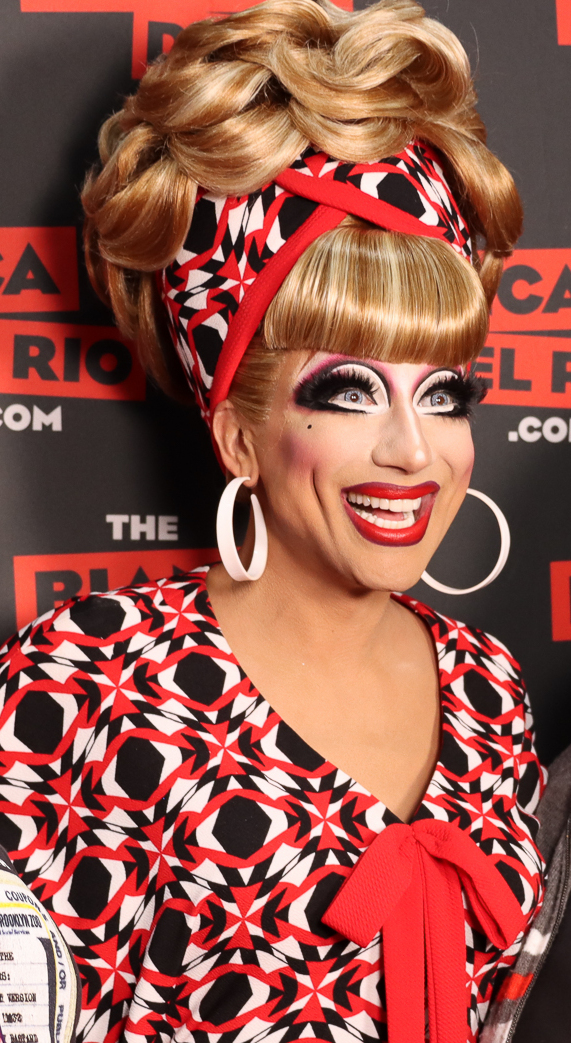
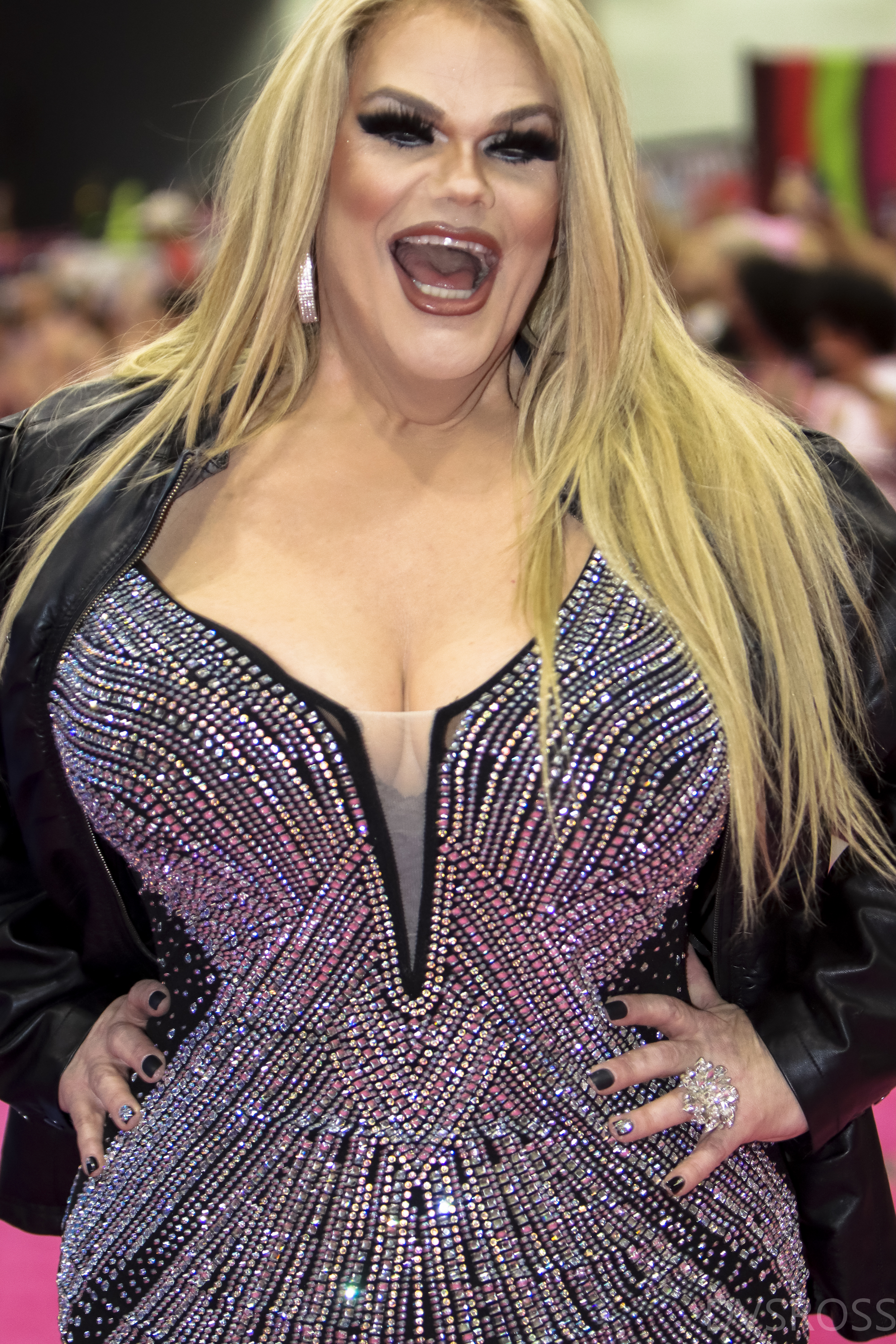
Clockwise: Courtney Act, Adore Delano, Darienne Lake and Bianca del Rio appear in the music video for "Sissy That Walk".

Before its release as a single, "Sissy That Walk" was uploaded to torrent websites as a promotional "decoy" version of RuPaul's seventh studio album, Born Naked (2014). The version begins with a few seconds of the original song before fading out, after which RuPaul delivers random commentary and mocks listeners for illegally downloading the album. The "decoy" version of the song was released on SoundCloud by Billboard on March 3, 2014.

A lyric video for "Sissy That Walk" was premiered by Entertainment Weekly on May 5, 2014, where fans of RuPaul's Drag Race submitted their own videos lip syncing to the song. Billboard premiered the music video for the song on May 12, 2014. Produced by World of Wonder, the video featured appearances by the drag performers Courtney Act, Adore Delano, Bianca del Rio, and Darienne Lake, who were contestants on the sixth season of RuPaul's Drag Race, as well as the Drag Race Pit Crew. It received its television premiere later that day on Logo TV, during the episode "Countdown to the Crown". The RuPaul's Drag Race episode "Sissy That Walk" features the contestants filming the music video.

On September 11, 2014, an episode of the web series Let the Music Play was released by World of Wonder, in which RuPaul explains the origin of the phrase "sissy that walk" and the song's writing process.

== Covers and legacy ==
On the RuPaul's Drag Race episode "Spoof! (There It Is)", Jaidynn Diore Fierce, Max and Violet Chachki wrote original lyrics and filmed a music video parodying "Sissy That Walk", where they imitate Bianca del Rio, Courtney Act and Adore Delano, respectively. British girl group Little Mix performed a medley of the song and "Supermodel (You Better Work)" (1992) during a surprise appearance at G-A-Y in London on July 4, 2015. Member Jade Thirlwall described the performance as "one of the best nights of my life", adding that she had "been harping on for ages" about the group covering a RuPaul song. RuPaul posted the performance to Twitter, where he called it a "hot cover".

French singer Christine and the Queens performed a cover of the song during the "Grand Finale" episode of the eleventh season of RuPaul's Drag Race, while past contestants walked the runway. American drag queen Lady Bunny released a COVID-19 pandemic-themed parody of the track, titled "Sissy That Cough", in support of her online show C#nt-agious (2020). As of April 16, 2022, the song is RuPaul's most-streamed track on Spotify, with more than eighty million streams. "Sissy That Walk" has been described as a signature song of Drag Race, with Tomás Mier of Rolling Stone calling it a "quintessential Drag Race theme song" and Billboard's Muri Assunção describing it as a "catchy Drag Race classic".

== Usage in media ==
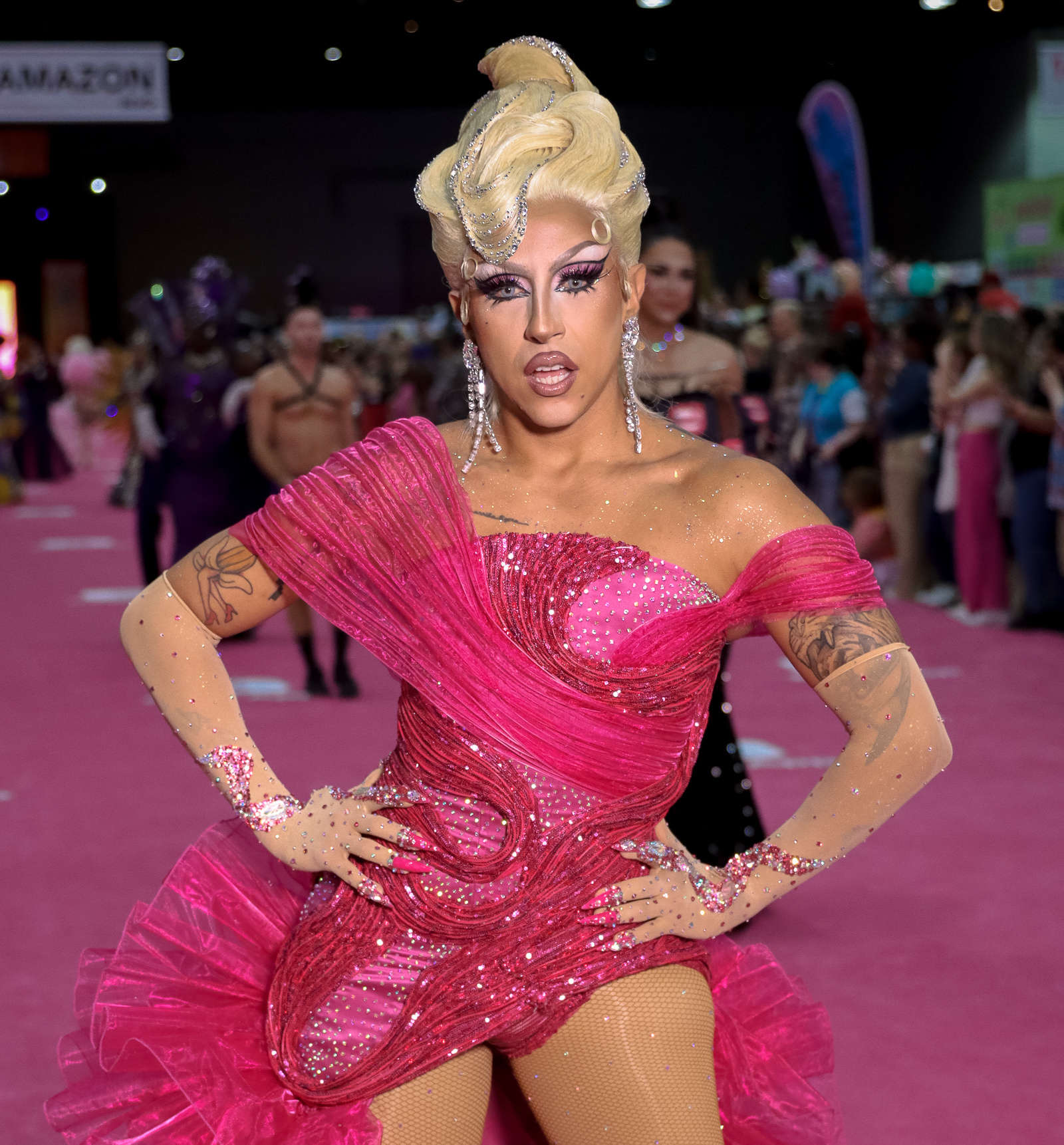
Lolita Banana (pictured) performed a routine to "Sissy That Walk" for Just Dance 2023 Edition (2022).

"Sissy That Walk" served as the runway theme for the sixth and seventh seasons of RuPaul's Drag Race. Adam Rippon and Jenna Johnson performed a cha-cha routine to the song during the twenty-sixth season of the American version of Dancing with the Stars, while Blu Hydrangea and Simone Arena performed a pasodoble to it on the Irish version of the show. The song was used in a promotional video for Saturday Night Live featuring RuPaul and Cecily Strong, released ahead of RuPaul's hosting appearance in February 2020. The song is also featured on the soundtrack of the dance rhythm game Just Dance 2023 Edition (2022), where its routine is performed by Mexican drag performer Lolita Banana, a co-host of Drag Race México.

The song has been used multiple times as a lip sync song in the Drag Race franchise. It first appeared on RuPaul's Drag Race in the episode "Sissy That Walk", where Adore Delano, Bianca del Rio, Courtney Act and Darienne Lake competed in a "Lip Sync for Your Life". It was later used in "All RuPaul-A-Paruza Smackdown", with Discord Addams and Jane Don't competing. On RuPaul's Drag Race: All Stars, the song was used in the "LaLaPaRUza" episode, where Latrice Royale and Mo Heart both won the lip sync, resulting in a double stay and Royale's return to the competition. On RuPaul's Secret Celebrity Drag Race, Mark Indelicato performed the song as Thirsty von Trap in "RuPaul-A-Palooza!". Internationally, Eva Le Queen and Precious Paula Nicole performed it in the first-season finale of Drag Race Philippines.

== Charts ==
Chart performance
Chart (2016)	Peak position
US Hot Dance/Electronic Songs (Billboard)	27
US Dance/Electronic Digital Songs (Billboard)	14

== Release history ==
Release dates and formats
Region	Date	Format	Label	Ref.
Various	May 5, 2014	Music download; streaming	RuCo	
