= Jasmine Masters =

American drag queen (born 1976)

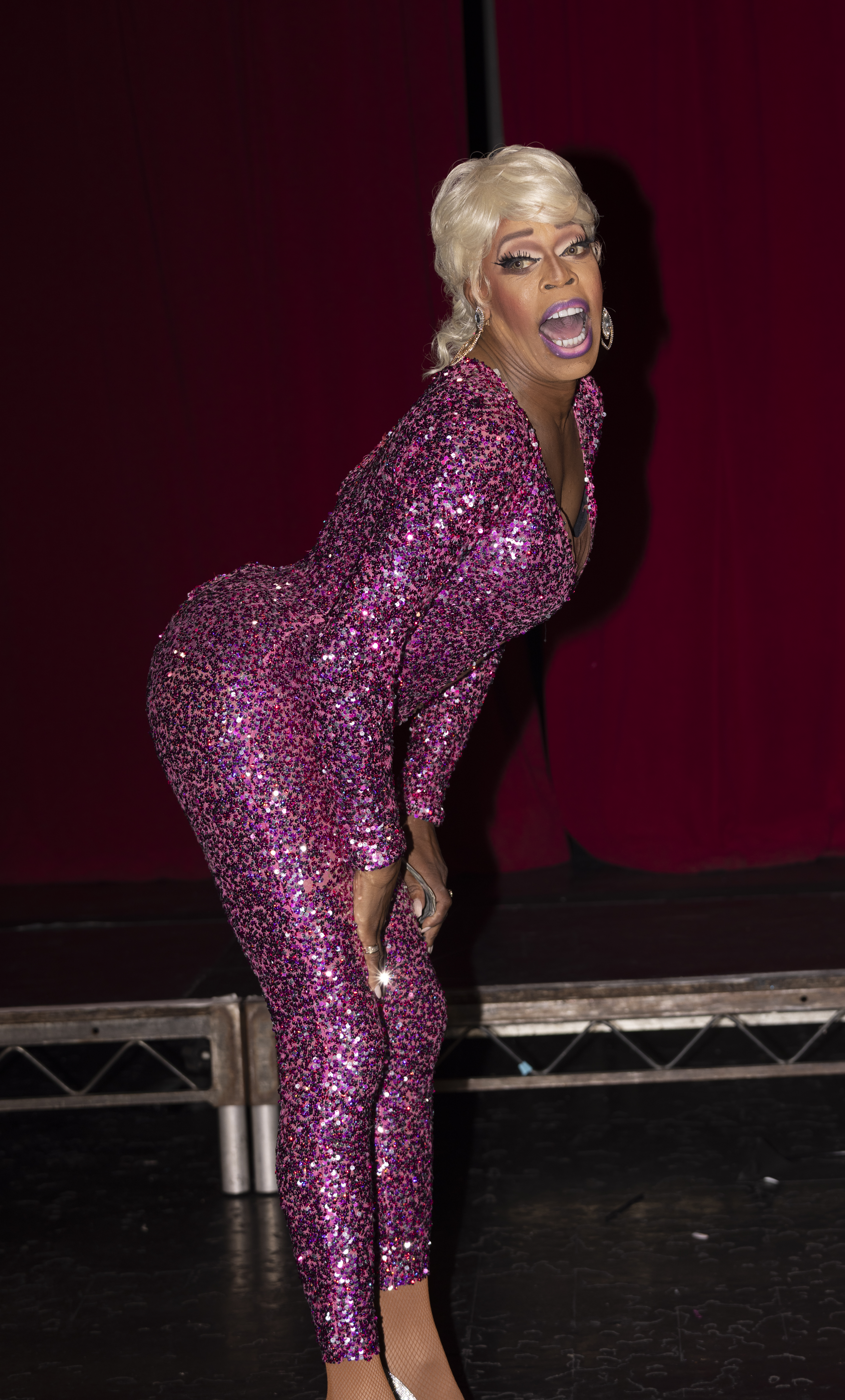
- Masters performing in 2025
- Born: Martell Robinson; October 16, 1976 (age 50); San Diego County, California, U.S.
- Other name: Jasmine Diane Masters
- Occupations: Drag queen, actor, singer
- Years active: 1997–present

YouTube information
- Channel: Jasmine Masters
- Years active: 2014–present
- Genres: Vlog, comedy
- Subscribers: 198 thousand
- Views: 19.1 million
- Last updated: 13 August 2021

Martell Robinson (born October 16, 1976), known by the stage name Jasmine Diane Masters, best known simply as Jasmine Masters, is an American drag queen, internet celebrity, YouTuber, and stand-up comedian. He is best known for competing on the seventh season of RuPaul's Drag Race and the fourth season of RuPaul's Drag Race All Stars. Robinson is responsible for several viral videos, many of which have become memes, most notably And I Oop! which was the most used gif of 2019.

== Early life ==
Martell Robinson was born on October 16, 1976, in the San Diego, California area. He first performed in drag at the age of 21, in 1997, by impersonating Patti LaBelle. The drag name "Jasmine Masters" came from Jasmine Guy and her drag mother, Destiny Masters. He auditioned for Drag Race beginning with Season two.

== Career ==
Before Drag Race, Robinson appeared as the character, Mordecai, in the 2008 film First Sunday. He also appeared with fellow Drag Race alumnus Willam for an episode of The New Normal in 2013.

=== RuPaul's Drag Race ===
Jasmine was announced as one of the fourteen contestants for season seven of RuPaul's Drag Race on March 2, 2015. She was eliminated in the third episode after lip-syncing against Kennedy Davenport, and placed 12th overall. During her time on the show, she received online death threats including racist remarks, which eventually led to RuPaul defending Masters on Twitter. Masters would be referenced in 2017 by Nina Bo'Nina Brown for season nine of Drag Race, with Brown impersonating her for the annual "Snatch Game".

Masters competed on the Drag Race television special RuPaul's Drag Race Holi-slay Spectacular. Masters later posted a YouTube video explaining why she wasn't featured as much as the other contestants in the special, stating that Shangela was late during one of the rehearsals, which caused Masters to become frustrated and leave the set early.

Masters was announced to compete on the fourth season of RuPaul's Drag Race All Stars. She was eliminated in the first episode by Trinity the Tuck after her stand-up performance for the annual talent show, placing 10th. She had a chance to return in sixth episode, where the eliminated queens faced off with the queens still in running, but lost a lip sync to Trinity, conclusively eliminating her from the competition.

She appeared as a guest for the first challenge in the premiere of season eleven of Drag Race.

=== After Drag Race ===
After Drag Race, she was one of thirty drag queens featured in Miley Cyrus's 2015 VMA performance.

Masters gained notoriety with her self-published YouTube videos on her channel. Her video "RuPaul Dragrace fucked up drag", criticizing the show's portrayal of drag, sparked criticism from fans and queens including Phi Phi O'Hara. The video was featured in Willam's internet show, "Willam's Beatdown". Her video "Fix ur breath" was featured in a post on Justin Bieber's Instagram page, making Masters go viral.

Because of Masters's viral success, she is the host of her own web show with WowPresents called "Jasmine Masters' Class" that premiered its first episode in 2018. She also was featured as a guest in an episode of Lemme Pick You Up with Ts Madison. She was a guest for multiple episodes of the web series "Wait, What?" with Kimora Blac.

She was with Tammie Brown, Miz Cracker, Eureka O'Hara, Shea Coulee and Ginger Minj for two episodes of the Billboard web series "Spillin' The Tea" in June 2018. She was with Trixie Mattel to discuss the Drag Race season ten contestants for Access.

Masters appeared in the music video for Latrice Royale's "Excuse the Beauty" on May 10, 2018 and Pandora Boxx's "Oops I Think I Pooped" on September 24, 2018.

Masters featured on the single "And I Oop!" by Adam Joseph in June 2019.

She is also working on a podcast called The Wake and Bake with Honey Davenport.

Since June 4, 2023, Masters hosts her own brunch & evening drag show each week called Jush Sundays in LGBTQ event space Fluid510 in Oakland, California. She invites drag race contestants and local drag queens to perform alongside her. This is the first major recurring drag show featuring TV stars in the San Francisco Bay Area.

Masters featured on the talk show Very Delta, hosted by drag queen Delta Work, on episode 63 "Do you Oop! like me?".

== In popular culture ==
A clip of Masters interrupting herself in shock, known as "And I Oop", became an internet meme in 2019. It originated from a 2015 YouTube video named "Jasmine Masters handle your liquor". According to Giphy, Masters' "And I Oop" was the most used gif of 2019, with over 419 million views. Masters also trademarked the term.

== Discography ==
=== Singles ===
==== As featured artist ====
Title	Year	Album
"Freaky Money" (RuPaul featuring Jasmine Masters)	2015	RuPaul Presents CoverGurlz 2

== Filmography ==
=== Movies ===
Year	Title	Role	Ref
2008	First Sunday	Mordecai	
2020	The Queens	Herself	

=== Television ===
Year	Title	Role	
2013	The New Normal		
2015	RuPaul's Drag Race (season 7)	Herself	Contestant (12th place)
2015	RuPaul's Drag Race: Untucked	Herself	
2018	RuPaul's Drag Race Holi slay Spectacular	Herself	Contestant (Joint winner)
2018	RuPaul's Drag Race: All Stars	Herself	Contestant (10th place)
2019	RuPaul's Drag Race (season 11)	Herself	Guest - episode 1
2019	Brunch With Tiffany	Herself	Guest
2023	The Real Housewives of Potomac	Herself	Episode: "Mic Drop"

=== Music videos ===
Year	Title	Ref.
2015	Shangela - Uptown Fish	
2018	Latrice Royale - Excuse the Beauty	
2018	Pandora Boxx - Oops I Think I Pooped	

=== Web series ===
Year	Title	Role	Notes	Ref
2015-2019	Hey Qween!	Herself	Guest; 2 episodes	
2016–2017	Drag Cousins	Herself	Co-host	
2018	Spillin' The Tea	Herself	Panelist	
2018–Present	Jasmine Masters Master Class	Herself	Host	
2018	Puff Puff Sessions	Herself	Episode: "Conspiracy Theories"	
2018	Lemme Pick You Up	Herself	Guest	
2018	Whatcha Packin'	Herself	Guest	
2018–19	Wait, What?	Herself	Guest	
2019	Brunch With Tiffany	Herself	Guest	
2019	Detailz	Herself	Guest	

== Awards and nominations ==
Year	Award giving body	Category	Work	Results	Ref.
2020	Shorty Awards	Gif of the Year	Jasmine Masters - "And I OOP"	Won	
