= And the Rest Is Drag =

- RuPaul's Drag Race episode
- Scene from the episode of Pearl performing in front of a green screen during the filming of a music video, as fellow contestants Violet Chachki, Kennedy Davenport, and Ginger Minj watch from the side
- Episode no.: Season 7 Episode 12
- Directed by: Nick Murray
- Original air date: May 18, 2015
- Running time: 42 minutes

Guest appearances
- Mathu Andersen; Candis Cayne

Episode chronology
← Previous "Hello, Kitty Girls!"	Next → "Countdown to the Crown"

"And the Rest Is Drag" is the twelfth episode of the seventh season of the American television series RuPaul's Drag Race. The episode was directed by Nick Murray and first aired on Logo TV on May 18, 2015. It was followed by an episode of the companion series RuPaul's Drag Race: Untucked.

The final challenge of "And the Rest Is Drag" has the remaining four contestants perform choreography for the official music video of "Born Naked" (featuring Clairy Browne), a song from RuPaul's 2014 studio album of the same name, and act alongside RuPaul in a series of three sketches directed by Mathu Andersen. Candis Cayne is a guest choreographer. The judging panel includes RuPaul, Michelle Visage, Carson Kressley, and Ross Mathews. Kennedy Davenport is eliminated from the competition, leaving Ginger Minj, Pearl, and Violet Chachki as finalists.

== Episode ==
Interviews with RuPaul

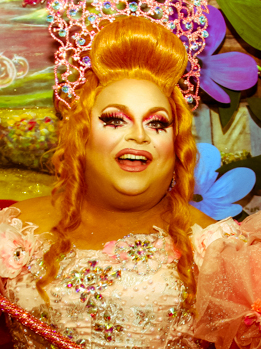
Lunch with Ginger Minj on YouTube

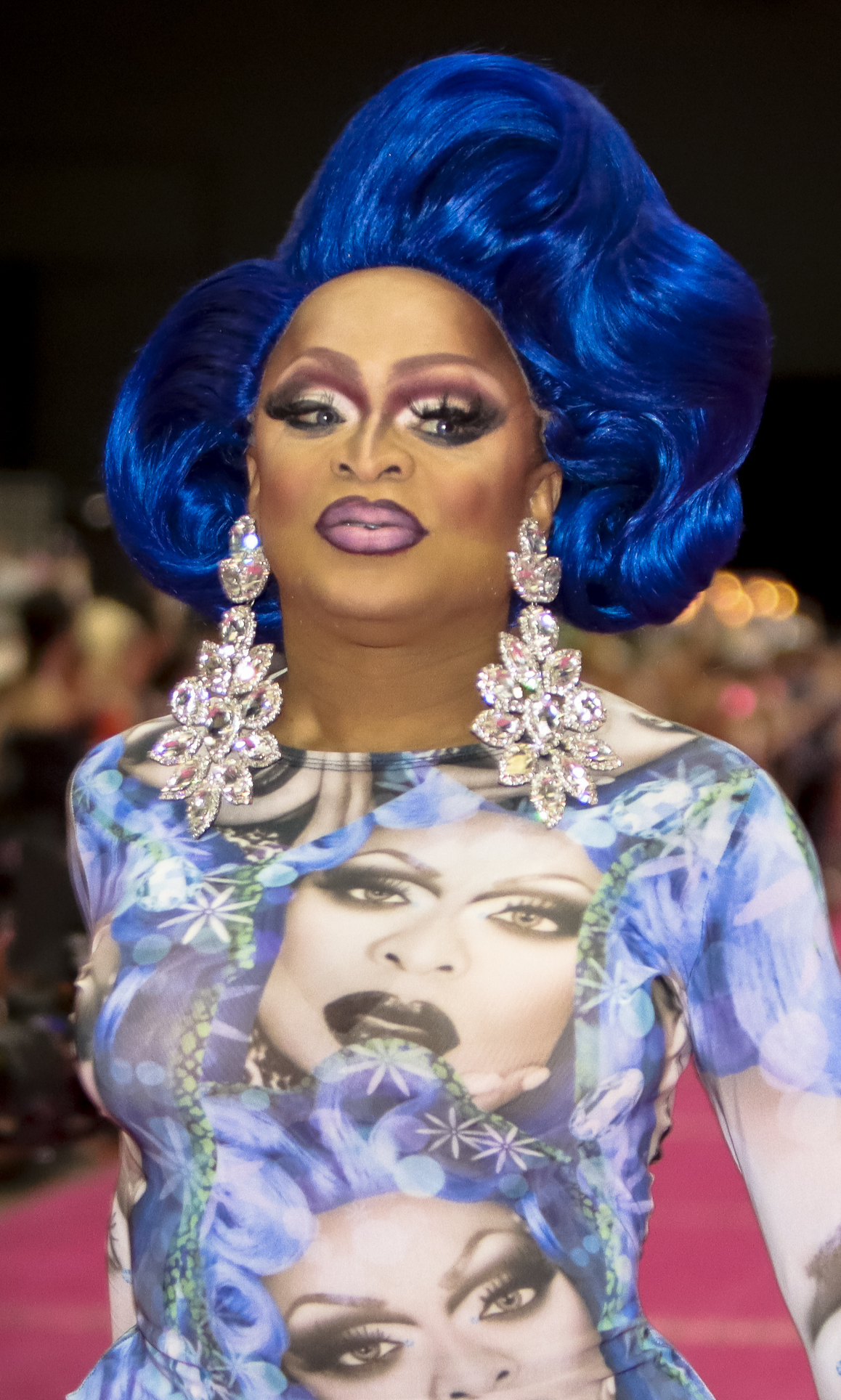
Lunch with Kennedy Davenport on YouTube

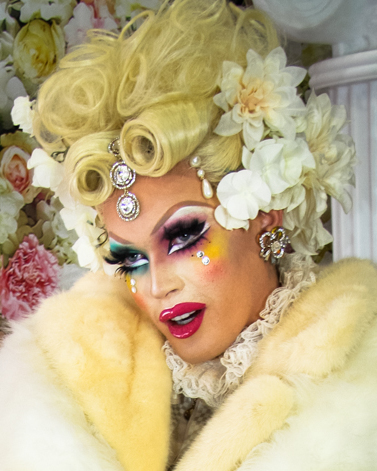
Lunch with Pearl on YouTube

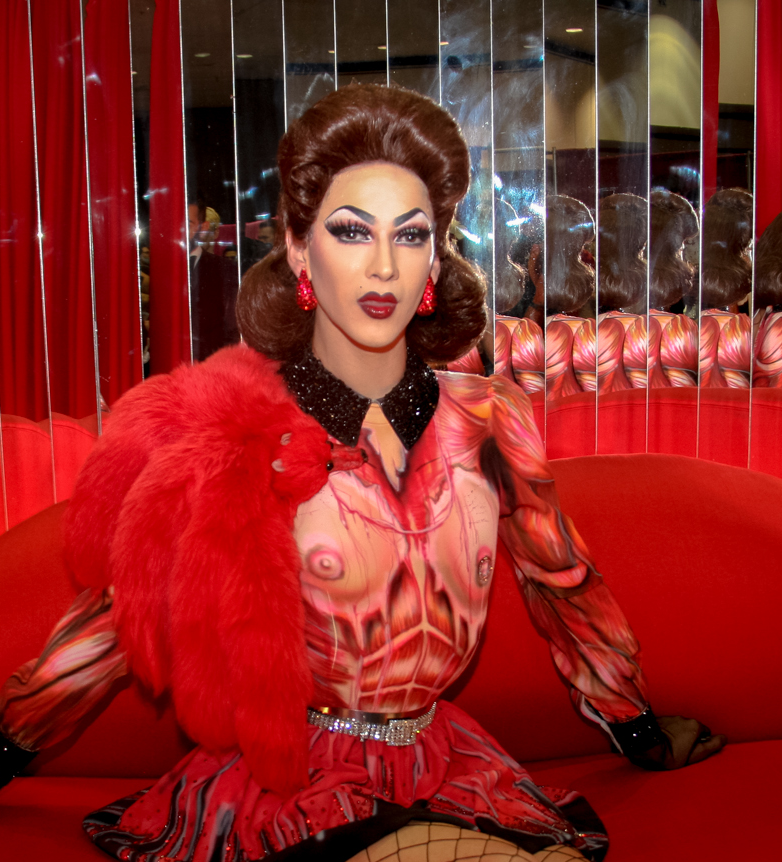
Lunch with Violet Chachki on YouTube

Links to RuPaul's interviews with the finalists competing in the seventh season's last challenge: Ginger Minj (top left), Kennedy Davenport (top right), Pearl (bottom left), and Violet Chachki (bottom right).

Following Katya's elimination, the remaining four contestants—Ginger Minj, Kennedy Davenport, Pearl, and Violet Chachki—re-enter the Werk Room. Michelle Visage reveals the final challenge, which tasks contestants with performing choreography in the official music video of RuPaul's song "Born Naked" (featuring Clairy Browne), as well as acting in three sketches directed by Mathu Andersen. She also invites the contestants to join RuPaul for one-on-one interviews, and reveals that the contestant who places in the bottom will be edited out of the music video.

Guest choreographer Candis Cayne coaches the contestants in the Werk Room. During her interview with RuPaul, Kennedy Davenport discusses her relationship with her late father and her feelings about his death. Kennedy Davenport also describes how she had to raise her sister, who has an intellectual disability. Ginger Minj talks about her father leaving their family for his high school girlfriend, and Pearl reveals that she experienced multiple forms of trauma at a young age. Violet Chachki describes feeling overlooked as a child because of her sister.

The contestants film their contributions for the music video in front of a green screen, with assistance from Cayne. An electric fan causes problems with Ginger Minj's and Pearl's wigs. Violet Chachki loses an earring and struggles with choreography. For the acting part of the challenge, RuPaul joins the contestants, who rotate roles. Kennedy Davenport struggles to differentiate her three characters. Back in the Werk Room, the contestants prepare for the main stage and runway and share their first impressions of each other. Ginger Minj and Kennedy Davenport, who have dubbed themselves the "Bitter Old Lady Brigade", question if Violet Chachki is experienced and emotionally mature enough to be the season's winner and representative.

On the main stage, RuPaul welcomes fellow judges Visage, Carson Kressley, and Ross Mathews. The runway category is "Best Drag". After the contestants present their looks, RuPaul asks each to share words of advice to their younger selves. The judges view scenes from the sketches directed by Andersen and share their final critiques with the contestants. RuPaul asks the contestants to explain why they should be named "America's next drag superstar" over their opponents. The contestants leave the stage, and the judges deliberate. RuPaul asks all four contestants to face off in a lip-sync to "Born Naked"; it is Violet Chachki's first throughout the show. Kennedy Davenport is eliminated from the competition, leaving three finalists to advance. RuPaul asks viewers to share on social media who they want to win, ahead of the season finale.

== Production and broadcast ==
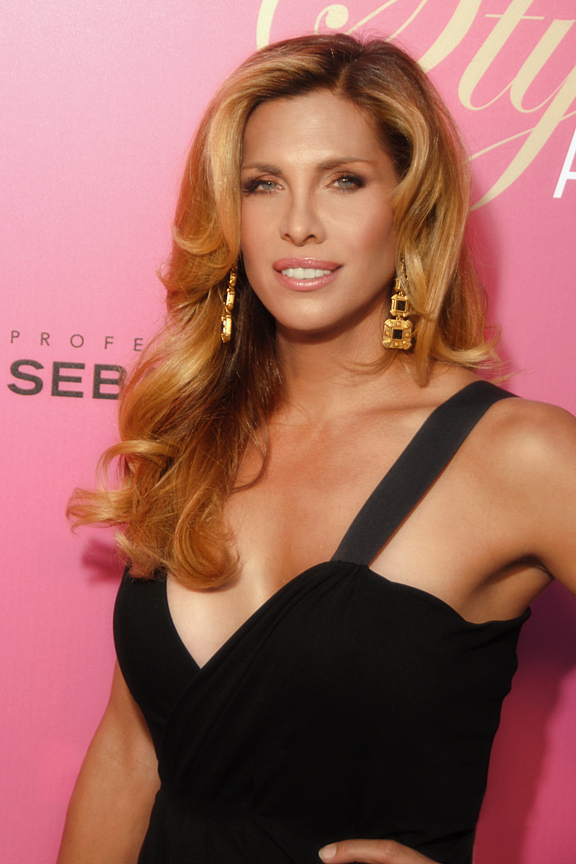
American actress and performance artist Candis Cayne (pictured in 2009) is the episode's guest choreographer.

The 42-minute episode was directed by Nick Murray, and originally aired on Logo TV in the U.S. on May 18, 2015. The episode's premiere was seen by close to 310,000 viewers. Its title refers to a lyric and phrasing ("we're all born naked, and the rest is drag") used prominently by RuPaul. The song "Born Naked", from RuPaul's 2014 studio album of the same name, explores this idea.

Andersen and RuPaul collaborated for many years, until the show's ninth season; Andersen initially did RuPaul's hair and make-up, then directed challenges and became a creative producer of Drag Race. He was a guest judge in the second season and special guest in episodes of the fourth to seventh seasons. For his make-up work in "ShakesQueer", the seventh season's third episode, Andersen received a nomination during the 67th Primetime Emmy Awards. Entertainment Weekly described Andersen's sketches in "And the Rest Is Drag" as a "Klumps-style dinner scene" in which RuPaul plays a "dusty old dad" and the contestants portray a "moody" teenager, an "annoying" young girl, and a "pilled-out" mother.

Cayne, a transgender actress and performance artist, has made multiple appearances on Drag Race as well as the spin-off RuPaul's Drag U. Like Andersen, she was a special guest on Drag Race's fourth and fifth seasons and a guest judge on the ninth season's "Snatch Game" episode. City Newspaper said her choreography in "And the Rest Is Drag" is "in the style of 1980's pop idols like Sheena Easton and Paula Abdul".

=== Fashion ===
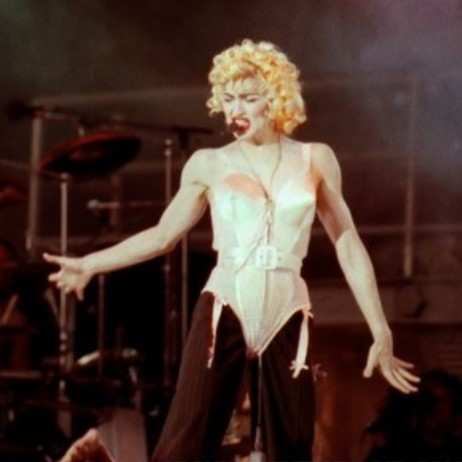
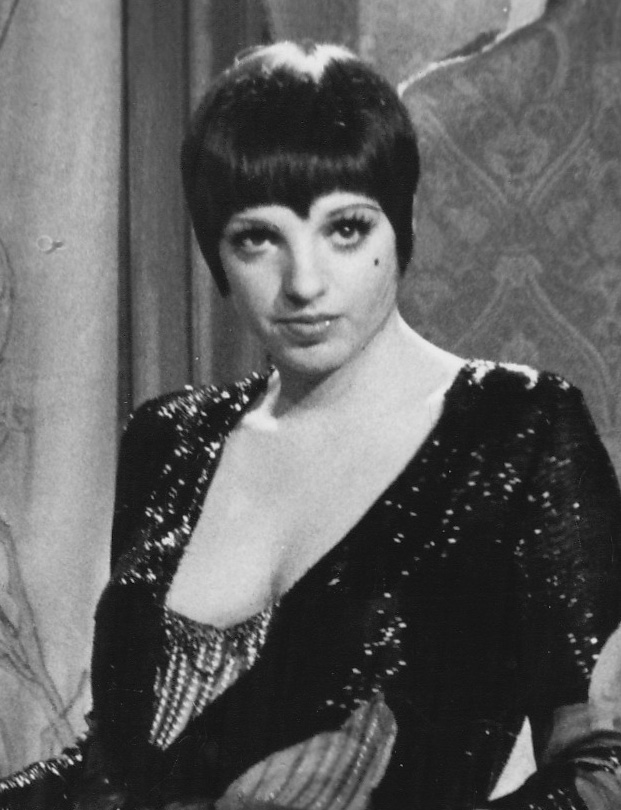
Writers for The Guardian compared the final looks by Pearl and Violet Chachki to Madonna during her Blond Ambition era (top) and Sally Bowles (bottom, as portrayed by Liza Minnelli in the 1972 film Cabaret), respectively.

For the runway, Kennedy Davenport wears a rainbow-colored outfit covered in rhinestones. Violet Chachki says her own look is inspired by burlesque, Marlene Dietrich, and Victor Victoria. Ginger Minj wears a pageant-style dress with white fringe. Pearl describes her look as "sexy" and "vintage", and Kressley calls her look "something from the Dee Snider intimates collection". Entertainment Weekly called her outfit a negligee with a "gauzy" cape. Writers for The Guardian said Violet Chachki wore "another super-tight corset looking, for all the world, like Sally Bowles in Cabaret" and Pearl presented "a very Madonna circa Blond Ambition inspired number".

== Reception ==
Oliver Sava of The A.V. Club gave the episode a rating of 'C' and said it was "a total drag ... losing the energy and character that makes this series so enjoyable and replacing it with sob stories and bitterness as the queens get ready to head into the finale." Sava opined:

The biggest problem with this episode is that it's another final competition episode with four queens instead of three, which means the individual contestants don't get as much time in the spotlight... A four-person lip sync is fun when its two pairs, but four individuals lip syncing is chaotic and unfocused; nobody comes out on top because there's so much happening on stage, so everyone gets lost in the madness. We'll find out who wins it all in two weeks, but this episode doesn't do much to build anticipation for the finale.

The Guardian said the episode "got pretty shady" with "the two bigger, older glamour queens on one side of the room and the two skinny, pretty-girl millennial queens on the other". Joe Ehrman-Dupre of IndieWire said the episode was atypical and wrote, "This time, things get personal, and while the challenge is important, the episode is really all about the queen's stories and interactions". Channel Guide Magazine said: "It's hard to follow-up 'Sissy That Walk', which was so fun for last season's finale. 'Born Naked' is just kind of a 'meh' tempo and doesn't seem to give the girls much to do in their lip synch." In a 2016 review of a similar episode for the eighth season in which the final four contestants appear in a music video to a RuPaul song ("The Realness"), Michael Malice of The New York Observer wrote, "This challenge is clearly irrelevant in choosing who goes forward. Last year, Kennedy Davenport—one of the best dancers the show has ever seen—ended up sashaying after the equivalent episode, while two-left-feet Pearl remained." In 2019, Bernardo Sim included Pearl in Screen Rant's overview of ten contestants who participated in the finale but had no chance of winning. He said Pearl "agitated a significant number of fans" for being a finalist instead of Kennedy Davenport.

== See also ==
- RuPaul discography
