= Primetime Emmy Award for Outstanding Makeup for a Variety, Nonfiction or Reality Program =

Television award category

- Awarded for: Outstanding Makeup for a Variety, Nonfiction or Reality Program
- Country: United States
- Presented by: Academy of Television Arts & Sciences
- Currently held by: SNL50: The Anniversary Special (2025)
- Website: emmys.com

This is a list of winners and nominees of the Primetime Emmy Award for Outstanding Makeup for a Variety, Nonfiction or Reality Program. From 2000 until 2019, the award was presented as Outstanding Makeup for a Multi-Camera Series or Special (Non-Prosthetic) before being renamed.

In the following list, the first titles listed in gold are the winners; those not in gold are nominees, which are listed in alphabetical order. The years given are those in which the ceremonies took place:

== Winners and nominations ==
=== 2000s ===
Outstanding Makeup for a Multi-Camera Series or Special (Non-Prosthetic)

| Year | Program | Episode | Nominees | Network |
|---|---|---|---|---|
2008 (60th)
| 2008 (60th) | Dancing with the Stars | "Episode 503" | Melanie Mills, Zena Shteysel, Patti Ramsey Bortoli, Nadege Schoenfeld | ABC |
| 2008 (60th) | MADtv | "Episode 1308" | Jennifer Aspinall, Heather Mages, Chris Burgoyne, Ned Neidhardt | Fox |
| 2008 (60th) | So You Think You Can Dance | "Episode 311" | Amy Strozzi, Heather Cummings, Tifanie White, Crystal Wolfchild | Fox |
| 2008 (60th) | Two and a Half Men | "City of Great Racks" | Janice Berridge, Peggy Nichols, Shelley Woodhouse, Gabriel Solana | CBS |
2009 (61st)
| 2009 (61st) | MADtv | "Episode 1405" | Jennifer Aspinall, Alexei O'Brien, David Williams, Heather Mages | Fox |
| 2009 (61st) | Dancing with the Stars | "Episode 804" | Melanie Mills, Zena Shteysel, Patti Ramsey Bortoli, Angela Moos | ABC |
| 2009 (61st) | Saturday Night Live | "Host: Josh Brolin" | Louie Zakarian, Josh Turi, Amy Tagliamonti | NBC |
| 2009 (61st) | So You Think You Can Dance | "Episode 421/422A" | Amy Strozzi, Heather Cummings, Tifanie White, Marie DelPrete | Fox |

=== 2010s ===
| Year | Program | Episode | Nominees | Network |
|---|---|---|---|---|
2010 (62nd)
| 2010 (62nd) | Saturday Night Live | "Host: Betty White" | Louie Zakarian, Josh Turi, Amy Tagliamonti | NBC |
| 2010 (62nd) | The 82nd Annual Academy Awards | | Bruce Grayson, Barbara Fonte-Kunkel, Lori Benson, Melanie Mills | ABC |
| 2010 (62nd) | The Big Bang Theory | "The Electric Can Opener Fluctuation" | Peggy Nichols, Ken Diaz, Vikki McCarter | CBS |
| 2010 (62nd) | Dancing with the Stars | "Episode 901A" | Melanie Mills, Zena Shteysel, Patti Ramsey Bortoli, Angela Moos, Barbara Fonte-Kunkel, Nadege Schoenfeld | ABC |
| 2010 (62nd) | So You Think You Can Dance | "Episode 615/616A" | Amy Strozzi, Heather Cummings, Crystal Wolfchild, Tifanie White, Adam Christopher | Fox |
2011 (63rd)
| 2011 (63rd) | Saturday Night Live | "Host: Jon Hamm" | Louie Zakarian, Josh Turi, Amy Tagliamonti, Katherine O'Donnell | NBC |
| 2011 (63rd) | Dancing with the Stars | "Episode 1205" | Melanie Mills, Zena Shteysel, Patti Ramsey Bortoli, Angela Moos, Barbara Fonte-Kunkel, Nadege Schoenfeld | ABC |
| 2011 (63rd) | How I Met Your Mother | "Bad News" | Jennifer Turchi Nigh, Megan Moore, Brad Look | CBS |
| 2011 (63rd) | iCarly | "iStart a Fan War" | Michael Johnston, Patti Brand, Melanie Mills, Tyson Fountaine, Patti Ramsey Bortoli, Kim Perrodin | Nickelodeon |
| 2011 (63rd) | The Pee-wee Herman Show on Broadway | | Cristina Waltz, Katie Pellegrino | HBO |
2012 (64th)
| 2012 (64th) | Dancing with the Stars | "Episode 1307" | Zena Shteysel, Angela Moos, Patti Ramsey Bortoli, Barbara Fonte-Kunkel, Sarah Woolf, Nadege Schoenfeld | ABC |
| 2012 (64th) | Hot in Cleveland | "Bridezelka" | Lori Benson, Lisa Ashley, Deborah Humphries | TV Land |
| 2012 (64th) | How I Met Your Mother | "Trilogy Time" | Jennifer Turchi Nigh, Megan Moore, Kevin Haney | CBS |
| 2012 (64th) | Saturday Night Live | "Host: Katy Perry" | Louie Zakarian, Josh Turi, Amy Tagliamonti, Danilo Zivkovic, Tom Denier Jr. | NBC |
| 2012 (64th) | Victorious | "April Fools Blank" | Michael Johnston, Patti Brand, Melanie Mills, Nadege Schoenfeld, Lucine Galadjian (personal makeup artist) | Nickelodeon |
2013 (65th)
| 2013 (65th) | Saturday Night Live | "Host: Justin Timberlake" | Louie Zakarian, Josh Turi, Amy Tagliamonti, Daniela Zivkovic, Melanie Demetri | NBC |
| 2013 (65th) | Dancing with the Stars | "Episode 1603" | Zena Shteysel, Angela Moos, Patti Ramsey Bortoli, Barbara Fonte-Kunkel, Sarah Woolf, Julie Socash | ABC |
| 2013 (65th) | How I Met Your Mother | "P.S. I Love You" | Jennifer Turchi Nigh, Megan Moore, Brian Sipe, Cheryl Calo, Renee Caruso | CBS |
| 2013 (65th) | Key & Peele | "Gangsta Standoff" | Scott Wheeler, Suzanne Diaz | Comedy Central |
| 2013 (65th) | The Oscars | | Bruce Grayson, Barbara Fonte-Kunkel, Patricia Bunch, Farah Bunch, Kenneth Paul Schoenfeld, Eryn Krueger Mekash | ABC |
2014 (66th)
| 2014 (66th) | Saturday Night Live | "Host: Jimmy Fallon" | Louie Zakarian, Amy Tagliamonti, Sarah Egan, Daniela Zivkovic, Melanie Demetri | NBC |
| 2014 (66th) | Dancing with the Stars | "Episode 1703" | Zena Shteysel, Angela Moos, Patti Ramsey Bortoli, Barbara Fonte-Kunkel, Sarah Woolf, Julie Socash | ABC |
| 2014 (66th) | Key & Peele | "East/West Bowl Rap" | Scott Wheeler, Suzanne Diaz, David LeRoy Anderson, Georgia Allen | Comedy Central |
| 2014 (66th) | So You Think You Can Dance | "Season 10 Finale" | Heather Cummings, Amy Harmon, Angela Nogaro, Allan Avendano, Shutchai Tym Buacharern | Fox |
| 2014 (66th) | The Voice | "Episode 516B" | Darcy Gilmore, Sherri Simmons, Thea Samuels, Kristene Bernard, Carlene Kearns, Molly Tissavary | NBC |
2015 (67th)
| 2015 (67th) | Saturday Night Live 40th Anniversary Special | | Louie Zakarian, Amy Tagliamonti, Jason Milani, Sarah Egan, Daniela Zivkovic, Melanie Demetri | NBC |
| 2015 (67th) | Dancing with the Stars | "Episode 1907" | Zena Shteysel, Angela Moos, Patti Ramsey Bortoli, Julie Socash, Alison Gladieux, Sarah Woolf | ABC |
| 2015 (67th) | Key & Peele | "Scariest Movie Ever" | Scott Wheeler, Suzanne Diaz | Comedy Central |
| 2015 (67th) | RuPaul's Drag Race | "ShakesQueer" | Mathu Andersen | Logo |
| 2015 (67th) | So You Think You Can Dance | "Episode 1108" | Heather Cummings, Marie Del Prete, Amy Harmon, Tyson Fountaine, Adam Christopher | Fox |
2016 (68th)
| 2016 (68th) | Key & Peele | "Y'all Ready for This?" | Scott Wheeler, Suzy Diaz, Jason Hamer, Natalie Thimm, Michael Blake | Comedy Central |
| 2016 (68th) | Dancing with the Stars | "Halloween Night" | Zena Shteysel, Angela Moos, Patti Ramsey Bortoli, Sarah Woolf, Julie Socash, Alison Gladieux | ABC |
| 2016 (68th) | Grease: Live | | Zena Shteysel, Angela Moos, Julie Socash, Alison Gladieux | Fox |
| 2016 (68th) | Saturday Night Live | "Host: Ryan Gosling" | Louie Zakarian, Amy Tagliamonti, Jason Milani, Sarah Egan, Daniela Zivkovic, Melanie Demetri, Margie Durand | NBC |
| 2016 (68th) | The Wiz Live! | | Cookie Jordan, Matiki Anoff, Debi Young, Stephanie McGee, Bjorn Rehbein, Christine Domaniecki | NBC |
2017 (69th)
| 2017 (69th) | Saturday Night Live | "Host: Alec Baldwin" | Louie Zakarian, Amy Tagliamonti, Jason Milani, Daniela Zivkovic, Rachel Pagani, Andrew Sotomeyer | NBC |
| 2017 (69th) | Dancing with the Stars | "Halloween Night" | Zena Shteysel, Angela Moos, Julie Socash, Patti Ramsey Bortoli, Sarah Woolf, Donna Bard | ABC |
| 2017 (69th) | Hairspray Live! | | Melanie Hughes-Weaver, Judy Yonemoto, Jill Cady, Julie Socash, Shutchai Tym Buacharern, Angela Moos | NBC |
| 2017 (69th) | MADtv | "Episode 4" | Jennifer Aspinall, Scott G. Wheeler, David Williams, James Rohland, Ned Niedhardt | The CW |
| 2017 (69th) | RuPaul's Drag Race | "Oh. My. Gaga!" | Jen Fregozo, Nicole Faulkner, Natasha Marcelina | VH1 |
| 2017 (69th) | The Voice | "Live Playoffs, Night 1" | Darcy Gilmore, Kristene Bernard, Thea Samuels, Gina Ghiglieri, Diane Mayo, Jackie Dobbie | NBC |
2018 (70th)
| 2018 (70th) | Saturday Night Live | "Host: Tina Fey" | Louie Zakarian, Amy Tagliamonti, Jason Milani, Daniela Zivkovic, Rachel Pagani, Sarah Egan | NBC |
| 2018 (70th) | Dancing with the Stars | "Halloween Night" | Zena Shteysel, Angela Moos, Julie Socash, Patti Ramsey-Bortoli, Sarah Woolf, Donna Bard | ABC |
| 2018 (70th) | Jesus Christ Superstar Live in Concert | | Joe Dulude II, Angela L. Johnson, Milagros Medina-Cerdeira, LaSoyna Gunter, Margie Durand, Andrew Sotomayor | NBC |
| 2018 (70th) | RuPaul's Drag Race | "10s Across the Board" | Jen Fregozo, Nicole Faulkner, Natasha Marcelina, David Petruschin | VH1 |
| 2018 (70th) | The Voice | "Live Finale, Part 1" | Darcy Gilmore, Kristene Bernard, Gina Ghiglieri, Kathleen Karridene | NBC |
2019 (71st)
| 2019 (71st) | Saturday Night Live | "Host: Adam Sandler" | Louie Zakarian, Amy Tagliamonti, Jason Milani, Rachel Pagani, Sarah Egan, Young Beck | NBC |
| 2019 (71st) | Dancing with the Stars | "Halloween Night" | Zena Shteysel, Angela Moos, Patti Ramsey-Bortoli, Julie Socash, Alison Gladieux, Donna Bard | ABC |
| 2019 (71st) | RENT | | Zena Shteysel, Angela Moos, Donna Bard, Julie Socash, Rocky Faulkner, Bruce Grayson | Fox |
| 2019 (71st) | RuPaul's Drag Race | "Trump: The Rusical" | Adam Burrell, Nicole Faulkner, Jen Fregozo, Natasha Marcelina, Karen Mitchell | VH1 |
| 2019 (71st) | So You Think You Can Dance | "Finale" | Tonia Green, Danielle Saunders, Alison Gladieux, Silvia Leczel, Michelle Ramos | Fox |
| 2019 (71st) | The Voice | "Live Top 13 Performances" | Darcy Gilmore, Kristene Bernard, Gina Ghiglieri, Kathleen Karridene, Nikki Carbonetta, Erin Guth | NBC |

=== 2020s ===
| Year | Program | Episode | Nominees | Network |
|---|---|---|---|---|
2020 (72nd)
| 2020 (72nd) | RuPaul's Drag Race | "I'm That Bitch" | Natasha Marcelina, David Petruschin, Jen Fregozo, Nicole Faulkner | VH1 |
| 2020 (72nd) | Dancing with the Stars | "Disney Night" | Zena Shteysel Green, Angela Moos, Patti Ramsey-Bortoli, Sarah Woolf, Julie Socash, Alison Gladieux, Donna Bard, Nadege Schoenfeld | ABC |
| 2020 (72nd) | The Little Mermaid Live! | | Bruce Grayson, Angela Moos, Jennifer Aspinall, Julie Socash, Valerie Hunt, Tym Buacharen, Jennifer Nigh, Robin Beauchesne | ABC |
| 2020 (72nd) | The Oscars | | Bruce Grayson, Angela Moos, Jill Cady, Peter D'Oliveira, Zena Shteysel, Jennifer Aspinall, James MacKinnon, Deborah Huss Humphries | ABC |
| 2020 (72nd) | The Voice | "Top 10" | Darcy Diana Gilmore, Kathleen Karridene, Alexis Walker, Nikki Carbonetta, Erin Guth, Gregory Arlt, Michelle DeMilt, Gloria Elias-Foillet | NBC |
2021 (73rd)
| 2021 (73rd) | Saturday Night Live | "Host: Elon Musk" | Louie Zakarian, Amy Tagliamonti, Chris Milone, Jason Milani, Kim Weber, Joanna Pisani, Young Bek | NBC |
| 2021 (73rd) | Dancing with the Stars | "Top 11" | Zena Shteysel Green, Julie Socash, Donna Bard, Sarah Woolf, Alison Gladieux, Victor Del Castillo, Rosetta Garcia, Lois Harriman | ABC |
| 2021 (73rd) | Legendary | "Pop Tart" | Tonia Green, Tyson Fountaine, Silvia Leczel, Jennifer Fregozo, Glen Alen Gutierrez, Sean Conklin, Valente Frazier, Marcel Banks | HBO Max |
| 2021 (73rd) | Mariah Carey's Magical Christmas Special | | Bruce Grayson, Angela Moos, James Mackinnon, Kristofer Buckle, Deborah Huss Humphries, Julie Socash | Apple TV+ |
| 2021 (73rd) | RuPaul's Drag Race | "The Pork Chop" | David Petruschin, Jen Fregozo, Nicole Faulkner | VH1 |
2022 (74th)
| 2022 (74th) | Legendary | "Whorror House" | Tonia Green, Tyson Fountaine, Sean Conklin, Marcel Banks, Jennifer Fregozo, Silvia Leczel, Glen Alen | HBO Max |
| 2022 (74th) | We're Here | "Kona, Hawaii" | Jeremy "6" Austin, Martin de Luna Jr. "Lushious Massacr", Tyler "Laila McQueen" Devlin | HBO |
2023 (75th)
| 2023 (75th) | Beauty and the Beast: A 30th Celebration | | Bruce Grayson, James MacKinnon, Sam Fine, Julie Socash, Melanie Hughes-Weaver, Neicy Small, Alexei Dmitriew, Tyson Fountaine | ABC |
2024 (76th)
| 2024 (76th) | Saturday Night Live | "Host: Ryan Gosling" | Louie Zakarian, Jason Milani, Amy Tagliamonti, Rachel Pagani, Young Bek, Brandon Grether, Joanna Pisani | NBC |
| 2024 (76th) | The Boulet Brothers' Dragula | "Terror in the Woods" | The Boulet Brothers | Shudder |
| 2024 (76th) | Dancing with the Stars | "Monster Night" | Zena S. Green, Julie Socash, Angela Moos, Donna Bard, Sarah Woolf, Brian Sipe, James MacKinnon, Tyson Fountaine | ABC |
| 2024 (76th) | Taylor Mac's 24-Decade History of Popular Music | | Anastasia Durasova | HBO |
| 2024 (76th) | The Voice | "Live Finale, Part 1 and Live Finale, Part 2" | Darcy Gilmore, Gina Ghiglieri, Kristene Bernard, Nikki Carbonetta, Carlene Kearns, Elie Maalouf, Anthony Nguyen, Marylin Lee Spiegel | NBC |
| 2024 (76th) | We're Here | "Oklahoma, Part 3" | Tyler "Laila" Devlin, Kalyd Sebastian Odeh | HBO |
2025 (77th)
| 2025 (77th) | SNL50: The Anniversary Special | | Louie Zakarian, Jason Milani, Amy Tagliamonti, Rachel Pagani, Young Bek, Stephen Kelley, Joanna Pisani | NBC |
| 2025 (77th) | The Boulet Brothers' Dragula | "Welcome to Hell!" | The Boulet Brothers | Shudder |
| 2025 (77th) | Dancing with the Stars | "Halloween Nightmares" | Zena S. Green, Julie Socash, Donna Bard, Lois Harriman, Brian Sipe, James MacKinnon, Tyson Fountaine, Angela Moos | ABC |
| 2025 (77th) | The Lion King at the Hollywood Bowl | | Bruce Grayson, Jill Cady, Brielle McKenna, James MacKinnon, Rochelle Uribe, Tyson Fountaine, Angela Wells | Disney+ |
| 2025 (77th) | A Nonsense Christmas with Sabrina Carpenter | | Diana Oh, Vanessa Dionne, Alicia Carbajal, Ashley Joy Beck, Carolina Gonzalez | Netflix |
| 2025 (77th) | RuPaul's Drag Race | "Bitch, I'm a Drag Queen!" | Natasha Marcelina, David Petruschin, Jen Fregozo, Nicole Faulkner | MTV |
2026 (78th)
| 2026 (78th) | Dancing with the Stars | "Disney Night" | Julie Socash, Angela Moos, Brian Sipe, Vance Hartwell, Josh Foster, Alison Gladieux, Sarah Benjamin Hall, Donna Bard | ABC |
| 2026 (78th) | The Oscars | | Bruce Grayson, Brielle McKenna, Rochelle Uribe, Julie Hassett, Jeong-Hwa Kim Fonkalsrud, Schuron Womack, Jill Cady, Michelle deMilt | ABC |
| 2026 (78th) | Saturday Night Live | "Host: Bad Bunny" | Louie Zakarian, Jason Milani, Amy Tagliamonti, Young Bek, Joanna Pisani, Madison Bermudez, Waltaya Culmer | NBC |

== Programs with multiple wins ==
10 wins

- Saturday Night Live

2 wins

- Dancing with the Stars

== Programs with multiple nominations ==
Total include nominations for Outstanding Makeup for a Series.

18 nominations

- Dancing with the Stars
- Saturday Night Live

10 nominations

- MADtv

7 nominations

- RuPaul's Drag Race

6 nominations

- So You Think You Can Dance
- The Voice

4 nominations

- Key & Peele

3 nominations

- How I Met Your Mother

2 nominations

- The Boulet Brothers' Dragula
- Legendary
- We're Here
