= The Final Three, Hunty =

2013 episode of RuPaul's Drag Race

- RuPaul's Drag Race episode
- Episode no.: Season 5 Episode 12
- Directed by: Nick Murray
- Presented by: RuPaul
- Original air date: April 22, 2013

Guest appearances
- Gloria Allred; Mathu Andersen; Candis Cayne

Episode chronology
| ← Previous "Sugar Ball" | Next → "Countdown to the Crown" |
- RuPaul's Drag Race season 5

"The Final Three, Hunty" is the twelfth episode of the fifth season of the American television series RuPaul's Drag Race. It was directed by Nick Murray and originally aired on April 22, 2013. The episode's main challenge tasks the contestants with performing in a music video to RuPaul's song "The Beginning" and acting in a courtroom scene. American attorney Gloria Allred, Australian artist and director Mathu Andersen, and American actress Candis Cayne are special guests. All three finalists face off in a lip-sync contest, but the winner is not announced until the season finale.

== Episode ==
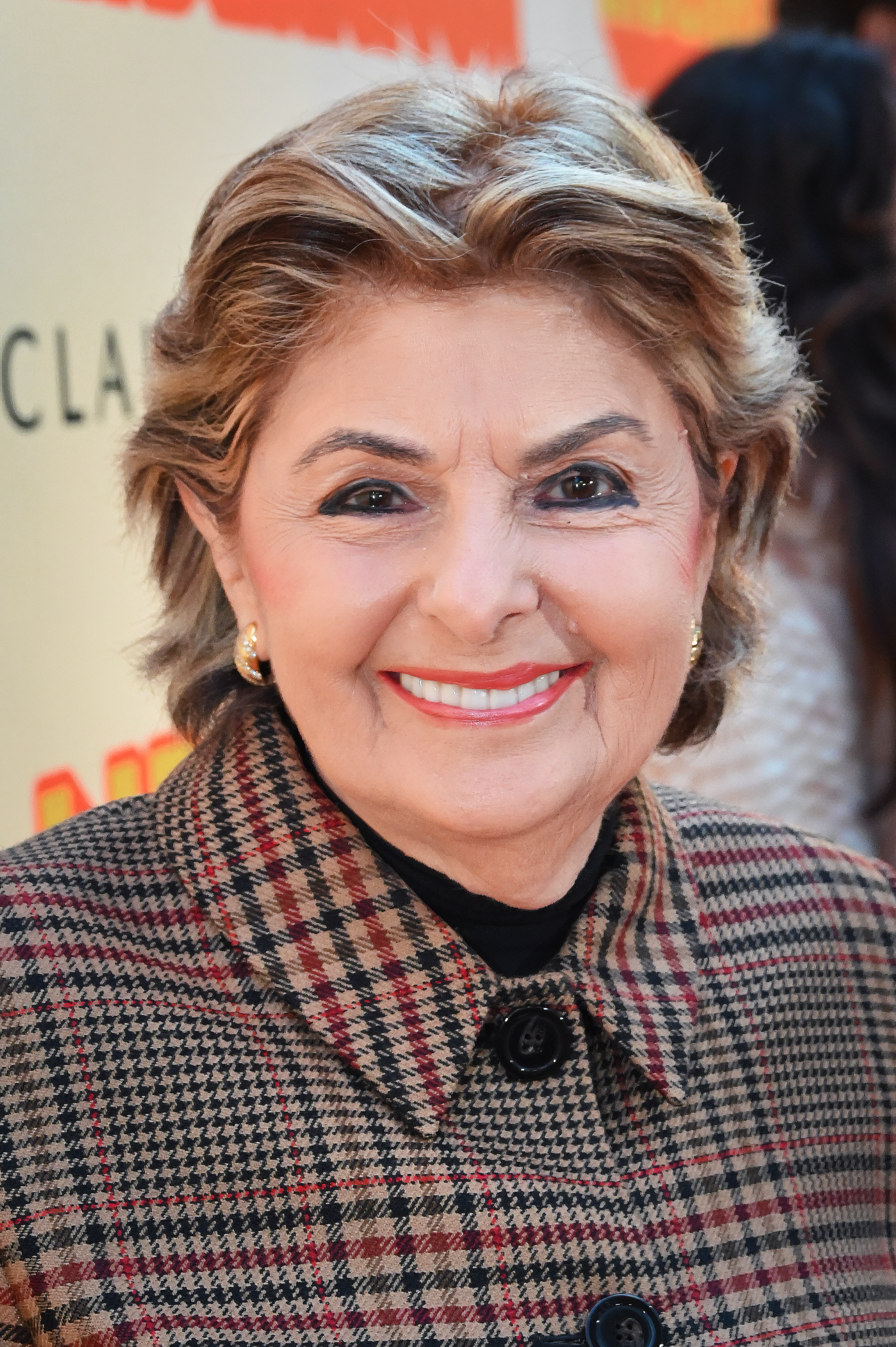
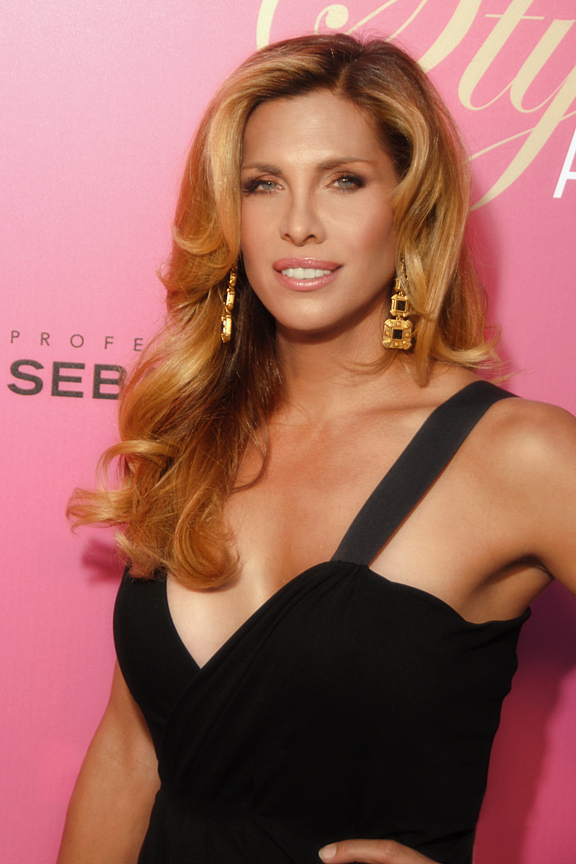
Gloria Allred (top, pictured in 2025) and Candis Cayne (bottom, pictured in 2009) are special guests.

The contestants return to the workroom after Detox's elimination on the previous episode. On a new day, Michelle Visage greets the group and reveals the season's final main challenge, which tasks the contestants with staring in a music video for RuPaul's song "The Beginning" and acting in a courtroom scene. Candis Cayne will assist with choreography and Mathu Andersen will direct the music video. Visage also reveals that each contestants will meet with RuPaul as well as guest Gloria Allred.

Cayne coaches the contestants in the workroom. The contestants then film the music video in front of a green screen, with Andersen and Cayne assisting. Each contestant meets with Allred and RuPaul, both of who ask questions and offer advice. The contestants then film courtroom scenes with Andersen. RuPaul plays Judge Rudy. Back in the workroom, the contestants get out of drag. Roxxxy Andrews expresses her frustrations with the competition and her perceived emphasis on comedic performance.

On elimination day, the contestants make final preparations in the workroom for the fashion show. The group continue to discuss the intersection of comedy and drag. The contestants talk about their favorite moments of the competition. Roxxxy Andrews says seeing Jinkx Monsoon in the bottom was a favorite, upsetting Jinkx Monsoon. On the main stage, RuPaul welcomes fellow judges Visage and Santino Rice. RuPaul shares the assignment of the main challenge and fashion show ("best drag"), then the contestants present their looks.

The judges watch the courtroom scenes, then deliver their critiques. RuPaul asks all three contestants to deliver their closing arguments, articulating why they should be crowned the season's winner. The judges deliberate, then share the results with the contestants. All three finalists face off in a lip-sync contest to "The Beginning". RuPaul says the winner will be announced at the finale and invites viewers to share their preferred winner via social media.

== Production and broadcast ==
The episode originally aired on April 22, 2013.

Salon.com wrote about the appeal for viewer feedback on social media.

=== Fashion ===
In the music video, Alaska wears a red outfit with matching high-heeled shoes and a red afro. Jinkx Monsoon has a yellow dress, a dark wig, and a headband. Roxxxy Andrews wears an orange outfit with blue high-heels.

For the main stage, RuPaul wears a red dress, hoop earrings, and a blonde wig. For the fashion show, Roxxxy Andrews has a green dress, large earrings, and a wig that is both blonde and dark. Jinkx Monsoon wears a purple dress, a headband, and a blonde wig. Alaska has a lace dress a large blonde wig.

== Reception ==
Oliver Sava of The A.V. Club gave the episode a rating of 'B+'. Sam Brooks ranked the lip-sync contest number 50 in The Spinoff's 2019 "definitive ranking" of the show's 162 lip-syncs to date.
