= Born Naked =

Studio album by RuPaul
- Released: February 24, 2014
- Recorded: 2013
- Genres: Dance; electronic; bounce; house
- Length: 38:15
- Label: RuCo Inc.
- Producer: Lucian Piane

RuPaul chronology
RuPaul Presents: The CoverGurlz (2014)	Born Naked (2014)	RuPaul Presents: CoverGurlz 2 (2015)

Singles from Born Naked
- 1. "Geronimo" Released: February 27, 2014; 2. "Sissy That Walk" Released: May 5, 2014; 3. "Modern Love" Released: May 18, 2015; 4. "Born Naked" Released: May 27, 2015

Born Naked is the seventh studio album from American singer-songwriter, actor and drag queen RuPaul. It was released on iTunes and Amazon through RuCo on February 24, 2014, coinciding with the sixth season premiere of RuPaul's Drag Race. The album is RuPaul's highest charting to date, reaching 4th position on US Billboard's Dance/Electronic Albums list. The album is a mix of electronic, bounce, rock and gospel tunes.

== Chart performance ==
Born Naked debuted at number 85 on the Billboard 200, selling 4,000 copies for the week ending March 2, 2014. It is RuPaul's highest charting album to date, as well as his first entry on the chart since his debut album, Supermodel of the World, peaked at number 109 in 1993. The album also debuted at number four on the Billboard Dance/Electronic Albums chart, another career high, and at number 18 on the Billboard Independent Albums chart, RuPaul's first appearance on the chart. Notably, Born Naked also reached number one on the iTunes Top Dance Albums chart in the US, also charting at number 23 on the store's Top albums chart.

== Track listing ==
Credits adapted from ASCAP and SESAC.

Standard track listing
No.	Title	Writer(s)	Producer(s)	Length
1.	"Freaky Money" (featuring Big Freedia)	RuPaul Charles; Lucian Piane; Freddie Ross, Jr.	Lucian Piane	3:03
2.	"Sissy That Walk"	Charles; Piane	Piane	3:32
3.	"Geronimo" (featuring Lucian Piane)	Charles; Piane	Piane	3:42
4.	"Dance with U"	Charles; Piane	Piane	3:52
5.	"Adrenaline" (featuring Myah Marie)	Charles; Piane	Piane	4:32
6.	"Can I Get an Amen" (featuring Martha Wash)	Charles; Piane	Piane	3:28
7.	"Fly Tonight" (featuring Frankmusik)	Charles; Piane	Piane	4:08
8.	"Modern Love"	Charles; Piane	Piane	4:49
9.	"Let the Music Play" (featuring Michelle Visage)	Charles; Piane	Piane	3:46
10.	"Born Naked" (featuring Clairy Browne)	Charles; Piane	Piane	3:23
Total length:				38:15

iTunes deluxe edition bonus tracks
No.	Title	Writer(s)	Producer(s)	Length
11.	"Feel Like Dancin'" (featuring La Toya Jackson)	Charles; Piane; La Toya Jackson	Piane	2:45
12.	"Dance with U" (René Dif Remix)	Charles; Piane	Piane; René Dif^{[a]}	4:35
13.	"Feel Like Dancin'" (Matt Pop Remix) (featuring La Toya Jackson)	Charles; Piane; Jackson	Piane; Matt Pop^{[a]}	3:54
14.	"Can I Get an Amen" (Revolucian Remix) (featuring Martha Wash)	Charles; Piane	Piane^{[b]}	3:28
15.	"Feel Like Dancin'" (Doot Doot Redo) (featuring La Toya Jackson)	Charles; Piane; Jackson	Piane; Jared Jones^{[a]}	3:18
16.	"Feel Like Dancin'" (Jared Jones Remix) (featuring La Toya Jackson)	Charles; Piane; Jackson	Piane; Jones^{[a]}	3:12
Total length:				59:27

=== Notes ===
- ^{^a} signifies remix engineer and additional producer
- ^{^b} signifies original producer in addition to remix engineer and additional producer

== Charts ==
Chart (2014)	Peak position
US Billboard 200	85
US Independent Albums (Billboard)	18
US Top Dance Albums (Billboard)	4

== Release history ==
Region	Date	Label	Format	Edition
Various	February 24, 2014	RuCo Inc.	Digital download	Standard
Various	May 5, 2014	RuCo Inc.	Digital download	Deluxe
