= Prancing Queens =

- RuPaul's Drag Race episode
- Episode no.: Season 7 Episode 10
- Directed by: Nick Murray
- Presented by: RuPaul

Guest appearances
- Rachael Harris (guest judge); Alyssa Milano (guest judge); Kym Herjavec

Episode chronology
| ← Previous "Divine Inspiration" | Next → "Hello, Kitty Girls!" |

"Prancing Queens" is the tenth episode of the seventh season of the American television series RuPaul's Drag Race. It originally aired on May 4, 2015. The episode's main challenge tasks the contestants with performing choreography in pairs to "mash-ups" of different dance styles. Rachael Harris and Alyssa Milano are guest judges, and dancer Kym Johnson also makes a guest appearance to assist the contestants with choreography. The episode was directed by Nick Murray. Katya and Violet Chachki win the main challenge. Trixie Mattel is eliminated from the competition after placing in the bottom and losing a lip-sync contest against Ginger Minj to "Show Me Love" (1990) by Robin S.

== Episode ==
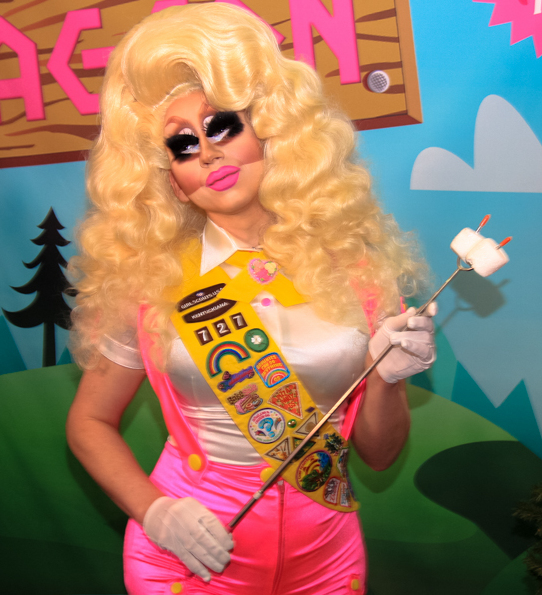
Trixie Mattel (pictured in 2018) is eliminated from the competition.

The contestants return to the workroom after Miss Fame's elimination on the previous episode. On a new day, the contestants read notes left by Miss Fame. RuPaul greets the group and reveals the mini-challenge, which tasks the contestants with serving "rich bitch reality realness" and acting in the Fake Housewives of RuPaul's Drag Race, a parody of the Real Housewives franchise. Violet Chachki wins the mini-challenge.

RuPaul then reveals the main challenge, which tasks the contestants with performing choreography in pairs to "mash-ups" of different dance styles, wearing "half man and half drag queen" drag. As the winner of the mini-challenge, Violet Chachki must assign the pairs for the main challenge. The teams are Ginger Minj and Trixie Mattel with country and the robot, Katya and Violet Chachki with tango and vogue, and Kennedy Davenport and Pearl with the charleston and twerking. The pairs begin to practice in the workroom. RuPaul returns to meet with each pair, asking questions and offering advice. The pairs rehearse with dancer Kym Johnson and Carson Kressley.

On elimination day, the contestants make final preparations in the workroom for the fashion show and performances. On the main stage, RuPaul welcomes fellow judges Michelle Visage and Kressley, as well as guest judges Rachael Harris and Alyssa Milano. RuPaul shares the assignment, then the fashion show commences. The pairs perform the dances for the judges. The judges deliver their critiques, deliberate, then share the results with the group. Katya and Violet Chachki are declared the winners of the main challenge. Ginger Minj and Trixie Mattel place in the bottom two and face off in a lip-sync contest to "Show Me Love" (1990) by Robin S. Ginger Minj wins the lip-sync and Trixie Mattel is eliminated from the competition.

== Production ==
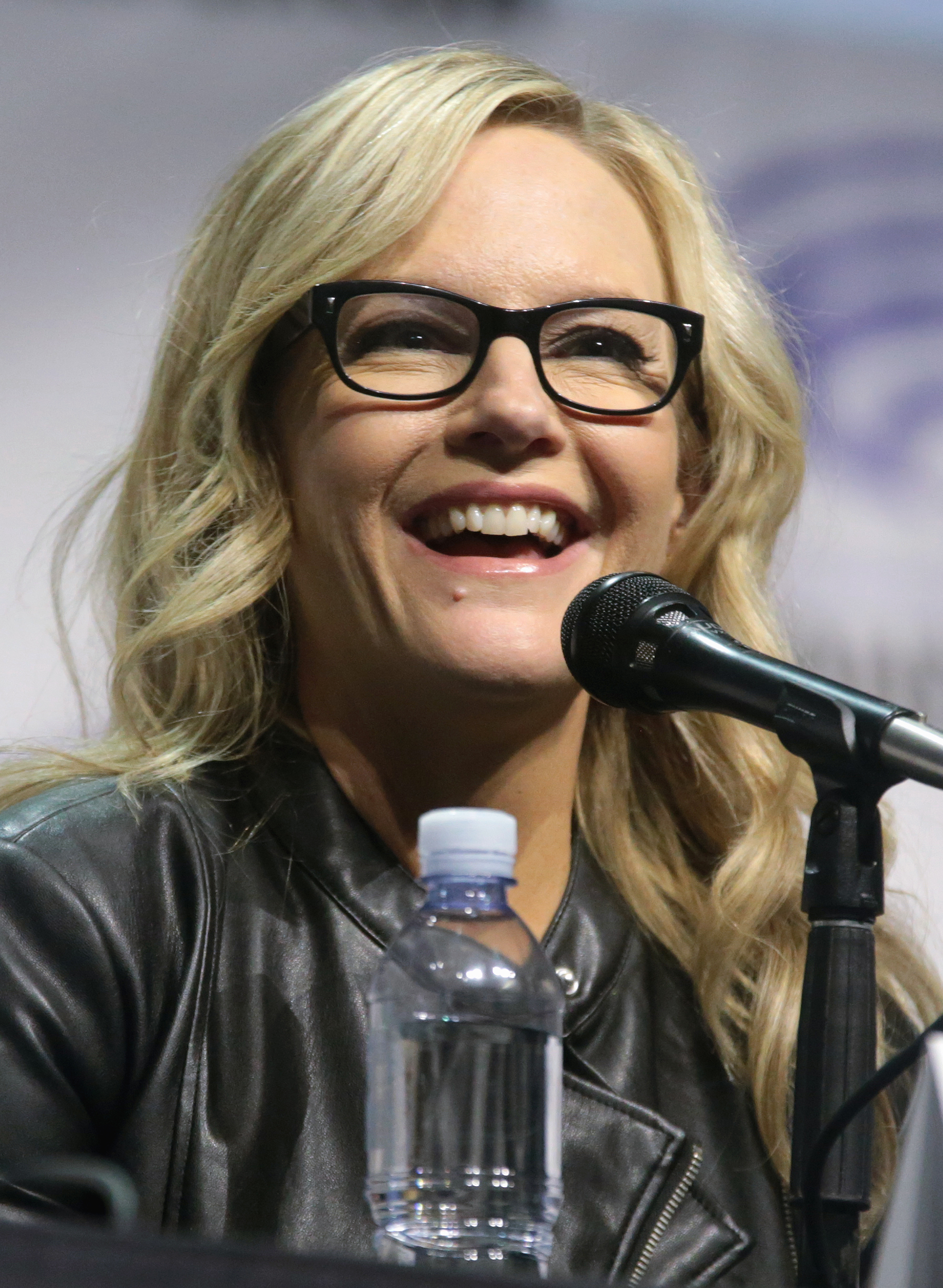
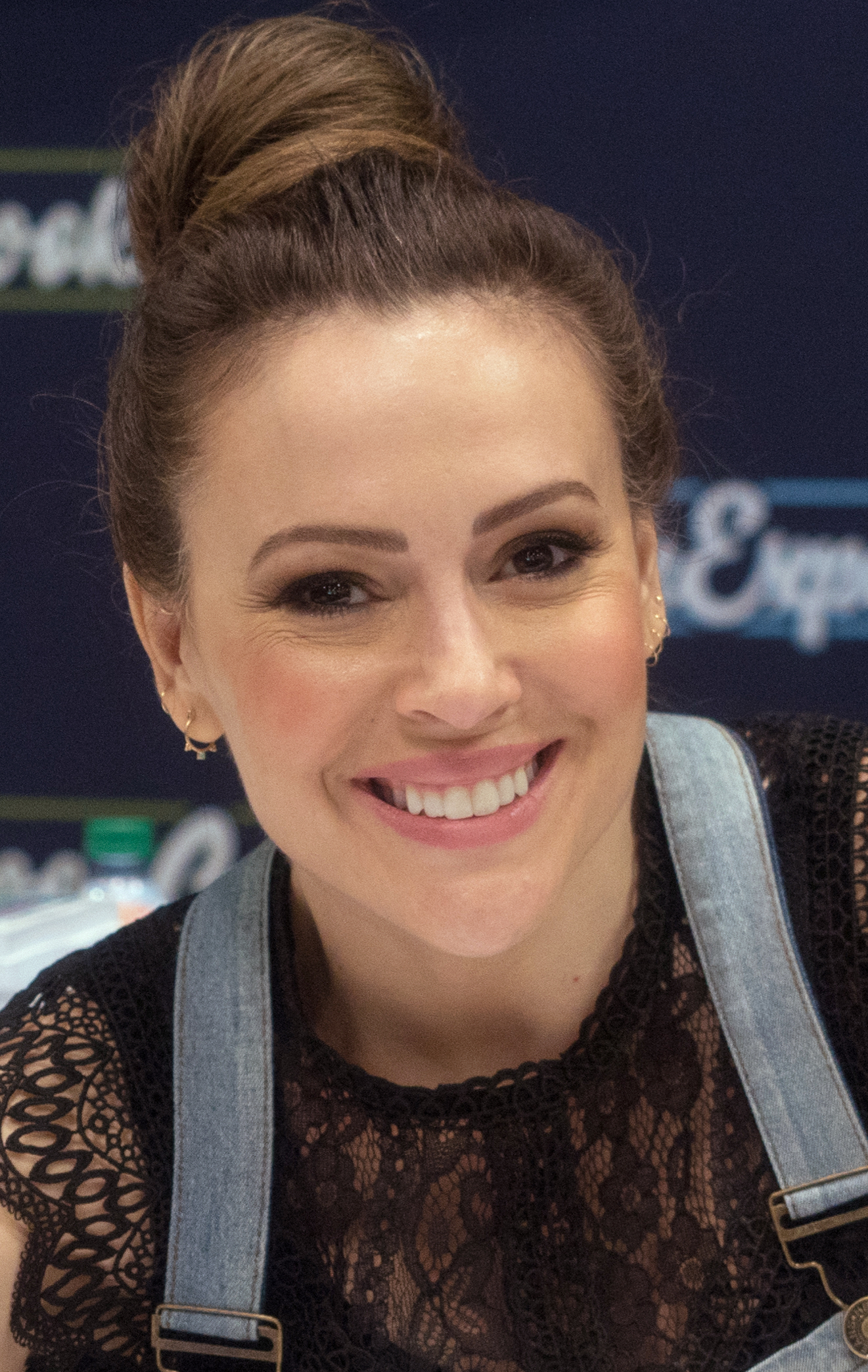
Rachael Harris (left, pictured in 2017) and Alyssa Milano (right, pictured in 2019) are guest judges.

The episode originally aired on May 4, 2015.

=== Fashion ===
For the fashion show, all of the contestants present an outfit, half of which is a black-and-white suit, plus distinct other halves. Pearl's other half is a red dress. Kennedy Davenport's other half is a pink dress. Trixie Mattel's other half is a short white dress and she wears a cowboy hat. Ginger Minj's other half is a short denim dress with green fringe. Violet Chachki's other half is a red dress and she wears a red headpiece. Katya's other half is a flapper.

== Reception ==
Oliver Sava of The A.V. Club gave the episode a rating of 'B'. Kevin O'Keeffe ranked the "Show Me Love" performance number 77 in INTO Magazine's 2018 "definitive ranking" of the show's lip-sync contests to date. Sam Brooks ranked "Show Me Love" number 45 in The Spinoff's 2019 "definitive ranking" of the show's 162 lip-syncs to date. Brooks wrote, "This is a great performance, but I've knocked it a few points because 'Show Me Love' is one of the top five songs of the 90s, one of the best club songs ever, and imagine what the right queens could do with this song. It'd be a top five lip-sync for sure. But neither Ginger nor Trixie quite nail it, so it's here." Jason Mecchi included the dance challenge in Screen Rant's 2021 overview of the show's ten most difficult main (or "maxi") challenges to date.
