= Sweet Tea (disambiguation) =

Sweet tea is a style of iced tea.

Sweet Tea may also refer to:

- Sweet Tea Recording Studio, a studio in Mississippi
- Sweet Tea (album), a 2001 album by Buddy Guy named after the studio
- Sweet Tea: Black Gay Men of the South—An Oral History, a 2008 ethnographic book by E. Patrick Johnson

== See also ==
- Sweet Tee, an American rapper who recorded in the 1980s and 90s
- Matt Bloom, an American wrestler who has had the nickname "Sweet T"
- Sweet T (album), an album by Ginger Minj
