= YPZ =

YPZ can refer to:

- Burns Lake Airport
- Young Poale Zion
- Yekaterina Petronva Zamolodchikova
