= Jacques Cabaret =

Gay bar in Boston, Massachusetts, United States

Coordinates: 42.34999°N 71.06745°W

Jacques Cabaret in 2026

Jacques Cabaret (also stylized as Jacque's Cabaret) is the oldest continuously operating gay bar in Boston, Massachusetts. Located in the Bay Village neighborhood, it is known for its nightly drag shows and as the venue where drag performer Katya Zamolodchikova got her start hosting a monthly burlesque show, Perestroika.

== History ==
Nightclub operator Henry Vara opened the bar in 1938 under the name Jacques Restaurant. By the mid-1940s it had become a gay bar. In 1967 Vara opened The Other Side across the street, taking over the liquor license of the Punch Bowl, another gay bar that had closed down. Vara was a prolific nightclub owner, at one time holding the most liquor licenses in Boston; he was also the owner of the Kenmore Club in Boston, Studio 54 in New York City, and several more bars in other states. Jacques Cabaret has remained a family business throughout its history.

Through the years, Jacques has faced several threats to its existence. In 1965, city council member Frederick Langone proposed that the area be "revitalized" and the bars bulldozed, stating, “We will be better off without these incubators of homosexuality and indecency. ... We must uproot these joints so innocent kids won't be contaminated.”

During a stop on Boston's first gay pride march in 1971, LGBT activists such as Magora Kennedy demanded that the bar, as one of the only havens for gay women in Boston, provide better conditions for its patrons:

“Because we can't go anywhere else, because as gay women we have been especially ghettoized here in Boston, and because the conditions at gay bars are by and large determined by the straight world, those in control know they can be as oppressive as they want. Jacques is terribly crowded and a fire hazard on weekends. Women entering the bar were subject to taunts by [straight] men, who not only [took] up badly needed room but also got their kicks leering and propositioning the women here. Sanitary conditions hardly exist at all. We are effectively ghettoized, since dancing between members of the same sex and other behavior, which the law deems to call lewd and lascivious, are illegal.”

As the Bay Village neighborhood grew into an affluent residential area, residents complained of the noise and rowdy bar patrons. In the early 1970s, Jacques and The Other Side were the subjects of many police reports of prostitution, drugs, and violent crime in the area. The bars became a point of contention within the gay community. While some sympathized with the Bay Village residents and alleged that the bars attracted gay-bashers, others argued that opponents of the bars merely objected to the poor, gender-nonconforming, and "trashy" gay clientele, and that the police were in fact the source of violence in the area.

Following a number of police reports, in 1975, Henry Vara and Frank Cashman, the operators of Jacques and The Other Side, appeared in hearings of the licensing board. Facing threats to the bars' licenses, Cashman alleged under oath that Deputy Mayor Robert Kiley had attempted to solicit a $50,000 donation to Mayor Kevin White's campaign in exchange for using his political sway to ensure the licenses would remain intact, a claim which Kiley denied. The attorney general's office investigated the claim and declared it to be false.

In the protracted legal battle, the Boston licensing board ruled in 1975 that the bars would need to relocate or lose their liquor licenses, a decision that was overturned by the Massachusetts Alcoholic Beverages Control Commission (ABCC). The licensing board later ruled in 1976 that Jacques and The Other Side must move their closing hours from 2 a.m. to midnight. Jacques remained controversial among Bay Village residents well into the 2000s and 2010s.

== Culture and legacy ==
Jacques hosts multiple drag shows per week. Drag performer Katya Zamolodchikova began hosting the drag burlesque show Perestroika in 2006, which featured various drag queens each month. Other RuPaul's Drag Race alumnae who regularly performed at the bar include Jujubee, Sapphira Cristál, Plane Jane, Kori King and Briar Blush.

The bar's alternative drag show #NoFilter was listed as a 2018 Boston's Best winner by The Improper Bostonian. In addition to drag performances, Jacques Cabaret hosts parties, karaoke nights, comedy shows and open mic nights, talent shows, and musical acts.

Jacques Cabaret's motto is "All roads lead to Jacques."
