= Trixie and Katya =

American comedy duo

Trixie & Katya
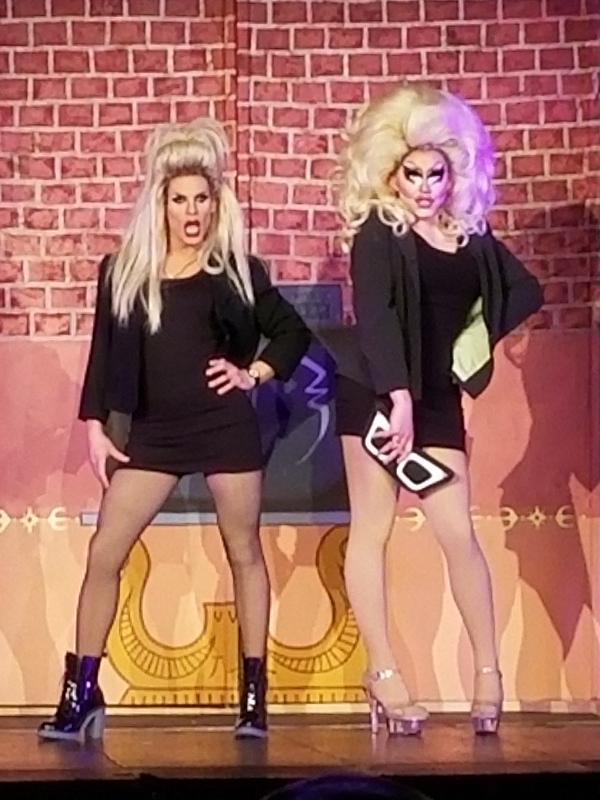
- Katya (left) and Trixie (right) performing in 2017
- Born: Brian Michael Firkus; August 23, 1989 (age 36): Milwaukee, Wisconsin, U.S.; Brian Joseph McCook; May 1, 1982 (age 44); Boston, Massachusetts, U.S.
- Occupations: Drag queens; comedians; actors; musicians
- Years active: 2015–present

YouTube information
- Channel: Trixie & Katya
- Genre: Comedy
- Subscribers: 770 thousand
- Views: 144 million
- Last updated: February 22, 2026
- Website: trixieandkatya.com

Trixie and Katya is a comedy duo consisting of drag queens Trixie Mattel (Brian Firkus) and Katya Zamolodchikova (Brian McCook). The two have been known for their individual careers as entertainers and often as a popular double act. They first met as contestants on the seventh season of RuPaul's Drag Race and quickly became audience favourites, developing an even larger audience as they began to appear together in December 2015 on YouTube.

== Style and performance ==
The comedic style of Trixie and Katya developed through the filming of their webseries UNHhhh and is often based around drag and improvisational comedy. The pair have also acted together on live stage productions and feature as a double act in a variety of drag performances including a stage production drag remake of cult film Romy and Michele's High School Reunion titled Trixie and Katya's High School Reunion as well as a live show in Las Vegas in 2019. Their comedy often plays on the contrast between the two drag queens, with Trixie being a self-described workaholic and entrepreneur, and Katya having a much more chaotic and carefree personality which is often the catalyst for the absurdist humor that many of their conversations develop into. The two often make fun of LGBT stereotypes as well as popular culture. In their live shows they often incorporate music from their own individual careers as well as a variety of sketches, improvisation and dance choreographed by Laganja Estranja.

Trixie and Katya often credit their editors Christopher Smith, Ron Hill and Jeff Maccubbin for much of the success of UNHhhh, citing that their style of editing is an important part of the comedy style of the show.

== Web series and TV ==
The two first appeared together on the seventh season of RuPaul's Drag Race first aired on March 2, 2015, although not as a duo but as individual contestants on the show. They first appeared as a double act on World of Wonder's YouTube channel on December 31, 2015 as guest hosts of the web series Fashion Photo RuView, usually hosted by fellow drag queens Raja and Raven. The positive reception for that episode resulted in World of Wonder launching UNHhhh, a comedy web series featuring the duo. The series became one of the most successful shows on the WOW Presents YouTube channel and earned them their first Streamy Award nomination for Show of the Year at the 7th Streamy Awards.

In November 2017, Trixie and Katya's web series was suspended after its second season and the two started The Trixie & Katya Show on the TV network Viceland. The show was similar to UNHhhh but its format was adapted for a television audience. The Trixie & Katya Show was cancelled after one season and the series returned to YouTube for its third season in October 2018. On 21 April 2021, UNHhhh debuted its sixth season.

In November 2019, Trixie and Katya began starring in I Like to Watch, a comedy web series produced and streamed by Netflix on its YouTube channel.

On December 12, 2020 Trixie and Katya hosted the 10th Streamy Awards. To adhere to social distancing restrictions, the duo presented the awards by driving a party bus around Los Angeles. On May 27, 2021, the two announced the launch of their own YouTube channel which also features a video version of their podcast.

In September 2025, during an episode of Wild Wild Web Pod, Katya revealed that the duo would no longer be returning for another season of UNHhhh.

== Books, podcast and newsletter ==
On July 14, 2020, Trixie and Katya released their book Trixie and Katya's Guide to Modern Womanhood, which is also available as an audiobook read by the authors. The book is a mixture of self-help and comedy. On April 8, 2022 Penguin announced that Trixie and Katya's second book in a similar vein to the first, Working Girls: Trixie & Katya's Guide to Professional Womanhood, would be released on October 25, 2022.

On October 6, 2020 the duo premiered a new podcast called The Bald and the Beautiful. The show features various guests who often join Trixie and Katya in their conversations. As of June 2021 it became available as a video podcast as well as audio.

On August 18, 2021 Trixie and Katya released Gooped, a humorous lifestyle newsletter and blog on the online platform Substack.

== Tours and live shows ==
On July 7, 2021 the duo announced their first US tour together called Trixie and Katya LIVE. On May 27, 2022 they released tickets for a European leg of the tour scheduled for November and December 2022. The two were accompanied in their tour performances by fellow drag queen Kelly Mantle.

== Awards and nominations ==
=== Queerty Awards ===
Year	Award	Nominated work	Result	Ref.
2021	Podcast	The Bald and the Beautiful	Won	
2022	Podcast	The Bald and the Beautiful	Runner-up	
2023	Best Read	Working Girls: Trixie and Katya's Guide to Professional Womanhood	Won	
2024	Web Series	UNHhhh	Runner-up	

=== Streamy Awards ===
Year	Award	Nominated work	Result	Ref.
2017	Show of the Year	UNHhhh	Nominated	
2019	Unscripted Series	UNHhhh	Nominated	
2020	Unscripted Series	UNHhhh	Won	
2020	Show of the Year	UNHhhh	Nominated	
2021	Show of the Year	UNHhhh	Nominated	
2021	Unscripted Series	UNHhhh	Nominated	
2022	Unscripted Series	UNHhhh	Nominated	
2022	Editing	UNHhhh	Nominated	
2022	Show of the Year	UNHhhh	Nominated	
2023	Show of the Year	UNHhhh	Nominated	

=== Webby Awards ===
Year	Award	Nominated work	Result	Ref.
Webby Awards
2022	Podcasts, Best Podcast Ad	The Bald and the Beautiful	Won	
2023	Social, Television & Film (Video)	I Like to Watch	Won	
2024	Social, Television & Film	I Like to Watch	Won	
2024	Podcasts, Comedy	The Bald and the Beautiful	Won	
2025	Podcasts, Comedy	The Bald and the Beautiful	Won	
People's Voice
2022	Podcasts, Best Podcast Ad	The Bald and the Beautiful with Trixie and Katya	Won	
2022	Social, Arts & Entertainment (Video)	I Like To Watch	Won	
2023	Social, Television & Film (Video)	I Like To Watch	Won	

=== Miscellaneous awards and honors ===
Year	Organization	Award	Nominated work	Result	Ref.
2021	Canadian Podcast Awards	Outstanding Foreign Series	The Bald and the Beautiful	Won	
2023	Signal Awards	Best Video Podcast	The Bald and the Beautiful	Bronze	
2023	Signal Awards	Best Co-Host Team	The Bald and the Beautiful	Gold	
2023	Signal Awards	Best "Stan" Podcast	The Bald and the Beautiful	Silver	
2023	Signal Awards	Best LGBTQ+ Podcast	The Bald and the Beautiful	Silver	
2023	Shorty Awards	Comedy Podcast	The Bald and the Beautiful	Audience Honor	
2023	GLAAD Media Awards	Outstanding Podcast	The Bald and the Beautiful	Nominated	
2026	GLAAD Media Awards	Outstanding Podcast	The Bald and the Beautiful	Pending	
