= Trixie and Katya's Guide to Modern Womanhood =

2020 book

- First edition (publ. Plume Books)
- Author: Trixie and Katya
- Published: Plume Books
- Publication date: 2020

Trixie and Katya's Guide to Modern Womanhood is a 2020 book by drag queens Trixie and Katya, published by Plume Books, an imprint of Penguin Group. It was published in the UK and Australia by Penguin's Ebury Publishing imprint. It is a parody of self-help and etiquette books for women. It includes both serious and satirical advice on housekeeping, fashion and relationships.

== Background ==
Katya Zamolodchikova is the drag name of Brian McCook, a Boston drag queen, who competed on RuPaul's Drag Race season seven, alongside Brian Firkus, who performs professionally as Trixie Mattel. The pair are long time collaborators, and have worked together in podcasts, and their YouTube show for World of Wonder, UNHhhh. After being pitched the idea for the book by their agent, they were inspired by etiquette books that Trixie had read, and self-help books that Katya had tried during her struggle with drug addiction. The book aims to make fun of the "ridiculousness of human identity in the modern world", which is why they choose to write a self-help book.

== Content ==
The book is dedicated to "All ambitious female scientists out there." Photography was done by Gabriel D Gastelum, Joel Benjamin and Albert Sanchez, and creative direction by Pedro Zalba. It includes full page spreads of the authors in drag, and chapters on homemaking (including money, social media, interior design and food), relationships, beauty (including shoes, hygiene, drugs, self-love, makeup and hair). It also includes transcribed conversations between Trixie and Katya.

== Reception ==
The book reached #2 on the New York Times Bestseller List self-help category in July and remained on the list for two weeks. It debuted at #6 on Publishers Weekly's nonfiction hardcover bestsellers.

Bleeding Cool said it "makes a great read and an even greater present, for when you need to tell someone, "Mary, learn to take care of yourself, girl." in the most passive-aggressive way possible." The A.V. Club's Shannon Miller rated it highly, and said "there is no part of this breezy read that isn't thoroughly engaging."

== Sequel ==
On April 8, 2022, Penguin announced that Trixie and Katya's second book in a similar vein to the first, Working Girls: Trixie & Katya's Guide to Professional Womanhood, would be released on October 25, 2022. The book will include "advice for people entering the modern workplace, including satirical tips for choosing a career path, navigating the 'Nine Circles of Retail Hell,' corporate culture, grappling with suspicions that your colleague 'doesn't really hope their emails finds you well,' and the inevitable sailing into one's retiree era." as well as quizzes and an aptitude test.
