= Haters Roast =

Drag comedy tour

The Haters Roast is a drag comedy tour featuring RuPaul's Drag Race contestants, organized by Murray & Peter Present. Tour performances consist of the rotating cast of drag queens "reading", or playfully insulting, their fellow castmates, celebrities and peers. One member of the cast usually plays the role of host, introducing the performers each night.

In March 2019, Trinity the Tuck left the tour as a sign of solidarity after Monét X Change was removed for missing a stop to participate in the music video for Madonna's "God Control".

== Tour dates ==
Date	City	Country	Host	Performers
2017 leg
March 23, 2017	San Diego	United States	Ginger Minj	Acid Betty; Alaska Thunderfuck; Bob the Drag Queen; Cynthia Lee Fontaine; Darienne Lake; Ginger Minj; Jinkx Monsoon; Kim Chi; Latrice Royale; Phi Phi O'Hara; Trixie Mattel
March 24, 2017	San Francisco	United States	Ginger Minj	Acid Betty; Alaska Thunderfuck; Bob the Drag Queen; Cynthia Lee Fontaine; Darienne Lake; Ginger Minj; Jinkx Monsoon; Kim Chi; Latrice Royale; Phi Phi O'Hara; Trixie Mattel
March 25, 2017	Portland	United States	Ginger Minj	Acid Betty; Alaska Thunderfuck; Bob the Drag Queen; Cynthia Lee Fontaine; Darienne Lake; Ginger Minj; Jinkx Monsoon; Kim Chi; Latrice Royale; Phi Phi O'Hara; Trixie Mattel
March 26, 2017	Seattle	United States	Ginger Minj	Acid Betty; Alaska Thunderfuck; Bob the Drag Queen; Cynthia Lee Fontaine; Darienne Lake; Ginger Minj; Jinkx Monsoon; Kim Chi; Latrice Royale; Phi Phi O'Hara; Trixie Mattel
March 30, 2017	Houston	United States	Ginger Minj	Acid Betty; Alaska Thunderfuck; Bob the Drag Queen; Cynthia Lee Fontaine; Darienne Lake; Ginger Minj; Jinkx Monsoon; Kim Chi; Latrice Royale; Phi Phi O'Hara; Trixie Mattel
March 31, 2017	Dallas	United States	Ginger Minj	Acid Betty; Alaska Thunderfuck; Bob the Drag Queen; Cynthia Lee Fontaine; Darienne Lake; Ginger Minj; Jinkx Monsoon; Kim Chi; Latrice Royale; Phi Phi O'Hara; Trixie Mattel
April 1, 2017	Washington, D.C.	United States	Ginger Minj	Acid Betty; Alaska Thunderfuck; Bob the Drag Queen; Cynthia Lee Fontaine; Darienne Lake; Ginger Minj; Jinkx Monsoon; Kim Chi; Latrice Royale; Phi Phi O'Hara; Trixie Mattel
April 13, 2017	Minneapolis	United States	Ginger Minj	Acid Betty; Alaska Thunderfuck; Bob the Drag Queen; Cynthia Lee Fontaine; Darienne Lake; Ginger Minj; Jinkx Monsoon; Kim Chi; Latrice Royale; Phi Phi O'Hara; Trixie Mattel
April 14, 2017	Boston	United States	Ginger Minj	Acid Betty; Alaska Thunderfuck; Bob the Drag Queen; Cynthia Lee Fontaine; Darienne Lake; Ginger Minj; Jinkx Monsoon; Kim Chi; Latrice Royale; Phi Phi O'Hara; Trixie Mattel
April 15, 2017	Nashville	United States	Ginger Minj	Acid Betty; Alaska Thunderfuck; Bob the Drag Queen; Cynthia Lee Fontaine; Darienne Lake; Ginger Minj; Jinkx Monsoon; Kim Chi; Latrice Royale; Phi Phi O'Hara; Trixie Mattel
April 20, 2017	Phoenix	United States	Ginger Minj	Acid Betty; Alaska Thunderfuck; Bob the Drag Queen; Cynthia Lee Fontaine; Darienne Lake; Ginger Minj; Jinkx Monsoon; Kim Chi; Latrice Royale; Phi Phi O'Hara; Trixie Mattel
April 21, 2017	Cleveland	United States	Ginger Minj	Acid Betty; Alaska Thunderfuck; Bob the Drag Queen; Cynthia Lee Fontaine; Darienne Lake; Ginger Minj; Jinkx Monsoon; Kim Chi; Latrice Royale; Phi Phi O'Hara; Trixie Mattel
April 22, 2017	Philadelphia	United States	Ginger Minj	Acid Betty; Alaska Thunderfuck; Bob the Drag Queen; Cynthia Lee Fontaine; Darienne Lake; Ginger Minj; Jinkx Monsoon; Kim Chi; Latrice Royale; Phi Phi O'Hara; Trixie Mattel
April 23, 2017	Buffalo	United States	Ginger Minj	Acid Betty; Alaska Thunderfuck; Bob the Drag Queen; Cynthia Lee Fontaine; Darienne Lake; Ginger Minj; Jinkx Monsoon; Kim Chi; Latrice Royale; Phi Phi O'Hara; Trixie Mattel
May 8, 2017	Durham	United States	Ginger Minj	Acid Betty; Alaska Thunderfuck; Bob the Drag Queen; Cynthia Lee Fontaine; Darienne Lake; Ginger Minj; Jinkx Monsoon; Kim Chi; Latrice Royale; Phi Phi O'Hara; Trixie Mattel
May 9, 2017	Indianapolis	United States	Ginger Minj	Acid Betty; Alaska Thunderfuck; Bob the Drag Queen; Cynthia Lee Fontaine; Darienne Lake; Ginger Minj; Jinkx Monsoon; Kim Chi; Latrice Royale; Phi Phi O'Hara; Trixie Mattel
May 10, 2017	Atlanta	United States	Ginger Minj	Acid Betty; Alaska Thunderfuck; Bob the Drag Queen; Cynthia Lee Fontaine; Darienne Lake; Ginger Minj; Jinkx Monsoon; Kim Chi; Latrice Royale; Phi Phi O'Hara; Trixie Mattel
May 11, 2017	Ft. Lauderdale	United States	Ginger Minj	Acid Betty; Alaska Thunderfuck; Bob the Drag Queen; Cynthia Lee Fontaine; Darienne Lake; Ginger Minj; Jinkx Monsoon; Kim Chi; Latrice Royale; Phi Phi O'Hara; Trixie Mattel
2018 leg
February 16, 2018	Miami Beach	United States	Ginger Minj	Aja; Derrick Barry; Eureka O'Hara; Ginger Minj; Jinkx Monsoon; Latrice Royale; Thorgy Thor; Trinity the Tuck; Trixie Mattel; Willam
February 17, 2018	Tampa	United States	Ginger Minj	Aja; Derrick Barry; Eureka O'Hara; Ginger Minj; Jinkx Monsoon; Latrice Royale; Thorgy Thor; Trinity the Tuck; Trixie Mattel; Willam
February 18, 2018	Atlanta	United States	Ginger Minj	Aja; Derrick Barry; Eureka O'Hara; Ginger Minj; Jinkx Monsoon; Latrice Royale; Thorgy Thor; Trinity the Tuck; Trixie Mattel; Willam
February 23, 2018	Wichita	United States	Ginger Minj	Aja; Derrick Barry; Eureka O'Hara; Ginger Minj; Jinkx Monsoon; Latrice Royale; Thorgy Thor; Trinity the Tuck; Trixie Mattel; Willam
February 24, 2018	San Antonio	United States	Ginger Minj	Aja; Derrick Barry; Eureka O'Hara; Ginger Minj; Jinkx Monsoon; Latrice Royale; Thorgy Thor; Trinity the Tuck; Trixie Mattel; Willam
February 25, 2018	Dallas	United States	Ginger Minj	Aja; Derrick Barry; Eureka O'Hara; Ginger Minj; Jinkx Monsoon; Latrice Royale; Thorgy Thor; Trinity the Tuck; Trixie Mattel; Willam
February 28, 2018	Boise	United States	Ginger Minj	Aja; Derrick Barry; Eureka O'Hara; Ginger Minj; Jinkx Monsoon; Latrice Royale; Thorgy Thor; Trinity the Tuck; Trixie Mattel; Willam
March 1, 2018	Seattle	United States	Ginger Minj	Aja; Derrick Barry; Eureka O'Hara; Ginger Minj; Jinkx Monsoon; Latrice Royale; Thorgy Thor; Trinity the Tuck; Trixie Mattel; Willam
March 3, 2018	Anaheim	United States	Ginger Minj	Aja; Derrick Barry; Eureka O'Hara; Ginger Minj; Jinkx Monsoon; Latrice Royale; Thorgy Thor; Trinity the Tuck; Trixie Mattel; Willam
March 21, 2018	Munhall	United States	Ginger Minj	Aja; Derrick Barry; Eureka O'Hara; Ginger Minj; Jinkx Monsoon; Latrice Royale; Thorgy Thor; Trinity the Tuck; Trixie Mattel; Willam
March 22, 2018	Washington, D.C.	United States	Ginger Minj	Aja; Derrick Barry; Eureka O'Hara; Ginger Minj; Jinkx Monsoon; Latrice Royale; Thorgy Thor; Trinity the Tuck; Trixie Mattel; Willam
March 23, 2018	New York City	United States	Ginger Minj	Aja; Derrick Barry; Eureka O'Hara; Ginger Minj; Jinkx Monsoon; Latrice Royale; Thorgy Thor; Trinity the Tuck; Trixie Mattel; Willam
March 24, 2018	New Haven	United States	Ginger Minj	Aja; Derrick Barry; Eureka O'Hara; Ginger Minj; Jinkx Monsoon; Latrice Royale; Thorgy Thor; Trinity the Tuck; Trixie Mattel; Willam
March 28, 2018	Boston	United States	Ginger Minj	Aja; Derrick Barry; Eureka O'Hara; Ginger Minj; Jinkx Monsoon; Latrice Royale; Thorgy Thor; Trinity the Tuck; Trixie Mattel; Willam
March 29, 2018	Buffalo	United States	Ginger Minj	Aja; Derrick Barry; Eureka O'Hara; Ginger Minj; Jinkx Monsoon; Latrice Royale; Thorgy Thor; Trinity the Tuck; Trixie Mattel; Willam
March 30, 2018	Grand Rapids	United States	Ginger Minj	Aja; Derrick Barry; Eureka O'Hara; Ginger Minj; Jinkx Monsoon; Latrice Royale; Thorgy Thor; Trinity the Tuck; Trixie Mattel; Willam
March 31, 2018	Chicago	United States	Ginger Minj	Aja; Derrick Barry; Eureka O'Hara; Ginger Minj; Jinkx Monsoon; Latrice Royale; Thorgy Thor; Trinity the Tuck; Trixie Mattel; Willam
April 4, 2018	Denver	United States	Ginger Minj	Aja; Derrick Barry; Eureka O'Hara; Ginger Minj; Jinkx Monsoon; Latrice Royale; Thorgy Thor; Trinity the Tuck; Trixie Mattel; Willam
April 5, 2018	Albuquerque	United States	Ginger Minj	Aja; Derrick Barry; Eureka O'Hara; Ginger Minj; Jinkx Monsoon; Latrice Royale; Thorgy Thor; Trinity the Tuck; Trixie Mattel; Willam
April 7, 2018	Phoenix	United States	Ginger Minj	Aja; Derrick Barry; Eureka O'Hara; Ginger Minj; Jinkx Monsoon; Latrice Royale; Thorgy Thor; Trinity the Tuck; Trixie Mattel; Willam
April 8, 2018	San Diego	United States	Ginger Minj	Aja; Derrick Barry; Eureka O'Hara; Ginger Minj; Jinkx Monsoon; Latrice Royale; Thorgy Thor; Trinity the Tuck; Trixie Mattel; Willam
April 9, 2018	San Francisco	United States	Ginger Minj	Aja; Derrick Barry; Eureka O'Hara; Ginger Minj; Jinkx Monsoon; Latrice Royale; Thorgy Thor; Trinity the Tuck; Trixie Mattel; Willam
2019 leg
February 12, 2019	Winnipeg	Canada	Darienne Lake	Alyssa Edwards; BenDeLaCreme; Darienne Lake; Jinkx Monsoon; Lady Bunny; Latrice Royale; Manila Luzon; Miz Cracker; Monét X Change; Shea Couleé; Thorgy Thor; Trinity the Tuck; Vanessa Vanjie Mateo; Willam
February 13, 2019	Saskatoon	Canada	Darienne Lake	Alyssa Edwards; BenDeLaCreme; Darienne Lake; Jinkx Monsoon; Lady Bunny; Latrice Royale; Manila Luzon; Miz Cracker; Monét X Change; Shea Couleé; Thorgy Thor; Trinity the Tuck; Vanessa Vanjie Mateo; Willam
February 14, 2019	Edmonton	Canada	Darienne Lake	Alyssa Edwards; BenDeLaCreme; Darienne Lake; Jinkx Monsoon; Lady Bunny; Latrice Royale; Manila Luzon; Miz Cracker; Monét X Change; Shea Couleé; Thorgy Thor; Trinity the Tuck; Vanessa Vanjie Mateo; Willam
February 15, 2019	Calgary	Canada	Darienne Lake	Alyssa Edwards; BenDeLaCreme; Darienne Lake; Jinkx Monsoon; Lady Bunny; Latrice Royale; Manila Luzon; Miz Cracker; Monét X Change; Shea Couleé; Thorgy Thor; Trinity the Tuck; Vanessa Vanjie Mateo; Willam
February 17, 2019	Vancouver	Canada	Darienne Lake	Alyssa Edwards; BenDeLaCreme; Darienne Lake; Jinkx Monsoon; Lady Bunny; Latrice Royale; Manila Luzon; Miz Cracker; Monét X Change; Shea Couleé; Thorgy Thor; Trinity the Tuck; Vanessa Vanjie Mateo; Willam
February 18, 2019	Seattle	United States	Darienne Lake	Alyssa Edwards; BenDeLaCreme; Darienne Lake; Jinkx Monsoon; Lady Bunny; Latrice Royale; Manila Luzon; Miz Cracker; Monét X Change; Shea Couleé; Thorgy Thor; Trinity the Tuck; Vanessa Vanjie Mateo; Willam
February 19, 2019	Portland	United States	Darienne Lake	Alyssa Edwards; BenDeLaCreme; Darienne Lake; Jinkx Monsoon; Lady Bunny; Latrice Royale; Manila Luzon; Miz Cracker; Monét X Change; Shea Couleé; Thorgy Thor; Trinity the Tuck; Vanessa Vanjie Mateo; Willam
February 21, 2019	San Francisco	United States	Darienne Lake	Alyssa Edwards; BenDeLaCreme; Darienne Lake; Jinkx Monsoon; Lady Bunny; Latrice Royale; Manila Luzon; Miz Cracker; Monét X Change; Shea Couleé; Thorgy Thor; Trinity the Tuck; Vanessa Vanjie Mateo; Willam
February 22, 2019	San Francisco	United States	Darienne Lake	Alyssa Edwards; BenDeLaCreme; Darienne Lake; Jinkx Monsoon; Lady Bunny; Latrice Royale; Manila Luzon; Miz Cracker; Monét X Change; Shea Couleé; Thorgy Thor; Trinity the Tuck; Vanessa Vanjie Mateo; Willam
February 23, 2019	Anaheim	United States	Darienne Lake	Alyssa Edwards; BenDeLaCreme; Darienne Lake; Jinkx Monsoon; Lady Bunny; Latrice Royale; Manila Luzon; Miz Cracker; Monét X Change; Shea Couleé; Thorgy Thor; Trinity the Tuck; Vanessa Vanjie Mateo; Willam
February 24, 2019	Phoenix	United States	Darienne Lake	Alyssa Edwards; BenDeLaCreme; Darienne Lake; Jinkx Monsoon; Lady Bunny; Latrice Royale; Manila Luzon; Miz Cracker; Monét X Change; Shea Couleé; Thorgy Thor; Trinity the Tuck; Vanessa Vanjie Mateo; Willam
February 25, 2019	San Diego	United States	Darienne Lake	Alyssa Edwards; BenDeLaCreme; Darienne Lake; Jinkx Monsoon; Lady Bunny; Latrice Royale; Manila Luzon; Miz Cracker; Monét X Change; Shea Couleé; Thorgy Thor; Trinity the Tuck; Vanessa Vanjie Mateo; Willam
February 27, 2019	Albuquerque	United States	Darienne Lake	Alyssa Edwards; BenDeLaCreme; Darienne Lake; Jinkx Monsoon; Lady Bunny; Latrice Royale; Manila Luzon; Miz Cracker; Monét X Change; Shea Couleé; Thorgy Thor; Trinity the Tuck; Vanessa Vanjie Mateo; Willam
February 28, 2019	Denver	United States	Darienne Lake	Alyssa Edwards; BenDeLaCreme; Darienne Lake; Jinkx Monsoon; Lady Bunny; Latrice Royale; Manila Luzon; Miz Cracker; Monét X Change; Shea Couleé; Thorgy Thor; Trinity the Tuck; Vanessa Vanjie Mateo; Willam
March 1, 2019	Lincoln	United States	Darienne Lake	Alyssa Edwards; BenDeLaCreme; Darienne Lake; Jinkx Monsoon; Lady Bunny; Latrice Royale; Manila Luzon; Miz Cracker; Monét X Change; Shea Couleé; Thorgy Thor; Trinity the Tuck; Vanessa Vanjie Mateo; Willam
March 2, 2019	St. Louis	United States	Darienne Lake	Alyssa Edwards; BenDeLaCreme; Darienne Lake; Jinkx Monsoon; Lady Bunny; Latrice Royale; Manila Luzon; Miz Cracker; Monét X Change; Shea Couleé; Thorgy Thor; Trinity the Tuck; Vanessa Vanjie Mateo; Willam
March 3, 2019	Madison	United States	Darienne Lake	Alyssa Edwards; BenDeLaCreme; Darienne Lake; Jinkx Monsoon; Lady Bunny; Latrice Royale; Manila Luzon; Miz Cracker; Monét X Change; Shea Couleé; Thorgy Thor; Trinity the Tuck; Vanessa Vanjie Mateo; Willam
March 4, 2019	Milwaukee	United States	Darienne Lake	Alyssa Edwards; BenDeLaCreme; Darienne Lake; Jinkx Monsoon; Lady Bunny; Latrice Royale; Manila Luzon; Miz Cracker; Monét X Change; Shea Couleé; Thorgy Thor; Trinity the Tuck; Vanessa Vanjie Mateo; Willam
March 6, 2019	Pittsburgh	United States	Darienne Lake	Alyssa Edwards; BenDeLaCreme; Darienne Lake; Jinkx Monsoon; Lady Bunny; Latrice Royale; Manila Luzon; Miz Cracker; Monét X Change; Shea Couleé; Thorgy Thor; Trinity the Tuck; Vanessa Vanjie Mateo; Willam
March 7, 2019	Providence	United States	Darienne Lake	Alyssa Edwards; BenDeLaCreme; Darienne Lake; Jinkx Monsoon; Lady Bunny; Latrice Royale; Manila Luzon; Miz Cracker; Monét X Change; Shea Couleé; Thorgy Thor; Trinity the Tuck; Vanessa Vanjie Mateo; Willam
March 8, 2019	Washington, D.C.	United States	Darienne Lake	Alyssa Edwards; BenDeLaCreme; Darienne Lake; Jinkx Monsoon; Lady Bunny; Latrice Royale; Manila Luzon; Miz Cracker; Monét X Change; Shea Couleé; Thorgy Thor; Trinity the Tuck; Vanessa Vanjie Mateo; Willam
March 9, 2019	Buffalo	United States	Darienne Lake	Alyssa Edwards; BenDeLaCreme; Darienne Lake; Jinkx Monsoon; Lady Bunny; Latrice Royale; Manila Luzon; Miz Cracker; Monét X Change; Shea Couleé; Thorgy Thor; Trinity the Tuck; Vanessa Vanjie Mateo; Willam
March 11, 2019	Boston	United States	Darienne Lake	Alyssa Edwards; BenDeLaCreme; Darienne Lake; Jinkx Monsoon; Lady Bunny; Latrice Royale; Manila Luzon; Miz Cracker; Monét X Change; Shea Couleé; Thorgy Thor; Trinity the Tuck; Vanessa Vanjie Mateo; Willam
March 12, 2019	New York City	United States	Darienne Lake	Alyssa Edwards; BenDeLaCreme; Darienne Lake; Jinkx Monsoon; Lady Bunny; Latrice Royale; Manila Luzon; Miz Cracker; Monét X Change; Shea Couleé; Thorgy Thor; Trinity the Tuck; Vanessa Vanjie Mateo; Willam
March 13, 2019	New York City	United States	Darienne Lake	Alyssa Edwards; BenDeLaCreme; Darienne Lake; Jinkx Monsoon; Lady Bunny; Latrice Royale; Manila Luzon; Miz Cracker; Monét X Change; Shea Couleé; Thorgy Thor; Trinity the Tuck; Vanessa Vanjie Mateo; Willam
March 14, 2019	Toronto	Canada	Darienne Lake	Alyssa Edwards; BenDeLaCreme; Darienne Lake; Jinkx Monsoon; Lady Bunny; Latrice Royale; Manila Luzon; Miz Cracker; Monét X Change; Shea Couleé; Thorgy Thor; Trinity the Tuck; Vanessa Vanjie Mateo; Willam
March 15, 2019 (Note: two shows took place on this date.)	Toronto	Canada	Darienne Lake	Alyssa Edwards; BenDeLaCreme; Darienne Lake; Jinkx Monsoon; Lady Bunny; Latrice Royale; Manila Luzon; Miz Cracker; Monét X Change; Shea Couleé; Thorgy Thor; Trinity the Tuck; Vanessa Vanjie Mateo; Willam
March 16, 2019	Detroit	United States	Darienne Lake	Alyssa Edwards; BenDeLaCreme; Darienne Lake; Jinkx Monsoon; Lady Bunny; Latrice Royale; Manila Luzon; Miz Cracker; Monét X Change; Shea Couleé; Thorgy Thor; Trinity the Tuck; Vanessa Vanjie Mateo; Willam
March 18, 2019	Charlotte	United States	Darienne Lake	Alyssa Edwards; BenDeLaCreme; Darienne Lake; Jinkx Monsoon; Lady Bunny; Latrice Royale; Manila Luzon; Miz Cracker; Monét X Change; Shea Couleé; Thorgy Thor; Trinity the Tuck; Vanessa Vanjie Mateo; Willam
March 20, 2019	Ft. Lauderdale	United States	Darienne Lake	Alyssa Edwards; BenDeLaCreme; Darienne Lake; Jinkx Monsoon; Lady Bunny; Latrice Royale; Manila Luzon; Miz Cracker; Monét X Change; Shea Couleé; Thorgy Thor; Trinity the Tuck; Vanessa Vanjie Mateo; Willam
March 21, 2019	Orlando	United States	Darienne Lake	Alyssa Edwards; BenDeLaCreme; Darienne Lake; Jinkx Monsoon; Lady Bunny; Latrice Royale; Manila Luzon; Miz Cracker; Monét X Change; Shea Couleé; Thorgy Thor; Trinity the Tuck; Vanessa Vanjie Mateo; Willam
March 22, 2019	Birmingham	United States	Darienne Lake	Alyssa Edwards; BenDeLaCreme; Darienne Lake; Jinkx Monsoon; Lady Bunny; Latrice Royale; Manila Luzon; Miz Cracker; Monét X Change; Shea Couleé; Thorgy Thor; Trinity the Tuck; Vanessa Vanjie Mateo; Willam
March 23, 2019	New Orleans	United States	Darienne Lake	Alyssa Edwards; BenDeLaCreme; Darienne Lake; Jinkx Monsoon; Lady Bunny; Latrice Royale; Manila Luzon; Miz Cracker; Monét X Change; Shea Couleé; Thorgy Thor; Trinity the Tuck; Vanessa Vanjie Mateo; Willam
March 24, 2019	Dallas	United States	Darienne Lake	Alyssa Edwards; BenDeLaCreme; Darienne Lake; Jinkx Monsoon; Lady Bunny; Latrice Royale; Manila Luzon; Miz Cracker; Monét X Change; Shea Couleé; Thorgy Thor; Trinity the Tuck; Vanessa Vanjie Mateo; Willam
March 25, 2019	San Antonio	United States	Darienne Lake	Alyssa Edwards; BenDeLaCreme; Darienne Lake; Jinkx Monsoon; Lady Bunny; Latrice Royale; Manila Luzon; Miz Cracker; Monét X Change; Shea Couleé; Thorgy Thor; Trinity the Tuck; Vanessa Vanjie Mateo; Willam
March 26, 2019	Austin	United States	Darienne Lake	Alyssa Edwards; BenDeLaCreme; Darienne Lake; Jinkx Monsoon; Lady Bunny; Latrice Royale; Manila Luzon; Miz Cracker; Monét X Change; Shea Couleé; Thorgy Thor; Trinity the Tuck; Vanessa Vanjie Mateo; Willam
March 27, 2019	Houston	United States	Darienne Lake	Alyssa Edwards; BenDeLaCreme; Darienne Lake; Jinkx Monsoon; Lady Bunny; Latrice Royale; Manila Luzon; Miz Cracker; Monét X Change; Shea Couleé; Thorgy Thor; Trinity the Tuck; Vanessa Vanjie Mateo; Willam
2023 leg
March 28, 2023	Newcastle	United Kingdom	The Vivienne	Baga Chipz; Heidi N Closet; Jimbo; Kandy Muse; Lawrence Chaney; Miz Cracker; The Vivienne; Trinity the Tuck; Willam
March 29, 2023	Glasgow	United Kingdom	The Vivienne	Baga Chipz; Heidi N Closet; Jimbo; Kandy Muse; Lawrence Chaney; Miz Cracker; The Vivienne; Trinity the Tuck; Willam
March 30, 2023	Manchester	United Kingdom	The Vivienne	Baga Chipz; Heidi N Closet; Jimbo; Kandy Muse; Lawrence Chaney; Miz Cracker; The Vivienne; Trinity the Tuck; Willam
March 31, 2023	Sheffield	United Kingdom	The Vivienne	Baga Chipz; Heidi N Closet; Jimbo; Kandy Muse; Lawrence Chaney; Miz Cracker; The Vivienne; Trinity the Tuck; Willam
April 1, 2023	Edinburgh	United Kingdom	The Vivienne	Baga Chipz; Heidi N Closet; Jimbo; Kandy Muse; Lawrence Chaney; Miz Cracker; The Vivienne; Trinity the Tuck; Willam
April 2, 2023	Liverpool	United Kingdom	The Vivienne	Baga Chipz; Heidi N Closet; Jimbo; Kandy Muse; Lawrence Chaney; Miz Cracker; The Vivienne; Trinity the Tuck; Willam
April 4, 2023	Brighton	United Kingdom	The Vivienne	Baga Chipz; Heidi N Closet; Jimbo; Kandy Muse; Lawrence Chaney; Miz Cracker; The Vivienne; Trinity the Tuck; Willam
April 5, 2023	Oxford	United Kingdom	The Vivienne	Baga Chipz; Heidi N Closet; Jimbo; Kandy Muse; Lawrence Chaney; Miz Cracker; The Vivienne; Trinity the Tuck; Willam
April 6, 2023	Nottingham	United Kingdom	The Vivienne	Baga Chipz; Heidi N Closet; Jimbo; Kandy Muse; Lawrence Chaney; Miz Cracker; The Vivienne; Trinity the Tuck; Willam
April 7, 2023	London	United Kingdom	The Vivienne	Baga Chipz; Heidi N Closet; Jimbo; Kandy Muse; Lawrence Chaney; Miz Cracker; The Vivienne; Trinity the Tuck; Willam
April 8, 2023	Cardiff	United Kingdom	The Vivienne	Baga Chipz; Heidi N Closet; Jimbo; Kandy Muse; Lawrence Chaney; Miz Cracker; The Vivienne; Trinity the Tuck; Willam
April 9, 2023	Birmingham	United Kingdom	The Vivienne	Baga Chipz; Heidi N Closet; Jimbo; Kandy Muse; Lawrence Chaney; Miz Cracker; The Vivienne; Trinity the Tuck; Willam
