= Magora Kennedy =

American minister and LGBT civil rights activist

Reverend Goddess Magora Elmira Kennedy
- Born: Magora Ernestine Molineaux; September 22, 1938; Albany, New York, U.S.
- Died: November 6, 2023 (aged 85); New York, New York, U.S.
- Education: Boston University; Yale Divinity School
- Occupations: Minister; Activist; Entertainer
- Known for: Gay liberation

Magora Ernestine Molineaux (September 22, 1938 – November 6, 2023) was an American Baptist minister and LGBT civil rights activist who participated in the Stonewall uprising. She was a former Black Panther and was involved in the civil rights and women’s rights movements. She was a self-proclaimed Black lesbian, crone goddess, and woman of God.

== Early life ==
Kennedy was born on September 22, 1938, in Albany, New York, and raised in Saratoga Springs, New York. Her father was White and Caribbean and her mother was Native American and Black. Her parents raised her with both Baptist and Methodist traditions. Kennedy knew that she was a lesbian from a young age. At age 14, word had spread around Saratoga Springs about Kennedy's crushes on girls. She was outed and, in an attempt to “cure” her homosexuality, her mother offered her the choice of marrying a man, or being institutionalized at the Utica State Hospital, which is where many young LGBTQ+ people were sent to undergo conversion therapy. Instead of complying with her mother's wishes, Kennedy used a forged baptismal certificate stating that her age was 18, and took the entrance exam for the U.S. Air Force, which she passed. She traveled to Waco, Texas to begin her training, which only lasted a few weeks because her mother hired a private detectives to discover her location and bring her back home to New York.

After being brought back home she ended up marrying a man 21 years her senior. The marriage was consummated, but later annulled because of her age. She later married another man, before divorcing him and publicly coming out as a lesbian. Kennedy's second husband was bisexual, with whom she had five children. On the LGBTQ&A podcast, she said, "He was in the army and he was a paratrooper. He was bisexual, so if he got discovered he was going to get kicked out of the army. I said, 'Not a problem. We can just get married.' They used to have the saying 'cover girl', 'cover boy'. And that was the way people that were gay...that's what they did."

== Career ==
Kennedy attended Boston University and worked in live entertainment throughout the 1950's and 1960's as a comedian and singer (known for her platinum wig) before moving to New York to attend seminary at the New York Theological Seminary. Her final performance occurred during a city-wide blackout in New York. Audience members say that in her last performance she seemed to "glow on stage". It was in the midst of this performance that Kennedy had felt that she must follow her spiritual calling and was then drawn to serve the church where she would preach love and acceptance.

After a giving an impressive trial sermon, the Baptist Association Board ordained Kennedy. She then returned to Boston and served as minister of the Universal Life Church and secretary of the Boston Black Action Committee in 1970. She organized a children’s church choir called the “Little Wonders” at Way of the Cross Holy Church of God in Roxbury, but was asked to leave when her lesbianism was discovered.

Kennedy joined the Boston chapter of the Black Panther Party in 1968, spurred by the assassination of Martin Luther King Jr. On the LGBTQ&A podcast, she said, "They started throwing Black Panthers out, those that were gay...I told my commander, 'I'm leaving. I'm taking my sons and I'm going because I worked too hard and ain't nobody throwing me out of nothing.' So, we left. And they said, 'Well, we'll protect you.' I said, 'I don't need protection. I need to be open. And I am not going to subject myself to this.'"

Kennedy took part in the Stonewall uprising in New York in 1969. She was driving to Provincetown when she heard that LGBT people were fighting against a police raid at the Stonewall Inn, so she turned her car around and joined the uprising. She was also a member of Boston’s pride committee during its first pride march of June 1971. At the first stop of the march at drag bar Jacques Cabaret, Kennedy stated a list of demands:

Because we can’t go anywhere else, because as gay women we have been especially ghettoized here in Boston, and because the conditions at gay bars are by and large determined by the straight world, those in control know they can be as oppressive as they want. Jacques is terribly crowded and a fire hazard on weekends. Women entering the bar were subject to taunts by [straight] men, who not only [took] up badly needed room but also got their kicks leering and propositioning the women here. Sanitary conditions hardly exist at all. We are effectively ghettoized, since dancing between members of the same sex and other behavior, which the law deems to call lewd and lascivious, are illegal.

In 1971, she appeared on The David Susskind Show along with other LGBT activists, arguing against the American Psychiatric Association's designation of homosexuality as a mental disorder.

In 1975, she served on the Task Force on Racism of the Christian Social Action Commission of the Metropolitan Community Church.

Kennedy's activism continued throughout her career, and in 2011 she attended Occupy Wall Street protests. In an interview at an Occupy Wall Street protest, Kennedy connected the LGBT rights movement and Occupy Wall Street to the civil rights movement.

In 2021, Kennedy was a guest on a podcast called LGBTQ&A, where she was interview in an episode dedicated to her life and experience as queer person. She also emphasized her concern for the growing suicide rates among LGBTQ youth. "Things are better than they were, but we still have a long way to go. What I’m concerned about now is that young gay people are being thrown out of their homes, committing suicide…these little young people who feel like they have nothing to live for".

== Legacy ==
Interest in Kennedy’s life has increased due to her participation in interviews and exhibits about the 50th anniversary of the Stonewall uprising and her participation in the documentary Cured, an Independent Lens film that appeared on PBS. She is the former Chaplain of the Stonewall Veterans Association and was involved with the National Action Network. Kennedy participated in an oral history interview with the LGBTQ Religious Archives Network in March 2023.

Magora Kennedy describes her philosophy on life in her book This Goddess Has Landed: Does She Have a Message For YOU!:

1. Mother Goddess/Father God loves you just the way you are.
2. So learn to Love Yourself for real, as the star that you are.
3. Love is the most powerful Force in the Universe.
4. Sisterhood is Powerful!

Prior to her death, Kennedy announced that she was working on a book project titled Shades of Stonewall.

Magora Kennedy died on November 7, 2023, at the age of 85.

== See also ==
- Women in the Black Panthers
- Stonewall Riots
- Services & Advocacy for GLBT Elders
