= LGBTQ&A =

Interview podcast

- Genre: LGBTQ interviews
- Language: English

Cast and voices
- Hosted by: Jeffrey Masters

Technical specifications
- Audio format: Podcast (via streaming or downloadable MP3)

Publication
- Original release: August 1, 2016
- Provider: The Advocate
- Updates: Weekly

Related
- Website: lgbtqpodcast.com

LGBTQ&A is a podcast hosted by Jeffrey Masters and produced by The Advocate magazine in partnership with GLAAD. It features interviews with notable LGBTQ figures such as Pete Buttigieg, Laverne Cox, Janelle Monáe, Brandi Carlile, and Roxane Gay. It was launched in 2016 and as of July 2022 has conducted over 250 interviews. The series features a range of LGBTQ guests including activists, politicians, and members of the entertainment industry.

== Background ==
The interview podcast was created by Jeffrey Masters to document modern LGBTQ history, aiming to "go beyond coming out and transition stories". The podcast partnered with The Advocate magazine in 2018. In 2020, it was announced that the podcast would be produced in partnership with GLAAD. "Over the past four years, LGBTQ&A has quickly become a mainstay in queer media," said Rich Ferraro, GLAAD's Chief Communications Officer. "We're excited to come on board this season to help expand the podcast's reach so that more and more LGBTQ people and allies can hear the important stories that Jeffrey so eloquently encourages from his guests."

The first live recording of the show took place at the Big Queer Pod Fest on June 16, 2018, at The Bell House in Brooklyn, New York. The Big Queer Pod Fest was an "all-star alliance" of LGBTQ podcasts that featured LGBTQ&A, Making Gay History, Nancy, and Food 4 Thot.

== Guests ==
In 2022, LGBTQ&A debuted a special series called the LGBTQ+ Elders Project. It's featured interviews with notable LGBTQ elders such as Tracey 'Africa' Norman, André De Shields, Magora Kennedy, Miss Major Griffin-Gracy, Peter Staley, Billie Jean King, Ruthie Berman, Harvey Fierstein, Jamison Green, Mark Segal, Charles Silverstein, Kate Bornstein, François Clemmons, Cleve Jones, Edmund White, and Angela Davis.

Other notable guests have included Laverne Cox, Janelle Monáe, Alok Vaid-Menon, Margaret Cho, Melissa Etheridge, LZ Granderson, Niecy Nash, Charles M. Blow, Jim Obergefell, Tammy Baldwin, Ts Madison, and Karine Jean-Pierre.

The podcast features the last recorded interviews with Gloria Allen, activist Ivy Bottini, activist Shatzi Weisberger, author Charles Silverstein, and drag queen Darcelle XV.

== Host ==
Jeffrey Masters is a GLAAD Media Award-winning journalist who has made multiple appearances on NPR's Pop Culture Happy Hour and MSNBC. In 2018, Masters was recognized on Logo TV's "Logo30" list of 30 influential LGBTQ people for his work on the podcast. They wrote, "Whether he's chatting with seminal AIDS advocate Cleve Jones or rising powerhouses like Our Lady J and Keiynan Lonsdale, Masters digs deep, surpassing expected coming out stories in favor of examining specific life moments that have defined the queer luminaries we love."

Oprah Magazine wrote, "Masters welcomes high-profile people...with his unique brand of probing curiosity," and Women's Health magazine described him as a "thoughtful, humble, and inquisitive journalist."

== Awards and honors ==
- In February 2017, LGBTQ&A was ranked #2 on a list of the top podcasts to listen to by BuzzFeed.
- In May 2017, LGBTQ&A was recommended by The New York Times. They wrote, "If you want to understand what it sounds like when a host is prepared, look no further than Jeffrey Masters. His interest in his guests' stories, as well as his encouraging manner, allows him to get beyond the surface whether he's interviewing activists or members of the entertainment industry."
- In September 2017, NBC Out polled its constituents about their "favorite LGBTQ-inclusive podcasts," and LGBTQ&A was selected as one of the 11.
- In June 2021, Masters was interviewed on MSNBC about his work on LGBTQ&A. He has since appeared multiple times on the network as a contributor.
- LGBTQ&A was nominated for Outstanding Podcast at the GLAAD Media Awards in 2023.
