= Gummy Bear (album) =

Studio album by Ginger Minj
- Released: June 25, 2021
- Length: 24:34
- Label: Producer Entertainment Group

Ginger Minj chronology
Sweet T (2016)	Gummy Bear (2021)	Double Wide Diva (2021)

Singles from Gummy Bear
- 1. "Gummy Bear" Released: June 25, 2021

Gummy Bear is the second studio album by Ginger Minj, released by Producer Entertainment Group on June 25, 2021. Fellow RuPaul's Drag Race contestants Eureka O'Hara, Jiggly Caliente, and Katya Zamolodchikova, as well as drag performer Lady Bunny, collaborated on the album.

== Composition ==
"Gummy Bear" is a pop song.

== Promotion ==
Ginger Minj performed "Gummy Bear" on the premiere of the sixth season of RuPaul's Drag Race All Stars. The song's music video has cameo appearances by fellow Drag Race contestants Eureka O'Hara and Jiggly Caliente, as well as shots of Kathy Najimy, Dustin Milligan, and Chi Chi DeVayne.

== Track listing ==
Gummy Bear track listing
No.	Title	Length
1.	"Random Ru Girl" (featuring Stacy Layne Matthews, Katya, and Eureka O'Hara)	2:47
2.	"Bingo Queen" (featuring Gidget Galore)	3:08
3.	"Top 2 Bottom" (featuring Meatball and Jonny McGovern)	3:11
4.	"Gummy Bear"	2:49
5.	"Do It Like Dolly"	3:10
6.	"Chub Love" (featuring Jiggly Caliente and CeeJay)	3:15
7.	"Dad Jokes"	2:43
8.	"Clown F@#%er" (featuring Lady Bunny)	3:31
Total length:		24:34
