= Hello, Kitty Girls! =

- RuPaul's Drag Race episode
- Episode no.: Season 7 Episode 11

Guest appearances
- Santino Rice; Rebecca Romijn

Episode chronology
← Previous "Prancing Queens"	Next → "And the Rest Is Drag"

"Hello, Kitty Girls!" is the eleventh episode of the seventh season of the American television series RuPaul's Drag Race. It originally aired on May 11, 2015. The episode's main challenge tasks contestants with creating and presenting looks inspired by the fictional character Hello Kitty. Santino Rice and Rebecca Romijn are guest judges. Violet Chachki wins the main challenge. Katya is eliminated from the competition after placing in the bottom two and losing a lip-sync contest against Kennedy Davenport to "Roar" by Katy Perry.

== Episode ==
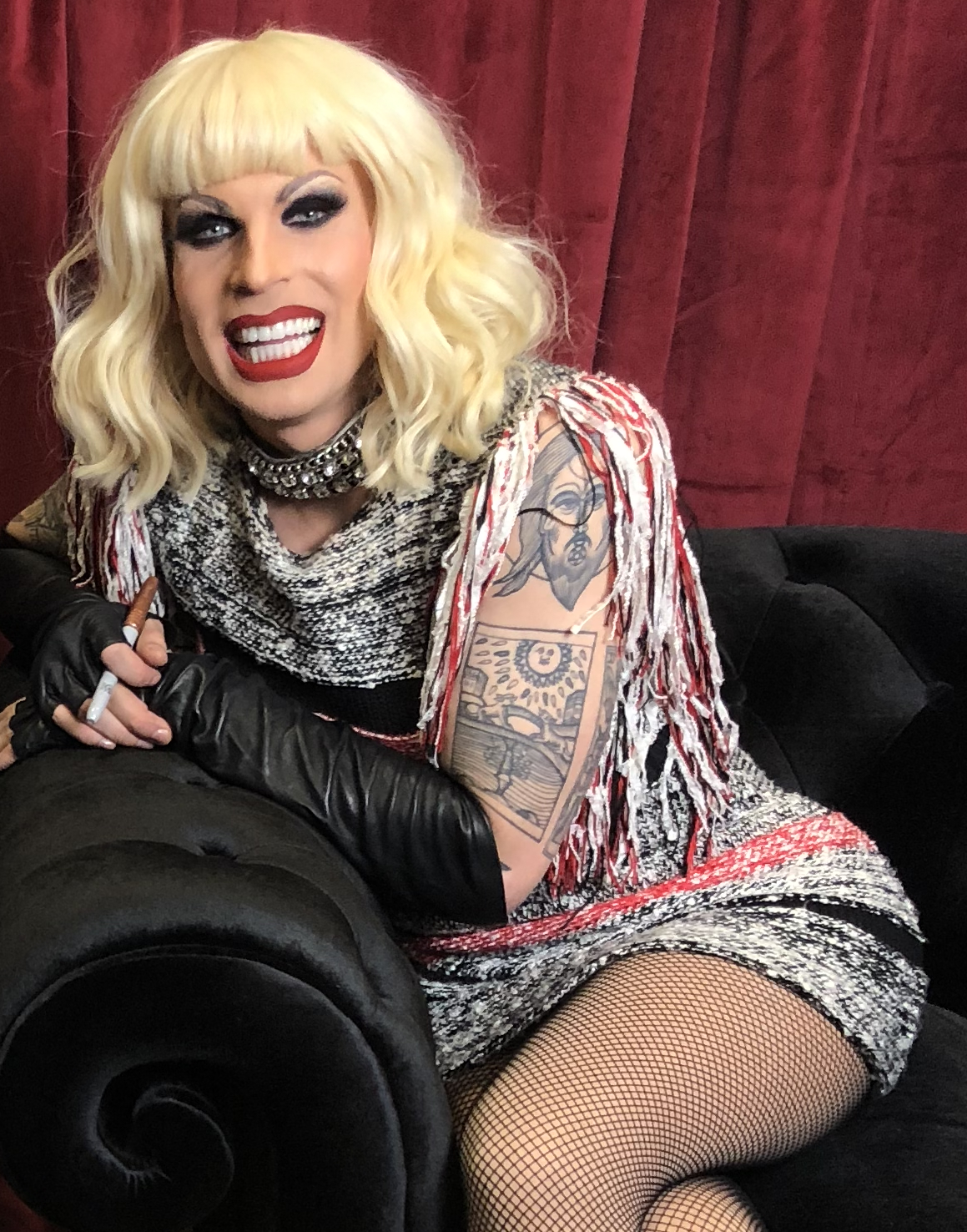
Katya (pictured at RuPaul's DragCon NYC in 2018) is eliminated from the competition.

The remaining five contestants return to the Werk Room after Trixie Mattel's elimination on the previous episode. The contestants discuss the state of the competition and get out of drag. On a new day, RuPaul greets the group and reveals and mini challenge, which tasks contestants with putting on a puppet show in which they decorate stuffed dolls and impersonate each other. Pearl impersonates Kennedy Davenport, who then impersonates Pearl. Violet Chachki impersonates Katya, who then impersonates Ginger Minj. Ginger Minj impersonates Violet Chachki, then is declared the winner. RuPaul reveals the main challenge, which tasks contestants with creating looks inspired by Hello Kitty. For winning the mini challenge, Ginger Minj earns a time advantage to collect materials for the main challenge. The contestants gather materials and begin to create.

While designing their looks, RuPaul and Santino Rice visit the Werk Room to ask questions and offer advice to the contestants. RuPaul shares that Rice will be a guest judge, then asks members of the Pit Crew to bring in materials for the contestants to create second "character" looks for themselves. The contestants prepare for the fashion show. Pearl describes the origins of her drag persona.

On the main stage, RuPaul welcomes fellow judges Michelle Visage and Carson Kressley as well as guest judges Rice and Rebecca Romijn. Hello Kitty walks the runway, then the contestants present their looks. The judges deliver their critiques, then deliberate with help from Hello Kitty while the contestants wait backstage. RuPaul brings back the contestants and reveals the results. Violet Chachki is declared the winner of the main challenge for her mod-inspired look. Katya and Kennedy Davenport place in the bottom two and face off in a lip-sync contest to "Roar" (2013) by Katy Perry. Kennedy Davenport wins the lip-sync and Katya is eliminated from the competition.

== Production and broadcast ==
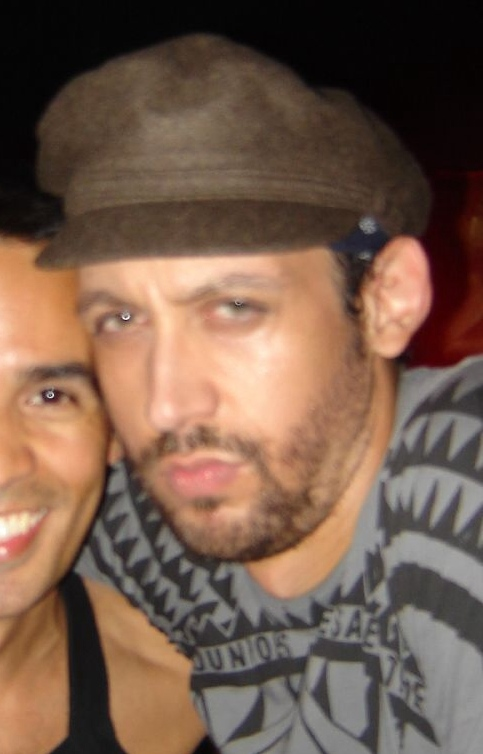
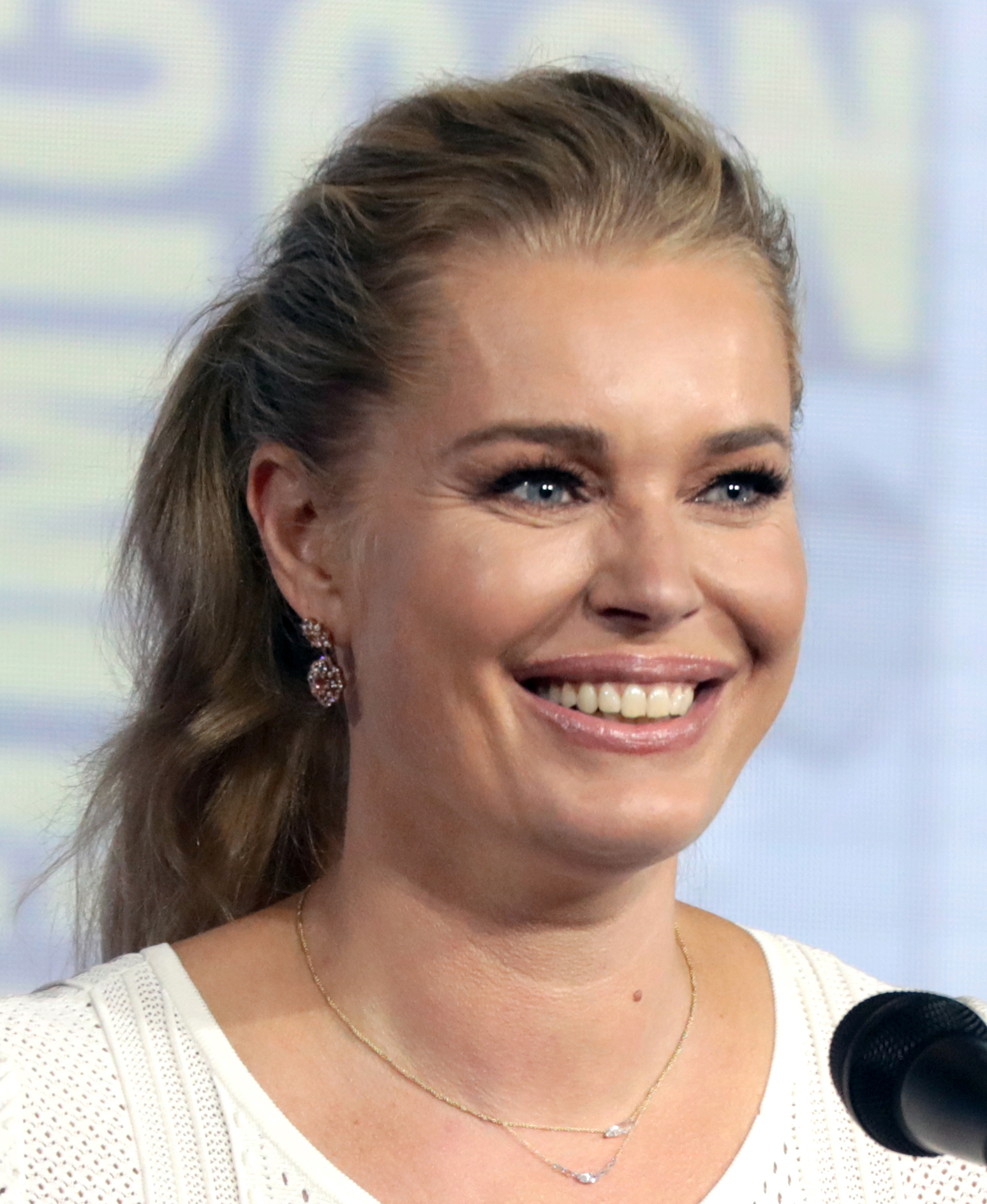
Santino Rice (left) and Rebecca Romijn (right) are guest judges on the episode.

The episode originally aired on May 11, 2015. A Hello Kitty mascot helps RuPaul introduce the main challenge. Rice was previously a regular judge on Drag Race.

Both contestants performed a split during the lip-sync contest.

=== Fashion ===
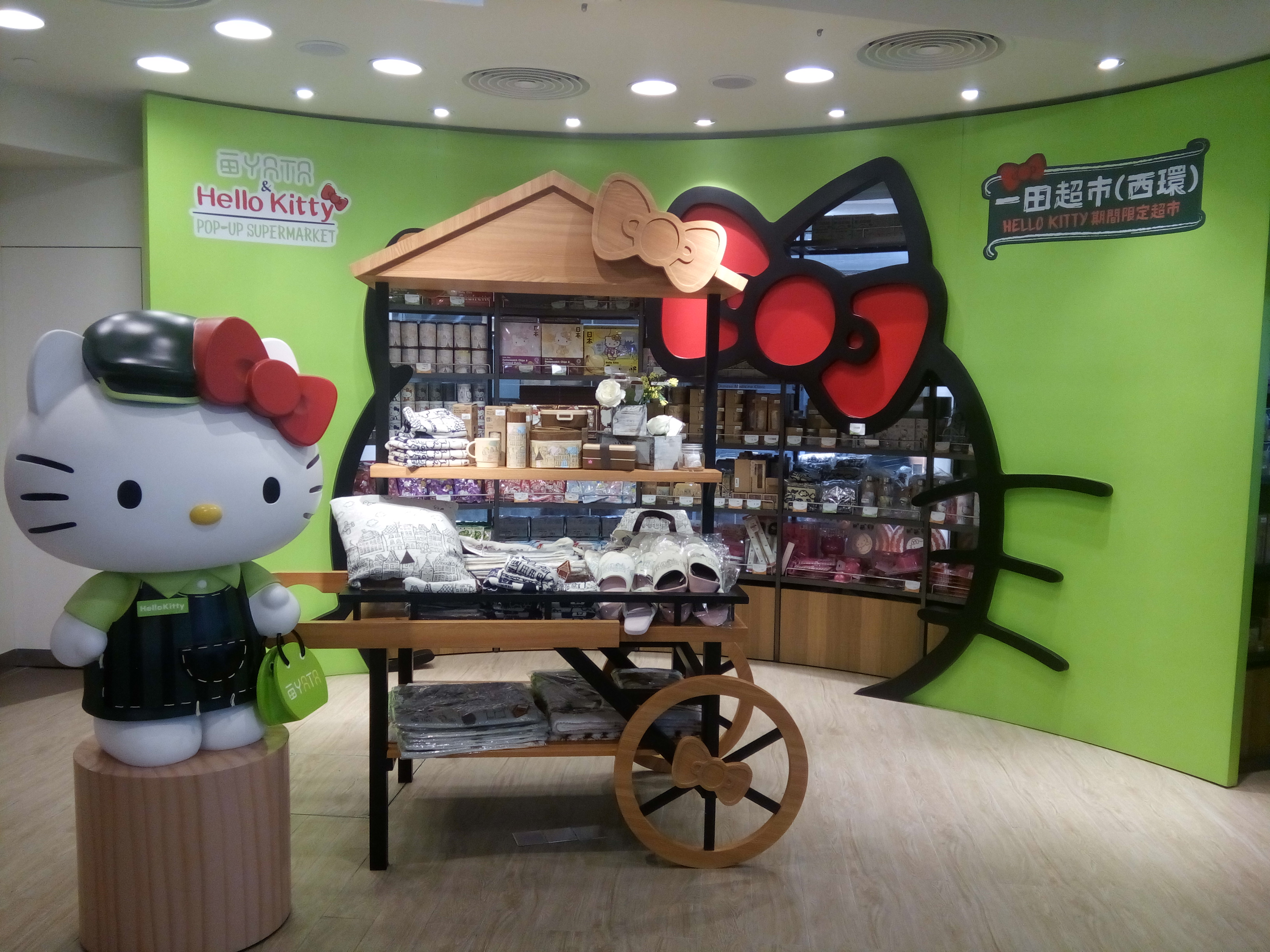
The episode's main challenge has contestants create looks inspired by the fictional character Hello Kitty (pictured is a Hello Kitty shop in Hong Kong in 2017).

For the main stage, RuPaul wears an asymmetrical blonde wig.

For the "character" part of the fashion show (category "Hello Kitty BFF Realness"), Violate Chachki wears a pink dress with matching hat and shoes. Ginger Minj's cow-inspired look features a pink dress with white polka dots. Pearl has a white fur coat, gold jewelry, and a blonde wig. Katya wears a Russia-inspired outfit. She wears a red scarf and has a cigarette in her mouth. She also carries a small red flag with a hammer and sickle. Kennedy Davenport wears a short blue dress with a white print. She has blue shoes and a matching bow in her hair.

For the category "Hello Kitty Eleganza", Violate Chacki wears a 1960s-inspired pink dress and a pink headpiece. Ginger Minj has a pink dress with a matching bow in her hair. She has an accessory made from stuffed toys. Pearl wears a stuffed Hello Kitty head as an accessory. Katya's 1960s-inspired outfit is black and pink. Kennedy Davenport also has a black-and-pink outfit, with black boots and a handbag.

== Reception ==
Oliver Sava of The A.V. Club gave the episode a rating of 'A'. In Screen Rant's 2020 overview of the show's ball challenges, Anja Grčar opined: "Season 7's Ball Challenge is not a fan-favorite for several reasons. Firstly, the queens only had to make two outfits rather than the usual three... Additionally, the girls didn't seem to produce any outfits that would make it to the best in the history of the show. Many fans thought that the first look was just a joke rather than an actual look. Since season 7 was hyped as one of the most fashionable so far, 'Hello, Kitty Girls!' was a huge let down." In the website's 2021 list of ten Drag Race contestants "who could win" the television series Project Runway, Amii Johnson said Violet Chachki delivered "one of the best ball challenge outfits" on Drag Race. In 2023, Bernardo Sim of Pride.com selected the performance of "Roar" to represent season 7 in an overview of the show's best lip-syncs from each season. Similarly, Stephen Daw selected "Roar" for Billboard's 2024 list of the best lip-syncs from each the show's seasons. Daw wrote, "Talk about a photo finish. From the start of this high-octane number, both queens fought tooth and nail to gain their spot in the top four of the season. Every word, every beat, every emotion was accounted for. But when it came time for the grand finale, Kennedy pushed herself over the edge … literally, by jumping off of the stage into a split. Katya’s cartwheel into a split certainly landed with the judges, but Kennedy’s powerful performance just could not be denied in this bombastic lip sync." Visage has said the "Roar" performance is among her favorite of all time.
