= Ginger Minj =

American drag performer (born 1984)

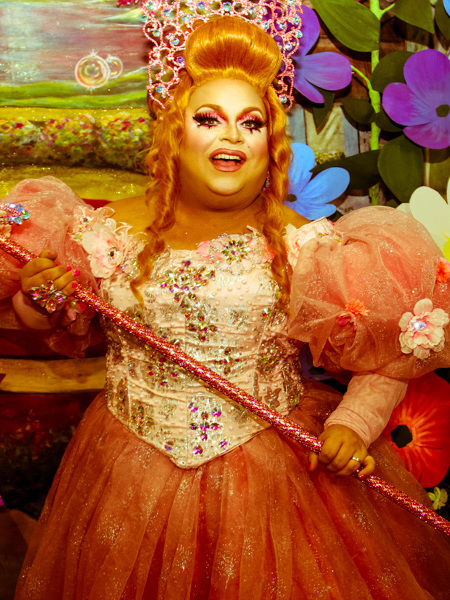
- Ginger Minj at RuPaul's DragCon LA 2018
- Born: Joshua Allen Eads; September 11, 1984 (age 42); Leesburg, Florida, U.S.
- Other name: Ginger
- Occupations: Drag queen, actor, singer-songwriter, reality television personality
- Years active: 2009-present
- Known for: RuPaul's Drag Race (season 7) and RuPaul's Drag Race All Stars (season 2, season 6 and season 10)
- Notable work: Stop! That! Train!; Dumplin'; Hocus Pocus 2
- Website: https://gingerminj.com/

Joshua Allen Eads, better known by the stage name Ginger Minj (born September 11, 1984), is an American drag queen, actor, singer-songwriter, and reality television personality. After achieving recognition for placing as the runner-up on the seventh season of the reality television competition series RuPaul's Drag Race, Minj returned to compete on the second, sixth, and tenth seasons of RuPaul's Drag Race All Stars, winning the latter on July 18, 2025. Minj has acted in three Netflix productions (the comedy feature film Dumplin' (2018), the animated series Super Drags, and RuPaul's fictional series AJ and the Queen), and has acted in numerous theatrical productions. Minj appeared in the 2022 film Hocus Pocus 2, the sequel to Hocus Pocus. She played Tess in the 2026 film Stop! That! Train! Minj has released three studio albums—Sweet T (2016), Gummy Bear (2021), and Double Wide Diva (2021).

== Early life ==
Eads was born in Lake County, Florida. Eads is of Puerto Rican and Irish descent. Her father abandoned the household when she was a child. She described herself as a "short fat kid with a real limp wrist" who had been bullied. She wore dresses and her mother's and sister's clothing at age 9. Eads studied theater at school. Her first time in drag was with “BOYS BOYS BOYS” at the Orlando Fringe Festival in 2005. Her drag mother is retired Orlando performer Rusty Fawcett and her drag father is legendary male entertainer and pageant promoter, Bob Taylor.

== Career ==
=== Drag Race ===
Ginger Minj competed on the seventh season of the reality television competition RuPaul's Drag Race, which was announced on March 2, 2015. Throughout the competition, Minj won three challenges, most notably the Snatch Game, portraying Adele (tying with Kennedy Davenport's portrayal of Little Richard). Minj's performance of Adele was later ranked as the sixth best Snatch Game performance in Drag Race "herstory" by Sam Damshenas of Gay Times. Minj ultimately lost to Violet Chachki in the final episode, placing as a runner-up alongside Pearl.

Minj was subsequently announced as one of ten contestants for the second season of RuPaul's Drag Race All Stars on June 17, 2016. Minj was eliminated in the third episode, placing eighth overall. Minj then appeared as a guest for the first challenge in the premiere episode of season eleven.

Following Drag Race, Minj embarked on several international drag tours. In 2016, Minj was a part of Battle of the Seasons rotating roster of queens. Minj hosted the Haters Roast tour, though controversially was later fired from the event. Minj later hosted Queens United in November 2017, a benefit put together by Phi Phi O'Hara in an effort to raise money for people affected by Hurricane Maria.

In April 2020, amid the coronavirus pandemic, Minj was announced as a featured cast member for the very first Digital Drag Fest, an online drag festival. Minj returned the following year for the second annual Digital Drag Fest, in May 2021.

On May 26, 2021, Minj was announced as a contestant for the sixth season of RuPaul's Drag Race All Stars. After winning a lip sync against Mayhem Miller in the fifth episode of the season, Minj won $30,000. Minj won another $20,000 in the eighth episode of the season, Snatch Game of Love, after winning a lip sync against Heidi N Closet and making her the second queen to win the Snatch Game twice, after BenDeLaCreme. Ginger Minj finished the season as a runner-up alongside Eureka! and Ra'Jah O'Hara, ultimately losing to Kylie Sonique Love.

On April 23, 2025, Ginger Minj was announced as one of eighteen former Drag Race contestants participating in the tenth season of RuPaul's Drag Race All Stars. On July 18, 2025, Ginger Minj won in the final round of the Lip Sync Smackdown for the Crown and was crowned the winner of Season 10.

=== Pageants ===
Minj has competed in many pageants throughout her career, holding several titles including "Miss National Comedy Queen 2012" and "Miss Gay United States 2013".

=== Music ===
Minj released her first single, "Ooh Lala Lala", on June 1, 2015. A second single, "Bad, Bad Boy", was released on October 21, 2016. Minj's debut album, Sweet T, was released in October 2016. The album consists of a mix of original songs and covers and features of variety of styles including pop, rock, dance, jazz, and soul. Minj also contributed to the compilation album Christmas Queens 3 in 2017.

Another album, Clown Fucker, was set to be released in December 2018, but was pushed back to early 2019, and, as of 2021, remains unreleased. On June 11, 2021, Ginger Minj announced her second studio album, Gummy Bear, would be released on June 25, 2021, with "Clown Fucker" as one its tracks. She performed the title track "Gummy Bear" on the first episode of All Stars 6. The album peaked at #2 on the iTunes Comedy Album Charts.

In September 2021, Minj released her third album, Double Wide Diva. The country album featured seven original songs and a cover of Garth Brooks' "Friends in Low Places". Minj co-wrote each original song on the album, six of which alongside Brandon Stansell and Jeffrey James with producer Aaron Aiken.

In May 2022, Ginger Minj portrayed the voice of Puss Puss Dubois in Alaska's Drag: The Musical (Studio Cast Recording), a studio recording of a planned stage production about two rival drag bars that go head-to-head while struggling through financial troubles.

=== Acting ===
Minj began her career as a child actor, acting in Christian films and books on tape. As an adult, Minj continued acting, starring in Clandestine Arts' production of Avenue Q. Minj performed with other All Stars 2 queens at the Trailblazer Honors for Harvey Fierstein as the only singing performer on July 7, 2016. Minj was with Katya and Alyssa Edwards on commercial bumpers for a Mama's Family marathon for the Logo channel.

In 2014, Minj played Mrs. Lovett in Sweeney Todd at Orlando's Clandestine-Arts. The casting initially lead to a cease-and-desist order in response to her casting, but this was resolved when a video of Ginger performing the role was sent to composer/lyricist Stephen Sondheim, who personally signed off on her performance.

Minj voiced the character Lemon Chiffon in the 2018 Netflix original series Super Drags.

In 2018, Minj starred in the Netflix musical comedy feature film Dumplin'. In 2020, Minj portrayed Tommy and drag queen Fanny Pak on the Netflix comedy AJ and the Queen, alongside RuPaul, in the episode "Fort Worth".

In August 2020, Minj starred in Drama at Drag Brunch: The Slaying of the Sequin Sisters, the fifth installment of the virtual interactive Broadway Murder Mystery story, portraying the role of Casey Closed.

In 2022, Minj starred as Albin in La Cage Aux Folles at Music Theater Works in the Chicago Area. The production featured Jason Richards as Georges and was directed by Kyle A.Dougan with costumes by Project Runway’s Justin LeBlanc.

In 2026, Minj starred as train attendent Tess in Stop! That! Train!

=== Other ventures ===
In October 2021, Minj signed a six-figure book deal with Atria Books to publish her first book, "Southern Fried Sass". In August 2022, she headlined the 40th annual Northalsted Market Days, an annual LGBTQ-friendly street festival.

In 2023 Minj released a stand up comedy special, Bless Your Heart.

== Personal life ==
Minj is non-binary and uses she/her pronouns both in and out of drag.

Minj was married to Ceejay Russell by Michelle Visage at a DragCon convention in 2017. She is polyamorous and is in a polyamorous relationship as of 2026 with CeeJay and Michael.

Minj is 5'3 and weighed 310 pounds at her heaviest but has lost 160 pounds. She said that she is still proud to be plus-size.

She has autism and asthma.

== Discography ==
=== Studio albums ===
Title	Details
Sweet T	Released: October 21, 2016; Label: Producer Entertainment Group; Formats: CD, digital download, streaming
Gummy Bear	Released: June 25, 2021; Label: Producer Entertainment Group; Formats: Digital download, streaming
Double Wide Diva	Released: September 17, 2021; Label: Producer Entertainment Group; Formats: Digital download, streaming

=== Singles ===
Title	Year	Album
"Ooh Lala Lala"	2016	Sweet T
"Bad, Bad Boy"	2016	Sweet T
"Winter Wonderland" (featuring Gidget Galore)	2020	Non-album single
"Gummy Bear"	2021	Gummy Bear
"Walk Tall"	2021	Double Wide Diva
"Sisters" (featuring Gidget Galore)	2021	Non-album single
"Sunshine State" (with Brandon Stansell)	2022	Non-album single
"The Big Opening" (with Monét X Change and the cast of Huluween Dragstravaganza)	2022	Non-album single
"I Put a Spell On You"	2022	Non-album single

=== As featured artist ===
Title	Year	Album
"Show Up Queen" (with the Cast of RuPaul's Drag Race All Stars, Season 6)	2021	Non-album single
"This Is Our Country" (RuPaul and Tanya Tucker featuring The Cast of RuPaul's Drag Race All Stars, Season 6)	2021	Non-album single
"Guilt's So Heavy" (Trinity the Tuck featuring Ginger Minj)	2023	Trinity Ruins Christmas: The Musical
"Good Enough" (Trinity the Tuck featuring Ginger Minj)	2023	Trinity Ruins Christmas: The Musical

=== Other appearances ===
Title	Year	Other artist(s)	Album
"Christma-Hannu-Kwanzaa-Ka"	2015	N/A	Christmas Queens
"Let the Music Play"	2015	RuPaul	RuPaul Presents CoverGurlz 2
"Eggs"	2016	Lucian Piane, Trixie Mattel	RuPaul's Drag Race: The Rusical
"Down Home Country Christmas"	2016	Carnie Wilson	Christmas Queens 2
"Xmas Hams"	2016	Jiggly Caliente	Christmas Queens 2
"White Christmas"	2017	N/A	Christmas Queens 3
"All This Body"	2018	Jiggly Caliente, Alaska Thunderfuck	T.H.O.T. Process
"Have Yourself a Merry Little Christmas"	2018	N/A	Christmas Queens 4

== Filmography ==
=== Film credits ===
Year	Title	Role	Notes
2018	Miss Arizona	Ginger	
2018	A Queen for the People	Herself	Documentary film about Bob the Drag Queen
2018	Dumplin'	Candee Disch	
2019	The Queens	Herself	Documentary
2021	The Bitch Who Stole Christmas	Hazel Delashes	
2022	Hocus Pocus 2	Winifred Sanderson impersonator	
2023	Ginger Minj: Bless Your Heart	Herself	Comedy special
2024	Stan Behavior	Goldie Hon	
2024	The Legacy of Cloudy Falls	Loyd	
2026	Stop! That! Train!	Tess	

=== Television credits ===
Year	Title	Role	Notes	Ref
2015	RuPaul's Drag Race (season 7)	Herself (contestant)	Contestant (Runner-up)	
2015	RuPaul's Drag Race: Untucked	Herself (contestant)	Contestant (Runner-up)	
2016	RuPaul's Drag Race All Stars (season 2)	Herself (contestant)	Contestant (8th Place)	
2017	Good Behavior	Ruby Flare	Episode: You Could Discover Me	
2017	House of Mayhem	Herself	Unsold pilot	
2017	@midnight	Herself	Episode 580	
2018	Super Drags	Lemon Chiffon	English dub, Main Cast	
2019	RuPaul's Drag Race (season 11)	Herself (guest)/Donald Trump	2 episodes	
2020	AJ and the Queen	Tommy / Fanny Pak	Guest appearance	
2020	Women Behind Bars	Ada	TV movie	
2021	RuPaul's Drag Race All Stars (season 6)	Herself	Contestant (Runner-up)	
2021	RuPaul's Drag Race All Stars: Untucked	Herself	Contestant (Runner-up)	
2022	Huluween Dragstravaganza	Herself	Hulu original	
2023	Drag Me to Dinner	Herself	Hulu original	
2024	Chopped	Judge / Miss Ginger	"Drag Brunch"	
2025	RuPaul's Drag Race All Stars (season 10)	Herself	Contestant (Winner)	

=== Theatre ===
Year	Title	Role	Theatre	Ref(s)
2009	The Wiz	Lion	Theater Downtown, Orlando	
2010	Torch Song Trilogy	Arnold Beckoff	Breakthrough Theatre	
2011	Evil Dead: The Musical	Jake	Theater Downtown, Orlando	
2011	Chicago	Mary Sunshine	Theater Downtown, Orlando	
2012	Hedwig and the Angry Inch	Hedwig Robinson	The Abbey	
2014	Sweeney Todd	Mrs. Lovett	The Venue	
2015–2017	The Rocky Horror Show	Frank N. Furter	Woodlawn Theatre	
2016	America's Drag Stars	Herself	Borgata Music Box	
2017	Avenue Q	Brian	State Theater	
2019	The Golden Gals	Blanche	Footlight Theater at The Parliament House	
2019	Women Behind Bars	Ada	The Montalban	
2020	Rozeanne	Rozeanne	Footlight Theater at The Parliament House	
2021	Into the Woods	Giant (voice cameo)	Mathis Ellis Performing Arts Center	
2021	Arden	Titania	Silver Venue	
2022	La Cage aux Folles	Albin	Music Theater Works	
2022	Gilliganz's Island	Ginger Grant	Clermont Performing Arts Center	
2023	Golden Gals Live!	Blanche	Various	
2024	The Broad's Way	Mamma Rose	Mercury Theater’s Venus Cabaret	

=== Music videos ===
Year	Title	Artist	Ref.
2015	"Uptown Fish"	Shangela	
2015	"Born Naked" (Stadium Remix)	RuPaul	
2015	"Ooh Lala Lala"	Herself	
2016	"The T"	Alaska Thunderfuck	
2017	"White Christmas"	Herself	
2017	"Let It Snow"	Christmas Queens	
2018	"Where My Man At"	Velo ft Manila Luzon and Eureka O'Hara	
2018	"All This Body"	Jiggly Caliente ft. Alaska Thunderfuck & Ginger Minj	
2018	"Jolene"	Dolly Parton	
2020	"Winter Wonderland"	Herself	
2021	"Gummy Bear"	Herself	
2021	"Friends in Low Places"	Herself	
2022	"I Put A Spell on You"	Herself	

=== Web series ===
Year	Title	Role	Notes	Ref
2015	Drunk Makeover	Herself (guest)	Episode 23	
2016	Transformations	Herself (guest)	Episode: "Ginger Minj"	
2016	Cooking with Drag Queens	Herself (guest)	Episode: "Ginger Pie"	
2016	Couple$ for Ca$h	Herself (guest)	Episode: "Ginger Minj & Chris"	
2016–2018	Southern Fried Sass	Herself (co-host)	WOWPresents Plus Original, 4 episodes	
2016	Drag Queens React	Herself / Donald Trump	World of Wonder original	
2016	The Final Lap	Herself (guest)	Season 2, episode 3	
2016	Queen to Queen	Herself (guest)	With Coco Montrese	
2017	Hey Qween!	Herself (guest)	Episode: "Ginger Minj on Hey Qween!"	
2018	CRAIGSLIST Missed Connections	Herself	Guest	
2018	Spillin' the Tea	Herself (panelist)	Billboard series	
2018	The Pit Stop	Herself (guest)	Episode: "Ginger Minj"	
2019	Wigs in a Blanket	Herself	Co-host with Jiggly Caliente	
2019	The X Change Rate	Herself (guest)	Episode: "Ginger Minj & Jinkx Monsoon"	
2020	The Golden Pandemic	Blanche	Starring role	
2020	Binge	Herself (guest)	Podcast by Entertainment Weekly	
2021	Whatcha Packin'	Herself (guest)	Episode: "Ginger Minj"	
2021	Ruvealing the Look	Herself (guest)	Episode: "Ginger Minj’s Pop Art Look"	
2021	WOW Now	Herself (guest)	Episode: "The Bitch Who Stole Christmas"	
2022	EW News Flash	Herself	Guest with Kornbread Jeté and Kahmora Hall	
2024	Drag Me to The Movies	Various	Produced by World of Wonder	

Preceded by Angeria Paris VanMicheals	Winner of RuPaul's Drag Race All Stars; US All Stars 10	Succeeded by Crystal Methyd
