= Sweet T (album) =

Studio album by Ginger Minj
- Released: October 21, 2016
- Length: 75:37
- Label: PEG

Ginger Minj chronology
Sweet T (2016)	Gummy Bear (2021)

Singles from Sweet T
- 1. "Ooh Lala Lala" Released: June 2, 2015; 2. "Bad, Bad Boy" Released: September 23, 2016

Sweet T is the debut studio album by American drag queen and singer Ginger Minj, released on October 21, 2016. The album features cover versions and original music.

== Promotion ==
The album was preceded by the singles "Ooh Lala Lala" and "Bad, Bad Boy". Ginger Minj performed the song "Dream a Little Dream" on the first episode of RuPaul's Drag Race All Stars season 2.

== Track listing ==
Sweet T track listing
No.	Title	Writer(s)	Length
1.	"You Think You're a Man"	Geoff Deane; William Miller	4:24
2.	"Ride or Die" (featuring Margaret Cho)	Diego Sanchez; Jean Morrison	4:26
3.	"My Man" (featuring Jean Morrison)	Sanchez; Morrison	5:24
4.	"Bad, Bad Boy"	Sanchez; Morrison	3:39
5.	"I've Gotta Be Alone"	Sanchez; Morrison	4:15
6.	"Ooh Lala Lala"	Sanchez; Morrison; Joshua Brown	4:35
7.	"Losing My Religion"	Bill Berry; Brian Wakefield; Michael Stipe; Mike Mills; Peter Buck; Robert Anthony Baskaran	3:45
8.	"Never Shoulda"	Sanchez; Morrison; Joshua Eads	3:56
9.	"Dream a Little Dream"	Sanchez; Morrison	6:52
10.	"God Only Knows" (featuring Carnie Wilson)	Brian Wilson; Tony Asher	3:25
11.	"The Game"	Sanchez; Morrison	5:08
12.	"Father's Songs"	Sanchez; Morrison; Eads	4:15
13.	"Here Comes the Rain Again"	Annie Lennox; David Allen Stewart	6:20
14.	"Leave It All Behind"	Sanchez; Morrison	3:52
15.	"Save Me"	Sanchez; Morrison	5:23
16.	"Dream a Little Dream" (bonus track)	Sanchez; Morrison	6:25
Total length:			75:37
