= Katya Zamolodchikova =

American drag queen (born 1982)

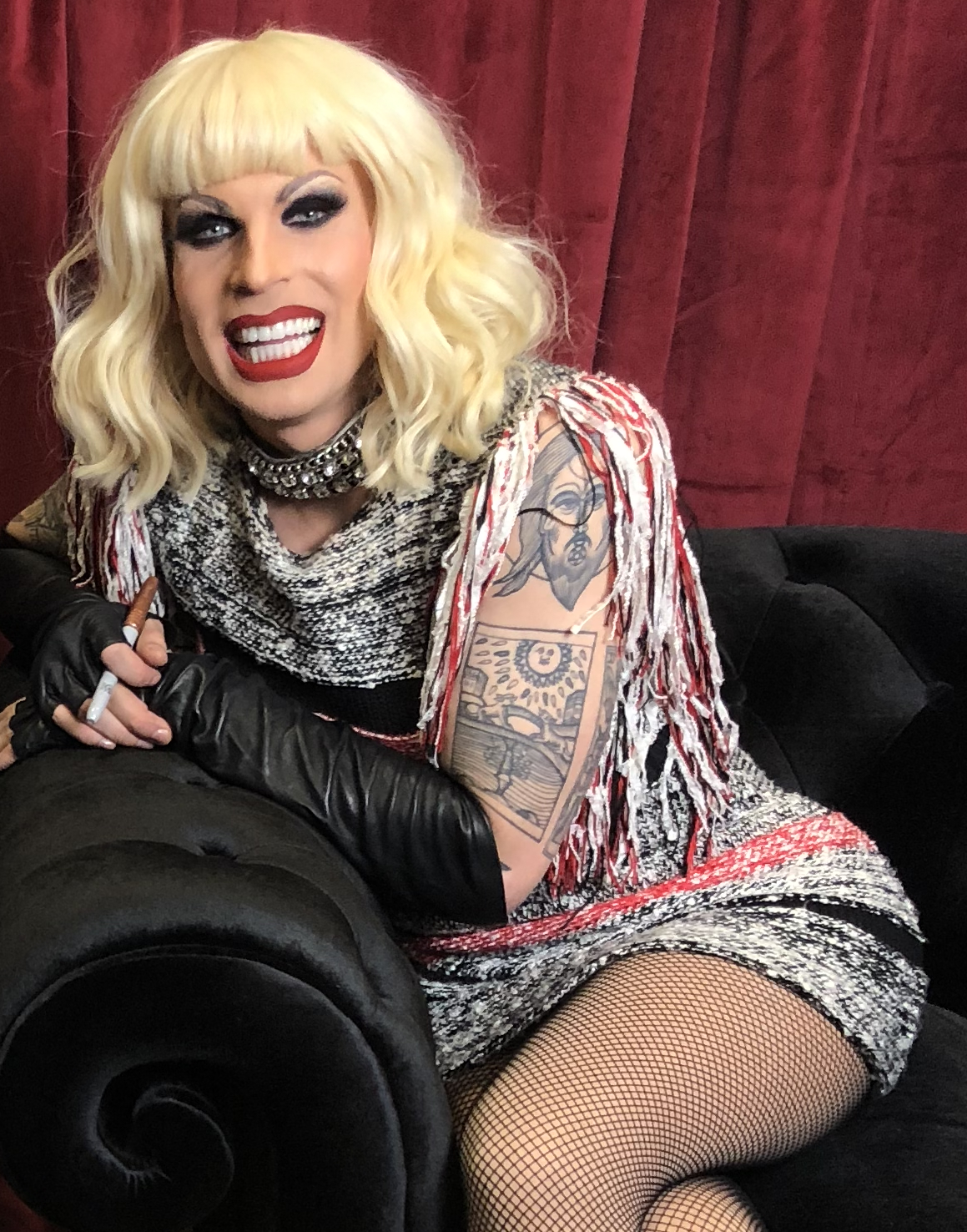
- Katya Zamolodchikova in 2018
- Born: Brian Joseph McCook; May 1, 1982 (age 44); Boston, Massachusetts, U.S.
- Education: MassArt (BFA)
- Occupations: Drag queen; comedian; actor; reality television personality; author; music artist
- Years active: 2006–present
- Known for: RuPaul's Drag Race season 7; RuPaul's Drag Race All Stars season 2; The Trixie & Katya Show; UNHhhh
- Title: Miss Congeniality
- Predecessor: BenDeLaCreme
- Successor: Cynthia Lee Fontaine

YouTube information
- Channel: welovekatya
- Subscribers: 281k
- Views: 20 million
- Last updated: November 21, 2025
- Website: welovekatya.com

Brian Joseph McCook (born May 1, 1982), better known as drag persona Yekaterina Petrovna Zamolodchikova or Katya, is an American drag queen, actor, author, recording artist, podcaster, and comedian. Katya is best known for placing fifth on the seventh season of RuPaul's Drag Race (2015), and she placed as a runner-up on the second season of RuPaul's Drag Race All Stars (2016). She is also known for appearing in the World of Wonder web series UNHhhh (2016–2023) and the Viceland series The Trixie & Katya Show (2017–2018) with co-host and fellow season 7 alum Trixie Mattel. Trixie and Katya often appear together as a popular comedy duo. Katya is a Daytime Emmy Award nominee.

== Early life and education ==
Brian Joseph McCook was born on May 1, 1982, to Pat (née Moran) and Dan McCook. McCook is of Irish descent and was raised Catholic. His father bought him a cheerleader outfit as a child, sparking his interest in dressing up. He described his parents as "accepting" and his father also bought him his first wig. He came out as gay at age 15. He has two siblings. McCook was raised in Marlborough, Massachusetts, and graduated from Marlborough High School in 2000. In a 2019 interview, McCook described growing up as "boring, nondescript, [and] a boiler-plate white suburb". He then attended Boston University for one year before transferring to Massachusetts College of Art and Design, where he studied video and performance art with a minor in psychology, and first became interested in drag.

== Career ==
=== Early drag career ===
McCook created the Russian drag character Yekaterina Petrovna Zamolodchikova in 2006, taking the stage name from a combination of Russian names and one of his favorite gymnasts, Elena Zamolodchikova. When creating his drag character, McCook stated that he was inspired by "female comedians and just funny interesting women like Tracy Ullman, Maria Bamford, Lana Del Rey [and] Amy Sedaris." McCook stated on Drag Race that the Russian-based aspect of his persona was inspired by a professor he had while studying at the Massachusetts College of Art and Design, who "never left the house without a full face of makeup [with] six inch stilettos in the snow." McCook is not of Russian descent, but took several Russian language courses and used a cassette tape called "Pronounce It Perfectly" to master the accent.

As Katya, McCook hosted a monthly drag show called "Perestroika" at Jacques Cabaret. Katya became known on the local drag scene in Boston for performing songs by popular Russian artists such as Alla Pugacheva, t.A.T.u. and Glukoza.

=== RuPaul's Drag Race ===
Katya auditioned for RuPaul's Drag Race on Logo TV four times before being chosen to participate in season 7. She was first seen auditioning for the show back in Season 3's Casting Extravaganza. She won two challenges before being eliminated in episode 11, finishing in fifth place after losing a lip-sync against Kennedy Davenport. The decision to eliminate her was controversial, as she was popular among viewers. During the Season 7 reunion, she was voted Miss Congeniality by fans. On May 16, 2016, Katya appeared at the finale of RuPaul's Drag Race season 8 to crown the next Miss Congeniality: Cynthia Lee Fontaine. On June 17, 2016, Katya was announced as one of the cast members on the second season of RuPaul's Drag Race: All Stars. She placed in the top three times throughout the season, and eventually finished as a runner-up along with fellow contestant Detox.

=== Other projects ===
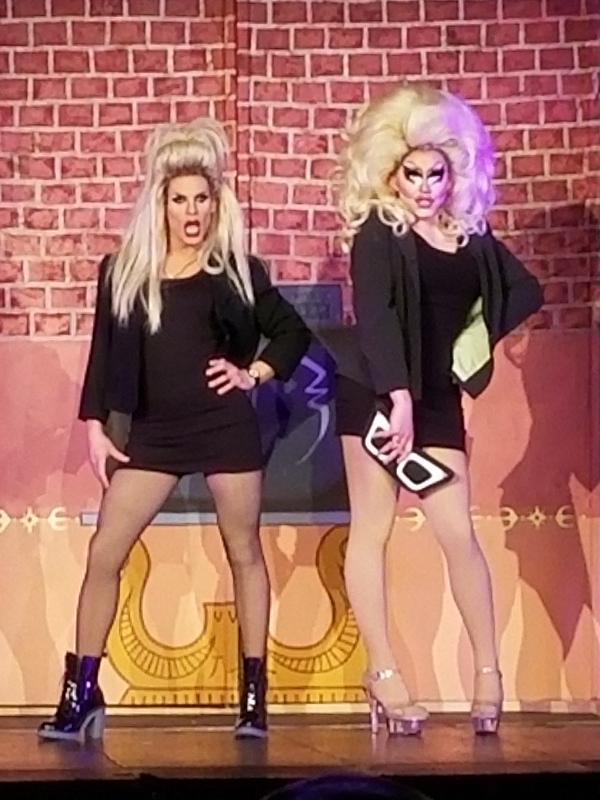
Katya and Trixie Mattel in 2017

==== Web series and digital media ====
McCook launched the YouTube channel welovekatya, where he created several original web series, including RuGRETs, RuFLECTIONS, Drag 101, Total RuCall, and Irregardlessly Trish, an improvised comedy about a Boston hairdresser who lives in a dumpster. He improvises some material and also writes with creative partner Avi Paul Weinstein.

In March 2016, McCook and fellow RuPaul's Drag Race contestant Trixie Mattel debuted UNHhhh, a comedy web series on World of Wonder's YouTube channel. In late 2018, they revived UNHhhh on WOW Presents Plus as well as YouTube. In November 2019, they launched I Like to Watch on Netflix's YouTube channel, in which they react to films and television series available on Netflix.

==== Television and film ====
In August 2017, Viceland announced The Trixie & Katya Show, starring McCook and Mattel, which premiered on November 15, 2017.

The following year, McCook appeared in the comedy film Hurricane Bianca 2: From Russia with Hate, directed by Matt Kugelman and starring fellow drag performer Bianca Del Rio.

In 2026, McCook guest-starred as himself in the eighth episode of the fifth season of Hacks, where he appeared opposite the fictional comedian Deborah Vance, played by Jean Smart.

==== Music ====
In November 2015, McCook appeared on the Christmas Queens album, performing a parody of "The Twelve Days of Christmas". He later appeared on Mattel's album Homemade Christmas, performing on the song "The Night Before Contact".

In October 2020, McCook announced his debut extended play (EP), Vampire Fitness, which was released on November 13.

In September 2026, McCook and drag performer and fellow RuPaul's Drag Race contestant Tatianna released "The Same Parts (10th Anniversary Remix)", a remix of Tatianna's 2016 single "The Same Parts." Two additional remixes by Mattel were released, "Same Parts (feat. KATYA) [Trixie Remix] - Radio Version" and "Same Parts (feat. KATYA) [Trixie Remix] - Extended Version".

==== Live performances ====
In spring 2019, McCook announced the comedy tour Help Me, I'm Dying. The tour was filmed during its run and released as a comedy special of the same name. It premiered on OutTV in Canada in October 2019, became available on demand four months later in February 2020, and aired on Logo TV the following month, on March 4, 2020.

==== Podcasts ====
In 2018, McCook and filmmaker Craig MacNeil launched the podcast Whimsically Volatile. In November 2019, McCook announced on the podcast that he would be leaving the show.

In 2020, McCook and Mattel launched the weekly podcast The Bald and The Beautiful.

In 2024, McCook began hosting the sex-positive podcast Who's the Asshole? for Grindr. Early guests included Orville Peck, Jordan Firstman, Trace Lysette, and Saucy Santana.

==== Writing and publishing ====
On July 14, 2020, McCook and Mattel released their first book together, Trixie and Katya's Guide to Modern Womanhood. Published by Plume Books, it debuted at number two on The New York Times Best Seller list in the "Advice, How-To, and Miscellaneous" category.

The following year, in August 2021, the pair launched the Substack advice newsletter Gooped, which ran for nearly a year before ending in July 2022.

== Personal life ==
McCook was raised Catholic. He has attempted suicide and said, "I think about suicide every day. ... I've spent a ton of my life extremely suicidal." He is gay. He has been a sex worker where he was paid to have sex with men while dressed in drag.

McCook became friends with Brian Firkus (Trixie Mattel) after they starred on the seventh season of RuPaul's Drag Race. Reflecting on their first joint appearance on World of Wonder's Fashion Photo RuView web series, McCook said: "We weren't that close of friends in the beginning, we didn't know that much about each other. It was never pitched as 'two iconic best friends', it actually turned into a close friendship."

McCook has spoken openly about his experiences with substance abuse, including addiction to alcohol, cocaine, and crystal meth. In January 2018, McCook announced a hiatus from drag for mental health reasons, and his comedy tour as Katya, "Help Me, I'm Dying", was postponed until spring 2019. In the first episode of Whimsically Volatile in March 2018, McCook discussed the hiatus in detail. He described suffering a psychotic break after a methamphetamine relapse and briefly returning to live with his family in Massachusetts before entering a rehabilitation center in Arizona. As Katya in a 2022 episode of UNHhhh, McCook shared that he had gotten his tattoos during a manic episode while on drugs but that he did not regret getting them. In April 2024, McCook announced that he would be returning to rehab, postponing upcoming "The Bald and The Beautiful" tour dates.

McCook can speak French, and has occasionally introduced various YouTube videos in French. While he often performs Russian songs, he is not fluent in the language.

In June 2019, a panel assembled by New York magazine ranked McCook 13th on its list of the 100 most powerful drag queens in America, a ranking of former RuPaul's Drag Race contestants.

In December 2020, McCook and Mattel co-hosted the 10th Streamy Awards in Los Angeles.

McCook underwent hip replacement surgery in 2023.

In 2026, McCook spoke out against the mass deportations of immigrants and condemned ICE.

In May 2026, McCook had an emergency abdominal surgery to repair a bowel obstruction. As of September 16, 2026, he has suspended all future projects and events due to recent 'medical complications'. However, as of November 11, 2026, he has reappeared alongside Trixie Mattel for the Netflix Series 'I Like To Watch'.

== Filmography ==
=== Television ===
Year	Title	Role	Notes	Ref.
2011	RuPaul's Drag Race	Herself (in drag)	Season 3 - Episode 1, audition clip	
2015	RuPaul's Drag Race	Herself (in drag)	Season 7 – placed 5th, won Miss Congeniality	
2015	RuPaul's Drag Race: Untucked	Herself (in drag)	Season 7	
2016	RuPaul's Drag Race	Herself (in drag)	Season 8, Episode 10: "Grand Finale"	
2016	Gay for Play Game Show Starring RuPaul	Herself (panelist)	Season 1, Episode 2: "Featuring Amber Rose"	
2016	RuPaul's Drag Race All Stars	Herself (in drag)	Season 2 – Runner-up; Season 8 – Special Guest; Episode: "Carson Kressley, This Is Your Gay Life"	
2017	Playing House	Herself (in drag)	Season 3, Episode 8: "Reverse the Curse"	
2017	Christmas Queens	Herself (in drag)/Trish	Holiday special	
2017	@midnight	Herself (in drag)	Season 4, Episode 121	
2017–2018	The Trixie & Katya Show	Herself (co-host in and out of drag)	Co-host, 9 episodes	
2018	America's Next Top Model	Herself (in drag)	Cycle 24, Episode 6	
2018	RuPaul's Drag Race	Herself (in drag)	Season 10, Episode 1	
2018	Room 104	Ochin'priyatna	Season 2, Episode 3: "Swipe Right"	
2019	Tales of the City	Wedding officiant	Episode 7: "Next Level Sh*t"	
2019	RuPaul's Drag Race UK	Herself (in drag)	Season 1, Episode 6	
2019	Help Me, I'm Dying	Herself (in drag)/Trish	Television comedy special	
2019	EastSiders	Summer Clearance	2 episodes	
2020	AJ and the Queen	Magda	Episode 2: "Pittsburgh"	
2020	Love, Victor	Herself (in drag)	Season 1, Episode 8: "Boys' Trip"	
2021	Full Frontal with Samantha Bee	Herself (in drag)	Season 6, Episode 2	
2021	Lucifer	Drag Queen	Season 6, Episode 2: "Buckets of Baggage"	
2021	The Browns	Matchmaka	Season 2, Episode 5: "Family Function"	
2022	Ziwe	Herself (in drag)	Season 2, Episode 6: "Gay Pride!"	
2022	Trixie Motel	Herself (in drag)	Episode 8: "Pride Grand Opening"	
2022	RuPaul's Secret Celebrity Drag Race	Herself (in drag)	Season 2, Episode 4: "Drag Duet"	
2022	Dr. Jackie: Unlicensed Psychotherapist	Herself (in drag)	Episode 1	
2022	Sketchy Queens	Herself (out of drag)	Episode 3: "Stage Moms Are People Too"	
2022	The Boulet Brothers' Dragula: Titans	Herself (in drag)	Episode 6: "The Ugly Ladies of Wrestling Rematch!"	
2022	From Katya with Love	Herself (co-host)	8 episode reality series on OutTV USA	
2023	The Boulet Brothers' Halfway to Halloween TV Special	Herself (in drag)	Halloween special	
2023	Trixie & Katya Live: The Last Show	Herself (in drag)	Veeps special	
2025	After Midnight	Self (out of drag)	Panelist, Season 2, Episode 51	
2026	Hacks	Herself (in drag)	Season 5, Episode 8: "The Cube"	

=== Web series ===
Year	Title	Role	Notes	Ref.
2015	RuFLECTIONS	Herself (in drag)	Chronicling her time on RuPaul's Drag Race season 7	
2015	RuGRETS	Herself (in drag)	Chronicling her time on RuPaul's Drag Race season 7	
2015	Irregardlessly Trish	Trish	Series following one of her alter-egos, Trish	
2015	Bestie$ for Ca$h	Herself (in drag)	1 episode	
2015	Transformations	Herself (out of drag)	1 episode	
2015	Fashion Photo RuView	Herself (in drag)	Guest co-host for one episode (with Trixie Mattel)	
2015-2016	Whatcha Packin'	Herself (out of drag)	2 episodes	
2016	I'm Not a Doctor, with Dr. Katya	Herself (in drag)	Produced by World of Wonder	
2016	Drag 101	Herself (in drag)		
2016	Total RuCall	Herself (in drag)	Chronicling her time on RuPaul's All Stars Drag Race season 2	
2016–2017	Hey Qween!	Herself (in drag)	2 episodes	
2016–2023	UNHhhh	Herself (co-host in drag)	Produced by World of Wonder, with Trixie Mattel	
2017	Painted by Fame	Herself (out of drag)	1 episode	
2017, 2019–2022	The Pit Stop	Herself (in drag)	6 episodes	
2018	Fashion Photo RuView	Herself (in drag)	Guest co-host for four episodes (with Violet Chachki)	
2019	Exposed	Herself (in drag)	1 episode	
2019	Runway Rewind	Herself (in drag)	Guest co-host for four episodes (with Violet Chachki)	
2019–present	I Like to Watch	Herself (co-host in drag)	Produced by Netflix, with Trixie Mattel	
2020	Trixie and Katya Save the World	Herself (co-host in drag)	Produced by World of Wonder	
2020	10th Annual Streamy Awards	Herself (co-host in drag)	Co-host in drag with Trixie Mattel, aired on YouTube	
2021	Out of the Closet	Herself (out of drag)	1 episode	
2022	Good for You	Herself (in drag)	1 episode	
2023	Sissy That Talk Show	Herself (in drag)	1 episode	
2023	Sissy That Talk Show/The After Show Podcast	Herself (in drag)	1 episode	
2023	Dirty Laundry	Herself (in drag)	Season 3, Episode 3: "Who Came Out to Their High School Girlfriend Via Jesus Christ?"	
2023	I've Had It	Herself (out of drag)	1 episode	
2023	Just Sayin'	Herself (out of drag)	1 episode	
2024	That's Personal!	Herself (in drag)	1 episode	
2024	Very Delta	Herself (in drag)	1 episode	
2024	Tammie Talks	Herself (out of drag)	1 episode	
2024	Raw & Real: The Truth Be Told	Herself (in drag)	1 episode	
2024	The Comment Section	Herself (out of drag)	1 episode	
2025	The Kelly Mantle Show	Herself (out of drag)	1 episode	
2025	RnR with Courtney Act	Herself (out of drag)	1 episode	
2025	Criterion Closet Picks	Herself (out of drag)	1 episode	
2025	GymCastic	Herself (out of drag)	1 episode	
2025	Amy's Dead-End Dreamhouse	Herself (in drag)	1 episode	
2025	Wild Wild Web	Herself (out of drag)	1 episode	
2025	Monet Talks	Herself (out of drag)	1 episode	
2026	Boyfriend Material with Harry Jowsey	Herself (out of drag)	1 episode	
2026	Very Important People	Herself (out of drag), Linda Elizabeth Marie Baintree	Season 3, Episode 12: "Linda Elizabeth Marie Braintree"	

=== Film ===
Year	Title	Role	Notes	Ref.
2016	Redmond Hand, Private Dick	Informant	Short film	
2017	Sebastian	Xenia		
2018	Hurricane Bianca 2: From Russia with Hate	Katya/Mitya		
2018	The Quiet Room	David	Short film	
2019	Trixie Mattel: Moving Parts	Herself	Documentary	
2019	The Queens	Herself	Documentary	
2019	Ru's Angels	The Wig Snatcher	Short film	

=== Podcast series ===
Year	Title	Role	Ref.
2018-2019	Whimsically Volatile	Herself	
2020–present	The Bald and the Beautiful	Herself	
2021	Hot White Heist	Sorokin	
2024–present	Who's the A**hole?	Host/Herself	
2024	Hot White Heist 2	Sorokin	

=== Music videos ===
Year	Title	Other artists
2015	"Drag U"	RuPaul
2015	"12 Days of Christmas"	
2016	"Thigh High"	Electric Street Queens
2020	"Come in Brazil"	Alaska Thunderfuck
2020	"Ding Dong!"	Trixie Mattel
2020	"Be Your Own Dentist"	
2022	"Muscle Queen"	Vigiletti and Yangabang
2024	"O mio babbino caro"	Sapphira Cristál

== Discography ==
=== Extended plays ===
Title	Details
Vampire Fitness	Released: November 13, 2020; Label: Producer Entertainment Group; Formats: CD, vinyl, digital download, streaming
Vampire Fitness (Remixed)	Released: April 23, 2021; Label: Producer Entertainment Group; Formats: Digital download, streaming

=== Singles ===
==== As lead artist ====
Title	Year	Album
"Come in Brazil" (featuring Alaska Thunderfuck)	2020	Vampire Fitness
"Ding Dong!"(Vigiletti Remix) (featuring Trixie Mattel)	2021	Vampire Fitness (Remixed)

==== As featured artist ====
Title	Year	Peak chart positions	Album
Title	Year	US Comedy Digital	Album
"Read U Wrote U" (RuPaul featuring the Cast of RuPaul's Drag Race All Stars season 2)	2016	—	Non-album single
"The Night Before Contact" (Trixie Mattel featuring Katya Zamolodchikova)	2017	5	Homemade Christmas
"The Same Parts (10th Anniversary Remix)" (Tatianna, KATYA)	2026	—	Non-album single, remix
"Same Parts (feat. KATYA) [Trixie Remix] - Radio Version" (Tatianna, Trixie Mattel, KATYA)	2026	—	Non-album single, remix
"Same Parts (feat. KATYA) [Trixie Remix] - Extended Version" (Tatianna, Trixie Mattel, KATYA)	2026	—	Non-album single, remix

=== Guest appearances ===
Title	Year	Other artist(s)	Album	Ref.
"Drag U"	2015	RuPaul	RuPaul Presents: CoverGurlz 2	
"12 Days of Christmas"	2015	—N/a	Christmas Queens	
"Merry Christmas, It's Whateva" (as Trish)	2016	—N/a	Christmas Queens 2	
"Bossa Nova Christmas in Outer Space"	2016	Jackie Beat	Christmas Queens 2	
"Dreidel, Dreidel, Dreidel"	2017	Jackie Beat	Christmas Queens 3	
"I.D.F.T. (The Secret Track)"	2021	Leigh Allyce Canali	Light and Dark	
"Random Ru Girl"	2021	Ginger Minj, Stacy Layne Matthews and Eureka O'Hara	Gummy Bear	

== Awards and nominations ==
=== Daytime Emmy Awards ===
Year	Award	Nominated work	Result	Ref.
2020	Outstanding Makeup	EastSiders	Nominated	

=== Queerty Awards ===
Year	Award	Nominated work	Result	Ref.
2020	Drag Royalty	Herself	Won	
2021	Podcast	The Bald and the Beautiful	Won	
2022	Podcast	The Bald and the Beautiful	Runner-up	
2023	Best Read	Working Girls: Trixie and Katya's Guide to Professional Womanhood	Won	
2024	Web Series	UNHhhh	Runner-up	

=== Streamy Awards ===
Year	Award	Nominated work	Result	Ref.
2017	Show of the Year	UNHhhh	Nominated	
2019	Unscripted Series	UNHhhh	Nominated	
2020	Unscripted Series	UNHhhh	Won	
2020	Show of the Year	UNHhhh	Nominated	
2021	Show of the Year	UNHhhh	Nominated	
2021	Unscripted Series	UNHhhh	Nominated	
2022	Unscripted Series	UNHhhh	Nominated	
2022	Editing	UNHhhh	Nominated	
2022	Show of the Year	UNHhhh	Nominated	
2023	Show of the Year	UNHhhh	Nominated	

=== Webby Awards ===
Year	Award	Nominated work	Result	Ref.
Webby Awards
2022	Podcasts, Best Podcast Ad	The Bald and the Beautiful	Won	
2023	Social, Television & Film (Video)	I Like To Watch	Won	
2024	Social, Television & Film	I Like To Watch	Won	
2024	Podcasts, Comedy	The Bald and the Beautiful	Won	
2025	Podcasts, Comedy	The Bald and the Beautiful	Won	
People's Voice
2022	Podcasts, Best Podcast Ad	The Bald and the Beautiful with Trixie and Katya	Won	
2022	Social, Arts & Entertainment (Video)	I Like To Watch	Won	
2023	Social, Television & Film (Video)	I Like To Watch	Won	

=== WOWIE Awards ===
Year	Award	Nominated work	Result	Ref.
2018	Best Podcast	Whimsically Volatile	Won	
2020	Outstanding Actor	Love, Victor	Nominated	

=== Miscellaneous awards and honors ===
Year	Organization	Award	Nominated work	Result	Ref.
2021	Canadian Podcast Awards	Outstanding Foreign Series	The Bald and the Beautiful	Won	
2023	Signal Awards	Best Video Podcast	The Bald and the Beautiful	Bronze	
2023	Signal Awards	Best Co-Host Team	The Bald and the Beautiful	Gold	
2023	Signal Awards	Best "Stan" Podcast	The Bald and the Beautiful	Silver	
2023	Signal Awards	Best LGBTQ+ Podcast	The Bald and the Beautiful	Silver	
2023	Shorty Awards	Comedy Podcast	The Bald and the Beautiful	Audience Honor	
2023	GLAAD Media Awards	Outstanding Podcast	The Bald and the Beautiful	Nominated	
2026	GLAAD Media Awards	Outstanding Podcast	The Bald and the Beautiful	Pending	

== Bibliography ==
- Trixie and Katya's Guide to Modern Womanhood. Plume. 2020. ISBN 9780593086704.
- Working Girls: Trixie and Katya's Guide to Professional Womanhood. Plume. 2022. ISBN 9780593186114.
