= Battle of the Seasons (tour) =

Drag tour

- Drag tour by RuPaul's Drag Race contestants

Battle of the Seasons was a drag tour featuring RuPaul's Drag Race contestants produced by Producer Entertainment Group and Sidecar Management, in collaboration with Logo TV and World of Wonder.

== History ==
The 2015 edition was called "Condragulations" The tour incorporated a rotating cast of former Drag Race contestants such as season two contestant Pandora Boxx, season three contestants Manila Luzon and Raja, season four contestants Jiggly Caliente and Sharon Needles, season five contestants Alaska Thunderfuck, Detox, Ivy Winters and Jinkx Monsoon and season six contestants Bianca Del Rio, Darienne Lake, BenDeLaCreme and Courtney Act, joined by Drag Race judge Michelle Visage as host.

In 2016, the North American leg, called "Extravaganza", featured a rotating cast including Adore Delano, Alaska Thunderfuck, Courtney Act, Jinkx Monsoon, Katya, Miss Fame, Pandora Boxx, Sharon Needles, Violet Chachki, and Willam with Michelle Visage returning as host. The 2016 tour stopped in 60 cities in total across Europe and North America, with select dates featuring an opening DJ set by Pearl.

=== Tour dates ===
Date	City	Country	Venue	Host	Performers
North America 2014
April 22, 2014	Atlanta	United States	Center Stage	Michelle Visage	Carmen Carrera; Ivy Winters; Jinkx Monsoon; Pandora Boxx; Phi Phi O'Hara; Mimi Imfurst (DJ set); Sharon Needles
April 23, 2014	New Orleans	United States	Civic Theatre	Michelle Visage	Carmen Carrera; Ivy Winters; Jinkx Monsoon; Pandora Boxx; Phi Phi O'Hara; Mimi Imfurst (DJ set); Sharon Needles
April 24, 2014	Kansas City, Missouri	United States	Uptown Theater	Michelle Visage	Carmen Carrera; Ivy Winters; Jinkx Monsoon; Pandora Boxx; Phi Phi O'Hara; Mimi Imfurst (DJ set); Sharon Needles
April 26, 2014	Knoxville	United States	NV Nightclub	Michelle Visage	Carmen Carrera; Ivy Winters; Jinkx Monsoon; Pandora Boxx; Phi Phi O'Hara; Mimi Imfurst (DJ set); Sharon Needles
April 27, 2014	Louisville	United States	Headliners	Michelle Visage	Carmen Carrera; Ivy Winters; Jinkx Monsoon; Pandora Boxx; Phi Phi O'Hara; Mimi Imfurst (DJ set); Sharon Needles
April 29, 2014	Milwaukee	United States	Turner Hall Ballroom	Michelle Visage	Carmen Carrera; Ivy Winters; Jinkx Monsoon; Pandora Boxx; Phi Phi O'Hara; Mimi Imfurst (DJ set); Sharon Needles
April 30, 2014	Des Moines	United States	Wooly's	Michelle Visage	Carmen Carrera; Ivy Winters; Jinkx Monsoon; Pandora Boxx; Phi Phi O'Hara; Mimi Imfurst (DJ set); Sharon Needles
May 1, 2014	Salt Lake City	United States	The Depot	Michelle Visage	Carmen Carrera; Ivy Winters; Jinkx Monsoon; Pandora Boxx; Phi Phi O'Hara; Mimi Imfurst (DJ set); Sharon Needles
May 2, 2014	Fargo	United States	Concert Hall at the Venue	Michelle Visage	Carmen Carrera; Ivy Winters; Jinkx Monsoon; Pandora Boxx; Phi Phi O'Hara; Mimi Imfurst (DJ set); Sharon Needles
North America 2015
February 1, 2015	Las Vegas	United States	House of Blues	Michelle Visage	Adore Delano; Alaska Thunderfuck; BenDeLaCreme; Bianca Del Rio; Courtney Act; Darienne Lake; Detox; Ivy Winters; Jiggly Caliente; Jinkx Monsoon; Manila Luzon; Pandora Boxx; Phi Phi O'Hara; Raja; Sharon Needles
February 3, 2015	Tucson	United States	Rialto Theatre	Michelle Visage	Adore Delano; Alaska Thunderfuck; BenDeLaCreme; Bianca Del Rio; Courtney Act; Darienne Lake; Detox; Ivy Winters; Jiggly Caliente; Jinkx Monsoon; Manila Luzon; Pandora Boxx; Phi Phi O'Hara; Raja; Sharon Needles
February 4, 2015	Los Angeles	United States	Belasco Theatre	Michelle Visage	Adore Delano; Alaska Thunderfuck; BenDeLaCreme; Bianca Del Rio; Courtney Act; Darienne Lake; Detox; Ivy Winters; Jiggly Caliente; Jinkx Monsoon; Manila Luzon; Pandora Boxx; Phi Phi O'Hara; Raja; Sharon Needles
February 5, 2015	San Diego	United States	House of Blues	Michelle Visage	Adore Delano; Alaska Thunderfuck; BenDeLaCreme; Bianca Del Rio; Courtney Act; Darienne Lake; Detox; Ivy Winters; Jiggly Caliente; Jinkx Monsoon; Manila Luzon; Pandora Boxx; Phi Phi O'Hara; Raja; Sharon Needles
February 7, 2015	San Francisco	United States	Regency Ballroom	Michelle Visage	Adore Delano; Alaska Thunderfuck; BenDeLaCreme; Bianca Del Rio; Courtney Act; Darienne Lake; Detox; Ivy Winters; Jiggly Caliente; Jinkx Monsoon; Manila Luzon; Pandora Boxx; Phi Phi O'Hara; Raja; Sharon Needles
February 10, 2015	Portland, Oregon	United States	Crystal Ballroom	Michelle Visage	Adore Delano; Alaska Thunderfuck; BenDeLaCreme; Bianca Del Rio; Courtney Act; Darienne Lake; Detox; Ivy Winters; Jiggly Caliente; Jinkx Monsoon; Manila Luzon; Pandora Boxx; Phi Phi O'Hara; Raja; Sharon Needles
February 11, 2015	Seattle	United States	Showbox 5000	Michelle Visage	Adore Delano; Alaska Thunderfuck; BenDeLaCreme; Bianca Del Rio; Courtney Act; Darienne Lake; Detox; Ivy Winters; Jiggly Caliente; Jinkx Monsoon; Manila Luzon; Pandora Boxx; Phi Phi O'Hara; Raja; Sharon Needles
February 13, 2015	Calgary	Canada	Flames Central	Michelle Visage	Adore Delano; Alaska Thunderfuck; BenDeLaCreme; Bianca Del Rio; Courtney Act; Darienne Lake; Detox; Ivy Winters; Jiggly Caliente; Jinkx Monsoon; Manila Luzon; Pandora Boxx; Phi Phi O'Hara; Raja; Sharon Needles
February 15, 2015	Edmonton	Canada	Encore	Michelle Visage	Adore Delano; Alaska Thunderfuck; BenDeLaCreme; Bianca Del Rio; Courtney Act; Darienne Lake; Detox; Ivy Winters; Jiggly Caliente; Jinkx Monsoon; Manila Luzon; Pandora Boxx; Phi Phi O'Hara; Raja; Sharon Needles
February 16, 2015	Minneapolis	United States	Hill City Heights	Michelle Visage	Adore Delano; Alaska Thunderfuck; BenDeLaCreme; Bianca Del Rio; Courtney Act; Darienne Lake; Detox; Ivy Winters; Jiggly Caliente; Jinkx Monsoon; Manila Luzon; Pandora Boxx; Phi Phi O'Hara; Raja; Sharon Needles
February 17, 2015	Madison	United States	Majestic Theatre	Michelle Visage	Adore Delano; Alaska Thunderfuck; BenDeLaCreme; Bianca Del Rio; Courtney Act; Darienne Lake; Detox; Ivy Winters; Jiggly Caliente; Jinkx Monsoon; Manila Luzon; Pandora Boxx; Phi Phi O'Hara; Raja; Sharon Needles
February 19, 2015	Chicago	United States	House of Blues	Michelle Visage	Adore Delano; Alaska Thunderfuck; BenDeLaCreme; Bianca Del Rio; Courtney Act; Darienne Lake; Detox; Ivy Winters; Jiggly Caliente; Jinkx Monsoon; Manila Luzon; Pandora Boxx; Phi Phi O'Hara; Raja; Sharon Needles
February 20, 2015	Cleveland	United States	Connor Palace	Michelle Visage	Adore Delano; Alaska Thunderfuck; BenDeLaCreme; Bianca Del Rio; Courtney Act; Darienne Lake; Detox; Ivy Winters; Jiggly Caliente; Jinkx Monsoon; Manila Luzon; Pandora Boxx; Phi Phi O'Hara; Raja; Sharon Needles
February 24, 2015	Pittsburgh	United States	Byham Theater	Michelle Visage	Adore Delano; Alaska Thunderfuck; BenDeLaCreme; Bianca Del Rio; Courtney Act; Darienne Lake; Detox; Ivy Winters; Jiggly Caliente; Jinkx Monsoon; Manila Luzon; Pandora Boxx; Phi Phi O'Hara; Raja; Sharon Needles
February 27, 2015	Toronto	Canada	Danforth Music Hall	Michelle Visage	Adore Delano; Alaska Thunderfuck; BenDeLaCreme; Bianca Del Rio; Courtney Act; Darienne Lake; Detox; Ivy Winters; Jiggly Caliente; Jinkx Monsoon; Manila Luzon; Pandora Boxx; Phi Phi O'Hara; Raja; Sharon Needles
February 28, 2015	Montreal	Canada	Olympia Theatre	Michelle Visage	Adore Delano; Alaska Thunderfuck; BenDeLaCreme; Bianca Del Rio; Courtney Act; Darienne Lake; Detox; Ivy Winters; Jiggly Caliente; Jinkx Monsoon; Manila Luzon; Pandora Boxx; Phi Phi O'Hara; Raja; Sharon Needles
March 2, 2015	Portland, Maine	United States	State Theatre	Michelle Visage	Adore Delano; Alaska Thunderfuck; BenDeLaCreme; Bianca Del Rio; Courtney Act; Darienne Lake; Detox; Ivy Winters; Jiggly Caliente; Jinkx Monsoon; Manila Luzon; Pandora Boxx; Phi Phi O'Hara; Raja; Sharon Needles
March 3, 2015	Boston	United States	Royale	Michelle Visage	Adore Delano; Alaska Thunderfuck; BenDeLaCreme; Bianca Del Rio; Courtney Act; Darienne Lake; Detox; Ivy Winters; Jiggly Caliente; Jinkx Monsoon; Manila Luzon; Pandora Boxx; Phi Phi O'Hara; Raja; Sharon Needles
March 5, 2015	New York City	United States	Irving Palace	Michelle Visage	Adore Delano; Alaska Thunderfuck; BenDeLaCreme; Bianca Del Rio; Courtney Act; Darienne Lake; Detox; Ivy Winters; Jiggly Caliente; Jinkx Monsoon; Manila Luzon; Pandora Boxx; Phi Phi O'Hara; Raja; Sharon Needles
March 7, 2015	Philadelphia	United States	Trocadero Theatre	Michelle Visage	Adore Delano; Alaska Thunderfuck; BenDeLaCreme; Bianca Del Rio; Courtney Act; Darienne Lake; Detox; Ivy Winters; Jiggly Caliente; Jinkx Monsoon; Manila Luzon; Pandora Boxx; Phi Phi O'Hara; Raja; Sharon Needles
March 8, 2015	Washington, D.C.	United States	9:30 Club	Michelle Visage	Adore Delano; Alaska Thunderfuck; BenDeLaCreme; Bianca Del Rio; Courtney Act; Darienne Lake; Detox; Ivy Winters; Jiggly Caliente; Jinkx Monsoon; Manila Luzon; Pandora Boxx; Phi Phi O'Hara; Raja; Sharon Needles
March 11, 2015	Charlotte	United States	Amos' Southend	Michelle Visage	Adore Delano; Alaska Thunderfuck; BenDeLaCreme; Bianca Del Rio; Courtney Act; Darienne Lake; Detox; Ivy Winters; Jiggly Caliente; Jinkx Monsoon; Manila Luzon; Pandora Boxx; Phi Phi O'Hara; Raja; Sharon Needles
March 13, 2015	Louisville	United States	Headliners	Michelle Visage	Adore Delano; Alaska Thunderfuck; BenDeLaCreme; Bianca Del Rio; Courtney Act; Darienne Lake; Detox; Ivy Winters; Jiggly Caliente; Jinkx Monsoon; Manila Luzon; Pandora Boxx; Phi Phi O'Hara; Raja; Sharon Needles
March 14, 2015	Indianapolis	United States	Egyptian Room	Michelle Visage	Adore Delano; Alaska Thunderfuck; BenDeLaCreme; Bianca Del Rio; Courtney Act; Darienne Lake; Detox; Ivy Winters; Jiggly Caliente; Jinkx Monsoon; Manila Luzon; Pandora Boxx; Phi Phi O'Hara; Raja; Sharon Needles
March 15, 2015	Des Moines	United States	Wooly's	Michelle Visage	Adore Delano; Alaska Thunderfuck; BenDeLaCreme; Bianca Del Rio; Courtney Act; Darienne Lake; Detox; Ivy Winters; Jiggly Caliente; Jinkx Monsoon; Manila Luzon; Pandora Boxx; Phi Phi O'Hara; Raja; Sharon Needles
March 18, 2015	Columbia, Missouri	United States	The Blue Note	Michelle Visage	Adore Delano; Alaska Thunderfuck; BenDeLaCreme; Bianca Del Rio; Courtney Act; Darienne Lake; Detox; Ivy Winters; Jiggly Caliente; Jinkx Monsoon; Manila Luzon; Pandora Boxx; Phi Phi O'Hara; Raja; Sharon Needles
March 19, 2015	Lincoln	United States	Bourbon Theatre	Michelle Visage	Adore Delano; Alaska Thunderfuck; BenDeLaCreme; Bianca Del Rio; Courtney Act; Darienne Lake; Detox; Ivy Winters; Jiggly Caliente; Jinkx Monsoon; Manila Luzon; Pandora Boxx; Phi Phi O'Hara; Raja; Sharon Needles
March 20, 2015	Kansas City, Missouri	United States	Uptown Theater	Michelle Visage	Adore Delano; Alaska Thunderfuck; BenDeLaCreme; Bianca Del Rio; Courtney Act; Darienne Lake; Detox; Ivy Winters; Jiggly Caliente; Jinkx Monsoon; Manila Luzon; Pandora Boxx; Phi Phi O'Hara; Raja; Sharon Needles
March 21, 2015	Springfield	United States	Gillioz Theatre	Michelle Visage	Adore Delano; Alaska Thunderfuck; BenDeLaCreme; Bianca Del Rio; Courtney Act; Darienne Lake; Detox; Ivy Winters; Jiggly Caliente; Jinkx Monsoon; Manila Luzon; Pandora Boxx; Phi Phi O'Hara; Raja; Sharon Needles
March 24, 2015	Dallas	United States	Southside Music Hall	Michelle Visage	Adore Delano; Alaska Thunderfuck; BenDeLaCreme; Bianca Del Rio; Courtney Act; Darienne Lake; Detox; Ivy Winters; Jiggly Caliente; Jinkx Monsoon; Manila Luzon; Pandora Boxx; Phi Phi O'Hara; Raja; Sharon Needles
March 27, 2015	New Orleans	United States	Civic Theatre	Michelle Visage	Adore Delano; Alaska Thunderfuck; BenDeLaCreme; Bianca Del Rio; Courtney Act; Darienne Lake; Detox; Ivy Winters; Jiggly Caliente; Jinkx Monsoon; Manila Luzon; Pandora Boxx; Phi Phi O'Hara; Raja; Sharon Needles
March 28, 2015	Atlanta	United States	Center Stage	Michelle Visage	Adore Delano; Alaska Thunderfuck; BenDeLaCreme; Bianca Del Rio; Courtney Act; Darienne Lake; Detox; Ivy Winters; Jiggly Caliente; Jinkx Monsoon; Manila Luzon; Pandora Boxx; Phi Phi O'Hara; Raja; Sharon Needles
March 31, 2015	Tampa	United States	The Ritz	Michelle Visage	Adore Delano; Alaska Thunderfuck; BenDeLaCreme; Bianca Del Rio; Courtney Act; Darienne Lake; Detox; Ivy Winters; Jiggly Caliente; Jinkx Monsoon; Manila Luzon; Pandora Boxx; Phi Phi O'Hara; Raja; Sharon Needles
April 1, 2015	Orlando	United States	The Plaza	Michelle Visage	Adore Delano; Alaska Thunderfuck; BenDeLaCreme; Bianca Del Rio; Courtney Act; Darienne Lake; Detox; Ivy Winters; Jiggly Caliente; Jinkx Monsoon; Manila Luzon; Pandora Boxx; Phi Phi O'Hara; Raja; Sharon Needles
April 2, 2015	Ft. Lauderdale	United States	Culture Room	Michelle Visage	Adore Delano; Alaska Thunderfuck; BenDeLaCreme; Bianca Del Rio; Courtney Act; Darienne Lake; Detox; Ivy Winters; Jiggly Caliente; Jinkx Monsoon; Manila Luzon; Pandora Boxx; Phi Phi O'Hara; Raja; Sharon Needles
Europe 2016				Michelle Visage	Adore Delano; Alaska Thunderfuck; BenDeLaCreme; Bianca Del Rio; Courtney Act; Darienne Lake; Detox; Ivy Winters; Jiggly Caliente; Jinkx Monsoon; Manila Luzon; Pandora Boxx; Phi Phi O'Hara; Raja; Sharon Needles
March 17, 2016	Antwerp	Belgium	Stadsschouwburg	Michelle Visage	Courtney Act; Jinkx Monsoon; Katya; Pandora Boxx; Sharon Needles; Violet Chachki; Willam
March 20, 2016	Glasgow	Scotland	O2 ABC Glasgow	Michelle Visage	Courtney Act; Jinkx Monsoon; Katya; Pandora Boxx; Sharon Needles; Violet Chachki; Willam
March 22, 2016	Dublin	Republic of Ireland	Olympia Theatre	Michelle Visage	Courtney Act; Jinkx Monsoon; Katya; Pandora Boxx; Sharon Needles; Violet Chachki; Willam
March 24, 2016	Manchester	England	O2 Ritz	Michelle Visage	Courtney Act; Jinkx Monsoon; Katya; Pandora Boxx; Sharon Needles; Violet Chachki; Willam
March 25, 2016	London	England	O2 Forum Kentish Town	Michelle Visage	Courtney Act; Jinkx Monsoon; Katya; Pandora Boxx; Sharon Needles; Violet Chachki; Willam
March 27, 2016	Birmingham	England	O2 Institute	Michelle Visage	Courtney Act; Jinkx Monsoon; Katya; Pandora Boxx; Sharon Needles; Violet Chachki; Willam
March 28, 2016	Cardiff	Wales	Tramshed	Michelle Visage	Courtney Act; Jinkx Monsoon; Katya; Pandora Boxx; Sharon Needles; Violet Chachki; Willam
March 31, 2016	Oslo	Norway	Sentrum Scene	Michelle Visage	Courtney Act; Jinkx Monsoon; Katya; Pandora Boxx; Sharon Needles; Violet Chachki; Willam
April 1, 2016	Copenhagen	Denmark	Vega	Michelle Visage	Courtney Act; Jinkx Monsoon; Katya; Pandora Boxx; Sharon Needles; Violet Chachki; Willam
April 2, 2016	Paris	France	Le Trianon	Michelle Visage	Courtney Act; Jinkx Monsoon; Katya; Pandora Boxx; Sharon Needles; Violet Chachki; Willam
April 3, 2016	Berlin	Germany	Admiral Palace	Michelle Visage	Courtney Act; Jinkx Monsoon; Katya; Pandora Boxx; Sharon Needles; Violet Chachki; Willam
April 5, 2016	Amsterdam	Netherlands	Melkweg	Michelle Visage	Courtney Act; Jinkx Monsoon; Katya; Pandora Boxx; Sharon Needles; Violet Chachki; Willam
April 9, 2016	Barcelona	Spain	Razzmatazz	Michelle Visage	Courtney Act; Jinkx Monsoon; Katya; Pandora Boxx; Sharon Needles; Violet Chachki; Willam
April 10, 2016	Madrid	Spain	Joy Eslava	Michelle Visage	Courtney Act; Jinkx Monsoon; Katya; Pandora Boxx; Sharon Needles; Violet Chachki; Willam
North America 2016
April 19, 2016	Seattle	United States	Showbox SoDo	Michelle Visage	Adore Delano; Alaska Thunderfuck; BenDeLaCreme; Courtney Act; Ginger Minj; Ivy Winters; Jinkx Monsoon; Katya; Manila Luzon; Miss Fame; Pearl (DJ set); Phi Phi O'Hara; Sharon Needles; Violet Chachki
April 20, 2016	Portland	United States	Revolution Hall	Michelle Visage	Adore Delano; Alaska Thunderfuck; BenDeLaCreme; Courtney Act; Ginger Minj; Ivy Winters; Jinkx Monsoon; Katya; Manila Luzon; Miss Fame; Pearl (DJ set); Phi Phi O'Hara; Sharon Needles; Violet Chachki
April 21, 2016	San Francisco	United States	Regency Ballroom	Michelle Visage	Adore Delano; Alaska Thunderfuck; BenDeLaCreme; Courtney Act; Ginger Minj; Ivy Winters; Jinkx Monsoon; Katya; Manila Luzon; Miss Fame; Pearl (DJ set); Phi Phi O'Hara; Sharon Needles; Violet Chachki
April 22, 2016	Anaheim	United States	The Grove	Michelle Visage	Adore Delano; Alaska Thunderfuck; BenDeLaCreme; Courtney Act; Ginger Minj; Ivy Winters; Jinkx Monsoon; Katya; Manila Luzon; Miss Fame; Pearl (DJ set); Phi Phi O'Hara; Sharon Needles; Violet Chachki
April 24, 2016	San Diego	United States	Observatory North Park	Michelle Visage	Adore Delano; Alaska Thunderfuck; BenDeLaCreme; Courtney Act; Ginger Minj; Ivy Winters; Jinkx Monsoon; Katya; Manila Luzon; Miss Fame; Pearl (DJ set); Phi Phi O'Hara; Sharon Needles; Violet Chachki
April 26, 2016	Tucson	United States	Rialto Theatre	Michelle Visage	Adore Delano; Alaska Thunderfuck; BenDeLaCreme; Courtney Act; Ginger Minj; Ivy Winters; Jinkx Monsoon; Katya; Manila Luzon; Miss Fame; Pearl (DJ set); Phi Phi O'Hara; Sharon Needles; Violet Chachki
April 27, 2016	Phoenix	United States	Celebrity Theatre	Michelle Visage	Adore Delano; Alaska Thunderfuck; BenDeLaCreme; Courtney Act; Ginger Minj; Ivy Winters; Jinkx Monsoon; Katya; Manila Luzon; Miss Fame; Pearl (DJ set); Phi Phi O'Hara; Sharon Needles; Violet Chachki
April 29, 2016	Las Vegas	United States	The Pearl	Michelle Visage	Adore Delano; Alaska Thunderfuck; BenDeLaCreme; Courtney Act; Ginger Minj; Ivy Winters; Jinkx Monsoon; Katya; Manila Luzon; Miss Fame; Pearl (DJ set); Phi Phi O'Hara; Sharon Needles; Violet Chachki
April 30, 2016	Salt Lake City	United States	The Depot	Michelle Visage	Adore Delano; Alaska Thunderfuck; BenDeLaCreme; Courtney Act; Ginger Minj; Ivy Winters; Jinkx Monsoon; Katya; Manila Luzon; Miss Fame; Pearl (DJ set); Phi Phi O'Hara; Sharon Needles; Violet Chachki
May 1, 2016	Denver	United States	Ogden Theatre	Michelle Visage	Adore Delano; Alaska Thunderfuck; BenDeLaCreme; Courtney Act; Ginger Minj; Ivy Winters; Jinkx Monsoon; Katya; Manila Luzon; Miss Fame; Pearl (DJ set); Phi Phi O'Hara; Sharon Needles; Violet Chachki
May 10, 2016	Orlando	United States	The Plaza Live	Michelle Visage	Adore Delano; Alaska Thunderfuck; BenDeLaCreme; Courtney Act; Ginger Minj; Ivy Winters; Jinkx Monsoon; Katya; Manila Luzon; Miss Fame; Pearl (DJ set); Phi Phi O'Hara; Sharon Needles; Violet Chachki
May 11, 2016	Ft. Lauderdale	United States	Parker Playhouse	Michelle Visage	Adore Delano; Alaska Thunderfuck; BenDeLaCreme; Courtney Act; Ginger Minj; Ivy Winters; Jinkx Monsoon; Katya; Manila Luzon; Miss Fame; Pearl (DJ set); Phi Phi O'Hara; Sharon Needles; Violet Chachki
May 13, 2016	Atlanta	United States	Buckhead Theatre	Michelle Visage	Adore Delano; Alaska Thunderfuck; BenDeLaCreme; Courtney Act; Ginger Minj; Ivy Winters; Jinkx Monsoon; Katya; Manila Luzon; Miss Fame; Pearl (DJ set); Phi Phi O'Hara; Sharon Needles; Violet Chachki
May 14, 2016	Ponte Vedra Beach	United States	Ponte Vedra Concert Hall	Michelle Visage	Adore Delano; Alaska Thunderfuck; BenDeLaCreme; Courtney Act; Ginger Minj; Ivy Winters; Jinkx Monsoon; Katya; Manila Luzon; Miss Fame; Pearl (DJ set); Phi Phi O'Hara; Sharon Needles; Violet Chachki
May 15, 2016	Tampa	United States	The Ritz Ybor	Michelle Visage	Adore Delano; Alaska Thunderfuck; BenDeLaCreme; Courtney Act; Ginger Minj; Ivy Winters; Jinkx Monsoon; Katya; Manila Luzon; Miss Fame; Pearl (DJ set); Phi Phi O'Hara; Sharon Needles; Violet Chachki
May 17, 2016	Columbia	United States	The Music Farm	Michelle Visage	Adore Delano; Alaska Thunderfuck; BenDeLaCreme; Courtney Act; Ginger Minj; Ivy Winters; Jinkx Monsoon; Katya; Manila Luzon; Miss Fame; Pearl (DJ set); Phi Phi O'Hara; Sharon Needles; Violet Chachki
May 18, 2016	Charlotte	United States	Amos' Southend	Michelle Visage	Adore Delano; Alaska Thunderfuck; BenDeLaCreme; Courtney Act; Ginger Minj; Ivy Winters; Jinkx Monsoon; Katya; Manila Luzon; Miss Fame; Pearl (DJ set); Phi Phi O'Hara; Sharon Needles; Violet Chachki
May 20, 2016	Richmond	United States	The National	Michelle Visage	Adore Delano; Alaska Thunderfuck; BenDeLaCreme; Courtney Act; Ginger Minj; Ivy Winters; Jinkx Monsoon; Katya; Manila Luzon; Miss Fame; Pearl (DJ set); Phi Phi O'Hara; Sharon Needles; Violet Chachki
May 21, 2016	Washington, D.C.	United States	9:30 Club	Michelle Visage	Adore Delano; Alaska Thunderfuck; BenDeLaCreme; Courtney Act; Ginger Minj; Ivy Winters; Jinkx Monsoon; Katya; Manila Luzon; Miss Fame; Pearl (DJ set); Phi Phi O'Hara; Sharon Needles; Violet Chachki
May 22, 2016	Durham	United States	Durham PAC	Michelle Visage	Adore Delano; Alaska Thunderfuck; BenDeLaCreme; Courtney Act; Ginger Minj; Ivy Winters; Jinkx Monsoon; Katya; Manila Luzon; Miss Fame; Pearl (DJ set); Phi Phi O'Hara; Sharon Needles; Violet Chachki
May 24, 2016	Boston	United States	Royale	Michelle Visage	Adore Delano; Alaska Thunderfuck; BenDeLaCreme; Courtney Act; Ginger Minj; Ivy Winters; Jinkx Monsoon; Katya; Manila Luzon; Miss Fame; Pearl (DJ set); Phi Phi O'Hara; Sharon Needles; Violet Chachki
May 25, 2016	New York City	United States	PlayStation Theater	Michelle Visage	Adore Delano; Alaska Thunderfuck; BenDeLaCreme; Courtney Act; Ginger Minj; Ivy Winters; Jinkx Monsoon; Katya; Manila Luzon; Miss Fame; Pearl (DJ set); Phi Phi O'Hara; Sharon Needles; Violet Chachki
May 27, 2016	Toronto	Canada	Danforth Music Hall	Michelle Visage	Adore Delano; Alaska Thunderfuck; BenDeLaCreme; Courtney Act; Ginger Minj; Ivy Winters; Jinkx Monsoon; Katya; Manila Luzon; Miss Fame; Pearl (DJ set); Phi Phi O'Hara; Sharon Needles; Violet Chachki
May 28, 2016	Montreal	Canada	Métropolis	Michelle Visage	Adore Delano; Alaska Thunderfuck; BenDeLaCreme; Courtney Act; Ginger Minj; Ivy Winters; Jinkx Monsoon; Katya; Manila Luzon; Miss Fame; Pearl (DJ set); Phi Phi O'Hara; Sharon Needles; Violet Chachki
May 31, 2016	Philadelphia	United States	Electric Factory	Michelle Visage	Adore Delano; Alaska Thunderfuck; BenDeLaCreme; Courtney Act; Ginger Minj; Ivy Winters; Jinkx Monsoon; Katya; Manila Luzon; Miss Fame; Pearl (DJ set); Phi Phi O'Hara; Sharon Needles; Violet Chachki
June 1, 2016	Pittsburgh	United States	Carnegie Library Music Hall	Michelle Visage	Adore Delano; Alaska Thunderfuck; BenDeLaCreme; Courtney Act; Ginger Minj; Ivy Winters; Jinkx Monsoon; Katya; Manila Luzon; Miss Fame; Pearl (DJ set); Phi Phi O'Hara; Sharon Needles; Violet Chachki
June 3, 2016	Cleveland	United States	Agora Theatre	Michelle Visage	Adore Delano; Alaska Thunderfuck; BenDeLaCreme; Courtney Act; Ginger Minj; Ivy Winters; Jinkx Monsoon; Katya; Manila Luzon; Miss Fame; Pearl (DJ set); Phi Phi O'Hara; Sharon Needles; Violet Chachki
June 4, 2016	Royal Oak	United States	Royal Oak Music Theatre	Michelle Visage	Adore Delano; Alaska Thunderfuck; BenDeLaCreme; Courtney Act; Ginger Minj; Ivy Winters; Jinkx Monsoon; Katya; Manila Luzon; Miss Fame; Pearl (DJ set); Phi Phi O'Hara; Sharon Needles; Violet Chachki
June 5, 2016	Indianapolis	United States	Murat Theatre	Michelle Visage	Adore Delano; Alaska Thunderfuck; BenDeLaCreme; Courtney Act; Ginger Minj; Ivy Winters; Jinkx Monsoon; Katya; Manila Luzon; Miss Fame; Pearl (DJ set); Phi Phi O'Hara; Sharon Needles; Violet Chachki
June 7, 2016	St. Louis	United States	The Pageant	Michelle Visage	Adore Delano; Alaska Thunderfuck; BenDeLaCreme; Courtney Act; Ginger Minj; Ivy Winters; Jinkx Monsoon; Katya; Manila Luzon; Miss Fame; Pearl (DJ set); Phi Phi O'Hara; Sharon Needles; Violet Chachki
June 8, 2016	Kansas City, Missouri	United States	Arvest Bank Theatre	Michelle Visage	Adore Delano; Alaska Thunderfuck; BenDeLaCreme; Courtney Act; Ginger Minj; Ivy Winters; Jinkx Monsoon; Katya; Manila Luzon; Miss Fame; Pearl (DJ set); Phi Phi O'Hara; Sharon Needles; Violet Chachki
June 10, 2016	Chicago	United States	Riviera Theatre	Michelle Visage	Adore Delano; Alaska Thunderfuck; BenDeLaCreme; Courtney Act; Ginger Minj; Ivy Winters; Jinkx Monsoon; Katya; Manila Luzon; Miss Fame; Pearl (DJ set); Phi Phi O'Hara; Sharon Needles; Violet Chachki
June 11, 2016	Milwaukee	United States	Pabst Theater	Michelle Visage	Adore Delano; Alaska Thunderfuck; BenDeLaCreme; Courtney Act; Ginger Minj; Ivy Winters; Jinkx Monsoon; Katya; Manila Luzon; Miss Fame; Pearl (DJ set); Phi Phi O'Hara; Sharon Needles; Violet Chachki
June 12, 2016	Minneapolis	United States	Mill City Nights	Michelle Visage	Adore Delano; Alaska Thunderfuck; BenDeLaCreme; Courtney Act; Ginger Minj; Ivy Winters; Jinkx Monsoon; Katya; Manila Luzon; Miss Fame; Pearl (DJ set); Phi Phi O'Hara; Sharon Needles; Violet Chachki
June 14, 2016	Winnipeg	Canada	Burton Cummings Theatre	Michelle Visage	Adore Delano; Alaska Thunderfuck; BenDeLaCreme; Courtney Act; Ginger Minj; Ivy Winters; Jinkx Monsoon; Katya; Manila Luzon; Miss Fame; Pearl (DJ set); Phi Phi O'Hara; Sharon Needles; Violet Chachki
June 16, 2016	Edmonton	Canada	Union Hall	Michelle Visage	Adore Delano; Alaska Thunderfuck; BenDeLaCreme; Courtney Act; Ginger Minj; Ivy Winters; Jinkx Monsoon; Katya; Manila Luzon; Miss Fame; Pearl (DJ set); Phi Phi O'Hara; Sharon Needles; Violet Chachki
June 17, 2016	Calgary	Canada	MacEwan Hall	Michelle Visage	Adore Delano; Alaska Thunderfuck; BenDeLaCreme; Courtney Act; Ginger Minj; Ivy Winters; Jinkx Monsoon; Katya; Manila Luzon; Miss Fame; Pearl (DJ set); Phi Phi O'Hara; Sharon Needles; Violet Chachki
June 19, 2016	Vancouver	Canada	Vogue Theatre	Michelle Visage	Adore Delano; Alaska Thunderfuck; BenDeLaCreme; Courtney Act; Ginger Minj; Ivy Winters; Jinkx Monsoon; Katya; Manila Luzon; Miss Fame; Pearl (DJ set); Phi Phi O'Hara; Sharon Needles; Violet Chachki
June 22, 2016	Dallas	United States	South Side Music Hall	Michelle Visage	Adore Delano; Alaska Thunderfuck; BenDeLaCreme; Courtney Act; Ginger Minj; Ivy Winters; Jinkx Monsoon; Katya; Manila Luzon; Miss Fame; Pearl (DJ set); Phi Phi O'Hara; Sharon Needles; Violet Chachki
June 23, 2016	Austin	United States	Paramount Theatre	Michelle Visage	Adore Delano; Alaska Thunderfuck; BenDeLaCreme; Courtney Act; Ginger Minj; Ivy Winters; Jinkx Monsoon; Katya; Manila Luzon; Miss Fame; Pearl (DJ set); Phi Phi O'Hara; Sharon Needles; Violet Chachki
June 24, 2016	Houston	United States	Warehouse Live	Michelle Visage	Adore Delano; Alaska Thunderfuck; BenDeLaCreme; Courtney Act; Ginger Minj; Ivy Winters; Jinkx Monsoon; Katya; Manila Luzon; Miss Fame; Pearl (DJ set); Phi Phi O'Hara; Sharon Needles; Violet Chachki
June 25, 2016	New Orleans	United States	Joy Theater	Michelle Visage	Adore Delano; Alaska Thunderfuck; BenDeLaCreme; Courtney Act; Ginger Minj; Ivy Winters; Jinkx Monsoon; Katya; Manila Luzon; Miss Fame; Pearl (DJ set); Phi Phi O'Hara; Sharon Needles; Violet Chachki
June 27, 2016	Nashville	United States	Marathon Music Works	Michelle Visage	Adore Delano; Alaska Thunderfuck; BenDeLaCreme; Courtney Act; Ginger Minj; Ivy Winters; Jinkx Monsoon; Katya; Manila Luzon; Miss Fame; Pearl (DJ set); Phi Phi O'Hara; Sharon Needles; Violet Chachki
Oceania 2016
July 1, 2016	Melbourne	Australia	Festival Hall	Michelle Visage	Adore Delano; Alaska Thunderfuck; Detox; Ivy Winters; Jinkx Monsoon; Manila Luzon; Sharon Needles; Violet Chachki
July 2, 2016	Sydney	Australia	The Big Top	Michelle Visage	Adore Delano; Alaska Thunderfuck; Detox; Ivy Winters; Jinkx Monsoon; Manila Luzon; Sharon Needles; Violet Chachki
July 3, 2016	Brisbane	Australia	Eatons Hill Hotel	Michelle Visage	Adore Delano; Alaska Thunderfuck; Detox; Ivy Winters; Jinkx Monsoon; Manila Luzon; Sharon Needles; Violet Chachki
July 5, 2016	Adelaide	Australia	Thebarton Theatre	Michelle Visage	Adore Delano; Alaska Thunderfuck; Detox; Ivy Winters; Jinkx Monsoon; Manila Luzon; Sharon Needles; Violet Chachki
July 6, 2016	Perth	Australia	The Astor Theatre	Michelle Visage	Adore Delano; Alaska Thunderfuck; Detox; Ivy Winters; Jinkx Monsoon; Manila Luzon; Sharon Needles; Violet Chachki
North America 2016
November 25, 2016	Mexico City	Mexico	Auditorio BB	Michelle Visage	Alaska Thunderfuck; Ivy Winters; Manila Luzon; Sharon Needles; Violet Chachki; Katya
