= The Perfect Girl =

The Perfect Girl may refer to:

- The Perfect Girl (2015 film), a Bollywood film
- The Perfect Girl (2017 film), a Taiwanese film
- My Fair Lady (2003 TV series) or The Perfect Girl, a South Korean television series
- "The Perfect Girl" (song), by the Cure, 1987; covered by Mareux, 2021
- "The Perfect Girl", a 2005 story by Israeli writer Guy Hasson

== See also ==
- "Perfect Girl" (song), 2006, by Kim Wilde
- Perfect Girl (film), an upcoming psychological thriller directed by Hong Won-ki
- "Perfect Girls", a song by TLC from TLC
