= The Perfect Girl (song) =

Single by Mareux
- Released: December 8, 2021
- Genre: Dark wave
- Length: 3:14
- Label: Revolution; Warner
- Songwriters: Boris Williams; Lol Tolhurst; Porl Thompson; Robert Smith; Simon Gallup
- Producer: Aryan Ashtiani

Mareux singles chronology
"Dance Floor Dolor" (2020)	"The Perfect Girl" (2021)	"Glass" (2022)

"The Perfect Girl" is a song recorded by the American musician Mareux. It is a cover of the 1987 song by the English rock band the Cure, from their album Kiss Me, Kiss Me, Kiss Me. The song was released as a single on December 8, 2021.

"The Perfect Girl" went viral on TikTok. A few famous users on the app used the song in the summer of 2021, which began the song's spread throughout the community. It is often used in association with fan edits of the film American Psycho. The song debuted and peaked at number 35 on Billboard's Hot Rock & Alternative Songs chart in December 2021 and peaked at number 14 on the UK Independent Singles Breakers Chart in December 2022. The viral success of "The Perfect Girl" allowed Mareux to shoot a music video for the song in 2022 starring Violet Chachki, the winner of the seventh season of RuPaul's Drag Race. as of 2022, videos on TikTok using "The Perfect Girl" have collectively received 2.3 billion plays. It also has over 619 million plays on Spotify as of August 2026.

== Certifications ==
Certifications for "The Perfect Girl"
Region	Certification	Certified units/sales
New Zealand (RMNZ)	Gold	15,000^{‡}
United Kingdom (BPI)	Silver	200,000^{‡}
United States (RIAA)	Platinum	1,000,000^{‡}
^{‡} Sales+streaming figures based on certification alone.
