= Beauty Marked =

Studio album by Miss Fame
- Released: June 9, 2015
- Recorded: 2015
- Genre: Pop; dance; electronic
- Length: 38:22
- Label: Sidecar Records, Producer Entertainment Group
- Producer: Killingsworth Recording Company

Singles from Beauty Marked
- 1. "Rubber Doll" Released: April 28, 2015; 2. "InstaFame" Released: June 9, 2015; 3. "I Run The Runway" Released: February 5, 2016

Beauty Marked is the debut studio album by American drag queen Miss Fame, released on June 9, 2015, by Sidecar Records. Musically, the album is compiled of pop and dance music, with electronic elements, and features appearances from fellow Drag Race contestants, All Stars season two winner Alaska Thunderfuck, and season seven winner Violet Chachki.

== Background ==
On December 7, 2014, during the "Ru-Veal" of the seventh season of RuPaul's Drag Race, Miss Fame was the first queen announced to be a contestant on the show. Miss Fame's angle on the show was a "supermodel" aesthetic. After performing moderately well in the competition, never falling into the bottom two until episode nine, they were eliminated in the ninth episode, "Divine Inspiration", placing him seventh overall.

In promotion of the show, a compilation album, RuPaul Presents: CoverGurlz2 was released, consisting of covers of various RuPaul songs. The tracks were all performed by the contestants of the show, with Dam-Mikkelsen contributing a cover of "Drag Race Theme", a song originally from RuPaul's album Champion, to the album. This was Dam-Mikkelsen's first official appearance on a musical project, although he later contributed vocals for "Tan with You", a parody of RuPaul's song "Dance with U", on an episode of RuPaul's Drag Race.

Dam-Mikkelsen first announced that he was releasing music during an interview with Miss Fame, conducted by vlogging team Feast of Fun, with him announcing it as "some sound for the people to live off of for the next period of time", although he did not specify whether he would be releasing a single or a full album at the time. Regarding the album's title, during the premiere of RuPaul's Drag Race, upon first meeting Miss Fame, he says "I'm ready to show everybody what I'm meant to do, which is leave a beauty mark on the face of the planet". Later, in an interview with The Advocate, Dam-Mikkelsen stated "I've yet to leave my 'Beauty Mark'". He also further commented on his music:

Regarding my music, I was inspired by truth and beauty. The album is an ambient pop creation. I put… in every aspect and vision and feel that it's something completely new and original — deeply humanizing and showcasing truths others may never have known about me. I felt alive creating this album, and completely in tune with my true essence. It also includes purely fun music we can all enjoy to dance to, but I remained true to myself. I am so proud of what I was able to create and realized that we are only as big as we allow yourself to be. I can't wait to share this album.

== Release ==
The album was released June 9, 2015, approximately one week after the finale of Drag Race aired. Beauty Marked was just one of many projects released from Drag Race alumni, with several other past contestants releasing albums within the month of June 2015.

== Singles ==
"Rubber Doll" was officially released as the first single from Beauty Marked, via iTunes, on April 28, 2015. The song was produced by recording company Killingsworth. Following the airing of his elimination on RuPaul's Drag Race, Dam-Mikkelsen released the music video for "Rubber Doll". The video was directed by Ben Simkins, who directed various other videos by Drag Race alumni, including "I Adore U" by Adore Delano. The video for "Rubber Doll" received highly positive reviews from critics, Brandon Voss from Next Magazine commented that Dam-Mikkelsen's "15 minutes are far from dunzo", while OUT said that "Miss Fame mixes the old Hollywood glamour of Marlene Dietrich with the charisma of 1990s supermodel Linda Evangelista — all while dressed in full latex fantasy fetish fashionista pieces".

On June 9, 2015, "InstaFame" was released as the album's second single.

On February 5, 2016, "I Run The Runway (feat. Violet Chachki)" was released as the third single from the album with the premiering video.

== Critical reception ==
In his review, Luis Gonzalez of Album Confessions gave the album four out of five stars, commenting that "the vocal performances throughout the track list may sound alike, there's not much going on to change the delivery up, but the personal songwriting paints a beautiful, glittery picture of fame, glamour and couture. The cohesiveness and charm of the new album was unexpected, and that has to be the most impressive aspect of all."

== Track listing ==
Adapted from Amazon track listing.

No.	Title	Writer(s)	Producer(s)	Length
1.	"Diamond Life"	Kurtis Dam-Mikkelsen	Killingsworth	3:32
2.	"Rubber Doll"	Dam-Mikkelsen	Killingsworth	3:20
3.	"Miss Fame" (featuring Alaska Thunderfuck)	Dam-Mikkelsen; Justin Honard	Killingsworth	3:39
4.	"Life Is Beautiful"	Dam-Mikkelsen	Killingsworth	3:43
5.	"Solid Gold"	Dam-Mikkelsen	Killingsworth	3:21
6.	"Zero Gravity"	Dam-Mikkelsen	Killingsworth	3:21
7.	"All We Are Is Magic"	Dam-Mikkelsen	Killingsworth	3:33
8.	"Give Me Glamour"	Dam-Mikkelsen	Killingsworth	3:27
9.	"Smoke & Mirrors"	Dam-Mikkelsen	Killingsworth	3:42
10.	"I Run the Runway" (featuring Violet Chachki)	Dam-Mikkelsen; Jason Dardo	Killingsworth	3:46
11.	"InstaFame"	Dam-Mikkelsen	Killingsworth	2:58
Total length:				38:22

== Charts ==
Chart (2015)	Peak position
US Heatseekers (Billboard)	25

== Release history ==
Country	Date	Format(s)	Label	Ref.
Worldwide	June 9, 2015	CD; digital download	Sidecar Records	
