= Mareux =

American darkwave musician

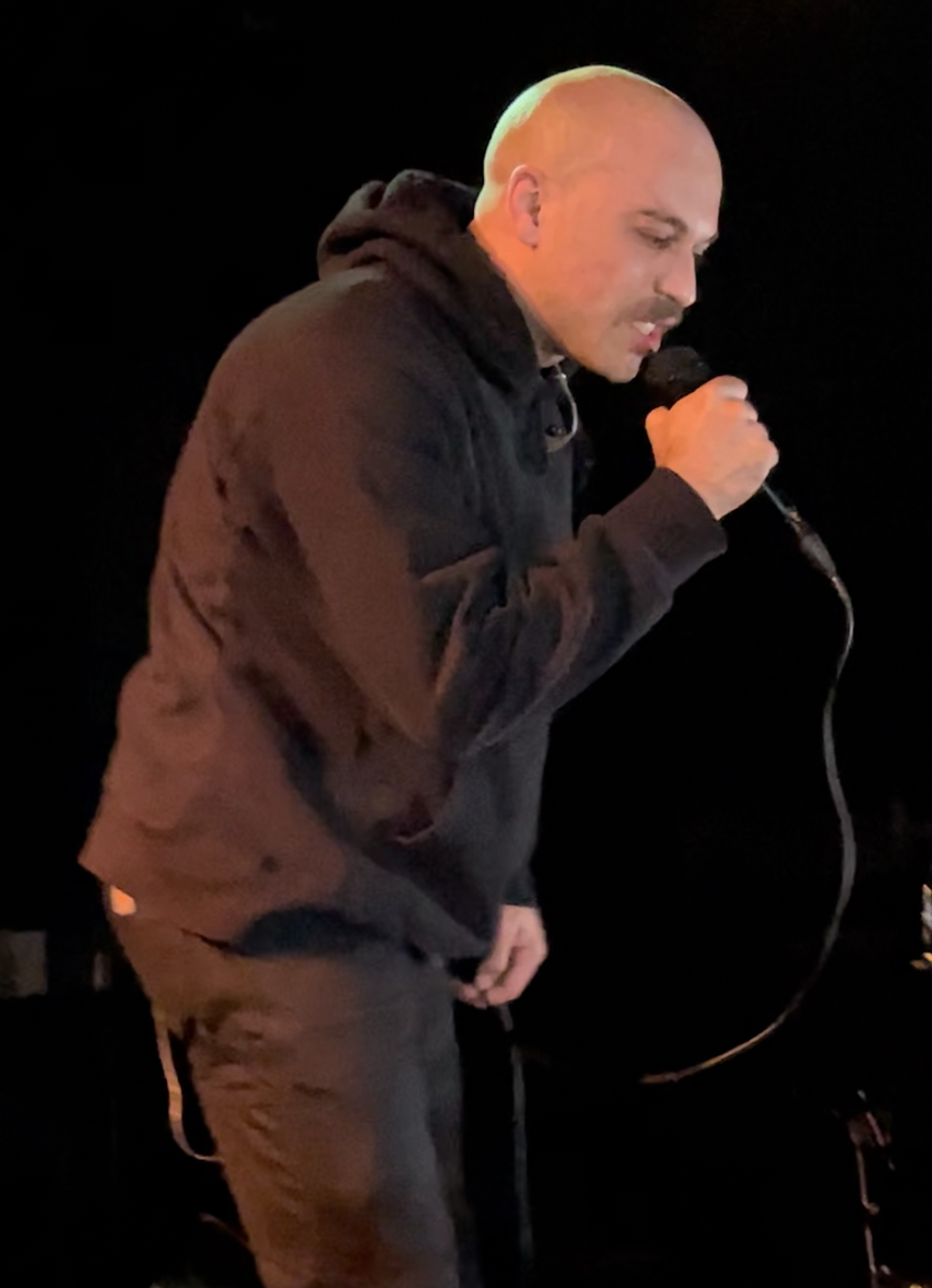
- Mareux performing in 2023

Background information
- Born: Aryan Ashtiani; February 22, 1992 (age 34)
- Origin: Los Angeles, California, U.S.
- Genres: Darkwave; post-punk; gothic rock; electronic
- Years active: 2013–present
- Label: Warner
- Website: mareux.com

Aryan Ashtiani (born February 22, 1992), known professionally as Mareux, is an American musician from Los Angeles, California. He is of Iranian origin. Mareux's work incorporates the genres of darkwave, post-punk, gothic rock and electronic music.

His breakthrough came when his 2015 cover of "The Perfect Girl" by the Cure went viral on TikTok in 2021. He played the Coachella festival in 2023 and released his debut album Lovers From the Past through Warner Records later that year.

== Career ==
Ashtiani's first musical interests were eurodance, which he discovered from watching Polish MTV channels during his summers in Iran, and the post-punk revival bands Interpol and Editors. He started playing guitar at 10 or 11 years old. His interest in music waned until he heard TR/ST's self-titled debut album in 2012, which he said "shook" him, and influenced him to move to his current direction. In 2011 and 2012, Ashtiani made French electro, house music and EDM instead. He adopted the stage name Mareux because it sounded like a fake French name.

Ashtiani released his debut EP as Mareux, Decade, in 2013. He graduated from the University of California, Santa Barbara in 2015 with a bachelor's degree in art. From 2015 to 2018, he gave up on music to pursue a career in healthcare. In 2020, he worked a day job as an EMT and planned to become a physician assistant for Los Angeles' underserved communities. He released the EP Predestiny in 2020.

In 2021, Mareux broke through in popularity when his 2015 cover of The Cure's "The Perfect Girl" went viral on TikTok. A few famous users on the app used the song in the summer of 2021, which began the song's spread throughout the community. It is often used in association with fan edits of the film American Psycho. The song debuted and peaked at number 35 on Billboard's Hot Rock & Alternative Songs chart in December 2021 and peaked at number 14 on the UK Independent Singles Breakers Chart in December 2022. The viral success of "The Perfect Girl" allowed Mareux to shoot a music video for the song in 2022 starring Violet Chachki, the winner of the seventh season of RuPaul's Drag Race. as of 2022, videos on TikTok using "The Perfect Girl" have collectively received 2.3 billion plays. It also has over 250 million plays on Spotify as of May 2023.

His newfound popularity led to Mareux being invited to play Coachella in April 2023. On May 5, 2023, he released his debut album Lovers From the Past through Warner Records, which was preceded by four singles: "Glass" (featuring King Woman), "Night Vision", "Lovers From the Past" and "Little Lies".

== Discography ==
=== Albums ===
- Lovers From the Past (2023)
- Nonstop Romance (2025)

=== Extended plays ===
- Decade (2013)
- Predestiny (2020)
