= Miss Fame =

American model, makeup artist, and drag queen (born 1985)

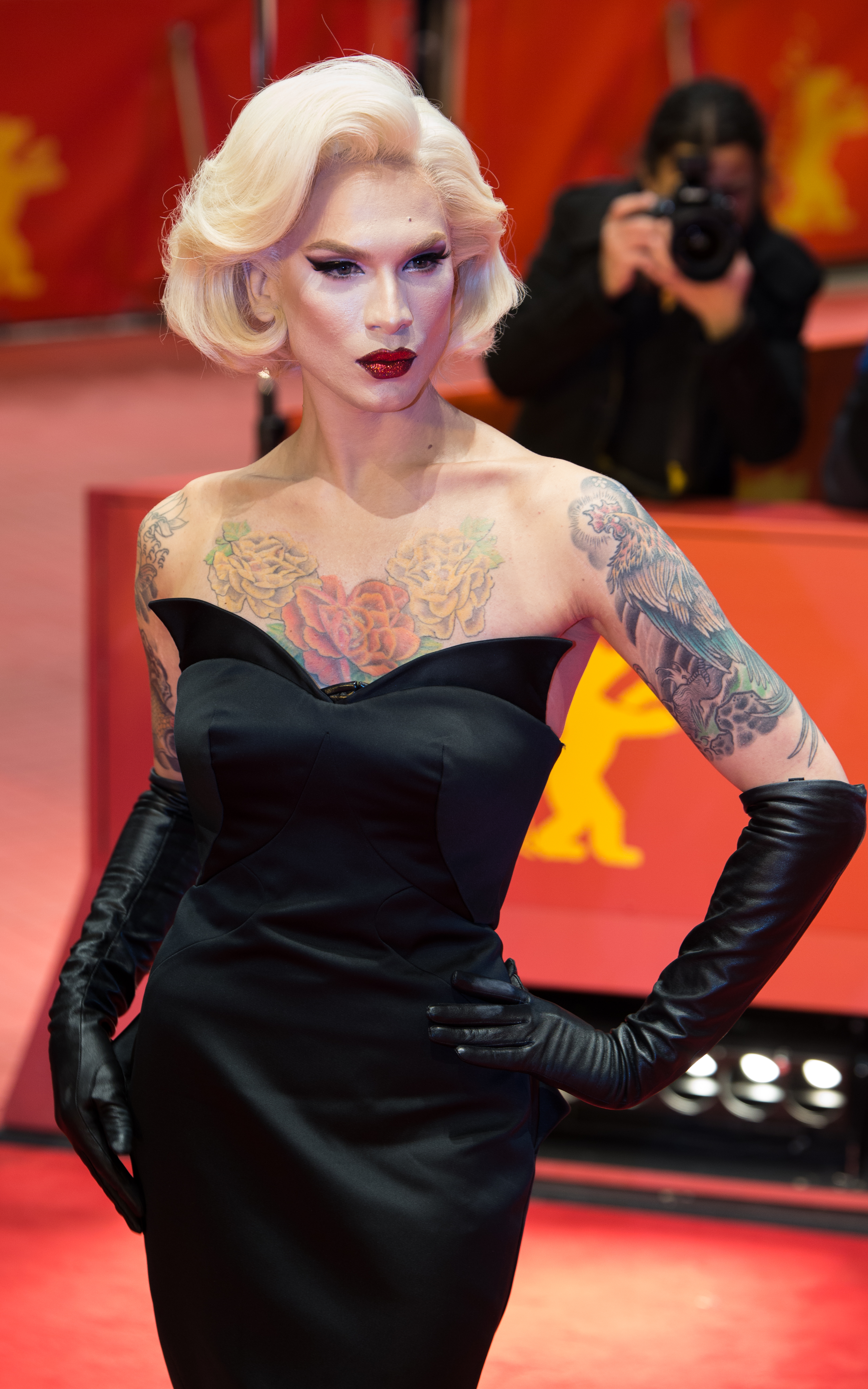
- Fame at the Berlinale 2017
- Born: Kurtis Frank Dam-Mikkelsen; March 30, 1985 (age 41); Templeton, California, U.S.
- Occupations: Model; make-up artist; drag queen; recording artist
- Years active: 2011–present
- Spouse: Patrick Berschy (m. 2013)
- Musical career
- Genres: Pop; dance; electronic
- Label: Sidecar Records

Miss Fame (born March 30, 1985) is the stage name of Kurtis Frank Dam-Mikkelsen, a gender fluid American model, makeup artist, drag queen, recording artist and reality television personality best known as a contestant on season 7 of RuPaul's Drag Race. After appearing on the show, Dam-Mikkelsen as Miss Fame launched a music career, releasing their debut single, "Rubber Doll" on April 28, 2015. Their debut album, Beauty Marked, was released on June 9, 2015. Miss Fame appeared in numerous fashion publications.

== Career ==
Dam-Mikkelsen worked as a male editorial model in California before moving to New York in 2011, following the advice of fashion photographer Mike Ruiz. They then started working as a makeup artist under industry icon Pat McGrath while building a celebrity clientele. At the same time they started modeling and performing in drag as "Miss Fame".

Miss Fame was noticed by photographer Mary McCartney who featured them in her book Devoted. They have also appeared in Half-Drag, a photo series by Leland Bobbé which attracted international attention and were featured in Vogue Italia. Miss Fame was also photographed for Gorgeous, a project by photographers Rob Lebow and Masha Kupets that involved Armen Ra, Candis Cayne, and Tammie Brown. Dam-Mikkelsen works as a celebrity makeup artist in New York City, and have worked on models and celebrities including Marc Jacobs, Ève Salvail, Snooki and JWoww, Martha Wash, Wendy Williams, and Michael Urie.

On December 7, 2014, during the "Ru-Veal" of the seventh season of RuPaul's Drag Race, Miss Fame was the first queen announced to be a contestant on the show. They were eliminated in the ninth episode, "Divine Inspiration," placing them seventh overall. Following their elimination, they released the music video for "Rubber Doll", which was the first single from their debut album, Beauty Marked. The album was released June 9, 2015, and featured appearances from fellow Drag Race contestants Alaska Thunderfuck and Violet Chachki.

In 2016, Miss Fame signed with IMG models Paris.

Miss Fame has been celebrated for their high-fashion editorial work and collaborations with world-renowned photographers like Steven Klein, Giampaolo Sgura, Paola Kudacki, Armin Morbach, Ali Mahdavi, and others. Miss Fame has been featured in publications including Vogue Germany, Vogue Portugal, Vogue Paris, Vogue Japan, CR Fashion Book, PAPER, V Magazine, LOVE, CANDY, Tush, OUT, ELLE, and others.

They contributed to the compilation album Christmas Queens 3 in 2017.

In September 2018, Miss Fame performed as a background dancer behind Christina Aguilera for Opening Ceremony's Spring 2019 collection, with other Drag Race alumni. They released their own makeup line called "The Fetish of Fashion" later in October.

In September 2022, Pinned into a Dress, a documentary about Kurtis' life premiered at the Venice International Film Festival. The short-film highlights Kurtis journey and breakthrough in fashion, despite their trauma and addiction, growing up in a broken family. Opening the Settimana Internazionale della Critica the documentary was co-directed by Gianluca Matarrese and Guillaume Thomas.

== Early and personal life ==
Dam-Mikkelsen was born to Dolly Silveira in San Luis Obispo, California. They have also stated that they were raised by their grandmother, Gloria, as her own child. Kurtis lives with their husband Patrick Bertschy and their pet dachshunds, Mina and Shaya.

In 2020, Kurtis moved to Zürich, Switzerland, with their husband.

== Discography ==
=== Albums ===
Title	Details	Peak chart positions	
Title	Details	US Dance	US Heat
Beauty Marked	Released: June 9, 2015; Label: Sidecar; Formats: Digital download	17	25

=== Singles ===
Title	Year	Album
"Rubber Doll"	2015	Beauty Marked
"InstaFame"	2015	Beauty Marked
"I Run the Runway" (with Violet Chachki)	2016	Beauty Marked

=== Other appearances ===
Title	Year	Other artist(s)	Album
"Drag Race Theme"	2015	RuPaul	RuPaul Presents: CoverGurlz2
"Toyland"	2015	Various Artists	Christmas Queens
"Poo"	2016	Lucian Piane, Pearl, Violet Chachki	RuPaul's Drag Race: The Rusical
"Chicken"	2016	Alaska Thunderfuck	Poundcake
"Christmas Waltz"	2017	N/A	Christmas Queens 3

== Filmography ==
=== Film ===
Year	Title	Role	Ref.
2015	A Change of Heart	Themself	
2022	Pinned into a Dress	Themself	

=== Television ===
Year	Title	Role	Notes	Ref.
2014	Snooki & Jwoww	Themself	Episode: "What a Drag!"	
2015	RuPaul's Drag Race	Themself (Contestant)	Season 7 – Placed 7th	
2021	Germany's Next Topmodel	Themself (Guest Judge)	Season 16 – Episode 11	

=== Web series ===
Year	Title	Role	Notes	Ref.
2014–present	Painted by Fame	Themself	Makeup tutorials	
2015	Untucked	Themself	Companion show to RuPaul's Drag Race	

=== Music videos ===
Title	Year	Director	Ref.
"Drag Race Theme"	2015	Kurtis Dam-Mikkelsen	
"Rubber Doll"	2015	Ben Simkins	
"InstaFame"	2015	Ben Simkins	
"Toyland"	2015	Carlos Maldonado	
"I Run the Runway (feat. Violet Chachki)"	2016	Ali Mahdavi	

=== Music video appearances ===
Title	Year	Director	Ref.
"Save the Queen" (Garek)	2012	Unknown	
"Supermodel (You Better Work)" (2013 Edit) (RuPaul)	2013	Marco Ovando	
"Go All Night" (Gorgon City featuring Jennifer Hudson)	2014	Roboshobo	
"Opulence" (Brooke Candy)	2014	Steven Klein	
"My Animal" (Garek)	2015	Mike Ruiz	

== Awards and nominations ==
Year	Award	Category	Work	Result	Ref.
2022	The WOWIE Awards	Best Beauty Guru Award (The Painted Award)	Themself	Nominated	

== See also ==
- Drag culture in New York City
- LGBTQ culture in New York City
- List of LGBTQ people from New York City
- NYC Drag March
- NYC Pride March
