= Violet Chachki =

American drag queen (born 1992)

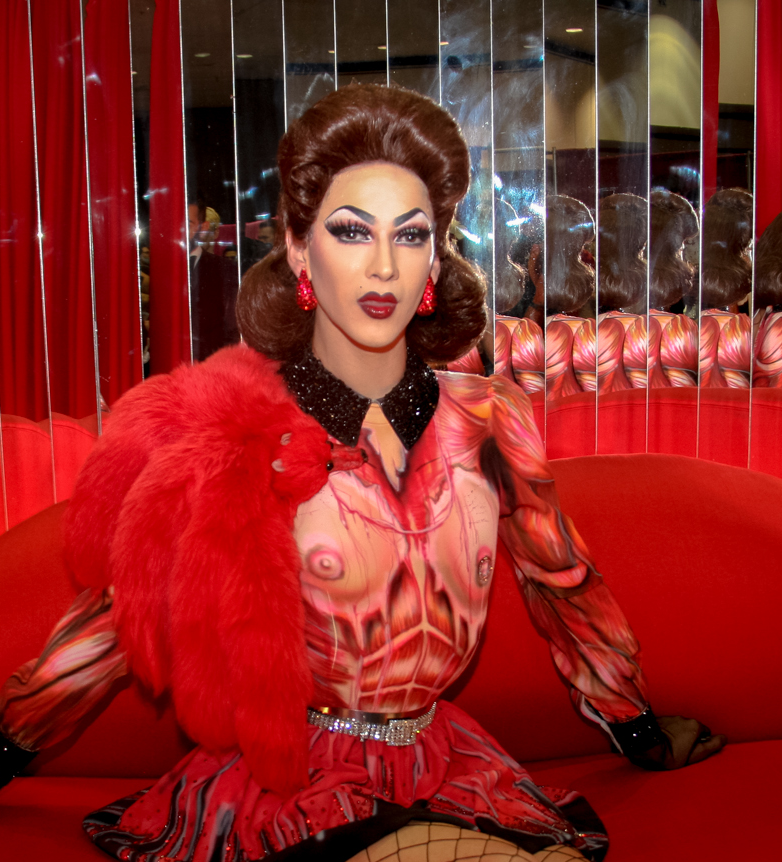
- Chachki in April 2017
- Born: Paul Jason Dardo; June 13, 1992 (age 34); Atlanta, Georgia, U.S.
- Education: St. Pius X Catholic High School; Savannah College of Art and Design
- Occupations: Drag queen Performer; Content creator Model; Recording artist Television personality
- Years active: 2011–present
- Known for: RuPaul's Drag Race (season 7) winner
- Musical career
- Genres: Electronic; Dance-pop; Avant-garde
- Instrument: Vocals
- Labels: Sidecar Records; Producer Entertainment Group

YouTube information
- Channel: Violet Chachki
- Genres: Beauty; Reviews; Vlog; Music
- Subscribers: 290 thousand
- Views: 29 million
- Last updated: May 8th 2026
- Website: violetchachki.com

Paul Jason Dardo (born June 13, 1992), known professionally as Violet Chachki, is an American drag performer, model, entrepreneur and recording artist who rose to prominence after winning the seventh season of RuPaul's Drag Race.

Chachki is known for her high-fashion aesthetic, burlesque performances incorporating aerial dance, and appearances in music videos for artists such as Sam Smith, Mareux, Allie X and Alice Glass.

== Early life ==
Born in Atlanta, Georgia, Dardo has an Ecuadorian parent. She was raised Catholic and attended St. Pius X Catholic High School. During her upbringing, she also lived in Stone Mountain and Lilburn.

== Career ==
Dardo began performing in drag as Violet Chachki at the age of 19. The name "Violet" was inspired by Jennifer Tilly's character of the same name in the film Bound, while "Chachki" is a variant of the Yiddish word tchotchke, used to name a strictly decorative small collectible item or describe a beautiful young lady. She first performed at the bar LeBuzz in Marietta, Georgia. Using a fake ID to perform in local drag shows, she eventually won Miss New Faces at Friends on Ponce in Atlanta and was adopted as a "drag daughter" by drag queens Dax Exclamationpoint (who competed on the eighth season of Drag Race) and Genre Monster. Later, Violet Chachki was enrolled at the Savannah College of Art and Design at the Atlanta campus for fashion design, but dropped out to focus on doing drag. She became a regular cast member of The Other Show at the bar Jungle in Atlanta which gave her exposure locally and allowed her to perform with Alaska Thunderfuck 5000, Amanda Lepore, and Lady Bunny.

In 2013, she was photographed for "Legendary Children". The project focused on Atlanta's drag scene and was exhibited at Gallery 1526. Two photos that featured her genitals and gaff were covered up after complaints. Later, the censorship controversy caught the attention of Vice.

In 2014, she appeared on the cover for the single "Cosplay" by Captain Murphy (AKA Flying Lotus). She also appeared in a commercial for the single on Adult Swim. Flying Lotus recorded the song as Captain Murphy for Adult Swim's Single Series.

In 2015, Violet Chachki was announced as a contestant on seventh season of RuPaul's Drag Race, after having unsuccessfully auditioned for season six. On the show, she was noted for excelling in fashion and design related challenges and her focus on aesthetics and confident demeanor. On June 1, 2015, she won the competition and received a cash prize of $100,000.

Violet Chachki is known for her burlesque performances and aerial work, including aerial silk and aerial hoop. In January 2017, Dardo joined The Art of Teese, a neo-burlesque show headlined by Dita Von Teese.

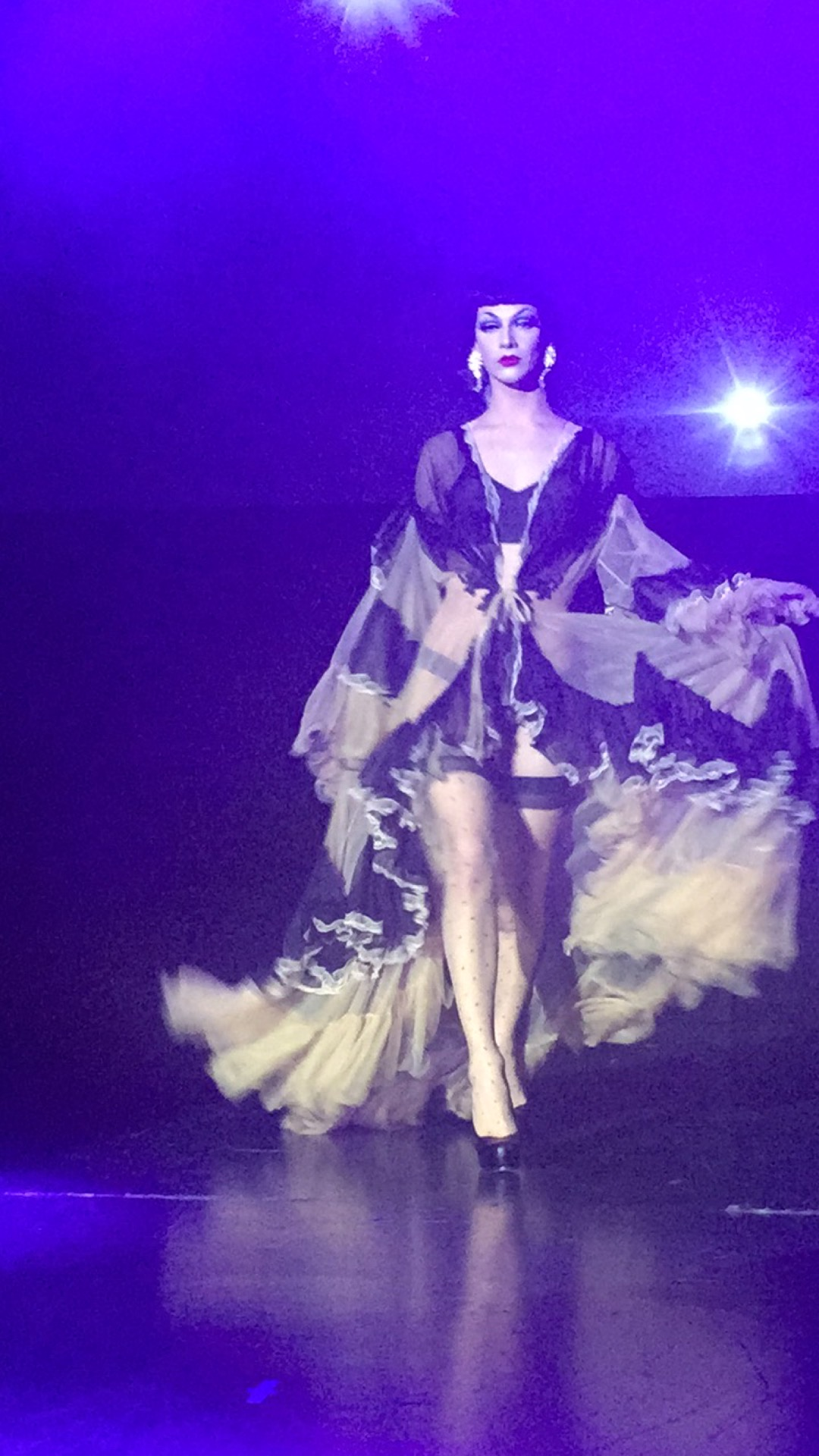
Chachki performing in Copenhagen in 2016

In November 2017, she became the first drag queen in a major lingerie ad campaign, for the brand Bettie Page Lingerie.

In January 2018, she walked for Moschino in their Fall 2018 Collection at Milan Fashion Week.

In April 2019, she became the first international drag queen to have ever performed in India.

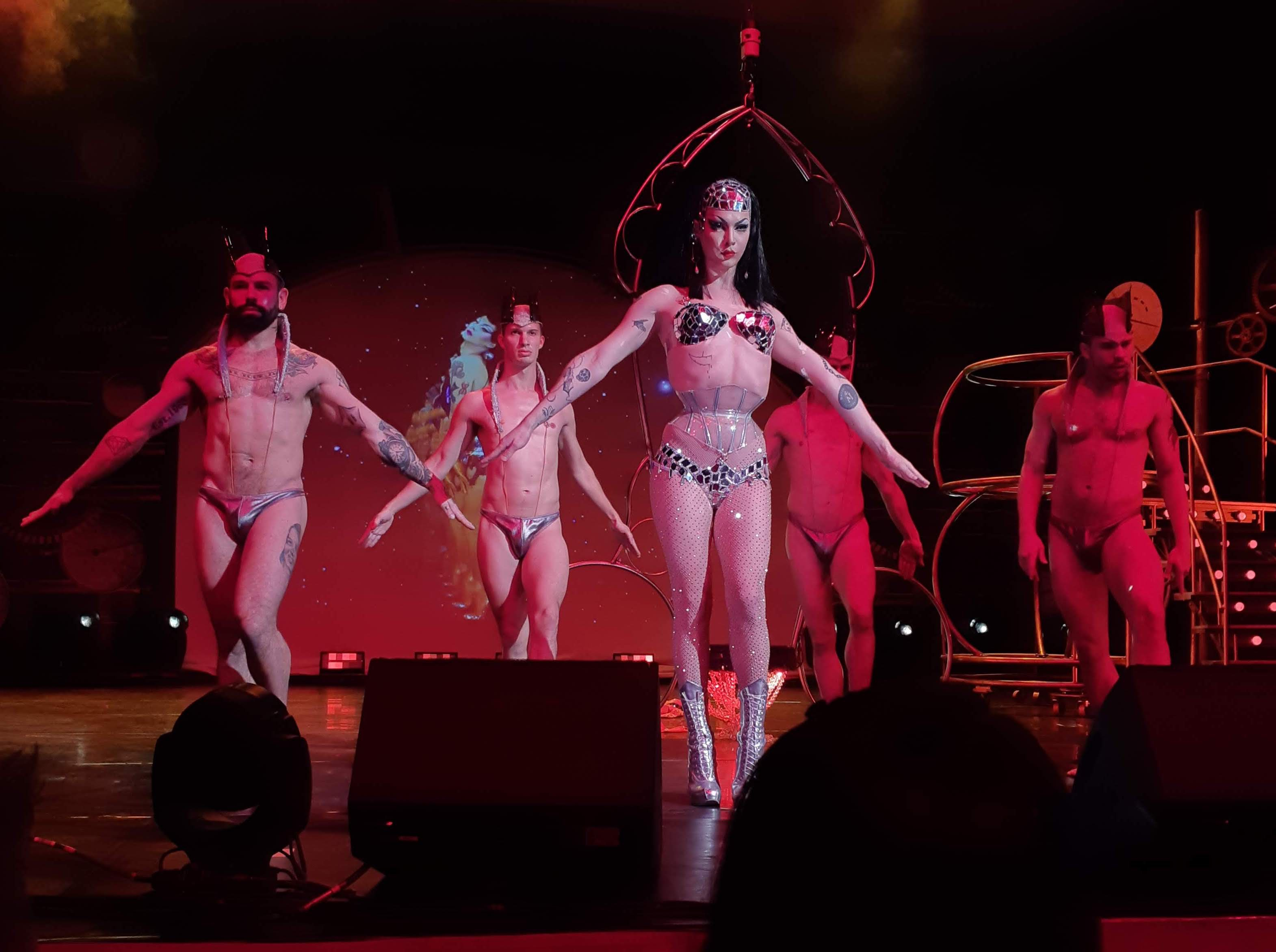
Chachki performing for Werq the World in 2019

In May 2019, she attended the Met Gala, where the theme was Camp: Notes on Fashion, wearing a glove-shaped Moschino dress which was altered by Jeremy Scott. Thus, she became one of the first drag queens at the event, alongside Aquaria and RuPaul. In June 2019, a panel of judges from New York magazine placed Violet Chachki 16th on their list of "the most powerful drag queens in America", a ranking of 100 former Drag Race contestants.

In November 2019, she teamed up with perfume brand Heretic Parfum as collaborator and muse for the genderless fragrance "Dirty Violet".

In 2023, she was featured on an alternate cover for the March 2023 edition of Vogue Czechoslovakia, and became the first Drag Race alum to be featured on the cover of the magazine.

In May 2023, while at a party in Santa Monica, California, Violet Chachki and frequent collaborator, fellow drag queen, and RuPaul's Drag Race alum Gottmik were asked by rapper Cardi B to direct her next music video. The duo accepted, and the completed video is to-be-announced.

In June 2023, she walked in the British Vogue x Luisa Via Roma fashion show in Florence, Italy. The same month, Violet Chachki was awarded the Cultural Icon Award from the Tom of Finland Foundation, which was presented to her by Dita Von Teese.

In 2026, she launched her clothing brand Dardo.

== Music ==
On June 2, 2015, Violet Chachki released "Bettie" as the lead single from her debut EP Gagged. The EP was released on June 30, 2015. In May 2018, she released her fourth single, "A Lot More Me", a burlesque track independent from an album.

In July 2021, Violet Chachki released the single "Mistress Violet" with pop singer Allie X. The song was produced by French producer Lecomte De Brégeot and written by Allie X. The accompanying 1980s influenced music video was shot on analog and features themes of power play and BDSM, with the two appearing in haute couture outfits by Schiaparelli. Violet Chachki had previously appeared in Allie X's 2016 music video for "All the Rage".

== Artistry ==
Violet Chachki's style is characterized by her "obsession with vintage glamour". She has been referred to as "the living embodiment of a 1950s female archetype" and have cited designers Christian Dior, Thierry Mugler and John Galliano as inspirations, as well as "style icons" such as Lady Miss Kier, Dovima, Dita Von Teese, and Raquel Welch.

The influence of fetish fashion and art is a staple in Violet Chachki's aesthetic, with references to the bondage and latex subcultures, John Willie's illustrations, dominatrix imagery and Bettie Page. They told Design Scene in 2016: "I think drag in itself is kind of a fetish, it's kind of uncomfortable and I think bondage and latex are uncomfortable and they have that same feel... I think especially when you're really feeling it and feeling your look and you're willing to suffer through the pain to kind of present yourself the way you want to present... I think that's kind of a fetish. I think it's exhibitionism almost." Violet Chachki is known for her tightly laced corsets.

== Discography ==
=== EPs ===
Title	Details	Peak positions		
Title	Details	US Dance	US Heat	US Indie
Gagged	Released: June 30, 2015; Label: Sidecar Records, Producer Entertainment Group; Formats: Digital download	11	16	48

=== As lead artist ===
Title	Year	Album
"Bettie"	2015	Gagged
"Vanguard"	2015	Gagged
"A Lot More Me"	2018	non-album single
"Whatever Violet Wants" (featuring Daddy Squad)	2021	non-album single
"Mistress Violet" (with Allie X)	2021	non-album single
"TKO" (with Gottmik)	2025	non-album single

=== As featured artist ===
Title	Year	Other artist(s)	Album
"Drop That Pimp"	2015	RuPaul, Miles Davis Moody	RuPaul Presents: CoverGurlz2
"I Run the Runway"	2015	Miss Fame	Beauty Marked
"The Night Before Christmas"	2015	—N/a	Christmas Queens
"Rim"	2019	Brooke Candy, Aquaria	Sexorcism

== Filmography ==
=== Films ===
Title	Year	Role	Notes	Ref.
Queer Moxie	2016	self	Documentary	

=== Television ===
Year	Title	Role	Notes	Ref.
2015	RuPaul's Drag Race (season 7)	self	Contestant (winner)	
2016	RuPaul's Drag Race (season 8)	self	Guest in Episode 1 and 10	
2022	RuPaul's Secret Celebrity Drag Race	self	Guest	

=== Web series ===
Title	Year	Role	Notes	Ref.
Untucked	2015	self	Companion show to RuPaul's Drag Race	
Transformations with James St. James	2016	self	Guest	
The Pit Stop	2017-2022	self	guest in 4 episodes	
Iconic	2018	self	Guest	
Digital Drag	2019	self	Series from their YouTube channel	
Runway Rewind	2019	self	Series from their YouTube channel	
Violet Does	2019	self	Series from their YouTube channel	
His Vintage Touch	2019	self	Guest	
Werq the World	2019	self	World of Wonder's series	
Shop Like a Queen	2019	self	Host	
Huda Boss	2019	self	Season 2, Episode 4	

=== Music videos ===
Title	Year	Artist(s)	Director	Ref.
"Drop That Pimp"	2015	self	—N/a	
"Get Ready to Clock"	2015	themself, Max, Jaidynn Diore Fierce	—N/a	
"Born Naked (Stadium Remix)"	2015	RuPaul	Steven Corfe	
"Bettie"	2015	self	Michael Serrato	
"Vanguard"	2015	self	Michael Serrato	
"I Run the Runway"	2015	Miss Fame	Ali Mahdavi	
"All the Rage"	2016	Allie X	Jungle George/Maluko Haus	
"A Lot More Me"	2018	self	Love Bailey	
"Mine"	2018	Alice Glass	Lucas David	
"I Don't Wanna Brag"	2018	Aja	Assaad Yacoub	
"Whatever Violet Wants"	2021	self	Ali Mahdavi	
"The Perfect Girl"	2022	Mareux	Michael E Linn Nedda Afsari	
"Unholy"	2022	Sam Smith and Kim Petras	Floria Sigismondi	
"L.A. Drags"	2025	Ultra Sunn	Ultra Sunn & Alejandro Lomeli	

=== Other appearances ===
Title	Year	Role	Note	Ref.
#CreateYourStyle	2018	self	Schwarzkopf campaign video	
Neon Dream	2018	Marilyn Monroe Impersonator / Showgirl	Prada campaign video	
Sublime Perfection	2019	self	Path McGrath Labs campaign video	
Oops! I LaLiT Again	2019	self	The LaLiT London ad	
Werq the World Live Stream	2020	self	Voss Events' online show	
Werq the World Battle Royale	2020	self	Voss Events' online show	
Le Male Le Parfum	2020	—N/a	Jean Paul Gaultier campaign video	
Digital Folies	2020	self	Solo live stream show	
Boys Lie Family	2020	—N/a	Boys Lie campaign video	
When You Wear a Condom	2021	self	AHF parody ad	

== Tours ==
=== Headlining ===
- A Lot More Me (World, 2019–present)

=== Co-Headlining ===
- RuPaul's Drag Race: Battle of the Seasons (World, 2015–2016)
- Werq the World (World, 2017–2020)

Awards and achievements
Preceded by Bianca Del Rio	Winner of RuPaul's Drag Race; US season 7	Succeeded by Bob the Drag Queen
