= Ponte Vedra Concert Hall =

Music venue in Ponte Vedra Beach, Florida, U.S.

Coordinates: 30.16752°N 81.36923°W

- Interactive map of Ponte Vedra Concert Hall
- Address: 1050 A1A North, Ponte Vedra Beach, Florida
- Owner: St. Johns County, Florida
- Capacity: 450 seats or 900 SRO
- Type: "intimate venue"
- Event: entertainment

Construction
- Groundbreaking: 2009
- Opened: February 13, 2011 Great Big Sea
- Renovated: 2024–2025
- Cost: $10.7 million
- Architect: Fisher Koppenhafer

Website
- Venue Website

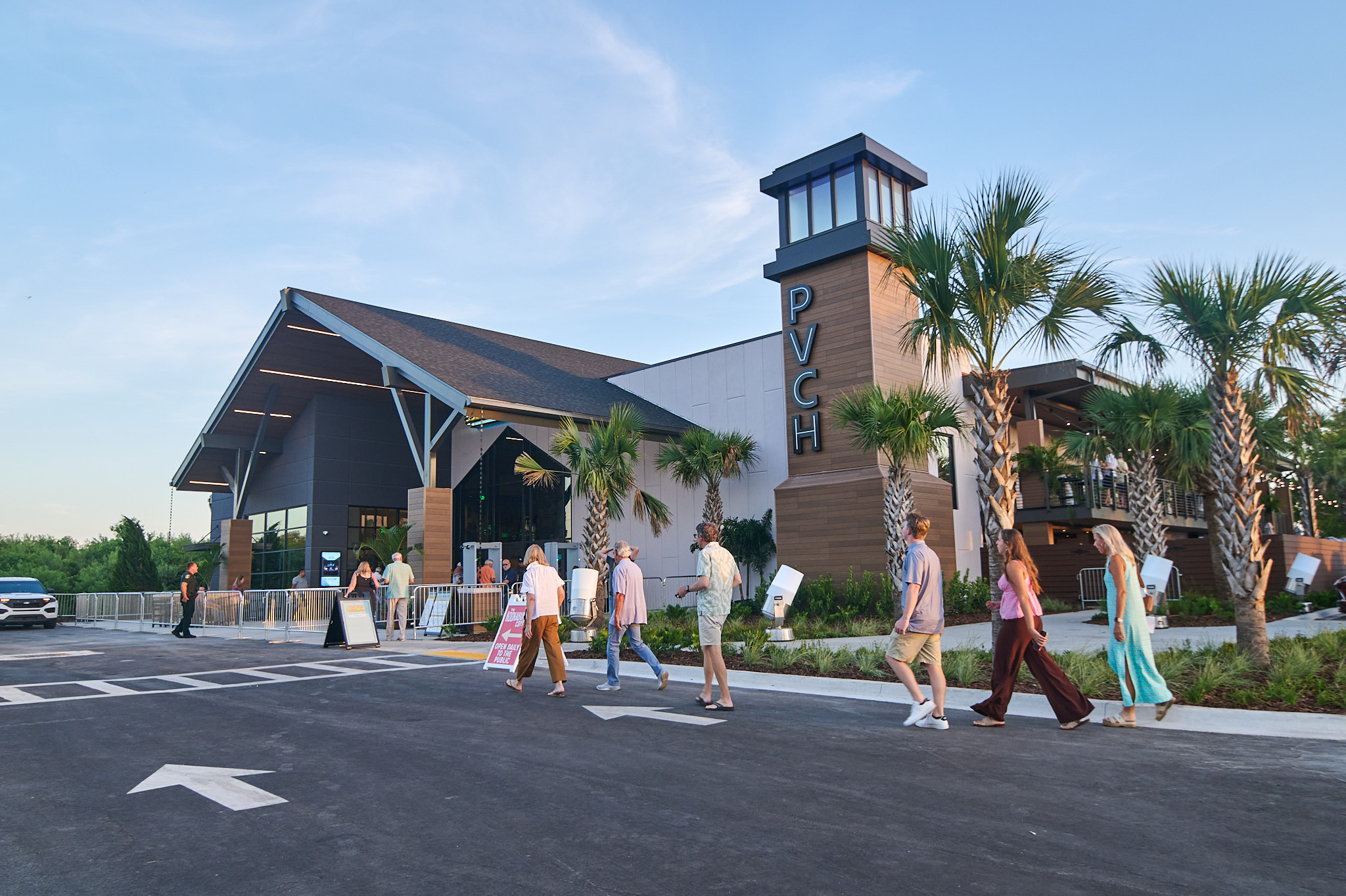

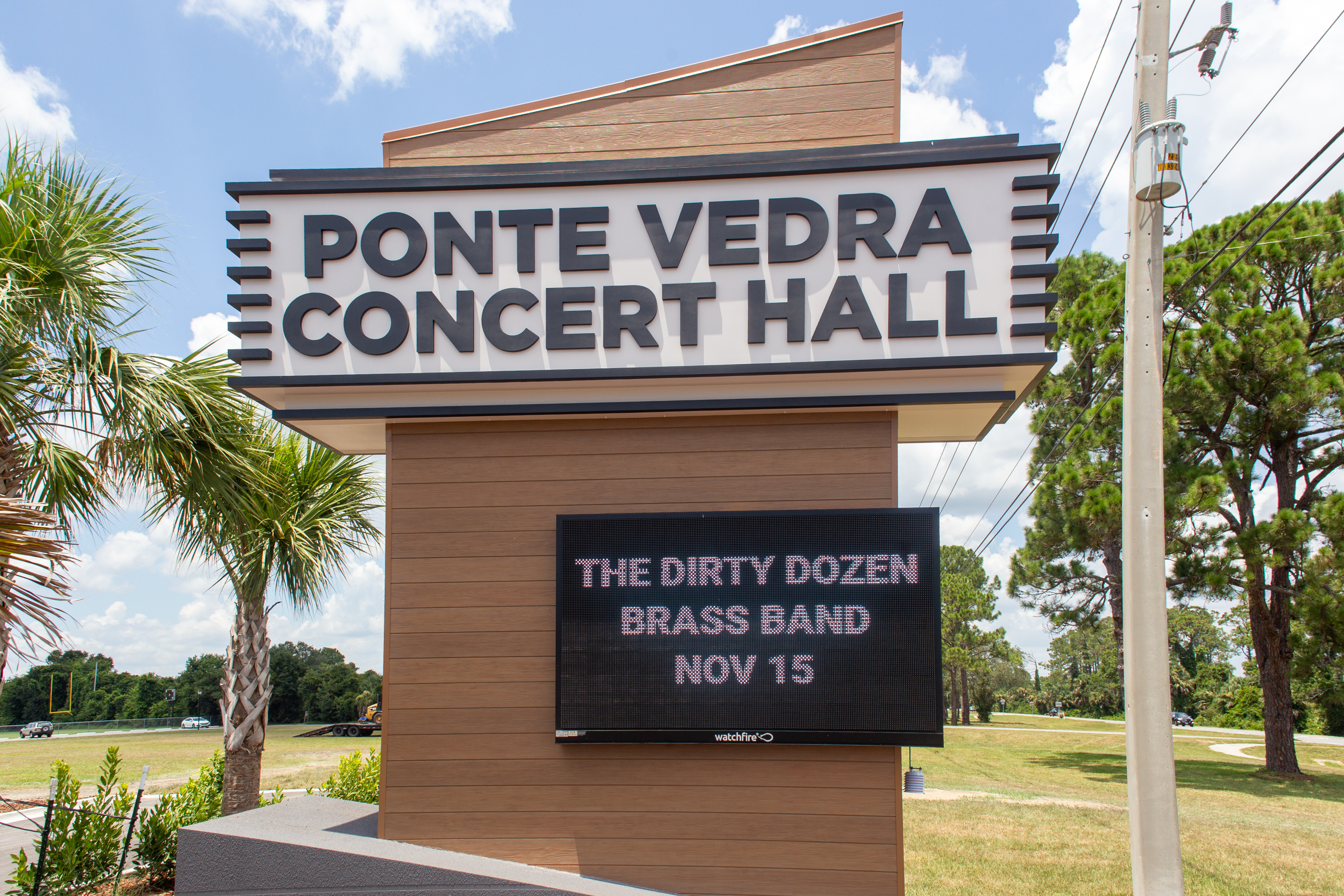

Ponte Vedra Concert Hall (PVCH) is a premier live music venue located in Ponte Vedra Beach, Florida. Now officially reopened following a transformative renovation, the Concert Hall features expanded capacity, upgraded amenities, and state-of-the-art production capabilities. Operated by SJC Cultural Events, Inc., a nonprofit organization, the venue hosts nearly 180 concerts annually and remains a cornerstone of Northeast Florida’s cultural landscape.

== History ==
- The original 17,330 sq ft (1,610 m^{2}) auditorium was built in 1980 for the Palm Valley Baptist Church.
- In 2002 New Beginnings Baptist Church acquired the property but outgrew it and build a new home.
- Four years later, it was purchased by St. Johns County for $9.2 million.
- Renovations began in 2009 to become a music venue.
- The Ponte Vedra Concert Hall opened February 13, 2011 for five concerts that month.
- In 2018 Friends of the Ponte Vedra Concert Hall donate $50,000 to pay for a 925 sq ft (85.9 m^{2}) outdoor terrace.
- A fund-raising campaign was started by Friends of the Ponte Vedra Concert Hall in 2020 to renovate the 40-year-old facility.
- The St. Johns County commission unanimously approved $5.4 million toward for PVCH renovation. The remaining 50% was received or pledged to fully fund the project.
- An April 25, 2024 show with the Dixie Dregs was the last concert before closing the hall for renovation.
- Plans designed by Fisher Koppenhafer were approved, and construction began in 2nd quarter 2024.
- In the 13-year history of the original facility, there were more than 1,100 events featuring 480 different artists attended by almost 400,000 people.

== Renovation ==
The $10.7 million renovation of PVCH is projected to reopen August 1, 2025 with bluegrass musician Dan Tyminski. The venue will feature an L-Acoustics 50kW audio system, superior lighting and projection systems, spacious lobby and restrooms, expanded food & drink options, Stadium seating a 2nd floor balcony with seats and terraces outside 1st & 2nd floors. The hall has hosted artists from across the musical spectrum including pop, jazz, classical, country, rock, bluegrass, folk artists, acoustic singer-songwriters, Grammy-winning acts, community theater productions, comedians and tribute bands. The venue is also available for events such as weddings, receptions, meetings, presentations and celebrations. A St. Johns County Commissioner expects that school groups will be able to utilize the local facility.

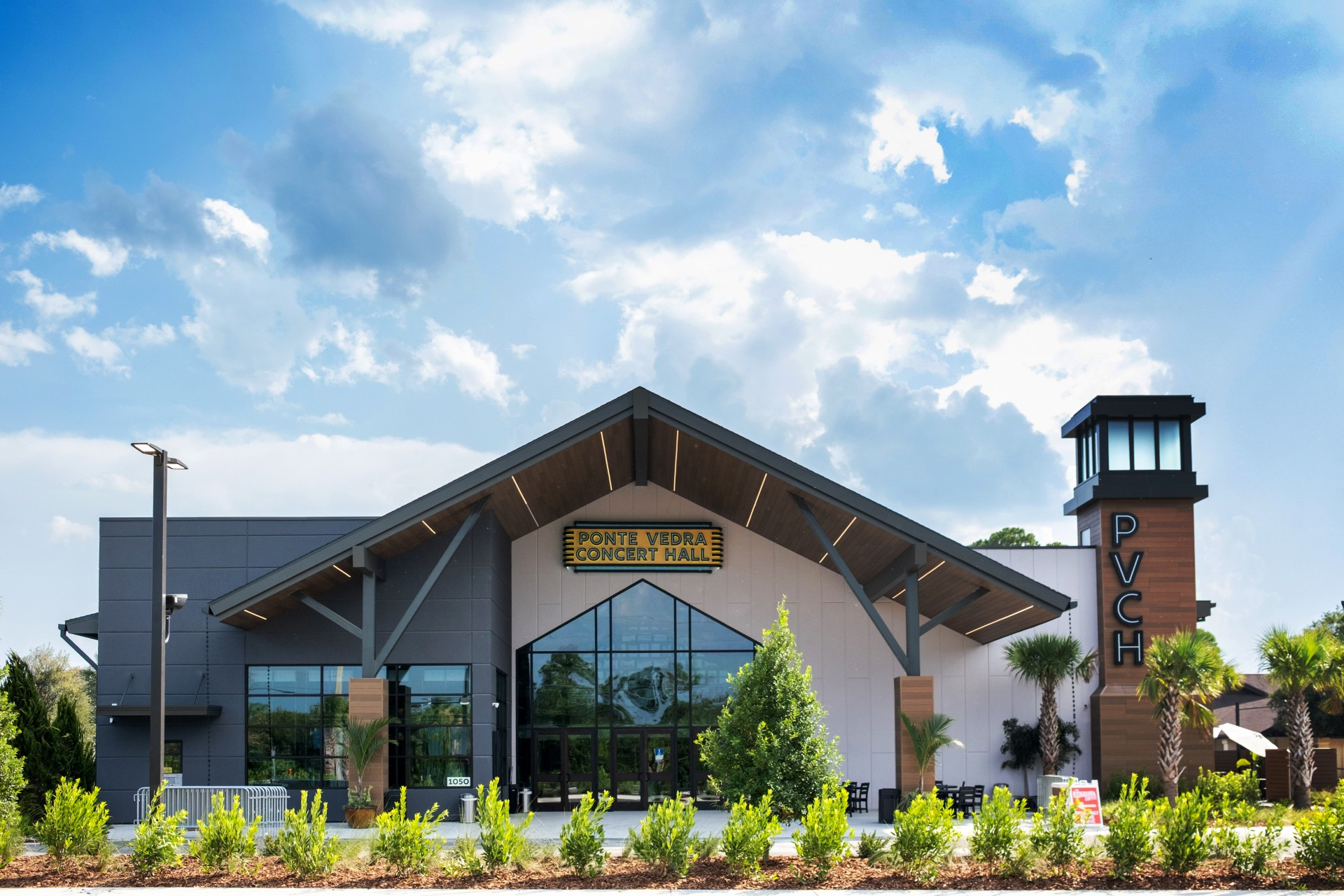

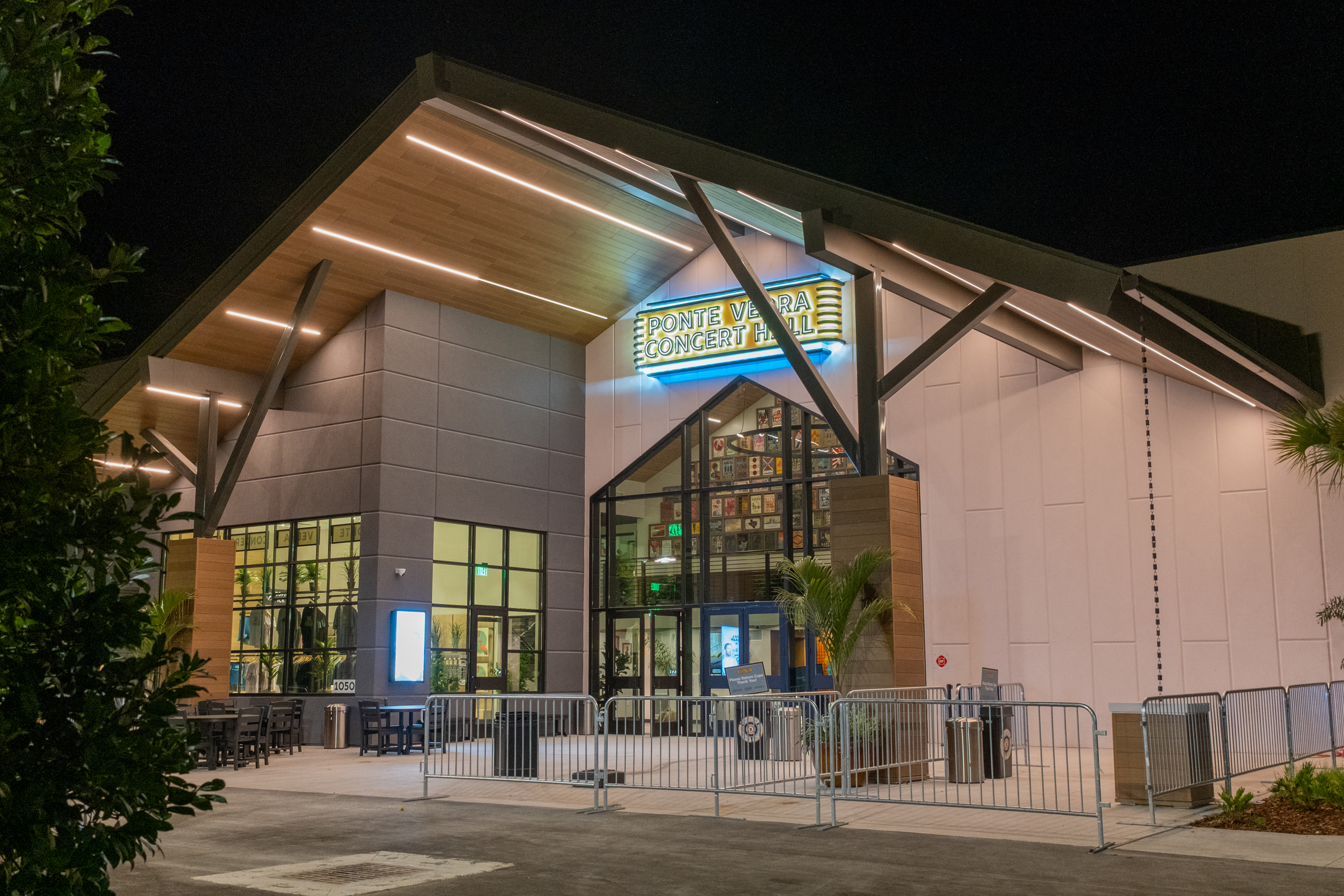
